= List of Padma Shri award recipients (2010–2019) =

Recipients of a civilian award in India

Padma Shri
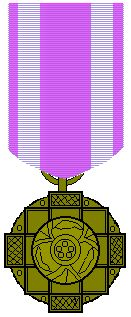
- Type: National Civilian
- Country: India
- Presented by: Government of India
- Ribbon
- Obverse: A centrally located lotus flower is embossed and the text "Padma" written in Devanagari script is placed above and the text "Shri" is placed below the lotus.
- Reverse: A platinum State Emblem of India placed in the centre with the national motto of India, "Satyameva Jayate" (Truth alone triumphs) in Devanagari Script
- Established: 1954
- First award: 1954

Highlights
- Total: 817

Precedence
- Next (higher): Padma Bhushan

Padma Shri Award, India's fourth highest civilian honours for 2010–2019.

== Recipients ==
Award recipients by year
Year	Number of recipients
2010	80
2011	85
2012	76
2013	80
2014	100
2015	74
2016	83
2017	74
2018	72
2019	93

Award recipients by field
Field	Number of recipients
Arts	202
Civil Service	11
Literature & Education	150
Medicine	128
Others	57
Public Affairs	18
Science & Engineering	70
Social Work	85
Sports	61
Trade & Industry	35

Key
# Indicates a posthumous honour

List of Padma Shri award recipients
Year	Recipient	Field	State
2010	Ramakant Achrekar	Sports	Maharashtra
2010	Anu Aga	Social Work	Maharashtra
2010	K. K. Aggarwal	Medicine	Delhi
2010	Philip Augustine	Medicine	Kerala
2010	Gul Bardhan	Arts	Madhya Pradesh
2010	Carmel Berkson	Arts	Maharashtra
2010	Anil Kumar Bhalla	Medicine	Delhi
2010	Ranjit Bhargava	Others	Uttarakhand
2010	Lal Bahadur Singh Chauhan	Literature & Education	Uttar Pradesh
2010	Lalzuia Colney	Literature & Education	Mizoram
2010	Maria Aurora Couto	Literature & Education	Goa
2010	Romuald D'Souza	Literature & Education	Goa
2010	Divyanth Janyavuala	Arts	Hyderabad
2010	Haobam Ongbi Ngangbi Devi	Arts	Manipur
2010	Vijay Prasad Dimri	Science & Engineering	Andhra Pradesh
2010	Bertha Gyndykes Dkhar	Literature & Education	Meghalaya
2010	Surendra Dubey	Literature & Education	Chhattisgarh
2010	Rafael Iruzubieta Fernandez	Public Affairs	– (Note: Indicates a citizen of Spain)
2010	J. R. Gangaramani	Social Work	– (Note: Indicates a citizen of United Arab Emirates)
2010	Nemai Ghosh	Arts	West Bengal
2010	Kodaganur S. Gopinath	Medicine	Karnataka
2010	Sumitra Guha	Arts	Delhi
2010	Laxmi Chand Gupta	Medicine	Delhi
2010	Pucadyil Ittoop John	Science & Engineering	Gujarat
2010	Deep Joshi	Social Work	Delhi
2010	D. R. Karthikeyan	Civil Service	Delhi
2010	Narain Karthikeyan	Sports	Tamil Nadu
2010	Ulhas Kashalkar	Arts	West Bengal
2010	Hamidi Kashmiri	Literature & Education	Jammu & Kashmir
2010	Sudha Kaul	Social Work	West Bengal
2010	Saif Ali Khan	Arts	Maharashtra
2010	Sadiq-ur-Rahman Kidwai	Literature & Education	Delhi
2010	Jalakantapuram Ramaswamy Krishnamoorthy	Medicine	Tamil Nadu
2010	Hermann Kulke	Literature & Education	– (Note: Indicates a citizen of Germany)
2010	Arvind Kumar	Literature & Education	Maharashtra
2010	Mukund Lath	Arts	Rajasthan
2010	Vikas Mahatme	Medicine	Maharashtra
2010	T. N. Manoharan	Trade & Industry	Tamil Nadu
2010	Ayekpam Tomba Meetei	Social Work	Manipur
2010	Kurian John Melamparambil	Social Work	Kerala
2010	Ghulam Mohammed Mir	Others	Jammu & Kashmir
2010	Irshad Mirza	Trade & Industry	Uttar Pradesh
2010	Kapil Mohan	Trade & Industry	Himachal Pradesh
2010	Ramaranjan Mukherji	Literature & Education	West Bengal
2010	Ram Dayal Munda	Arts	Jharkhand
2010	Arundathi Nag	Arts	Karnataka
2010	Saina Nehwal	Sports	Andhra Pradesh
2010	Govind Chandra Pande	Literature & Education	Madhya Pradesh
2010	Raghunath Panigrahi	Arts	Odisha
2010	Sudhir M. Parikh	Social Work	– (Note: Indicates a citizen of the United States)
2010	Rajalakshmi Parthasarathy	Literature & Education	Tamil Nadu
2010	Indira Parthasarathy	Literature & Education	Tamil Nadu
2010	Karsanbhai Patel	Trade & Industry	Gujarat
2010	B. Ravi Pillai	Trade & Industry	– (Note: Indicates a citizen of Bahrain)
2010	Sheldon Pollock	Literature & Education	–
2010	Resul Pookutty	Arts	Kerala
2010	Arjun Prajapati	Arts	Rajasthan
2010	Deepak Puri	Trade & Industry	Delhi
2010	Palpu Pushpangadan	Science & Engineering	Kerala
2010	K. Raghavan	Arts	Kerala
2010	Alluri Venkata Satyanarayana Raju	Trade & Industry	Andhra Pradesh
2010	Shobha Raju	Arts	Andhra Pradesh
2010	B. Ramana Rao	Medicine	Karnataka
2010	M. R. S. Rao	Science & Engineering	Karnataka
2010	Mayadhar Raut	Arts	Delhi
2010	Vijayalakshmi Ravindranath	Science & Engineering	Karnataka
2010	Rekha	Arts	Maharashtra
2010	Arun Sharma	Literature & Education	Assam
2010	Virender Sehwag	Sports	Delhi
2010	Kranti Shah	Social Work	Maharashtra
2010	Baba Sewa Singh	Social Work	Punjab
2010	Rabindra Narain Singh	Medicine	Bihar
2010	Rajkumar Achouba Singh	Arts	Manipur
2010	Vijender Singh	Sports	Haryana
2010	Arvinder Singh Soin	Medicine	Uttar Pradesh
2010	Ponisseril Somasundaran	Science & Engineering	–
2010	Venu Srinivasan	Trade & Industry	Tamil Nadu
2010	Ignace Tirkey	Sports	Odisha
2010	Jitendra Udhampuri	Literature & Education	Jammu & Kashmir
2010	Hari Uppal	Arts	Bihar
2011	Mamraj Agrawal	Social Work	West Bengal
2011	Om Prakash Agrawal	Others	Uttar Pradesh
2011	Mecca Rafeeque Ahmed	Trade & Industry	Tamil Nadu
2011	Madanur Ahmed Ali	Medicine	Tamil Nadu
2011	M. Annamalai	Science & Engineering	Karnataka
2011	Jockin Arputham	Social Work	Maharashtra
2011	Granville Austin	Literature & Education	– (Note: Indicates a citizen of the United Kingdom)
2011	Pukhraj Bafna	Medicine	Chhattisgarh
2011	Upendra Baxi	Public Affairs	–
2011	Mani Lal Bhaumik	Science & Engineering	–
2011	Mahim Bora	Literature & Education	Assam
2011	Urvashi Butalia	Literature & Education	Delhi
2011	Ajoy Chakrabarty	Arts	West Bengal
2011	Pullella Srirama Chandrudu	Literature & Education	Andhra Pradesh
2011	Nomita Chandy	Social Work	Karnataka
2011	Martha Chen	Social Work	–
2011	Neelam Mansingh Chowdhry	Arts	Chandigarh
2011	Mamang Dai	Literature & Education	Arunachal Pradesh
2011	Pravin Darji	Literature & Education	Gujarat
2011	Makar Dhwaja Darogha	Arts	Jharkhand
2011	Chandra Prakash Deval	Literature & Education	Rajasthan
2011	Mahasundari Devi	Arts	Bihar
2011	Kunjarani Devi	Sports	Manipur
2011	Madhukar Keshav Dhavalikar	Others	Maharashtra
2011	Deviprasad Dwivedi	Literature & Education	Uttar Pradesh
2011	Gajam Govardhana	Arts	Andhra Pradesh
2011	Mansoor Hasan	Medicine	Uttar Pradesh
2011	Sunayana Hazarilal	Arts	Maharashtra
2011	Indira Hinduja	Medicine	Maharashtra
2011	S. R. Janakiraman	Arts	Tamil Nadu
2011	Jayaram	Arts	Kerala
2011	Kajol	Arts	Maharashtra
2011	Shaji N. Karun	Arts	Kerala
2011	Girish Kasaravalli	Arts	Karnataka
2011	Irrfan Khan	Arts	Maharashtra
2011	Tabu	Arts	Maharashtra
2011	Sat Pal Khattar	Trade & Industry	– (Note: Indicates a citizen of Singapore)
2011	Balraj Komal	Literature & Education	Delhi
2011	Kalamandalam Kshemavathy	Arts	Kerala
2011	Krishna Kumar	Literature & Education	Delhi
2011	Rajni Kumar	Literature & Education	Delhi
2011	Sushil Kumar	Sports	Delhi
2011	Shanti Teresa Lakra	Others	Andaman and Nicobar Islands
2011	V. V. S. Laxman	Sports	Andhra Pradesh
2011	Devanur Mahadeva	Literature & Education	Karnataka
2011	Shital Mahajan	Sports	Maharashtra
2011	Shyama Prasad Mandal	Medicine	Delhi
2011	Peruvanam Kuttan Marar	Arts	Kerala
2011	Jivya Soma Mashe	Arts	Maharashtra
2011	Barun Mazumder	Literature & Education	West Bengal
2011	Mahesh Haribhai Mehta	Science & Engineering	Gujarat
2011	Ritu Menon	Literature & Education	Delhi
2011	Azad Moopen	Social Work	–
2011	Gulshan Nanda	Others	Delhi
2011	Gagan Narang	Sports	Andhra Pradesh
2011	Avvai Natarajan	Literature & Education	Tamil Nadu
2011	Bhalchandra Nemade	Literature & Education	Himachal Pradesh
2011	Sheela Patel	Social Work	Maharashtra
2011	Jose Chacko Periappuram	Medicine	Kerala
2011	A. Marthanda Pillai	Medicine	Kerala
2011	Krishna Poonia	Sports	Rajasthan
2011	Karl Harrington Potter	Literature & Education	–
2011	Dadi Pudumjee	Arts	Delhi
2011	Riyaz Punjabi	Literature & Education	Jammu & Kashmir
2011	Coimbatore Narayana Rao Raghavendran	Science & Engineering	Tamil Nadu
2011	Kailasam Raghavendra Rao	Trade & Industry	Tamil Nadu
2011	Koneru Ramakrishna Rao	Literature & Education	Andhra Pradesh
2011	Anita Reddy	Social Work	Karnataka
2011	Suman Sahai	Science & Engineering	Delhi
2011	Buangi Sailo	Literature & Education	Mizoram
2011	M. K. Saroja	Arts	Tamil Nadu
2011	Prashant Kumar Sen	Civil Service	Bihar
2011	Anant Darshan Shankar	Public Affairs	Karnataka
2011	G. Shankar	Science & Engineering	Kerala
2011	Devi Dutt Sharma	Literature & Education	Uttarakhand
2011	Nilamber Dev Sharma	Literature & Education	Jammu & Kashmir
2011	E. A. Siddiq	Science & Engineering	Andhra Pradesh
2011	Harbhajan Singh	Sports	Punjab
2011	Khangembam Mangi Singh	Arts	Manipur
2011	Subra Suresh	Science & Engineering	–
2011	Kanubhai Hasmukhbhai Tailor	Social Work	Gujarat
2011	Prahlad Tipanya	Arts	Madhya Pradesh
2011	Usha Uthup	Arts	West Bengal
2011	Sivapatham Vittal	Medicine	Tamil Nadu
2011	Narayan Singh Bhati Zipashni	Civil Service	Andhra Pradesh
2012	V. Adimurthy	Science & Engineering	Kerala
2012	Satish Alekar	Arts	Maharashtra
2012	Nitya Anand	Medicine	Uttar Pradesh
2012	Syed Mohammed Arif	Sports	Andhra Pradesh
2012	Ajeet Bajaj	Sports	Haryana
2012	Rameshwar Nath Koul Bamezai	Science & Engineering	Jammu & Kashmir
2012	Mukesh Batra	Medicine	Maharashtra
2012	Shamshad Begum	Social Work	Chhattisgarh
2012	Vanraj Bhatia	Arts	Maharashtra
2012	Krishna Lal Chadha	Science & Engineering	Delhi
2012	Ravi Chaturvedi	Sports	Delhi
2012	Virander Singh Chauhan	Science & Engineering	Delhi
2012	Nameirakpam Ibemni Devi	Arts	Manipur
2012	Reeta Devi	Social Work	Delhi
2012	Geeta Dharmarajan	Literature & Education	Delhi
2012	Gopal Prasad Dubey	Arts	Jharkhand
2012	Arun Hastimal Firodia	Trade & Industry	Maharashtra
2012	Eberhard Fischer	Literature & Education	– (Note: Indicates a citizen of Switzerland)
2012	P. K. Gopal	Social Work	Tamil Nadu
2012	Jhulan Goswami	Sports	West Bengal
2012	Swapan Guha	Others	Rajasthan
2012	Ramakant Gundecha	Arts	Madhya Pradesh
2012	Umakant Gundecha	Arts	Madhya Pradesh
2012	Kedar Gurung	Literature & Education	Sikkim
2012	Mahdi Hasan	Medicine	Uttar Pradesh
2012	Chittani Ramachandra Hegde	Arts	Karnataka
2012	Zafar Iqbal	Sports	Uttar Pradesh
2012	Anup Jalota	Arts	Maharashtra
2012	Devendra Jhajharia	Sports	Rajasthan
2012	K. Ullas Karanth	Others	Karnataka
2012	Moti Lal Kemmu	Arts	Jammu & Kashmir
2012	Shahid Parvez Khan	Arts	Maharashtra
2012	Jugal Kishore (Note: Jugal Kishore died on 23 January 2012, at the age of 98.)#	Medicine	Delhi
2012	Mohanlal Chaturbhuj Kumhar	Arts	Rajasthan
2012	Yezdi Hirji Malegam	Public Affairs	Maharashtra
2012	Sakar Khan Manganiar	Arts	Rajasthan
2012	Joy Michael	Arts	Delhi
2012	Minati Mishra	Arts	Odisha
2012	V. Mohan	Medicine	Tamil Nadu
2012	G. Muniratnam	Social Work	Andhra Pradesh
2012	Na. Muthuswamy	Arts	Tamil Nadu
2012	R. Nagarathnamma	Arts	Karnataka
2012	J. Hareendran Nair	Medicine	Kerala
2012	Kalamandalam Sivan Namboodiri	Arts	Kerala
2012	Vallalarpuram Sennimalai Natarajan	Medicine	Tamil Nadu
2012	K. Paddayya	Others	Maharashtra
2012	Niranjan Pranshankar Pandya	Social Work	Maharashtra
2012	Pravin H. Parekh	Public Affairs	Delhi
2012	Surjit Singh Patar	Literature & Education	Punjab
2012	Priya Paul	Trade & Industry	Delhi
2012	Gopinath Pillai	Trade & Industry	–
2012	Swati A. Piramal	Trade & Industry	Maharashtra
2012	Priyadarshan	Arts	Tamil Nadu
2012	Yagnaswami Sundara Rajan	Science & Engineering	Karnataka
2012	Limba Ram	Sports	Rajasthan
2012	T. Venkatapathi Reddiar	Others	Puducherry
2012	Sachchidanand Sahai	Literature & Education	Haryana
2012	Kartikeya V. Sarabhai	Others	Gujarat
2012	Irwin Allan Sealy	Literature & Education	Uttarakhand
2012	Pepita Seth	Literature & Education	Kerala
2012	Vijay Sharma	Arts	Himachal Pradesh
2012	Shoji Shiba	Trade & Industry	– (Note: Indicates a citizen of Japan)
2012	Vijay Dutt Shridhar	Literature & Education	Madhya Pradesh
2012	Jagadish Shukla	Science & Engineering	–
2012	Jitendra Kumar Singh	Medicine	Bihar
2012	Vijaypal Singh	Science & Engineering	Uttar Pradesh
2012	Lokesh Kumar Singhal	Science & Engineering	Haryana
2012	Ralte L. Thanmawia	Literature & Education	Mizoram
2012	Uma Tuli	Social Work	Delhi
2012	Laila Tyabji	Arts	Delhi
2012	Prabhakar Vaidya	Sports	Maharashtra
2012	Shrinivas S. Vaishya	Medicine	Daman & Diu
2012	S. P. Varma	Social Work	Jammu & Kashmir
2012	Yamunabai Waikar	Arts	Maharashtra
2012	Phoolbasan Bai Yadav	Social Work	Chhattisgarh
2012	Binny Yanga	Social Work	Arunachal Pradesh
2013	Anvita Abbi	Literature & Education	Delhi
2013	Premlata Agarwal	Sports	Jharkhand
2013	Sudarshan K. Aggarwal	Medicine	Delhi
2013	Manindra Agrawal	Science & Engineering	Uttar Pradesh
2013	S. Shakir Ali	Arts	Rajasthan
2013	Gajam Anjaiah	Arts	Andhra Pradesh
2013	Rajendra Achyut Badwe	Medicine	Maharashtra
2013	Bapu	Arts	Tamil Nadu
2013	Mustansir Barma	Science & Engineering	Maharashtra
2013	Hemendra Prasad Barooah	Trade & Industry	West Bengal
2013	Pablo Bartholomew	Arts	Delhi
2013	Purna Das Baul	Arts	West Bengal
2013	G. C. D. Bharti	Arts	Chhattisgarh
2013	Apurba Kishore Bir	Arts	Maharashtra
2013	Ravindra Singh Bisht	Others	Uttar Pradesh
2013	Ghanakanta Bora	Arts	Assam
2013	Avinash Chander	Science & Engineering	Delhi
2013	Jharna Dhara Chowdhury	Social Work	– (Note: Indicates a citizen of Bangladesh)
2013	Krishna Chandra Chunekar	Medicine	Uttar Pradesh
2013	Taraprasad Das	Medicine	Odisha
2013	T. V. Devarajan	Medicine	Tamil Nadu
2013	Sanjay Govind Dhande	Science & Engineering	Maharashtra
2013	Yogeshwar Dutt	Sports	Haryana
2013	Nida Fazli	Literature & Education	Maharashtra
2013	Saroj Chooramani Gopal	Medicine	Uttar Pradesh
2013	Jayaraman Gowrishankar	Science & Engineering	Andhra Pradesh
2013	Vishwa Kumar Gupta	Medicine	Delhi
2013	Radhika Herzberger	Literature & Education	Andhra Pradesh
2013	B. Jayashree	Arts	Karnataka
2013	Pramod Kumar Julka	Medicine	Delhi
2013	Sharad P. Kale	Science & Engineering	Maharashtra
2013	Milind Kamble	Trade & Industry	Maharashtra
2013	Noboru Karashima	Literature & Education	–
2013	Gulshan Rai Khatri	Medicine	Delhi
2013	Ram Krishan#	Social Work	Uttar Pradesh
2013	Ritu Kumar	Others	Delhi
2013	Vijay Kumar	Sports	Madhya Pradesh
2013	Hildamit Lepcha	Arts	Sikkim
2013	Salik Lucknawi (Note: Salik Lucknawi died on 4 January 2013, at the age of 100.)#	Literature & Education	West Bengal
2013	Vandana Luthra	Trade & Industry	Delhi
2013	Madhu	Arts	Kerala
2013	S. K. M. Maeilanandhan	Social Work	Tamil Nadu
2013	Sudha Malhotra	Arts	Maharashtra
2013	J. Malsawma	Literature & Education	Mizoram
2013	Ganesh Kumar Mani	Medicine	Delhi
2013	Amit Prabhakar Maydeo	Medicine	Maharashtra
2013	Kailash Chandra Meher	Arts	Odisha
2013	Nileema Mishra	Social Work	Maharashtra
2013	Girisha Nagarajegowda	Sports	Karnataka
2013	Reema Nanavati	Social Work	Gujarat
2013	Sundaram Natarajan	Medicine	Maharashtra
2013	Sankar Kumar Pal	Science & Engineering	West Bengal
2013	Brahmdeo Ram Pandit	Arts	Maharashtra
2013	Nana Patekar	Arts	Maharashtra
2013	Devendra Patel	Literature & Education	Gujarat
2013	Rajshree Pathy	Trade & Industry	Tamil Nadu
2013	Deepak B. Phatak	Science & Engineering	Maharashtra
2013	Christopher Pinney	Literature & Education	–
2013	Mudundi Ramakrishna Raju	Science & Engineering	Andhra Pradesh
2013	C. Venkata S. Ram	Medicine	Andhra Pradesh
2013	Manju Bharat Ram (Note: Manju Bharat Ram died on 12 December 2012, at the age of 66.)#	Social Work	Delhi
2013	Rekandar Nageswara Rao	Arts	Andhra Pradesh
2013	Kalpana Saroj	Trade & Industry	Maharashtra
2013	Ghulam Mohammad Saznawaz	Arts	Jammu & Kashmir
2013	Mohammad Sharaf-e-Alam	Literature & Education	Bihar
2013	Surendra Sharma	Literature & Education	Delhi
2013	Jaymala Shiledar	Arts	Maharashtra
2013	Rama Kant Shukla	Literature & Education	Delhi
2013	Dingko Singh	Sports	Manipur
2013	Jagdish Prasad Singh	Literature & Education	Bihar
2013	Ramesh Sippy	Arts	Maharashtra
2013	Ajay K. Sood	Science & Engineering	Karnataka
2013	Sridevi	Arts	Maharashtra
2013	Bajrang Lal Takhar	Sports	Rajasthan
2013	Suresh Talwalkar	Arts	Maharashtra
2013	Mahrukh Tarapor	Arts	Maharashtra
2013	Balwant Thakur	Arts	Jammu & Kashmir
2013	Rajendra Tikku	Arts	Jammu & Kashmir
2013	K. VijayRaghavan	Science & Engineering	Delhi
2013	Akhtarul Wasey	Literature & Education	Delhi
2014	Naheed Abidi	Literature & Education	Uttar Pradesh
2014	Kiritkumar Mansukhlal Acharya	Medicine	Gujarat
2014	Subrat Kumar Acharya	Medicine	Delhi
2014	Mohammad Ali Baig	Arts	Andhra Pradesh
2014	Vidya Balan	Arts	Maharashtra
2014	Sekhar Basu	Science & Engineering	Maharashtra
2014	Musafir Ram Bhardwaj	Arts	Himachal Pradesh
2014	Balram Bhargava	Medicine	Uttar Pradesh
2014	Ashok Chakradhar	Literature & Education	Delhi
2014	Indira Chakravarty	Medicine	West Bengal
2014	Madhavan Chandradathan	Science & Engineering	Kerala
2014	Sabitri Chatterjee	Arts	West Bengal
2014	Chhakchhuak Chhuanvawram	Literature & Education	Mizoram
2014	Anjum Chopra	Sports	Delhi
2014	Sunil Dabas	Sports	Haryana
2014	Narendra Dabholkar (Note: Narendra Dabholkar died on 20 August 2013, at the age of 67.)#	Social Work	Maharashtra
2014	Keki N. Daruwalla	Literature & Education	Delhi
2014	Biman Bihari Das	Arts	Delhi
2014	Sunil Das	Arts	West Bengal
2014	Ramakant Krishnaji Deshpande	Medicine	Maharashtra
2014	Elam Endira Devi	Arts	Manipur
2014	Supriya Devi	Arts	West Bengal
2014	G. N. Devy	Literature & Education	Gujarat
2014	Love Raj Singh Dharmshaktu	Sports	Delhi
2014	Brahm Dutt	Social Work	Haryana
2014	Kolakaluri Enoch	Literature & Education	Andhra Pradesh
2014	Ved Kumari Ghai	Literature & Education	Jammu & Kashmir
2014	Vijay Ghate	Arts	Maharashtra
2014	Jayanta Kumar Ghosh	Science & Engineering	West Bengal
2014	Mukul Chandra Goswami	Social Work	Assam
2014	Pawan Raj Goyal	Medicine	Haryana
2014	Rajesh Kumar Grover	Medicine	Delhi
2014	Ravi Grover	Science & Engineering	Maharashtra
2014	Amod Gupta	Medicine	Haryana
2014	Daya Kishore Hazra	Medicine	Uttar Pradesh
2014	Ramakrishna V. Hosur	Science & Engineering	Maharashtra
2014	Ramaswamy R Iyer	Science & Engineering	Delhi
2014	Thenumgal Poulose Jacob	Medicine	Tamil Nadu
2014	Manorama Jafa	Literature & Education	Delhi
2014	Durga Jain	Social Work	Maharashtra
2014	Eluvathingal Devassy Jemmis	Science & Engineering	Karnataka
2014	Nayana Apte Joshi	Arts	Maharashtra
2014	Shashank R. Joshi	Medicine	Maharashtra
2014	Rani Karnaa	Arts	West Bengal
2014	Bansi Kaul	Arts	Delhi
2014	J. L. Kaul	Social Work	Delhi
2014	Hakim Syed Khaleefathullah	Medicine	Tamil Nadu
2014	Moinuddin Khan	Arts	Rajasthan
2014	Rehana Khatoon	Literature & Education	Delhi
2014	P. Kilemsungla	Literature & Education	Delhi
2014	Milind Vasant Kirtane	Medicine	Maharashtra
2014	A. S. Kiran Kumar	Science & Engineering	Gujarat
2014	Lalit Kumar	Medicine	Delhi
2014	Ashok Kumar Mago	Public Affairs	–
2014	Geeta Mahalik	Arts	Delhi
2014	Paresh Maity	Arts	Delhi
2014	Sengaku Mayeda	Literature & Education	–
2014	Waikhom Gojen Meitei	Literature & Education	Manipur
2014	Mohan Mishra	Medicine	Bihar
2014	Ram Mohan	Arts	Maharashtra
2014	Vamsi Mootha	Medicine	–
2014	Siddhartha Mukherjee	Medicine	–
2014	Nitish Naik	Medicine	Delhi
2014	M. Subhadra Nair	Medicine	Kerala
2014	Vishnunarayanan Namboothiri	Literature & Education	Kerala
2014	Ravi Kumar Narra	Trade & Industry	Andhra Pradesh
2014	Dipika Pallikal	Sports	Tamil Nadu
2014	Ashok Panagariya	Medicine	Rajasthan
2014	Narendra Kumar Pandey	Medicine	Haryana
2014	Ajay Kumar Parida	Science & Engineering	Tamil Nadu
2014	Sudarsan Pattnaik	Arts	Odisha
2014	Pratap Govindrao Pawar	Trade & Industry	Maharashtra
2014	H. Boniface Prabhu	Sports	Karnataka
2014	Sunil Pradhan	Medicine	Uttar Pradesh
2014	M. Y. S. Prasad	Science & Engineering	Andhra Pradesh
2014	Ashok Rajgopal	Medicine	Delhi
2014	Kamini A. Rao	Medicine	Karnataka
2014	Paresh Rawal	Arts	Maharashtra
2014	Wendell Rodricks	Others	Goa
2014	Sarbeswar Sahariah	Medicine	Andhra Pradesh
2014	Rajesh Saraiya	Trade & Industry	Maharashtra
2014	Kalamandalam Satyabhama	Arts	Kerala
2014	Mathur Savani	Social Work	Gujarat
2014	Hasmukh Chamanlal Shah	Public Affairs	Gujarat
2014	Anuj (Ramanuj) Sharma	Arts	Chhattisgarh
2014	Brahma Singh	Science & Engineering	Delhi
2014	Dinesh Singh	Literature & Education	Delhi
2014	Vinod K. Singh	Science & Engineering	Madhya Pradesh
2014	Yuvraj Singh	Sports	Haryana
2014	Santosh Sivan	Arts	Tamil Nadu
2014	Mamta Sodha	Sports	Haryana
2014	Mallika Srinivasan	Trade & Industry	Tamil Nadu
2014	Anumolu Sriramarao	Social Work	Andhra Pradesh
2014	Govindan Sundararajan	Science & Engineering	Andhra Pradesh
2014	Parveen Talha	Civil Service	Uttar Pradesh
2014	Sooni Taraporevala	Arts	Maharashtra
2014	J. S. Titiyal	Medicine	Delhi
2014	Tashi Tondup	Public Affairs	Jammu & Kashmir
2014	Om Prakash Upadhyaya	Medicine	Punjab
2014	Mahesh Verma	Medicine	Delhi
2015	Manjula Anagani	Medicine	Telangana
2015	Subbiah Arunan	Science & Engineering	Karnataka
2015	Huang Baosheng	Literature & Education	– (Note: Indicates a citizen of China)
2015	Bettina Bäumer	Literature & Education	Himachal Pradesh
2015	Naresh Bedi	Arts	Delhi
2015	Ashok Bhagat	Social Work	Jharkhand
2015	Sanjay Leela Bhansali	Arts	Maharashtra
2015	Jacques Blamont	Science & Engineering	– (Note: Indicates a citizen of France)
2015	Lakshmi Nandan Bora	Literature & Education	Assam
2015	Jean-Claude Carrière	Literature & Education	–
2015	Gyan Chaturvedi	Literature & Education	Madhya Pradesh
2015	Yogesh Kumar Chawla	Medicine	Chandigarh
2015	Nadarajan Raj Chetty	Literature & Education	–
2015	Jayakumari Chikkala	Medicine	Delhi
2015	Bibek Debroy	Literature & Education	Delhi
2015	Sarungbam Bimola Kumari Devi	Medicine	Manipur
2015	Ashok Gulati	Literature & Education	Delhi
2015	Randeep Guleria	Medicine	Delhi
2015	K. P. Haridas	Medicine	Kerala
2015	George L. Hart	Literature & Education	–
2015	Rahul Jain	Arts	Delhi
2015	Ravindra Jain	Arts	Maharashtra
2015	Sunil Jogi	Literature & Education	Delhi
2015	Prasoon Joshi	Arts	Maharashtra
2015	A. Kanyakumari	Arts	Tamil Nadu
2015	Prafulla Kar	Arts	Odisha
2015	Saba Anjum Karim	Sports	Chhattisgarh
2015	Usha Kiran Khan	Literature & Education	Bihar
2015	Rajesh Kotecha	Medicine	Rajasthan
2015	Alka Kriplani	Medicine	Delhi
2015	Harsh Kumar	Medicine	Delhi
2015	Narayana Purushothama Mallaya	Literature & Education	Kerala
2015	Lambert Mascarenhas	Literature & Education	Goa
2015	Janak Palta McGilligan	Social Work	Madhya Pradesh
2015	Meetha Lal Mehta (Note: Meetha Lal Mehta died on 7 December 2014, at the age of 75.)#	Social Work	Rajasthan
2015	Taarak Mehta	Literature & Education	Gujarat
2015	Veerendra Raj Mehta	Social Work	Delhi
2015	Tripti Mukherjee	Arts	–
2015	Neil Nongkynrih	Arts	Meghalaya
2015	Dattatreyudu Nori	Medicine	–
2015	Chewang Norphel	Others	Jammu & Kashmir
2015	T.V. Mohandas Pai	Trade & Industry	Karnataka
2015	Tejas Patel	Medicine	Gujarat
2015	Jadav Payeng	Others	Assam
2015	Raghu Ram Pillarisetti	Medicine	–
2015	Bimla Poddar	Social Work	Uttar Pradesh
2015	N. Prabhakar	Science & Engineering	Delhi
2015	Prahlada	Science & Engineering	Maharashtra
2015	Narendra Prasad	Medicine	Bihar
2015	Ram Bahadur Rai	Literature & Education	Delhi
2015	Mithali Raj	Sports	Telangana
2015	Amrta Suryananda Maha Raja	Others	– (Note: Indicates a citizen of Portugal)
2015	P. V. Rajaraman	Civil Service	Tamil Nadu
2015	J. S. Rajput	Literature & Education	Uttar Pradesh
2015	Kota Srinivasa Rao	Arts	Andhra Pradesh
2015	Saumitra Rawat	Medicine	–
2015	H. Thegtse Rinpoche	Others	Arunachal Pradesh
2015	Bimal Kumar Roy	Literature & Education	West Bengal
2015	Annette Schmiedchen	Literature & Education	–
2015	Shekhar Sen	Arts	Maharashtra
2015	Gunvant Shah	Literature & Education	Gujarat
2015	Brahmdev Sharma	Literature & Education	Delhi
2015	Manu Sharma	Literature & Education	Uttar Pradesh
2015	Pran Kumar Sharma (Note: Pran Kumar Sharma died on 5 August 2014, at the age of 75.)#	Arts	Delhi
2015	Yog Raj Sharma	Medicine	Delhi
2015	Vasant Shastri	Science & Engineering	Karnataka
2015	S. K. Shivkumar	Science & Engineering	Karnataka
2015	P. V. Sindhu	Sports	Telangana
2015	Sardara Singh	Sports	Haryana
2015	Arunima Sinha	Sports	Uttar Pradesh
2015	Mahesh Raj Soni	Arts	Rajasthan
2015	Nikhil Tandon	Medicine	Delhi
2015	Hargovind Laxmishanker Trivedi	Medicine	Gujarat
2015	R. Vasudevan (Note: R. Vasudevan died on 25 July 2010, at the age of 68.)#	Civil Service	Tamil Nadu
2016	Mylswamy Annadurai	Science & Engineering	Karnataka
2016	Malini Awasthi	Arts	Uttar Pradesh
2016	Ajaypal Singh Banga	Trade & Industry	–
2016	Dhirendra Nath Bezbaruah	Literature & Education	Assam
2016	Madhur Bhandarkar	Arts	Maharashtra
2016	S. L. Bhyrappa	Literature & Education	Karnataka
2016	Madeleine Herman de Blic	Social Work	Puducherry
2016	Tulsidas Borkar	Arts	Goa
2016	Kameshwar Brahma	Literature & Education	Assam
2016	Gopi Chand Mannam	Medicine	Telangana
2016	Praveen Chandra	Medicine	Delhi
2016	Mamta Chandrakar	Arts	Chhattisgarh
2016	Dipankar Chatterji	Science & Engineering	Karnataka
2016	Priyanka Chopra	Arts	Maharashtra
2016	Madhu Pandit Dasa	Social Work	Karnataka
2016	Ajay Devgan	Arts	Maharashtra
2016	Sushil Doshi	Sports	Madhya Pradesh
2016	Ajoy Kumar Dutta	Social Work	Assam
2016	John Ebnezar	Medicine	Karnataka
2016	Bhikhudan Gadhvi	Arts	Gujarat
2016	Daljeet Singh Gambhir	Medicine	Uttar Pradesh
2016	Keki Hormusji Gharda	Trade & Industry	Maharashtra
2016	Soma Ghosh	Arts	Uttar Pradesh
2016	A. G. K. Gokhale	Medicine	Andhra Pradesh
2016	Laxma Goud	Arts	Telangana
2016	Saeed Jaffrey (Note: Saeed Jaffrey died on 15 November 2015, at the age of 86.)#	Arts	–
2016	M. M. Joshi	Medicine	Karnataka
2016	Damal Kandalai Srinivasan	Social Work	Tamil Nadu
2016	Ravi Kant	Medicine	Uttar Pradesh
2016	Jawahar Lal Kaul	Literature & Education	Jammu & Kashmir
2016	Salman Amin "Sal" Khan	Literature & Education	–
2016	Sunitha Krishnan	Social Work	Telangana
2016	Venkatesh Kumar	Arts	Karnataka
2016	Satish Kumar	Science & Engineering	Delhi
2016	Deepika Kumari	Sports	Jharkhand
2016	Shiv Narain Kureel	Medicine	Uttar Pradesh
2016	T. K. Lahiri	Medicine	Uttar Pradesh
2016	Naresh Chander Lal	Arts	Andaman & Nicobar Islands
2016	Jai Prakash Lekhiwal	Arts	Delhi
2016	Anil Kumari Malhotra	Medicine	Delhi
2016	Ashok Malik	Literature & Education	Delhi
2016	M. N. Krishnamani	Public Affairs	Delhi
2016	Mahesh Chandra Mehta	Public Affairs	Delhi
2016	Sundar Menon	Social Work	–
2016	Bhalchandra Dattatray Mondhe	Arts	Madhya Pradesh
2016	Arunachalam Muruganantham	Social Work	Tamil Nadu
2016	Haldhar Nag	Literature & Education	Odisha
2016	Ravindra Nagar	Literature & Education	Delhi
2016	H. R. Nagendra	Others	Karnataka
2016	P. Gopinathan Nair	Social Work	Kerala
2016	T. V. Narayana	Social Work	Telangana
2016	Yarlagadda Nayudamma	Medicine	Andhra Pradesh
2016	Ujjwal Nikam	Public Affairs	Maharashtra
2016	Predrag K. Nikic	Others	– (Note: Indicates a citizen of Serbia)
2016	Sudharak Olwe	Social Work	Maharashtra
2016	Simon Oraon	Others	Jharkhand
2016	Subhash Palekar	Others	Maharashtra
2016	Nila Madhab Panda	Arts	Delhi
2016	Piyush Pandey	Others	Maharashtra
2016	Pushpesh Pant	Literature & Education	Delhi
2016	Michael Postel	Arts	–
2016	Pratibha Prahlad	Arts	Delhi
2016	Imitiaz Qureshi	Others	Delhi
2016	S. S. Rajamouli	Arts	Telangana
2016	Dilip Shanghvi	Trade & Industry	Maharashtra
2016	Gulabo Sapera	Arts	Rajasthan
2016	Sabya Sachi Sarkar	Medicine	Uttar Pradesh
2016	Tokheho Sema	Public Affairs	Nagaland
2016	Sudhir V. Shah	Medicine	Gujarat
2016	Mahesh Sharma	Trade & Industry	Delhi
2016	Dahyabhai Shastri	Literature & Education	Gujarat
2016	Ram Harsh Singh	Medicine	Uttar Pradesh
2016	Ravindra Kumar Sinha	Others	Bihar
2016	M. V. Padma Srivastava	Medicine	Delhi
2016	Onkar Nath Srivastava	Science & Engineering	Uttar Pradesh
2016	Saurabh Srivastava	Trade & Industry	Delhi
2016	Sribhas Chandra Supakar	Arts	Uttar Pradesh
2016	Prakash Chand Surana (Note: Prakash Chand Surana died on 4 February 2015.)#	Arts	Rajasthan
2016	Veena Tandon	Science & Engineering	Meghalaya
2016	Prahlad Chandra Tasa	Literature & Education	Assam
2016	T. S. Chandrasekar	Medicine	Tamil Nadu
2016	G. D. Yadav	Science & Engineering	Maharashtra
2016	Hui Lan Zhang	Others	–
2017	Anant Agarwal	Literature & Education	
2017	Eli Ahmed	Literature & Education	Assam
2017	Meenakshi Amma	Others	Kerala
2017	Girish Bharadwaj	Social Work	Karnataka
2017	Asoke Kumar Bhattacharyya	Others	West Bengal
2017	Nivedita Raghunath Bhide	Social Work	Tamil Nadu
2017	Basanti Bisht	Arts	Uttarakhand
2017	Mohan Reddy Venkatrama Bodanapu	Trade & Industry	Telangana
2017	Sukri Bommagowda	Arts	Karnataka
2017	Krishna Ram Chaudhary	Arts	Uttar Pradesh
2017	Tripuraneni Hanuman Chowdary	Civil Service	Telangana
2017	Michel Danino	Literature & Education	Tamil Nadu
2017	Subroto Das	Medicine	Gujarat
2017	Baua Devi	Arts	Bihar
2017	Appasaheb Dharmadhikari	Social Work	Maharashtra
2017	Balbir Dutt	Literature & Education	Jharkhand
2017	Bipin Ganatra	Social Work	West Bengal
2017	Tilak Gitai	Arts	Rajasthan
2017	Madan Madhav Godbole	Medicine	Uttar Pradesh
2017	Jitendra Nath Goswami	Science & Engineering	Assam
2017	Vikas Gowda	Sports	Karnataka
2017	Karimul Haque	Social Work	West Bengal
2017	Jitendra Haripal	Arts	Odisha
2017	Sanjeev Kapoor	Others	Maharashtra
2017	Dipa Karmakar	Sports	Tripura
2017	Kailash Kher	Arts	Maharashtra
2017	Narendra Kohli	Literature & Education	Delhi
2017	Virat Kohli	Sports	Delhi
2017	Anuradha Koirala	Social Work	(Note: Indicates a citizen of Nepal)
2017	V. Koteswaramma	Literature & Education	Andhra Pradesh
2017	Deepa Malik	Sports	Haryana
2017	Sakshi Malik	Sports	Haryana
2017	Chintakindi Mallesham	Science & Engineering	Telangana
2017	Suhas Vitthal Mapuskar#	Social Work	Maharashtra
2017	Sadhu Meher	Arts	Odisha
2017	Mukut Minz	Medicine	Chandigarh
2017	Aruna Mohanty	Arts	Odisha
2017	Birkha Bahadur Muringla	Literature & Education	Sikkim
2017	T. K. Murthy	Arts	Tamil Nadu
2017	Shekhar Naik	Sports	Karnataka
2017	Chemanchery Kunhiraman Nair	Arts	Kerala
2017	Akkitham Achuthan Namboothiri	Literature & Education	Kerala
2017	Mukund Nayak	Arts	Jharkhand
2017	Wareppa Naba Nil	Arts	Manipur
2017	Kashi Nath Pandita	Literature & Education	Jammu & Kashmir
2017	Vishnu Pandya	Literature & Education	Gujarat
2017	V. G. Patel	Literature & Education	Gujarat
2017	Devendra Dayabhai Patel	Medicine	Gujarat
2017	Genabhai Dargabhai Patel	Others	Gujarat
2017	Anuradha Paudwal	Arts	Maharashtra
2017	Chandrakant Pithawa	Science & Engineering	Telangana
2017	Parassala B. Ponnammal	Arts	Kerala
2017	Daripalli Ramaiah	Social Work	Telangana
2017	Aekka Yadagiri Rao	Arts	Telangana
2017	Ajoy Kumar Ray	Science & Engineering	West Bengal
2017	Balbir Singh Seechewal	Social Work	Punjab
2017	H. R. Shah	Literature & Education	
2017	Arun Kumar Sharma	Others	Chhattisgarh
2017	Chamu Krishna Shastry	Literature & Education	Delhi
2017	P. R. Shreejesh	Sports	Kerala
2017	Kanwal Sibal	Civil Service	Delhi
2017	Laishram Birendrakumar Singh	Arts	Manipur
2017	Harkishan Singh	Medicine	Chandigarh
2017	Suniti Solomon (Note: Suniti Solomon died on 28 July 2015, at the age of 76.)#	Medicine	Tamil Nadu
2017	Bhawana Somaaya	Literature & Education	Maharashtra
2017	Punam Suri	Literature & Education	Delhi
2017	Mariyappan Thangavelu	Sports	Tamil Nadu
2017	Harihar Kripalu Tripathi	Literature & Education	Uttar Pradesh
2017	Purushottam Upadhyay	Arts	Gujarat
2017	G. Venkatasubbiah	Literature & Education	Karnataka
2017	Bharathi Vishnuvardhan	Arts	Karnataka
2017	T. K. Viswanathan	Civil Service	Haryana
2017	Mohammed Abdul Waheed	Medicine	Telangana
2017	Bhakti Yadav	Medicine	Madhya Pradesh
2018	Abhay and Rani Bang	Medicine	Maharashtra
2018	Damodar Bapat	Social Work	Chhattisgarh
2018	Prafulla Baruah	Literature & Education	Assam
2018	Mohan Swaroop Bhatia	Arts	Uttar Pradesh
2018	Sudhanshu Biswas	Social Work	West Bengal
2018	Saikhom Mirabai Chanu	Sports	Manipur
2018	Shyamlal Chaturvedi	Literature & Education	Chhattisgarh
2018	Jose Ma Joey Concepcion III	Trade & Industry	– (Note: Indicates a citizen of Philippines)
2018	Langpoklakpam Subadani Devi	Arts	Manipur
2018	Somdev Devvarman	Sports	Tripura
2018	Yeshi Dhonden	Medicine	Himachal Pradesh
2018	Arup Kumar Dutta	Literature & Education	Assam
2018	Doddarange Gowda	Arts	Karnataka
2018	Arvind Gupta	Literature & Education	Maharashtra
2018	Digamber Hansda	Literature & Education	Jharkhand
2018	Ramli bin Ibrahim	Arts	– (Note: Indicates a citizen of Malaysia)
2018	Anwar Jalalpuri (Note: Anwar Jalalpuri died on 2 January 2018, at the age of 71.)#	Literature & Education	Uttar Pradesh
2018	Piyong Temjen Jamir	Literature & Education	Nagaland
2018	Sitavva Joddati	Social work	Karnataka
2018	Manoj Joshi	Arts	Maharashtra
2018	Malti Joshi	Literature & Education	Madhya Pradesh
2018	Rameshwarlal Kabra	Trade & Industry	Maharashtra
2018	Pran Kishore Kaul	Arts	Jammu & Kashmir
2018	Bounlap Keokangna	Others	– (Note: Indicates a citizen of Laos)
2018	Vijay Kichlu	Arts	West Bengal
2018	Tommy Koh	Public Affairs	– (Note: Indicates a citizen of Singapore)
2018	Lakshmikutty	Medicine	Kerala
2018	Joyasree Goswami Mahanta	Literature & Education	Assam
2018	Narayan Das Maharaj	Others	Rajasthan
2018	Pravakara Maharana	Arts	Orissa
2018	Hun Many	Public Affairs	– (Note: Indicates a citizen of Cambodia)
2018	Nouf Marwaai	Others	– (Note: Indicates a citizen of Saudi Arabia)
2018	Zaverilal Mehta	Literature & Education	Gujarat
2018	Krishna Bihari Mishra	Literature & Education	West Bengal
2018	Sisir Mishra	Arts	Maharashtra
2018	Subhasini Mistry	Social work	West Bengal
2018	Tomio Mizokami	Literature & Education	–
2018	Somdet Phra Maha Muniwong	Others	– (Note: Indicates a citizen of Thailand)
2018	Keshav Rao Musalgaonkar	Literature & Education	Madhya Pradesh
2018	Thant Myint-U	Public Affairs	– (Note: Indicates a citizen of Myanmar)
2018	V. Nanammal	Others	Tamil Nadu
2018	Sulagitti Narasamma	Social work	Karnataka
2018	Vijayalakshmi Navaneethakrishnan	Arts	Tamil Nadu
2018	I Nyoman Nuarta	Arts	– (Note: Indicates a citizen of Indonesia)
2018	Malai Haji Abdullah Bin Malai Haji Othman	Social work	– (Note: Indicates a citizen of Brunei)
2018	Gobardhan Panika	Arts	Odisha
2018	Bhabani Charan Pattanayak	Public Affairs	Orissa
2018	Murlikant Petkar	Sports	Maharashtra
2018	Habibullo Rajabov	Literature & Education	– (Note: Indicates a citizen of Tajikistan)
2018	M. R. Rajagopal	Medicine	Kerala
2018	Sampat Ramteke (Note: Salik Lucknawi died on 4 January 2013, at the age of 100.)#	Social work	Maharashtra
2018	Chandra Sekhar Rath	Literature & Education	Orissa
2018	S. S. Rathore	Civil Service	Gujarat
2018	Amitava Roy	Science & Engineering	West Bengal
2018	Sanduk Ruit	Medicine	
2018	Vagish Shastri	Literature & Education	Uttar Pradesh
2018	R Sathyanarayana	Arts	Karnataka
2018	Pankaj M Shah	Medicine	Gujarat
2018	Bhajju Shyam	Arts	Madhya Pradesh
2018	Maharao Raghuveer Singh	Literature & Education	Rajasthan
2018	Srikanth Kidambi	Sports	Andhra Pradesh
2018	Ibrahim Sutar	Arts	Karnataka
2018	Lentina Ao Thakkar	Social Work	Nagaland
2018	Vikram Chandra Thakur	Science & Engineering	Uttarakhand
2018	R. N. Tharanathan and R. N. Thyagarajan	Arts	Karnataka
2018	Nguyen Tien Thien	Others	– (Note: Indicates a citizen of Vietnam)
2018	Rajagopalan Vasudevan	Science & Engineering	Tamil Nadu
2018	Manas Bihari Verma	Science & Engineering	Bihar
2018	Gangadhar Pantawane	Literature & Education	Maharashtra
2018	Romulus Whitaker	Others	Tamil Nadu
2018	Baba Yogendra	Arts	Madhya Pradesh
2018	A Zakia	Literature & Education	Mizoram
2019	Rajeshwar Acharya	Arts	Uttar Pradesh
2019	Bangaru Adigalar	Others	Tamil Nadu
2019	Illias Ali	Medicine	Assam
2019	Manoj Bajpayee	Arts	Maharashtra
2019	Uddhab Bharali	Science & Engineering	Assam
2019	Omesh Kumar Bharti	Medicine	Himachal Pradesh
2019	Pritam Bhartwan	Arts	Uttarakhand
2019	Jyoti Bhatt	Arts	Gujarat
2019	Dilip Chakravarty	Others	Delhi
2019	Mammen Chandy	Medicine	West Bengal
2019	Swapan Chaudhuri	Arts	West Bengal
2019	Kanwal Singh Chauhan	Others	Haryana
2019	Sunil Chhetri	Sports	Telangana
2019	Dinyar Contractor	Arts	Maharashtra
2019	Muktaben Pankajkumar Dagli	Social Work	Gujarat
2019	Babulal Dahiya	Others	Madhya Pradesh
2019	Thanga Darlong	Arts	Tripura
2019	Prabhu Deva	Arts	Karnataka
2019	Rajkumari Devi	Others	Bihar
2019	Bhagirathi Devi	Public Affairs	Bihar
2019	Baldev Singh Dhillon	Science & Engineering	Punjab
2019	Harika Dronavalli	Sports	Andhra Pradesh
2019	Godawari Dutta	Arts	Bihar
2019	Gautam Gambhir	Sports	Delhi
2019	Draupadi Ghimiray	Social Work	Sikkim
2019	Rohini Godbole	Science & Engineering	Karnataka
2019	Sandeep Guleria	Medicine	Delhi
2019	Pratap Singh Hardia	Medicine	Madhya Pradesh
2019	Bulu Imam	Social Work	Jharkhand
2019	Friederike Irina	Social Work	–
2019	Joravarsinh Jadav	Arts	Gujarat
2019	S. Jaishankar	Civil Service	Delhi
2019	Narsingh Dev Jamwal	Literature & Education	Jammu & Kashmir
2019	Fayaz Ahmad Jan	Arts	Jammu & Kashmir
2019	K. G. Jayan	Arts	Kerala
2019	Subhash Kak	Science & Engineering	–
2019	Sharath Kamal	Sports	Tamil Nadu
2019	Rajni Kant	Social Work	Uttar Pradesh
2019	Sudam Kate	Medicine	Maharashtra
2019	Waman Kendre	Arts	Maharashtra
2019	Kader Khan (Note: Kader Khan died on 31 December 2018, at the age of 81.)#	Arts	– (Note: Indicates a citizen of Canada)
2019	Abdul Gafur Khatri	Arts	Gujarat
2019	Ravindra and Smita Kolhe	Medicine	Maharashtra
2019	Bombayla Devi Laishram	Sports	Manipur
2019	Kailash Madbaiya	Literature & Education	Madhya Pradesh
2019	Ramesh Babaji Maharaj	Social Work	Uttar Pradesh
2019	Vallabhbhai Marvaniya	Others	Gujarat
2019	Shadab Mohammad	Medicine	Uttar Pradesh
2019	K. K. Muhammed	Others	Kerala
2019	Shyama Prasad Mukherjee	Medicine	Jharkhand
2019	Daitari Naik	Social Work	Odisha
2019	Shankar Mahadevan	Arts	Maharashtra
2019	Shantanu Narayen	Trade & Industry	–
2019	Nartaki Natraj	Arts	Tamil Nadu
2019	Tsering Norboo	Medicine	Jammu & Kashmir
2019	Anup Ranjan Pandey	Arts	Chhattisgarh
2019	Jagdish Prasad Parikh	Others	Rajasthan
2019	Ganpatbhai Patel	Literature & Education	–
2019	Bimal Patel	Others	Gujarat
2019	Hukumchand Patidar	Others	Rajasthan
2019	Harvinder Singh Phoolka	Public Affairs	Punjab
2019	Chinna Pillai	Social Work	Tamil Nadu
2019	Tao Porchon-Lynch	Others	–
2019	Kamala Pujhari	Others	Odisha
2019	Bajrang Punia	Sports	Haryana
2019	Jagat Ram	Medicine	Chandigarh
2019	R. V. Ramani	Medicine	Tamil Nadu
2019	Devarapalli Prakash Rao	Social Work	Odisha
2019	Anup Shah	Arts	Uttarakhand
2019	Milena Salvini	Arts	–
2019	Nagindas Sanghavi	Literature & Education	Maharashtra
2019	Sirivennela Seetharama Sastry	Arts	Telangana
2019	Shabbir Sayyad	Social Work	Maharashtra
2019	Mahesh Sharma	Social Work	Madhya Pradesh
2019	Mohammed Hanif Khan Shastri	Literature & Education	Delhi
2019	Brijesh Kumar Shukla	Literature & Education	Uttar Pradesh
2019	Narendra Singh	Others	Haryana
2019	Prashanti Singh	Sports	Uttar Pradesh
2019	Sultan Singh	Others	Haryana
2019	Jyoti Kumar Sinha	Social Work	Bihar
2019	Sivamani	Arts	Tamil Nadu
2019	Sharada Srinivasan	Others	Karnataka
2019	Devendra Swarup (Note: Devendra Swarup died on 14 January 2019, at the age of 93.)#	Literature & Education	Uttar Pradesh
2019	Ajay Thakur	Sports	Himachal Pradesh
2019	Rajeev Taranath	Arts	Karnataka
2019	Saalumarada Thimmakka	Social Work	Karnataka
2019	Jamuna Tudu	Social Work	Jharkhand
2019	Bharat Bhushan Tyagi	Others	Uttar Pradesh
2019	Ramaswami Venkataswami	Medicine	Tamil Nadu
2019	Ram Saran Verma	Others	Uttar Pradesh
2019	Swami Vishudhananda	Others	Kerala
2019	Hiralal Yadav	Arts	Uttar Pradesh
2019	Venkateswara Rao Yadlapalli	Others	Andhra Pradesh

== Explanatory notes ==
Non-citizen recipients

Posthumous recipients
