= Narsingh Dev Jamwal =

Indian writer and playwright from Jammu (born 1931)

- Born: 1931 (age 94–95); Jammu, Jammu and Kashmir, British India
- Writing career
- Notable awards: Padma Shri (2019); Sahitya Akademi Award

Narsingh Dev Jamwal (born 1931) is an Indian writer and playwright from Jammu, who has authored 48 books, including Sanjhi Dharti Bakhle Mahnu (novel), which won the Sahitya Akademi Award in 1978. He received India's fourth highest civilian award, Padma Shri (2019) for his contribution in the field of literature and education.

== Life ==
He was born in 1931 in Jammu. Jamwal completed his matriculation in 1945. On 23 October 1947, he was part of Subedar Duni Chand's platoon at "Battle of Garhi" led by Rajinder Singh (brigadier) and was jailed in Pakistan as a POW only to be released a year later. He joined the Jammu & Kashmir Police in 1953. He also holds a master's degree in Dogri from Jammu University.

In 1978, Narsingh Dev was honoured with a Sahitya Akademi Award for his novel in Dogri language, Sanjhi Dharti Bakhle Mahnu. In 2008, he was awarded the Sangeet Natak Akademi Award for his contribution to Indian theatre as a playwright.

== Plays ==
- Aan Maryada
- Mandlik, Pinjra
- Kaure Ghutt
- Sarkar
- Devyani
- Allad Goli Veer Sipahi

== Awards and recognition ==
- Padma Shri (2019)
- President's Police Medal (1986)
- Sahitya Akademi Award (1978)
- Sangeet Natak Akademi Award (2008)

== See also ==
- List of Padma Shri award recipients (2010–2019)
- List of Sahitya Akademi Award winners for Dogri
