= Devendra Swarup =

Indian writer, journalist, and RSS ideologue (1926–2019)

- Born: 1926; Moradabad district, Uttar Pradesh
- Died: 14 January 2019 (aged 92–93)
- Awards: Padma Shri (2019)
- Website: Official website

Devendra Swarup (1926 – 14 January 2019) was an Indian writer, journalist and RSS ideologue, who was awarded the Padma Shri, the fourth highest civilian award in India posthumously in 2019.

== Death ==
Devendra Swarup died on 14 January 2019, at the age of 93.

== See also ==
- List of Padma Shri award recipients (2010–2019)
