= Swami Vishudhananda =

Indian spiritual leader (born 1950)

- Born: 1950 (age 75–76); Chengannur, Kerala, India
- Occupation: Spiritual leader
- Known for: President of Sree Narayana Dharma Sangham
- Awards: Padma Shri, 2019

Swami Vishudhananda (born 1950) is an Indian spiritual leader, who is serving as the president of Sree Narayana Dharma Sangham, since his appointment in 2016. He was awarded the Padma Shri, the fourth highest civilian award in India in 2019. He is noted for preserving Maruthwamala at Sivagiri where Sree Narayana Guru used to meditate.

He served as general secretary of the Sree Narayana Dharma Sangham in 1982. During his tenure as president of Sangham, he started works to set up a deemed university for studies on the life and vision of Sree Narayana Guru.

== See also ==
- List of Padma Shri award recipients (2010–2019)
