= Anil Kumar Bhalla =

Indian transplant surgeon

Anil Kumar Bhalla, also known as Dr. (Prof.) A K Bhalla is an Indian kidney transplant surgeon from Delhi, currently holds the position of co-chairman, Department of Nephrology, Sir Ganga Ram Hospital. Bhalla was awarded the Padma Shri in 2010 for his contribution to the medical field science. The Padma Shri award is the fourth highest civilian honor in India. Dr. Bhalla also has served as a secretary of The Peritoneal Dialysis Society of India (PDSI) and he still holds the position of Chairperson of Industrial Liaison committee.

In the year 2019, he was awarded the Dr. B. C. Roy National Award for his work in medical field.

== See also ==
- List of Padma Shri award recipients (2010–19)
