= Bharat Bhushan Tyagi =

Indian farmer and educator

- Born: 1954 (age 71–72); Bulandshahar, Uttar Pradesh, India
- Occupations: Farmer, Educator
- Awards: Padma Shri, 2019; Prime Minister's Progressive Farmer Award

Bharat Bhushan Tyagi (born 1954) is an Indian farmer, educator and trainer from Bulandshahr, Uttar Pradesh, who was awarded the Padma Shri, the fourth highest civilian award in India, in 2019. He organises weekly training for farmers at Bulandshahr and has trained over 80,000 farmers. He is also a recipient of Progressive Farmer Award by the Prime Minister, Narendra Modi.

== Education and career ==
He is a science graduate from Delhi University. Tyagi has also worked with government associations like National Centre of Organic Farming, International Competence Centre for Organic Agriculture (ICCOA), Ministry of Agriculture (India), AFC, and National Bank for Agriculture and Rural Development.

== Awards and recognition ==
- Padma Shri, 2019
- Prime Minister's Progressive Farmer Award

== See also ==
- List of Padma Shri award recipients (2010–2019)
