= C. Venkata S. Ram =

Indian doctor

- Born: Machilipatnam, India
- Known for: Expertise in high blood pressure (Hypertension)
- Awards: 1. Padma Shri; 2. World Hypertension League/WHO alliance Presidential Award for Life-time achievements in the field of high blood pressure,2025 3. American Society of Hypertension, Life-time achievement Award; 4. American Association of cardiologists of Indian origin- Distinguished Physician; 5. World Telugu Association - Best Doctor Globally.
- Scientific career
- Fields: Medical science
- Institutions: Hyderabad, India, Dallas, USA

C. Venkata S. Ram is a global doctor who is an expert in the treatment of high blood pressure. He is the director of blood pressure clinics and institute for blood pressure management at Apollo Hospitals, and Apollo Medical College, Hyderabad, India. He is also the director of World Hypertension League South Asia region and Dean, Macquarie University, Medical School, India campus, Hyderabad, India. He is a professor of medicine/clinical at the University of Texas Southwestern Medical School, Dallas, USA and professor of medicine, Apollo Medical College, Hyderabad, India. He has authored 430 papers and 9 books, all in hypertension.

== Education and career ==
Ram attended St. Paul High School, Nizam College and Osmania Medical College, all in Hyderabad, India. Subsequently, he underwent additional post graduate training at Brown University, Providence, USA, and at the University of Pennsylvania, USA; served on the faculty of University of Texas Southwestern Medical Center, and Director of Hypertension Clinics, Parkland Memorial Hospital, Dallas, USA for more than 3 decades where he did considerable clinical and research work in addition to teaching undergraduate and post-graduate medical students. He served as the President of St.Paul University hospital, Dallas, USA, director of hypertension clinics at Parkland hospital/University of Texas, Southwestern Medical Center, Dallas, USA. He was the President of the Texas Indo-American Physicians Society and the American Association of Physicians from India. Also, was elected as the chairman of the board of governors, American Society of Hypertension and director, American Society of Hypertension and Specialists. Now on the executive committee of the World Hypertension League, and on the executive committee, faculty of medicine health sciences, Macquarie University, Sydney, Australia.

== Personal life ==
Ram is married to Ashalata. They have two daughters and four grandchildren. Two of them are twins.

== Awards ==
Received several awards including “PADMASHRI” from the government of India, the outstanding alumnus award from Osmania Medical College graduates’ alumni association. He was given the outstanding doctor award by the AP hospitals/nursing homes association and Telangana hospitals/nursing homes association. On the doctors’ day (2015), he was bestowed the best doctor award by the University of Hyderabad. Received numerous recognitions from the Cardiological Society of India, Indian Society of Hypertension, and Association of Physicians of India.

In U.S., he was given the awards (best clinician teacher) by the St.Paul University hospital, Dallas, Texas. American Society of Hypertension bestowed on him Life-time achievement award (The Moser award), Presidential Life-time achievement award from the World Hypertension League 2025.

== Books ==
1. Ram CVS. Hypertension: A Clinical guide. CRC Press/Taylor and Francis group, Boca Raton, London, and New York, 2014.
2. Ram CVS. Hypertension and Cardiovascular Disease: Current and Emerging Concepts. Euromed Communications passfield, U.K, 2014.
3. Ram CVS. Hypertension and Clinical Cardiology; Euromed Communications, passfield, U.K, 2013.
4. Ram CVS, Kaplan NM. Individualized Therapy of Hypertension. Marcel Dekker, Inc. New York, Basel, Hong Kong, 1995.
5. Ram CVS. Portraits of Hypertension, a pictorial book. IPCA Laboratories, Mumbai, India, 2017.
6. Ram CVS (Editor-in-chief). Hypertension Reviews 2020, official book of the Cardiological Society of India, Incessant Nature Science Publishers, Noida, India, 2020.
7. Ram CVS (Editor-in-chief). Hypertension Reviews 2021, official book of the Cardiological Society of India, Incessant Nature Science Publishers, Noida, India, 2021.
8. Ram CVS, Teo BWJ, Wander GS (Editors). Hypertension and Cardiovascular Disease in Asia. Published by the European Society of Hypertension, and Springer Nature, Switzerland, 2022.
9. Ram CVS, Kreutz R. Clinical Hypertension – A Compendium of Interesting Case Reports. Indo-European Hypertension Collegium. Incessant Nature Science Publishers, Noida, U.P, India, 2022.

== See also ==
- List of Padma Shri award recipients (2010–2019)
