= Kanwal Singh Chauhan =

Indian farmer from Haryana, India

- Citizenship: India
- Education: LLB
- Occupations: Farmer, Entrepreneur
- Awards: Padma Shri (2019)

Kanwal Singh Chauhan is an Indian farmer from Haryana, India. He is known for his contributions to crop diversification in the agriculture industry. In January 2019, he was awarded Padma Shri, India's fourth highest civilian award. He was honoured with N. G.Ranga Farmer Award 2010 by Indian Council of Agricultural Research in August 2011.

== Biography ==
Kanwal Singh Chauhan was raised in Aterna, a village in Sonipat district of Haryana. Chauhan began farming at the age of 15. In 1997 he began farming baby corn at a time when the main source of the vegetable was imports from Thailand at the price of ₹4000 per kg. He introduced baby corn to the region and began selling it at a price of ₹70 per kg. By 2009, he had expanded into the production of canned baby corn as well as exports. His business, which started as a one-man enterprise, grew to employ over 200 employees by 2019. He also established a fair price system for farmers growing mushroom, babycorn, sweetcorn and tomato.

In 2001, he founded the Gulab Fruits & Vegetable Growers & Marketing Cooperative Society in Sonipat, a cooperative dedicated to the production, marketing, and export of vegetables such as baby corn, sweet corn, mushrooms, and broccoli. The cooperative conducts various training programs to promote agricultural diversification in India. In 2012, it established a processing unit for the canning and sale of vegetables, minimising waste. Chauhan also founded the Integrated Unit for Mushroom Development in 2008, a mushroom manufacturing business.

In light of the 2020–2021 Indian farmers' protest against agricultural deregulation, Chauhan spoke in favour of the Modi government's actions, saying that farmers' concerns were "misguided. After extending support to the government over the new farm laws, he received threat calls from unidentified callers. He is the President of Sonipat's Progressive Farmers Club.

== Awards and recognition ==
- He was awarded India's fourth highest civilian award Padma Shri in 2019.
- In 2010, he was conferred with the NG Ranga Farmer Award for diversification in agriculture by the Indian Council of Agricultural Research (ICAR), the Ministry of Agriculture and Farmers Welfare, Government of India.
- He received the Mahindra Krishi Samrat Award - 2015 by Mahindra Tractors.
- He was awarded the AIFA Progressive Farmer Award 2017 by the All India Farmers Alliance (AIFA) and

== See also ==
- List of Padma Shri award recipients (2010–2019)
