= Mamraj Agrawal =

Indian social worker

- Born: Kolkata, West Bengal, India
- Occupation: Social worker
- Awards: Padma Shri
- Website: Official web site

Mamraj Agrawal is an Indian social worker from Kolkata, West Bengal and the founder of Mamraj Agarwal Foundation, a Kolkata-based non governmental organization known to be involved in charity and philanthropic efforts.

== Work and recognition ==
Through the foundation, Agrawal is involved in social service in education, healthcare and rehabilitation sectors. He was honored by the Government of India, in 2011, with the fourth highest Indian civilian award of Padma Shri.
