= Michael Postel =

French archaeologist and philanthropist

- Occupations: Pharmacologist; Art collector
- Years active: Since 1949
- Known for: Musée Asiatica
- Spouse: Xintian Zhu
- Awards: Padma Shri

Michael Postel (born 7 April 1926 – 2024) is a French pharmacologist and art collector, known for his contribution of the art collections to Musée Asiatica, a Biarritz-based museum dedicated to Chinese and Indian art. He is the founder president of Franco-Indian Pharmaceuticals, a drug manufacturing company set up in 1949. Postel, who reached India in 1949 on business related to his pharmaceutical company, started collecting Indian art and, over the years, gathered a collection of over 1,600 pieces. Later, he donated his entire collection to Musee Asiatica. In 2016 the Government of India awarded him the fourth highest civilian honour of the Padma Shri for his contributions to Art.

== See also ==
- Indian art

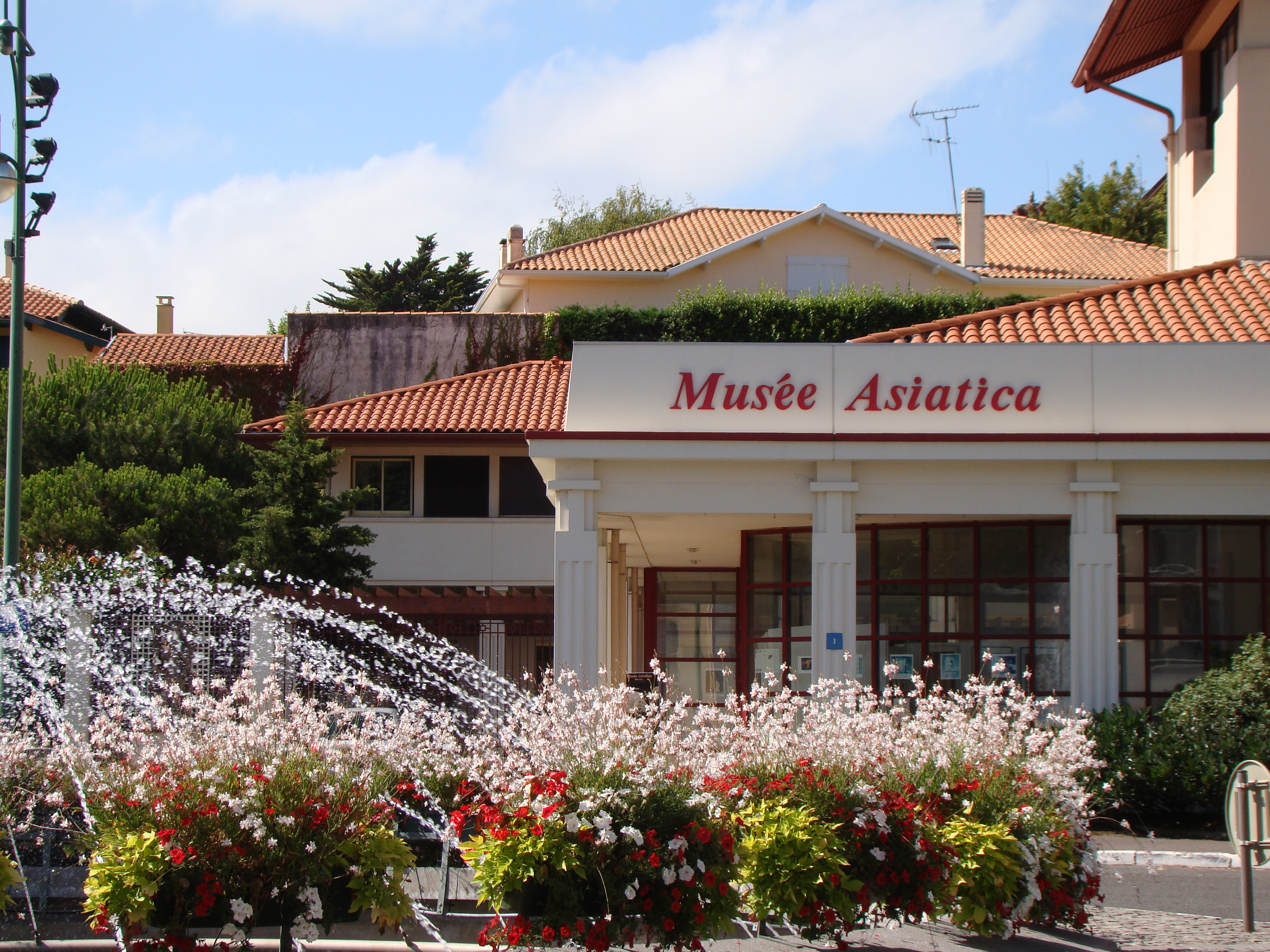
Musée Asiatica
