= Predrag K. Nikić =

Yoga teacher

- Born: Serbia
- Occupation: Yoga exponent
- Known for: Yoga intelligence concept
- Awards: Padma Shri

Predrag K. Nikić is a Yoga exponent and the Honorary president of the Yoga Federation of Serbia. He is the President of the General Assembly of the Yoga Federation of Europe.

== Early life ==
He received his doctoral degree in Emotional Intelligence, he is a professor of Yoga at the International Academy for Yoga Teachers Education. He conducted his first postdoctoral research in the field of Yoga Intelligence in 2013 at the Institute Patanjđali, Haridwar, India and second, during 2014–15 at the University Vivekananda, Bangalore, India. He serves as the president of the International Society for Scientific Interdisciplinary Researches in the Field of Yoga and the World Commission of Scientific Yoga Research and as an international adviser to the World Yoga Council of the International Yoga Federation. He is known to have created the concept of Yoga Intelligence and is the founder of Sense, an international yoga journal.

== Awards ==
The Government of India awarded him the fourth highest civilian honour of the Padma Shri, in 2016, for his contributions to society.

== See also ==
- Yoga
