= Waikhom Gojen Meitei =

Indian poet

- Born: Manipur, India
- Occupations: Poet, educationist
- Awards: Padma Shri; Special Jury Prize; Babu Jagat Jiban

Waikhom Gojen Meitei is an Indian poet and educationist from Manipur. In 2014, the Government of India honored him with the Padma Shri, the country's fourth-highest civilian award, for his contributions to the fields of education and literature.

== Biography ==
Waikhom Gojen Meitei was born in Manipur. He is the Secretary of Meetei Erol Eyek Loinasillon Apunba Manipur (MEELAL). His contributions to the revival of Meitei indigenous script is notable.

Meitei resides at Ambedkar Bhawan in New Delhi. He is also a recipient of the title, Babu Jagat Jiban by Ram Lala Sanskriti Sahitya Academy in January 2002. In 2013, he received the Special Jury prize at the Second Sahitya Seva Samiti Manipuri Film Awards, for his song Eeyekna Eepani Eerolna Eemani for the film, Eikhoibusu Hinghanbiyu.
