= Nameirakpam Ibemni Devi =

Indian singer of traditional music (1926–2020)

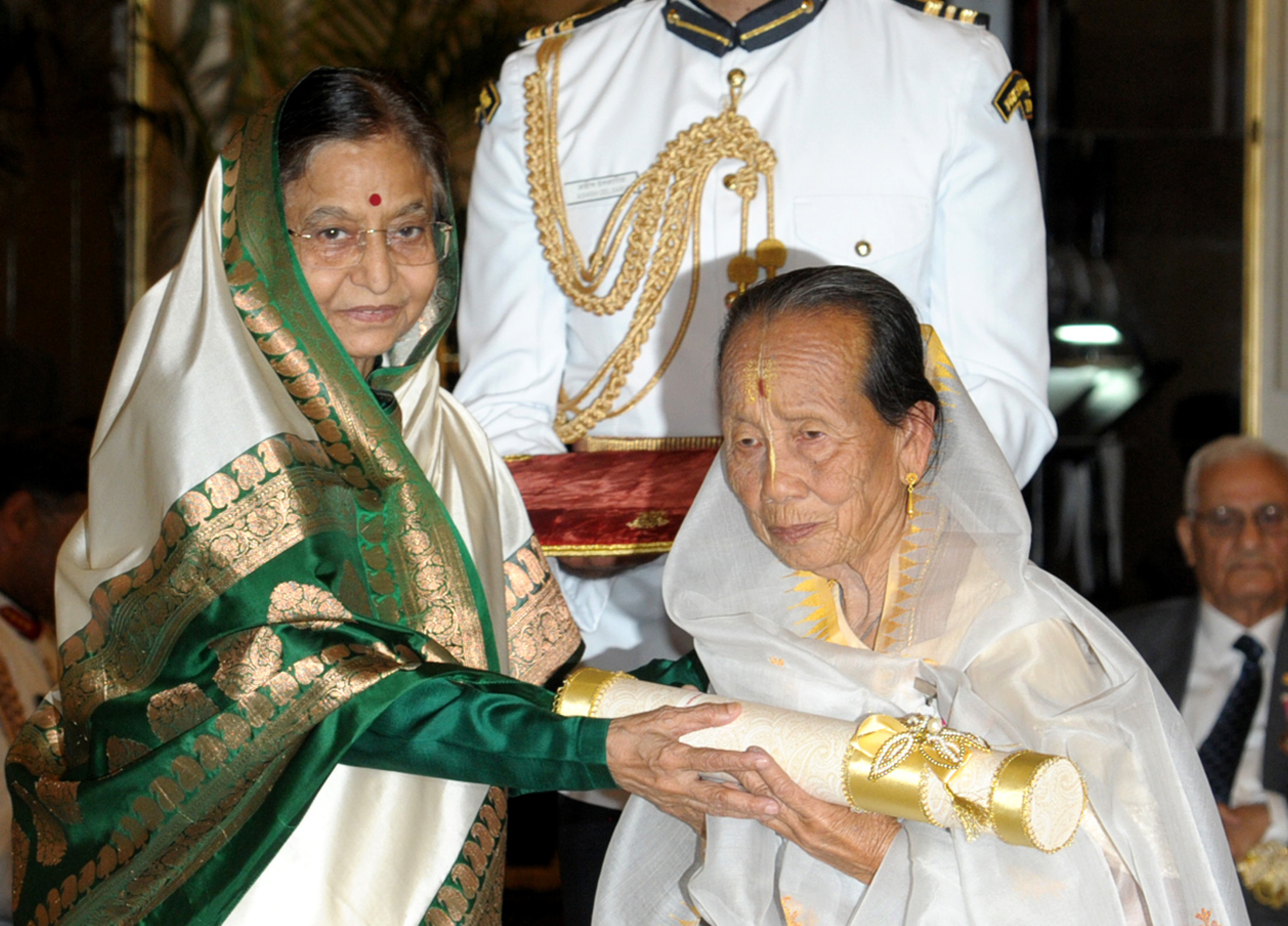
- President Pratibha Devisingh Patil presenting the Padma Shri Award to Nameirakpam Ibemni Devi in 2012
- Born: 7 July 1926; Wangkhei Ningthempukhri Mapal, Manipur, India
- Died: 24 January 2020 (aged 93)
- Occupation: Traditional singer
- Spouse: Nameirakpam Achou Singh
- Parent(s): Khumanthem Chaoba Singh; Kshetrimayum ningol Keina Devi
- Awards: Padma Shri; Joy Patra; Manipur State Kala Akademi Award; Government of Manipur Certificate of Honour; Sangeet Natak Akademi Award; Manipur Sahitya Parishad Award
- Website: Official web site

Khumanthem Ningol Nameirakpam Ongbi Ibemni Devi (7 July 1926 – 24 January 2020) was an Indian singer of traditional music, known for her expertise in the Khongjom Praba genre of Manipuri music. The Government of India honoured Ibemni Devi in 2012, with the fourth highest civilian award of Padma Shri.

== Biography ==
Nameirakpam Ibemni Devi was born in July 1926 at Wangkhei Ningthempukhri Mapal to Kshetrimayum ningol Keina Devi and Khumanthem Chaoba Singh, a noted exponent of Khongjom Parba. She started learning traditional Manipuri music at the age of six under the tutelage of Guru Yumnam Natum Singh, a known singer of Nata Sangeet. Besides Nata Sangeet, she also learnt other genres of Manipuri music.

Ibemni Devi, reported to be the first female to play Khol, Mridanga and Dolak in Manipuri folk theatre, is credited with the composition of over 150 ballads which have been aired by the All India Radio and Doordarshan and performed at many events. She is the founder of Khongjom Praba School (1964), and has also established two choir groups, one in 1964 and the other in 1972.

Ibemni Devi was a recipient of the Joy Patra of the Manipur Royal Palace in 1964, the Manipur State Kala Akademi Award in 1989 and a Certificate of Honour from the Government of Manipur in 1991. Recognized in 1998, as one of the ten outstanding artistes by the All India Radio, Ibemni Devi was honoured by the Sangeet Natak Akademi in 2004, and by the Manipur Sahitya Parishad in 2005. The Government of India, in 2011, honored Ibemni Devi with the civilian award of Padma Shri.

Devi was married to Nameirakpam Achou Singh and the couple had eight children; five sons and three daughters. Her husband predeceased her and she lived in Kwakeithel Soibam Leikai, until her death on 24 January 2020, at the age of 93.
