= R. Vasudevan =

Indian civil servant (1942–2010)

- Born: 27 March 1942; Tamil Nadu, India
- Died: 25 July 2010 (aged 68)
- Occupation: Civil servant
- Awards: Padma Shri

R. Vasudevan was an Indian civil servant, and served as special secretary to the Prime Minister of India (Rajiv Gandhi), as also Secretary, Ministry of Steel and Ministry of Power, Government of India. Born in the South Indian state of Tamil Nadu, Vasudevan was the holder of master's degrees in Economics from the University of Delhi and in public administration from Harvard University. He died on 25 July 2010. The Government of India honoured him, posthumously, in 2015, with the award of Padma Shri, the fourth highest Indian civilian award.

== See also ==
- Indian Administrative Service
