= Mohanlal Chaturbhuj Kumhar =

Indian artist and Founder of Molela Art

Padma Shri Mohanlal Kumhar
- Born: Mohanlal Kumhar; 4 February 1939 (age 87); Rajasthan, India
- Died: 7 July 2023 (aged 84)
- Known for: Terracotta art
- Awards: Padma Shri

Padma Shri Mohanlal Chaturbhuj Kumhar (born 4 February 1939) is an Indian artist. He won the Shilp Guru award in 2003 for his skills in terracotta sculpture. Born in 1939, he is resident of Nathdwara. Kumhar was also awarded the Kalamani for his works in terracotta in 23rd Surajkund Crafts Mela. He has participated in promoting this traditional art in various countries like Spain, USA and Australia. The Government of India awarded him the civilian honour of Padma Shri in 2012.

== Awards ==
- 1988 Master Craftsman National Award
- 1984 State Award
- 2003 Shilp Guru Award
- 2001 Maharana Shajansingh Award
- 1997 Raj Ratan Award
- 1991 Kala Shree Award
- 2003 Shilp guru award
- 2012 PADMA SHRI Award
