= Shyamlal Chaturvedi =

Indian journalist and poet (1926–2018)

Pandit Shyamlal Chaturvedi
- Born: 1926
- Died: 7 December 2018 (aged 91–92)
- Citizenship: India
- Occupations: Journalist, author
- Writing career
- Language: Hindi
- Notable awards: Pandit Sundarlal Sharma Rajya Alankaran (2004); Padma Shri (2018)

Shyamlal Chaturvedi (1926 – 7 December 2018) was a journalist and poet from the Indian state of Chhattisgarh. He was conferred the Padma Shri civilian honour in the field of literature and education, in the year 2018.

== Early life ==
Chaturvedi was born in Kotumi village in Bilaspur district of Chhattisgarh.

== Education ==
Chaturvedi earned a Master's degree through private coaching.

== Career ==
Chaturvedi was a representative of the Navbharat Times and Jansatta, and worked with various other newspapers in Bilaspur district. Later, he became the first chairperson of the Chhattisgarh Rajbhasha Commission. In a career spanning seven decades, he contributed to folk literature with various creative work, among them Bholwa Bholaram Banis and Parra Bar Lahee were most popular.

On the occasion of Rajyotsav in 2004, Chaturvedi was given the Pandit Sundarlal Sharma Rajya Alankaran honour. He was conferred the Padma Shri civilian honour in the field of literature and education, in the year 2018.

== Death ==
Chaturvedi died of old age on 7 December 2018.
