= Subhasini Mistry =

Indian social worker (born 1943)

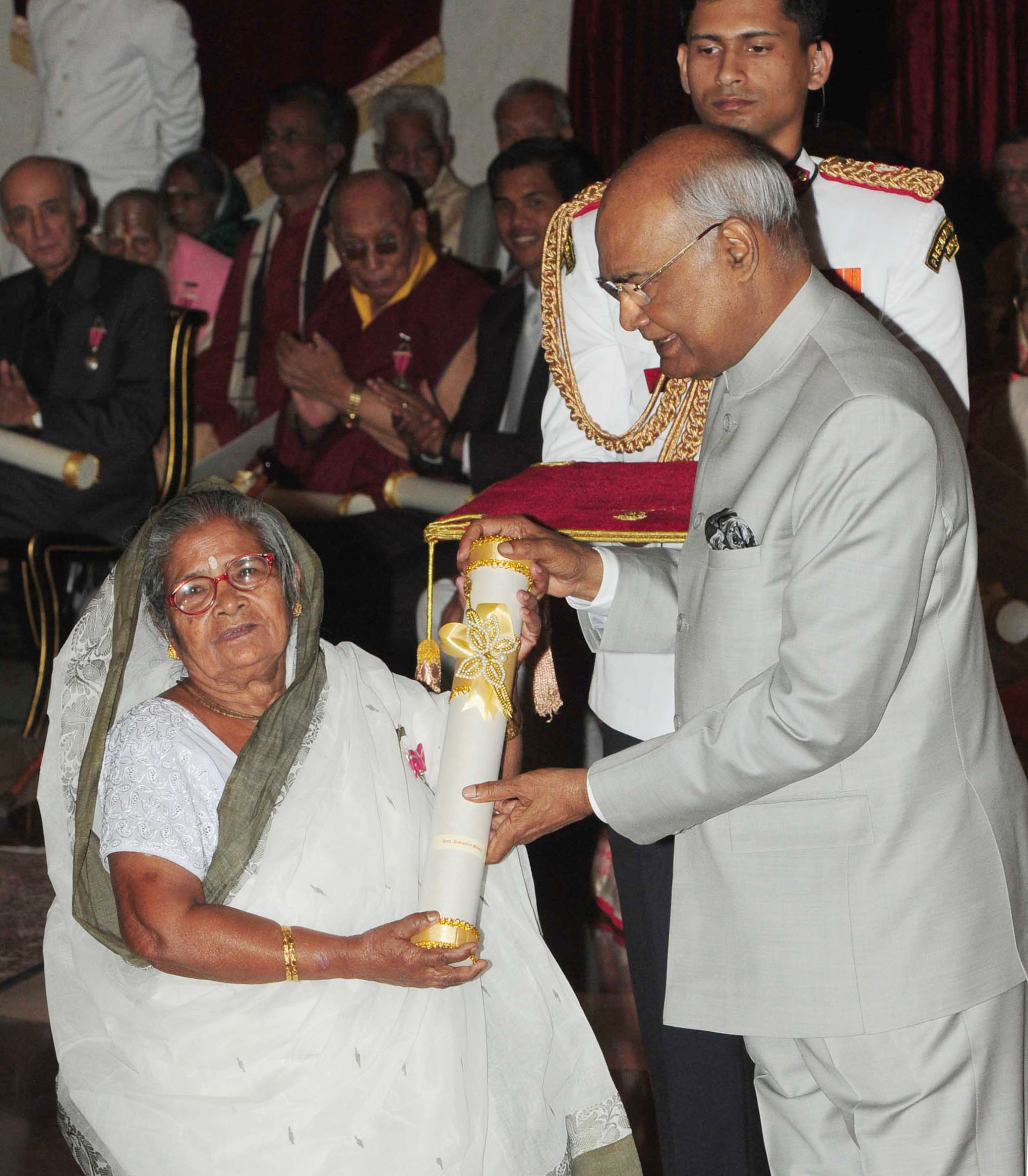
The President, Shri Ram Nath Kovind presenting the Padma Shri Award to Smt. Subasini Mistry, at the Civil Investiture Ceremony, at Rashtrapati Bhavan, in New Delhi (2018).

Subhasini Mistry (born 1943) is an Indian social worker. She became a widow at the age of 23 and was left with four children. She struggled in life working as a house maid, selling vegetables and worked as a manual labourer. She went on to build a charitable hospital called "Humanity Hospital" for the poor. In 2018, the Government of India awarded her the Padma Shri, India's fourth highest civilian award, in recognition of her social work. She was also one of the 12 recipients of the Women Transforming India Awards in 2017.

== Early life and works ==
Subhasini Mistry was born in 1943 in kalua village in Kolkata into a poor farmer's family. She was married at the age of 12. Her husband, a vegetable vendor, died 12 years later because he was unable to get medical help for a common ailment. He left her to look after four children. Soon after his death, Mistry decided that she would not let anyone else face the same kind of difficulties that her husband had to face due to lack of access to healthcare. A young widow without any education, she worked as a manual labourer, vegetable vendor and domestic help for 20 years, and earned a little more than 100 rupees a month. She spent some money on her son Ajay's education and where he finally was able to attend medical school and became a medical doctor. In 1992, after many years of saving money, she used her lifelong savings to buy an acre of land in Hanspukur village. She finally opened a one-room clinic and soon her son joined as a doctor. In 1993, the clinic treated 250 people with volunteer doctors and expanded into a hospital in 1995. Today, the Humanity Hospital has since expanded into a 45-bed hospital that spread over three acres and has the best of medical equipment. She currently owns two hospitals, one located in her village (the village into which she was married; that is, her husband's native village) in Hanskhali, Nadia district, and another at Sundarbans.

For her dedication to serving the society at various platforms, she won the prestigious Godfrey Phillips National Bravery Award in the mind-of-steel category in 2009, and also has been awarded the country's fourth-highest civilian award, Padma Shri in 2018.
