= Sudha Kaul =

Indian social worker

- Born: India
- Occupation: Social worker
- Awards: Padma Shri
- Website: Official web site

Sudha Kaul is an Indian social worker and educationist, known for her services for the rehabilitation of physically disabled people. Dr. Kaul is the vice chairperson of the Indian Institute of Cerebral Palsy (IICP) and the founder Principal of the Centre for Special Education. Holder of a doctoral degree in Augmentative and Alternative Communication (AAC) from Manchester Metropolitan University, Kaul is credited with many books on the subject. She has served in many Government committees and held the chair of a government committee formulated to draft new laws for the disabled citizens of India.

The Government of India honored her in 2010, with the fourth highest civilian award of Padma Shri.
