= A. Zakia =

Indian journalist

A Zakia is a literati, a literary personality from the Siaha town of Mizoram, India, who was awarded the Padma Sri, the fourth highest civilian honour, by the Indian government in March 2018 for the preservation of the Mara language and cultural ethos through his exemplary contribution towards Mara journalism and literary creation.

== Early life ==
A Zakia was born in Lorrain Ville, in the Saikho village of Mizoram in 1930. He completed his schooling from the Government Middle School of the same village.

== Career ==
After completing his education in 1952, he joined the government school where he studied as a primary school teacher. He retired as a school teacher after 44 years of service in 1996.

Apart from teaching in school, he worked as a news editor for various publications and magazines, and retained key editorial positions in various organisations. He has authored more than ten books in the Mara language, including Children’s Bible and Mara Grammar. The Board of Mara Literature approved the Mara Grammar book for common use and as a standard text in schools. Between 1993 and 1996, the Board of School Education of the Mara Autonomous District Council made A Zakia the official translator of primary school text books.

His contributions led to the upliftment of Mara literature, at a time when the Mara language was slowly losing its existence due to the influence of English language and other dialects of the nearby tribes. According to ISL International, there are only 50,000 Mara speaking population remaining, and thus, it has been classified as an endangered language.

In 2018, the President of India, Ram Nath Kovind, conferred upon A Zakia the Padma Sri award for his contribution towards the upliftment and preservation of the endangered Mara language. He became the first person among the Mara tribe to receive the award.
