= Lakshmikutty =

Traditional medicine practitioner

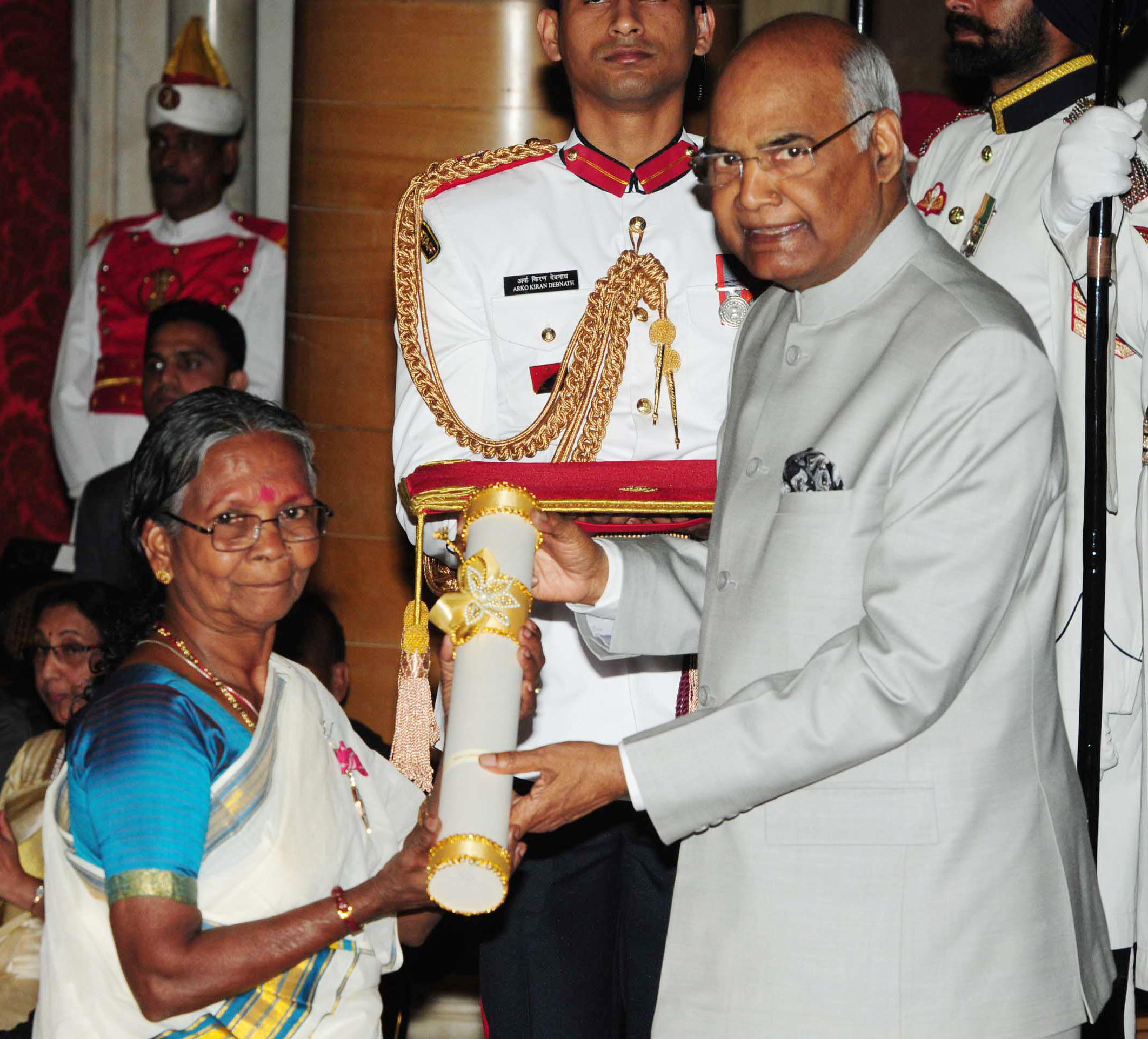
- The President, Shri Ram Nath Kovind presenting the Padma Shri Award to Smt. Lekshmikutty, at the Civil Investiture Ceremony, at Rashtrapati Bhavan, in New Delhi on March 20, 2018.
- Born: 1943 (age 82–83); Kallar, Thiruvananthapuram, Kerala, India
- Citizenship: Indian
- Awards: Padma Shri 2018

Lakshmikutty (born 1943) is a tribal woman from Kallar forest area at Vithura in Kerala, India who received the India's fourth highest civilian honour Padma Shri for her breakthrough in practicing traditional medicine.

== Early life ==
Lakshmikutty is a famous poison healer practicing traditional medicine. She also received the Kerala Government's Naattu Vaidya Ratna award in 1995. She has been practicing traditional medicine for over 50 years.

She belongs to the Kaani tribe and can remember more than 500 varieties of medicine. She has attained the education of the 3rd forum and knows Sanskrit. She also writes poems, and dramas and is a teacher in Kerala Folklore Academy.

Prime Minister Narendra Modi spoke about Lakshmikutty's contributions in his monthly Mann Ki Baat radio programme. People fondly refer to her as ‘Vanamuthassi’ (Grandmother of the jungle in Malayalam) and she gives lectures on natural medicine at various institutions across the southern states.
