= J. Malsawma =

Indian writer, scholar

- Born: Aizawl, Mizoram, India
- Awards: Padma Shri; Mizo Academy Award; Mizo Writers Certificate of Appreciation
- Website: Official web site

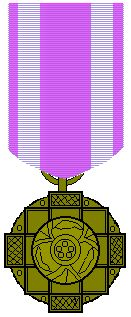
Padma Shri India

J. Malsawma, is a Mizo writer and scholar from North East Indian state of Mizoram, India. The Government of India honoured him, in 2013, by awarding him the Padma Shri, the fourth highest civilian award, for his contributions to the fields of literature.

== Publications ==
J. Malsawma hails is a known writer in mizo language and is credited with several books on mizo culture and poetry.

- His book, Vanglai is a mixed content publication with essays on mizo religion and culture and biographies of a selected number of mizo personalities.
- J Malsawma (2003). Zozia - Ethics and Moral Principles of Mizo People. Concept Publishing Company. ISBN 9788180693007.
- J Malsawma (1995). Vanglai - Prime Days. Concept Publishing Company. ISBN 9788180693007.
- J Malsawma (1969). Notes on Mizo Poems. Concept Publishing Company. ISBN 9788180693007.
- J Malsawma (1963). Zonun - Collection of Essays on Mizo Culture. Concept Publishing Company. ISBN 9788180693007.
- J Malsawma (1962). Mizo Poems - Old and New. Concept Publishing Company. ISBN 9788180693007.
- J. Malsawma (1960). "Kan Mizia".

== Awards ==
- Malsawma is a recipient of the Academy Award from the Mizo Academy of Letters, which he received in 2001.
- In 2013, he was honoured by the Government of India with the civilian award of Padma Shri.
- He has also received the Certificate of Appreciation from the Mizo Writers Association three times

Malsawma is a member of the Mizo Publication Board and the State Advisory Board on Tribal Art, Culture, Language, and the Indian national Trust for Arts and Cultural Heritage. he was the founder secretary of the Mizo Academy of Letters during 1964-65 and was its advisor later.

== See also ==
- Mizo language
