= Krishna Ram Chaudhary =

Indian shehnai player

- Born: Benaras
- Occupation: Indian musician
- Awards: Padma Shri in 2017

Pt. Krishna Ram Choudhary was an Indian musician. In 2017, he was awarded Padma Shri by the Indian Government for his contribution in music.

== Early life ==
Chaudhary was born on January 1, 1942, in Varanasi (Benaras.), Uttar Pradesh. He was the son of Late Shri Gopal (Buddha Lal Choudhary) and Late Smt. Bhagyawanti Devi. The musical environment of his family deeply influenced his upbringing and nurtured his passion for Indian classical music.

== Career ==
At age 16, Chaudhary topped the All India Radio (AIR) competition in Shehnai and was awarded a gold medal. He was awarded the President's Award in the All India Radio music competition in 1961.In 1982, he got the Critics’ Circle of India Award.

== Awards ==
- Padma Shri in 2017
- Sangeet Natak Akademi Award in 2008
- Uttar Pradesh Sangeet Natak Akademi Award (1991)
- Sensational Shehnai Player Award (1982) bestowed by Indian Social Lovers Organisation (ISCLO)
- CCI Award (1981): Recognition for outstanding contributions to India's cultural heritage
- Gold Medal (1978): Awarded by Bihar Sangeet Conference, Patna
- Surmani Award (1976): Conferred by Sur Singar Samsad
- Special President's Award (1961): Presented by Dr. Sarvepalli Radhakrishnan, Honorable President of India

== Death ==
Pt. Chaudhary died in 2019 at the age of 83 and was suffering from gastroenterological disease.
