= Suhas Vitthal Mapuskar =

Indian social activist (1935–2015)

Suhas Vitthal Mapuskar (22 January 1935 – October 2015) was an Indian physician and social activist who was awarded the Padma Shri, the fourth highest civilian award in India posthumously in 2017. He had received the Nirmal Gram Award from late President Dr. APJ Abdul Kalam in 2006. He dedicated his life to make Dehu village open defecation free beginning as early as in the 1960s. He is known for his work in the field of rural sanitation in Maharashtra.
