= Pawan Raj Goyal =

Indian pulmonologist (born 1952)

- Born: 19 February 1952 (age 74); Ahmedabad, India
- Occupation: Former Physician to The President Of India (Hon. 2012-2017)
- Spouse: Dr. Sunena Goyal
- Children: Dr. Shivanshu Raj Goyal and Mr. Ashvin Raj Goyal
- Parent(s): Mr. and Mrs. M. P. Goyal
- Awards: Padma Shri
- Website: Official web site

Pawan Raj Goyal is an Indian pulmonologist who gained his postgraduate degree from Harvard Medical School, Boston. The Government of India honoured him, in 2014, with the award of Padma Shri, the fourth highest civilian award, for his contributions to the fields of medicine.

== Biography ==
Pawan Raj Goyal, hailing from Haryana, graduated in medicine from Maulana Azad Medical College, New Delhi, in 1974 and did his residency at the Irwin Hospital, New Delhi. He has worked in various hospitals and institutions, including SRM Medical College Hospital and Research Centre, Chennai, as the professor and the head of the Department of chest and pulmonary medicine, where he holds the status of professor emeritus.

Besides being the chairman and managing director of PRG Medicares and Researches Limited, he also heads Osho Ceramics, a commercial entity manufacturing tableware, since 1990. He is a recipient of Udyog Gaurav and Samaj Shri awards.
