= Ayekpam Tomba Meetei =

Indian social worker

- Born: Tera Keithel, Imphal, Manipur, India
- Occupation: Social worker
- Awards: Padma Shri; National Award on Child Welfare (1991); Best Volunteer Award (2003)
- Website: Official web site

Ayekpam Tomba Meetei is an Indian social worker, works for the welfare of orphans and economically poor people of Manipur. He has also contributed towards the revival of the Meetei Mayek script. The Government of India honored him in 2010, with the fourth highest civilian award of Padma Shri.
