= Kisan Chachi =

Indian farmer

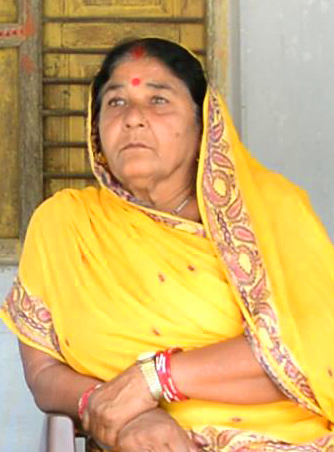
- Born: Rajkumari Devi; Muzaffarpur, Bihar, India
- Education: Matric
- Occupations: Farmer, agriculturist
- Known for: Farming
- Awards: Padma Shri, Kisan Shri

Rajkumari Devi better known as Kisan Chachi is an Indian farmer from Muzaffarpur, Bihar. She was awarded India's fourth highest civilian award, Padma Shri in 2019.

== Early life ==
Chachi was born in Muzaffarpur, Bihar in a financially weak family, due to family poverty she got married at an early age. After her marriage, she formed self-help groups and with the help of biological farming, she provided work for many poor families. Bihar CM Nitish Kumar recognized her and awarded her with Kisan Shri.

Chachi is from Anandpur village located in the Saraiya block of Muzaffarpur district in the state of Bihar.
