= Dahyabhai Shastri =

Indian scholar

- Born: Vasai Dabhla, Mehsana district, Gujarat, India
- Occupations: Scholar; Educationist
- Known for: Sanskrit studies
- Awards: Padma Shri; Gujarat State Award

Dahyabhai Shastri is an Indian scholar of Sanskrit and the founder of Brahmarshi Sanskrit Mahavidyalaya, Nadiad. He is also a former president of the Gujarat state unit of the Vishwa Hindu Parishad. Born in Vasai Dabhla, a small village in Mehsana district of Gujarat and did his studies in Sanskrit in Ahmedabad and Varanasi, Shastri chairs the Veda Centre, Pardi. He is known for contributions in interpreting Sanskrit grammar and literature and is a recipient of Gujarat State Award. The Government of India awarded him the fourth highest civilian honour of the Padma Shri, in 2016, for his contributions to Literature and education.

== See also ==
- Sanskrit grammar
