= Rajeshwar Acharya =

Classical vocalist from India

- Born: Varanasi, India
- Occupation: Classical music vocalist
- Known for: Hindustani classical music
- Awards: Padma Sri (2019)

Rajeshwar Acharya is a Hindustani classical vocalist from Varanasi, India. He served as head of the Department of Fine Arts and Music at Deen Dayal Upadhyay Gorakhpur University.

In 2019, he was conferred the Padma Shri honour by the President of India for his contribution to the field of arts.

== Life ==
Acharya was born in Varanasi, India. He studied music from Banaras Hindu University and practiced music under Pandit Balwantrai Bhatt. He belongs to the Gwalior gharana of music. His professional career was primarily based in Gorakhpur, where he joined Gorakhpur University as a lecturer in vocal music and later became head of the department. He retired from academic service in 2003 and subsequently resided in Varanasi.
