= Nitish Naik =

Indian cardiologist

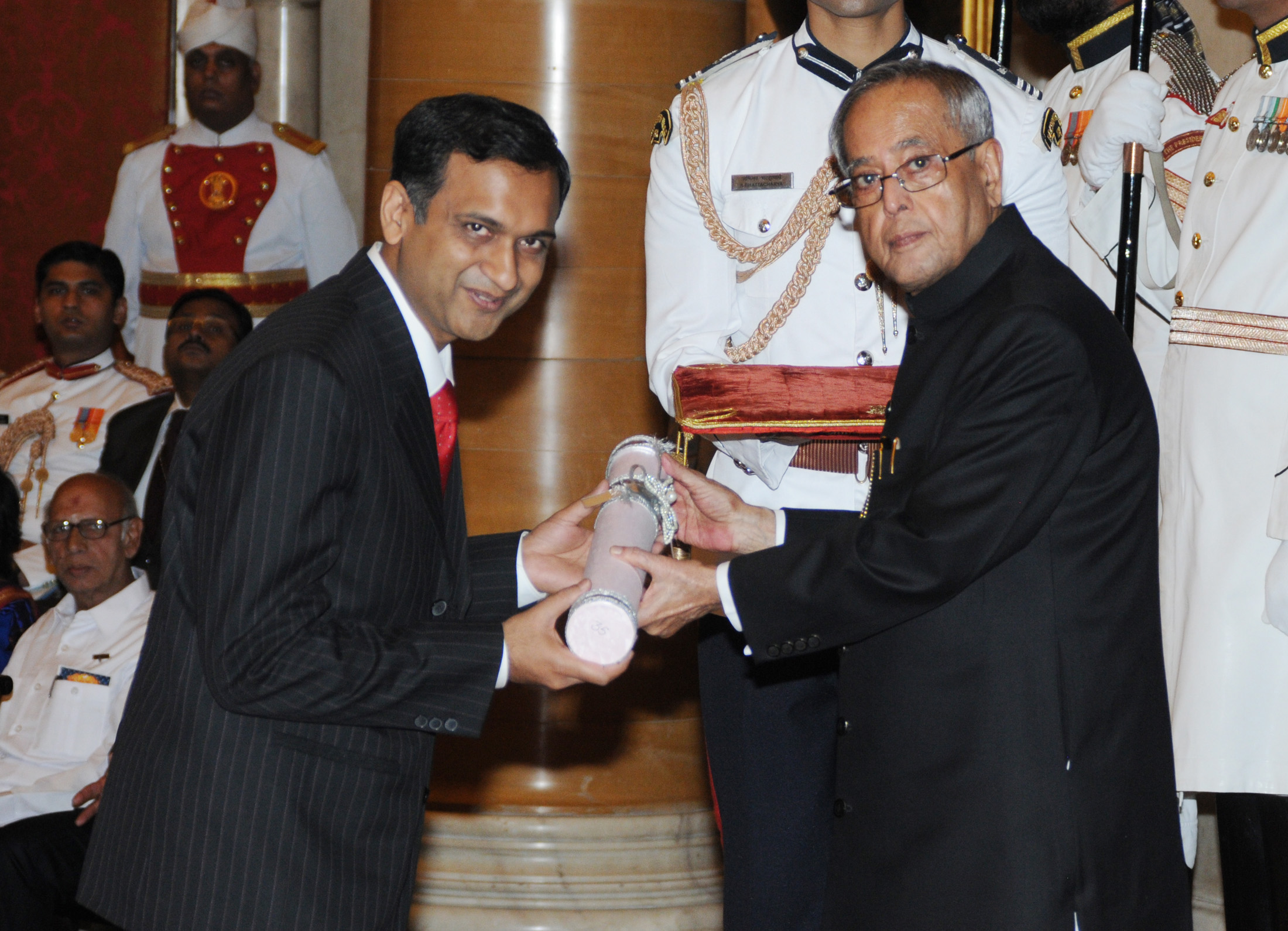
- Born: India
- Occupation: Indian cardiologist
- Awards: Padma Shri

Nitish Naik is an Indian cardiologist, known for his expertise in cardiovascular diseases, and is an additional professor at the All India Institute of Medical Sciences. He was honoured by the Government of India, in 2014, by bestowing on him the Padma Shri, the fourth highest civilian award, for his contributions to the field of medicine. He is reported to have treated Manmohan Singh, Sonia Gandhi
