= Rajni Kant (social worker) =

Indian indigenous crafts campaigner

- Born: 5 August 1960; Jalalpur Mafi village, Uttar Pradesh, India
- Occupation: Social Worker
- Known for: Preservation of traditional Indian products through GI tags
- Awards: Padma Shri (2019)

Rajni Kant is an Indian campaigner for indigenous crafts. He works to secure Geographical indication (GI) tags and intellectual property rights for traditional products and handicrafts in India. Known as the "GI man of India", he was awarded the Padma Shri, India's fourth highest civilian award, for his work in 2019. As of February 2025, he has facilitated 155 products from 21 states and union territories of India in receiving GI certifications.

== Early life and education ==
Rajni Kant was born on 5 August 1960 in Jalalpur Mafi village in Uttar Pradesh. He has a PhD in soil and agricultural chemistry.

== Career ==
He entered the field of social welfare after seeing skilled craftspeople face increasing economic hardship as foreign brands gained prominence in post-liberalization India.

In 1991, he founded the Varanasi based Human Welfare Association (HWA), with a focus on women's empowerment and skill development. He has created e model for securing GI tags, which has been replicated across India. His contributions and expertise have been recognised by India's central as well as multiple state governments, who approach him to secure GI tags for local handicrafts and traditional products. He is playing a role in the Government of India's effort to secure 10,000 GI tags by 2030. He also trains individuals from various parts of the country on how to build a case for a GI tag.

== Awards ==
- Samay Udyami award, 2012 as the best social entrepreneur.
- National Intellectual Property award, 2017
- Lokmat Samman, 2018
- Padma Shree, 2019
- Honoris Causa award of Doctor of Literature by the Arunachal University, 2025
