= Bertha Gyndykes Dkhar =

Indian educationist

- Born: Shillong, Meghalaya, India
- Occupation: Educationist
- Awards: Padma Shri; National Award for Child Welfare
- Website: Official web site

Bertha Gyndykes Dkhar is a visually impaired Indian educationist, best known as the inventor of the braille code in Khasi. In 2010, the Government of India awarded her with the Padma Shri, India's fourth highest civilian award.

== Early life ==
Bertha Gyndykes Dkhar was born in Shillong, Meghalaya as a visually-impaired child with retinitis pigmentosa, a disease which causes degeneration of the retina, and lost the eyesight completely while she was in college due to which she had to abandon her studies. Without means to support herself, she sold fruits in the market for a living. Continuing with efforts to overcome the disability, Dkhar researched in Braille code and designed the code in Khasi, the local language in Meghalaya.

== Work and recognition ==
Bertha Dkhar is the headmistress of the Jyoti Sroat School, a school run by the Bethany Society for the visually impaired children. She received the fourth highest Indian civilian award of Padma Shri, when she featured in the 2010 Indian Republic Day honours list. She is also a recipient of the national award for Child Welfare from the Government of India in 2000.

== See also ==
- Braille code
