= Gul Bardhan =

Indian choreographer

- Born: 1928
- Died: 29 November 2010 (aged 81–82)
- Occupation: Choreographer
- Awards: Padma Shri (2010)

Gul Bardhan (1928 – 29 November 2010) was a choreographer and theatre personality based in Bhopal, Madhya Pradesh, India. She was associated with the Indian People's Theatre Association. She was the co-founder of the Little Ballet Troupe. a dance and puppet company formed in Bombay in 1952, and headed by Shanti Bardhan, her husband. After the death of her husband in 1954, Gul Bardhan headed the troupe. The troupe was later renamed "Ranga Shri Little Ballet Troupe" and performed in different countries. She received several awards, including the Sangeet Natak Academy award and the Padma Shri (the fourth highest civilian award of India) in 2010.
