= J. L. Kaul =

Indian social worker

- Born: 28 July 1942 (age 84); Kashmir, Jammu and Kashmir, India
- Other name: Jawahar Lal Kaul
- Occupation: Indian social worker
- Awards: Padma Shri; Louis Braille Medal; Marga Schulze Award; FICCI National Award; Thomas Memorial National Award; World Human Rights Promotion Award; T. P. Jhunjhunwala Award; NCPEDP – Shell Helen Keller Award; R. M. Alpaiwala Memorial Award
- Website: All India Conference of the Blind

Jawahar Lal Kaul is an Indian social worker and the founder of the All India Conference of the Blind, an NGO working towards the rehabilitation of the blind. He was honoured by the Government of India, in 2014, which bestowed on him the Padma Shri, the fourth highest civilian award, for his services to the field of Social Work.

== Early life and education ==
"The biggest challenge for visually impaired students is availability of textbooks in Braille."
– J. L. Kaul, about the state of affairs on the opportunities for blind people

Jawahar Lal Kaul was born as a sighted child on 28 July 1942, in Sri Nagar, in the Himalayan state of Jammu and Kashmir, India. He lost his eyesight following a smallpox attack at the age of five. However, he studied at a local school and graduated in Sanskrit, with gold medal from the Punjab University, in 1967, standing first in the BA examination.

== Work ==
In the mid-sixties, Kaul moved to Delhi with a view to do something for the rehabilitation of blind people. In Delhi, he set up the Training and Rehabilitation Centre for the Blind in 1967, and served as its secretary. With the organization to support, he played an active role is the establishment of the National Federation of the Blind, reported to be the first national level self-help organization for the blind in India, and was its founding secretary. He continued in the post until 1978 when he turned his attention to the setting up of an organization on a larger scale.

In 1980, Kaul founded the All India Confederation of the Blind (AICB), an NGO operating out of a small rented office with a capital of ₹ 300. The organization, over the years, has grown into a nationwide institution, with own campus and branches across the country, becoming the largest braille production centre in the country. AICB caters to the braille requirement of 10 states in India, with regard to their college and school textbooks. The organization also runs a science laboratory and a resource centre, providing opportunities to visually impaired people to have facilities on a par with sighted students.

AICB, under the guidance of Kaul, operates a modern school in Gurgaon for blind children. Its activities include:

- An audio library
- Hostel for blind girls
- Rural rehabilitation programmes in Rajasthan, Uttar Pradesh and Madhya Pradesh
- Interest-free loans to blind persons for self-employment ventures
- Pensions for elderly blind people
- Braille equipment banking
- Publication of braille journals

In order to generate employment for the visually impaired, Kaul has set up stenography and IT training centres under the aegis of AICB. The organization also conducts regular eye camps for the prevention of blindness. They also partner with other organizations on projects such as providing braille books for students, and have set up a corpus to provide scholarships for blind students.

Kaul was the executive secretary of the East Asia Committee of the International Federation of the Blind from 1977 to 1985. He served as the Secretary General of the World Blind Union for two terms, from 2000 to 2012. He was the Chairman of the Credential Committee of the Asian Blind Union and a member of the Credential Committee of the World Blind Union. He also served as the Chairperson of the World Braille Council from 2009 to 2012, of which he is an honorary life member.

== Awards and recognitions ==
Kaul was honoured by the Government of India awarding him the Padma Shri in 2014, in recognition of his efforts for society. He was a recipient of the Louis Braille Medal in 2012, the highest honour awarded by the World Blind Union. Kaul was the first recipient of the award from a developing country.

- Marga Schulze Award – Dr. H. E. Schulze and Marga Schulze Foundation – 2006
- FICCI National Award for best service to the blind in training and rehabilitation – FICCI
- Thomas Memorial National Award – All India Blind Welfare Trust, Chennai – 2000
- World Human Rights Promotion Award – Indian Institute of Human Rights – 2002
- T. P. Jhunjhunwala Award – Rajasthan Club – 2003
- NCPEDP – Shell Helen Keller Award – 2003 – National Centre for Promotion of Employment for Disabled People
- R. M. Alpaiwala Memorial Award – National Association for the Blind, Mumbai
