= Mukul Chandra Goswami =

Indian social worker

- Born: Assam, India
- Occupation: Social worker
- Awards: Padma Shri
- Website: Official web site

Mukul Chandra Goswami is an Indian social worker and the founder of Ashadeep, a non governmental organization which runs homes for people with mental illnesses and works for the rehabilitation of the elderly and mental patients. Goswami, quitting his job as a banker, founded the organization in 1996 with activities based at his home in a modest manner but, over the years, the initiative has grown to include Roshmi, a home for mentally ill people, Navchetna, a project for the rehabilitation of the mental patients, Prashantiloy, a daycare centre for the elderly and an outdoor clinic. He was honored by the Government of India, in 2014, with the fourth highest Indian civilian award of Padma Shri.
