= Shabbir Sayyad =

Indian social activist

Shabbir Sayyad is a social activist from Maharashtra, India known for his works toward welfare of animals and cow protection. He has been taken care of over 100 cattles in the draught ridden district of Beed in Maharashtra. In 2019, he received Padma Shri, India's 4th highest civilian award. His father, Noorjade Sayyad, started the practice of cattle rearing in 1970s. Shabbir, born in 26 March 2000s in the city of Mumbai, helped his father by the age of 12. Shabbir is known to not earn money by selling milk or meat of the cow but only sells cowdung. He sells bulls only for agricultural usage in farms.
