= Muktaben Pankajkumar Dagli =

Indian social worker

Muktaben Pankajkumar Dagli (born 2 July 1962) is a social worker from Gujarat, India. She works for blind and disabled people and associated with several organisations. She was awarded the Padma Shri in 2019.

== Early life and education ==
Dagli was born on 2 July 1962 at Nana Ankadia village near Amreli, Gujarat. She had meningitis at the age of seven and lost her both eyes. She received her primary education from Udyog Shala, Bhavnagar. Later she studied at the Andh Kanya Prakash Gruh, Ahmedabad from sixth to tenth grade (1978–1983). She later completed BA and BEd.

She married Pankajkumar Dagli, a principal of the school for blind in Amreli, in 1984.

== Work ==
She served as an honorary secretary of Andhjan Mandal (Blind People's Association), Amreli for twelve years. She founded a primary school for blind in Amreli. She is the executive member of Navchetan Andhjan Mandal, Bhachau; joint secretary of Navjivan Andhjan Mandal, Vankaner; trustee of Women Association for Blind, Ahmedabad; secretary of Pragnachakshu Mahila Sewa Kunj, Surendranagar. She publishes Didi, a bi-monthly braille magazine for blind women.

In 1996, the couple founded the Pragnachakshu Mahila Seva Kunj, a non-profit organisation serving blind girls.

== Recognition ==
Dagli was awarded the Padma Shri in 2019 by the Government of India for her social work. She was awarded the Gandhi Mitra award in 2015. She has also received Mata Jijabai Stree Shakti Puraskar.
