= Vishwa Kumar Gupta =

Indian homoeopathic physician

- Born: Sialkot undivided India
- Occupation: Homoeopathic physician
- Spouse: Dr.Neelam Gupta
- Children: Dr.Shantanu Gupta, Dr.Shweta Gupta
- Parents: Om Prakash Gupta (father); Vidyawati gupta (mother)
- Awards: Padma Shri

Vishwa Kumar Gupta, is an Indian homoeopathic physician and former Principal of the Nehru Homoeopathic Medical College, New Delhi. The Government of India honoured him, in 2013, by awarding him the Padma Shri, the fourth highest civilian award, for his contributions to the field of medicine.

== Biography ==
Vishwa Kumar Gupta, son of Om Prakash Gupta, hails from Sialkot undivided India, and graduated (GHMS) in the alternative medicine system of homoeopathy from the city. His career was mainly at the Nehru Homoeopathic Medical College, New Delhi from where he retired as the Principal.

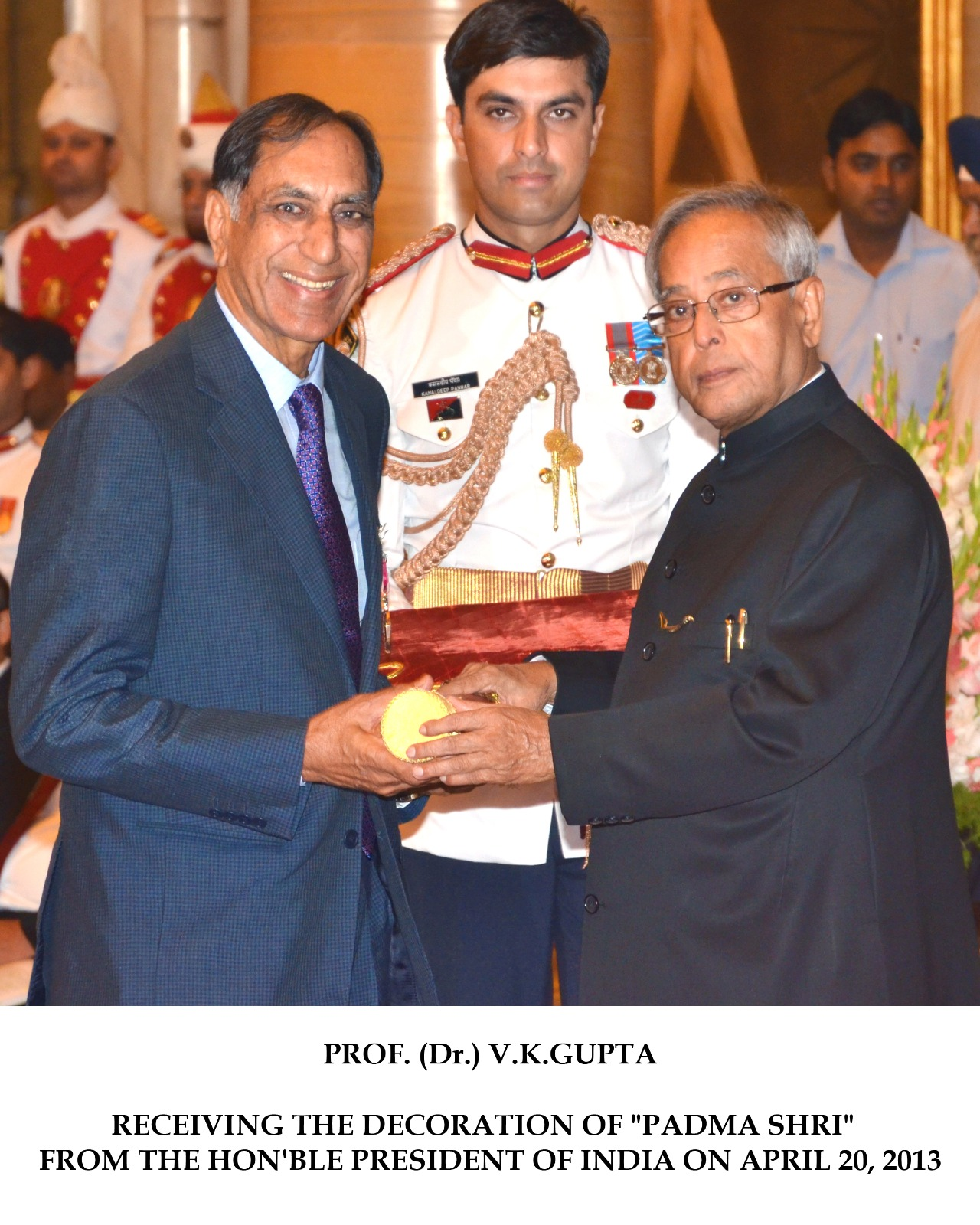
The President, Pranab Mukherjee, presenting the Padma Shri Award to Dr. V.K.Gupta, at an Investiture Ceremony, at Rashtrapati Bhavan, in New Delhi on 20th April 2013.

Gupta was the President of the Indian Institute of Homoeopathic Physicians, (IIHP) for two consecutive two year terms, from 1998 to 2002. He was a member of the Central Council of Homoeopathy from 1990 to 1995, has also served as a member of many committees of the Ministry of Health and Family Welfare, for the Government of India projects and was the honourable physician to the President of India.

Gupta has attended many national and international conferences where he has presented scientific papers. A recipient of the fourth highest Indian civilian award of Padma Shri, in 2013, Gupta lives at Rajouri Garden, in New Delhi.
