= Vallabhbhai Marvaniya =

Indian farmer

Vallabhbhai Vasrambhai Marvaniya
- Born: Junagadh district, Gujarat, India
- Occupation: Farmer
- Known for: Introducing carrots in Gujarat; developing the Madhuban Gajar variety
- Children: Arvindbhai Marvaniya
- Awards: National Award, 2017; National Grassroots Innovation Awards, 2017; Padma Shri, 2019

Vallabhbhai Vasrambhai Marvaniya is an Indian farmer and innovator from Khamdhrol village in the Junagadh district of Gujarat. He is known for introducing carrots to Gujarat in the 1940s and for developing the highly nutritious carrot variety called Madhuban Gajar.

In 2019, Marvaniya was awarded the Padma Shri, India's fourth-highest civilian award, for his contribution to agriculture and grassroots innovation.

He also received a National Award from the President of India during the Festival of Innovation at Rashtrapati Bhavan in 2017 and was honored with the ninth National Grassroots Innovation Award for his agricultural innovations.

== Madhuban Gajar ==
The Madhuban Gajar is a biofortified carrot variety developed by Marvaniya using selection methods. It has high β-carotene (277.75 mg/kg) and iron (276.7 mg/kg) content on a dry basis. The variety is used to produce value-added products like carrot chips, juice, and pickles. It yields an average of 40–50 tonnes per hectare and is cultivated in over 1,000 hectares across Gujarat, Maharashtra, Rajasthan, West Bengal, and Uttar Pradesh.

Validation trials conducted by the National Innovation Foundation (NIF), an autonomous body under the Department of Science and Technology (India), showed that Madhuban Gajar outperformed standard check varieties in root yield and plant biomass.

The variety is cultivated by over 150 local farmers in Junagadh and has become a major source of income for them. Seed production and marketing are managed by his son, Arvindbhai Marvaniya, with about 100 quintals sold annually through 30 local seed suppliers.

== Legacy ==
Marvaniya began developing this carrot variety in 1943 after noticing that a local fodder carrot variety improved milk quality. He started cultivating and marketing it commercially in the 1950s. By the 1970s, he was distributing seeds to neighboring farmers and began large-scale sales in 1985.
