= Ghulam Mohammed Mir =

- Other name: Muma kana
- Known for: Public service
- Awards: Padma Shri in 2010

Ghulam Mohammed Mir was a former Indian militant. In 2010 he received the Padma Shri award, the fourth highest civilian award in the Republic of India for his public service works. As of 2010, Mir runs a bandsaw business in his native Magam in central Kashmir's Budgam district. He is there also known by his nickname Muma Kana.
