= Rafael Iruzubieta Fernandez =

Spanish academic, lawyer and Indologist

Rafael Iruzubieta Fernández
- Born: January 13, 1940 (age 86); Madrid, Spain
- Occupations: Academic, lawyer, indologist
- Awards: Padma Shri

Rafael Iruzubieta Fernández (born January 13, 1940) is a Spanish academic, lawyer and Indologist. In 2010, the Government of India awarded him with the Padma Shri, India's fourth highest civilian award.

== Biography ==
Rafael Iruzubieta Fernández was born on 13 January 1940 in the Spanish capital of Madrid. He secured his doctoral degree in law from the Complutense University of Madrid and joined the university as a faculty member. He also taught at the University of Málaga.

Iruzubieta met Professor Vasant Gadre, a professor of Spanish language, at the Jawaharlal Nehru University, Delhi, in 1969 and developed a fascination for Indology. He has since founded the Institute of Indology, a nonprofit organization for cultural exchanges between Spain and India. The institute conducts bi-annual courses on India studies at the Complutense University of Madrid. He has also instituted two student awards at JNU, Rafael Iruzubieta Award and Irene Peláez de Iruzubieta Award, for excellence in Spanish studies.

Rafael Iruzubieta has published many books, two of the notables ones are:

- Rafael Iruzubieta Fernández (2013). La Constitución de la India : presentación y coordinación de Rafael Iruzubieta Fernández. Editorial Universitaria Ramon Areces. p. 684. ISBN 9788499611198.
- Rafael Iruzubieta Fernández (1989). El abuso del derecho y el fraude de ley en el derecho del trabajo (Spanish ed.). Colex. p. 319. ISBN 978-8486123833.
