= Omesh Kumar Bharti =

Indian field epidemiologist

Omesh Kumar Bharti is a field epidemiologist from Shimla, Himachal Pradesh, India. In 2019, Bharti received the Padma Shri civilian honour for the pioneering work in finding an affordable cure for rabid dog bite.

== Education ==
In 1992, Bharti completed MBBS from Shimla. In 2009, he received master's degree in Applied Epidemiology (MAE) from National Institute of Epidemiology (NIE), Chennai, affiliated to Indian Council of Medical Research (ICMR). He also did Hospital Management Course from NIHFW, Delhi and South Asia Course on Equity and Health by International People's Health University.

== Career ==
Bharti is the Programme Officer and Epidemiologist working at State Institute of Health and Family Welfare, Kasumpti Shimla

== Social work ==
Simultaneous to his medical practice, Bharti joined NGOs in Shimla and came across the harsh reality of rabies. Even with access to hospitals and other treatment options, the cost of rabid dog bite treatment was a hindrance. In 1995, he began a self-funded research for an alternate and affordable treatment for rabid dog bite. He innovated a technique of injecting the serum into the wound, enabling the use of one vial to treat up to 20 patients successfully. The World Health Organization reviewed the technique and approved it as a low cost anti-rabies treatment protocol in 2018. The research was done at the Deen Dayal Upadhyay Hospital (Shimla) and the National Institute of Mental Health and Neurosciences (Bengaluru), and took 17 years to be accomplished.
