= Mohammad Sharaf-e-Alam =

Indian writer and scholar

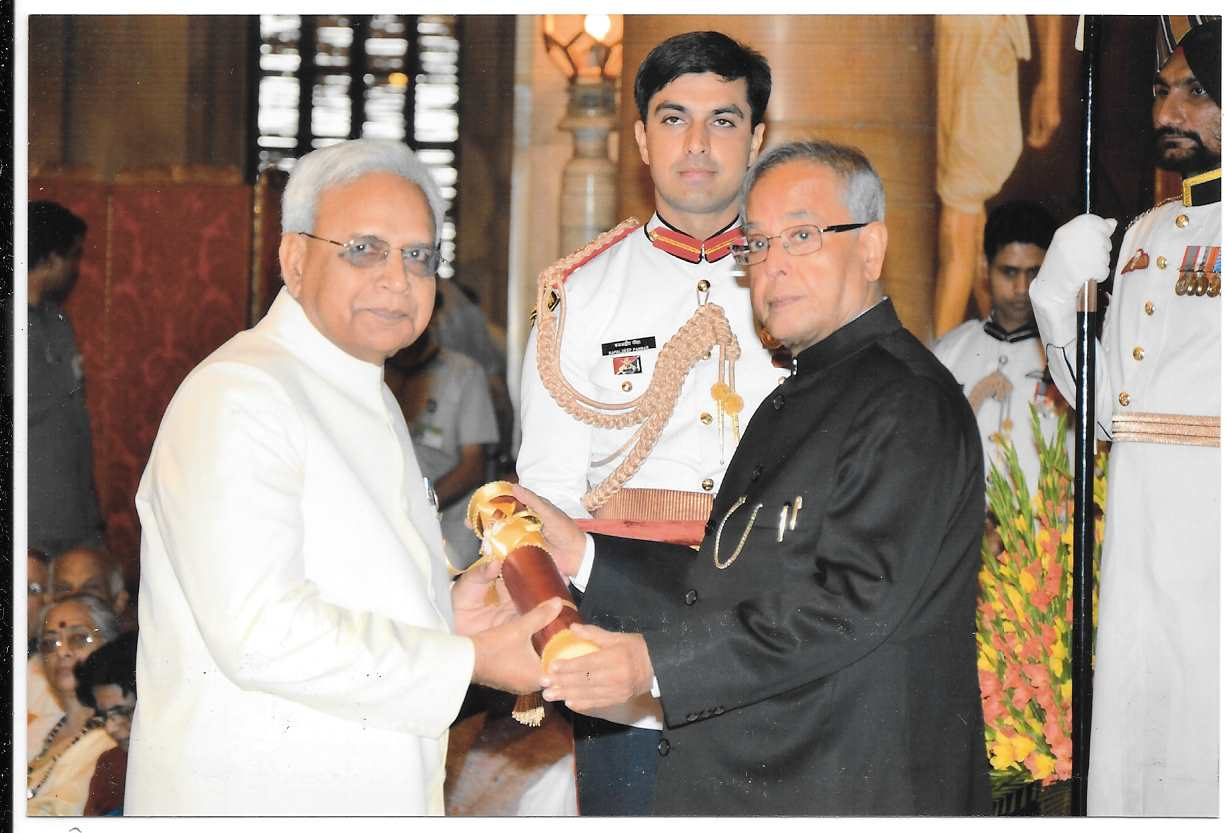
- President Pranab Mukherjee presents Padma Shri to Mohammad Sharfe Alam at Padma Awards 2013 at the Rashtrapati Bhavan in New Delhi
- Born: Bihar, India
- Occupations: Writer, educationist
- Awards: Padma Shri; GOI Certificate of Honour
- Website: Official web site

Mohammad Sharaf-e-Alam is an Indian writer, educationist, scholar of Persian language and the first vice chancellor of Maulana Mazharul Haque Arabic and Persian University. He served at the university from 2004 till 2007 and has worked at B. N. College as the head of the department of Persian Language. He is also credited with several publications. Alam, a recipient of the Certificate of Honour from the Government of India, was honored again by the Government, in 2013, with the fourth highest Indian civilian award of Padma Shri.

== See also ==
- Maulana Mazharul Haque University
