= Kiritkumar Mansukhlal Acharya =

Indian dermatologist

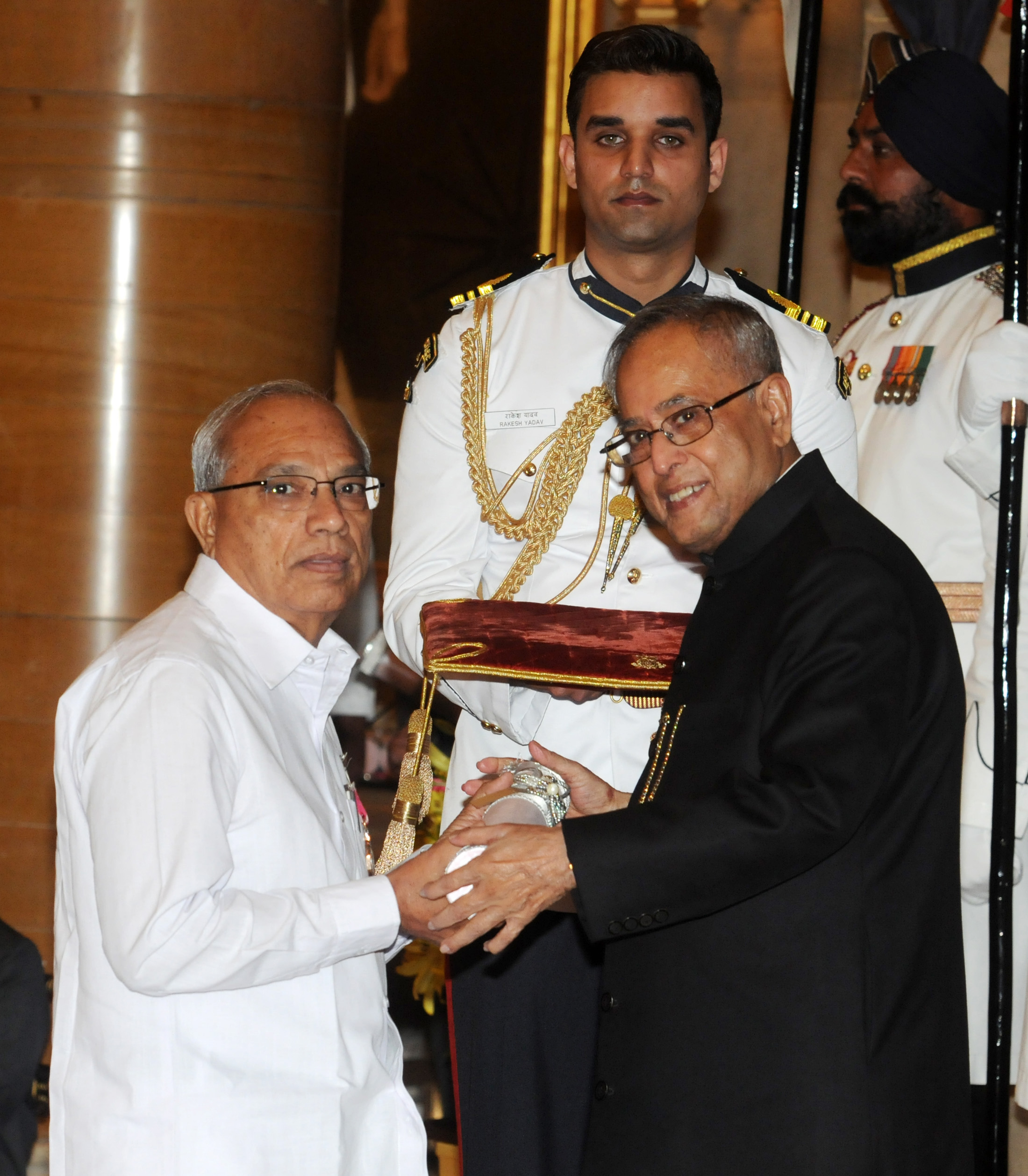
- Acharya receiving the Padma Shri Award at the Civil Investigation Ceremony
- Born: Saurashtra, Gujarat, India
- Occupation: Dematologist
- Medical career
- Awards: Padma Shri
- Website: Official web site

Kiritkumar Mansukhlal Acharya is an Indian dermatologist, known for his services for the eradication of leprosy. The Government of India honoured him, in 2014, by awarding him the Padma Shri, the fourth highest civilian award, for his contributions to the fields of medicine and social service.

== Biography ==
Kiritkumar Mansukhlal Acharya, more known by his popular name, K. M. Acharya, was born in Saurashtra, in the Western Indian state of Gujarat. His medical career was mainly at the M. P. Shah Medical College, Jamnagar as the Professor and the Head of the Department of skin, sexually transmitted diseases (STD) and leprosy. After his retirement from the service, he runs the Mahatma Gandhi Leprosy Society.
