= Habibullo Rajabov =

Tajikistain indologist

- Born: Tajikistan
- Occupation: Indologist
- Awards: Padma Sri (2018)

Habibullo Rajabov is an Indologist from Tajikistan. In 2018, he was conferred the Padma Sri by the President of India for his contribution to the fields of education and literature. He is the first Tajik national to receive the award.
