= Bounlap Keokangna =

Heritage conservationist architect from Laos

Bounlap Keonkangna
- Born: Laos
- Occupation: Architect
- Awards: Padma Sri (2018)

Bounlap Keokangna is a heritage conservationist architect from Laos. On 9 March 2018, Keokangna was conferred the Padma Sri for his contribution in the field of architecture by the President of India, Ram Nath Kovind.
