= P.S. Hardia =

Indian ophthalmologist

Pratap Singh Hardia is an Indian ophthalmologist from Indore, Madhya Pradesh, known for his surgical work and contributions to affordable eye care. He holds a Guinness World Record for performing the highest number of eye surgeries by a single surgeon and was awarded the Padma Shri by the Government of India in 2019 for his contribution to medicine.

== Career ==
According to Guinness World Records between 1966 and 1999 Hardia performed 515,842 eye operations, earning him the world record for the most eye surgeries performed by an individual surgeon. An India Today feature also reported his entry into the Guinness Book of Records for conducting over 500,000 eye surgeries over a span of 33 years.

He has developed innovative surgical techniques, including posterior scleral support for controlling myopia progression in children and has practiced radial keratotomy since 1973. His work has been presented at a joint meeting of the American Academy of Ophthalmology (AAO) and the Asia Pacific Academy of Ophthalmology (APAO) in 2006.

== Advocacy and outreach ==
Hardia has promoted awareness about preventable blindness, emphasizing that up to 75% of eye diseases can be prevented through early diagnosis and treatment. He has conducted free eye camps and community screening programmes, offering low-cost or free treatment for underprivileged patients in Madhya Pradesh.

== Awards and recognition ==
- Guinness World Record (2000) – for performing 515,842 eye operations between 1966–1999.
- Padma Shri (2019) – conferred by the Government of India for contributions to medicine.
- Leading Health Professionals of the World (2006) – awarded by the International Biographical Centre, Cambridge, UK.
