= Brahmdev Sharma =

Indian educationist

- Born: Aligarh India
- Occupation: Educationist
- Awards: Padma Shri

Brahmdev Sharma, popularly known as Bhaijji, is an Indian educationist and the patron of Vidya Bhararti Akhil Bhartiya Shiksha Sansthan, the largest non governmental organization in the field of education in India. He is also a patron the Shiksha Bharati, a non profit making organization working in the educational sector. The Government of India honoured him in 2015, with the award of Padma Shri, the fourth highest Indian civilian award for his contributions to the area of education.
