= Sudam Kate =

Indian social activist doctor

Dr. Sudam Kate is an Indian social activist doctor known for his pioneering work in the field of Sickle-Cell Anaemia in India. Working with Maharashtra Arogya Mandal, Hadapsar, Pune; he helped diagnose and later treated over 3000 sickle cell patients from the rural tribal communities of Maharashtra, Gujarat and Madhya Pradesh, working since 1972. In 2017, the US-based NGO Sickle Cell 101 presented him with “2017 Sickle Cell Advocate of the Year”. He was presented with Padma Shri, India's 4th highest civilian award in 2019.
