= Kailash Madbaiya =

Indian writer from Bundelkhand

- Born: October 2, 1943 (age 83); Uttar Pradesh, India
- Occupations: Writer; poet; educator
- Known for: Contributions to Bundeli literature and folk culture
- Awards: Padma Shri (2019)

Kailash Madbaiya (pronounced [ˈkɛː.l̪ɑːʃ mə.ɽə.ˈbɛː.jɑː], Hindi: कैलाश मड़बैया) is an Indian writer, poet, and educator from Madhya Pradesh, noted for his contributions to Bundeli literature and the promotion of folk culture from the Bundelkhand region. He was awarded the Padma Shri, India's fourth-highest civilian honour, in 2019 for his work in the field of literature and education. He is also the president of Akhil Bhartiya Bundelkhand Sahitya and Sanskrit Parishad.

== Early life ==
Madbaiya was born in Banpur village of Lalitpur district in Uttar Pradesh, India.

== Career ==
Madbaiya has focused his literary and academic career on the Bundeli language, which is spoken in the Bundelkhand region spanning parts of Madhya Pradesh and Uttar Pradesh. His writings often explore and aim to preserve Bundeli folk traditions, social customs, and cultural identity. He has authored multiple books in Hindi and Bundeli.

In addition to his writing, Madbaiya has worked in education. He served as a first class government officer in Madhya Pradesh. His efforts include academic work on the language and initiatives to promote Bundeli literature more broadly, including while working outside of India.

== Awards ==
- Padma Shri (2019)
