= Bimola Kumari =

Indian physician

Sarungbam Bimola Kumari Devi
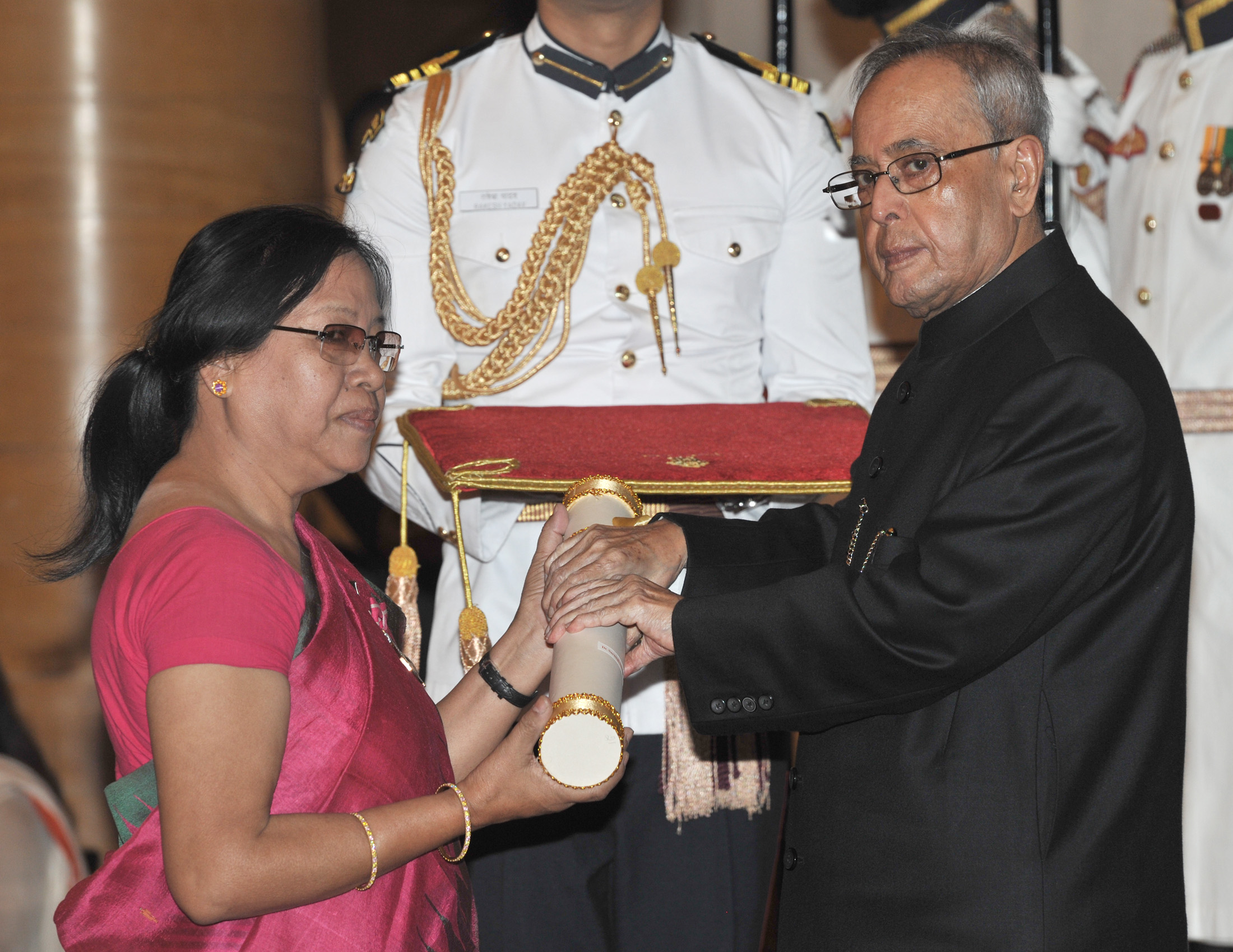
- Bimola Kumari (left) receiving Padma Shri Award from President Pranab Mukherjee
- Born: Manipur, India
- Occupation: Physician
- Years active: Since 1979
- Known for: Medical service in rural areas
- Awards: Padma Shri; Dr. B. R. Ambedkar International Award

Sarungbam Bimola Kumari Devi is an Indian medical doctor and the Chief Medical Officer of Imphal west region in the Indian state of Manipur. She has been serving in the Manipur state medical service since 1979, mostly working in the rural areas and has headed the food safety office during two visits of Narendra Modi, the Prime Minister of India, to the state. Kumari, a recipient of the 2014 Dr. B. R. Ambedkar International Award, was honoured by the Government of India in 2015 with the Padma Shri, the fourth highest Indian civilian award.
