= Amrta Suryananda Maha Raja =

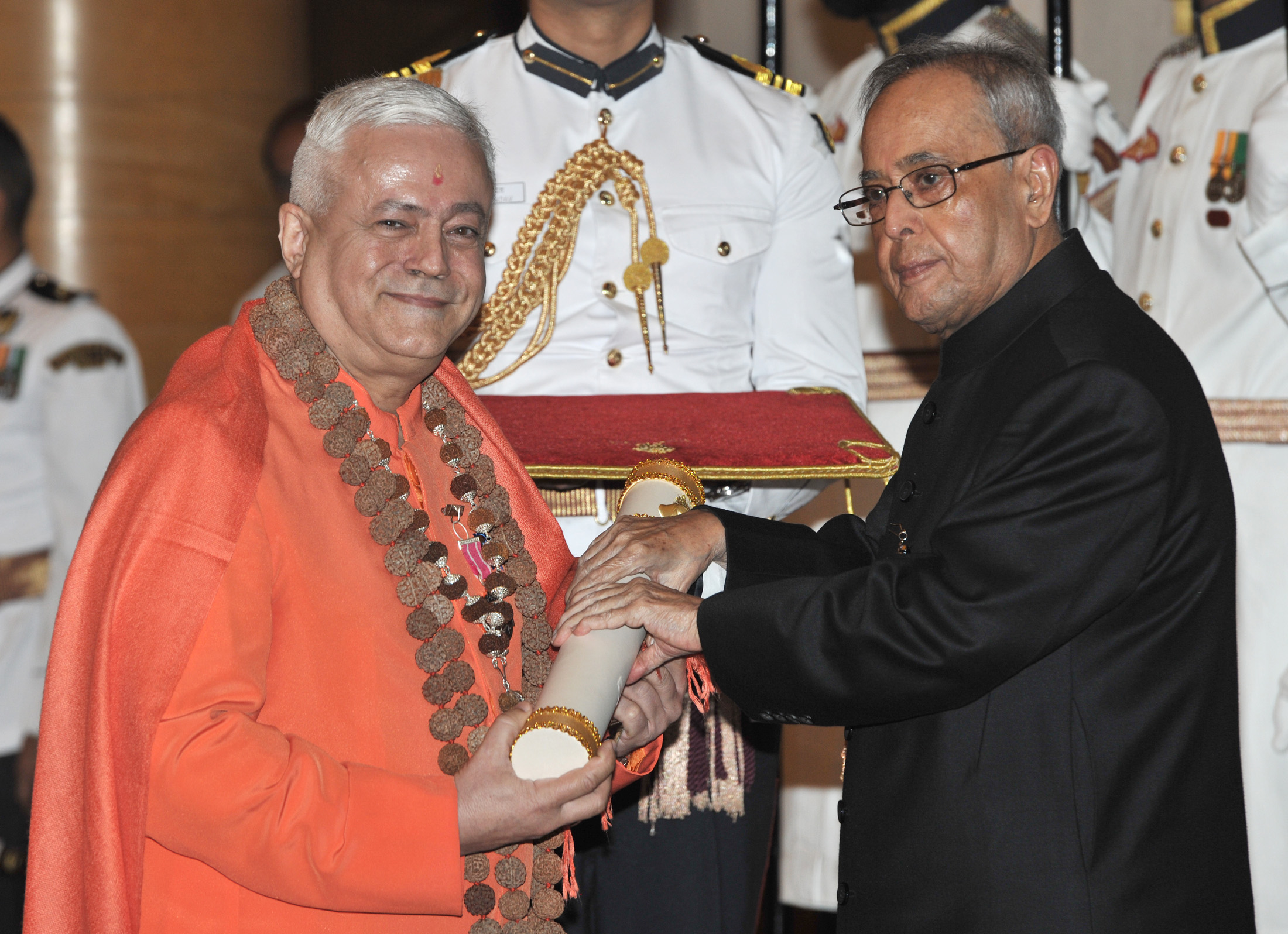
- The President, Shri Pranab Mukherjee presenting the Padma Shri Award to Jagat Guru Amrta Suryananda Maha Raja, at a Civil Investiture Ceremony, at Rashtrapati Bhavan, in New Delhi on April 08, 2015
- Born: 1952 (age 73–74); Portugal
- Occupation: Yoga guru
- Known for: Yoga
- Awards: Padma Shri

Amrta Suryananda Maha Raja is a Portugal-based Yoga guru, the president of the Yoga Portuguese Confederation and the founder of Yoga Sámkhya Institute, Portugal. Born in Portugal in 1952, he started learning the Indian tradition of Yoga in his twenties from Krshnánandaji of the Shivánanda Áshrama, located in Rishikesh in Himalayan valley. He is also known to have been influenced by Aurobindo, Vivekananda, Satyananda, Kuvalayananda and Ramakrishna Paramahamsa.

Amrta Suryananda is the author of two books on Yoga, Chakra Sútra – The 7 Main Chakra in Yoga and Sámkhya, Cosmo genesis and Yoga – Beyond Hydrogen. He is also reported to be writing an encyclopedia on yoga, and is in the process of translating Yoga Sutra of Patanjali into Portuguese language. The Government of India honoured him in 2015 with the award of Padma Shri, the fourth highest Indian civilian award.

== See also ==
- Patanjali
