= Maharao Raghuveer Singh =

Indian historian

Maharao Raghuveer Singh (born 1943) was awarded the Padma Sri civilian honour by the President of India, Ram Nath Kovind, for his contribution in the field of History. His primary contribution is in bringing out the fact that "India was at the fore of all scientific, social and philosophical fields" in the ancient times. He is from Sirohi, Rajasthan.

== Education ==
Raghuveer Singh studied History from Rajasthan University and is a gold medalist in the subject.
