= Coimbatore Narayana Rao Raghavendran =

Indian architect

- Born: Chennai, Tamil Nadu, India
- Occupation: Architect
- Parent: C. R. Narayana Rao
- Awards: Padma Shri

Coimbatore Narayana Rao Raghavendran is an Indian architect from Chennai, Tamil Nadu and the partner of C. R. Narayana Rao Architects and Engineers, a Chennai-based engineering concern. He graduated from the Indian Institute of Technology, Kharagpur and did higher studies at Cornell University in the United States. Working in Boston for brief period, Raghavendran returned to India to join his family business established by his father, C. R. Narayana Rao, in 1945. He was honored by the Government of India, in 2011, with the fourth highest Indian civilian award of Padma Shri.
