= List of Padma Shri award recipients in medicine =

Recipients of a civilian award in India

This is a list of recipients of the Padma Shri award, the fourth-highest civilian award of the Republic of India, in the field of Medicine. As of 2025, a total of 483 individuals have been awarded Padma Shri for their contributions to medicine.

== 1950–1959 ==
Year	Name	State	Field
1954	Satyanarayana Shastri	Uttar Pradesh	Medicine
1954	Bir Bhan Bhatia	Uttar Pradesh	Medicine
1954	Mathra Das Pahwa	Punjab	Medicine
1954	Vasant Ramji Khanolkar	Maharashtra	Medicine
1955	Lalit Mohan Banerjee	West Bengal	Medicine
1955	Vasant Ramji Khanolkar	Maharashtra	Medicine
1955	Mahesh Prasad Mehray	Uttar Pradesh	Medicine
1955	Perakath Verghese Benjamin	Kerala	Medicine
1955	Siddha Nath Kaul	Delhi	Medicine
1956	Muthulakshmi Reddi	Tamil Nadu	Medicine
1956	Chintaman Govind Pandit	Gujarat	Medicine
1956	Isaac Santra	West Bengal	Medicine
1956	Murugappa Chennaveerappa Modi	Karnataka	Medicine
1956	Mohan Lal	Uttar Pradesh	Medicine
1956	Sohan Singh	Punjab	Medicine
1957	Khushdeva Singh	Punjab	Medicine
1958	Rustom Jal Vakil	Maharashtra	Medicine
1959	Jal Cawasha Paymaster	Maharashtra	Medicine
1959	Shivajirao Patwardhan	Maharashtra	Medicine

== 1960-1969 ==
Year	Name	State	Field
1960	Rabindra Nath Chaudhuri	West Bengal	Medicine
1960	Vithal Nagesh Shirodkar	Maharashtra	Medicine
1960	Kalpathy Rama Iyer Doraiswami	Tamil Nadu	Medicine
1961	Rustomji Bomanji Billimoria	Maharashtra	Medicine
1961	Tridib Nath Banerjee	Bihar	Medicine
1961	Hilda Mary Lazarus	Andhra Pradesh	Medicine
1962	Col. Mahankali Seetharama Rao	Andhra Pradesh	Medicine
1962	Col. Ramaswamy Duraiswamy Ayyar	Delhi	Medicine
1962	Col. Sudhansu Sobhan Maitra	West Bengal	Medicine
1962	Dukhan Ram	Bihar	Medicine
1962	Jal R. Patel	Maharashtra	Medicine
1962	Prem Chandra Dhanda	Punjab	Medicine
1962	Raghunath Saran	Bihar	Medicine
1962	Santosh Kumar Sen	West Bengal	Medicine
1962	Santosh Kumar Mukerji	West Bengal	Medicine
1962	Shridher Sharma	Rajasthan	Medicine
1963	Arcot Lakshmanaswami Mudaliar	Tamil Nadu	Medicine
1963	M. L. Soni	Delhi	Medicine
1963	N. N. Bery	Punjab	Medicine
1963	Nani Chandra Bordoloi	Assam	Medicine
1963	Sohrabji Pestonji Shroff	Delhi	Medicine
1963	George William Gregory Bird	United Kingdom	Medicine
1964	Chintaman Govind Pandit	Maharashtra	Medicine
1964	Jacob Chandy	Kerala	Medicine
1964	Kushwant Lal Wig	Punjab	Medicine
1964	Rafiuddin Ahmed	West Bengal	Medicine
1964	Mohd. Abdul Hai	Bihar	Medicine
1964	Santosh Kumar Mazumdar	Delhi	Medicine
1965	Bhalchandra Babaji Dikshit	Maharashtra	Medicine
1965	Joges Chandra Banerjea	West Bengal	Medicine
1965	Pandit Shiv Sharma	Uttar Pradesh	Medicine
1965	Dwijendra Nath Mukerjee	West Bengal	Medicine
1965	Hakim Abdul Hameed	Delhi	Medicine
1966	Puliyur Krishnaswamy Duraiswami	Delhi	Medicine
1966	Jerusha Jhirad	Maharashtra	Medicine
1966	Ernest Joachim Joseph Borges	Maharashtra	Medicine
1966	Dr.Dharmendra	Delhi	Medicine
1966	Robert Brocklesby Davis	Bihar	Medicine
1967	Sivaramakrishna Padmavati	Delhi	Medicine
1967	Tulsi Das	Punjab	Medicine
1967	Cheruvari Kottieth Lakshmanan	Tamil Nadu	Medicine
1967	Amar Prasad Ray	Delhi	Medicine
1967	Natteri Veeraraghavan	Tamil Nadu	Medicine
1967	Edith Helen Paull	Maharashtra	Medicine
1968	Jyotish Chandra Ray	West Bengal	Medicine
1968	Mambillikalathil Govinda Kumar Menon	Delhi	Medicine
1968	Murugappa Channaveerappa Modi	Karnataka	Medicine
1969	Keshavrao Krishnarao Datey	Maharashtra	Medicine
1969	Prafulla Kumar Sen	Maharashtra	Medicine
1969	Vallabhadas Vithaldas Shah	Maharashtra	Medicine
1969	Bishen Lal Raina	Delhi	Medicine
1969	Bal Krishan Anand	Delhi	Medicine
1969	Krishna Gopal Saxena	Delhi	Medicine
1969	Nand Kishore Verma	Haryana	Medicine
1969	Ram Kumar Caroli	Uttar Pradesh	Medicine
1969	Kaviraj Ashutosh Majumdar	Uttar Pradesh	Medicine
1969	Vulimiri Ramalingaswami	Andhra Pradesh	Medicine

== 1970–1979 ==
Year	Name	State	Field
1970	Mahesh Prasad Mehray	Uttar Pradesh	Medicine
1970	Ajit Kumar Basu	West Bengal	Medicine
1970	Badri Narain Sinha	Uttar Pradesh	Medicine
1970	Colathur Gopalan	Delhi	Medicine
1970	Cuddalore Subramania Chetty Sadasivan	Andhra Pradesh	Medicine
1970	Perugu Siva Reddy	Telangana	Medicine
1970	Prem Prakash Sahni	Delhi	Medicine
1970	Rajendra Vir Singh	Uttar Pradesh	Medicine
1971	Vithalrao Nagesh Shirodkar	Maharashtra	Medicine
1971	Bishnupada Mukhopadhyaya	Bihar	Medicine
1971	Madan Mohan Singh	Delhi	Medicine
1971	Santosh Kumar Mukerji	Madhya Pradesh	Medicine
1971	Shantilal Jamnadas Mehta	Maharashtra	Medicine
1971	Vulimiri Ramalingaswami	Delhi	Medicine
1971	Basapapatna Narayana Blkrishna Rao	Delhi	Medicine
1971	Hari Mohan	Delhi	Medicine
1971	Krishnaswami Srinivasa Sanjivi	Tamil Nadu	Medicine
1971	Robin Banerjee	Assam	Medicine
1971	Sundaram Krishnamurti	Tamil Nadu	Medicine
1971	Chandi Prasad Misra	Delhi	Medicine
1972	Baldev Singh	Delhi	Medicine
1972	Bhalchandra Nilkanth Purandare	Maharashtra	Medicine
1972	Lakhumal Hiranand Hiranandani	Maharashtra	Medicine
1972	Shantilal Chhaganlal Sheth	Maharashtra	Medicine
1972	Sujoy Bhushan Roy	West Bengal	Medicine
1972	(Miss) Mary Varghese	Tamil Nadu	Medicine
1972	Dorothy Woodworth Dunning Chacko (Mrs. C. Joseph Chacko)	Delhi	Medicine
1972	(Mrs.) Sant Kaur	Chandigarh	Medicine
1972	(Smt.) Vatsala Seemant Choudhury	Uttar Pradesh	Medicine
1972	Amiya Bhushon Kar	West Bengal	Medicine
1972	Balu Sankaran	Switzerland	Medicine
1972	Dattatraya Nagappa Pai	Maharashtra	Medicine
1972	Katil Narasimha Udupa	Uttar Pradesh	Medicine
1972	Prithvi Nath Khoshoo	Uttar Pradesh	Medicine
1972	Ravivarma Marthanda Varma	Karnataka	Medicine
1972	Thayil John Cherian	Tamil Nadu	Medicine
1972	Balasubramaniam Ramamurthi	Tamil Nadu	Medicine
1973	Atm Prakash	Delhi	Medicine
1973	Bhola Nath	Uttar Pradesh	Medicine
1973	Govindappa Venkataswamy	Tamil Nadu	Medicine
1973	Jagdish Mitra Pahwa	Uttar Pradesh	Medicine
1973	Jamsaheb Nowroji Vazifdar	Maharashtra	Medicine
1973	Kandarp Tulja Shankar Dholakia	Maharashtra	Medicine
1973	Madampath Kalathil Krishna Menon	Tamil Nadu	Medicine
1973	Nandlal Bordia	Madhya Pradesh	Medicine
1973	Narendra Singh Jain	Delhi	Medicine
1973	Prakash Narain Tandon	Delhi	Medicine
1973	Ramchandra Kishandas Menda	Maharashtra	Medicine
1973	Ramesh Nigam	Delhi	Medicine
1973	Ramchandra Vishwanath Wardekar	Maharashtra	Medicine
1974	Ram Kumar Caroli	Uttar Pradesh	Medicine
1974	Raman Viswanathan	Tamil Nadu	Medicine
1974	Jagmohan Lal Karoli	Uttar Pradesh	Medicine
1974	Jogindra Lal Gupta	Delhi	Medicine
1974	Kadiyala Ramachandra	Tamil Nadu	Medicine
1974	Lala Suraj Nandan Prasad	Bihar	Medicine
1974	Mani Kumar Chhetri	West Bengal	Medicine
1974	Mysore Shrikanta Pandit Nilakanta Rao	Maharashtra	Medicine
1974	Nagarur Gopinath	Delhi	Medicine
1974	Venkatarama Narayanaswami	Tamil Nadu	Medicine
1975	Darab Jehangir Jussawala	Maharashtra	Medicine
1975	Mary Poonen Lukose	Kerala	Medicine
1975	Ali Mohammad Jan	Jammu and Kashmir	Medicine
1975	Dhanpatrai Nagpaul	Uttar Pradesh	Medicine
1975	Reuben David	Gujarat	Medicine
1975	Stanley John	Karnataka	Medicine
1976	Krishnaswami Srinivasa Sanjivi	Tamil Nadu	Medicine
1976	(Kum.) Durga Deulkar	Maharashtra	Medicine
1976	Bhikhubhai Khushalbhai Naik	Andhra Pradesh	Medicine
1976	Krishna Pai Narayana Pai	Kerala	Medicine
1976	Muni Inder Dev Sharma	Delhi	Medicine
1976	Ravindra Santuram Dharkar	Madhya Pradesh	Medicine
1976	Dr.(Kum.) Amy Dhunjibhoy Engineer	Uttar Pradesh	Medicine
1976	Hakim Saifuddin Ahmad	Uttar Pradesh	Medicine
1977	Perugu Siva Reddy	Telangana	Medicine
1977	Balasubramanian Ramamurthi	Tamil Nadu	Medicine
1977	(Miss) Lucy Oommen	Delhi	Medicine
1977	Ram Narain Bagley	Uttar Pradesh	Medicine

== 1980–1989 ==
Year	Name	State	Field
1981	Prafulla Bhagubhai Desai	Maharashtra	Medicine
1981	Dhanwanti Singh	Punjab	Medicine
1981	Krishna Varadachari Thiruvengadam	Tamil Nadu	Medicine
1981	Pramod Karan Sethi	Rajasthan	Medicine
1981	Jasbir Singh Bajaj	Delhi	Medicine
1981	Bakulaben Motibhai Patel	Gujarat	Medicine
1982	(Smt.) Kamal Jayasing Ranadive	Maharashtra	Medicine
1982	Arni Streenivasan Ramakrishnan	Tamil Nadu	Medicine
1982	Jal Minocher Mehta	Maharashtra	Medicine
1982	Atm Prakash	Delhi	Medicine
1982	Jasbir Singh Bajaj	Delhi	Medicine
1982	Chandreshwar Prasad Thakur	Bihar	Medicine
1982	Gopal Krishna Saraf	West Bengal	Medicine
1982	Niranjan Das Aggarwal	Punjab	Medicine
1982	Raj Vir Singh Yadav	Chandigarh	Medicine
1983	Dara Kaikhushroo Karanjavala	Maharashtra	Medicine
1983	Dharam Veer Sachdeva	Delhi	Medicine
1983	Nekibuz Zaman	Assam	Medicine
1983	Purshottam Lal Wahi	Chandigarh	Medicine
1983	R. Ganapati	Maharashtra	Medicine
1983	Sengamedu Srinivasa Badrinath	Tamil Nadu	Medicine
1983	Shishupal Ram	Bihar	Medicine
1983	Dr.(Kum.) Raj Baveja	Uttar Pradesh	Medicine
1983	Prakash Chandra	Delhi	Medicine
1984	(Mrs.) Archana Sharma	West Bengal	Medicine
1984	(Mrs.) Basantibala Jena	Odisha	Medicine
1984	Awadhesh Prasad Pandey	Andhra Pradesh	Medicine
1984	Bal Krishna Goyal	Maharashtra	Medicine
1984	Hariharan Srinivasan	Tamil Nadu	Medicine
1984	Krishna Prasad Mathur	Delhi	Medicine
1984	Mukti Prasad Gogoi	Assam	Medicine
1984	Syed Naseer Ahmad Shah	Jammu and Kashmir	Medicine
1984	Mohammad Khalilullah	Delhi	Medicine
1984	Narayana Balakrishnan Nair	Kerala	Medicine
1984	Prof.(Mrs.) Vera Hingorani	Delhi	Medicine
1985	(Smt.) Usha Sharma	Uttar Pradesh	Medicine
1985	Biswaranjan Chatterjee	West Bengal	Medicine
1985	Gopal Krishna Vishwakarma	Delhi	Medicine
1985	Madan Mohan	Delhi	Medicine
1985	Marthanda Varma Sankaran Valiathan	Kerala	Medicine
1985	Ramniklal Kirchand Gandhi	Maharashtra	Medicine
1985	Samavedam Srinivasa Sriramacharyulu	Delhi	Medicine
1985	Samiran Nundy	Delhi	Medicine
1985	Shital Raj Mehta	Rajasthan	Medicine
1986	Autar Singh Paintal	Delhi	Medicine
1986	Badri Nath Tandon	Delhi	Medicine
1986	Pushpa Mittra Bhargava	Telangana	Medicine
1986	Viswanathan Shanta	Tamil Nadu	Medicine
1986	Santosh Kumar Kacker	Delhi	Medicine
1987	Farokh Erach Udwadia	Maharashtra	Medicine
1987	Daljit Singh	Punjab	Medicine
1987	Harbans Singh Wasir	Delhi	Medicine
1987	Prabhu Dayal Nigam	Delhi	Medicine
1987	Prem Kumar Kakar	Delhi	Medicine
1987	Saroj Kumar Gupta	West Bengal	Medicine
1987	Vaidya Amar Nath Shastri	Chandigarh	Medicine
1988	(Dr.) Pratury Tirumala Rao	Telangana	Medicine
1988	Vithalbhai Chhotabhai Patel	Gujarat	Medicine
1989	(Smt.) Banoo Jehangir Coyaji	Maharashtra	Medicine
1989	Prakash Narain Tandon	Delhi	Medicine
1989	Shiv Raj Kumar Malik	Delhi	Medicine

== 1990–1999 ==
Year	Name	State	Field
1990	Bal Krishna Goyal	Maharashtra	Medicine
1990	Marthanda Varma Sankaran Vaiathan	Kerala	Medicine
1990	Mohammand Khalilullah	Delhi	Medicine
1990	Anutosh Datta	West Bengal	Medicine
1990	Ashok Chimanlal Shroff	Maharashtra	Medicine
1990	Madhav Gajanan Deo	Maharashtra	Medicine
1990	Shriniwas	Delhi	Medicine
1990	Noshir Hormasji Antia	Maharashtra	Medicine
1990	Pylore Krishnaier Rajagopalan	Puducherry	Medicine
1990	Shanmugam Kameswaran	Tamil Nadu	Medicine
1990	Mallappa Krishna Bhargava	Karnataka	Medicine
1991	Muthu Krishna Mani	Tamil Nadu	Medicine
1991	Prathap Chandra Reddy	Tamil Nadu	Medicine
1991	(Prof.) Purushottam B. Buckshey	Delhi	Medicine
1991	(Smt.) Shiela Mehra	Delhi	Medicine
1991	Govind Narain Malaviya	Uttar Pradesh	Medicine
1991	Jagdish Prasad	Delhi	Medicine
1991	Jai Pal Singh	Haryana	Medicine
1991	Kotturathu Mammen Cherian	Tamil Nadu	Medicine
1991	Mahendra Kumar Goel	Uttar Pradesh	Medicine
1991	Mohinder Nath Passey	Delhi	Medicine
1991	Naresh Trehan	Delhi	Medicine
1991	Ravinder Kumar Bali	Delhi	Medicine
1991	Rustom Phiroze Soonawala	Maharashtra	Medicine
1991	Susil Chandra Munsi	Maharashtra	Medicine
1991	(Smt.) Sneh Bhargava	Delhi	Medicine
1991	Prof.(Dr.) Man Mohan Singh Ahuja	Delhi	Medicine
1992	Dr.(Kum.) Sivaramakrishna Iyer Padmavati	Delhi	Medicine
1992	Ramchandra Dattatraya Lele	Maharashtra	Medicine
1992	Thayil John Cherian	Tamil Nadu	Medicine
1992	Hakim Abdul Hameed	Delhi	Medicine
1992	Gursaran Prashad Talwar	Delhi	Medicine
1992	Vaidya Brihaspati Dev Triguna	Delhi	Medicine
1992	(Smt.) Amrit Tewari	Chandigarh	Medicine
1992	Anil Kohli	Delhi	Medicine
1992	Burjor Cavas Dastur	Maharashtra	Medicine
1992	Janardan Shankar Mahashabde	Madhya Pradesh	Medicine
1992	Kameshwar Prasad	Delhi	Medicine
1992	Khalid Hameed	United Kingdom	Medicine
1992	Lovelin Kumar Gandhi (Posthumous)	Delhi	Medicine
1992	Luis Jose De Souza	Maharashtra	Medicine
1992	Mahamaya Prasad Dubey	Delhi	Medicine
1992	Mathura Nath Bhattacharyya	Assam	Medicine
1992	Pakkiam Vaikundam Arulanandam Mohandas	Tamil Nadu	Medicine
1992	Ramesh Kumar	Delhi	Medicine
1992	Rathindra Datta	Tripura	Medicine
1992	Vijaykumar Swarupchand Shah	Maharashtra	Medicine
1992	Dr.(Smt.) Usha Kehar Luthra	Delhi	Medicine
1992	Gopalasamudram Sitaraman Venkataraman	Tamil Nadu	Medicine
1992	Vaidyan Eletathu Thaikkattu Neelakandhan Mooss	Kerala	Medicine
1998	Gurukumar Bhalchandra Parulkar	Maharashtra	Medicine
1998	Maligail Ram krishna Girinath	Tamil Nadu	Medicine
1998	Panangipalli Venugopal	Delhi	Medicine
1998	Dr.(Ms.) Hem Lata Gupta	Delhi	Medicine
1998	Ranjit Roy Chaudhury	Delhi	Medicine
1999	Sengamedu Srinivasa Badrinath	Tamil Nadu	Medicine
1999	Kurudamannil Abraham Abraham	Tamil Nadu	Medicine
1999	Panniyampalli Krishna Warrier	Kerala	Medicine
1999	Raj Bothra	United States of America	Medicine
1999	Rehmath Beegun Sailaniyoda	Lakshadweep	Medicine
1999	(Smt.) Indira Nath	Delhi	Medicine
1999	Vaidya Balendu Prakash	Uttarakhand	Medicine
1999	Vaidya Devendra Triguna	Delhi	Medicine

== 2000–2009 ==
Year	Name	State	Field
2000	(Dr.) Harbans Singh Wasir	Haryana	Medicine
2000	Gurumukh Sajanmal Sainani	Maharashtra	Medicine
2000	Immaneni Sathyamurthy	Tamil Nadu	Medicine
2000	Kirpal Singh Chugh	Chandigarh	Medicine
2000	Mahendra Bhandari	Uttar Pradesh	Medicine
2000	Mathew Samuel Kalarickal	Tamil Nadu	Medicine
2000	Pradeep Kumar Dave	Delhi	Medicine
2000	Vipin Buckshey	Delhi	Medicine
2000	Prof.(Dr.) Kakarla Subbarao	Telangana	Medicine
2000	Vaidya Suresh Chandra Chaturvedi	Maharashtra	Medicine
2001	Chitranjan Singh Ranawat	United States of America	Medicine
2001	Naresh Trehan	Delhi	Medicine
2001	Chittoor Mohammed Habeebullah	Telangana	Medicine
2001	Dasari Prasada Rao	Telangana	Medicine
2001	Jyoti Bhushan Banerji	Uttar Pradesh	Medicine
2001	Krishna Prasad Singh Varma	Delhi	Medicine
2001	Madhavan Krishnan Nair	Kerala	Medicine
2001	Mool Chand Maheshwari	Delhi	Medicine
2001	Sharadkumar Dicksheet	United States of America	Medicine
2001	Dr.(Prof.) Bhupathiraju Somaraju	Telangana	Medicine
2001	Dr.(Smt.) Gouri Sen	Delhi	Medicine
2001	(Ms.) Alaka Keshav Deshpande	Maharashtra	Medicine
2001	Laishram Nabakishore Singh	Manipur	Medicine
2002	Natesan Rangabashyam	Tamil Nadu	Medicine
2002	Atluri Sriman Narayana	Telangana	Medicine
2002	Duvvur Nageshwar Reddy	Telangana	Medicine
2002	Gullapalli Nageswara Rao	Telangana	Medicine
2002	Harsh Mahajan	Delhi	Medicine
2002	Kamaljit Singh Paul	United States of America	Medicine
2002	Karimpat Mathangi Ramakrishnan	Tamil Nadu	Medicine
2002	Pradeep Kumar Chowbey	Delhi	Medicine
2002	Prahlad Kumar Sethi	Delhi	Medicine
2002	Prakash Nanalal Kothari	Maharashtra	Medicine
2002	Suresh H. Advani	Maharashtra	Medicine
2002	Vikram Marwaha	Maharashtra	Medicine
2002	Vijay Kumar Dada	Delhi	Medicine
2003	Vaidya Bhrihaspati Dev Triguna	Delhi	Medicine
2003	Kantilal Hastimal Sancheti	Maharashtra	Medicine
2003	Purshotam Lal	Uttar Pradesh	Medicine
2003	Ramesh Kumar	Delhi	Medicine
2003	Coluthur Gopalan	Delhi	Medicine
2003	Ashok Seth	Delhi	Medicine
2003	Rajagopalan Krishnan Vaidian	Kerala	Medicine
2003	Vijay Prakash Singh	Bihar	Medicine
2003	Jagdev Singh Guleria	Delhi	Medicine
2003	Narayana Panicker Kochupillai	Delhi	Medicine
2004	(Lt.Gen) Bijoy Nandan Shahi	Delhi	Medicine
2004	Arun Trimbak Dabke	Chhattisgarh	Medicine
2004	Ashwin Balachand Mehta	Maharashtra	Medicine
2004	Devi Prasad Shetty	Karnataka	Medicine
2004	Gopal Prasad Sinha	Bihar	Medicine
2004	Sharad Moreshwar Hardikar	Maharashtra	Medicine
2004	Siddhartha Mehta	Delhi	Medicine
2004	Subhash Chander Manchanda	Delhi	Medicine
2004	Surinder Kumar Sama	Delhi	Medicine
2004	(Dr.) Rajan Saxena	Uttar Pradesh	Medicine
2005	Bal Krishna Goyal	Maharashtra	Medicine
2005	Marthanda Varma Sankaran Valiathan	Karnataka	Medicine
2005	Anil Kohli	Delhi	Medicine
2005	Hari Mohan	Delhi	Medicine
2005	Tarlochan Singh Kler	Delhi	Medicine
2005	Yusuf Khwaja Hamied	Maharashtra	Medicine
2005	Kolli Srinath Reddy	Delhi	Medicine
2005	Cyrus S. Poonawalla	Maharashtra	Medicine
2005	Govindaswamy Bakthavathsalam	Tamil Nadu	Medicine
2005	Jitendra Mohan Hans	Delhi	Medicine
2005	Narendra Nath Lavu	Telangana	Medicine
2005	Paneenazhikath Narayana Vasudeva Kurup	Delhi	Medicine
2005	Veer Singh Mehta	Delhi	Medicine
2006	Prakash Narain Tandon	Delhi	Medicine
2006	Jaiveer Agarwal	Tamil Nadu	Medicine
2006	Kewal Krishan Talwar	Chandigarh	Medicine
2006	Dr.(Ms.) V. Shanta	Tamil Nadu	Medicine
2006	(Ms.) Tsering Landol	Jammu and Kashmir	Medicine
2006	B. Palaniappan	Tamil Nadu	Medicine
2006	D. Chinnaiah	Karnataka	Medicine
2006	Ghanashyam Mishra	Odisha	Medicine
2006	Harbhajan Singh Rissam	Delhi	Medicine
2006	Sanjeev Bagai	Delhi	Medicine
2006	Mohan Kameswaran	Tamil Nadu	Medicine
2006	(Hakeem) Syed Zillur Rahman	Uttar Pradesh	Medicine
2006	Tehemton Erach Udwadia	Maharashtra	Medicine
2006	Upendra Kaul	Delhi	Medicine
2006	Prof.(Dr.) Kamal Kumar Sethi	Delhi	Medicine
2007	Balu Sankaran	Delhi	Medicine
2007	Prithipal Singh Maini	Delhi	Medicine
2007	Hakim Syed Mohammad Sharfuddin Quadri	West Bengal	Medicine
2007	(Dr.) Shiv Kumar Sarin	Delhi	Medicine
2007	(Vaidya) Shriram Sharma	Maharashtra	Medicine
2007	Anoop Misra	Delhi	Medicine
2007	B. Paul Thaliath	Uttar Pradesh	Medicine
2007	Balbir Singh	Delhi	Medicine
2007	Mahipal Singh Sachdev	Delhi	Medicine
2007	Manjunath Cholenahally Nanjappa	Karnataka	Medicine
2007	Mohsin Wali	Delhi	Medicine
2007	P. Namperumalsamy	Tamil Nadu	Medicine
2007	Sheo Bhagwan Tibrewal	United Kingdom	Medicine
2007	(Dr.) Ashok Kumar Hemal	Delhi	Medicine
2007	(Dr.) Atul Kumar	Delhi	Medicine
2007	(Dr.) Harpinder Singh Chawla	Chandigarh	Medicine
2007	(Dr.) Narmada Prasad Gupta	Delhi	Medicine
2007	Kallipatti Ramasamy Palaniswamy	Tamil Nadu	Medicine
2007	Mayil Vahanan Natarajan	Tamil Nadu	Medicine
2008	(Dr.) Jagjit Singh Chopra	Chandigarh	Medicine
2008	Nirmal Kumar Ganguly	Delhi	Medicine
2008	(Smt.) Malvika Sabharwal	Delhi	Medicine
2008	Aheibam Jayanta Kumar Singh	Manipur	Medicine
2008	Deepak Sehgal	Delhi	Medicine
2008	Indu Bhushan Sinha	Bihar	Medicine
2008	Keiki R. Mehta	Maharashtra	Medicine
2008	Rakesh Kumar Jain	Uttarakhand	Medicine
2008	Raman Kapur	Delhi	Medicine
2008	Randhir Sud	Delhi	Medicine
2008	Simon Tony Fernandez	Kerala	Medicine
2008	Tatyarao Pundlikrao Lahane	Maharashtra	Medicine
2008	(Dr.) Arjunan Rajasekaran	Tamil Nadu	Medicine
2008	(Dr.) Dinesh Kumar Bhargava	Delhi	Medicine
2008	(Dr.) Shyam Narayan Arya	Bihar	Medicine
2008	(Dr.) Surendra Singh Yadav	Delhi	Medicine
2008	Cannigaiper Uthamaroyan Velmurugendran	Tamil Nadu	Medicine
2008	Mohan Chandra Pant	Uttar Pradesh	Medicine
2009	Purshotam Lal	Uttar Pradesh	Medicine
2009	Jasbir Singh Bajaj	Punjab	Medicine
2009	Brijendra Kumar Rao	Delhi	Medicine
2009	Lord Khalid Hameed	United Kingdom	Medicine
2009	Vaidya Devendra Triguna	Delhi	Medicine
2009	Alampur Saibaba Goud	Telangana	Medicine
2009	Arvind Lal	Delhi	Medicine
2009	Ashok Kumar Grover	Delhi	Medicine
2009	Ashok Kumar Gupta	Maharashtra	Medicine
2009	Ashok Kumar Vaid	Delhi	Medicine
2009	Bal Swarup Chaubey	Maharashtra	Medicine
2009	Devinder Singh Rana	Himachal Pradesh	Medicine
2009	G. Vijayaraghavan	Kerala	Medicine
2009	Kalyan Banerjee	Delhi	Medicine
2009	R. Sivaraman	Tamil Nadu	Medicine
2009	Shaik Khader Noordeen	Tamil Nadu	Medicine
2009	Yash Gulati	Delhi	Medicine
2009	(Dr.) Thanikachalam Sadagopan	Tamil Nadu	Medicine
2009	P.R. Krishna Kumar	Tamil Nadu	Medicine

== 2010–2019 ==
Year	Name	State	Field
2010	Ashtavaidyan E. T. Narayanan Mooss	Kerala	Medicine
2010	Noshir Minoo Shroff	Delhi	Medicine
2010	Panniyampally Krishna Warrier	Kerala	Medicine
2010	Ramakanta Madanmohan Panda	Maharashtra	Medicine
2010	Satya Paul Agarwal	Delhi	Medicine
2010	Belle Monappa Hegde	Karnataka	Medicine
2010	Anil Kumar Bhalla	Delhi	Medicine
2010	Arvinder Singh Soin	Uttar Pradesh	Medicine
2010	B. Ramana Rao	Karnataka	Medicine
2010	Jalakantapuram Ramaswamy Krishnamoorthy	Tamil Nadu	Medicine
2010	K. K. Aggarwal	Delhi	Medicine
2010	Kodaganur S. Gopinath	Karnataka	Medicine
2010	Laxmi Chand Gupta	Delhi	Medicine
2010	Philip Augustine	Kerala	Medicine
2010	Rabindra Narain Singh	Bihar	Medicine
2010	Vikas Haribhau Mahatme	Maharashtra	Medicine
2011	Raghavan Thirumulpad (Posthumous)	Kerala	Medicine
2011	Keki Byramjee Grant (Posthumous)	Maharashtra	Medicine
2011	Indira Hinduja	Maharashtra	Medicine
2011	Jose Chacko Periappuram	Kerala	Medicine
2011	Mansoor Hasan	Uttar Pradesh	Medicine
2011	Pukhraj Bafna	Chhattisgarh	Medicine
2011	Shyama Prasad Mandal	Delhi	Medicine
2011	A Marthanda Pillai	Kerala	Medicine
2011	Prof.(Dr) M. Ahmed Ali	Tamil Nadu	Medicine
2011	Prof.(Dr) Sivapatham Vittal	Tamil Nadu	Medicine
2012	Kantilal Hastimal Sancheti	Maharashtra	Medicine
2012	Devi Prasad Shetty	Karnataka	Medicine
2012	N. H. Wadia	Maharashtra	Medicine
2012	Suresh Hariram Advani	Maharashtra	Medicine
2012	J. Hareendran Nair	Kerala	Medicine
2012	Jitendra Kumar Singh	Bihar	Medicine
2012	Jugal Kishore (Posthumous)	Delhi	Medicine
2012	Mukesh Batra	Maharashtra	Medicine
2012	Nitya Anand	Uttar Pradesh	Medicine
2012	Shrinivas S. Vaishya	Dadra And Nagar Haveli and Daman and Diu	Medicine
2012	V. Mohan	Tamil Nadu	Medicine
2012	Vallalarpuram Sennimalai Natarajan	Tamil Nadu	Medicine
2012	Mahdi Hasan	Uttar Pradesh	Medicine
2013	Nandkishore Shamrao Laud	Maharashtra	Medicine
2013	Amit Prabhakar Maydeo	Maharashtra	Medicine
2013	C. Venkata S. Ram	Telangana	Medicine
2013	Ganesh Kumar Mani	Delhi	Medicine
2013	Gulshan Rai Khatri	Delhi	Medicine
2013	Sudarshan Kumar Aggarwal	Delhi	Medicine
2013	Sundaram Natarajan	Maharashtra	Medicine
2013	Taraprasad Das	Odisha	Medicine
2013	Vishwa Kumar Gupta	Delhi	Medicine
2013	(Dr.) Trichur Viswanathan Devarajan	Tamil Nadu	Medicine
2013	Krishna Chandra Chunekar	Uttar Pradesh	Medicine
2013	Rajendra Achyut Badwe	Maharashtra	Medicine
2013	Pramod Kumar Julka	Delhi	Medicine
2013	Prof.(Dr.) Saroj Chooramani Gopal	Uttar Pradesh	Medicine
2014	(Dr) Neelam Kler	Delhi	Medicine
2014	(Prof.) Rajesh Kumar Grover	Delhi	Medicine
2014	Amod Gupta	Haryana	Medicine
2014	Ashok Panagriya	Rajasthan	Medicine
2014	Ashok Rajgopal	Delhi	Medicine
2014	Kamini A. Rao	Karnataka	Medicine
2014	Kiritkumar Mansukhlal Acharya	Gujarat	Medicine
2014	Lalit Kumar	Delhi	Medicine
2014	M. Subhadra Nair	Kerala	Medicine
2014	Milind Vasant Kirtane	Maharashtra	Medicine
2014	Mohan Mishra	Bihar	Medicine
2014	Narendra Kumar Pandey	Haryana	Medicine
2014	Nitish Naik	Delhi	Medicine
2014	Ramakant Krishnaji Deshpande	Maharashtra	Medicine
2014	Sarbeswar Sahariah	Telangana	Medicine
2014	Siddhartha Mukherjee	United States of America	Medicine
2014	Subrat Kumar Acharya	Delhi	Medicine
2014	Sunil Pradhan	Uttar Pradesh	Medicine
2014	(Dr.) Balram Bhargava	Delhi	Medicine
2014	(Dr.) Daya Kishore Hazra	Uttar Pradesh	Medicine
2014	(Dr.) Indira Chakravarty	West Bengal	Medicine
2014	(Dr.) Jeewan Singh Titiyal	Delhi	Medicine
2014	(Dr.) Mahesh Verma	Delhi	Medicine
2014	(Dr.) Pawan Raj Goyal	Haryana	Medicine
2014	(Dr.) Shashank Ramesh Chandra Joshi	Maharashtra	Medicine
2014	(Dr.) Thenumgal Poulose Jacob	Tamil Nadu	Medicine
2014	Hakim Syed Khaleefathullah	Tamil Nadu	Medicine
2014	Om Prakash Upadhyaya	Punjab	Medicine
2014	Vamsi Krishna Mootha	United States of America	Medicine
2015	Ambrish Mithal	Delhi	Medicine
2015	Ashok Seth	Delhi	Medicine
2015	Dattatreyudu Nori	United States of America	Medicine
2015	Hargovind Laxmishankar Trivedi	Gujarat	Medicine
2015	Harsh Kumar	Delhi	Medicine
2015	Manjula Anagani	Telangana	Medicine
2015	Narendra Prasad	Bihar	Medicine
2015	Nikhil Tandon	Delhi	Medicine
2015	Raghu Rama Pillarisetti	Telangana	Medicine
2015	Randeep Guleria	Delhi	Medicine
2015	Sarungbam Bimola Kumari Devi	Manipur	Medicine
2015	Saumitra Rawat	Delhi	Medicine
2015	Yogesh Chawla	Chandigarh	Medicine
2015	Alka Kriplani	Delhi	Medicine
2015	Yog Raj Sharma	Delhi	Medicine
2015	Prof.(Dr.) K.P. Haridas	Kerala	Medicine
2015	Prof.(Dr.) Tejas Madhusudhan Patel	Gujarat	Medicine
2015	Vaidya Rajesh Kotecha	Rajasthan	Medicine
2015	Jaya Kumari Chikkala	Delhi	Medicine
2016	V. Shanta	Tamil Nadu	Medicine
2016	Duvvur Nageshwar Reddy	Telangana	Medicine
2016	(Mrs.) Anil Kumari Malhotra	Delhi	Medicine
2016	Alla Gopala Krishna Gokhale	Telangana	Medicine
2016	Chandrasekar Seshadri Thoguluva	Tamil Nadu	Medicine
2016	Gopi Chand Mannam	Telangana	Medicine
2016	John Ebnezar	Karnataka	Medicine
2016	Mahipati M. Joshi	Karnataka	Medicine
2016	Nayudamma Yarlagadda	Andhra Pradesh	Medicine
2016	Praveen Chandra	Delhi	Medicine
2016	S.S. Sarkar	Uttar Pradesh	Medicine
2016	Shiv Narain Kureel	Uttar Pradesh	Medicine
2016	Sudhir Vadilal Shah	Gujarat	Medicine
2016	Tapan Kumar Lahiri	Uttar Pradesh	Medicine
2016	(Dr.) Daljeet Singh Gambhir	Uttar Pradesh	Medicine
2016	M.V. Padma Srivastava	Delhi	Medicine
2016	Ram Harsh Singh	Uttar Pradesh	Medicine
2016	Ravi Kant	Uttar Pradesh	Medicine
2017	Tehemton Erach Udwadia	Maharashtra	Medicine
2017	(Smt.) Bhakti Yadav	Madhya Pradesh	Medicine
2017	Devendra D. Patel	Gujarat	Medicine
2017	Madan Madhav Godbole	Uttar Pradesh	Medicine
2017	Mohammed Abdul Waheed	Telangana	Medicine
2017	Mukut Minz	Chandigarh	Medicine
2017	Subroto Das	Gujarat	Medicine
2017	Harkishan Singh	Chandigarh	Medicine
2017	Suniti Solomon (Posthumous)	Tamil Nadu	Medicine
2018	Dr.(Smt.)Rani Bang and Dr. Abhay Bang (Duo)	Maharashtra	Medicine
2018	Yeshi Dhonden	Himachal Pradesh	Medicine
2018	Lekshmikutty	Kerala	Medicine
2018	M R Rajagopal	Kerala	Medicine
2018	Pankaj Manubhai Shah	Gujarat	Medicine
2018	Sanduk Ruit	Nepal	Medicine
2019	Ashok Laxmanrao Kukade	Maharashtra	Medicine
2019	Ilias Ali	Assam	Medicine
2019	Omesh Kumar Bharti	Himachal Pradesh	Medicine
2019	Mammen Chandy	West Bengal	Medicine
2019	Sandeep Guleria	Delhi	Medicine
2019	P.S. Hardia	Madhya Pradesh	Medicine
2019	Sudam Laxman Kate	Maharashtra	Medicine
2019	Ravindra Deorao Kolhe and Dr. Smita Ravindra Kolhe (Duo)	Maharashtra	Medicine
2019	Shadab Mohammad	Uttar Pradesh	Medicine
2019	Dr. Shyama Prasad Mukherjee	Jharkhand	Medicine
2019	Tsering Norboo	Jammu and Kashmir	Medicine
2019	Jagat Ram	Chandigarh	Medicine
2019	R V Ramani	Tamil Nadu	Medicine
2019	(Dr.) Ramaswami Venkataswami	Tamil Nadu	Medicine

== 2020–2025 ==
Year	Name	State	Field
2020	Tsering Landol	Ladakh	Medicine
2020	Yogi Aeron	Uttarakhand	Medicine
2020	Padma Bandopadhyay	Uttar Pradesh	Medicine
2020	Sushovan Banerjee	West Bengal	Medicine
2020	Digambar Behera	Chandigarh	Medicine
2020	Bangalore Nanjundaiah Gangadhar	Karnataka	Medicine
2020	Leela Joshi	Madhya Pradesh	Medicine
2020	Ravi Kannan	Assam	Medicine
2020	Narindar Nath Khanna	Uttar Pradesh	Medicine
2020	Arunoday Mondal	West Bengal	Medicine
2020	Shanti Roy	Bihar	Medicine
2020	Kushal Konwar Sarma	Assam	Medicine
2020	Gurdip Singh	Gujarat	Medicine
2020	Sandra Desa Souza	Maharashtra	Medicine
2021	Belle Monappa Hegde	Karnataka	Medicine
2021	Rattan Lal Mittal	Punjab	Medicine
2021	Chandrakant Sambhaji Pandav	Delhi	Medicine
2021	Jitendra Nath Pande (Posthumous)	Delhi	Medicine
2021	Krishna Mohan Pathi	Odisha	Medicine
2021	Dhananjay Diwakar Sagdeo	Kerala	Medicine
2021	Ashok Kumar Sahu	Uttar Pradesh	Medicine
2021	Bhupendra Kumar Singh Sanjay	Uttarakhand	Medicine
2021	Dilip Kumar Singh	Bihar	Medicine
2021	V. Thiruvengadam (Posthumous)	Tamil Nadu	Medicine
2022	Himmatrao Saluba Bawaskar	Maharashtra	Medicine
2022	Prokar Dasgupta	United Kingdom	Medicine
2022	Lata Anilchandra Desai	Gujarat	Medicine
2022	Vijaykumar Vinayak Dongre	Maharashtra	Medicine
2022	Narendra Prasad Misra (Posthumous)	Madhya Pradesh	Medicine
2022	Sunkara Venkata Adinarayana Rao	Andhra Pradesh	Medicine
2022	Veeraswamy Seshiah	Tamil Nadu	Medicine
2022	Bhim Sen Singhal	Maharashtra	Medicine
2022	Shriguru Balaji Tambe (Posthumous)	Maharashtra	Medicine
2022	Kamlakar Tripathi	Uttar Pradesh	Medicine
2023	Dilip Mahalanabis (Posthumous)	West Bengal	Medicine
2023	Munishwar Chander Dawar	Madhya Pradesh	Medicine
2023	Ratan Chandra Kar	Andaman And Nicobar Islands	Medicine
2023	Nalini Parthasarathi	Puducherry	Medicine
2023	Hanumantha Rao Pasupuleti	Telangana	Medicine
2023	Manoranjan Sahu	Uttar Pradesh	Medicine
2023	G Veluchamy	Tamil Nadu	Medicine
2023	Ishwar Chander Verma	Delhi	Medicine
2024	Ashwin Balachand Mehta	Maharashtra	Medicine
2024	Tejas Madhusudhan Patel	Gujarat	Medicine
2024	Chandreshwar Prasad Thakur	Bihar	Medicine
2024	Prema Dhanraj	Karnataka	Medicine
2024	Radha Krishan Dhiman	Uttar Pradesh	Medicine
2024	Manohar Krishna Dole	Maharashtra	Medicine
2024	Yazdi M. Italia	Gujarat	Medicine
2024	Hemchand Manjhi	Chhattisgarh	Medicine
2024	Chandrashekhar Mahadeorao Meshram	Maharashtra	Medicine
2024	G. Natchiar	Tamil Nadu	Medicine
2024	Radhe Shyam Pareek	Uttar Pradesh	Medicine
2024	Dayal M. Parmar	Gujarat	Medicine
2024	C. R. Chandrashekar	Karnataka	Medicine
2025	Duvvur Nageshwar Reddy	Telangana	Medicine
2025	Jose Chacko Periappuram	Kerala	Medicine
2025	Ashok Kumar Mahapatra	Odisha	Medicine
2025	Budhendra Kumar Jain	Madhya Pradesh	Medicine
2025	Hemant Kumar	Bihar	Medicine
2025	Neerja Bhatla	Delhi	Medicine
2025	Sheikha Shaikha Ali Al-Jaber Al-Sabah	Kuwait	Medicine
2025	Soniya Nityanand	Uttar Pradesh	Medicine
2025	Vijayalakshmi Deshamane	Karnataka	Medicine
2025	Vilas Dangre	Maharashtra	Medicine
