= Thayil =

Thayil is a name. Notable people with the name include:

== Given name ==
- Thayil John Cherian (1920–2006), Indian cardio-thoracic surgeon
- Thayil Jacob Sony George (born 1928), Indian writer and biographer

== Surname ==
- Kim Thayil (born 1960), American guitarist for the band Soundgarden
- Jeet Thayil (born 1959), Indian poet
