= Lists of Padma Shri award recipients =

Recipients of a civilian award in India

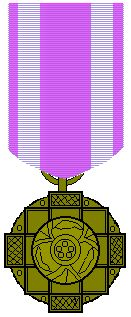

Lists of Padma Shri award recipients cover people who have received the Padma Shri award from the Republic of India for "distinguished service of a high order...without distinction of race, occupation, position or sex."

== By period ==
- List of Padma Shri award recipients (1954–1959)
- List of Padma Shri award recipients (1960–1969)
- List of Padma Shri award recipients (1970–1979)
- List of Padma Shri award recipients (1980–1989)
- List of Padma Shri award recipients (1990–1999)
- List of Padma Shri award recipients (2000–2009)
- List of Padma Shri award recipients (2010–2019)
- List of Padma Shri award recipients (2020–2029)

== By field ==
- List of Padma Shri award recipients in sports
- List of Padma Shri award recipients in social work
- List of Padma Shri award recipients in literature and education
- List of Padma Shri award recipients in art
- List of Padma Shri award recipients in civil service
- List of Padma Shri award recipients in public affairs
- List of Padma Shri award recipients in science and engineering
- List of Padma Shri award recipients in trade and industry
- List of Padma Shri award recipients in others
- List of Padma Shri award recipients in medicine
