= Sancheti =

Sancheti is a surname. Notable people with the surname include:

- Ajay Sancheti (born 1965), Indian politician
- Chainsukh Madanlal Sancheti (born 1953), Indian politician
- Kantilal Hastimal Sancheti (born 1936), Indian orthopedic physician
