= Devendra Triguna =

Indian Ayurvedic physician

- Born: India
- Occupation: Ayurveda practitioner
- Known for: Ayurveda
- Parent: Brihaspati Dev Triguna
- Awards: Padma Bhushan; Padma Shri

Devendra Triguna is an Indian Ayurveda practitioner, known for his expertise in Pulse diagnosis (Nadi vaidyam in Ayurvedic terms). He is a former honorary physician to the President of India and the incumbent president of the Association of Manufacturers of Ayurvedic Medicine (AMAM) and the All India Ayurvedic Congress (AIAC). The Government of India awarded him the fourth-highest civilian award, the Padma Shri, in 1999, and followed it up, a decade later, with the third-highest honour of the Padma Bhushan in 2009.

== Biography ==
Tiriguna was born in a family of traditional Ayurveda practitioner, to renowned Ayurvedic physician and Padma Vibhushan awardee, Brihaspati Dev Triguna and learned Ayurveda from his father. He started his medical practice at his father's clinic, located in the periphery of New Delhi, in a village by name, Sarai Kale Khan. When Triguna retired from active practice shortly before his death in 2013, Devendra Triguna took over the management of the clinic. He claims to have curative protocols for several diseases such as Blood cancer, kidney ailments, abdominal diseases, skin diseases, Spondylitis, asthma, arthritis, insomnia and Hyper tension.

Triguna is the president of the All India Ayurvedic Congress and the vice president of Central Council of Indian Medicines, a Government of India nodal agency. He sits in the Central Council for Research in Ayurveda of the Ministry of Health and Family Welfare and the Ayurveda Pharmacopoeia Committee of the Government of India. He presides over the governing body of the Rashtriya Ayurveda Vidyapeeth, a Government of India centre of higher learning for Ayurveda and the founder president of the International Ayurveda Congress. He sits in the Ayurveda advisory committees of the Governments of Sikkim, Himachal Pradesh and Uttar Pradesh and serves as a member of the Employees' State Insurance Corporation, Board of Ayurveda and Unani Tibbia College and the board of directors of Oriental Bank of Commerce. He is also a former member of the Board of Directors of the Punjab National Bank and a is a visiting faculty of Gurukul Kangri Vishwavidyalaya.

Triguna is an elected Fellow of the Rashtriya Ayurveda Vidyapeeth (1995-95). The Government of India awarded him the fourth highest civilian honour of the Padma Shri in 1999 and he was included again in the 2009 Republic Day honours list for the third highest honour, Padma Bhushan. He has also been honoured by Lal Bahadur Shastri University and Gujarat Ayurveda University with DLitt degrees.
