= Prema Dhanraj =

- Born: 30 June 1950 (age 76); Vellore, Tamil Nadu, India
- Occupation: Plastic surgeon
- Awards: Padma Shri (2024)

Prema Dhanraj (born 30 June 1950) is an Indian plastic surgeon. She was awarded with Padma Shri in Medicine in 2024. She is also known as 'Agni Rakshak' (lit. 'fire warden') for saving thousands of burn victimcs. She also authored three book about plastic surgery.

== Life ==
Dhanraj is originally from Vellore, Tamil Nadu. At the age of eight she survived with 50% of burns when due to stove burst. She had 14 surgeries at Christian Medical College, Vellore. She complete her MBBS at KIMS, Hubballi in 1980, MS in surgery at Madras University in 1986, Master in Chirurgery in Plastic Surgery at Panjab University in 1988 and MD at Christian Medical College, Ludhiana.

=== Agni Raksha ===
Dhanraj and her sister founded Agni Raksha, a NGO, in 1999 to help burn victims. Through Agni Raksha she did more than 25000 plastic surgeries free of cost.

== Awards ==
- Padma Shri in Medicine (2024)
