= Vijayalakshmi Deshmane =

Indian surgical oncologist

- Born: 1955 (age 70–71); Kobal village, Jewargi taluk, Kalaburagi district, Karnataka, India
- Citizenship: Indian
- Education: Karnataka Medical College(MBBS); Bellary Medical College (MS)
- Occupation: Oncologist
- Awards: Padma Shri (2025)

Vijayalakshmi Deshmane (born 1955) is an Indian surgical oncologist from Kalaburagi district, Karnataka. She served as the Director of the Kidwai Memorial Institute of Oncology in Bengaluru.

She was awarded the Padma Shri by the Government of India for her contributions to medicine.

== Early life and education ==
Vijayalakshmi Deshmane was born in 1955 in Kobal village, Kalaburagi district, Karnataka. Her father Babu Rao Deshmane, worked as a labourer at MSK Mill, and her mother Ratnamma, was a vegetable vendor. She completed her primary education at Chakkargatta School in Gazipura and her secondary education at Gangambika High School, Kalaburagi in the Kannada medium. She later completed her Pre-University Course (PUC) at SB Residential School.

Deshmane earned her MBBS degree from Karnataka Medical College and completed an MS from Bellary Medical College in 1984.

== Career ==
After completing her postgraduate studies, Deshmane joined Kidwai Memorial Institute of Oncology, Bengaluru, as a resident doctor. In 1994, she became the first woman professor at the institution. She retired from government service in 2015 and later participated in cancer awareness programs, particularly in rural areas.

In 2016, she was appointed as Head of the National Institute of Pharmaceutical Education and Research (NIPER), Mohali, Punjab, following a medical emergency.

== Awards ==
- 2004: Received Karnataka Rajyotsava Award.
- 2025: Awarded the Padma Shri.
- 2025: Received The Hindu Excellence in Health & Hygiene Award.
- 2025: Received Women of Worth (WoW) Award by the Ubuntu Women’s Network in Bengaluru.
