= Ramakant Krishnaji Deshpande =

Indian oncologist

- Born: India
- Occupation: Oncologist
- Spouse: Geetanjali
- Awards: Padma Shri

Ramakant Krishnaji Deshpande is an Indian surgical oncologist, known as the pioneer of thoracoscopic surgery at the Tata Memorial Hospital. The Government of India honoured him, in 2014, with the award of Padma Shri, the fourth highest civilian award, for his contributions to the fields of medicine.

== Biography ==
Ramakant Deshpande graduated in medicine (MBBS) from Karnataka Medical College, Hubli and completed his postgraduate studies (MS) at the Tata Memorial Hospital, Mumbai. He then underwent further training at the Memorial Sloan Kettering Cancer Center, New York. He also holds the qualifications FICS, Fellowship in Anterior Segment (FIAS), DHA and FAIS.

Deshpande's career started at the Kidwai Memorial Institute of Oncology in 1982. In 1985, he returned to his alma mater, Tata Memorial Hospital, and worked there until 2002 as the Chief of Thoracic Services. He later became the Head of Surgical Oncology at the S. L. Raheja Hospital, which was taken over by Fortis Healthcare in 2009 and became known as the Asian Institute of Oncology, where he served as executive vice chairman. He has also been a consultant oncologist at Lilavati Hospital, Mumbai.

Deshpande has served as a director of several firms, including Karnataka Leasing And Commercial Corporation Limited, Triumph Estates Private Limited, Triumph Hospitals Private Limited, Asian Institute Of Oncology Private Limited and Asian Cancer Foundation. His wife, Geethanjali, has also served as a director of Triumph Hospitals Private Limited.

Deshpande has over 50 publications, including books and articles in national and international journals. He has also contributed chapters to Textbook of Cancer, published by the National Book Trust.

- V R Chitnis, S S Thakur and Ramakant Krishnaji Deshpande (1968). "Endometrial stromal sarcoma". Indian Journal of Cancer. 5 (4): 330–334. PMID 5729399. Archived from the original on 3 March 2016.
- C. S. Pramesh; Gouri H. Pantvaidya; Mufaddal Moonim; Nirmala A Jambhekar; Samin Sharma; Ramakant Krishnaji Deshpande (2003). "Leiomyosarcoma of the esophagus". Dis Esophagus. 16 (2): 142–4. doi:10.1046/j.1442-2050.2003.00298.x. PMID 12823215.
- M. Loui Thomas; Subhada Vivek Chiplunkar; Urmila C Samant; Ramakant Krishnaji Deshpande (2000). "γδ T cells lyse autologous and allogenic oesophageal tumours: involvement of heat-shock proteins in the tumour cell lysis". Cancer Immunology, Immunotherapy. 48 (11): 653–9. doi:10.1007/s002620050014. PMC 11037190. PMID 10663613. S2CID 24688153.

== Awards and honours ==
Deshpande received the Game Changers Award from The HR Club on 7 February 2015.
