= Santosh Kumar Sen =

Indian surgeon

- Born: October 21, 1910; Delhi, India
- Died: 1979
- Occupation: Surgeon
- Known for: Pulmonary tuberculosis and cardiac surgery
- Awards: 1962 Padma Bhushan

Santosh Kumar Sen (21 October 1910 – 1979) was an Indian surgeon and the president of the Association of Surgeons of India. He was the first Indian surgeon to be elected to the Fellowship of the Royal College of Surgeons of England.

Sen was born on 21 October 1910, in Delhi. After early education in Delhi, he graduated in medicine from Lahore and went to Vienna where he practiced surgery under many noted surgeons including Lorenz Böhler. He earned a fellowship of the Royal College of Surgeons of Edinburgh and on his return to India in 1938, he joined Irwin Hospital (present-day Lok Nayak Jai Prakash Narayan Hospital), New Delhi as its first honorary consultant surgeon. During his years at Irwin Hospital, he contributed to the establishment of Maulana Azad Medical College where he served as the first honorary faculty surgeon and the head of post graduate studies. He was one of the founder members of Delhi Surgical Society, served as the president of Delhi Medical Association, one of the oldest medical associations in the world, and Thoracic Surgeons Association, and sat in the court of the University of Delhi. He also served as the president of the Association of Surgeons of India in 1959. The Government of India awarded him Padma Bhushan, the third highest Indian civilian award, in 1962.

Sen was married to Sita, a medical practitioner, and the couple had a son and two daughters. He died in 1979.

== See also ==
- Thayil John Cherian
- Shantilal Jamnadas Mehta
