= Stanley John =

Indian cardiothoracic surgeon (1932–2020)

- Born: August 1932; Munnar, Tamil Nadu, India
- Died: 23 February 2020 (aged 87); Bengaluru, Karnataka, India
- Resting place: Bengaluru, Karnataka, India
- Occupation: Cardiothoracic surgeon
- Spouse: Dr. Lily John
- Children: Dr. Ranjit John Dr. Rohan John
- Awards: Padma Shri

Stanley John (August 1932 – 23 February 2020) was an Indian cardiothoracic surgeon, a former professor at the Christian Medical College and Hospital (CMCH) and one of the pioneers of cardiothoracic surgery in India. He is reported to have performed the first surgical repairs of Ebstein's anomaly, Ruptured Sinus of Valsalva (RSOV) and Double Outlet Right Ventricle (DORV) in India. He assisted in performing the first open heart surgery in India while working at CMCH. During his tenure of 25 years at the institution, he mentored several known surgeons such as V.V. Bashi, A. G. K. Gokhale, J. S. N. Murthy and Ganesh Kumar Mani. Later, John joined Yellamma Dasappa Hospital, Bengaluru at the Department of Thoracic and Cardiovascular Surgery. He is an elected fellow of the National Academy of Medical Sciences, and the Government of India awarded him the fourth highest Indian civilian award of Padma Shri in 1975. He served as the 13th President of the Indian Association of Cardiovascular-Thoracic Surgeons (IACTS) between 1982 and 1983. John died on 23 February 2020, at the age of 87.

== See also ==
- Christian Medical College and Hospital
- Nagarur Gopinath
