= Shrinivas S. Vaishya =

Indian physician

- Born: 7 January 1947 (age 78); Mathura, Uttar Pradesh, India
- Occupation: Physician
- Awards: Padma Shri
- Website: Official web site

Shrinivas S. Vaishya is an Indian physician and the former Director of medical and health services at the Union Territory of Daman and Diu. He was honored by the Government of India, in 2012, with the fourth highest Indian civilian award of Padma Shri.

== Biography ==
Sriniwas S. Vaishya was born on 7 January 1947 in Mathura, in the Indian state of Uttar Pradesh. He did his graduation in medicine from Goa Medical College in 1973 and, later, secured the post graduate degree of MD from the Government Medical College, Surat. Vaishya started his career as a local officer at the Department of Health and Medical Services, Daman and Diu and worked there for 33 years until appointed as the first Director . He retired from government service as the Special Secretary of Health and Medical Services, first such officer to be appointed for the territories of Daman, Diu, Dadra and Nagar Haveli.

Vaishya is credited with the modernization of health facilities in Daman and Diu and, during his tenure. the infant mortality rate in the Union Territory is reported to have shrunk to 14 per 1000 live births, on par with the rest of the country. A Life member of the Indian Association of Preventive and Social Medicine (IAPSM), Vaishya has attended many national and international seminars, conferences and workshops. The Government of India awarded him the civilian award of Padma Shri in 2012.

Sriniwas S. Vaishya lives in Daman and holds a private practice there.
