= Yogi Aeron =

Indian plastic surgeon (born 1937)

- Born: Muzaffarnagar, Uttar Pradesh, India
- Occupation: Surgeon
- Website: dryogiaeron.com

Yogi Aeron is a plastic surgeon from India. In 2020, he was conferred with the Padma Shri by the Government of India for his work in the field of medicine.

== Life ==
Aeron was born in Muzaffarnagar, Uttar Pradesh, India in 1937. He graduated from PMCH, previously known as the King George Medical College where he was admitted after his fifth attempt. He took seven years to finish the four-year Bachelor course. Later, he studied plastic surgery from the Prince of Wales Medical College in Patna, Bihar in 1971. In 1973, he started working as a plastic surgeon in a district hospital in Dehradun. He went to the United States in 1982 to specialize in plastic surgery. In 1983, he bought a four-acre campus that functions as a treatment facility for the underprivileged and a learning center for children. He has been treating burn patients for free since 1985. In 2020, he was conferred with the Padma Shri by the Government of India for his work in the field of medicine. He resides in Malsi, Dehradun, Uttarakhand.
