= Ramesh Kumar (nephrologist) =

Indian doctor and nephrologist

Ramesh Kumar is an Indian physician who specialises in Kidney diseases and a pioneer of nephrology in India and South Asia. He was awarded the Padma Shri in 1992 and the Padma Bhushan in 2003 by the president of India for his pioneering, notable and continued contributions to Nephrology.

A senior consultant with Batra Hospital, Kumar has been former prime minister Atal Bihari Vajpayee's doctor since 1973 and continues to be his personal physician.

== Career ==
Kumar started an artificial kidney program, including kidney transplantation at the All India Institute of Medical Sciences, New Delhi and in Northern India. As the pioneer of Continuous Ambulatory Peritoneal Dialysis (CAPD), he made available an alternate mode of dialysis treatment. Dr. Kumar has authored 118 scientific publications; chapters in books and monographs published in scholarly journals, internationally. He obtained worldwide recognition for identification of cytotoxic drug—Cyclophosphamide-induced sterility.

Kumar identified patterns of kidney diseases in India and established training programs for medical, technical and nursing in nephrology, countrywide.

An alumnus of Agra Medical College, Kumar as MRCP Renal Diseases (1971) from the Royal College of Physicians, was rated the "Best Overseas Young Physician" in the United Kingdom. Within a decade, he was conferred FRCP for his pioneering effort in nephrology and kidney transplantation in India. He is currently working as chief nephrologist and head of the Department of Nephrology & Transplantation at Moolchand Hospital, New Delhi. His department had been designated as Centre of Excellence by the Government of India.
