= Ram Kumar Caroli =

Indian cardiologist

- Born: Uttar Pradesh, India, Bulandshahr Death - 02 Feb 2023
- Occupation: Cardiologist
- Awards: Padma Bhushan; Padma Shri

Ram Kumar Caroli was an Indian cardiologist and a former head of the Department of Cardiology at Ram Manohar Lohia Hospital, New Delhi. A Fellow of the Cardiology Society of India, he served as the personal physician to four presidents of India and as the cardiologist to Jawaharlal Nehru and Lal Bahadur Shastri. He was honoured by the Government of India in 1969, with the award of Padma Shri, the fourth highest Indian civilian award and the government followed it up with the third highest civilian award of Padma Bhushan in 1974.

== See also ==
- Ram Manohar Lohia Hospital
