= Perugu Siva Reddy =

Indian ophthalmologist

- Born: 12 September 1920
- Died: 6 September 2005 (aged 84)
- Occupation: eye surgeon

Perugu Siva Reddy (12 September 1920 – 6 September 2005) was a renowned eye surgeon from Andhra Pradesh, India.

He completed his M.B.B.S. degree in 1946 from Madras University and specialised as an ophthalmologist by obtaining his M.S. degree in ophthalmology in 1952 from Andhra University. He started practising soon after and joined the Osmania Medical College, Hyderabad. He was the director of Sarojini Devi Eye Hospital in Hyderabad until his death caused due to heart attack.

He established T. L. Kapadia Eye Bank, the first eye bank in India in 1964. He presented about 200 papers in international conferences. He held more than 500 eye camps to provide medical help to the poor and needy, especially those in the rural areas. He was known for his skill, speed and dexterity in performing cataract operations; he holds the world record for the highest number of cataract operations by an individual doctor by completing more than 250,000 such operations. He received the Dr. B. C. Roy Award, Padma Shri and the Padma Bhushan from the Government of India in 1982, 1971 and 1977 respectively. The government eye hospital established in Kurnool in 1990 was named after him. The famous Telugu actor Chiranjeevi sought his advice and assistance in the establishment and operations of the Chiranjeevi Eye Bank.
