= Hemchand Manjhi =

- Born: 1 January 1953 (age 73); Chhote Dongar, Narayanpur district, Chhattisgarh, India
- Occupation: Vaidyaraj
- Awards: Padma Shri (2024)

Hemchand Manjhi (born 1 January 1953) is a vaidya from Chhattisgarh, India. He received Padma Shri in medicine in 2024. He is commonly known as 'Bastar's Vaidyaraj'.

== Life ==
Manjhi is from Chhote Dongar, Narayanpur district, Chhattisgarh, India. He has been treating people with ayurvedic methods since he was 15 years old.

He received threats from Maoists accusing him of a connection with iron ore mines and that he took 11 crore from mines. He was moved to Narayanpur town for his safety and provided with Y-level security but later moved to a rented house. After continued threats, he said he will return the Padma Shri award and stop practicing ayurveda.

== Award ==
- Padma Shri in medicine (2024)
