= Praveen Chandra =

Indian cardiologist

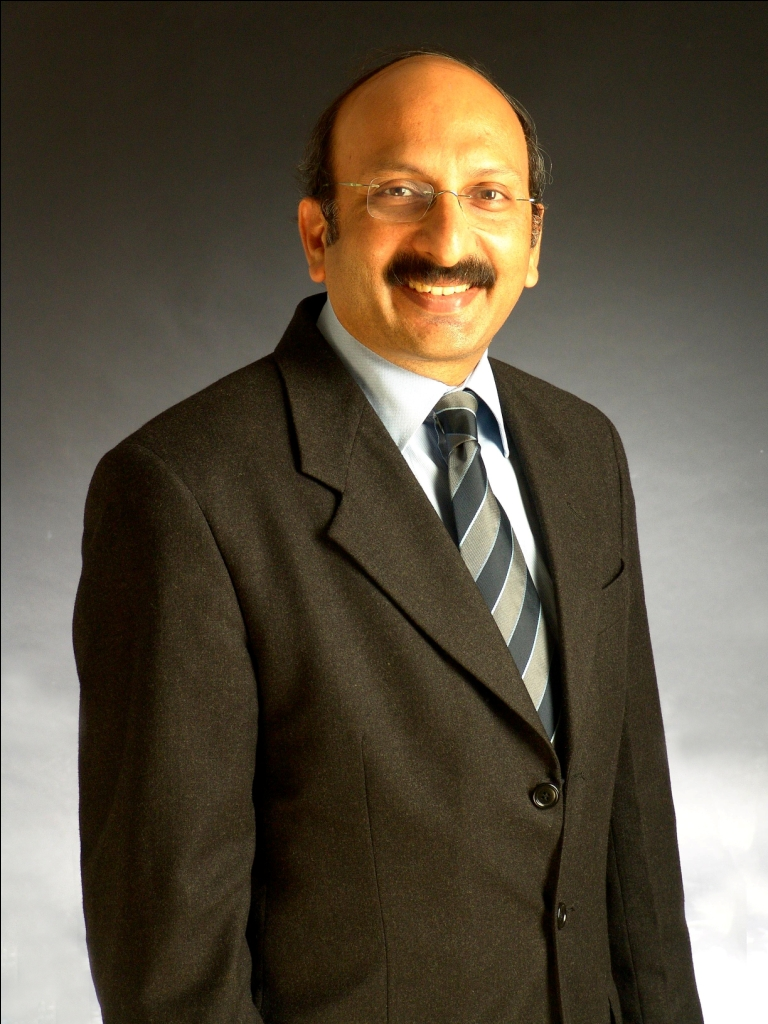
- Born: 15 March 1963 (age 63); Gorakhpur, Uttar Pradesh, India
- Occupation: Cardiologist
- Known for: Interventional cardiology
- Awards: Padma Shri

Dr. Praveen Chandra is an Indian cardiologist and chairman of interventional cardiology at Medanta - The Medicity, Gurgaon, India. He is recognised for his work in the field of coronary angioplasty.

He has also served as the director of Cardiac Cath Lab & Acute MI Services at Max Healthcare and as a consultant cardiologist at Escorts Heart Institute and Research Center, New Delhi.

He is a fellow of the Endovascular Intervention Society of India and the Asia-Pacific Society of Interventional Cardiology. Dr. Chandra has been a distinguished faculty member in various international meetings and was the organiser and director of the AMI course held in New Delhi in 2005 and 2006. He has published approximately 100 articles, reviews, and abstracts in various national and international scientific journals. He is an alumnus of King George Medical College (KGMC), Lucknow. He was born in 1963 in Gorakhpur to Dr. U.C. Verma and completed his intermediate from Colvins Taluqadar College, Lucknow.

The Government of India awarded him the civilian honour of the Padma Shri in 2016.

As a writer, he has contributed to a number of publications including NDTV.
