= Mahesh Prasad Mehray =

Indian ophthalmologist

- Born: 1900; Prayagraj (formerly Allahabad), North Western Provinces, British India
- Died: 1974 (aged 73–74)
- Occupation: Ophthalmologist
- Years active: 1926–1974
- Known for: Sitapur Eye Hospital
- Spouse: Gopi Rani
- Awards: Padma Bhushan; Padma Shri; Dr. B. C. Roy Award; Rustom Merwaniji Alpaiwalla Award

Mahesh Prasad Mehray (1900–1974) was an Indian ophthalmologist and the founder of Sitapur Eye Hospital, a 2500-bedded healthcare group with 32 branches across Uttar Pradesh and Uttaranchal. He was a recipient of Dr. B. C. Roy Award of the Medical Council of India, the highest Indian award in the medical category. The Government of India awarded him the fourth highest civilian honour of the Padma Shri in 1955 and followed it up with the third highest honour of the Padma Bhushan, in 1970, for his contributions to Medical science.

== Biography ==
Mehray was born in North Western Provinces, British India (the relevant part of which is now in the Indian state of Uttar Pradesh) in 1900. After graduating in medicine from the King George Medical College, Lucknow, he served as the Medical Officer at the District Board Dispensary, a primary health centre, at Khairabad, a rural area around 80 km from the state capital of Lucknow. Later, he underwent advanced training in ophthalmology at Egmore Ophthalmic Training Centre, the present day Regional Institute of Ophthalmology and Government Ophthalmic Hospital, and completed his studies in Vienna in 1935. At a time when the healthcare sector was not yet developed in the rural areas of the country, he started a small eye hospital in Khairabad, in 1926, where there was no facility for eye care. The centre started working out of temporary sheds for treating the patients and soon, the facility ran short of space for accommodating the growing number of patients when Mehray moved the centre to Sitapur, the district headquarters.

In 1943, the hospital started functioning at its present location. Over the years, the hospital has grown to become a 1000-bedded facility and has another 1500 beds at the 32 branches located at various places in the states of Uttaranchal and Uttar Pradesh. The Medical Council of India honoured Mehray with the highest Indian medical award, Dr. B. C. Roy Award and the Government of India awarded him the fourth highest civilian honour of the Padma Shri in 1955. He was included in the Republic Day Honours list again in 1970, this time for the third highest honour of the Padma Bhushan. He was also a recipient of Rustom Merwaniji Alpaiwalla Award and honorific titles such as Rai Sahib and Rai Bahadur. Mehray, who was married to Gopi Rani, died in 1974, at the age of 74. Sitapur Eye Hospital has since opened a community centre under the name, Dr. M. P. Mehray Institute of Community Ophthalmogy, in honour of its founder.

== See also ==
- King George Medical College
