= Ashwin Balachand Mehta =

Indian cardiologist

- Born: Surat, Gujarat, India
- Occupation: Cardiologist
- Known for: Interventional cardiology
- Awards: Padma Shri; Maharashtra Gaurav Award; IMA Distinguished Doctor Award; Mahavir Mahatma Award; CTO Man of The Year Award; IIMCCF Lifetime Achievement Award; Andreas Gruentzig Memorial Award; AICT Golden Contribution Award; IJCTO Lifetime Achievement Award

Ashwin Balachand Mehta is an Indian cardiologist and one of the pioneers of interventional cardiology in India. He is the director of Cardiology department at Jaslok Hospital, Mumbai and also serves Breach Candy Hospital, as a consultant. He is reported to have performed the first Cardiac catheterization and Angiography in newborn babies in India, in 1973, the year when he introduced Bundle Electrography in the country. He is also credited with the performance or supervision of over 35,000+ angioplasties and over 75,000+ angiographies.

A fellow of the American College of Cardiology, Indian Society of Electrocardiology and the Indian College of Physicians, Mehta is a former president of the Cardiological Society of India and current member of the society. He is also the president of the Cardiovascular Society of India. The Government of India awarded him the civilian honour of the Padma Bhushan in 2024 and the Padma Shri in 2004. He has also received several other awards as Chemtech Foundation Lifetime Achievement Award (1999), Maharashtra Gaurav Award (2004), Mahavir Mahatma Award (2006), Indian Medical Association Distinguished Doctor Award (2008), CTO Man of The Year Award (2008) and Andreas Gruentzig Memorial Award, among others. He is the eldest son of lawyer Balachand Mehta (1916-2007) who was a highly regarded lawyer and a specialist of the Rent Act. His younger brother Dilip B. Mehta is a respected interior designer in South Mumbai.
