= Ashok Kumar Gupta =

Indian civil servant

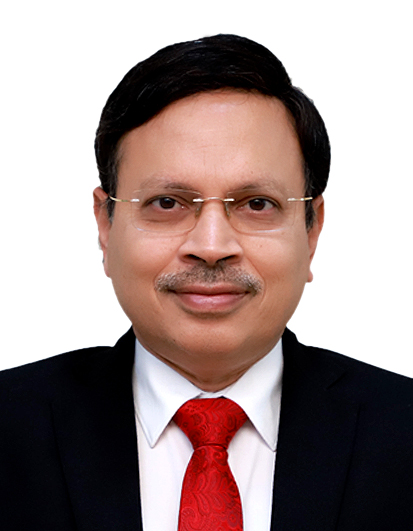

Chair of the Competition Commission of India
- In office 12 November 2018 – 25 October 2022
- Preceded by: Devender Kumar Sikri
- Succeeded by: Ravneet Kaur

Personal details
- Born: 26 October 1957 (age 68)
- Spouse: Dr. Priti Gupta
- Children: Smriti Agarwal & Apoorv Gupta
- Education: Delhi University (Mechanical Engineering); Syracuse University (M.P.A.); Madras University (M.Phil)
- Profession: Civil Servant

Ashok Kumar Gupta (Hindi: अशोक कुमार गुप्ता) (born 26 October 1957) is a retired Indian civil servant belonging to 1981 batch of Indian Administrative Service. He served as the Chairperson of the Competition Commission of India and prior to that he was the Secretary to the Government of India in the Department of Defence Production; CMD, Tamil Nadu Cements; Special Secretary (Finance), Government of Tamil Nadu; and District Magistrate, Villupuram (Tamil Nadu). He also served on the Boards of Central and State PSUs such as Hindustan Aeronautics Ltd., Heavy Engineering Corporation, and Tamil Nadu Cements. Gupta has contributed to the formulation of the Centre's Automobile Policy, Prime Minister’s Rojgar Yojana, and ‘Make’ Procedure in defence procurement. He is currently working as CEO of Dalmia Bharat Foundation.

== Education ==
Gupta has a degree in Mechanical Engineering from Delhi University. Subsequently, he received a Master of Public Administration (M.P.A.) from Syracuse University (USA). Gupta’s Master’s project on "Regulatory Framework for Health Care Organisations in India", contributed to the Central Government’s decision in enacting of the Clinical Establishments (Registration and Regulation) Act, 2010. Gupta received his M.Phil. in Defence and Strategic Studies from the Madras University.

== Career ==
- Chief Executive Officer, Dalmia Bharat Foundation
- Chairperson, Competition Commission of India
- Chairperson, National Financial Reporting Authority (NFRA)
- Hony. Chairman, Forum of Indian Regulators (FOIR)

=== As an IAS Officer ===
Gupta served in the following posts:

- Secretary, Department of Defence Production, Government of India;
- Additional/Special Secretary, Department of Defence Production, Government of India;
- Joint Secretary, Department of Defence, Government of India;
- Joint Secretary. & Sr. Directing Staff, National Defence College;
- Chairman & Managing Director, Tamil Nadu Cements;
- Special Secretary, Finance, Government of Tamil Nadu;
- Joint Secretary, Department of Health, Ministry of Health and Family Welfare, Government of India;
- Director, Department of Heavy Industry, Government of India;
- Director, Department of Small Scale Industries, Ministry of Industry, Government of India;
- Deputy Chairman, Chennai Port Trust;
- Additional Secretary/Special Secretary, Prohibition & Excise, Government of Tamil Nadu; and
- Managing Director, Tamil Nadu Steels.

=== Competition Commission of India (CCI) ===
Gupta was appointed chairperson of the Competition Commission of India (CCI) on 12 November 2018 and has focused on reinforcing the Commission’s enforcement and advocacy actions in digital markets and responding to the disruptions caused by the COVID-19 pandemic.

=== Chairperson, National Financial Reporting Authority (NFRA) ===
Gupta held the additional charge of Chairperson, National Financial Reporting Authority (NFRA) from 1 October 2021 to 31 March 2022.

=== Hony. Chairman, Forum of Indian Regulators (FOIR) ===
Gupta held the position of Hony. Chairman of the Forum of Indian Regulators (FOIR) from 01.10.2021 to 25.10.2022.
