= Shanti Roy =

Indian gynaecologist

Shanti Roy is an Indian gynaecologist. She was awarded the Padma Shri in 2020 for her contribution in medicine. She hails from the Gopalganj district of Bihar. She used to practice in Siwan but now practices in Patna.She is the Head of the Department of gynaecology in the Patna Medical College.
