= Hakim Syed Khaleefathullah =

Indian physician

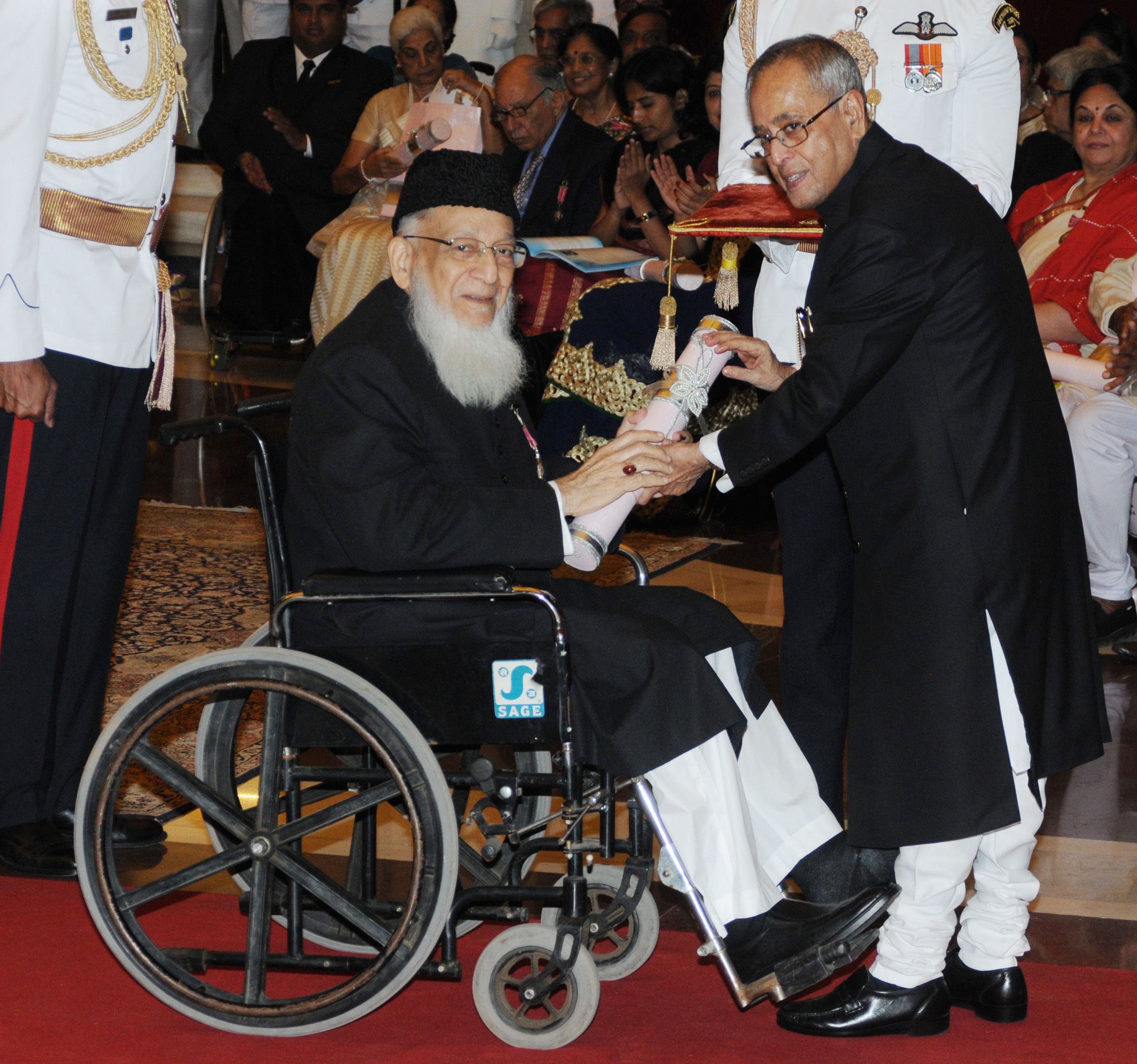
- President Pranab Mukherjee presenting the Padma Shri Award to Prof. Hakim Syed Khaleefathullah, at an Investiture Ceremony-II, at Rashtrapati Bhavan, in New Delhi on April 26, 2014.
- Born: 1938; Chennai, India
- Died: 6 June 2023 (aged 84–85)
- Occupation: Indian physician
- Children: Dr. Syed M. M. Ameen and Dr. Syed M. A. Iqbal and 3 daughters
- Awards: Padma Shri

Hakim Syed Khaleefathullah is an Indian physician and the founder of Niamath Science Academy, known for his scholarship and expertise in the alternative medicine system of Unani. He was honoured by the Government of India, in 2014, with the Padma Shri, the fourth highest Indian civilian award, for his contribution to the field of medicine.

== Biography ==
As the technical advancement in the field of medicine is often not affordable to the poor, cost-effective herbal medicinal systems have a great future in India and other countries says Hakim Syed Khaleefathullah

Syed Khaleefathullah was born in 1938, in Chennai, Tamil Nadu. He studied Unani in the traditional way, and started his medical practice in Chennai. In 1985, he founded Niamath Science Academy, an NGO in memory of the renowned Unani physician, Dr. Hakim Syed Niamathullah, for promoting the Unani medicine system.

Syed published several books on Unani medicine. He had also attended many conferences and seminars in India and abroad, including the International Conference on Eastern and Western Approaches to Healing, conducted at San Francisco, USA in 1985, the Second International Conference on Elements in Health and Diseases, held in Karachi, Pakistan in 1987, International Workshop on Health and Illness in Venice, Italy in 1988 and Parliament of World Religions at Chicago, USA in 1993.

Khaleefathullah's son, Dr. Syed M. M. Ameen, follows in the footsteps of his father and is a locally known Unani physician.

== Positions ==
Hakim Khaleefathullah was the honorary physician to President of India from 1987 to 1991. He serves as the member of the governing body of the Central Council for Research in Unani Medicine, New Delhi and is also the chairman of its Clinical Research subcommittee. He was a member of the Ayurvedic, Siddha and Unani Drugs Technical Advisory Board, Government of India and holds many other positions.

- Professor - Government Unani Medical College, Chennai
- President, Central Council of Indian Medicine (1984–1995)
- Vice President - Unani Committee of the Central Council of Indian Medicine
- Member, governing body, National Institute of Unani Medicine, Bangalore (1986–1997)
- Founder member and chairman, executive board, Central Council for Research in Unani Medicine - Government of India(1996–1999)
- Member of the Central Council for Health and Family Welfare (1999–2001)
- Chairman, Unani Pharmacopoeia Committee, Ministry of Health and Family Welfare, Government of India (1998–2002)
- Founder Director - Central Council of Research in Unani Medicine (CCRUM) -

== Awards and recognitions ==
The Government of India honoured Hakim Syed Khaleefathullah with the Padma Shri award, in 2014, in recognition of his services to the society. The Tamil Nadu Dr. M. G. R. Medical University has instituted a gold medal, in his honour, awarded to the best outgoing student in the discipline of the Bachelor of Unani Medicine and Surgery (BUMS). The other awards and honours received by Dr. Khaleefathullah are:

- Doctor of Science (Honoris Causa) - Tamil Nadu Dr. M. G. R. Medical University - 1998
- Baba-e-Tibb - 1989
- Hakim-e-Millath - 1990
- Physician of the year Gold Medal and Citation - 1990
- Bharat Bishaq Ratna - 1995
- Hakim Ahmed Ashraf Memorial Global Award - 2009, awarded by Hakim Ahmed Ashraf Memorial Society, Hyderabad
