= Jasbir Singh Bajaj =

Indian physician, diabetologist

Jasbir Singh Bajaj (26 September 1936 - 8 January 2019) was an Indian physician and diabetologist. In 2009, he was awarded the Padma Vibhushan, India's second-highest civilian award, for his outstanding contribution to the medical sciences and research, and his efforts to improve the healthcare delivery system. He also received Padma Shri in 1981 and Padma Bhushan in 1982. He was the ninth person in the country to receive the award for services in the field of medicine and research, and one of the very few persons to receive all 3 Padma awards.

Bajaj was a member (health) of the Planning Commission with the rank of Minister of state in 1991–98. He joined the AIIMS faculty in 1966 and in 1979 was appointed professor and head of medicine. He was appointed honorary physician to the President of India from 1977-1982 and from 1987 to 1992. He was also a consultant physician to the Prime minister from 1991 to 1996. He specialized in endocrinology and was honoured by the Karolinska Institute, Stockholm, Sweden when, at the time of its 175th anniversary celebration in 1985, Doctorate in Medicine was conferred upon him. He was a fellow of the Royal College of Physicians of London as well as of Edinburgh, and of the National Academy of Medical Sciences. He was also a founder fellow of the Indian College of Physicians. Prof. Bajaj died on 8 January 2019.

== Awards and honors ==
State honors:

- Padma Shri, India's fourth highest civilian honor (1981)
- Padma Bhushan, India's third highest civilian honor (1982)
- Padma Vibhushan, India's second highest civilian honor (2009)
