= Taraprasad Das =

Indian ophthalmologist

- Born: 1 April 1950 (age 76); Odisha
- Citizenship: Indian
- Education: Sambalpur University; Kanpur University
- Occupation: Ophthalmologist

Taraprasad Das (born 1 April 1950) is an Indian ophthalmologist, who specializes in diseases of the retina and vitreous membrane. He is currently the Vice-Chairman of the L.V.Prasad Eye Institute. He is professor of ophthalmology at the Sun Yet-sen University of Medical Sciences in Guangzhou, China.

== Education ==
Das received his Bachelor in Medicine and Surgery (MBBS) from Sambalpur University in 1978, and a Diploma in ophthalmic medicine and surgery (DOMS) from Kanpur University in 1980. He received his master's degree in Ophthalmology (MS) from Madurai Kamraj University in 1988. He is fellowship trained in diseases of Retina and Vitreous under Professor P Namperumalsamy. He received his Fellowship Royal College of Surgeons (FRCS) from Glasgow.

== Awards and honours ==
An elected fellow of the National Academy of Medical Sciences, he was conferred Doctorate of Science (Honoris Causa) by Ravenshaw University in year 2011. The Government of India honoured him with the Padma Shri award in 2013.
