= Veeraswamy Seshiah =

Indian doctor

Veeraswamy Seshiah FRCP
- Born: March 10, 1938 (age 87)
- Awards: Padma Shri (2022); Dr. B. C. Roy Award (1988)

Veeraswamy Seshiah is an Indian doctor.

== Biography ==
He joined the Madras Medical College and completed his MBBS in 1962. In 1963, he joined the Army Medical Corps and served in the Indo-Pakistani War. For his service, he was awarded the Samar Seva Star and the Sainya Seva Medal.

Following his military service, he joined the Stanley Medical College and obtained an MD. He was appointed an assistant professor in the Madras Medical College. He started the Department of Diabetology in 1978.

He was also involved with establishing the Pregnancy and Diabetes division at the Government Hospital for Women and Children in Chennai. He has been the Founder and patron of Diabetes in Pregnancy Study Group India(DIPSI) since 2004.

In 2019, the Government of India (Ministry of Health and Family Welfare) recognized the significant impact of Gestational Diabetes Mellitus on women's health and took an important step by declaring March 10, the birthday of Prof. Seshah, as India GDM Awareness Day.

Senior diabetologists advocate the use of Metformin by the 8th week of pregnancy to prevent gestational diabetes. When fetal insulin secretion begins, changes happen in maternal metabolism, says Dr. Seshiah. Hyperglycaemia causes non-communicable diseases in later life, so gestational diabetes is the mother of NCDs and transgenerational transmission of diabetes should be avoided.

President of India, Mr Kovind, presented the Padma Shri to Dr. Veeraswamy Seshiah for Medicine in 2022, a distinguished professor of Tamilnadu's Dr. MGR Medical University, for a lifetime.

== Awards ==
- Padma Shri
- Dr. B. C. Roy Award
