= Radha Krishan Dhiman =

- Born: 4 June 1960 (age 66)
- Occupation: Hepatologist
- Awards: Padma Shri (2024)

Radha Krishan Dhiman (born 4 June 1960) is a hepatologist. He was awarded with Padma Shri in medicine in 2024.

== Life ==
Dhiman completed his MBBS in 1984, MD in 1987 at King George Medical College, Lucknow, and his Doctorate in Medicine (Gastroenterology) at SGPGI in 1991. He is director at Sanjay Gandhi Institute of Medical Sciences and the Chairman of AIIMS, Patna.

== Awards ==
- Dr. B. C. Roy Award (2008)
- Padma Shri in Medicine (2024)
