= T. K. Lahiri =

Indian surgeon

Padma Shri Tapan Kumar Lahiri
- Born: 3 January 1941 (age 85); Calcutta, Bengal Presidency, British India (now Kolkata, West Bengal, India)
- Education: Medical College, Kolkata (MBBS)
- Occupations: Cardiothoracic surgeon Medical academic
- Years active: 1972–present
- Employer: IMS-BHU
- Organization: Banaras Hindu University
- Known for: Cardiothoracic surgery
- Spouse: Unmarried
- Awards: Padma Shri

Tapan Kumar Lahiri (T. K. Lahiri) is an Indian cardiothoracic surgeon, medical academic and writer from the state of Uttar Pradesh, India. He is a former professor at the Department of Cardiothoracic Surgery of the Institute of Medical Sciences, Banaras Hindu University. The Government of India awarded him the fourth highest civilian honour of the Padma Shri, in 2016, for his contributions to medicine.

== Biography ==
Born in Kolkata, he passed MBBS from Medical College, Kolkata. Then has done FRCS in Cardiac surgery in 1969 in England and an M.Ch. in thoracic surgery in 1972.

Then he started his career as a faculty at the Institute of Medical Sciences, Banaras Hindu University, where he held the posts of a reader, assistant professor, professor and head of the department of cardiothoracic surgery.

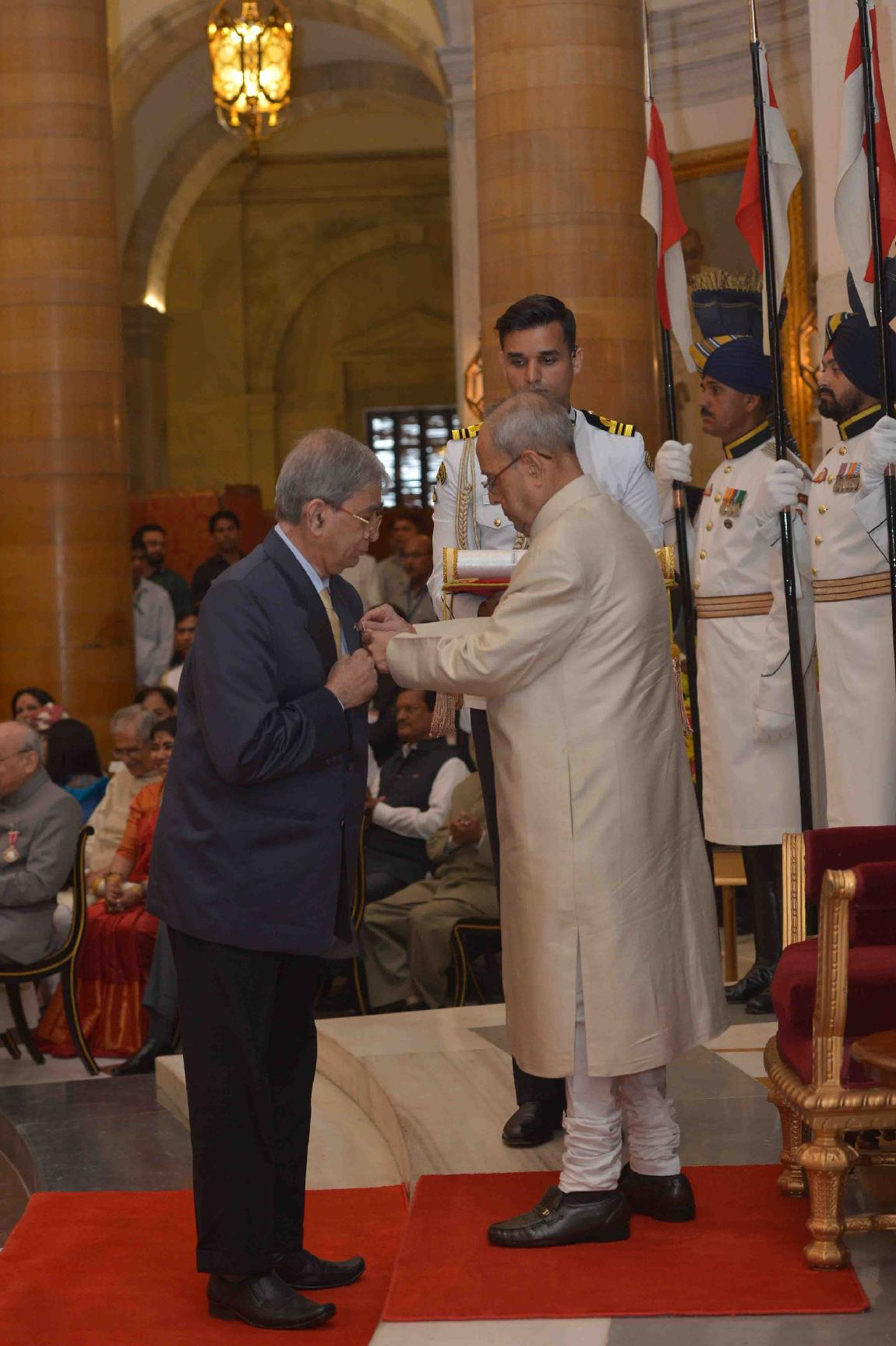
Tapan Kumar Lahiri being conferred with Padma Shri by President Mukherjee in 2016

Post-retirement in 2003, Dr. Lahiri assumed the position of professor emeritus at BHU, opting not to receive a salary and continuing to provide free medical services. Prior to retirement, his basic salary, including allowances, exceeded Rs 1,00,000, of which he began donating the entire amount to the poor from 1994. Despite now receiving a pension, he humbly accepts only the funds necessary for two meals a day, generously donating the surplus to BHU to aid impoverished patients. The Government of India recognized his altruism with the Padma Shri in 2016. Dr. Lahiri’s commitment extends beyond his professional life, aligning with the philanthropic ideals of Pandit Madan Mohan Malviya’s vision for Banaras Hindu University.
