= Dhananjay Diwakar Sagdeo =

Indian doctor

- Born: Nagpur, India
- Citizenship: Indian
- Occupation: Hematologist
- Awards: Padma Shri (2021)

Dhananjay Diwakar Sagdeo is a medical doctor from India who served the tribal people in the village of Muttil in Wayanad district in Kerala, India. He was awarded the Padma Shri, the fourth-highest civilian award in India in 2021.

== Life ==
He completed his matriculation from Hadas High School, Nagpur, enrolled for the medical education at Indira Gandhi Medical College. He moved from Nagpur to Wayanad when he was 24 years old. He has been serving the people of Muttil Village for the past 40 years.

He also established Swami Vivekananda Medical Mission (SVMM) hospital, which was initially started as a clinic but it gradually turned into a hospital. He is currently working as a chief medical officer for SVMM in Wayanad, Kerala.
