= B. K. Goyal =

Indian cardiologist

Bal Krishna Goyal
- Born: 19 November 1935
- Died: 20 February 2018 (aged 82)
- Occupations: Cardiologist, Academician
- Known for: Honorary Consultant Cardiologist to the Texas Heart Institute
- Title: Sheriff of Mumbai
- Term: 1981
- Predecessor: Dilip Kumar
- Successor: Sunil Dutt
- Awards: Padma Shri (1984); Padma Bhushan (1990); Padma Vibhushan (2005)

Bal Krishna Goyal (19 November 1935 – 20 February 2018) was a cardiologist and medical educationist from India. He was an Honorary Consultant Cardiologist to the Texas Heart Institute at Houston, USA. The Government of India honored him with the Padma Shri in 1984, followed by the Padma Bhushan in 1990 and the Padma Vibhushan in 2005.

== Biography ==
Goyal was the honorary dean and chief cardiologist at the Bombay Hospital Institute of Medical Sciences and was a former Director-Professor of cardiology of JJ Group of Hospitals and Grant Medical College, Mumbai.

He was born in the town of Sambhar Lake, Jaipur district. Goyal was a visiting professor of cardiology at the University of Alabama in the USA and a visiting cardiologist to the Oschner Heart Institute, New Orleans. The State Government also honoured him by appointing him as the Professor Emeritus of Cardiology at the Grant Medical College. He served as a member of the Executive Council and Senate of the University of Bombay for several years. He was a member of the Central Council of Health and Family Welfare of the Government of India and also the Medical Council of India. Goyal has also written a book, Heart Talk. He was a former chairman of the Haffkins Institute.

He was proposed for the post of Vice President of India in July 2007 and was the Sheriff of Mumbai in 1980. B.K. Goyal published over 50 works in various recognized Indian and global journals. He authored a book titled Heart Talk. In 2012, the All India Medical Council proposed his name for the position of President of India.

== Awards and recognition ==
An elected fellow of the National Academy of Medical Sciences, he was a recipient of the Padma Shri (1984), Padma Bhushan (1990) and the Padma Vibhushan (2005).

== Death ==
Goyal died in hospital on 20 February 2018 after suffering a cardiac arrest.
