= Chintaman Govind Pandit =

Indian virologist and writer

- Born: 25 July 1895; India
- Died: 7 September 1991 (aged 96); India
- Occupation: Virologist
- Known for: Study of pathogens
- Awards: Padma Bhushan; Order of the British Empire; Padma Shri

Chintaman Govind Pandit, OBE (25 July 1895 – 7 September 1991) was an Indian virologist, writer and the founder director of the Indian Council of Medical Research. He secured his doctoral degree (PhD) from the University of London in 1922, worked as the director of King Institute of Preventive Medicine and Research, Chennai, before becoming the founder director of the Indian Council of Medical Research when the institution was established in 1948. After his superannuation in 1964, he was made the emeritus scientist of the Council of Scientific and Industrial Research (CSIR).

Pandit, besides writing several medical articles, authored two books, Indian Research Fund Association and Indian Council of Medical Research, 1911-1961; fifty years of progress and Nutrition in India. He served as the president of the Indian Science Congress of 1991 and was an elected Fellow of the Indian National Science Academy (1939) and a founder Fellow of the National Academy of Medical Sciences (India).

In the 1943 Birthday Honours list, Pandit was appointed an Officer of the Order of the British Empire (OBE). He received the fourth-highest Indian civilian honour, the Padma Shri, in 1956. The Government of India awarded him the third highest civilian honour of the Padma Bhushan, in 1964, for his contributions to science. After his death on 7 September 1991, the Indian Council of Medical Research instituted a distinguished scientist chair, Dr. C. G. Pandit National Chair, in his honour.
