= Shyama Prasad Mandal =

Indian orthopedic surgeon

- Born: 13 June 1940 (age 86); India
- Occupation: Orthopedic surgeon
- Years active: 1965-
- Known for: Sports medicine
- Spouse: Anandita Mandal
- Children: Pratip Mandal Adhip Mandal
- Parent: Kalipada Mandal Jayabati Mandal
- Awards: Padma Shri

Shyama Prasad Mandal is an Indian orthopedic surgeon and the co-chairperson of Sir Ganga Ram Hospital, New Delhi. After securing his graduate and MS degrees from the All India Institute of Medical Sciences, New Delhi, he continued his education to secure the degree of MCh in orthopedics from Liverpool University. He is a former president of the Indian Orthopaedic Association as well as the president of its Building Committee and the incumbent president of Board of Trustees of Amarjyoti Charitable Trust, a not-for-profit organization engaged in educational and rehabilitation service. He has been involved with the organization of medical conferences, and was the co-chairman of the organizing committee of Knee and Arthroscopy Workshop of 2008 and the patron of the Lower Limb Symposia of 2012, conducted jointly by the Indian Federation of Sports Medicine, Indian Arthroscopy Society and Indian Association of Sports Medicine. He was in the news when he examined Sachin Tendulkar in 1999 for his recurring back injury. The Government of India awarded him the fourth highest civilian honour of the Padma Shri, in 2011, for his contributions to medical science. He is also a recipient of a civilian honor from the Government of Bangladesh. Indian Orthopedic Association has instituted an award, S. P. Mandal Gold Medal, in his honor.

== See also ==
- Sir Ganga Ram Hospital
