= Arunoday Mondal =

Indian Physician

- Other names: Sundarbaner Sujon
- Occupation: Physician
- Awards: Padma Shri (2020)
- Website: http://sujan-sundarban.org/

Arunoday Mondal, popularly known as Sundarbaner Sujan, is an Indian physician from West Bengal. He was conferred with Padma Shri in 2020 for his contribution in medicine.

== Biography ==
Mondal is a physician of Dr. B.C. Roy Memorial Hospital for Children. He quit his job in 1980 and started to give treatments to his patients from his chamber at Birati.

Every Saturday Mondal went to Sahebkhali, a village of North 24 Parganas. He had to travel 6 hours to reach there. He starts his treatment there in Sunday. 80% of his patients are poor. He provides them free treatment and medicine. After serving all day he returns to his home at night.

Mondal treated more than 4,000 people. He established there a charitable clinic in 2000 which name is Sujan. He also conducts medical camps and blood donation camps for the people of the villages of Sundarban.

Mondal was conferred with Padma Shri in 2020 for his contribution in medicine.
