= Narendra Prasad Misra =

Indian physician (1932–2021)

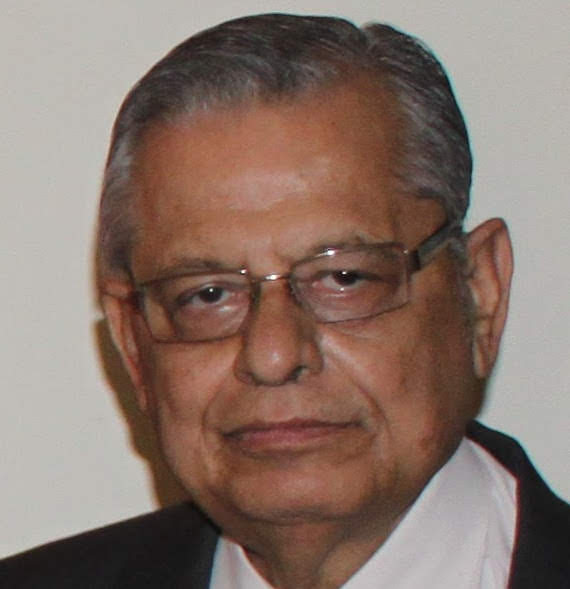
DR NP Misra

Narendra Prasad Misra (10 July 1932 – 5 September 2021) was an Indian physician known for his pivotal role during the Bhopal gas tragedy and his contributions to medical education. Originally from Gwalior, he lived in Bhopal in the Indian state of Madhya Pradesh.

== Early life and education ==
Misra was born in Vidisha in 1932. He completed his B.Sc. with first rank in university. He received his MBBS and MD degrees from Gajra Raja Medical College, Gwalior. He obtained his MRCP in 1967 and became a FRCP in 1973.

As a Commonwealth Scholar at the University of London, he trained in gastroenterology, cardiology, chest diseases, neurology and advanced medicine at Royal Post Graduate Medical School (Hammersmith Hospital). He also trained at the National Institute of Health, Washington.

== Career ==
Misra joined Gandhi Medical College, Bhopal as a lecturer in January 1960. In 1972, he became the head of the department of medicine, a department which has since been named in his honor. After a distinguished career spanning over three decades, he retired as the Dean of the college on October 31, 1992. His work and expertise were recognized internationally, including being interviewed by Ed Bradley for CBS's 60 Minutes about the long-term health impacts of the disaster. In that interview, he estimated that approximately 40,000 people had suffered permanent lung damage from the gas leak and warned about potential genetic damage that could lead to increased cancer risks and birth defects in future generations.

=== Response to Bhopal disaster ===
The disaster was caused by a gas leak accident on the night of 2–3 December 1984 at the Union Carbide India Limited (UCIL) pesticide plant in Bhopal. It is considered among the world's worst industrial disasters.

During the Bhopal gas tragedy, Misra played a crucial role in organizing the medical response at Hamidia Hospital. When the disaster struck, he quickly established a system to handle more than ten thousand victims. As documented in Dominique LaPierre's book "Five Past Midnight in Bhopal", Misra recognized early that the toxic cloud's impact was just beginning and took immediate action to transform the campus between the Medical College and Hamidia into a field hospital.

His immediate response included coordinating with pharmacists to collect bronchodilators, antispasmodics, eye-lotions, heart tonics, and other medical supplies; contacting medical faculty in Indore and Gwalior to arrange emergency medicine transfers; organizing oxygen supplies from local firms; and mobilizing medical students from their hostels for emergency response.

His team treated 170,000 patients in one day. He stated: "The first problem was that of numbers. My team treated 170,000 patients in one day. The second problem was lack of information. UCC informed us that the gas was not toxic. They insisted that most of the casualties were result of panic created by people running and inhaling gas. I tried to organize bulk supplies of medicines. I rang up colleagues and civil surgeon friends in neighboring towns like Sehore, Raisen, Hosangabad (Narmadapuram), and Vidisha and asked them to send supply of medicines and necessary staff like nurses and ward boys. I called up local chemists and asked them to pool in their stocks . . ."

== Personal life ==
Misra was married to Maya Misra (14 June 1938 - 17 December 1986). He had three sons, including Vishal Misra.

== Recognition ==
- In 2022 the Government of India posthumously conferred the Padma Shri award upon him, the third-highest award in the Padma series of awards. The award named him "Bhopal's Senior Most Doctor known for developing treatment protocols for victims of Bhopal Gas Tragedy as well as Covid."
- "Dr B C Roy Award" by Medical Council of India (1992)
- "Gifted Teacher Award" by the Association of Physicians of India (1995)

== Books ==
Misra authored a book on cardiology which is popular among cardiology students. The book titled Progress in Cardiology was released by the then President of India Shankar Dayal Sharma.

== Research publications ==
- N P Misra; et al. (1987). "Early Observations on lung function studies in symptomatic "gas" exposed population of Bhopal" (PDF). Indian Journal of Medical Research. 86 (Supplement): 1–10.
- N P Misra; et al. (1987). "Clinical profile of gas leak victims in acute phase after Bhopal episode" (PDF). Indian Journal of Medical Research. 86 (Supplement): 11–19.
- N P Misra; et al. (1986). "Bhopal tragedy - A year later". Journal of the Associations of the Physicians of India. 34 (4): 307. PMID 3759842.
- N P Misra; et al. (1988). "A clinical study of toxic gas poisoning in Bhopal, India". Indian Journal of Experimental Biology. 26 (3): 201–204. PMID 3397126.
- N P Misra; et al. (1989). "Bronchoalveolar lavage study in victims of toxic gas leak at Bhopal" (PDF). Indian Journal of Medical Research. 90: 407–414. PMID 2628309.
- N P Misra; et al. (1995). "Chronic lung inflammation in victims of toxic gas leak at Bhopal" (PDF). Respiratory Medicine. 89 (2): 105–11. doi:10.1016/0954-6111(95)90192-2. PMID 7708994.

== See also ==
- Padma Shri Award recipients in the year 2022
