= Nagarur Gopinath =

Indian cardiothoracic surgeon (1922 - 2007)

- Born: 13 November 1922; Bellary, Karnataka, British India
- Died: 3 June 2007 (aged 84); New Delhi, India
- Occupation: Cardiothoracic surgeon
- Known for: Open heart surgery Perfusion
- Spouse: Rama
- Children: A daughter and two sons
- Parent(s): Nagarur Narayana Rao; Sundaramma
- Awards: Padma Shri; Dr. B. C. Roy Award; Wockhardt Lifetime Achievement Award; IACTS Lifetime Achievement Award

Nagarur Gopinath (13 November 1922 – 3 June 2007) was an Indian surgeon and one of the pioneers of cardiothoracic surgery in India. He is credited with the first successful performance of open heart surgery in India which he performed in 1962. He served as the honorary surgeon to two Presidents of India and was a recipient of the fourth highest Indian civilian award of Padma Shri in 1974 and Dr. B. C. Roy Award, the highest Indian medical award in 1978 from the Government of India.

== Biography ==
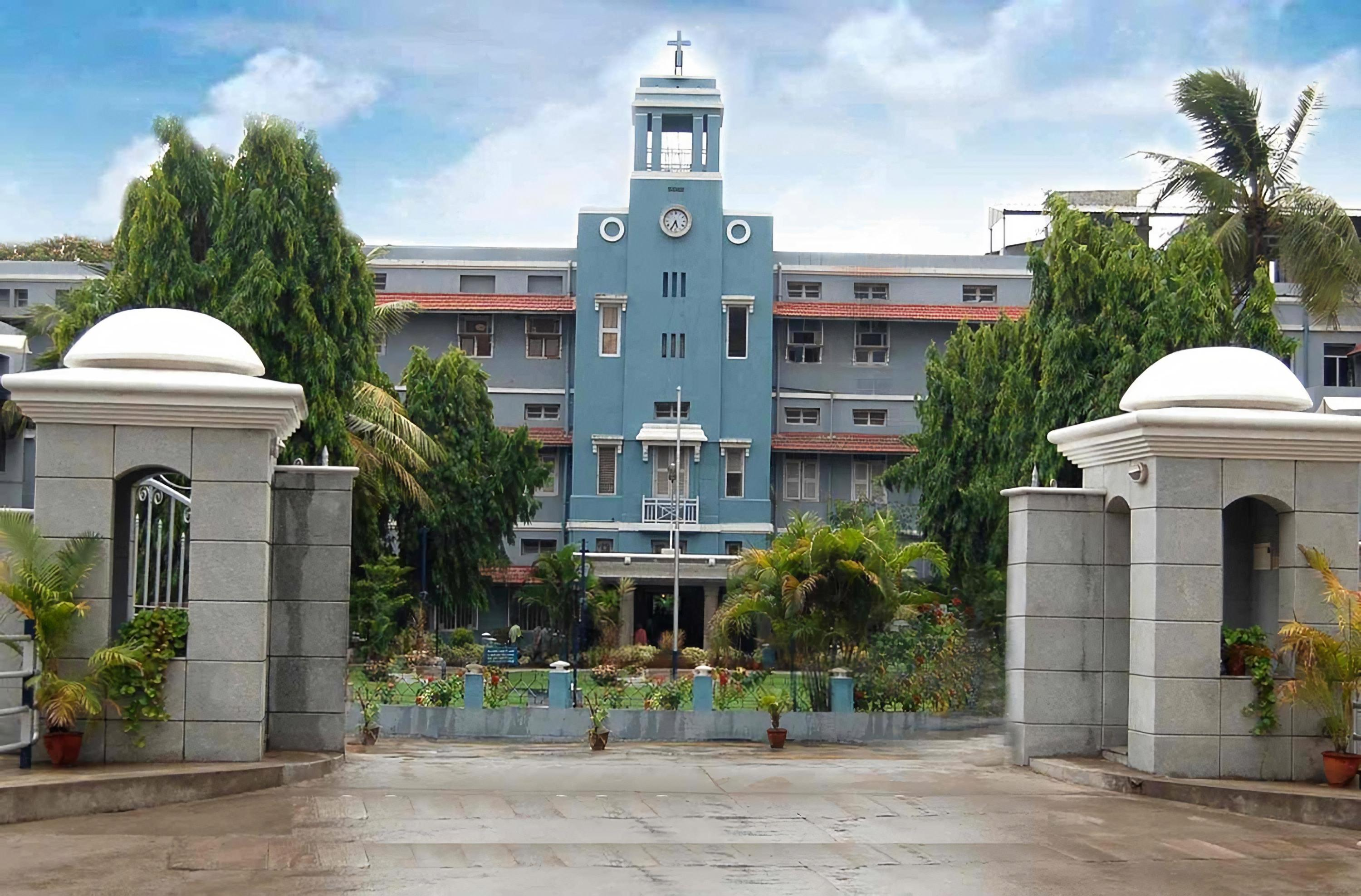
CMCH Vellore

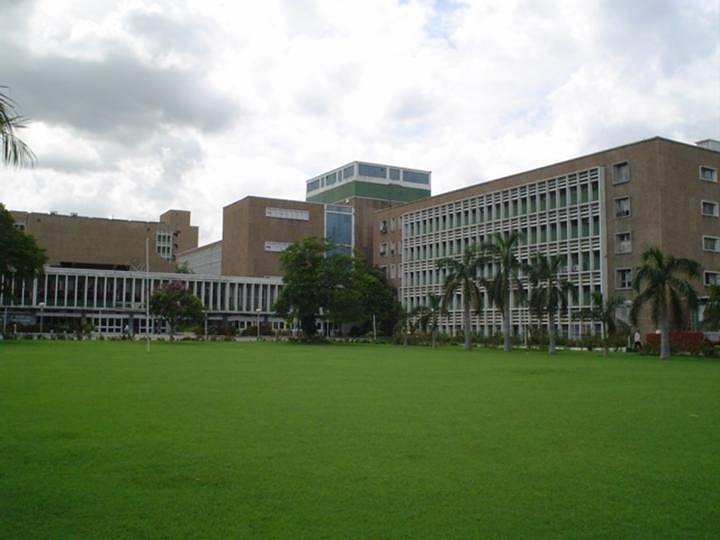
AIIMS, New Delhi, central lawn

Gopinath was born on 13 November 1922 in Bellary, a historic city with many neolithic archaeological sites, in the south Indian state of Karnataka to Sundaramma and Nagarur Narayana Rao. He did his schooling at a local school in Bellary and graduated from the Madras Christian College, Tambaram after which he passed the graduate degree in medicine from the Madras Medical College. His career started in the Royal Army Medical Corps in the British India where he worked with renowned cardiologist, Samuel Oram and surgeon, Leigh Collis at Lahore, Pune and Yangon. After retiring from the Army Corps, Gopinath joined Arogyavaram Medical Centre, then known as Union Mission Tuberculosis Sanatorium at near Madanapalle, in the Andhra Pradesh district of Chittoor and worked there till 1951. In April that year, he moved to Vellore to join the Christian Medical College and Hospital (CMCH) at their cardiology department as a trainee under Reeve Hawkins Betts, who started the department of cardio-vascular thoracic surgery in 1949 at CMC and the founding president of the Indian Association of Cardiovascular Thoracic Surgeons (IACTS).

The move to CMCH gave Gopinath the opportunity to interact with some of the noted medical doctors in India such as A. K. Basu, Meherji Mehta and B. L. Gupta. In 1957, he received the Rockefeller Foundation fellowship with which he did advanced training till 1958 under C. Walton Lillehei, an American pioneer of open heart surgery, at the University of Minnesota Hospitals in Minneapolis, USA. With the assistance of R. H. Betts, he passed MS in thoracic surgery from CMCH in their first batch in 1960. He stayed at CMCH till 1964 during which period he set up a research laboratory for open heart surgery programme and conducted over 20 tests on dogs. In April 1964, he moved to the All India Institute of Medical Sciences (AIIMS) to take up the post of the chief of department of cardiothoracic surgery there. At AIIMS, he, along with the then head of cardiology department, Sujoy B. Joshi, established a combined group of Cardiology and Cardiac surgeons.

Retiring from the AIIMS in 1982, Gopinath engaged himself with research activities at Sitaram Bhartia Institute Hospital in New Delhi. He died on 3 June 2007 at the age of 85, survived by his daughter Latha, and two sons, Madhu and Ashok.

== Legacy ==
To call Professor Gopinath a legend or icon will be an understatement as he was an institution by himself,

— Panangipalli Venugopal about his mentor, Nagarur Gopinath.

Gopinath was one of the pioneers of open heart surgery and perfusion in India. In 1962, he performed the first successful surgery for closure of an atrial and a ventricular septal defect at Christian Medical College and Hospital. He also introduced pioneering methods in rheumatic heart surgery and cardiac pacemaker implantation. His efforts have been reported behind the introduction of open heart surgery at AIIMS, New Delhi in 1964 when he established the department of cardiothoracic surgery at the institution. The same year, he is known to have started the course for MCh in cardiovascular thoracic surgery. In 1982, when AIIMS opened the Cardiothoracic Sciences Centre, Gopinath became its founder chief. His efforts are reported behind the centre receiving two grants, one from the Swedish International Development Agency (SIDA) and the other from the Department of Science and Technology of the Government of India. The centre has now grown into a 200 bedded independent healthcare facility. Gopinath's early researches were on the juvenile mitral stenosis, a disease affecting the mitral valve making it shrink, its clinicopathological features and the disease management. Later, he focused his research on aorta, the largest artery and aortic valve and his efforts helped to create a human and animal heart valve bank at AIIMS, New Delhi. Towards later stages, he became interested in preventive cardiology and he undertook an epidemiological study of coronary artery diseases and its pathogenesis to find out how the disease could be modulated through nutrition and antioxidants. His researches have been documented by way of several articles, the first one published in 1952 in the Indian Journal of Medical Research, discussing about the advent of thoracic surgery in India. The first of his medical papers was published in 1953. He also produced many monographs on preventive cardiology.

Gopinath, along with Sujay B. Roy, organised the first joint conference of the Cardiologists and Cardiothoracic Surgeons at the All India Institute of Medical Sciences, New Delhi in August 1972. He was associated with the Indian Association of Cardiovascular and Thoracic Surgeons (IACTS), serving as its general secretary and president during different tenures and with the Indian National Science Academy as a council member from 1985 to 1987. He served as a visiting professor at the School of Medicine, Stanford University, USA and kept in touch with some of the notable medical personalities in the world such as Brian Barratt-Boyes, Denton Cooley, Christian Bernard and Donald Ross; some of them visited India on his invitation. He is also known to have mentored over 60 cardiac surgeons which included Panangipalli Venugopal who performed the first successful heart transplant surgery in India, M. R. Girinath, Padma Bhushan winner and chief cardiothoracic surgeon at Apollo Hospitals, Chennai, I. M. Rao formerly of AIIMS, New Delhi, A. Sampath Kumar of AIIMS, New Delhi and Stanley John, Padma Shri awardee.

== Awards and honours ==
Gopinath, who served as the honorary surgeon to two of the presidents of India, received the Rockefeller Foundation fellowship in 1957 which assisted him in his training at the University of Minnesota. He was a fellow of the National Science Foundation, USA and the Lillehei Surgical Society, USA and an elected fellow of the National Academy of Medical Sciences and the Indian National Science Academy (INSA), one of the few medical doctors to receive the honour. He was a professor emeritus of the All India Institute of Medical Sciences, New Delhi and a recipient of the Lifetime Achievement awards from Wockhardt and the Association of Cardio Vascular and Thoracic Surgeons of India. The Government of India awarded him the civilian honour of Padma Shri in 1974. Four years later, he received Dr. B. C. Roy Award, the highest Indian award in the medical category, from the Medical Council of India in 1978. After his death in 2007, AIIMS, New Delhi instituted an annual oration in his honour.

== See also ==
- C. Walton Lillehei
- Panangipalli Venugopal
- Christian Medical College and Hospital
- AIIMS, New Delhi
- Open heart surgery
