= Prakash Narain Tandon =

Indian neuroscientist and neurosurgeon (born 1928)

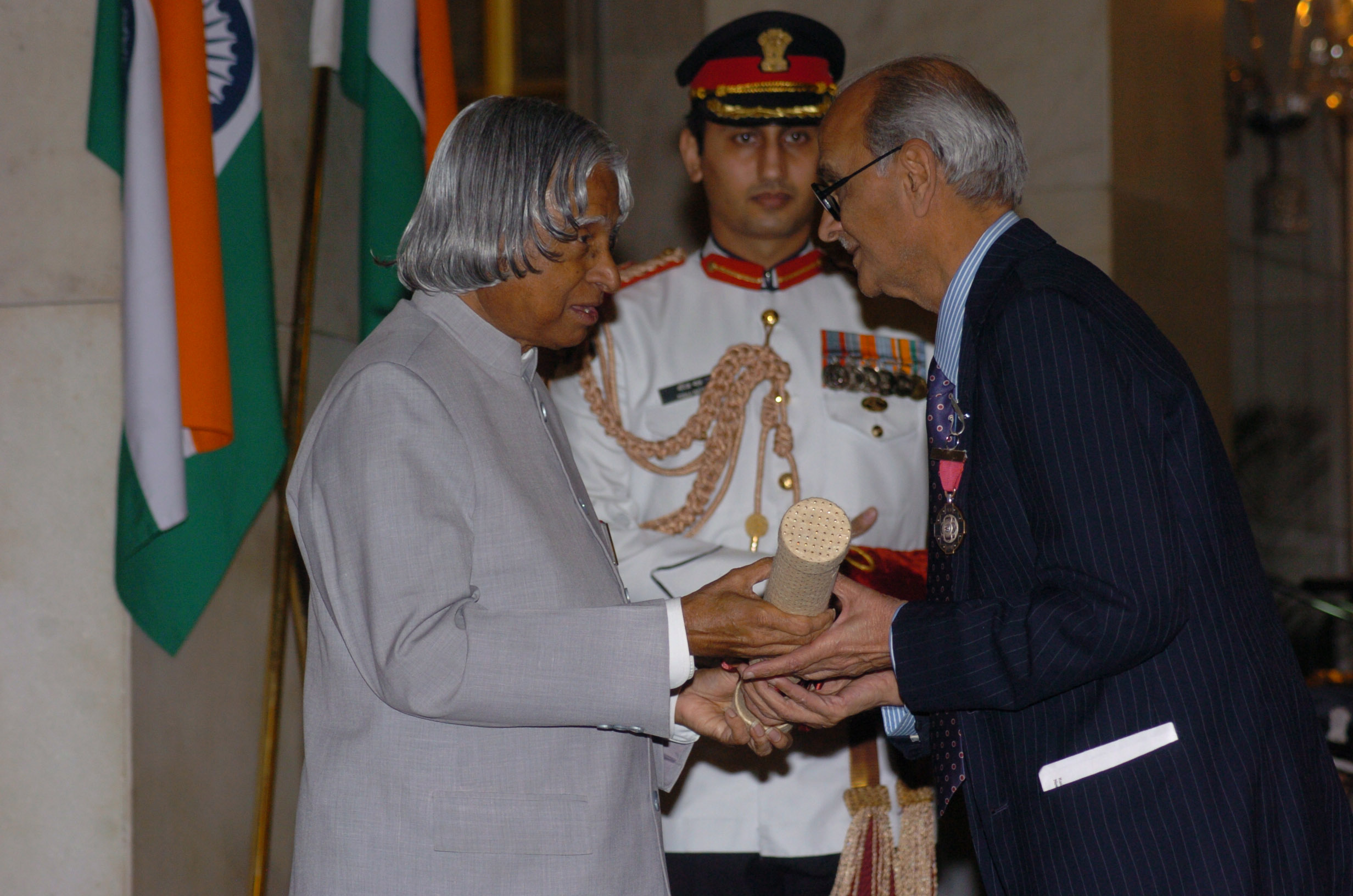
The President, A.P.J. Abdul Kalam presenting Padma Vibhushan to Prakash Narain Tandon, an eminent Neurosurgeon, at investiture ceremony, in New Delhi on 29 March 2006

Prakash Narain Tandon (born 13 August 1928) is an Indian neuroscientist and neurosurgeon.

Hailing from Himachal Pradesh. He graduated with an MBBS and MS from the [KGMC] in 1950 and 52 respectively, and then trained at the University of London and obtained his FRCS in 1956. He further obtained specialist training in neurosurgery at Oslo, Norway and Montreal, Canada. After a brief tenure as a professor at the K.G. Medical College, Lucknow (1963–65), he moved to the All India Institute of Medical Sciences, New Delhi where he founded the neurosurgery department, has been a professor of neurosurgery, a Bhatnagar Fellow (CSIR) and then a professor emeritus. Tandon, an elected fellow of the National Academy of Medical Sciences, was the President of the Indian National Science Academy in 1991-92 and has been awarded the Padma Shri (1973) and Padma Bhushan (1991) by the Government of India. He is also a recipient of the Lifetime Achievement Award of Madras Neuro Trust. Tandon also serves as the president of the National Brain Research Centre Society, Manesar, Haryana, India. He is a member of the Norwegian Academy of Science and Letters. Noted neurosurgeon B. K. Misra is one of his students.
