= Ishwar Chander Verma =

- Born: 25 December 1936; Kenya
- Died: 8 February 2024 (aged 87)
- Occupation: genetic medicine specialist
- Awards: Padma Shri (2023)

Ishwar Chander Verma (25 December 1936 - 8 Feb 2024) was a specialist in genetic medicine. He was an advisor at Ganga Ram Hospital. He was the only doctor from delhi to get the Padma Shri in 2023.

== Life ==
Verma was born on 25 December 1936 in Kenya. He completed his MBBS at Amritsar Medical College. He practised in East Africa for one and a half years, after which he obtained training in paediatrics and genetics from London, the Children's Hospital in Zurich, Massachusetts General Hospital in Boston, and the National Institutes of Health in Bethesda, Maryland. He worked at the All India Institutes of Medical Sciences (AIIMS) from 1967 to 1996. He died on 8 February 2024.

== Honours ==
- FRCP Fellowship
- Ranbaxy Science Award
- ICMR
- NAMS
- Dr. B. C. Roy Award (1983)
- FICCI 9th healthcare excellence award (2017)
- Padma Shri (2023)
