= Ganesh Kumar Mani =

Indian cardiothoracic surgeon

- Born: 1954-11-18; Delhi, India
- Occupations: Cardiothoracic and vascular surgeon
- Spouse: Manju
- Children: 2 children
- Awards: Padma Shri; Principal Medal; National Citizens Award; MAMC Alumnus Award; WCCPGC Life Time Achievement Award; Larsen and Toubro Award; IMA Dr. K. Sharan Cardiology Excellence Award; IMA Lifetime Achievement Award; Rotary Appreciation Award; DMA Chikitsa Ratan Award

Ganesh Kumar Mani is an Indian cardiothoracic and vascular surgeon, reported to have performed over 20,500 Coronary artery bypass surgeries. He was honoured by the Government of India, in 2013, by bestowing on him the Padma Shri, the fourth highest civilian award, for his contributions to the fields of medicine and medical education.

== Biography ==
Saving the life of my friend Dr. E Sreedharan. He had developed multiple blockages and was unconscious at the air port. I was confused about my strategy to save him. Finally, I prepared for his arrival at Apollo Hospital, temporary pace makers were in place and he was operated upon the next day. I feel happy and proud when my memory takes me back that eventful life saving day, says Dr. Mani.

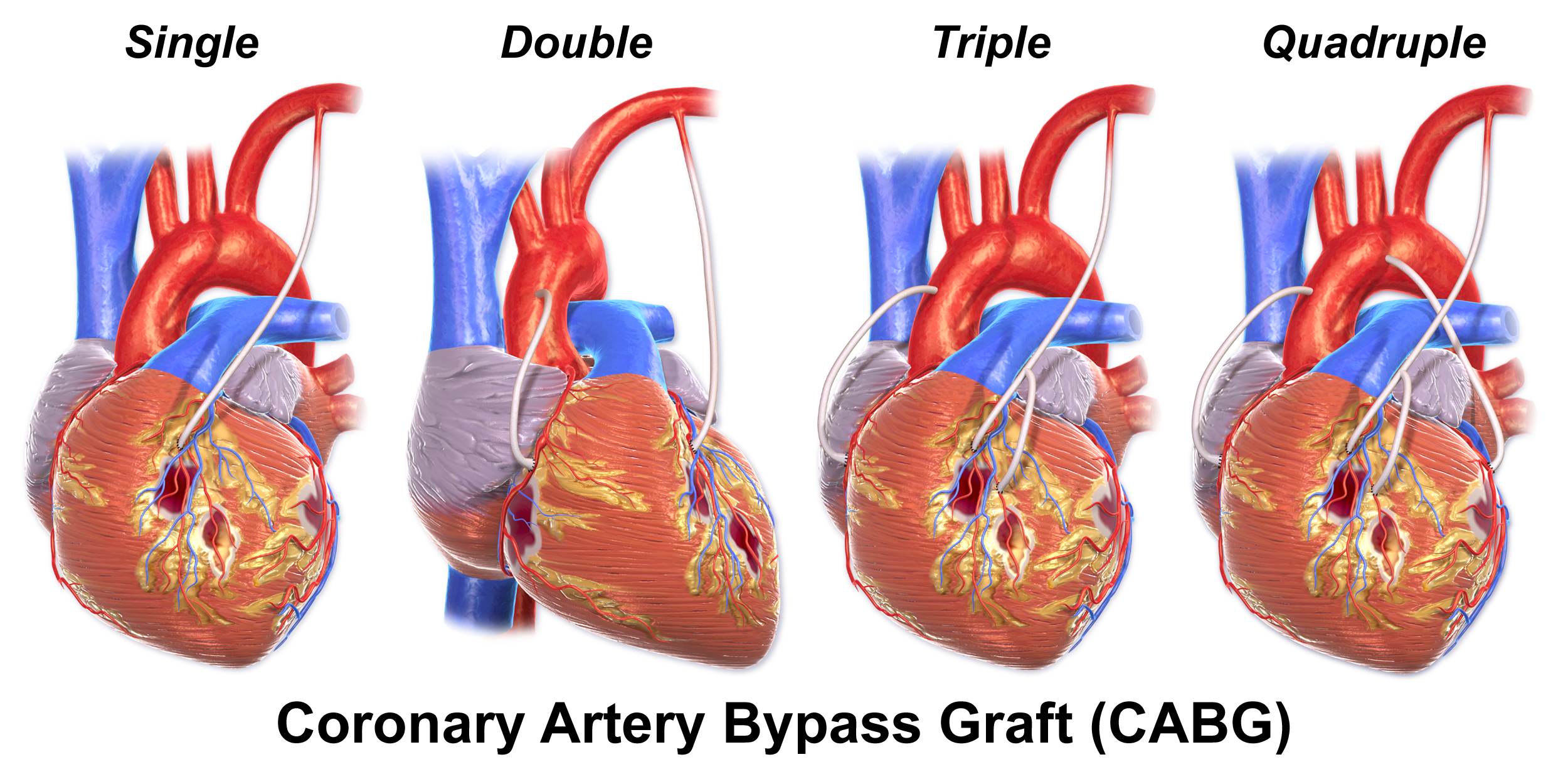
Illustration depicting single, double, triple, and quadruple bypass

Ganesh Kumar Mani hails from Delhi and did schooling at MEAHS School in the city to pass the higher secondary examination in 1964. Choosing medicine as his career, Mani graduated from the Maulana Azad Medical College, MBBS, in 1969 and secured the post graduate degree of MS in general surgery from the same institution in 1975. Subsequently, he joined the Christian Medical College and Hospital, Vellore, passed MCh in cardiothoracic surgery in 1979 and the next year, in 1980, passed MNAMS in cardiothoracic and vascular surgery from the National Academy of Medical Sciences.

Mani is reported to have performed 500 consecutive bypass surgeries with zero mortality rate, with an overall reduction in the morbidity rate of the hospital he worked for, down to one percent from the earlier 20 percent. He is considered as a pioneer of a technique known as Beating Heart Coronary Artery Bypass with autologous blood with minimal to nil usage of homologous blood transfusion, and is rated by many as one of the safest cardiac surgeons in India.

Ganesh Mani is married to Manju, the marriage solemnized on 7 July 1973 and the couple has two children. The family, together, looks after the management of Mani Heart Care. He lives in Greater Kailesh I and is also involved in social activities and community programmes there.

== Positions ==
Mani started his career as a faculty member at the Christian Medical College and Hospital, Vellore and moved as the Specialist Surgeon to the Indian Railways Southern Railway HQ Hospital in Perambur in the south Indian state of Tamil Nadu, in 1984. He worked there till 1989 when he returned to Delhi as the Chief Cardiac Surgeon and Director of Cardiac Surgery at the Batra Hospital and Medical Research Centre, a position he held till 1995. The next move was as the Senior Cardiothoracic Consultant of the Apollo Hospital, Indraprastha, a 700 bedded tertiary care hospital in the Indian capital, working there from 1996 to 2003. He has also worked as the visiting consultant at hospitals such as Saroj Hospital, Delhi (2001–2003), Gandhi Medical College, Bhopal (2003), Delhi Heart and Lung Institute (2003–2009), Golden Heart Institute of the Jaipur Golden Hospital (2005–2009), the Mool Chand Hospital, Delhi (2008–2009) and as the Director of the Pushpanjali Institute of Cardiac Sciences and Crosslay Remedies.

In 2013, Mani moved to Saket City Hospital, Delhi and is the chairman, Cardiothoracic Vascular Surgery, there. He is also the managing director of Mani Heart Care, a facility he founded in 1990.

Ganesh Mani is a former member of the executive council of the Delhi Medical Council (1998–2004), a former member of the Medical Advisory Board Chronic Care Foundation (2003–2010) and is the President of the Health Education And Research Trust, Delhi and a National Committee member of the Indian Healthcare Federation.

== Awards and recognitions ==
Mani has been honoured by many institutions and organizations. He was a member of the 9th Indian Scientific Expedition to Antarctica, in 1989–90. The Government of India, in 2013, conferred the civilian award of Padma Shri on Dr. Mani for his services to the field of medicine. Some of the other awards and honours received by Dr. Mani are:

- Principal Medal awarded - Railway Staff College Vadodra - 1983
- National Citizens Award – Government of India - 1992
- MAMC Alumnus Award - Maulana Azad Medical College Alumni Association - 1992
- National Excellence Award - 1996
- Life Time Achievement Award - WCCPGC – 2008
- Larsen and Toubro Award - Larsen and Toubro Medical Equipment Division - 1998
- IMA Dr. K. Sharan Cardiology Excellence Award - Indian Medical Association - 2011
- Life Time Achievement Award - Avvai Tamil Sangam, Noida - 2012
- IMA Lifetime Achievement Award - Indian Medical Association - 2002
- Rotary Appreciation Award - 2009
- DMA Chikitsa Ratan Award - 2012

== See also ==
- Apollo Hospital, Indraprastha
