= Kantilal Hastimal Sancheti =

Indian surgeon

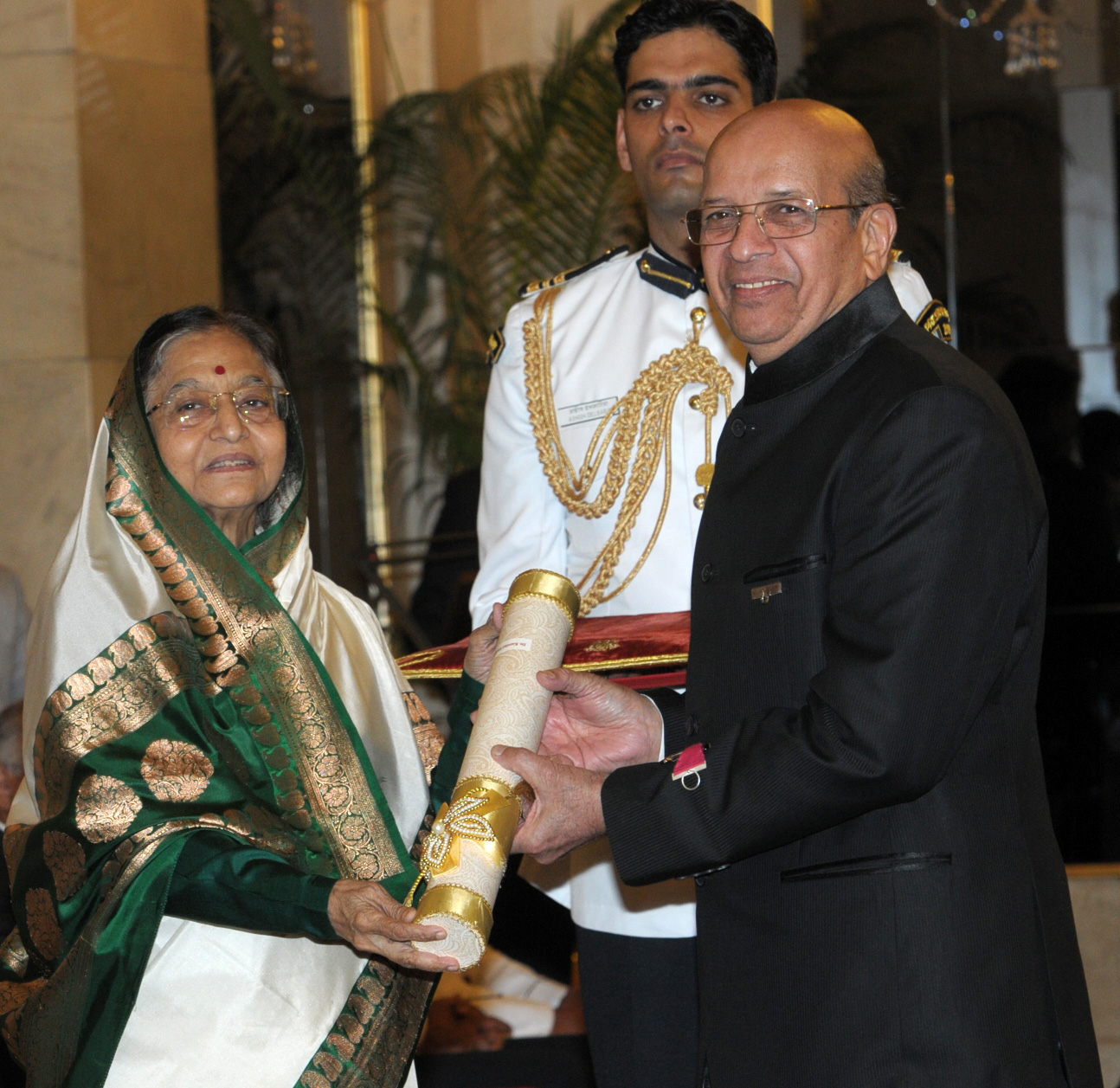

Kantilal H. Sancheti (born 24 July 1936) is an orthopaedic physician who invented India's first indigenous knee implant, the Indus Knee, and founder of Maharashtra's first orthopaedic dedicated specialty hospital.

== Early life ==
Sancheti was born in a Shewtamber Jain family. He holds the academic degrees and fellowships of M.S. (Ortho), F.R.C.S (Edinburgh) U.K., Ph.D (Ortho), F.I.C.S., F.A.C.S. (U.S.A.).

== Career ==
- Founder Director and Chief Orthopaedic Surgeon, at Sancheti Institute for Orthopaedics and Rehabilitation (SIOR). SIOR is a hospital specialising in joint replacement, traumatology, spinal surgery, paediatrics, orthopaedic, arthroscopy and sports injuries, hand and plastic surgery.
- Chairman, Post Graduate Institute of Orthopaedics, Post Graduate Institute for Physiotherapy and Hospital Management.
- Hon. Orthopaedic Surgeon to the Governor of Maharashtra and Indian Armed Forces.
- Hon. Professor, Examiner, and member of several high level core committees of various universities and healthcare-related committees of Government of Maharashtra and Medical Council of India.
- President Indian Orthopaedic Association and former President of Maharashtra Orthopaedic Association.
- Professor Emeritus in Orthopaedics, Chief Orthopaedic Surgeon, Sancheti Hospital & Centre for Joint Replacement Surgery, Pune.

== Awards ==
The Government of India presented him with its highest civilian awards: the Padma Shri in 1991, the Padma Bhushan in 2001 and the Padma Vibhushan in 2012.

- Maharana Mewar Award by the Maharana Mewar Foundation - 2003
- Fellowship of the Royal College of Surgeons, Edinburg, United Kingdom - 2004
- Lifetime Achievement award of The International Medical Integration Council from the Government of Maharashtra - 2004
- International Award for Medical Excellence by Harvard Medical School (USA) - 2005
- Jeevan Sadhana Gaurav Puraskar by Pune University 2010

He organized over 500 health camps for handicapped children all over India. Sancheti also acted in the capacity of hospital design consultant to over 120 hospitals in India.
