= Brihaspati Dev Triguna =

Indian alternative medicine practitioner (1920–2013)

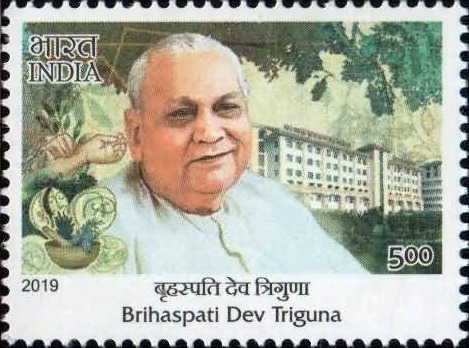
- Born: 1920; Bara Pind (Ram Bazar) Punjab India
- Died: 2013

Brihaspati Dev Triguna (1920–2013) was a Vaidya or Ayurveda practitioner and an expert in Pulse diagnosis (Nadi vaidyam in Ayurvedic terms). He completed his formal ayurvedic studies under the guidance of Rajvaidya Pandit Gokul Chand ji in his Gurukul from Ludhiana.

He was awarded the Padma Bhushan in 1992, followed by the Indian Government's second highest civilian award, the Padma Vibhushan Award in 2003.

== Career ==
Triguna was president of the All-India Ayurvedic Congress and held several government positions, including Director of the Central Council for Research on Ayurveda and chairman of the National Academy of Ayurveda. He was the personal physician for the President of India. He worked towards standardization of Ayurvedic medicines, certifications at the Ayurvedic colleges of India.

Triguna collaborated with Maharishi Mahesh Yogi and other Ayurvedic experts to develop Maharishi Ayurveda. His primary practice was in Sarai Kale Khan behind Delhi's Hazrat Nizamuddin Railway Station, although he travelled to many parts of the world, including Europe where he opened Ayurveda clinics. His travel in the U.S. included giving talks on Ayurveda at medical schools such as UCLA, Harvard, and Johns Hopkins School of Medicine.

In 2003, Triguna received the second highest civilian award given by Government of India, the Padma Vibhushan Award.

Vaidya Brihaspati Dev Triguna died on 1 January 2013 at his home in Sarai Kale Khan, Nizamuddin New Delhi. His sons Narendra Triguna and Vaidya Devendra Triguna carry on his practice at the same location.
