= Karnataka Medical College and Research Institute =

Medical school in Hubballi, India

Coordinates: 15.361789°N 75.130715°E

- Former name: Karnataka Institute of Medical Sciences
- Type: Public
- Established: August 1957; 69 years ago
- Affiliations: Rajiv Gandhi University of Health Sciences
- Director: Dr. Uday S. Bandhe
- Faculty: 334
- Students: UG–800; PG–103; Nursing–100; Paramedical–100
- Location: Hubballi, Karnataka, India
- Campus: 100 Acres; Urban
- Website: hubballikims.karnataka.gov.in hubballikims.karnataka.gov.in/english

Karnataka Medical College and Research Institute (KMCRI), colloquially known as KMC, is a medical school in Hubballi, Karnataka, India. It is affiliated to Rajiv Gandhi University of Health Sciences. It is one of the oldest tertiary healthcare centers and the largest multi-specialty hospital in North Karnataka. In June 1997, the then Karnataka Medical College was accorded autonomous status and became Karnataka Institute of Medical Sciences (KIMS), it was renamed to Karnataka Medical College and Research Institute in 2024.

== History ==
Karnataka Institute of Medical Sciences, Hubballi (KIMS, Hubballi), formerly known as Karnataka Medical College, Hubballi, was established in August 1957 and is one of Karnataka's oldest government medical colleges. The college was located in a building later known as J. G. Commerce College for the first year. The campus was subsequently shifted to the present location, which is 100 acres (0.40 km^{2}) of land on the Pune – Bangalore National Highway near Vidyanagar, Hubballi.

KIMS, Hubballi serves communities by providing tertiary health care services to the needy and developing the resources of health care providers.

The current objectives are:

- 1) providing comprehensive undergraduate and postgraduate medical and paramedical education and
- 2) developing facilities for:
  - research,
  - training,
  - screening,
  - diagnosis,
  - treatment,
  - rehabilitation,
  - palliative care and
  - preventive care

for society at large.

There has been steady progress in the facilities and the health care services available at the institute. The institute is equipped to provide some specialty services like:

- Cardiology,
- Nephrology,
- Endocrinology,
- Neurology,
- Neurosurgery,
- Urology,
- Plastic surgery and
- Pediatric surgery.

The Anti-Retroviral Treatment Center at KIMS, Hubballi, has been recognized and is being developed as the nodal center for North Karnataka and the surrounding region. The Government of Karnataka has provided the institute with a cardiac catheterization lab and has pledged to renew it as a Regional Cardiology Center. The institute has also been accorded the status of Institute of Excellence and recognized as a Training Center for WHO Fellowship. The addition of new blocks, such as the Trauma Care Center and Maternal & Child Health Center is expected to increase the popularity of the hospital in the region. Phototherapy, dermabrasion, and radio frequency have been newly added to the Department of Dermatology. The Karnataka Institute of Medical Sciences at Hubbali was selected by the Indian Council of Medical Research (ICMR), making the facility the only government-controlled body in Karnataka as a center of clinical trials. The center is among the handful of centers in the country that check the impact of any medicines or vaccines.

== Teaching affiliates ==
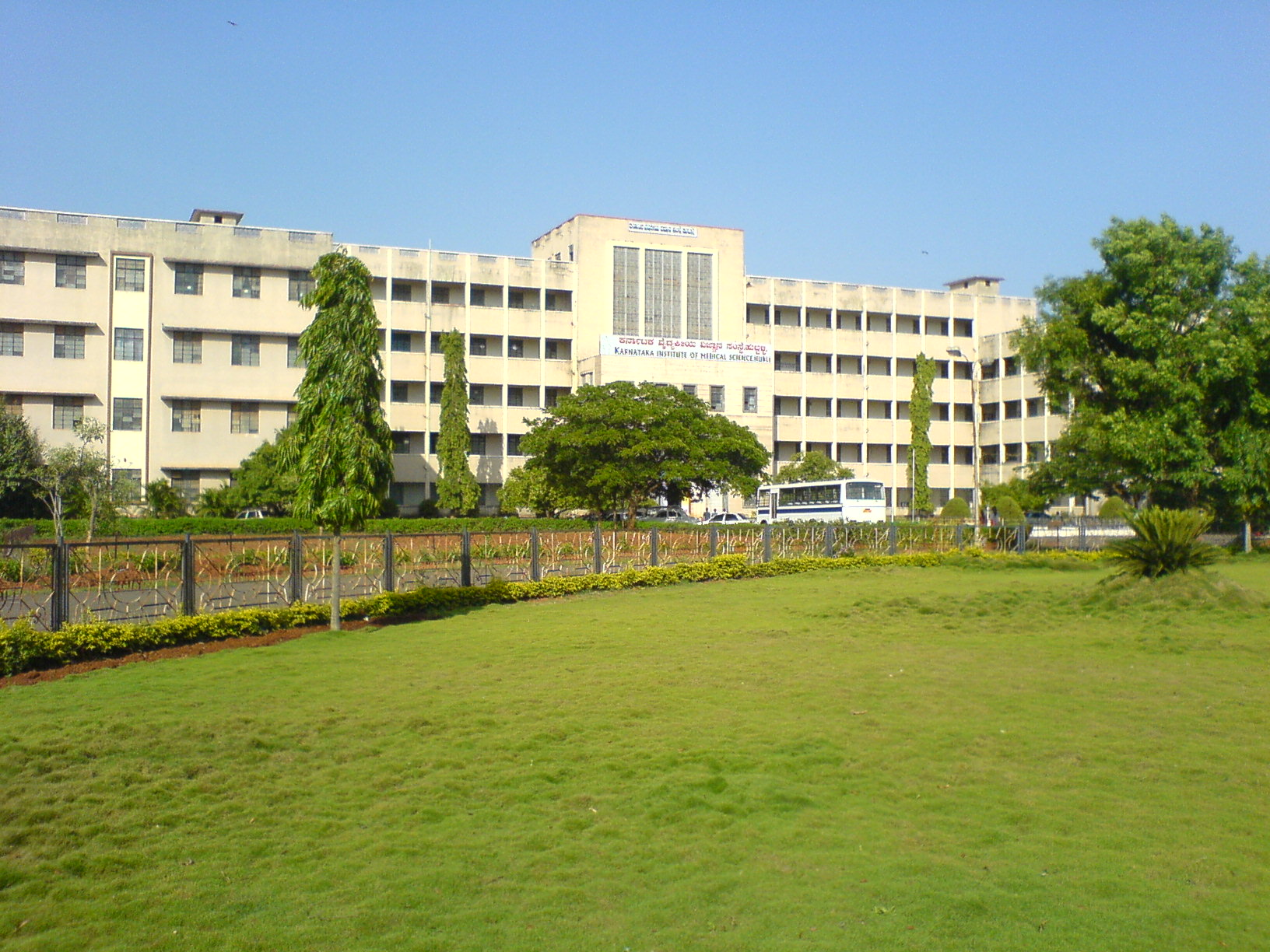
A view of KIMS from the Archana ladies hostel

- Karnataka Medical College and Research Institute, Hubballi Hospital, KMCRI Campus, Hubballi
- Dharwad Institute of Mental Health and Neurosciences, Dharwad
- Anti Retroviral Therapy Center, KMCRI Campus, Hubballi
- District Tuberculosis Center, KMCRI Campus, Hubballi
- Urban Leprosy Center, KMCRI Campus, Hubballi
- Urban Health Training Center, Old Hubballi
- Rural Health Training Center, Kundgol
- Primary Health Care Center, Kalghatgi
- Hubli Hospital for the Handicapped, Anandnagar, Hubballi
- KMCRI Life Line Blood Bank, KMCRI Campus, Hubballi
- Jaipur Center for Prosthetics, KMCRI Campus, Hubballi
- Railway Hospital, Hubballi
