= T. J. Cherian =

Indian surgeon

- Born: August 29, 1920; Kottarakkara, Kerala, India
- Died: March 6, 2006 (aged 85); Chennai, Tamil Nadu, India
- Resting place: St. George's Cathedral, Chennai
- Occupation: Cardiothoracic surgeon
- Awards: Padma Bhushan; Padma Shri; Fellow of the American College of Surgeons

Thayil John Cherian, popularly known as TJC, was a Malayali cardio-thoracic surgeon, from Kerala, India, known for his social commitment and compassionate approach. The government of India honoured him twice, first by awarding him the Padma Shri, in 1972 and, later in 1992, with the Padma Bhushan, the third highest civilian award, for his services to the field of Medicine.

== Life sketch ==
You wouldn't be able to afford my fees, Dr. Thayil used to jokingly tell the patients, if they pressed him to accept fees.

T. J. Cherian was born on 2 August 1920, in the Thayil family, an ancient family with roots all over the State, to John and Elizabeth, in the southern Kerala town of Kottarakkara, in India, as the eldest of the two sons and two daughters. He completed his schooling at the Madras Christian College School, Chennai and did his college studies at the Madras Christian College. Choosing medical career, he joined the Madras Medical College, in 1959, to secure his MBBS and specialised in cardio-vascular surgery in 1963 after which he went to New South wales, Australia to complete his residency where he registered as a medical practitioner. The next move was to Canada for further specialisation in general medicine to get his MD. He was also made a Fellow of the American College of Surgeons.

Cherian started his career at the Indian Railways when he joined them as a medical officer. He served at various railway hospitals in Shoranur, Pothanur, Trichy and Perambur, in Kerala and Tamil Nadu. He was the chief medical officer of the Southern Railway at the time of his retirement. Subsequently, he resumed practice the Vijaya Hospital. Chennai, only to move to the Devaki Hospital For a while, he was sidelined by health problems but was practicing at the Kalliappa Hospital at the time of his death.

Cherian, a bachelor throughout his life, died on 6 March 2006, at the age of 85, at Chennai, succumbing to the injuries sustained following a fall from the terrace of his apartment building. He was laid to rest, the next day, at the St. George's Cathedral Cemetery, Chennai.

== Death and the surrounding mystery ==
Official reports mention that the death of Cherian was due to head injuries suffered in a fall, death happening on the spot. The death occurred at the parking lot of his apartment complex at Abhiramapuram, in Chennai and his body was found on top of a parked car. Police investigations revealed that Cherian went up to the terrace of the building from where the fall occurred. However, the reason for the suicide is still unknown as it is reported that the doctor had no known enemies and had gone through the daily routine, on the day of his death, with no apparent deviations. No one's presence was also reported at the terrace and the police closed the matter as a case of suicide.

== Legacy ==
It is reported that Cherian would refuse doctor's fees if he found that the patient came from a poor background. He is remembered by many as one of the old school medical doctors who always maintained a personal relationship with their patients.

== Awards and recognitions ==
- Padma Bhushan - Government of India - 1992
- Padma Shri - Government of India - 1972
- Fellow of the American College of Surgeons

Other than the above honours, he was also given an emerald-studded ring by Sathya Sai Baba.
