= Buimerc India Foundation =

- Abbreviation: BIF
- Formation: 2007
- Founder: R. Balachandran; Siddharth Balachandran
- Type: Nonprofit
- Registration no.: KL/2020/0262828
- Headquarters: Kochi, Kerala, India
- Region served: India
- Chairman and Managing Trustee: R. Balachandran
- Key people: Sabita Varma Balachandran (Trustee – Director, Gender Inclusivity & Empowerment); Siddharth Balachandran (Co-chairman & Trustee); Shiv Siddharth (Trustee); CA V. Parameswaran (Trustee)
- Parent organization: Buimerc Corporation

Buimerc India Foundation (BIF) is a non-profit organization headquartered in Kochi, Kerala, India. Established in 2007 as the philanthropic division of the Buimerc Corporation, the foundation operates programs in healthcare, education, environmental conservation, and animal welfare. Its activities include geriatric care, disability support, and projects aimed at preserving Indian cultural heritage.

== History ==
BIF was founded in 2007 by R. Balachandran and Siddharth Balachandran. Initially focused on education and social welfare in under-resourced areas, the organization expanded its scope by 2022. This expansion included animal welfare, environmental conservation, geriatric care, and disability support It also manages projects for the preservation of arts and heritage, alongside empowerment programs for women and youth in rural and tribal communities.

== Areas of work ==
=== Education and environment ===
In the education sector, BIF funds school infrastructure development, vocational training, and the renovation of Anganwadi centres. The foundation also maintains a scholarship program for students in various Indian states.

The foundation's environmental initiatives focus on reforestation and coastal conservation. In 2025, BIF began a three-year partnership with the M. S. Swaminathan Research Foundation to plant 100,000 mangrove saplings in the Ernakulam and Alleppey districts. In Wayanad, the foundation collaborated with Forest First Samithi to remove invasive species, such as Senna and Lantana, and reintroduce rare, endemic, and threatened (RET) plant species. Other projects include habitat restoration for rescued elephants in Mathura with Wildlife SOS and bird conservation awareness programs for students in partnership with the Bombay Natural History Society and the Tropical Institute of Ecological Sciences (TIES).

=== Healthcare and social welfare ===
BIF's healthcare operations focus on palliative and pediatric care through various partnerships. It works with Arike on home-based palliative care for the elderly, and with Aster Medcity's ASK Foundation and Solace on pediatric oncology support. The foundation also funds kidney dialysis through Alpha Hospice and supports the Akshaya Trust in the rehabilitation of destitute individuals in Madurai.

In assistive technology, the foundation partnered with the VIT-AP Technology Business Incubation Foundation on the "POHA" project to develop prosthetic devices for lower-limb amputees. Other social welfare activities include sports training for children with cerebral palsy and various disability support services.

=== Cultural preservation ===
The foundation funds the preservation of traditional Indian arts and heritage. Notable projects include support for Kalaripayattu and a partnership with Kanchi University to upgrade the Shilpa Pathasala, a school dedicated to traditional Vastu and temple sculpting.
