= Sampat Shivangi =

Indian-born American physician (1940–2025)

- Born: 1940; Athani, Bombay Presidency, British India
- Died: 10 February 2025 (aged 84)
- Education: Karnataka Medical College; Kasturba Medical College, Manipal; WashU Medicine
- Occupation: Physician
- Awards: Pravasi Bharatiya Samman (2017)

Sampat Shivangi (1940 – 10 February 2025) was an Indian-born American physician. Shivangi was the president of Indian American Forum for Political Education. He served the Board for the Department of Mental Health in Mississippi for several years. Shivangi was the onetime president-elect of the American Association of Physicians of Indian Origin. Shivangi received several awards for his work. The most notable award he received was the Pravasi Bharatiya Samman award from the President of India Pranab Mukherjee in Bengaluru on the Pravasi Bharatiya Divas.

== Background ==
Sampat Shivangi was born in the town of Athani, now in Karnataka State, India. He joined Kasturba Medical College in Manipal, India where he received his under Grad in medicine M.B.B.S. He later attended Karnataka Medical College in Hubli, where he received his M.D and D.G.O post-graduate degrees in Medicine.

Shivangi died on 11 February 2025, at the age of 88.

== Career ==
Sampat Shivangi completed his Doctor of Medicine (MD) in Ob-Gyn and migrated to the United States in 1976. Later, he completed a fellowship from Washington University School of Medicine, St. Louis, Missouri. Shivangi served as the Advisor to the US Secretary of Health and Human Services from 2005 to 2008. He was the founding president of the American Association of Physicians of Indian Origin in Mississippi and was a president and chair of the India Association of Mississippi.

He earlier served on the Mississippi State Board of Health. Shivangi was honored for his role as adviser to the United States Department of Health and Human Services in the George W. Bush administration and chairmanship of Mississippi State Board of Mental Health.

Shivangi also served as a house delegate in American Medical Association in Chicago. He worked on India Civil Nuclear treaty and US India defense treaty that was passed in US Congress and signed by US-President George W. Bush. He attended numerous National GOP Conventions as a Delegate.

The state of Mississippi also honored Shivangi by naming a lane after him in one of the premier medical facilities at Boswell Regional Medical Center. He joined Executive Advisory Board of the Washington, DC–based think tank International Leaders Summit. He advocated for the Green card reforms in the United States for physicians, engineers, teachers, nurses, and medical professionals.

== Awards and achievements ==
- 2008: Ellis Island Medal of Honor
- 2017: Person of the Year by the Indian American Republican Committee
- 2017: Pravasi Bharatiya Diwas Sanman award

== See also ==
- American Association of Physicians of Indian Origin
- Sanjiv Chopra
- Ami Bera
- Balamurali Ambati
