= VKR =

VKR may refer to:

- Vertical knee raise, a muscle device for exercising the core strength area of the abdominal muscles
- Venkatnagar railway station, the station code VKR

== People ==
- Venugopal K.R., the former Vice-Chancellor of Bangalore University
- V. K. Ramasamy (actor), an Indian actor, comedian and producer
- VKR Pillai, an Indian businessman
