= Shamim Parkar Khan =

Tanzanian politician and public servant

- Born: Tanzania
- Occupations: Politician, public servant
- Known for: Tanzanian Deputy Minister; community advocacy
- Awards: Pravasi Bharatiya Samman (2019)

Shamim Parkar Khan (also known as Mama Shamim) is a Tanzanian politician and public servant. She is a former Member of Parliament and served as a Deputy Minister in several Tanzanian government ministries. In 2019, she was awarded the Pravasi Bharatiya Samman, the highest honour for overseas Indians, for her public service.

== Political career ==
Khan was elected to the Parliament of Tanzania in 1985 as the representative for Morogoro. She was the first woman to contest and win that seat, which she held for ten years. She has held several deputy ministerial positions, including Deputy Minister for Trade and Industry and Deputy Minister for Community Development, Gender, and Children.

== Institutional and community roles ==
Khan serves as the Chancellor of the International Medical and Technological University (IMTU) in Dar es Salaam. She is the board chairperson of Global Impact Transformation, a non-governmental organization focused on social development. Khan serves as the Chairperson of the Tanzania Women Interfaith Network and is a member of the Interreligious Council for Peace Tanzania.

== Recognition ==
In January 2019, Khan was conferred the Pravasi Bharatiya Samman by the Government of India. The award was presented at the 15th Pravasi Bharatiya Divas convention in Varanasi.

== See also ==
- Indians in Tanzania
- Pravasi Bharatiya Samman
