= Malini Ranganathan =

- Education: Sir J.J. School of Art (BFA); European University (PhD)
- Occupations: Kathak exponent, educational scientist
- Notable work: Founder of Bindi Association
- Honors: Pravasi Bharatiya Samman (2019); Chevalier de l'Ordre des Arts et des Lettres (2024)

Malini Ranganathan is an Indian-born French Kathak exponent, choreographer, and educational scientist. She is based in Nantes, France, and is known for her work in promoting Indian classical dance and Indo-French cultural exchange.

In 2019, she received the Pravasi Bharatiya Samman, the highest honor conferred by the Government of India on overseas Indians.

== Early life and education ==
Ranganathan moved to France in 1983.

She holds a degree in textile design from the Sir J.J. School of Art in Mumbai. In France, she earned an MPhil and a PhD in Educational Science from the European University, specializing in cross-cultural didactics.

== Career ==
Ranganathan has performed Kathak globally and founded the Bindi association in 1996 to promote Indian arts in France. She has curated major festivals including the Summer Festival of Nantes and Namaste France.

In academia, she is a professor of Humanities and Educational Science at ISG in Nantes.

== Awards ==
- Pravasi Bharatiya Samman (2019)
- Chevalier de l'Ordre des Arts et des Lettres (2024)
- Medal of Excellence (2019), City of Nantes
