= Sant Singh Virmani =

US-based Indian plant breeder

- Born: India
- Occupation: Plant breeder
- Known for: Rice research
- Awards: Padma Shri; International Service in Crop Science Award; TWAS Prize; Pravasi Bharatiya Samman; Netlink Foundation Award

Sant Singh Virmani is a US-based Indian plant breeder, rice scientist and a former principal scientist at the International Rice Research Institute (IRRI). The Government of India honoured him with the fourth highest civilian honour of the Padma Shri, in 2008, for his contributions to agricultural science.

== Work and achievements ==
Virmani served IRRI from 1979 to 2005 and retired from its service as the deputy head of the Plant Breeding, Genetics and Biochemistry Division.

He is an elected Fellow of the American Association for the Advancement of Science (AAAS) and a recipient of the International Service in Crop Science Award from the Crop Science Society of America (CSSA). He received the TWAS Prize in 2000 followed by the Pravasi Bharatiya Samman of the Ministry of Overseas Indian Affairs, Government of India in 2003. A few months later, Netlink Foundation honoured him for his service to humanity in combating hunger and poverty around the world with a plaque.

== See also ==
- International Rice Research Institute
