= Regency Medical Centre =

Regency Medical Centre, Dar es Salaam, Tanzania
- Aerial View of Regency Medical Centre, Dar es Salaam

Geography
- Location: Aly Khan Road, Upanga, Dar es Salaam, Tanzania
- Coordinates: 6°48′46.7″S 39°16′45.3″E

Organisation
- Care system: Private

Services
- Emergency department: Yes

History
- Founded: 1999

Links
- Website: regencymedicalcentre.com
- Lists: Hospitals in Tanzania

Regency Medical Centre is a multi-specialty hospital located on Aly Khan Road, in Dar es Salaam, Tanzania. Established in 1999, the hospital was founded by Dr. Rajni Kanabar, who was also the hospital's Chairman and the convener of the Tanzania Babies Heart Project till 25 June 2019.
