= Transworld Group (shipping and logistics company) =

UAE-based shipping company

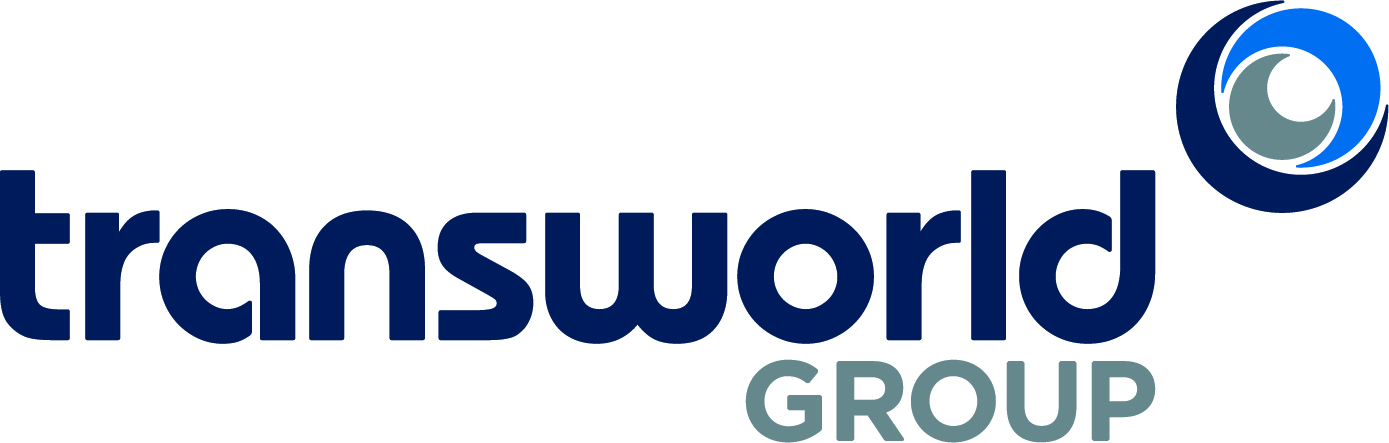

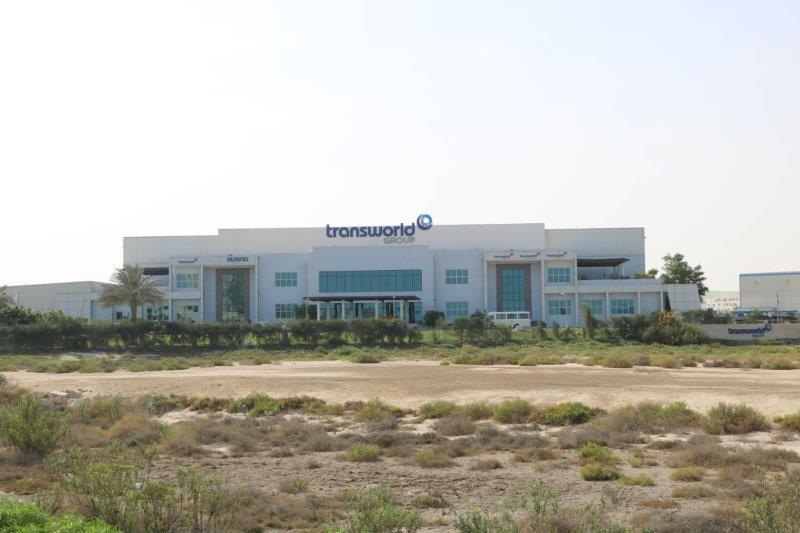
- Type: Private Limited Company
- Industry: Shipping; Logistics
- Founded: 1977; 49 years ago
- Founder: R. Sivaswamy
- Headquarters: Dubai, United Arab Emirates
- Area served: Worldwide
- Key people: Ramakrishnan Sivaswamy Iyer (Chairman); Ritesh S. Ramakrishnan (Managing Director); Geeta Ramakrishnan (Director of Administration & HR); Anisha Ramakrishnan (Director)
- Services: Vessel owning, commercial jets, warehousing, shipping and logistics
- Revenue: $700 million (2015)
- Number of employees: 1,000+ (2024)
- Website: www.transworld.com

Transworld Group is a multinational shipping and logistics company, based in Dubai, United Arab Emirates. It has business interests in shipping and logistics, aviation, supply chain management, and food processing, among others. It was established in 1977 by R. Sivaswamy, the company has offices in the United Arab Emirates, Saudi Arabia, Oman, Sri Lanka, and multiple cities in India.

== History ==
Transworld Group of Companies was established in 1977 by R. Sivaswamy as a shipping company in Mumbai. In 1989, the company came under the leadership of chairman Ramesh Ramakrishnan and later expanded its operations into shipping, marine and logistics in the Indian subcontinent and the Gulf region.

== Operations ==
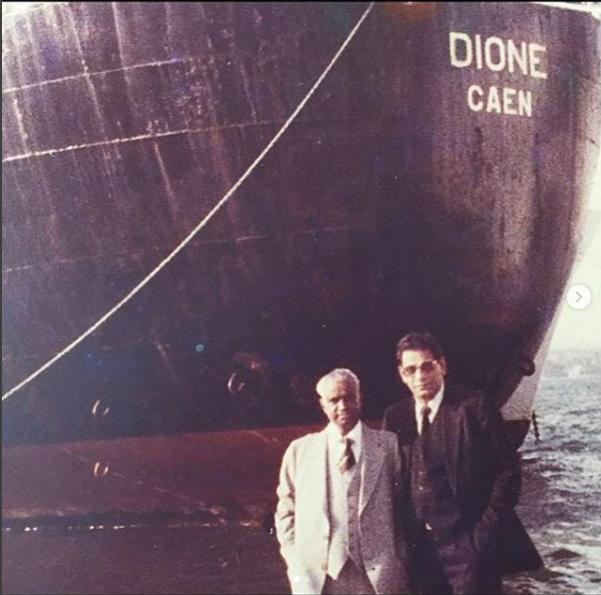
R. Sivaswamy with Transworld Group's first vessel, the Khaleej Express.

=== Shipping and logistics ===
The company provides shipping and multimodal logistics services. Its shipping services include containerized, bulk, and tanker cargo transportation. The group's logistics services include third-party logistics, freight forwarding, cold chain logistics, and warehousing.

In 2022, Transworld Group entered the liquid bulk segment with the purchase of two vessels of 74,000 DWT, flying the Panama flag.

Between 2021-24, Transworld Group provided logistics services in the construction of the BAPS Hindu Mandir in Abu Dhabi.

In 2023, Transworld Group signed an agreement with DP World's Jebel Ali Free Zone (Jafza) for the construction of a 50,000+ square meters, dry and temperature-controlled distribution center in Jafza, which is expected to be completed by 2025.

In 2024, Transworld Group signed a ₹2,000 crore MoU to establish ship leasing and aircraft leasing activities at GIFT IFSC, Gujarat.

=== Aviation ===
In 2023, Transworld Group expanded into the aviation sector with its luxury private jet charter service, Airavat, operating in the Middle East, Europe, and Asia. In 2024, Transworld Group entered into a joint venture with former SpiceJet COO Arun Kashyap's Sirius India Airlines to begin operations in India.

=== Food processing ===
In 2024, Transworld Group established its food processing and agri-logistics arm called Transgreen.

=== Recruitment ===
In 2023, Transworld Group partnered with DP World's World Security to establish World People Solutions, which recruits workers from India for job opportunities overseas.

=== Film production ===
In 2024, Ramesh S. Ramakrishnan and Ritesh S. Ramakrishnan of Transworld Group, along with Emirati filmmaker Shihan Shoukath, launched a film production house called Reel World Entertainment.

=== Others ===
Transworld Group has also developed real estate and infrastructure projects in India and the UAE.

== See also ==
- List of largest container shipping companies
