= Panchapakesa Jayaraman =

Indian writer and scholar

- Born: June 20, 1932; India
- Died: November 28, 2023 (aged 91)
- Occupations: Writer; Scholar
- Awards: Padma Shri; Pravasi Bharatiya Samman; AAC Hall of Fame

Panchapakesa Jayaraman is an Indian writer, scholar, vedic priest and a former executive director of the Bharatiya Vidya Bhavan, USA. He is a known academic in Vedic Studies and Indian philosophy. He has edited six and authored 12 books including, Subrahmaṇya Bhāratī: Bhārata sapūta, published in 1967 by Kshitija Prakāśana.

Jayaraman served as a faculty member in various Indian academic institutions since 1948 before moving to US and founded the Institute of Indian Culture, New York, as a branch of the Bharatiya Vidya Bhavan in 1980. He held the post of the executive director of the organization till his retirement in 2007 and continues his association with the organization as an honorary consultant. He headed the Department of Indian Languages at the Reserve Bank of India for sixteen years and has presented several literary programs in All India Radio and Doordarshan. He was a delegate at the Seminar on Confronting Islamophobia, conducted by the United Nations in Geneva on 7 December 2004 where he delivered a keynote address.

Jayaraman received the Pravasi Bharatiya Samman from the Ministry of Overseas Indian Affairs of the Government of India in 2007. The Government of India followed it up with the fourth highest civilian honour of the Padma Shri, in 2009, for his contributions to Literature and Education and the Asian American Coalition USA (AAC) inducted him into their Hall of Fame in 2011.

== See also ==
- Bharatiya Vidya Bhavan
