= P. V. Radhakrishna Pillai =

Indian engineer

- Born: Plavalil Kizhakkethil Vasudevan Radhakrishna Pillai; Mavelikara, Kerala, India
- Occupation: Engineer

P.V.Radhakrishna Pillai or Plavalil Kizhakkethil Vasudevan Radhakrishna Pillai is an Indian engineer based in Bahrain. He was born in Mavelikara, in Alappuzha district Kerala of India.

He has been awarded the Pravasi Bharatiya Samman by President of India Pratibha Patil in January 2012 for his contributions among non residence Indian. He held the positions of President, Bahrain Keraleeya Samajam, Chairman Indian School, Bahrain 2002–2008, President Surya Bahrain chapter.

He is working as a senior engineer in the ministry of electricity and water of the Kingdom of Bahrain but had earlier served in the Kerala State Electricity Board.

He is the president of Bahrain Keraleeya Samajam, which one of the biggest expatriate communities in the Kingdom of Bahrain.

== Award ==
Year	Name	Country of residence	Field of Merit	Notes
2012	Pravasi Bharatiya Samman	Bahrain	Social work	

== Achievements ==
2014 The Outstanding Alumnus by Shashi Tharoor
