= J. R. Gangaramani =

Indian businessman

- Born: Mumbai, Maharashtra, India
- Occupation: Businessperson
- Spouse: Usha
- Children: Shalini; Natasha; Heera
- Awards: Padma Shri; Pravasi Bharatiya Samman; Pazhassiraja Puraskar (Vyavasaya Ratna); Global Indian Achiever of the Year
- Website: Official web site

Jawaharlal R. Gangaramani, is an Indian businessperson and the Partner of Al Fara'a Group which has presence in the UAE, Saudi Arabia & Oman. In 2010, the Government of India awarded him with the Padma Shri, India's fourth highest civilian award, for his services to the field of social work.

== Life ==
Jawaharlal Gangaramani was born in a sindhi family in Mumbai. After graduating in Structural Engineering from Bombay University in 1971 and starting his career in Mumbai, he moved to Dubai, in 1974, to work as an engineer in a local construction company and got involved in the construction of Dubai World Trade Centre.

In 1980, he split with his employer and joined Al Fara'a General Contracting Company, along with founder Adel Saleh, a UAE businessperson. The company, has since, grown into a conglomerate, Al Fara'a Group, with 11 companies and 18,000 employees under its umbrella, and presence in the UAE, Saudi Arabia and Oman. Al Fara'a General Contracting has taken up a new name, Al Fara'a General Constructions, and remains the flagship company of the group. The group has interests in construction, real estate, infrastructure, interiors and education.

Gangaramani was listed by the Arabian Business.com as 45th among most powerful Indians in the Persian Gulf region. Forbes Middle East listed him as the 21st among top 100 Indian leaders in the region. He lives in the UAE with his wife, Usha and three daughters, Shalini, Natasha and Heera. He is also counted among the richest Indian in the Persian Gulf, Rediff.com placing him at 18th position.

== Social activities ==
Gangaramani's contributions to the society have been widely reported in the media and generally acknowledged by public institutions. He has established two institutions, Al Fara'a Foundation and R. P. Gangaramani Charitable Trust, to channel his charity activities.

Gangaramani supports many non-governmental organisations such as Special Care Centre in Abu Dhabi, the Hope Centre in Al Ain and Zayed Higher Organisation for Humanitarian Care, Special Needs and Minor Affairs, involved in the education and personal development of under-privileged children. He also supports Deepalaya, Children's Rights in India (CRY), Oxfam India and Jeev Sewa Sansthan, NGO s based in Mumbai, and engaged in welfare activities related orphan children.

On the education front, Gangaramani has recently entered into an agreement with the Ministry of Higher Education and Scientific Research, UAE to support a three-year integrated programme for the promotion and development of emaratis. He supports a training centre in Al Ain, which provides vocational training to unskilled labourers.

Al Fara'a Group, under Gangaramani, was one of the first business groups in the UAE to offer support to the returning labourers during the Amnesty in 2012. He has also contributed for the construction of the headquarters for Bahrain Keraleeya Samajam (Association of Bahrain Keralites).

== Awards and recognitions ==
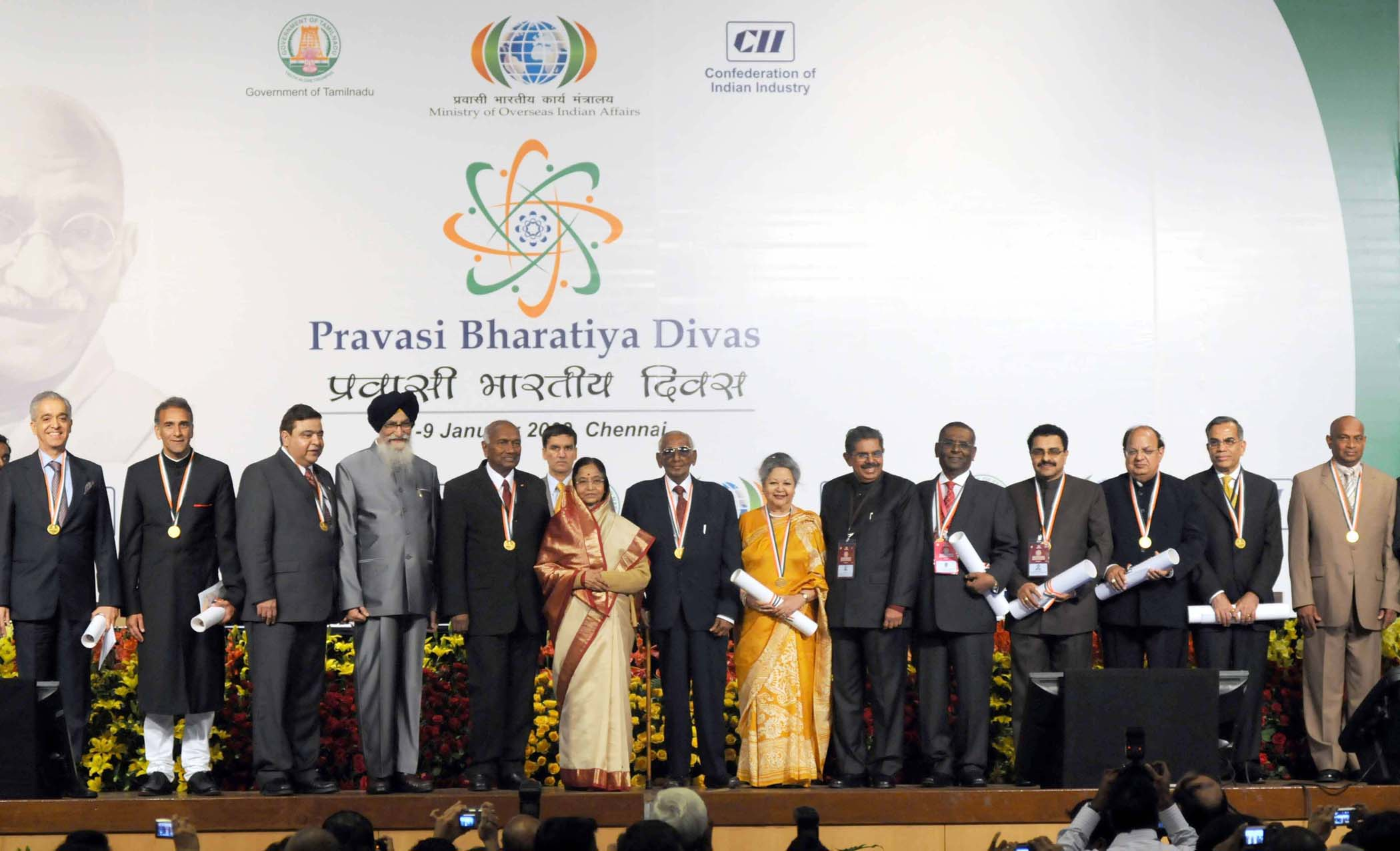
Gangaramani (1st from left) stands with others along with President of India at Pravasi Bharatiya Samman ceremony

- Padma Shri – Government of India – 2010
- Pravasi Bharatiya Samman – Government of India – 2009
- Pazhassiraja Puraskar (Vyavasaya Ratna)- Government of Maharashtra – 2011
- Global Indian Achiever of the Year – Construction Week India – 2012
- Honoris Causa Doctorate – University of Georgia –
