= Harry Harinath =

Gorur Krishna "Harry" Harinath OAM (1944–2023) was an Indian-born Australian cricket administrator.

== Biography ==
Harinath was born in India. He was educated at Aliya High School for Boys in Hyderabad. Later, he earned a medical degree from Osmania University. In 1971, he migrated to Australia.

Initially residing in Tasmania, Harinath later moved to Sydney, where he attended the University of Sydney and worked part-time, including as a dishwasher. His involvement in cricket began through a friendship with former Pakistani cricketer Sadiq Mohammad, leading to Harinath's participation in local cricket clubs.

His career in cricket administration began with his appointment at Balmain Cricket Club (now Sydney Cricket Club), where he served first as team doctor and then as club president. In May 2008, he became the chairman of Cricket New South Wales. During his tenure, Harinath oversaw major funding initiatives for cricket development, including projects such as the renovation of Drummoyne Oval and the establishment of a new facility at Blacktown International Sportspark. He also served as a board member of Cricket Australia.

In 2009, in recognition of his contributions to cricket and community service, Harinath was awarded the Order of Australia medal.

In 2007, Harinath received Pravasi Bharatiya Samman award from President of India.
