= Archana Sharma (physicist) =

Indian physicist

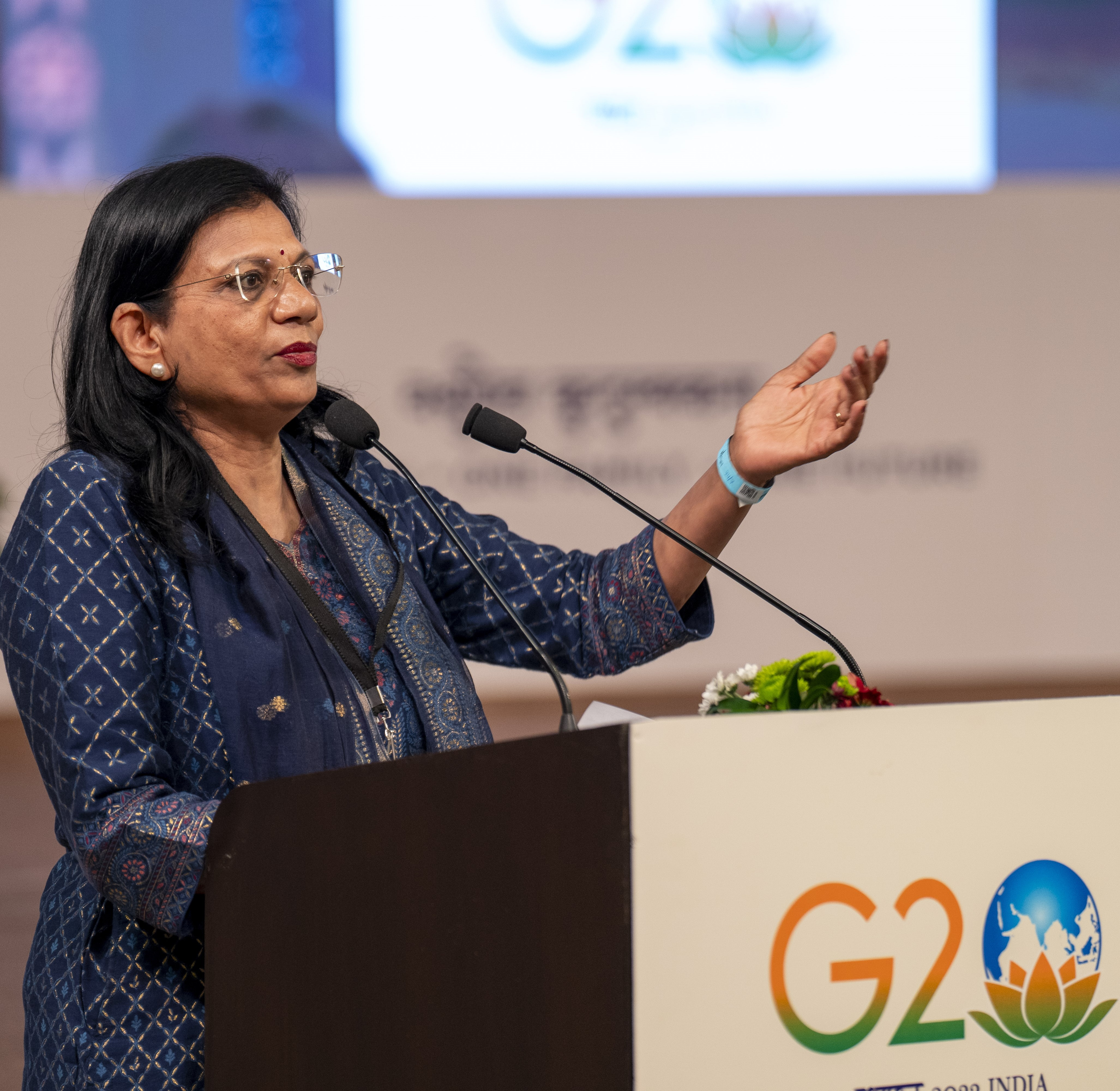
Archana Sharma at G20-Science20 Summit in Coimbatore, July 2023.

Archana Sharma is a distinguished Indian physicist and senior scientist at the CERN in Geneva, Switzerland. Her research focuses on high energy physics. She is internationally recognized for her work in instrumentation and gaseous detectors, specifically for her pioneering work on micro-pattern gaseous detectors. She received the Pravasi Bharatiya Samman Award in 2023 for her contribution in science and technology.

== Early life and education ==
Sharma was born to a middle-class family in Aligarh and raised in Jhansi, Uttar Pradesh. Both of her parents were teachers––her father taught mechanical engineering, and her mother taught economics and geography.

Sharma studied physics at Banaras Hindu University as an undergraduate student and received her masters in nuclear physics from the same university in 1982. In 1989, she received her PhD in experimental particle physics from Delhi University. Sharma earned a second doctorate degree from the University of Geneva in 1996 and an executive MBA degree from the International University in Geneva in 2001.

== Career ==
Sharma's involvement at CERN began in 1987 when she won a three-year fellowship to conduct research in the detector development group led by Georges Charpak. After finishing her first PhD in Delhi, Sharma moved to Geneva with her family in 1989 to conduct her post-doctoral research in gaseous detectors, through which she realized her lack of expertise in instrumentation and thus decided to pursue a second PhD at the University of Geneva.

After finishing her second PhD, Sharma held positions at the GSI-Darmstadt in Germany and the University of Maryland, College Park. Since 2001, she has worked at CERN on the Compact Muon Solenoid (CMS) experiment, designing high-efficiency detectors to facilitate the detection of the Higgs-Boson particle. She has mentored around 20 PhD students during her time at CERN and has authored or co-authored over 800 publications.

== Research ==
Sharma is best known for her work in gaseous detectors, through which she contributed to the discovery of the Higgs boson. She works at the CMS experiment in the Large Hadron Collider, developing a new muon system called GEM (Gas Electron Multiplier), which can detect muons in the outermost layer of the CMS. Detecting a muon can confirm the production of a Higgs boson, and the CMS is also important in studying other dimensions, background radiation, and the components of dark matter. Sharma is also known as a pioneer for her work on wire chambers, resistive plate chambers, and micro-pattern gaseous detectors, all of which laid the foundations for her larger work in the CMS experiment.

=== Select publications ===
- A. Sharma, Detection of single electrons with a GEM. Nuclear Instruments and Methods in Physics Research Section A: Accelerators, Spectrometers, Detectors and Associated Equipment 471, 136–139 (2001).
- A. Sharma, 3D simulation of charge transfer in a Gas Electron Multiplier (GEM) and comparison to experiment. Nuclear Instruments and Methods in Physics Research Section A: Accelerators, Spectrometers, Detectors and Associated Equipment 454, 267–271 (2000).
- A. Shah, A. Sharma, A. Kumar, J. Merlin, Md. Naimuddin, Impact of single-mask hole asymmetry on the properties of GEM detectors. Nuclear Instruments and Methods in Physics Research Section A: Accelerators, Spectrometers, Detectors and Associated Equipment 936, 459–461 (2019).
- S. Mukherjee, A. Sharma, S. Sodaye, A. Goswami, B. S. Tomar, INCOMPLETE FUSION IN THE EXCITATION FUNCTIONS OF 12C + 115In REACTIONS AT 4–7 MeV/NUCLEON. Int. J. Mod. Phys. E 15, 237–245 (2006).
- C. Richter, et al., On the efficient electron transfer through GEM. Nuclear Instruments and Methods in Physics Research Section A: Accelerators, Spectrometers, Detectors and Associated Equipment 478, 538–558 (2002).
- F. Sauli, A. Sharma, Micro-Pattern Gaseous Detectors. Annu. Rev. Nucl. Part. Sci. 49, 341–388 (1999).
