= Rajni Kanabar =

Tanzanian doctor and philanthropist (1940–2019)

- Born: 9 November 1940; Mwanza, Tanganyika Territory
- Died: 25 June 2019 (aged 78); Dallas, Texas, US
- Education: M.B.B.S. (India), D.C.H. (Ireland)
- Occupations: Founder of Regency Medical Centre, Dar es Salaam & Founder of Tanzania Heart Babies Project
- Known for: Community Service, Philanthropy
- Spouse: Sarla Kanabar
- Awards: Pravasi Bharatiya Samman-2010, PBS Medal by High Commission of India in Tanzania - 2013, Order of the United Republic of Tanzania - 2014

Rajni Kanabar (9 November 1940 – 25 June 2019) was an M.B.B.S. doctor and philanthropist belonging to the third generation of an Indian-origin family in Tanzania. He was the founder-chairman of Regency Medical Centre in Dar es Salaam, and the initiator-convenor of the Tanzania Heart Babies Project, which he established in the year 1979. Born in Mwanza, he was presented with the Pravasi Bharatiya Samman Award as a person of Indian origin, from the Government of India in 2010, for facilitating the surgeries of children in Tanzania suffering from congenital heart diseases. He also received the PBS Award Label from the High Commission of India in Tanzania in 2013, and the Order of the United Republic of Tanzania Medal in 2014.

== Career ==
Dr. Rajni Kanabar completed his M.B.B.S. education from B.J. Medical College in Ahmedabad. As a practicing physician in Tanzania, he observed a lack of infrastructure and medical facilities for children suffering from congenital heart diseases. In order to aid the timely treatment for these children, he founded the Tanzania Heart Babies Project in 1979 with the support of the Tanzanian Government’s Ministry of Health and the Lions Club of Dar es Salaam. Through this project, he facilitated surgeries of children from Tanzania, suffering from repairable congenital or rheumatic heart defect, at highly subsidized rates, both, in India and Tanzania. In 1999, he established the Regency Medical Centre, a private hospital, in Dar es Salaam. During his role as the hospital's chairman, Dr. Rajni Kanabar collaborated with a number of state-of-the-art hospitals in India such as Narayana Hrudayalaya Heart Institute, Bangalore, Sathya Sai Heart Institute, Andhra Pradesh, Fortis Escort Heart Institute, New Delhi and Sri Sathya Sai Hospital, Rajkot to conduct these heart surgeries. Until 2016, 3600 children suffering from congenital heart disease have successfully been treated under the Tanzania Heart Babies Project at various Indian hospitals.

His was also instrumental in conducting of free diabetes screening camps, orthopaedic hip and knee replacement camps and free eye screening camp at the Regency Medical Centre, throughout his tenure. He also played a key role in introducing an advanced laparoscopic surgery program to the country, thus, making Regency Medical Centre the first hospital in Tanzania that deployed laparoscopy procedure for surgeries. Under his leadership, Regency Medical Centre has also provided 59,000 haemodialysis sessions at subsidized rates.

== Awards and recognition ==
Dr. Rajni Kanabar was honored with the Pravasi Bharatiya Samaan Award as a person of Indian origin, by the former President of India, Pratibha Patil at Pravasi Bharatiya Divas on 9 January 2010. He was conferred with this award for the philanthropic work done under the Tanzania Heart Babies Project and for being instrumental in highlighting India as a center of cutting-edge medical treatment in the world. In 2013, he received the PBS medal by the High Commission of India in Dar es Salaam. On 25 April 2014, he was presented with the 'Order of the United Republic Medal' by the former President of Tanzania, Dr. Jakaya Kikwete.
