= World Allergy Organization =

- Formation: 1951; 75 years ago
- Headquarters: Milwaukee, Wisconsin
- Official language: English
- President: Bryan L. Martin
- President-Elect: Mário Morais-Almeida
- Secretary-General/Treasurer: Gary W.K. Wong
- Past-President: Motohiro Ebisawa
- Website: http://www.worldallergy.org

The World Allergy Organization (WAO) is an international umbrella organization of 111 regional and national allergology and clinical immunology societies. Since the first World Allergy Congress (WAC) held in Zurich, Switzerland in 1951, there have been 29 WACs as well as a number of WAO International Science Conferences (WISC), Webinars, and Symposia. Beyond sharing research findings, these meetings also allocate funds for postgraduate programs on allergy and clinical immunology.

== History ==
After the International Association of Allergology and Clinical Immunology (renamed as World Allergy Organization) was founded at the 1951 International Congress of Allergology and Clinical Immunology (renamed as World Allergy Congress), these major conferences were held triennially until the 2003 switch to a biennial format.

== International Meetings ==
The Annual World Allergy Congress (WAC) attracts scientists working and interested in the fields of allergy, immunology and other related fields. In most cases, WAO partners with a regional or national Member Society to host the Congress.

== Publications ==
The WAO publishes monthly issues of the open-access World Allergy Organization Journal with Alessandro Fiocchi and Mona Sulaiman Al-Ahmad serving as co-editors.

Aim and Scope

The WAOjournal publishes original mechanistic, translational, and clinical research on the topics of allergy, asthma, anaphylaxis, and clinical immunology, as well as reviews, guidelines, and position papers that contribute to the improvement of patient care. WAOjournal publishes research on the growth of allergy prevalence within the scope of single countries, country comparisons, and practical global issues and regulations, or threats to the allergy specialty. The Journal invites the submissions of all authors interested in publishing on current global problems in allergy, asthma, anaphylaxis, and immunology. Of particular interest are the immunological consequences of climate change and the subsequent systematic transformations in food habits and their consequences for the allergy/immunology discipline.

== Partnerships ==
WAO is a member of the Council for International Organizations of Medical Science (CIOMS). Its collaborations with the World Health Organization (WHO) include a January 2002 meeting on the "Prevention of Allergy and Allergic Asthma" held in Geneva, Switzerland that emphasized minimizing air pollution and teaching patients to carry epinephrine autoinjectors.

== See also ==
- Ruby Umesh Pawankar
