= Rajagopal (researcher) =

- Born: March 11, 1957 (age 69); Jagdalpur, Chhattisgarh, India.
- Education: Ravishankar University
- Occupations: Author, Marketing Professor, Management Consultant
- Known for: Management Education, Marketing
- Awards: Pravasi Bharatiya Samman Award, January 10, 2023

Rajagopal is a professor and researcher in business and marketing with the Monterrey Institute of Technology and Higher Education (Tec de Monterrey). He has written over forty books in his field and his work has been recognized by Level III (Highest level) membership in Mexico's Sistema Nacional de Investigadores among other awards.

== Life and education ==
Rajagopal was born in Jagdalpur, Chhattisgarh and received his masters in economics and a doctorate in marketing from Ravishankar University in India. His education was supported by fellowships from the British Council, the Indian Council of Social Science Research, one from the Ministry of Social Welfare in India and a national merit scholarship from the government of India.

== Career ==
Rajagopal began his career first at the National Institute of Rural Development in Hyderabad from 1984 to 1994. He then went on to work with the Institute of Rural Management, Anand and the Administrative Staff College of India.

During that time, he wrote books and journal articles, which led to an invitation from the Tec de Monterrey to join its faculty in 2000 as a professor of marketing. He currently teaches competitor analysis, marketing strategy, advance sales management, advertising and communication and services marketing at both the undergraduate level and with the EGADE Business School at the graduate level, and is a visiting professor at Boston University.

Rajagopal divides his time in three broad areas: teaching and research, writing books on new concepts and editing journals, and considers teaching and research to be symbiotic. His research interests are in brand management, selling systems, services marketing, international marketing, rural economic linkages and development economics. He believes that marketing is core to the development of “all societies, economy, and grown of nations.”

== Hindi literature ==
Belonging to a non-Hindi speaking family, his interest in Hindi literature was nurtured by his mentors at school and regional poets. He has contributed to Hindi poetry.

== Recognitions ==
Recognitions for his work include being named best research professor at Tec de Monterrey in 2004, and Level III membership in Mexico’s Sistema Nacional de Investigadores in 2004. In 2006, he was inducted as a fellow of the Royal Society for the Encouragement of Arts, Manufactures and Commerce, London and a fellow of the Chartered Management Institute . In 2008 and 2009 he was listed in Who’s Who in the World. In 2009 he was listed as one of the 2000 Outstanding Intellectuals of the 21st century at the International Biographical Centre in Cambridge and made a fellow of the Institute of Operations Management in the United Kingdom. In 2011 he received the ITESM Innovative Teaching Award.

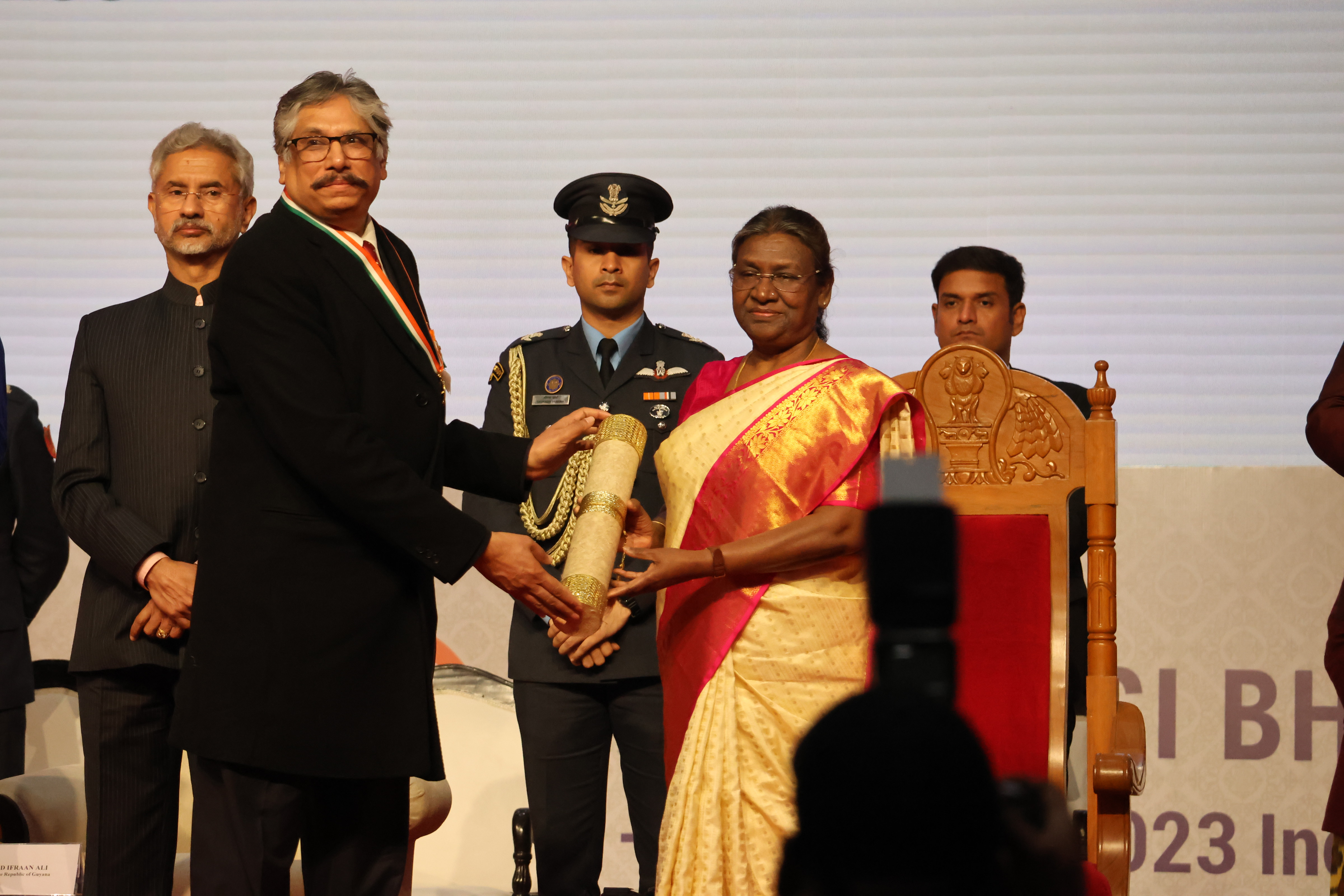
Rajagopal receiving Pravasi Bharatiya Samman Award from the Honorable President of India Droupadi Murmu

Rajagopal has been conferred Pravasi Bharatiya Samman Award on January 10, 2023 by the President of India in acknowledgement of the outstanding achievement in the field of Education for his outstanding contribution in the field of Education. This is the highest honor conferred to an overseas citizens of India.

== Publications ==
Rajagopal has written over thirty five books on marketing and rural development, and about two hundred journal and other articles.

- Brand Management-Strategy, measurement and yield analysis (2013) ISBN 978-1600219450
- Marketing Decision Making and the Management of Pricing: Successful Business Tools (2013) ISBN 9781466640948
- Managing Social Media and Consumerism: The Grapevine Effect in Competitive Markets (2013) ISBN 9781137281913
- International Marketing (2010) ISBN 978-8125918561
- Dynamics of International Trade and Economy (2007) ISBN 9781600217074
- Marketing Dynamics (theory and practice) (2007) ISBN 9788122419429
- Marketing: Strategy, Implementation and Control (2004) ISBN 9788170338109
- Rural Marketing: Policy Planning and Management (1995) ISBN 9780803992009

== See also ==
- List of Monterrey Institute of Technology and Higher Education faculty
