= Ruby Umesh Pawankar =

Indian scientist

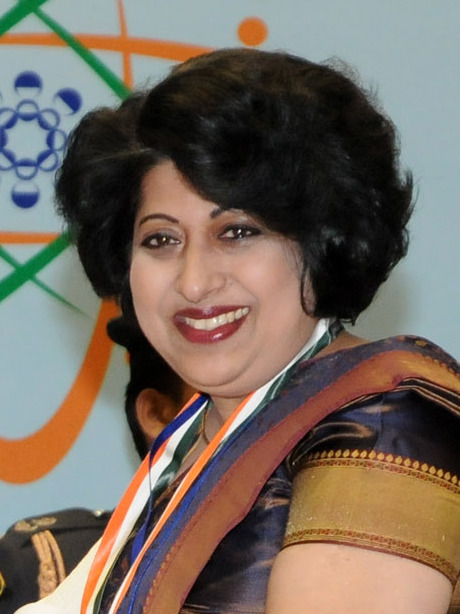
- Born: Kolkata, India
- Education: Armed Forces Medical College; B. J. Medical College; Nippon Medical School (MD, PhD)
- Scientific career
- Fields: Immunology
- Workplaces: Nippon Medical School

Ruby Pawankar is an immunologist who served as the president of the World Allergy Organization (WAO) from 2012 to 2013. She is the first Indian and first woman president of WAO, which was established in 1951. She also served as president of the Asia Pacific Association of Allergy Asthma and Clinical Immunology (APAAACI) from 2018 to 2023. and as a council member of Collegium Internationale Allergolicum (CIA) from 2016 to 2022. She is professor of allergy, department of pediatrics at Nippon Medical School and guest professor at Showa University School of Medicine, Kyung Hee University School of Medicine, and St. John's National Academy of Health Sciences. She is a recipient of Pravasi Bharatiya Samman 2010 for excellence in medicine, from the president of India.

== Biography ==
Pawankar was born in Kolkata, West Bengal, India. She studied in Loreto, Kolkata and did her undergraduate medical education at the Armed Forces Medical College in Pune. She earned her post-graduate degree from B. J. Medical College before undergoing training in allergy and clinical immunology from Nippon Medical School and Juntendo University School of Medicine in Tokyo. She received her doctorate in allergy and clinical immunology from Nippon Medical School.

=== Career ===
Pawankar has served on numerous committees and boards of many academic organizations and grant reviews. She has been a Member/Fellow of several academic organizations including the Collegium International Allergolicum, the American Academy of Allergy, Asthma, and Immunology, the American College of Allergy and Immunology the European Academy of Allergy and Clinical Immunology and the Japanese Society of Allergology. She is currently also the president of the Indian Academy of Allergy and advisor to the international committee of the Japanese Society of Allergology. She is a member of the ELN Network, Inflame, the World Universities Network, GARD, board member of Interasma.

Besides her clinical and teaching assignments in allergy, her research has focused on the cellular and molecular mechanisms of allergy, impact of environmental pollutants, and novel therapies for allergies. Among her key contributions is the role of gamma delta T cells in allergy and that of mast cells with increased Fcepsilon receptor expression as a major source of the obligatory pro- allergic Th2 cytokines capable of driving local allergen-specific IgE synthesis. This has formed the basis of the successful therapies targeting these cytokines with biological therapeutics today. Her research and educational activities have been strongly translational as it applies to clinical science. She has worked on the role of environmental factors including particulate matter and mite allergens on respiratory allergies and the role of epithelial cells in regulating immune inflammation in allergic airway disease This has resulted in 498 publications with a h-index of 64. She is an Editor of several peer-reviewed journals and books including ‘Allergy Frontiers’, the WAO White Book on Allergy, Update on Respiratory Disorders.

Ruby Pawankar has presided as President/Congress Chair several international congresses including the International Symposium in Allergy and Asthma (ISBAAR) in Tokyo, Japan in 2001, the 10th Trans Pacific Allergy Congress in 2004, in Mumbai, India, the 9th Asian Rhinology Symposium, the Middle East Allergy Asthma Immunology Congress in 2009, 2011, 2015, the WAO International Scientific Conference (WISC) 2012, in Hyderabad, India and the World Allergy Asthma Congress 2013 (WAAC 2013), Milan, Italy.

Published articles include "Asthma insights and reality in the United Arab Emirates" through NCBI.

== Recognition ==
Pawankar has focused on the furtherance of India-Japan medical collaboration. She has been recognised in Japan and worldwide for her outstanding contributions to science in the field of allergy asthma and clinical immunology. Other academic awards include the International Distinguished Fellow Award of ACAAI, the Life Time Achievement Award in Allergy, DN Shivpuri Oration, the SK Malik Oration, Global Accelator Award and the World Achievement Award.

Year	Country of Residence	Award name	Given by	Field of Merit
2010	Japan	Pravasi Bharatiya Samman	President of India	Medicine
