= Nihal Singh Agar =

Indian physiologist, educator and community leader

Nihal Singh Agar AM
- Born: India
- Occupations: Physiologist, educator, social worker
- Awards: Member of the Order of Australia (2015); Pravasi Bharatiya Samman (2019)

Nihal Singh Agar AM is an Indian-born Australian educator and community leader.

He is a former professor of physiology at the University of New England (UNE) and has held leadership roles in several Hindu community organizations in Australia, including the Hindu Council of Australia and the Vishwa Hindu Parishad.

== Early life and academic career ==
Agar was raised in India and graduated from Mathura Veterinary College. In 1967, he relocated to Australia to conduct post-doctoral research in physiology at the UNE in Armidale.

Agar's academic career spanned over three decades. He served as Professor and Head of the Department of Physiology at UNE until his retirement in 2000. He was later appointed an honorary associate at the University of Sydney.

== Community leadership ==
In 1989, he became the founding president of the Vishwa Hindu Parishad of Australia, a position he held until 2005. He has also served as the Chairman and President of the Hindu Council of Australia.

During his tenure with the Hindu Council, he was involved in the development of the annual Deepavali Mela in Sydney. In 2014, he chaired the Indian Australian Community Foundation, which coordinated the reception for Indian Prime Minister Narendra Modi at the Sydney Olympic Park.

== Philanthropy ==
In 2007, Agar established the Australian chapter of the Ekal Foundation. The organization supports the "One Teacher School" model, which provides primary education and vocational training in rural and tribal regions of India.

== Awards and recognition ==
- Member of the Order of Australia
- Pravasi Bharatiya Samman (2019)
