= KT Rabeeullah =

Indian businessman

Dr. K.T. Rabeeullah
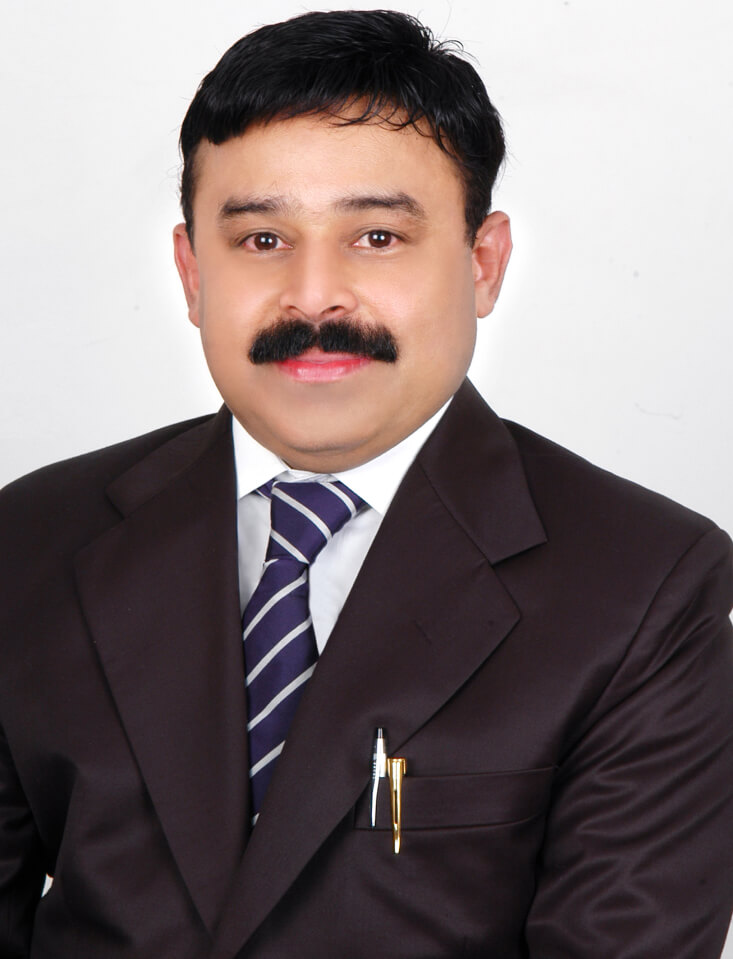
- Occupation: Businessman -

Dr. K.T. Rabeeullah is a Gulf based Indian businessman, philanthropist and chairman of Shifa Al Jazeera Medical Group. He is also involved in various humanity and charity work.

Rabiullah, owns and operates about 50 hospitals and clinics across the Gulf countries, including 12 medical centers in Saudi Arabia. He has spoken on the growth prospects of the health sector and the need for quality health institutions in Saudi Arabia, the Gulf states, and India.

== Early life ==
Dr. K.T. Rabiullah came from Malappuram, Kerala to Saudi Arabia 30 years ago to join a construction company. Like other immigrant workers, he worked long hours for a low salary, which made even basic medicinal care unaffordable. This inspired him to provide quality medical treatment at affordable prices to poor people in the Gulf states. Today, Shifa Al Jazeera Medical Centre, conceived by Rabiullah, has become a huge chain across the region. Rabiullah has received Pravasi Bharatiya Samman by President of India Mr. Pranab Mukherjee in 2013 in the merit of his Outstanding achievements".

== Awards and achievements ==
Year	Country of residence	Award name	Given by	Field of Merit
2013	United Arab Emirates	Pravasi Bharatiya Samman	President of India	In recognition of the social work
