= Siddeek Ahmed =

Indian entrepreneur and philanthropist

Dr. Siddeek Ahmed Haji Panamtharayil
- Born: May 1, 1968 (age 58); Mankarai, Kerala, India
- Education: Harvard Business School (Pursuing)
- Occupations: Entrepreneur; Investor
- Years active: 1995 - Present
- Known for: Work towards toilets in India
- Awards: Pravasi Bharatiya Samman. 2021

Siddeek Ahmed (born 1 May 1968) is an Indian entrepreneur and philanthropist. He is the chairman of Eram Group, a business conglomerate with operations in several sectors including oil and gas, power, construction, manufacturing, travel, healthcare, IT, media, logistics, automotive and training and education. He also works for the benefit of rural India. Ahmed was the recipient of the Pravasi Bhartiya Samman Award in 2021 for his work in various domains like that of education, business, medicine, employment and the environment. Because of his work towards improved toilet hygiene, Prime Minister Narendra Modi gave the Toilet Titan Award to Dr. Ahmed at the Safaigiri Summit in 2015. He is also listed as the top Indian business leader in the Middle East by Forbes in 2021

== Early life ==
Dr Ahmed was born in Mankarai - a village in Palakkad, Kerala to Panamtharayil Ahmed Haji and Mariyumma and grew up with eight siblings, being second youngest in family. In his early 20s, after graduating with a Diploma in Electronics, Ahmed moved to the Middle East.

== Career ==
Dr Ahmed founded Eram Group (headquartered in Alkhobar) that currently includes 40 distinct organizations that are functional in 16 countries including Saudi Arabia, Kingdom of Bahrain, United Arab Emirates, United Kingdom, Italy, Kuwait, South Korea, Malaysia, United States of America and more.

The group operates in various sectors such as travel management, industrial contracting, customized turnkey solutions to the manufacturing of products, automotive and health care sector.

Apart from running several businesses, he is also involved in social causes. He has used his expertise and knowledge of 25 years in the corporate world for the betterment of rural people.

== Philanthropy ==
The Eram group engages in several social entrepreneurship and philanthropy activities in various sectors such as education, health, sanitation and youth empowerment. A few years ago when the lack of public sanitation affected women and children largely in India, it led Ahmed to focus on and bring about a change in the situation of sanitation. Ahmed set up the Eram Scientific Solutions (ESS), a social enterprise focusing on research and development in Khobar, Saudi Arabia. In 2008, ESS developed eToilets that have been set up in India. ESS was the recipient of a grant of more than 400,000 USD from the Bill & Melinda Gates Foundation for research into toilet hygiene, water and energy related issues. The ingenious 'e-toilet' (an automated public sanitation solution in line with Swachh Bharat Abhiyaan) was illustrated in the UN Innovation exhibition. These unmanned toilets with automated access control were provided on a commercial basis since 2010. The initiative later spread to middle east and north African countries. Dr. Ahmed has also collaborated with the United Nations Information Centre, India, for propagating Sustainable Development Goals. To encourage more young people to pursue a healthy and active lifestyle, he instituted the UN@70 Cup, an All Kerala Inter-School football tournament, thus named to commemorate 70 years of the United Nations existence.

Dr. Ahmed has been supporting individuals in Kerala by donating towards heart transplantations. He also runs a skill-training institute ESPOiR Academy that functions under the Kerala Academy for Skills Excellence (KASE). The academy provides training in practical skills to improve employability in various sectors. He also contributed INR 2 crore towards the Kerala Chief Minister's Relief fund during 2018 Kerala floods.

== Personal life ==
Ahmed is married to his wife Nushaiba and together they have three children - Rizwan, Rizana and Rizvi

== Awards ==
- Recipient of the diaspora award representing Saudi Arabia.
- Recipient of First Gulf Madhyamam Indo-Arab Business Icon Award for promoting trade relations between Saudi Arabia and India
- P.V. Sami Memorial Industries and Socio-cultural Award, Instituted in memory of P.V. Sami, founder of the KTC group
