= Ashok Kumar Mago =

- Born: India
- Occupation: Business person
- Spouse: Monica
- Children: Ajay; Anita
- Awards: Padma Shri; Pravasi Bharatiya Samman Haryana Gaurav Samman

Ashok Kumar Mago, Distinguished Alumni of Naveen Jindal School of Management at University of Texas at Dallas is an Indian born American business person and the founder Chairman of Greater Dallas Indo American Chamber, now known as (US-INDIA Chamber of Commerce) who is known for his involvement of the Senate India caucus. He was awarded the Padma Shree, the fourth highest civilian award, by the Government of India, in 2014, for his services to the trade and industry.

== Biography ==
Ashok Kumar Mago was born in India where he did his early schooling and migrated to the US, landing at Dallas Fort Worth, in 1974. Later, he obtained a master's degree in Business Administration (MBA) from the University of Texas at Dallas and started Mago and Associates, a private Management Consulting firm, in 1991.

Ashok has been recognized for his philanthropy, his efforts to foster trade between Texas and India, and his ability to create U.S. congressional momentum in support of India. Ashok is part of a network of business, civic, and political leaders that champion causes important to the USA and India.

Ashok Mago's numerous leadership positions have contributed to the growth of India-U.S. business relations. Through decades of involvement with the civic, business, and political organisations in the United States, he has educated leaders about India's global potential and the possibilities that a stronger relationship between the two nations could generate.

In 1993, he was appointed as the Commissioner of the Plan and Zoning Commission of the City of Dallas. This was followed by numerous positions of which one of special note is that of the * Director of the Dallas Fort Worth International Airport Board, in 2002, the same airport where he landed as an immigrant in 1974. In between, he founded the Greater Dallas Indo-American Chamber of Commerce,(Now known as US-INDIA Chamber of Commerce) in 1999, of which he was the founder chairman. He is also credited with efforts in raising millions of dollars for the Asian organizations based in Dallas. In 2004, Mago invited Senator Cornyn for an India visit when he proposed the idea of forming a caucus to the Senator. After returning from the trip, Senator Cornyn, along with Senator Hillary Clinton, founded the Senate India Caucus. “It is with his help that I co-founded the Senate India Caucus with then-Senator Hillary Clinton and continue to co-chair this caucus now," says Sen. Cornyn recognizing Ashok Mago's intense lobbying to create the caucus. As a result, India is the only country that has a caucus in the U.S. Senate.

Ashok Mago is also credited with removing India's nuclear apartheid. He worked tirelessly to obtain support in the U.S. Congress for the U.S. and India Civil Nuclear Cooperation Agreement. His relentless efforts in the House of Representatives provided substantial number of co-sponsors for the US-India Civil Nuclear bill. He has contributed significantly to taking the India-US bilateral relationship to its current level-as a "global strategic partnership”. Today as a mentor, he molds the minds of individuals, and as an influencer, he guides the responsibilities of institutions to look ahead to where they can go but never forget where they began.

Ashok has served or serves on numerous boards and commissions: Member Board of Regents University of North Texas, Director Dallas Fort Worth International Airport Board, Community Advisory Board Member UT SouthwesternSimmons Cancer Center, Advisory Board Member BBVA Compass Bank, Advisory Council Member Dallas Mavericks, Director 1st Independent National Bank Plano, Texas, Board member Dallas County Community College Foundation Board, Chairman Urban League Greater Dallas & North Texas Central, Board Member Dallas County Work Source Development Board, Co-chair Dallas Together Forum, Member Board of Trustees Dallas Museum of Art, Chairman Greater Dallas Community Relations Commission, Board & Executive Board Member of Dallas Regional Chamber, board member dallas Symphony Orchestra, Advisory Board Member Salvation Army DFW, Board Member Leadership Dallas Alumni Association, Board & Executive Board Member Dallas Convention & Visitors Bureau, Past District Governor District 2X-1 of Lions Club International, Board Member United Way of Metropolitan Dallas, Commissioner City of Dallas Plan & Zoning Commission, Board Member North Texas Commission, Chairman Emeritus of Greater Dallas Asian American Chamber of Commerce(Now known as (Asian Chamber of Texas), Chairman Board of Trustees of India Association of North Texas, board member primary Care Clinic of North Texas, Chairman Board of Trustees DFW Hindu Temple Society, Member North Texas Super Bowl XLV Host Committee, Board Member Dallas County Work Source Development Board

Honors & Awards

=== Chair in Management ===
Honor issuer University of Texas at Dallas, Jindal School of Management

Honor description Ashok & Monica Mago Chair in Management (Dr. Elena Katok)

Ashok & Monica Mago Family Fellowship at Jindal School of Management.

2019 Ashok Mago Legacy Award

In 2019 USINDIA Chamber of Commerce, DFW Established Ashok Mago Legacy Award for excellence in Community Service

Award is given every year at chamber's annual awards banquet to an individual or organization for Outstanding Community Service.

Haryana Gaurav Samman

In 2017, he was honored with the "Haryana Gaurav Samman" by the Government of Haryana. The award was given to people of Haryanvi origin residing outside of Haryana who have made significant contributions in various fields.

=== Distinguished Alumnus ===
April 2016 honor issuer University of Texas at Dallas.

Every year The University of Texas at Dallas honors outstanding alumni. The Distinguished Alumni Award is the highest honor that the university bestows on its alumni. It is presented to individuals who are distinguished in their chosen professions or life's work who demonstrate pride in the university

=== Padma Shri ===
March 2014, honor issuer, President of India, Hon. Pranab Mukherjee

Padma Shri is 4th highest civilian award in the republic of India. This award is primarily given to citizens of India in recognition of their distinguished contributions in various spheres of activity. But it has also been awarded to some distinguished individuals who were not citizens of India but did contribute in various ways to India. Ashok received this award in the category of Trade and Industry

=== Core Value: Diversity award ===
Apr 2013 honor issuer North Texas Food Bank

Recipients of the award have shown exemplary effort in pursuing a hunger free community.

=== Minority Business Leader Award ===
Feb 2013 honor issuer Dallas Business Journal

=== Pravasi Bhartiya Samman ===
January 2010 From President of India, Hon. Pratibha Devisingh Patil

It is the highest honor conferred on overseas Indians or persons of Indian origin in recognition of their outstanding achievements both in India and abroad.

=== Lions International Presidential Leadership Award ===
2007 honor issuer Lions International

=== Helen Keller Award ===
Jun 1996 honor issuer Lions Sight & Tissue Foundation

=== Distinguished Alumni Award ===
1994 honor issuer Leadership Dallas Alumni Association

The Distinguished Alumni Award is presented to a Leadership Dallas alumnus who has made a positive difference in the Dallas region. The award emphasizes the importance of active involvement in the Dallas region and serves to encourage and provide a role model for others.
