= Anil Sooklal =

South African diplomat and academic

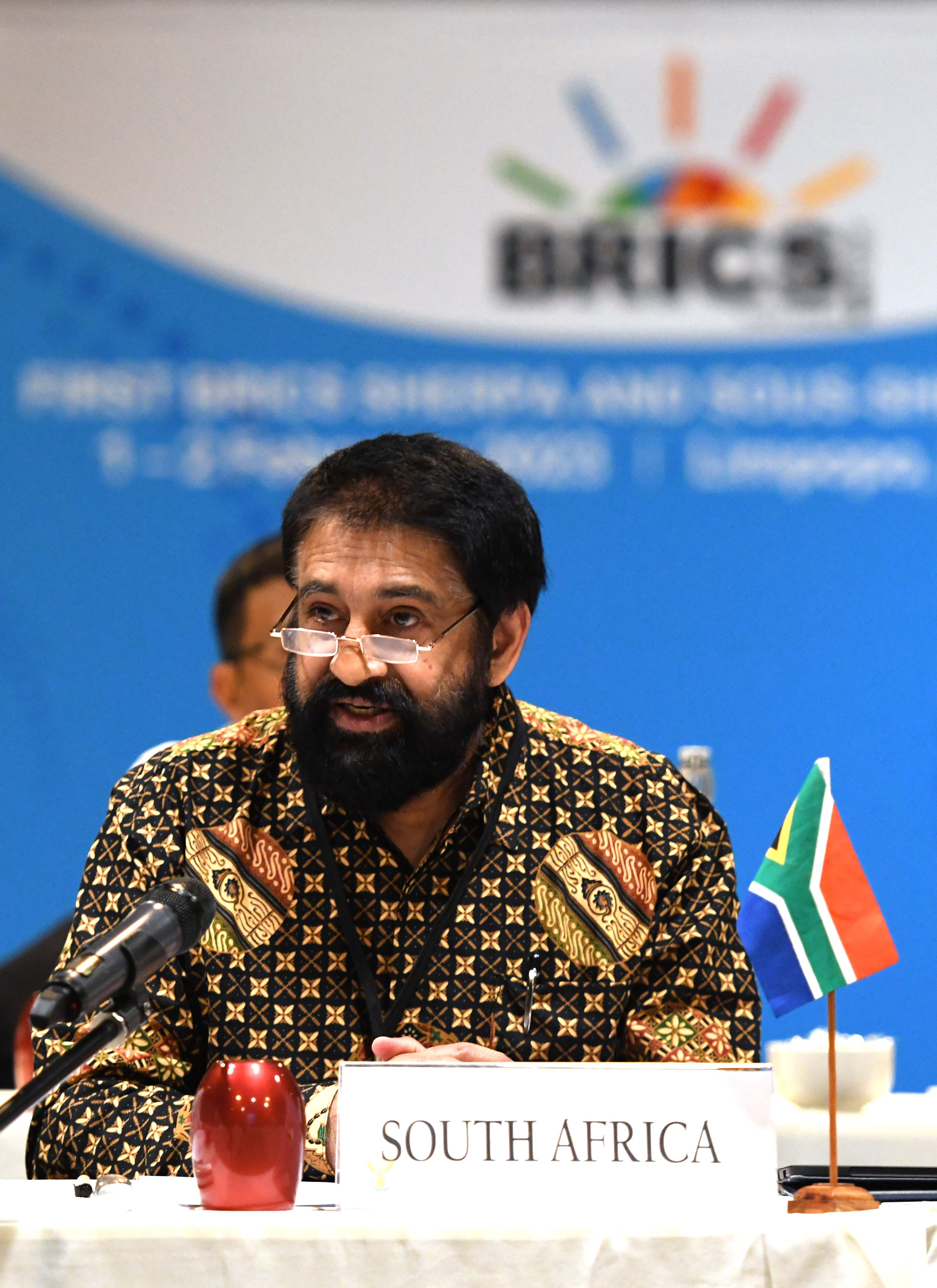
- 2023 BRICS Sherpa

High Commissioner of South Africa to India
- Incumbent
- Assumed office June 2024
- President: Cyril Ramaphosa
- Preceded by: S'bu Ndebele

Personal details
- Born: Durban, South Africa
- Education: University of Durban-Westville
- Occupation: Diplomat, Academic

Anil Sooklal is a South African diplomat and academic. He currently serves as the High Commissioner of South Africa to India. In 2019, he was awarded the Pravasi Bharatiya Samman by the President of India for contributions in the field of diplomacy, which is the highest honor for overseas Indians.

== Education ==
Born into a family of Indian descent, Sooklal's ancestors arrived in South Africa in 1893 as indentured labourers. Sooklal attended the University of Durban-Westville (now the University of KwaZulu-Natal), where he completed a double PhD in Oriental History and Religious Studies.

== Career ==
=== Academia ===
Sooklal was a lecturer at the University of South Africa (UNISA) and a senior lecturer at the University of KwaZulu-Natal. He has published approximately 20 scholarly articles and served as an editor for journal Nidan.

=== Diplomacy ===
Sooklal joined the Department of International Relations and Cooperation (DIRCO) in 1995. From 2006 to 2012, he served as the South African Ambassador to the European Union, Belgium, and Luxembourg. He has also served as South Africa's Sherpa for BRICS, the G20, and the IBSA Dialogue Forum. In June 2024, he was appointed High Commissioner to India, with non-resident accreditation to Bangladesh and Nepal. In June 2026 Sooklal was photographed with uMkhonto weSizwe Party founder and leader, Jacob Zuma at a Hindu temple in Haridwar, northern India, alongside Ajay Gupta who is still a wanted fugitive in South Africa. Sooklal was later recalled in August 2026.

== Honors and awards ==
- Pravasi Bharatiya Samman (2019): Awarded for contributions to diplomacy.
- Order of Friendship (Russia): Awarded in 2023 for contributions to South Africa–Russia relations.
- Honorary Doctorate: Conferred by the University of International Business and Economics, Beijing (2023).

== See also ==
- India–South Africa relations
- List of High Commissioners of South Africa to India
