= Joy Cherian =

American politician

Dr. Joy Cherian
- Born: 18 May 1942 (age 83); Kerala, India
- Occupation: International consultant
- Awards: India Abroad Lifetime Achievement Award; Pravasi Bharatiya Samman

Dr. Joy Cherian is the first Indian American Commissioner at the United States Equal Employment Opportunity Commission (EEOC).

Joy Cherian was appointed as the Commissioner at the United States Equal Employment Opportunity Commission (EEOC) by President Ronald Reagan in 1987, which was seen as a milestone. At the time, he was the highest ranking Indian American in the US government. Appointed by a Republican, but showing true unity of Indian Americans across political boundaries, the Indo-American Democratic Organization lobbied for his re-appointment in 1991. After serving his time as commissioner, he founded and was President of a consulting firm, J. Cherian Consultants, Inc. (JCC) and did speaking engagements for organizations such as the GOPIO.

== Background ==
Joy Cherian was born 18 May 1942, in Kerala, India. He completed his matriculation studies from Sacred Heart High School, Thevara and graduated from the University of Kerala, Kerala State, India (B.A., 1963; Bachelor of Law, 1965); Catholic University of America (M.A., 1970; Ph.D., 1974); and George Washington University (M.C.L., 1978). He was noted for his diligence and exemplary academic performance even from his high school days.

Joy Cherian is married, has two children, and resides in Wheaton, Maryland.

== Achievements ==
His first book, Investment Contracts and Arbitration (1975), is used as a reference resource in graduate school libraries in the United States and abroad. Our Relay Race (1997), his second book, reflects his public and community service. Scores of his papers, articles and speeches on various subjects have been published around the world.

Joy Cherian is credited with the formation of several committees of the American Bar Association (ABA), including the Committee on International Insurance Law and the Committee on International Employment Law of the ABA's Section of International Law and Practice. He chaired these Committees from 1983 to 1987 and 1988 to 1992, respectively. For a decade, he served as president of the American Council for Trade in Services (ACTS), a Washington, D.C.–based nonprofit service industry trade association (1994–2004).

He was awarded India Abroad Lifetime Achievement Award by India Abroad for his service to the community in 2007. He is also the recipient of Pravasi Bharatiya Samman Award by the President of India for outstanding contributions to home country in 2008.
