= Sudhir M. Parikh =

American medical doctor of Indian origin

- Born: Gujarat, India
- Occupations: Medical doctor, social worker
- Awards: Padma Shri; National Excellence Award; Ellis Island Medal of Honor; Pravasi Bharatiya Samman
- Website: Official web site

Sudhir M. Parikh is an American medical doctor of Indian origin, known for his expertise in the treatment of asthma and allergies and for his social activities. The Government of India honoured him, in 2010, with the award of Padma Shri, the fourth highest civilian award, for his contributions to the field of social service.

== Biography ==
Sudhir M. Parikh, a Gujarat born medical graduate from B. J. Medical College, Ahmedabad, migrated to the US in the Seventies, is a known allergist and immunologist, practicing in Highland Park, New Jersey. He set up his private practice in 1980 at Hoboken, New Jersey and is now associated with several hospitals such as Asthma and Allergy of New Jersey, Asthma and Allergy Medical Care of New York, Allergy Asthma Associates of Murray Hill, Christ Hospital and Hoboken University Medical Center. He also works for the Robert Wood Johnson Medical School in the capacity of an assistant professor.

== Social activities ==
Parikh is known to be involved in social activities in a number of areas, partly on behalf of the foundation he founded in the nineties, the Parikh Foundation. Under the aegis of the foundation, Dr. Parikh assisted in raising monies for humanitarian relief activities for the tsunami victims of Tamil Nadu and the earthquake victims of Gujarat. He was one of delegates who accompanied President Bill Clinton on his visit of the affected areas of the Gujarat earthquake. He has also contributed towards raising of funds to spread AIDS awareness and other healthcare issues in India. He is reported to have contributed more than US$ 2 million from his personal funds to Share and Care Foundation, Nargis Dutt Memorial Foundation, and the American India Foundation. He provided the corpus for a scholarship programme for the Indo American community through Share and Care Foundation during 1995 through 2005 and is a supporter of the Ekal Vidyalaya, a tribal education programme in India.

Parikh is a former member of the National Leadership Advisory Committee of the Congressional Caucus on India and Indian Americans. It is reported that Dr. Parikh's interventions helped to influence Congressmen Elliot Engel, Rush Holt and Anthony Weiner to join the Caucus. He is also a founder member of the Indian American Republican Council (IARC). Parikh Worldwide Media is a publishing house he has founded where he serves as the chairman. The media house has four publications, News India Times, two Desi Talk editions such as Desi Talk in New York, Desi Talk in Chicago and The Indian American. Dr. Parikh, a member of the American Association of Physicians of Indian Origin also holds memberships in the American College of Allergy and Immunology, the American Academy of Allergy and Immunology, the New Jersey Allergy Society, the New Jersey Medical Society, and the Middlesex County Medical Society.

== Awards and recognitions ==
Parikh has been honored with The Ellis Island Medal of Honor (2005) and the Pravasi Bharatiya Samman, (2006) which succeeded the National Excellence Award by the then Prime Minister of India, P. V. Narasimha Rao, in 2002. In 2010, he was awarded the Padma Shri, when he was included in the Indian Republic Day honours.
