= Sachchidanand Sahai =

Indian epigraphist and writer

- Born: 6 March 1941 (age 85); Bihar
- Occupations: Epigraphist, Writer
- Spouse: Sudha Verma (m 1963-1987, her death)
- Children: Soma Sahai Srivastava
- Awards: Padma Shri Pravasi Bharatiya Samman

Sachchidanand Sahai is an Indian epigraphist, writer and the scientific advisor to the Government of Cambodia for restoration of Angkor Wat and the Temple of Preah Vihear, known for his knowledge on Khmer civilization. He was honored by the Government of India, in 2012, with the fourth highest Indian civilian award of Padma Shri.

== Biography ==
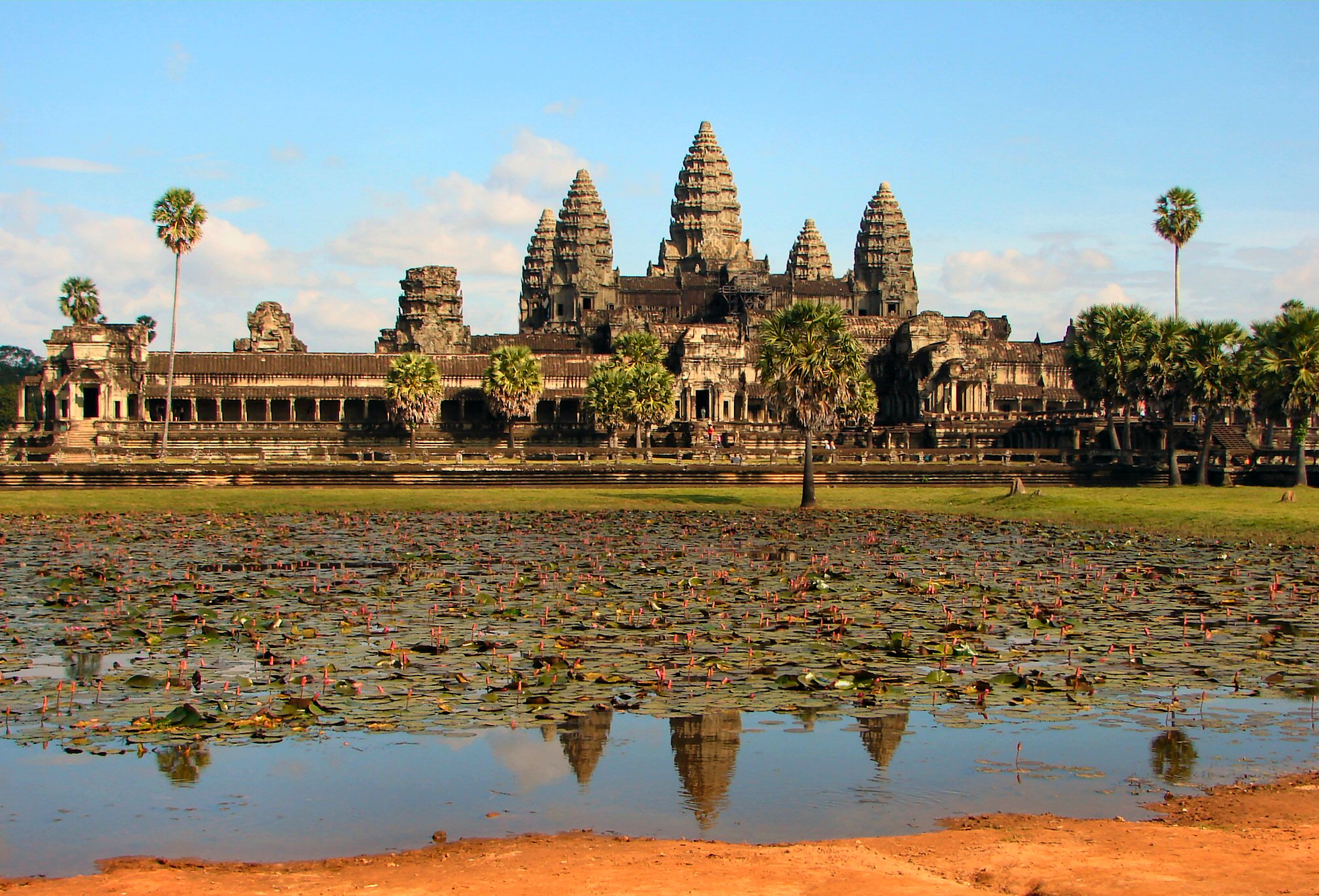
Angkor Wat

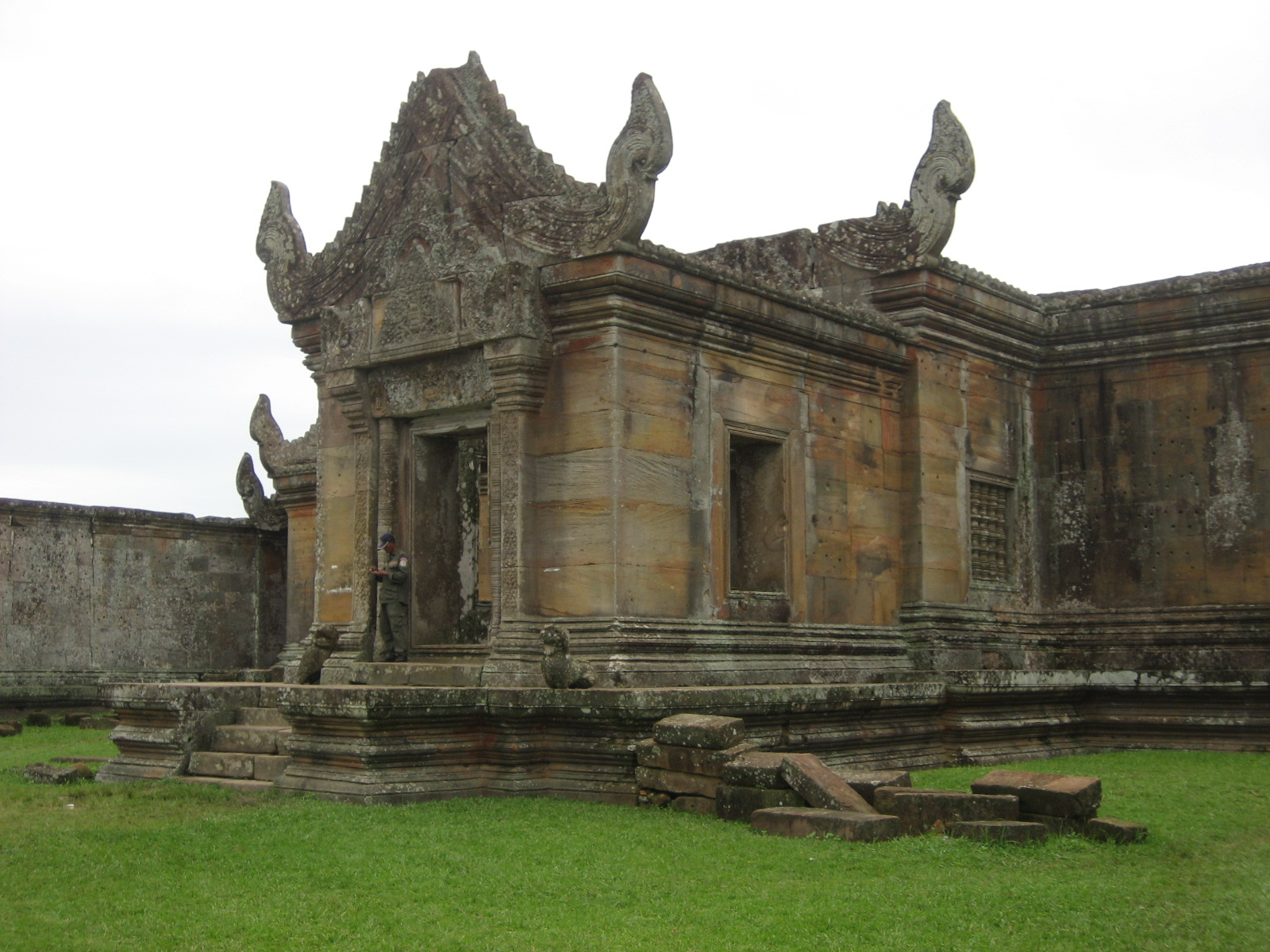
Preah Vihear

Sachchidanand Sahai was born on 6 March 1941 in the Indian state of Bihar. He secured the post graduate degree (MA) from Banaras Hindu University, Varanasi, in 1962, in ancient Indian history, culture and archaeology and did research under the guidance of George Coedes in the University of Paris, Sorbonne on Les Institutions Politiques et l'organization administration du Cambode ancien to secure a doctoral degree. Afterwards, he went to Laos in 1970 as the visiting professor of the Indian Council for Cultural Relations and worked till 1972. A 1981 Fulbright fellow of the Cornell University of Ithaca, New York, Sahai has worked as a research professor at Indira Gandhi National Centre for the Arts from 1988 to 1990 when he joined the Department of Ancient Indian and Asian Studies, Magadh University, Bodh Gaya as its pro vice chancellor and stayed with the university till 2010. He is also a former national professor of epigraphy, Institute of Archaeology, a Government of India funded institution.

Sachchidanand Sahai lives in Cambodia attending to his duties as the scientific advisor to the Government of Cambodia.

== Legacy ==
Sachchidanand Sahai has served as a distinguished visitor for the Indian Council for Cultural Relations to the ASEAN countries. He is the founder editor of the South East Asian Review since 1976, a journal dedicated to the cultural heritage of South East Asia and the Indian subcontinent. He has conducted a year-long tour of Chile, during 2011-12, as a visiting lecturer for ICCR.

As a scientific advisor to the Government of Cambodia, Sahai is known to have contributed to the restoration of the temples of Angkor Wat and Preah Vihear. He has brought out his studies on the culture and heritage of South East Asia as publications. He is the author of a five-volume work on Lao Ramayana and has done research on the visit of King Chulalongorn to India in 1872. He is also credited with a monograph, The Mekong River: Space and Social Theory. Some of the notable works of Sahai are:

- The Rama Jakaka in Laos: A Study in the Phra Lak Phra Lam
- India in 1872 as Seen by the Siamese
- The Mekong River: Space and Social Theory
- The Bayon of Angkor Thom
- The Hindu Temples in Southeast Asia
- Preah Vihear - An Introduction to the World Heritage Monument
- The Kr̥ṣṇa Saga in Laos: A Study in the Br̲aḥ Kuʼtd Br̲aḥ Bān

Sahai is also reported to have contributed to the dissemination of knowledge about the South East Asian culture through his addresses at several conferences.

== Awards and recognitions ==
Sachchidanand Sahai has been a fellow of the Indian Institute of Advanced Studies, Shimla (2003-2006) as well as the Australian National University and the Fondation Maison des sciences de l'homme, Paris. He is a recipient of the A. S. Altekar Gold Medal (1962) of Banares Hindu University and V. K. V. Rao Memorial Life Time Achievement Award (2003) of the Indian Association of Social Science. In the year 2012, the Government of India awarded him the civilian honor of Padma Shri and the Non Resident Indian award of Pravasi Bharatiya Samman.

== Personal life ==
Sachchidanand Sahai was married to Sudha Verma, a scholar in Hindi Literature from North Bihar. She died in January 1987. They have a daughter Soma Sahai Srivastava who is a Neurologist and is currently settled with her family in USA.

== See also ==
- Epigraphy
- Angkor Wat
- Khmer Empire
- Preah Vihear
