= Ramakrishnan Sivaswamy Iyer =

NRI businessman and investor based in the UAE

- Born: January 1, 1961 (age 65); Quilon (now Kollam), Kerala, India
- Other name: Ramesh Ramakrishnan
- Education: University of Mumbai, Harvard Business School
- Occupations: Entrepreneur, businessperson, investor
- Years active: 1989–present
- Known for: Chairman of Transworld Group (shipping and logistics company)
- Spouse: Geeta Ramakrishnan
- Children: 2
- Honours: Pravasi Bharatiya Samman (2025)

Ramakrishnan Sivaswamy Iyer, also known as Ramesh Ramakrishnan, is a Non-resident Indian businessman and investor based in the United Arab Emirates (UAE). He has served as the chairman of the Transworld Group since 1989.

In 2025, he was a recipient of the Pravasi Bharatiya Samman Award.

== Early life ==
Ramakrishnan’s journey builds on the footsteps of his late father, Sivaswamy Iyer, who founded Transworld Group in 1977. He completed his education from Mumbai and then moved to Dubai to take over Transworld group after the death of his father and became its chairman in 1989.

== Career ==
Ramesh Ramakrishnan serves as a trustee of the India-UAE Friendship Hospital, an initiative for advancing healthcare, an effort that was acknowledged by former President of India, Ram Nath Kovind.

He is a founding member of the UAE Ship Owners Association and also an investor, serving as the Chairman of WAMI Capital.

== Recognition ==
In 2025, President of India Draupadi Murmu awarded him the Pravasi Bharatiya Samman Award (PBSA) for his contributions in the business sector. This award was announced by Ministry of External affairs, Government of India.

- Pravasi Bharatiya Samman Award (PBSA) 2025 by President of India
- Forbes' list of Top Indian Business Leaders In The Middle East 2021
- The Maritime Standard Hall of fame Award by Maritime Standard Awards 2024
- Businessman of the Decade by Maritime and Logistics Awards 2014

== Personal life ==
Ramakrishnan is married to Geeta Ramakrishnan and together, they have two children. Both children are actively involved in the leadership of Transworld Group.
