= Pravasi Bharatiya Samman =

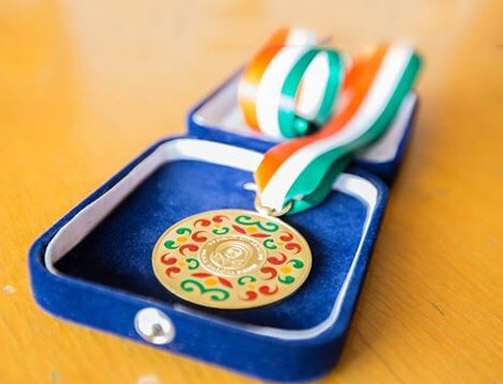
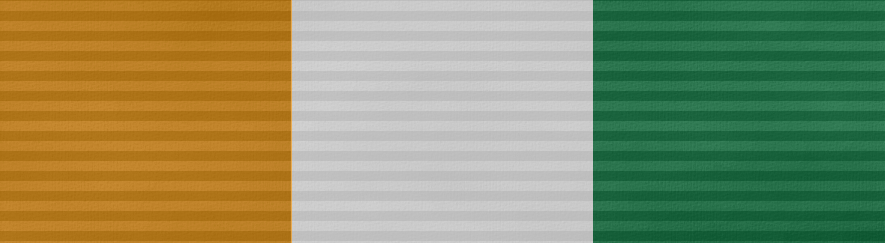
- Pravasi Bharatiya Samman Medal and Ribbon
- Awarded for: to honour exceptional Overseas Indians
- Sponsored by: President of India
- First award: 2003

Highlights
- Total awarded (2003-2025): 323

The Pravasi Bharatiya Samman (Overseas Indian Honour) is the highest honour conferred by the President of India on Overseas Indians, with a maximum of 30 awards given every two years. From 2003 to 2025, there have been 323 awardees in 10 broad categories from 85 countries. The awards are organised by the Ministry of Overseas Indian Affairs, Government of India, in conjunction with the Pravasi Bharatiya Divas (Overseas Indians Day), to honour exceptional and meritorious contribution in their chosen field/profession. The number of these awards per annum has averaged 14, compared to 18.6 for Padma Bhushan.

== Award criteria and summary ==
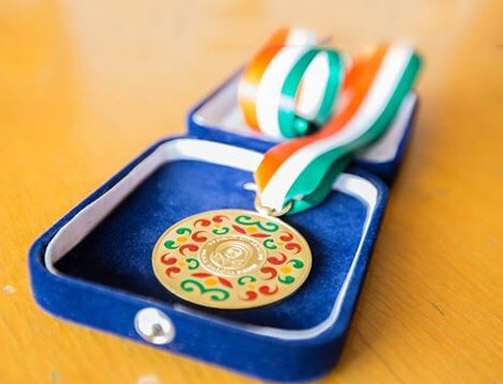
Pravasi Bharatiya Samman Award

Pravasi Bharatiya Samman (PBS) is conferred for outstanding contributions in any of the following areas:

1. "Better understanding of India"
2. "Support to India’s causes and concerns in a tangible way"
3. "Building closer links between India, the overseas Indian community and their country of residence;"
4. "Social and humanitarian causes in India or abroad"
5. "Welfare of the local Indian community"
6. "Philanthropic and charitable work"
7. "Eminence in one’s field or outstanding work, which has enhanced India’s prestige in the country of residence; or"
8. "Eminence in skills which has enhanced India’s prestige in that country (for non-professional workers)."

=== Summary by category (2003–2025; 32 dual category winners) ===
Category	Award Count
Community Service & Philanthropy	103
Business & Management	74
Public Service, Politics & Law	73
Medical Science, Hospital, Healthcare & Public Health	27
Arts, Culture & Media	25
Architecture, Engineering, Science & Technology	24
Academics & Education	23
Agriculture & Agronomy	3
Economics	2
Sports	1

Summary by country (2003–2025; 85 countries)

Country	Awards	Country	Awards
USA	53	Jamaica	2
UAE	18	Myanmar	2
UK	18	Philippines	2
South Africa	15	Poland	2
Australia	9	Portugal	2
Canada	9	Russia	2
Fiji	8	Seychelles	2
Japan	8	Sri Lanka	2
Saudi Arabia	8	Sweden	2
Guyana	7	Armenia	1
Malaysia	7	Austria	1
Mauritius	7	Azerbaijan	1
New Zealand	7	Barbados	1
Oman	7	Belgium	1
Trinidad and Tobago	7	Botswana	1
Bahrain	6	Brazil	1
Germany	6	Cambodia	1
Qatar	6	Cameroon	1
Hong Kong	5	China	1
Kenya	5	Cote D' Ivoire	1
Israel	4	Croatia	1
Mexico	4	Curacao	1
Singapore	4	Czech Republic	1
Tanzania	4	Denmark	1
Thailand	4	Djibouti	1
Brunei Darussalam	3	Egypt	1
France	3	Guinea	1
Kuwait	3	Indonesia	1
Netherlands	3	Italy	1
Reunion	3	Kyrgyzstan	1
Suriname	3	Laos	1
Switzerland	3	Liberia	1
Uganda	3	Libya	1
Bhutan	2	Madagascar	1
Ethiopia	2	Malawi	1
Maldives	1	South Sudan	1
Moldova	1	Spain	1
Mozambique	1	Sudan	1
Nigeria	1	Singapore & USA	1
Norway	1	Ukraine	1
Papua New Guinea	1	Uzbekistan	1
Republic of Congo	1	Zimbabwe	1
Romania	1		

This summary combines related citation terms under an appropriate broad category. For example, “Medical Science, Hospital, Healthcare & Public Health” covers:

Year	Recipient	Country	Exact Citation (Field)
2004	Dr. Mariam Chisti	Kuwait	Public Health
2006	Dr. Majid Uddin Kazi	Saudi Arabia	Medicine
2010	Dr. (Smt.) Ruby Umesh Pawankar	Japan	Medicine
2010	Dr. Rajni Kanabar	Tanzania	Medicine
2010	Dr. Azad Moopen	UAE	Medicine
2012	Dr. Kalpalatha Kummamuri Guntupalli	USA	Medicine
2013	Dr. Narendra Ramakrishna Kumar	USA	Healthcare
2014	Dr. Shamsheer Vayalil Parambath	UAE	Healthcare Business
2015	Dr. (Mrs.) Nandini Tandon	USA	Management of Healthcare and Business
2017	Dr. Lael Anson E. Best	Israel	Medical Science & Entrepreneur
2017	Mr. Carani Balaraman Sanjeevi	Sweden	Medical & Hospital Care
2017	Dr. Bharat Haridas Barai	USA	Medical Science & Entrepreneurship
2019	Dr. Guna Sekhar Muppuri	Jamaica	Medical Science & Entrepreneurship
2019	Dr. Prakash Madhavdas Heda	Kenya	Medical Science
2019	Dr. Zulekha Daud	UAE	Medical Science & Business
2019	Dr. Kiran Chhotubhai Patel	USA	Medical Science
2021	Dr. Rajani Chandra D'Mello	Azerbaijan	Medicine
2021	Dr. Mohan Thomas Lazarus Pakalomattom	Qatar	Medicine
2021	Dr. Anil Kumar Chotalal Mithani	Sudan	Medicine
2021	Dr. Sudhakar Jonnalagadda	USA	Medicine
2023	Dr. Alexander Maliakel John	Brunei Darussalam	Medicine
2023	Dr. Amal Kumar Mukhopadhyay	Germany	Community Welfare/Medicine
2025	Dr. Philomena Ann Mohini Harris	Barbados	Medical Science
2025	Dr. Prem Kumar	Kyrgyzstan	Medical Science
2025	Dr. Syed Anwar Khursheed	Saudi Arabia	Medical Science
2025	Dr. Kaushik Laxmidas Ramaiya	Tanzania	Medicine
2025	Dr. Sharad Lakhanpal	USA	Medicine

== Awardees for 2003 ==
Country	Name	Description
Mauritius	Rt. Hon’ble Sir Anerood Jugnauth	Prime Minister of Mauritius
South Africa	Prof. Fatima Meer	She took active part in political, social and philanthropic causes, deeply influenced by the Gandhian values and approach
Hong Kong	Dr. Hari N. Harilela	Business ventures and community welfare activities, he has been long considered the standard-bearer and the most recognizable symbol of the Indian Diaspora in Hong Kong.
Oman	Shri Kanaksi Gokaldas Khimji	The Khimjis have utilized their proximity to the ruling family in the cause of the Diaspora and strengthening links between India and Oman.
Kenya	Shri Manilal Premchand Chandaria	He has used his resources to propagate Indian ethos and values. He helped set-up Mahatma Gandhi Memorial Academy Society and Gandhi Smarak Nidhi Fund in Kenya.
United Kingdom	Navnit Dholakia, Baron Dholakia	Lord Dholakia made significant contributions in the fields of community care and issues relating to ethnic unrest. He played an important role in addressing the sensitive issue of racial discontent.
United States	Shri Rajat Gupta	Shri Gupta has embarked on work relating to community welfare and social and Philanthropic causes. He played a key-role in the establishment of the Indian School of Business at Hyderabad.
Guyana	Sir Shridath Surendranath Ramphal	Sir Shridath Ramphal is a distinguished Jurist having been Solicitor General and Attorney General of Guyana and Member of International Commission of Jurists. Sir Shridath Ramphal also held positions of responsibility in international organizations such as Independent Commission on International Development Issues, Independent Commission on Disarmament and Security Issues, Independent Commission of International Humanitarian Issues and World Commission on Environment and Development, Chairman UN Committee for Development Planning and President, World. He is a former Secretary General of the Commonwealth of Nations.
Malaysia	Dato’ Seri S. Samy Vellu	Deputy Minister of Local Government and Housing (1978–79); Minister for Works (1979–85) and Minister of Energy, Tele communications & Posts, Malaysia (1989–95). He has been a Member of the House of Representatives of the Malaysian Parliament since 1974.
Canada	Ujjal Dosanjh	In 1991, Shri Dosanjh was elected as Member of the Legislative Assembly in the Vancouver Kensington constituency and then as Caucus Chair. He became the Minister for Human Rights, Multiculturalism, Sports and Immigration in 1995, and then was appointed the Attorney General of British Columbia. In a historic development, he was elected as the 33rd Premier and President of the Executive Council of British Columbia, which is first for a person of Indian origin in Canada.

== Awardees for 2004 ==
Country	Name	Description
United States	Dipak Jain	Dean, Kellogg School of Management
United States	Kalpana Chawla	NASA Astronaut
Zimbabwe	Ahmed Moosa Ebrahim	Supreme Court justice
Guyana	Bharrat Jagdeo	President of Guyana
Fiji	Mahendra Pal Chaudhry	Fmr. Prime Minister of Fiji
Kuwait	Dr. Marian Chisti	
United Kingdom	Lord Meghnad Desai	Economist, Writer, Labour politician
United States	Narinder Singh Kapany	Indian-American physicist who was a pioneer in the field of fiber optics
United States	Shashi Tharoor	Politician, Diplomat, Writer
New Zealand	Sukhi Turner	Fmr. Mayor of Dunedin, New Zealand
India	P. Mohamed Ali	Industrialist

== Awardees for 2005 ==
Country	Name	Description
Hong Kong	M. Arunachalam	President, Asia Pacific India Chambers of Commerce
United States	Jagdish Bhagwati	Indian American economist
South Africa	Amina Cachalia	Women's activist, politician
Tanzania	J.K. Chande	Chancellor, International Medical and Technological University, Dar es Salaam, Tanzania.
Germany	Alokeranjan Dasgupta	Poet, philosopher, academic
South Africa	Ahmed Kathrada	South African anti-apartheid activist
United States	Sunil Khilnani	Political scientist, writer
Trinidad and Tobago	Basdeo Panday	Prime Minister of Trinidad and Tobago
United Kingdom	Bhikhu Parekh	member, British House of Lords
United States	Sam Pitroda	Indian American entrepreneur and Indian communications policymaker
United Kingdom	Vikram Seth	Novelist and poet
United States	M. Night Shyamalan	Indian American film screenwriter, director and producer
Fiji	Vijay Singh	Indo-Fijian golfer
Sri Lanka	A Vijayan	Disaster Search & Rescue - Indian Ocean Tsunami
United States	Sant Singh Virmani	Rice scientist
United Arab Emirates	M. A. Yusuff Ali	Owner of Lulu Group International (Abu Dhabi headquartered Indian conglomerate)

== Awardees for 2006 ==
Country	Name	Description
Thailand	Shivnath Rai Bajaj	
Israel	Eliahu Bezalel	
Mauritius	Abdool Raouf Bundhun	
Philippines	Pratima Kale	
Saudi Arabia	Majid Uddin Kazi	
Qatar	C. K. Menon	
United Kingdom	Gulam Kaderbhai Noon	
United States	Sudhir M. Parikh	
Guyana	Yesu Persaud	
Seychelles	V. Ramadoss	
South Africa	Sisupal Rambharos	
United States	Niranjan S. Shah	
Hong Kong	Rusy M. Shroff	
Singapore	Shan V	
Réunion	Jean-Paul Virapoullé	
United States	Fareed Zakaria	journalist, editor of Newsweek International

== Awardees for 2007 ==
Country	Name	Description	Field of Merit
United States	Gopal Raju	journalist, founder-editor India Abroad	Media
United Kingdom	Lord Diljit Rana	Hon. Consul Belfast, Managing Director Andras House	Business
Canada	Dave Sukhdip Singh Hayer	Member of Legislative Assembly of British Columbia	Public Affairs
United States	Madhavan Anirudhan	President Essen Nutrition	Business
South Africa	Billy Nair	Member of Parliament, ANC South Africa	Public Affairs
Kenya	Pheroze Nowrojee	Advocate, Human Rights Activist	Community Affairs
United States	Nirmal K. Sinha	Community Leader, Significant contribution to fostering friendship between India and USA	Community Affairs
Malaysia	Tan Sri Dato K.R. Somasundram	Executive Chairman, National Land Finance Co-operative Society	Public Affairs
Jamaica	Kenneth S. Benjamin	Founder and chairman of the Guardsman Group	Business
Germany	Sibabrata Roy	President Indo-German Society Hamburg, Promoter of Indian Culture in Germany	Community Affairs
United Arab Emirates	Syed M. Salahuddin	Managing director, ETA-Ascon Group	Business
United Arab Emirates	Bavaguthu Raghuram Shetty	Businessman Pharmaceuticals, Chairman Board of Governors Abu Dhabi Indian School	Business
Fiji	Sir Moti Tikaram	Justice, National President for Fiji, World Jurist Association	Public Affairs
Portugal	Abdool Magid Karim Vakil	President Comunidade Islamica de Lisboa	Business
United States	Panchapakesa Jayaraman	Writer, Promoter of Hindi language and literature	Culture

== Awardees for 2008 ==
Country	Name	Description	Field of Merit
Saudi Arabia	Dr. Mohammed Roshankt	Chairman of TCS-FNS	
Bahrain	Dr. Ravi Pillai	Managing director Nasser Al Hajri Corporation	Business
Mauritius	Dr. Navinchandra Ramgoolam	Prime Minister Mauritius	Public Affairs
Australia	Neville Joseph Roach	Chairman of TCS-FNS	
Japan	A. P. S. Mani	Founder and coordinator of Indian Community Activities in Tokyo	
New Zealand	Judge Ajit Swaran Singh	District Judge in New Zealand	
Saudi Arabia	Dr. Rafiudin Fazulbhoy	Founding member of the Indian school at Jeddah and the Indian Pilgrims' Welfare Forum	
Sweden	Bicky Chakraborty	CEO Elite Hotels, Sweden	
United Arab Emirates	Krishnamurthy Kumar	Founding governor of the Indian Business and Professional Council	
United Kingdom	Lord Karan Bilimoria	Chancellor Thames Valley University	
United States	Dr. Thomas Abraham	Founder chairman Global Organization of People of Indian Origin (GOPIO Inc.)	
United States	Joy Cherian	Commissioner at the United States Equal Employment Opportunity Commission	
Trinidad and Tobago	National Council of Indian Culture	NGO dedicated to the promotion of Indian culture in Trinidad and Tobago	

== Awardees for 2009 ==
Country	Name	Field of Merit
Malaysia	Tan Sri G. Vadiveloo	Community Service
Bahrain	Soman Baby	Community Service
Mauritius	Shri Angidi Chettiar	Public Service
Madagascar	Shri Ylias Akbaraly	Community Service
Netherlands	Shri Ram Lakhina	Community Service
Oman	P. N. C. Menon	Philanthropy
South Africa	Shri Parmananthan ‘Prema’ Naidoo	Public Service
Suriname	Shri Ramdien Sardjoe	Public Service
United Arab Emirates	Shri J. R. Gangaramani	Community Service
United Kingdom	Baroness Shreela Flather	Public Service
United States	Prof C. K. Prahalad	Management
United States	Prof. Sumit Ganguly	Public Service
United States	Dr. Sampatkumar Shidramapa Shivangi	Community Leadership

== Awardees for 2010 ==
Country	Name	Description	Field of Merit
United Arab Emirates	Dr. Azad Moopen	Chairman of Aster DM Healthcare	Healthcare
Qatar	Azim Abbas	Director of Al Sulaiman Jewellery & Watches	Business
Tanzania	Dr. Rajni Kanabar	Work with the Tanzania Heart Babies Project.	Healthcare
Brunei Darussalam	Shri Mohinder Singh Bhullar		Community Service
Fiji	Shri Yanktesh Permal Reddy		Community Service
Japan	Shri Ryuko Hira		Community Service
Japan	Smt Dr. Ruby Umesh Pawankar		Medicine
Oman	Shri Suresh Kumar Virmani		Community Service
South Africa	Shri Pravin Jamnadas Gordhan		Public Service
South Africa	Dr. Tholisiah Perumal Naidoo		Community Service
Thailand	Shri Deepak Mittal		Business
Trinidad & Tobago	Dr. Lenny Krishendath Saith		Public Service
USA	Dr. Mani Lal Bhaumik		Community Service
USA	Shri Ashok Kumar Mago		Community Service
USA	Shri Upendra J. Chivukula		Public Service

== Awardees for 2011 ==
Country	Name	Description	Field of Merit
Australia	Prof. Veena Sahajwalla		Science
Canada	Dr. Rajni Kanabar		Arts
Hong Kong	Shri Harindarpal Singh Banga		Business
Palestine	Sheikh Mohammad Munir Nazir Hassan Ansari		Community Service
Liberia	Shri Upjit Singh Sachdeva		Community Service
Malaysia	Tan Sri Dato’ Ajit Singh		Public Affairs
New Zealand	Sir Anand Satyanand		Public Affairs
Netherlands	Shri Saleh Wahid		Community Service
Qatar	ICBF - Indian Community Benevolent Forum		Community Service
Saudi Arabia	Dr. Mohiaddin Syed Karimuddin	Pediatrician, Jeddah	Community Service
Sri Lanka	Shri Mano Selvanathan		Business
United Arab Emirates	Shri Mohan Jashanmal		Community Service
United Kingdom	Sandip Verma, Baroness Verma		Public Affairs

== Awardees for 2012 ==
Country	Name	Description	Field of Merit
Bahrain	Mr. Plavalil Kizhakkethil Vasudevan Radhakrishna Pillai		
Cambodia	Mr. Sachchidanand Sahai		
Canada	Indo‐Canada Chamber of Commerce		
Côte d'Ivoire	Mr. Deepak Naraindas Shivdasani		
Germany	Mr. Victor Shahid Smetacek		
Indonesia	Mr. Sri Prakash Lohia		
Mozambique	Mr. Jose Parayanken		
Oman	Mr. Kiran Navinchandra Asher		
Qatar	Mr. Hassan Abdulkarim Chougule		
Singapore	Mr. S. R. Nathan — The former President of Singapore		
South Africa	Ms. Khorshed Noshir Ginwala		
Trinidad and Tobago	The Hon. Kamla Persad-Bissessar, Prime Minister of Trinidad and Tobago		
Ukraine	Mr. Rajesh Kumar Saraiya		
United States	Prof. Surendra Kumar Kaushik		
United States	Kalpalatha Kummamuri Guntupalli		

== Awardees for 2013 ==
Country	Name	Description	Field of Merit
Mauritius	H E Mr. Rajkeswur Purryag	The President of the Republic of Mauritius	
United States	Narendra R Kumar	A doctor specialising in otolaryngology head and neck surgery	
United Arab Emirates	KT Rabeeullah	Businessman - Chairman and Managing Director of Shifa Al Jazeera Medical Group Middle East	Community Service
United Arab Emirates	Bava Haji Pandalingal		
India	Patricia Maria Rozario	Music	Contributions in the field of music "Outstanding achievements"
Germany	Professor Gurusharan Singh Chatwal		Science
Guinea	Ashok S. Vaswani,		community service
Malaysia	Tan Sri Ravindran Menon		Community service
Mexico	Dr. Rasik V.Joshi		Literature
New Zealand	Dr.Satendra K.Singh		Community service
Réunion	Gilbert. C. Moutien		Business
South Africa	Ismail E. Ebrahim		Public Services
United States	Subhash Razdan		Public service

== Awardees for 2014 ==
Country	Name	Description	Field of Merit
Australia	Senator Lisa Maria Singh	First member of South Asian descent in Australian Parliament	
Bahrain	Dr Varghese Kurian	Leading overseas Indian businessman	
Canada	Vasdev Chanchlani	Entrepreneur and philanthropist based in	
Fiji	Ramakrishna Mission		
France	Bikas Chandra Sanyal	Renowned educationist	
Netherlands	Satnarainsing Rabin Baldewsingh	Significant contribution to promoting better understanding of India	
Papua New Guinea	Sasindran Muthuvel	First Member of Parliament of Indian origin in Papua	
Saudi Arabia	Shihabudeen VavaKunju	Contributor to welfare of Indian community	
South Africa	Ela Gandhi	Contributions in promoting ties between India and South Africa, and the cause of freedom	
United Arab Emirates	Shamsheer Vayalil	Contribution in field of healthcare business and for promoting etter understanding of India	
United Kingdom	Shailesh Vara	First Indian origin Govt. minister for Conservative Party	
United States	Dr. Parthasarathy Chiramel Pillai	Contributions in field of science, and fostering closer relations between India and USA	
United States	Dr. Renu Khator	One of the first persons of Indian origin to head a higher system and a research university in the United States. Chancellor of the University of Houston System and President of the University of Houston	
United States	Dr. Namita Roy-Chowdhury	First Indian woman to become a full professor at Albert Einstein College of Medicine, New York.	Discoverer of the genetic bases of inherited jaundice (Crigler-Najjar syndrome and Gilbert Syndrome)

== Awardees for 2015 ==
Country	Name	Description	Field of Merit
Australia	Mala Mehta	Founder of Indo- Australian Bal Bharatiya Vidyalaya in Thornleigh suburb in Sydney. Since its establishment, she has been pursuing the growth of Hindi in Australia.	Education & Community Service
Guyana	Donald Rabindranauth Ramotar	President of Guyana and awarded for his work for the Indian diaspora.	Public Service
Mexico	Dr Rajaram Sanjaya	India-born Mexico scientist and winner of the 2014 World Food Prize for developing 480 wheat varieties that have been released in 51 countries.	Scientific Research
New Zealand	Kanwaljit Singh Bakshi	Member of Parliament (MP) from New Zealand. He is also known for his work for the Indian diaspora in New Zealand.	Public Service
Oman	Rajmal Parakh	Leading philanthropist, active in social services and charitable work in Oman and India.	Social Service
Seychelles	Duraikannu Karunakaran	Justice of the Supreme Court of Seychelles	Judicial Service
South Africa	Essop Goolam Pahad	Politician and Minister in the Presidency from 1999 to 2008	Public Service
United Arab Emirates	Shah Bharatkumar Jayantilal	Social worker known for contributions to charities and philanthropy.	Community Service
United Arab Emirates	Ashraf Thamarassery	Social activist	Social Work
Uganda	Mahendra Nanji Mehta	Indian-origin businessman	Public Service
United Kingdom	Nathu Ram Puri	Founder of Purico and awarded for his contributions to the Indian diaspora.	Education & Community Service
United Kingdom	Raj Loomba, Baron Loomba	Philanthropist and founder of clothing company Rinku Group. He is a Liberal Democrat member of the House of Lords	Public Service
United States of America	Satya Nadella	CEO of Microsoft	Business Management
United States of America	Kamlesh Lulla	Chief Scientist for Earth Observation in the Human Exploration Science office at Johnson Space Center at NASA	Scientific Research
United States of America	Nandini Tandon	Awarded for her contributions to life sciences, healthcare and Information technology in USA, India as well as other emerging economies.	Management of Healthcare and Business

== Awardees for 2017 ==
Country	Name	Field of Merit
Australia	Gorur Krishna Harinath	Community Service
Bahrain	V.K. Rajashekharan Pillai	Business
Belgium	Antwerp Indian Association	Community Service
Brunei	Nazeer Ahamed Mohamed Zackiriah	Community Service
Canada	Mukund Purohit	Business
Djibouti	Nalinkumar Sumanlal Kothari	Community Service
Fiji	Vinod Patel	Social Service
France	Raghunath Manet	Arts & Culture
Israel	Lael Anson E. Best	Medical Science
Japan	Sandip Kumar Tagore	Arts & Culture
Libya	Ariful Islam	Community Service
Malaysia	Tan Sri Dato Dr. Muniandy Thambirajah	Education and Community Service
Mauritius	Pravind Jugnauth	Public Service
Portugal	António Costa	Public Service
Qatar	Raghavan Seetharaman	Business Management
Saudi Arabia	Zeenat Musarrat Jafri	Education
Singapore	Singapore Indian Association	Community Service
Sweden	Carani Balaraman Sanjeevi	Medicine
Thailand	Susheel Kumar Saraff	Business
Trinidad and Tobago	Winston Chandarbhan Dookeran	Public Service
United Arab Emirates	Vasudev Shamdas Shroff	Community Service
United Arab Emirates	India Social and Cultural Centre, Abu Dhabi	Philanthropy & Community Service
United Kingdom	Priti Patel	Public Service
United Kingdom	Neena Gill	Public Service
United States of America	Hari Babu Bindal	Environmental Engineering
United States of America	Bharat Haridas Barai	Community Service
United States of America	Nisha Desai Biswal	Public Affairs
United States of America	Mahesh Mehta	Community Service
United States of America	Ramesh Shah	Community Service
United States of America	Sampatkumar Shidramapa Shivangi	Community Leadership

== Awardees for 2019 ==
2019 Awardees
Country of residence	Name	Field of Merit
Australia	Nihal Singh Agar	Social Service
Bhutan	Rajinder Nath Khazanchi	Civil Engineering
Canada	Ramesh Chotai	Business
People's Republic of China	Amit Waikar	Business
Egypt	Indian Community Association in Egypt	Community Service
France	Malini Ranganathan	Academics & Arts
Guyana	Guyana Hindu Dharmic Sabha	Community Service
Italy	Bitthal Das Maheshwari	Business
Jamaica	Guna Sekhar Muppuri	Medical Science & Entrepreneurship
Kenya	P. V. Sambasiva Rao	Technology
Kenya	Prakash Madhavdas Heda	Medical Science
Kuwait	Rajpal Tyagi	Architecture
Myanmar	Satya Narayan Goenka	Business Management
New Zealand	Bhavdeep Singh Dhillon	Business
Norway	Himanshu Gulati	Public Service
Oman	Vinodan Verambally Thazhikuniyil	Business
Poland	Jagdeshwar Rao Maddukuri	Entrepreneurship
Qatar	Purnendu Tiwary	Training & Simulation
South Africa	Anil Sooklal	Diplomacy
South Africa	Swami Saradaprabhananda	Community Service
Switzerland	Rajendra Kumar Joshi	Science
Tanzania	Shamim Parkar Khan	Public Service
United Arab Emirates	Girish Pant	Business
United Arab Emirates	Surender Singh Kandhari	Business
United Arab Emirates	Zulekha Daud	Medical Science & Business
Uganda	Rajesh Chaplot	Chartered Accountancy
United States of America	Chandra Shekhar Mishra	Science
United States of America	Gita Gopinath	Academics
United States of America	Gitesh Jayantilal Desai	Structural Engineering
United States of America	Kiran C Patel	Medical Science

== Awardees for 2021 ==
2021 Awardees
Country of residence	Name	Field of Merit
Armenia	NGO Cultural Diversity for Peaceful Future	Promoting Indian Culture
Azerbaijan	Dr. Rajani Chandra D’Mello	Medicine
Bahrain	Mr. Baburajan Vava Kalluparambil Gopalan	Community Service
Botswana	Mrs. Jamal Ahmad	Business
Cameroon	Mr. Janakiraman Ravikumar	Closer ties with India
Curaçao	Eugene Rhuggenaath	Public Service
Czech Republic	Debashish Chaudhuri	Art and Culture
Ethiopia	Mr. Mohammed Husein Hasanali Sardharwala	Business
Fiji	Sai Prema Foundation	Community Service
Germany	Dr. Balasubramanian Ramani	Education
Hong Kong	Mr. Lal Lokumal Chellaram	Community Service
Japan	Dr. (Prof.) Muralidhar Miryala	Science & Technology
Japan	Mr. Rajib Shaw	Education
Maldives	Mr. Salil Panigrahi	Tourism
Mexico	Dr. Ravi Prakash Singh	Science & Technology
New Zealand	Priyanca Radhakrishnan	Public Service
Nigeria	Indian Cultural Association (ICA)	Community Service
Qatar	Dr. Mohan Thomas Lazarus Pakalomattom	Medicine
France	Jean-Régis Ramsamy	Media & Community Service
Saudi Arabia	Siddeek Ahmed	Business
Sudan	Dr. Anil Kumar Chotalal Mithani	Medicine
Suriname	Chan Santokhi	Public Service
Switzerland	Dr. Shachi Gurumayun	Bio-tech Agronomy
Thailand	Mr. Vashdev Tikamdas Purswani	Business
United Kingdom	Resham Singh Sandhu	Public Service
United States of America	Mr. Arvind Phukan	Environment Technology
United States of America	Ms. Nilu Gupta	Promoting Indian Culture
United States of America	Federation of Indian Associations NY, NJ & CT	Community Service
United States of America	Dr. Sudhakar Jonnalagadda	Medicine
United States of America	Mukesh Aghi	Business

== Awardees for 2023 ==
2023 Awardees
Country of residence	Name	Field of Merit
Australia	Prof. Jagadish Chennupati	Science & Technology/Education
Bhutan	Prof. Sanjeev Mehta	Education
Brazil	Prof. Dilip Loundo	Art & Culture/Education
Brunei Darussalam	Dr. Alexander Maliakel John	Medicine
Canada	Dr. Vaikuntam Iyer Lakshmanan	Community Welfare
Croatia	Mr. Joginder Singh Nijjar	Art & Culture/Education
Denmark	Prof. Ramjee Prasad	Information Technology
Ethiopia	Dr. Kannan Ambalam	Community Welfare
Germany	Dr. Amal Kumar Mukhopadhyay	Community Welfare/Medicine
Guyana	H.E. Dr. Mohamed Irfaan Ali	Politics/Community Welfare
Israel	Ms. Reena Vinod Pushkarna	Business/Community Welfare
Japan	Dr. Maqsooda Sarfi Shiotani	Education
Mexico	Dr. Rajagopal	Education
Poland	Mr. Amit Kailash Chandra Lath	Business/Community Welfare
Republic of Congo	Mr. Parmanand Sukhumal Daswani	Community Welfare
Singapore	Mr. Piyush Gupta	Business
South Africa	Mr. Mohanlal Hira	Community Welfare
South Sudan	Mr. Sanjaykumar Shivabhai Patel	Business/Community Welfare
Sri Lanka	Mr. Sivakumar Nadesan	Community Welfare
Suriname	Dr. Dewanchandrebhose Sharman	Community Welfare
Switzerland	Dr. Archana Sharma	Science & Technology
Trinidad & Tobago	Justice Frank Arthur Seepersad	Community Welfare/Education
UAE	Mr. Siddharth Balachandran	Business/Community Welfare
UK	Mr. Chandrakant Babubhai Patel	Media
USA	Dr. Darshan Singh Dhaliwal	Business/Community Welfare
USA	Mr. Rajesh Subramaniam	Business
Uzbekistan	Mr. Ashok Kumar Tiwary	Business

== Awardees for 2025 ==
2025 Awardees
Country of residence	Name	Field of Merit
Australia	Ajay Rane	Community Service
Austria	Marialena Joan Fernandes	Education
Barbados	Philomena Ann Mohini Harris	Medical Science
Fiji	Swami Sanyuktanand	Community Service
Guyana	Saraswati Vidya Niketan	Community Service
Japan	Lekh Raj Juneja	Science & Technology
Kyrgyzstan	Prem Kumar	Medical Science
Laos	Soukthavy Chowdhury	Business
Malawi	Krishna Savjani	Business
Malaysia	Subramaniam Sathasivam	Politics
Mauritius	Sarita Boodhoo	Community Service
Moldova	Abhaya Kumar	Business
Myanmar	Ram Niwas (Hla Tun)	Education
Romania	Jaggannath Shekhar Asthana	Business
Russia	Hindustani Samaj	Community Service
Russia	Sudha Rani Gupta	Education
Saudi Arabia	Syed Anwar Khursheed	Medical Science
Singapore	Atul Temurnikar	Education
Spain	Robert Masih Nahar	Community Service
Tanzania	Kaushik Laxmidas Ramaiya	Medicine
Trinidad and Tobago	Christine Kangaloo	Public Affairs
United Arab Emirates	Ramakrishnan Sivaswamy Iyer	Business
Uganda	Bonthala Subbaiah Setty Ramesh Babu	Community Service
United Kingdom	Usha Prashar, Baroness Prashar	Politics
United States	Sharad Lakhanpal	Medicine
United States	Sharmila Ford	Community Service
United States	Ravi Kumar Singisetti	Business

== See also ==
- Orders, decorations, and medals of India
