= Bikas C Sanyal =

Indian educator

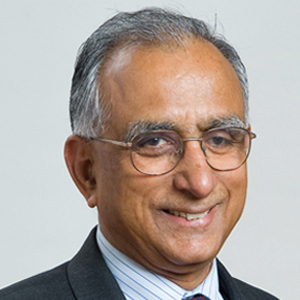
Dr. Bikas C Sanyal

Bikas Chandra Sanyal (Bengali: বিকাশ চন্দ্র সান্যাল; born 15 January 1938) is an Indian educationist, director of the Fondation de la Maison de l'Inde, Cité international universitaire de Paris in Paris. Before assuming this office he was special advisor to the UNESCO Director General and carried on as its adviser until 2014. He served UNESCO International Institute for Educational Planning Paris for three decades. He also served as the Vice Chairperson of UNESCO International Institute for Capacity Building in Africa.

Sanyal is recipient of the highest civilian honor of France Légion d'honneur (from the president of France) and Pravasi Bharatiya Samman (from the President of India). Sanyal has authored a large number of books, reports and monographs.

== Early life and education ==
Sanyal was born in January 1938 in a predominantly rural Islamic community in undivided India. After the partition of India in 1947, he moved to India while his family stayed back in erstwhile East Pakistan and now Bangladesh. Following the usual practice of his family he was sent to Ichapur, West Bengal to live with his uncle for further studies. Due to his excellent academic performance he got a scholarship and admission into the prestigious Presidency College and a place to stay in the Ramakrishna Mission which was founded by Swami Vivekananda. The mission offered him free board and lodging in their Students’ Home in exchange of part-time work with the Home and periodical service in the slum areas of North Calcutta. He organized and administered the Ramakrishna Mission Residential College, Narendrapur, West Bengal during 1960–66. He was awarded the Ph.D. degree in economics from Jadavpur University in 1965. After Ph.D. he joined the Iowa State University, U.S. as a postdoctoral researcher. He married Priti Sanyal in 1966 and has two children, daughter Debarati, now a professor of French in the University of California, Berkeley and son Shayan, a software consultant now stationed in London.

== Career ==
Sanyal joined UNESCO's International Institute for Educational Planning as a faculty in 1969. During his work at the UNESCO IIEP, he worked on the education systems of 77 countries of the world and directed the largest Graduate Employment Survey in the world recorded until 1995. He helped countries of all continents with completely different political systems, to design their higher education strategies. During Cold War, when Poland had a communist regime with central planning system, the Government of Poland, for the first time, accepted the findings of a study under his direction that demonstrated the inadequacy of the central planning system practiced in the Communist world. Poland allowed the results to be published in 1978 within the country. Similarly, he also succeeded in convincing capitalist countries like Philippines and Republic of Korea to change their strategies towards more egalitarian and just distribution of opportunities.

== Contributions to India ==
After retirement from UNESCO in 1998 Dr. Sanyal decided to offer his services free of charge to India thus he took over as the director of the Maison de l’Inde in 1999. He changed the fate of a debt-ridden dilapidated house to a reasonably comfortable maison for the residents and India-loving French community. His wife played a crucial role as the Cultural Attaché of the Maison de L’Inde., She took charge of promoting India's image in the sphere of culture through various activities. Even after retiring, he served as the special advisor to the director general of UNESCO on a one-dollar contract and continued to serve Africa on problems related to higher education. He still serves the International Institute for Capacity Building in Africa for free of charge.

== Honors ==
Legion of Honor or Chevalier de la Légion d'honneur : Dr. Bikas C Sanyal's contribution in the field of higher education development around the world including French speaking countries attracted the attention of the President of the French Republic Mr Jacques Chirac who decorated him with the Chevalier de la Légion d'honneur, the highest civilian honour of France.

Pravasi Bharatiya Samman was awarded to Dr. Sanyal the President of India for the contribution to higher education and culture around the world and enhancing India's image. He considers that Ramakrishna Mission gave him the foundation for intercultural dialogue and the spirit to serve the whole world as one family.

== Major works ==
1. Quality Assurance of Teacher Education in Africa, UNESCO-IICBA 2013
2. Higher Education in the World Reports, (Editor) GUNI and Palgrave Macmillan, 4 volumes, 2005-2008
3. Project Framework for the Strategy for the Development of Education in the Sultanate of Oman 2006- 2020, Sultanate of Oman, Ministry of Higher Education, May, 2004
4. Strategic Action Plan for the Development of Higher Education in Afghanistan (with others), Ministry of Higher Education Afghanistan and International Institute for Educational Planning, Paris, May, 2004
5. Strategic Financial Management in Southern African Universities, UNESCO/International Institute for Educational Planning, Paris, 1999
6. The Reform and Policy of Decentralised management of Higher Education in China (edited), UNESCO/International Institute for Educational Planning, Paris, 1997
7. Innovations in university management, The Unesco Publishing, Paris, 1995, (also available in French)
8. Funding mechanisms of thrust areas of higher education in India (with G.D. Sharma), IIEP, Paris, 1990
9. Technological development and its implications for educational planning, IIEP, Paris, 1990
10. Excellence and evaluation in higher education: some international perspectives 1994
11. The role of the educational system in technological development of electronics/ telecommunications in Indonesia, (with Moegiadi), 1989 IIEP, Paris, 1989
12. Technological development in micro electronics industry and its implication for educational planning in the Republic of Korea 1988
13. Higher education and employment: an international comparative analysis, Falmer Press, United Kingdom, 1987
14. Higher education and employment opportunities in Pakistan, 1987
15. Employment and career opportunities after graduation: a study on the transition from college to work in the Philippines, 1987,
16. From college to work in the Sudan, 1987
17. Higher education and employment in Peoples' Democratic Republic of Yemen, 1985
18. Education and employment of the blind: the case of West Bengal, India, South Asia Publishers Limited, New Delhi, 1985
19. Higher education and employment in the USSR and the Federal Republic of Germany, (with R. Avakov; M. Buttgereit; U. Teichler), UNESCO Press, Paris, 1984.
20. University Education & the Labour Market in the Arab Republic of Egypt (with Abdel Aziz El-Koussy et al.), Pergamon Press, 1982, ISBN 0-08-028-123-0 (Hard Cover)0-08-028122-2 (Flexicover)
21. Higher education and the new international order, 1982 (Also published in French and Arabic)
22. Graduate employment and higher education in West Bengal, India, (with P.K. Bose; S.P. Mukherjee), UNESCO Press, Paris and Wiley Eastern, Delhi, 1983
23. Higher education and employment in the Federal Republic of Germany, (with Ulrich Teichler), UNESCO Press, Paris, 1982
24. Higher education for self reliance: the Tanzanian experience, (with M.J. Kinunda), IIEP, Paris, 1977
25. Higher education and labour market in Zambia expectations and performance, (with J. Case et al.), UNESCO Press, Paris and UNZA, 1976
26. Planning the development of universities, Vol. II, (with V. Onushkin; G. Bartagnon), UNESCO/IIEP, Paris, 1973.
27. On the allocation of resources in a university Department (with Karl Fox and Yakir Plessner), Metroeconomica, Vol. 20 1968-_
