= Siddharth Balachandran =

Indian entrepreneur and philanthropist (born 1976)

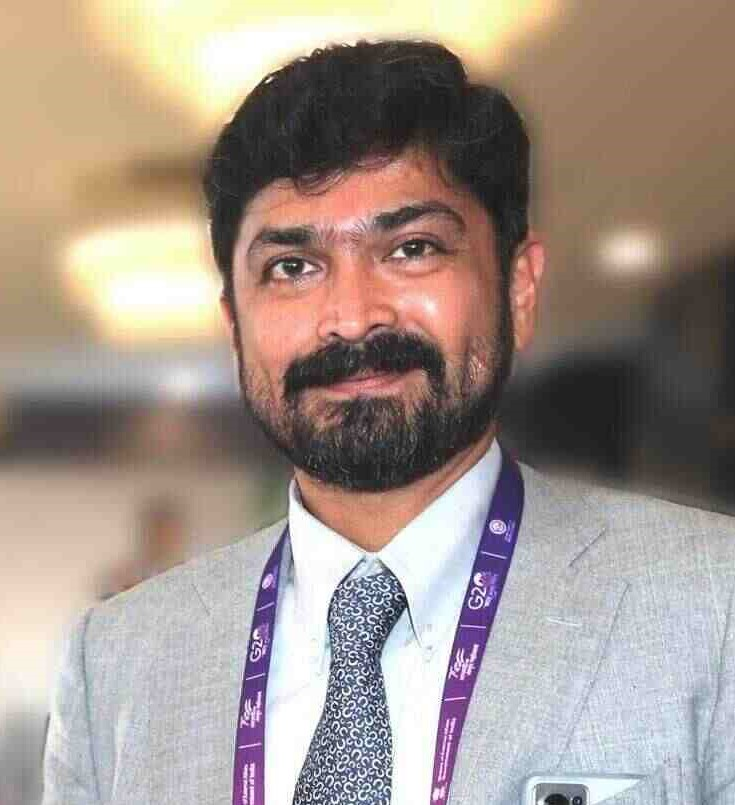
- Born: June 1, 1976 (age 50); Thiruvananthapuram, Kerala, India
- Education: Indian School of Business; PSG Institute of Management Coimbatore; Bapuji Institute of Engineering and Technology
- Occupations: Entrepreneur, philanthropist, investor
- Years active: 1999–present
- Organization: Buimerc Corporation Limited
- Title: Executive Chairman and CEO, Buimerc Corporation
- Parents: R. Balachandran (father); Sabita Varma Balachandran (mother)
- Awards: Pravasi Bharatiya Samman Award (2023)

Siddharth Balachandran (born June 1, 1976) is an Indian investor, philanthropist, and entrepreneur. He serves as executive chairman and chief executive officer of Buimerc Corporation Ltd, an investment holding company based in Dubai International Financial Centre (DIFC), with operations in the United Arab Emirates and India. He holds a 3.01% stake in the Bombay Stock Exchange, the largest individual holding, and 0.38% of the National Stock Exchange of India.

Balachandran began his career in India before moving to the UAE in 2002, where he held leadership positions in the construction material trading sectors. He later established Buimerc Corporation and its subsidiaries. His investments include holdings in financial institutions, education-related companies, and other sectors in India and the Gulf region.

He has served with India Club Dubai, the Indian Business and Professional Council, and the UAE–India Business Council, and has supported education, healthcare and welfare projects through the Buimerc India Foundation and other groups. In 2023, he received the Pravasi Bharatiya Samman Award, the highest honour presented by the Government of India to non-resident Indians for contributions in various fields.

== Early life ==
Siddharth was born on June 1, 1976, in Thiruvananthapuram, Kerala, India, to R. Balachandran, a management professional and entrepreneur, and Sabita Varma Balachandran, a former officer in the Reserve Bank of India. He attended schools in Chennai and Ernakulam before graduating in civil engineering from Bapuji Institute of Engineering and Technology, Mysore University. Later, he pursued a Master's Programme in International Business from PSG Institute of Management, Coimbatore, in collaboration with the Indian Institute of Foreign Trade, New Delhi and completed an Advanced Management Programme at the Indian School of Business, Hyderabad.

== Career ==
Balachandran began his career in 1999 as a strategic accounts manager at Dun & Bradstreet Information Services in Chennai, where he handled banks and financial institutions across South India. He relocated to the United Arab Emirates in 2002 and joined Builders Merchants, a Dubai-based construction-materials firm, contributing to the company's quality certification and expansion to Abu Dhabi.

In 2004 he founded Bumga FZCO in the Jebel Ali Free Zone; the business was later restructured as Buimerc Corporation FZE, continuing to operate from the same location. In 2007 he incorporated Buimerc Corporation Ltd, initially in the British Virgin Islands and subsequently in the DIFC, where he serves as executive chairman and CEO. e company is an investment holding entity with subsidiaries in the UAE and India that holds equity positions in publicly listed companies in both countries. Its portfolio interests also extend to Europe and the United States.

In India, he chairs Buimerc Core Investments, which oversees the group's domestic operations. He is also a director at SB Global Educational Resources, an education services company based in Kerala.

In 2006, Balachandran became vice-chairman of India Club, a Dubai-based organization established in 1964 to support the Indian expatriate community. He later served as the club's chairman. The club offers recreational, cultural, and business facilities to its members.

=== Stock exchange investments ===
Balachandran initially acquired equity positions in the Bombay Stock Exchange (BSE) in 2009. He later acquired shares in the National Stock Exchange of India (NSE) during the 2014-15 period.

According to data from the National Stock Exchange's draft red herring prospectus, Balachandran held 9.315 million NSE shares, representing approximately 0.38 per cent of the exchange's total equity capital, making him the fourth-largest individual shareholder. As of June 2025, his BSE equity holding stood at approximately 8.208 million shares, representing a 3.01 per cent stake. In 2026, he additionally acquired 5.13 million shares in Emirates NBD.

=== Public and industry roles ===
Balachandran has held leadership and advisory positions in several community and business organisations in the UAE. He served as vice-chairman and later chairman of India Club, Dubai, and sits on the board of governors of the People of Indian Origin Chamber of Commerce and Industry in the Gulf Cooperation Council region. He is chairman of the governing board of the Indian Business and Professional Council (IBPC) in Dubai and a founding member of the UAE chapter of the UAE–India Business Council.

== Philanthropic and community involvement ==
During the 2009–2010 economic downturn, Balachandran worked with the Indian Consulate in Dubai to support expatriate families affected by job losses. He has supported various UAE-based organizations, including the Al Jalila Foundation, SmartLife Dubai, KMCC Dubai, Dubai Autism Centre, Science India Forum UAE, Abu Dhabi Centre for Special Needs, Al Noor Training Centre, Rashid Pediatric Centre, and Senses Residential and Day Care Centre for Special Needs. He is affiliated with the Indian Social and Cultural Centre in Abu Dhabi and is a board member of Chinmaya International Residential School in India.

In 2024, Balachandran contributed AED 10 million to the Mothers' Endowment Campaign for global education. Through Buimerc Corporation, he also pledged AED 20 million to the Fathers' Endowment Campaign for the construction of endowment buildings. In 2025, he became a founding trustee of the UAE-India Friendship Hospital, a non-profit initiative developed with the Dubai Health Authority to provide affordable healthcare for low-income workers. The project provides affordable medical care for low-income and blue-collar workers in the UAE. For his contributions, he was awarded the Mohammed bin Rashid Al Maktoum Medal for Philanthropy in 2025.

=== Buimerc India Foundation ===
Buimerc India Foundation, the philanthropic arm of Buimerc Corporation established in 2007 and based in Kochi, undertakes initiatives in education, environmental sustainability, minority welfare, and disaster relief. Its activities include financial assistance for medical treatment, support for persons with special needs, community-infrastructure repairs, and projects related to cultural heritage.

== Awards and recognition ==
In 2011, Siddharth Balachandran was named among the most influential non-resident Indian (NRI) business figures in the Gulf Cooperation Council by Arabian Business. That same year, he was featured in the Indian Power List published in the UAE.

In 2023, he received the Pravasi Bharatiya Samman Award from the President of India, in recognition of his contributions to business and community welfare. This is the highest honour conferred on overseas Indians by the Government of India.

That year, he was also acknowledged during a Diwali event organized by Emirates Loves India and the UAE Government Media Office for his role in business and community engagement.

He received the Mohammed bin Rashid Al Maktoum Medal for Philanthropy in 2025, one of the UAE's highest civilian honours, in recognition of his charitable contributions in both the UAE and India.
