= V.K. Rajashekharan Pillai =

Indian businessman

V.K.Rajasekharan Pillai
- Born: Rajasekharan Pillai; Kuttamperoor, Mannar
- Occupation: Businessman
- Known for: Pravasi Bharatiya Samman Award 2017
- Website: www.vkrajasekharanpillai.com

Valavoor Kizhakkathil Rajasekharan Pillai or VKR Pillai is an Indian businessman from Kuttamperoor, Mannar in Alappuzha district of Kerala, living in Bahrain. He is the Chairman of Bahrain headquartered national group of companies in Bahrain. He has been awarded the Pravasi Bharatiya Samman Award 2017, the highest honor conferred on non-resident Indians by the President of India.

== Awards and achievements ==
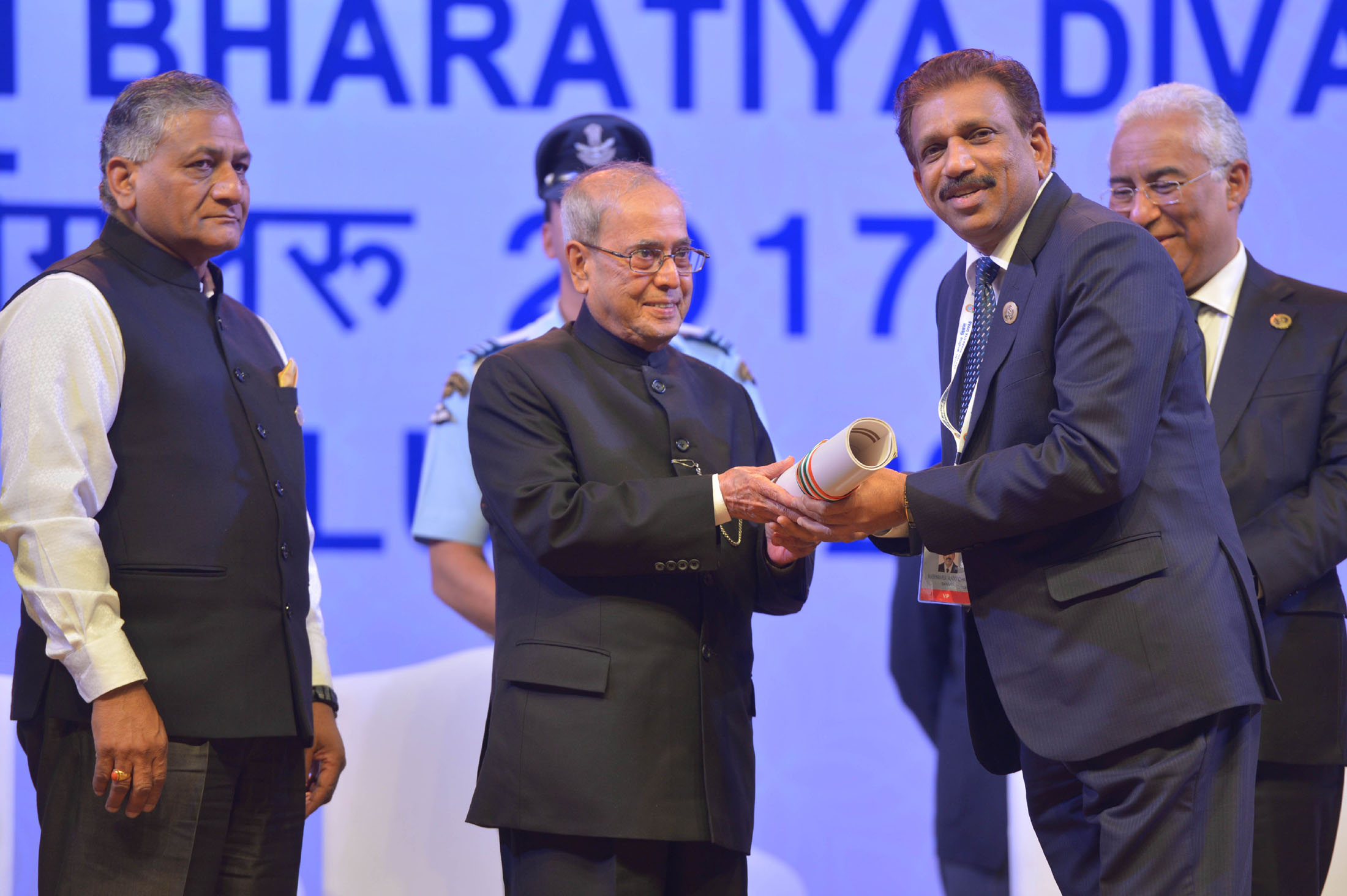
Pillai receives Pravasi Bharatiya Samman from President of India

| Year | Country of residence | Award name | Given by | Field of Merit |
|---|---|---|---|---|
| 2017 | Bahrain | Pravasi Bharatiya Samman | President of India | Business |
