= American Association of Physicians of Indian Origin =

Professional association

The American Association of Physicians of Indian Origin (AAPI) is a professional association for Indian American physicians.

The association is based in Chicago and was founded in 1982. As of 2019, it claims a membership of 80,000 physicians.

== History ==
=== Founding ===
From the 1960s to the 1970s, the United States saw a large influx of medical students and physicians from India who were looking to continue their studies, intern or practice. However, while trying to apply for residencies, promotions, medical licenses, etc., many experienced discrimination and difficulties despite being qualified for these positions. This led to the formation of regional Indian-origin physician organizations such as the Michigan Association of Physicians of Indian Origin (MAPI), which was established in 1976 to support Indian medical graduates in the area. Leaders in organizations across U.S., such as Dr. Navin Shah from Washington D.C., reached out to other organizations proposing that they all come under one national organization, and in 1982, the first national meeting was hosted by MAPI in Dearborn, Michigan. The new organization started out small, with only five organizations at the meeting. During the meeting, they elected people for various leadership positions and drafted a Constitution and Bylaws. AAPI's initial goals thus became to lobby Congress and confront the American Medical Association in order to receive fair treatment.

== Doctors of Indian origin ==
As of 2019, there were about 938,980 active physicians in the US; Indian-origin physicians account for at least 8.5% of the total physician population.

It is noteworthy that India provides the largest number of International Medical Graduates to the US in absolute numbers. More generally, India has been an important source of medical doctors for foreign countries since the 1960s.

Dr. Anjana Samadder, a Gastroenterologist from Ohio, is the organization's president.

== Jagdish Tytler controversy ==
In June 2004, AAPI became involved in a controversy for its invitation to India's then-Minister for Non-Resident Indian Affairs Jagdish Tytler to be honored at a dinner gala. Mr. Jagdish Tytler was controversial because of his alleged involvement in inciting violence during the 1984 anti-Sikh riots that followed the assassination of Prime Minister Indira Gandhi.

Various human rights and Sikh groups threatened to hold demonstrations at the venue and the invitation to Jagdish Tytler was withdrawn. Tytler resigned from the Indian government after being indicted by the official Nanavati Commission of inciting mobs for violence.

== Events ==
American Association of Physicians of Indian Origin organised 15th Annual Global Health Summit as part of 5th Azadi Ka Amrit Mahotsav initiative at Avasa Hotel, Hyderabad, India, during January 2022. Shri Venkaiah Naidu, Hon'ble Vice President of India, was the Chief Guest. At the summit the theme on the benefits of Yoga and Meditation on mental and emotional health was stressed.

== Demographic background and place in American health workforce ==
Physicians and dentists of Indian origin in the United States comprise a disproportionately large portion of the health workforce in comparison with their proportion of the total population. According to national snapshots, Asians are estimated to make up approximately 19% of active physicians, and about 18& of practicing dentists; the Indian Americans are estimated to make up approximately 13% of all physicians in the U.S. although the number of Indians is very low.

This trend has been attributed by scholars to a number of structural factors taken over the long term. The Immigration and Nationality Act of 1965 also eliminated national-origin quotas, enlarged family-based and employment-based immigration, which opened the doors to highly educated professionals in India. The established credentialing systems like Educational Commission for Foreign Medical Graduates (ECFMG) certification and the United States Medical licensing exam (USMLE) certification and licensure of physicians and the Integrated National Board Dental Examination (INBDE) and advanced-standing programs provided easy but challenging paths to the Indian medical and dental schools to the U.S. residency, licensure and practice.

These pipelines were also reinforced by economic incentives and community networks. High wage disparities, clinician demand (especially in primary care and underserved communities), and a high education achievement level among most Indian American families stimulated future generations of Indian Americans to pursue medicine and dentistry. In the long-term, the distribution of information about the examinations, residency applications, licensure requirements, and practice opportunities has been shared by dense professional and social networks: alumni associations, regional organizations, national organizations, such as the American Association of Physicians of Indian Origin. These networks have contributed to making individual migration and training pathways permanent and intergenerational pipelines of the Indian-origin physicians and dentists in the United States.
