= List of Padma Shri award recipients in other fields =

Recipients of a civilian award in India

This is a list of recipients of the Padma Shri award, the fourth-highest civilian award of the Republic of India, in the Others category. As of 2025, a total of 134 individuals have been awarded Padma Shri for their contributions in this field.

== 1950–1959 ==
Year	Name	State	Field
1959	Ghulam Yazdani	Andhra Pradesh	Others

== 1960-1969 ==
Year	Name	State	Field
1961	Kartar Singh Dewana	Punjab	Others
1961	Vithalrao Eknathrao Vikhe Patil	Maharashtra	Others
1962	Natthi Singh	Uttar Pradesh	Others
1968	Narendra Singh Dev	Madhya Pradesh	Others
1968	Shamrao Sakharamrao Kadam	Maharashtra	Others

== 1970–1979 ==
Year	Name	State	Field
1971	Sukharam Abaji Patil	Maharashtra	Others
1971	Surya Deo Singh	Rajasthan	Others
1971	Zafar Futehally	Maharashtra	Others
1975	Arjan Singh	Uttar Pradesh	Others
1977	Rana Moti Singh	Punjab	Others

== 1980–1989 ==
Year	Name	State	Field
1981	Madhav Dhananjaya Gadgil	Karnataka	Others
1986	Anil Kumar Agarwal	Delhi	Others
1986	Avdhesh Kaushal	Uttarakhand	Others
1986	Chandi Parsad Bhatt	Uttarakhand	Others
1986	Govind Bhimacharya Joshi	Karnataka	Others

== 1990–1999 ==
Year	Name	State	Field
1990	Rajinder Singh	Himachal Pradesh	Others
1990	(Smt.) Gisela Bonn	Germany	Others
1990	Inder Sharma	Delhi	Others
1991	Bharat Bhushan	Uttar Pradesh	Others
1992	Goro Koyama	Japan	Others
1992	Bratindra Nath Mukherjee	West Bengal	Others
1992	Alfred Georg Wuerfel	Delhi	Others
1992	Jagjit Singh Hara	Punjab	Others
1992	Kailash Singh Sankhala	Rajasthan	Others
1992	Shanti Lal Jain	Delhi	Others
1999	Ramkinker Upadhyay	Uttar Pradesh	Others

== 2000–2009 ==
Year	Name	State	Field
2000	Anil Kumar Agarwal	Delhi	Others
2000	Aloysius Prakash Fernandez	Karnataka	Others
2000	Dina Nath Malhotra	Delhi	Others
2001	Rajendra Kumar Pachauri	Delhi	Others
2003	Tekkatte Narayan Shanbhag	Maharashtra	Others
2005	Chandi Prasad Bhatt	Uttarakhand	Others
2005	Sunita Narain	Delhi	Others
2006	Air Com. Jasjit Singh	Haryana	Others
2006	Arjan Singh	Uttar Pradesh	Others
2007	Lalit Pande	Uttarakhand	Others
2007	Rabinder Gokaldas Ahuja	Maharashtra	Others
2007	Tarla Dalal	Maharashtra	Others
2008	Sunita Williams	United States of America	Others
2008	Jasdev Singh	Delhi	Others
2008	Haji Kaleem Ullah Khan	Uttar Pradesh	Others
2009	Sunderlal Bahuguna	Uttarakhand	Others
2009	Lt.Gen. (Retd.) Satish Nambiar	Delhi	Others
2009	Syed Iqbal Hasnain	Delhi	Others
2009	Ameen Sayani	Maharashtra	Others
2009	Surinder Mehta	Delhi	Others

== 2010–2019 ==
Year	Name	State	Field
2010	Ranjit Bhargava	Uttarakhand	Others
2011	Om Prakash Agrawal	Uttar Pradesh	Others
2011	Prof.(Dr) Madhukar Keshav Dhavalikar	Maharashtra	Others
2011	Gulshan Nanda	Delhi	Others
2011	Shanti Teresa Lakra	Andaman And Nicobar Islands	Others
2012	Kota Ullas Karanth	Karnataka	Others
2012	Katragadda Paddayya	Maharashtra	Others
2012	Kartikeya V. Sarabhai	Gujarat	Others
2012	Swapan Guha	Rajasthan	Others
2012	T. Vengadapathi Reddiar	Puducherry	Others
2013	Ravindra Singh Bisht	Uttar Pradesh	Others
2013	Ritu Kumar	Delhi	Others
2014	Bellur Krishnamachar Sundararaja Iyengar	Maharashtra	Others
2014	Wendell Augustine Rodricks	Goa	Others
2015	Shivakumara Swamigalu	Karnataka	Others
2015	Swami Satyamitranand Giri	Uttarakhand	Others
2015	Chewang Norphel	Jammu and Kashmir	Others
2015	Jadav Payeng	Assam	Others
2015	Jagat Guru Amrta Suryananda Maha Raja	Portugal	Others
2015	Thegtse Rinpoche	Arunachal Pradesh	Others
2016	Sri Sri Ravi Shankar	Karnataka	Others
2016	Hafeez Sorabe Contractor	Maharashtra	Others
2016	Dayananda Saraswati (Posthumous)	Uttarakhand	Others
2016	Swami Tejomayananda	Maharashtra	Others
2016	H. R. Nagendra	Karnataka	Others
2016	Mohammed Imtiaz Qureshi	Maharashtra	Others
2016	Predrag K. Nikic	Serbia	Others
2016	Ravindra Kumar Sinha	Bihar	Others
2016	Piyush Pandey	Maharashtra	Others
2016	Simon Oraon	Jharkhand	Others
2016	Subhash Palekar	Maharashtra	Others
2016	Zhang Hui Lan	United States of America	Others
2017	Sadhguru Jagadish Vasudev	Tamil Nadu	Others
2017	Jainacharya Vijay Ratnasunderi Maharaja	Gujarat	Others
2017	Swami Niranjanananda Saraswati	Bihar	Others
2017	Arun Kumar Sharma	Chhattisgarh	Others
2017	Sanjeev Kapoor	Maharashtra	Others
2017	Asoke Kumar Bhattacharyya (Posthumous)	West Bengal	Others
2017	Genabhai Darghabhai Patel	Gujarat	Others
2017	Meenakshi P	Kerala	Others
2018	Philipose Mar Chrysostom Mar Thoma Valiya Metropolitan	Kerala	Others
2018	Ramachandran Nagaswamy	Tamil Nadu	Others
2018	Narayan Das	Rajasthan	Others
2018	V Nanammal	Tamil Nadu	Others
2018	Most Venerable Dr. Nguyen Tien Thien	Vietnam	Others
2018	Romulus Whitaker	Tamil Nadu	Others
2018	Bounlap Keokangna	Laos	Others
2018	Nouf Almarwaai	Saudi Arabia	Others
2018	His Holiness Shri Somdet Phra Ariyavamsagatanana	Thailand	Others
2019	Bangaru Adigalar	Tamil Nadu	Others
2019	Dilip Chakrabarti	Delhi	Others
2019	Kanwal Singh Chauhan	Haryana	Others
2019	Babulal Dahiya	Madhya Pradesh	Others
2019	Rajkumari Devi	Bihar	Others
2019	Vallabhbhai Vasrambhai Marvaniya	Gujarat	Others
2019	Muhammed K K	Kerala	Others
2019	Jagdish Prasad Pareek	Rajasthan	Others
2019	Bimal Hasmukh Patel	Gujarat	Others
2019	Hukumchand Patidar	Rajasthan	Others
2019	Tao Porchon-Lynch	United States of America	Others
2019	Kamala Pujari	Odisha	Others
2019	Narender Singh	Haryana	Others
2019	Sultan Singh	Haryana	Others
2019	Sharada Srinivasan	Karnataka	Others
2019	Bharat Bhushan Tyagi	Uttar Pradesh	Others
2019	Ram Saran Verma	Uttar Pradesh	Others
2019	Brahmasree Visudhananda Swami	Kerala	Others
2019	Yadlapalli Venkateswara Rao	Andhra Pradesh	Others

== 2020–2025 ==
Year	Name	State	Field
2020	Shri Vishwesha Theertha Swamiji (Posthumous)	Karnataka	Others
2020	Mumtaz Ali (Sri M)	Kerala	Others
2020	Balkrishna Doshi	Gujarat	Others
2020	Prof.(Dr.) Enamul Haque	Bangladesh	Others
2020	Rahibai Soma Popere	Maharashtra	Others
2020	Chinthala Venkat Reddy	Telangana	Others
2020	Radhamohan (Posthumous) and Kumari Sabarmatee (Duo)	Odisha	Others
2020	Bata Krushna Sahoo	Odisha	Others
2020	Trinity Saioo	Meghalaya	Others
2021	Maulana Wahiduddin Khan (Posthumous)	Delhi	Others
2021	Braj Basi Lal	Delhi	Others
2021	Syed Kalbe Sadiq (Posthumous)	Uttar Pradesh	Others
2021	M. Ali Manikfan	Lakshadweep	Others
2021	Nanadro B Marak	Meghalaya	Others
2021	Rangammal alias Pappmmal	Tamil Nadu	Others
2021	Prem Chand Sharma	Uttarakhand	Others
2021	Chandrashekhar Singh	Uttar Pradesh	Others
2022	Madhur Jaffrey	United States of America	Others
2022	Sosamma Iype	Kerala	Others
2022	Abdulkhadar Imamsab Nadakattin	Karnataka	Others
2022	Amai Mahalinga Naik	Karnataka	Others
2022	His Eminence 12th Guru Tulku Rinpoche	Arunachal Pradesh	Others
2022	Sethpal Singh	Uttar Pradesh	Others
2022	Swami Sivananda	Uttar Pradesh	Others
2022	Sadguru Brahmeshanand Acharya Swami	Goa	Others
2023	Balkrishna Doshi (Posthumous)	Gujarat	Others
2023	H H Tridandi Chinna Jeeyar Swami	Telangana	Others
2023	Kamlesh D. Patel	Telangana	Others
2023	Sukama Acharya	Haryana	Others
2023	Raman Cheruvayal	Kerala	Others
2023	Pataet Kumar Sahu	Odisha	Others
2023	Nek Ram Sharma	Himachal Pradesh	Others
2023	Kushok Thiksey Nawang Chamba Stanzin	Ladakh	Others
2023	S Subbaraman	Karnataka	Others
2023	Tularam Upreti	Sikkim	Others
2024	Togdan Rinpochey (Posthumous)	Ladakh	Others
2024	Sarbeswar Basumatary	Assam	Others
2024	Sathyanarayana Beleri	Kerala	Others
2024	K. Chellammal	Andaman And Nicobar Islands	Others
2024	Charlotte Chopin	France	Others
2024	Chitta Ranjan Debbarma	Tripura	Others
2024	Yanung Jamoh Lego	Arunachal Pradesh	Others
2024	Shri. Sanjay Anant Patil	Goa	Others
2024	Kiran Labhshanker Vyas	France	Others
2024	Monkombu Sambasivan Swaminathan (Posthumous)	Tamil Nadu	Others
2025	Kailash Nath Dikshit	Delhi	Others
2025	Baijnath Maharaj	Rajasthan	Others
2025	Chandrakant Sompura	Gujarat	Others
2025	Hariman Sharma	Himachal Pradesh	Others
2025	Jonas Masetti	Brazil	Others
2025	K. Damodaran	Tamil Nadu	Others
2025	L Hangthing	Nagaland	Others
2025	Lama Lobzang (Posthumous)	Ladakh	Others
2025	Subhash Khetulal Sharma	Maharashtra	Others
2025	Swami Pradiptananda (Kartik Maharaj)	West Bengal	Others
2025	Vijay Nityanand Surishwar Ji Maharaj	Bihar	Others
