= Venkat Reddy =

Venkat Reddy may refer to:

- Komatireddy Venkat Reddy, an Indian party legislator
- Venkat K. Reddy, the chancellor of the University of Colorado Colorado Springs
- Chintala Venkat Reddy, an Indian innovative organic farmer
