= Mynampally Rohit =

Indian politician

Mynampally Rohith MLA
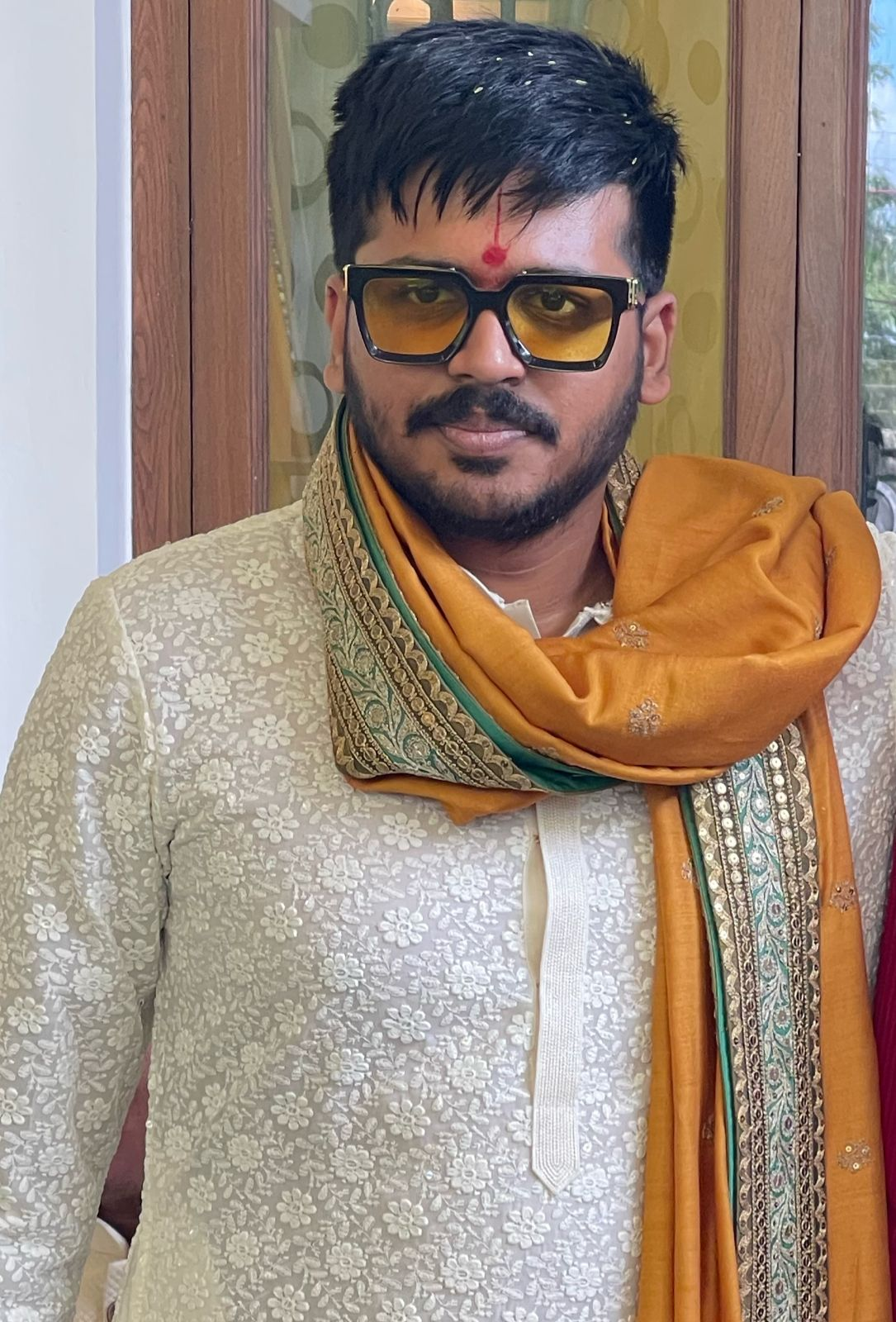

Member of Telangana Legislative Assembly
- Incumbent
- Assumed office 3 December 2023
- Preceded by: Padma Devender Reddy
- Constituency: Medak

Personal details
- Born: November 1, 1997 (age 28) Hyderabad, Andhra Pradesh (present-day Telangana), India
- Party: Indian National Congress
- Spouse: M. Shivani (m. 2020)
- Children: M. Kriyansh
- Parents: Mynampally Hanumanth Rao (father); M. Vani (mother)
- Education: MBBS - MediCiti Institute of Medical Sciences
- Website: mynampallyrohit.com

Mynampally Rohith (born 1 November 1997) is an Indian politician, one of the youngest Members of Legislative Assembly in India representing Medak, Telangana Legislative Assembly. He is also the Chairman of Mynampally Social Service Organisation.

== Early life and education ==
Rohith was born in Hyderabad, Andhra Pradesh (presently, Telangana) into a political family on 1 November 1997. The eldest son to Shri Mynampally Hanumanth Rao an Indian politician, a senior leader in Telangana politics. Rohith completed his MBBS from MediCiti Institute of Medical Sciences in 2020.

He was awarded two gold medals during MBBS for being in merit list by the then Governor of Telangana, Tamilisai Soundararajan, one in Obstetrics and Gynaecology and the other in Paediatrics.

== Social service ==
Rohith founded an organization called Mynampally Social Service Organization and runs various social service programs. He provided financial and basic necessities to the poor during the coronavirus pandemic through his organization.

Recognising his services, in 2023 he was awarded as International Youth Icon by Asia One Magazine.

== Personal life ==
Rohith is married to Shivani (m. 2020), and the couple has a son.
