= Hukumchand =

Hukumchand is a name. Notable people with the name include:

- Hukumchand Patidar (fl. 2018), Indian farmer
- Seth Hukumchand (1874–1959), Indian industrialist
