= Mynampally Hanumanth Rao =

Indian politician

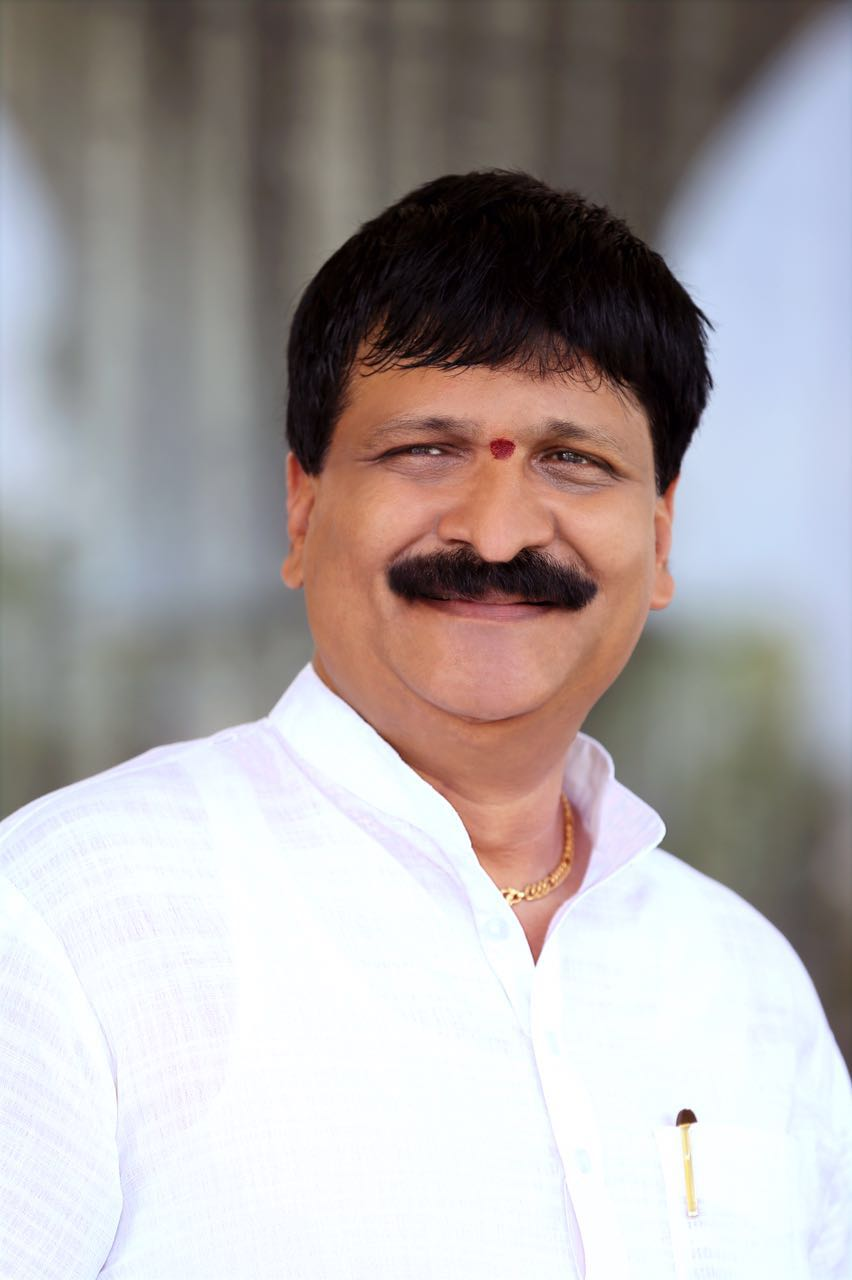
- Hanumanth Rao

Member of Legislative Assembly, Telangana
- In office 12 December 2018 – 2023
- Preceded by: C. Kanaka Reddy
- Succeeded by: Marri Rajasekhar Reddy
- Constituency: Malkajgiri

Member of Legislative Council, Telangana
- In office 2017–2018

Member of Legislative Assembly, Andhra Pradesh
- In office 2009–2014
- Preceded by: P. Shashidhar Reddy
- Succeeded by: Padma Devender Reddy
- Constituency: Medak
- In office 2008–2009
- Constituency: Ramayampet

Personal details
- Party: Indian National Congress (since 2023)
- Other political affiliations: Bharat Rashtra Samithi (2014–2023); Telugu Desam Party (2008–2014)
- Spouse: Vani
- Children: 2 including Mynampally Rohit
- Parents: Kishan Rao (father); Sarojini (mother)

Mynampally Hanumanth Rao is an Indian politician affiliated with the Indian National Congress. He served as a member of the Telangana Legislative Assembly for Malkajgiri from 2018 to 2023. Previously, he represented Ramayampet and Medak in the Andhra Pradesh Legislative Assembly and served as a member of the Telangana Legislative Council.

== Political career ==
=== Early political career ===
Hanumanth Rao was elected to the Andhra Pradesh Legislative Assembly from Ramayampet in a 2008 by-election as a candidate of the Telugu Desam Party (TDP). In the 2009 Andhra Pradesh Legislative Assembly election, he was elected from Medak, defeating Indian National Congress candidate P. Shashidhar Reddy.

In the 2014 Indian general election, he contested the Malkajgiri Lok Sabha constituency as a candidate of the Telangana Rashtra Samithi (TRS), now known as the Bharat Rashtra Samithi (BRS). He finished second to Ch. Malla Reddy of the Telugu Desam Party.

=== Legislative Council and Telangana Assembly ===
In March 2017, Hanumanth Rao was elected unopposed to the Telangana Legislative Council through the Legislative Assembly members' quota.

In the 2018 Telangana Legislative Assembly election, he contested the Malkajgiri Assembly constituency on a TRS ticket. He received 114,149 votes and defeated N. Ramchander Rao of the Bharatiya Janata Party by a margin of 73,698 votes.

=== Indian National Congress ===
On 22 September 2023, Hanumanth Rao announced his resignation from the Bharat Rashtra Samithi ahead of the 2023 Telangana Legislative Assembly election.

On 28 September 2023, he joined the Indian National Congress in New Delhi in the presence of party president Mallikarjun Kharge. His son Mynampally Rohit also joined the party.

He contested the Malkajgiri Assembly constituency as a Congress candidate in the 2023 election. He received 75,519 votes and was defeated by Marri Rajasekhar Reddy of the BRS, who received 125,049 votes. The margin of defeat was 49,530 votes.

=== Social and philanthropic activities ===
Mynampally Hanumanth Rao is identified as the founder of the Mynampally Social Service Organization (MSSO), a social welfare organization based in Telangana. According to its official website, MSSO was established in 1997 and undertakes charitable activities relating to education, healthcare, food distribution and community welfare. The organization identifies his son, Mynampally Rohit, as its chairman.

=== Water access and community assistance ===
Through MSSO, Hanumanth Rao and other members of the organization have been involved in social welfare activities across Telangana. According to the organization, its early initiatives included drilling borewells in areas such as Nizamabad, Medchal and Alwal to improve access to water. The organization also reports supplying drinking water through tankers to communities experiencing water shortages.

MSSO has undertaken food distribution and financial assistance programmes intended to support disadvantaged families, widows, people with disabilities and elderly residents. Its reported activities include providing meals to orphans and people experiencing homelessness, distributing clothing and blankets, and offering financial assistance for medical treatment.

=== Pandemic relief and civic initiatives ===
During the COVID-19 pandemic, Hanumanth Rao and Rohit participated in relief activities involving the distribution of food and essential supplies. On 27 May 2020, Telugu news outlet V6 Velugu reported that they distributed essential goods to disadvantaged residents at Lakshmi Sai Garden in Malkajgiri during the lockdown.

The organization also reports providing free ambulance services, donating CCTV cameras for public safety and undertaking sanitation activities in Malkajgiri during the pandemic.

In September 2023, Deccan Chronicle reported that Rohit had provided monetary and medical assistance during the pandemic and had subsequently initiated fixed deposits for orphans in Medak.

Hanumanth Rao has also been associated with local civic initiatives. According to his official website, these included requesting the cleaning of Safilguda Lake, supporting sanitation activities, organizing book donation drives and providing educational materials and financial assistance to residents in need.

== Electoral history ==
Year	Constituency	Party	Votes	Opponent		Result	Margin
2008 (By-election)	Ramayampet	TDP	56,120	TRS	Padma Devender Reddy	Won	+10,124
2009	Medak	TDP	55,648	INC	P. Shashidhar Reddy	Won	+21,151
2014	Malkajgiri	TRS	495,190	TDP	Ch. Malla Reddy	Lost	−28,166
2017 (MLC)	MLAs' quota	TRS	Won unopposed				
2018	Malkajgiri	TRS	114,149	BJP	N. Ramchander Rao	Won	+73,698
2023	Malkajgiri	INC	75,519	BRS	Marri Rajasekhar Reddy	Lost	−49,530
