= Tekkatte Narayan Shanbhag =

Indian scholar (1925–2009)

- Born: 1925; Thekkatte, Mangalore, Karnataka, India
- Died: 27 February 2009 (aged 83–84); Mumbai
- Occupation: Scholar
- Spouse: Asha
- Children: a son and a daughter
- Awards: Padma Shri; Netaji Subhash Chandra Bose National Award; ABI Man of the Year
- Website: web site

Tekkatte Narayan Shanbhag (1925-2009) was an Indian scholar, bookseller and the founder of Strand Book Stores. He was credited with working to transform bookselling into a personal experience, prompting the writer Kushwant Singh, on a BBC show, to call Strand the only personal book shop in India. He was honoured by the Government of India in 2003 with Padma Shri, the fourth highest Indian civilian award.

== Biography ==
Thekkatte Narayan Shanbhag was born in 1925 in Thekkate, a hamlet near Mangalore, in the Indian state of Karnataka to a wealthy grocer. His father died when Shanbhag was aged just over two and he had a difficult childhood. Unable to pay for the school fees, he appeared for and passed a scholarship examination which paid for his further school education. Later, he took up a part-time job and joined St. Xavier's College, Mumbai where he completed his graduate studies.

With a passion for books, he started his career in 1948 by opening a small kiosk to sell books at the Strand Cinema, Mumbai, a cinema showing mostly Hollywood movies. After initial struggles, business began to pick up and Shanbhag moved the book shop in 1953 to a larger space in Fort, Mumbai. He was reported to have interacted with the customers on a personal level and several dignitaries such as Sir Ambalal Sarabhai, Mirza Ismail, then Diwan of Mysore, T. T. Krishnamachari, Y. B. Chavan and Jawaharlal Nehru were known to have become his customers. He was known to be first bookseller in India to break the Net Book Agreement of 1900 by offering a 20 percent discount on the published prices and allowed customers to have unhindered browsing at his shops. The experience is reported to have expanded his customer base which included A. P. J. Abdul Kalam, J. R. D. Tata, Khushwant Singh, V. S. Naipaul, Soli Sorabjee, N. R. Narayana Murthy, Nani Palkhivala, G. D. Birla, Keshub Mahindra and Azim Premji.

Shanbhag died, aged 85, at his residence in Mumbai, Maharashtra on 27 February 2009.

== Awards and recognitions ==
The Government of India honoured him with the civilian award of Padma Shri in 2003. In 2006, he received Netaji Subash Chandra Bose National Award. Face to Face with Indian Publishing Professionals, a book by S. K. Ghai, has dedicated a chapter on Shanbhag.

== See also ==
- Net Book Agreement
