= Panbari, Chirang =

Village in Chirang district, Assam, India

Coordinates: 26°37′08″N 90°50′02″E

Panbari is a village in Chirang district, Assam, India. It is located within the Bodoland Territorial Region.

== Demographics ==
According to the 2011 Census of India, Panbari had a population of 443 across 79 households. Of these, 222 were male and 221 female, giving a sex ratio of 995 females per 1,000 males, above the Assam state average of 958. Children aged 0–6 numbered 52, with a child sex ratio of 793 females per 1,000 males.

== Notable people ==
- Sarbeswar Basumatary, a farmer and Padma Shri (2024) recipient
