= Malkajgiri Assembly constituency =

Constituency of the Telangana legislative assembly in India

Malkajgiri
- Constituency No. 44 for the Telangana Legislative Assembly
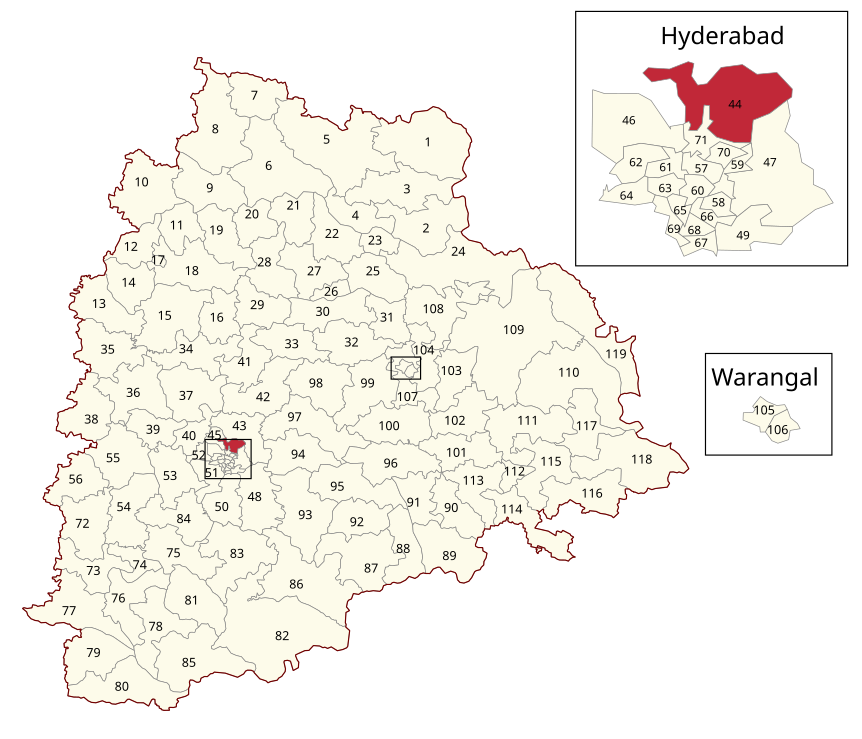
- Location of Malkajgiri Assembly constituency within Telangana

Constituency details
- Country: India
- Region: South India
- State: Telangana
- District: Medchal-Malkajgiri district
- Lok Sabha constituency: Malkajgiri
- Established: 2008
- Total electors: 4,46,678
- Reservation: None

Member of Legislative Assembly
- 3rd Telangana Legislative Assembly
- Incumbent Marri Rajasekhar Reddy
- Party: TRS
- Elected year: 2023

Malkajgiri Assembly constituency is a constituency of Telangana Legislative Assembly, India. It is one of 14 constituencies in Ranga Reddy district. It is part of Malkajgiri Lok Sabha constituency. It is also one of the 24 constituencies of GHMC.

Marri Rajasekhar Reddy of Telangana Rashtra Samithi is currently representing the constituency.

== Neighbourhoods under this Constituency ==
Neighbourhood
Malkajgiri
Safilguda
Moula Ali
Vinayak Nagar
Kakatiya Nagar
East Anandbagh
Gowtham nagar
Neredmet
Sainikpuri
Alwal
Yapral
Macha Bollar

== Members of Legislative Assembly ==
Duration	Member	Political party
Andhra Pradesh
2009–14	Akula Rajender	Indian National Congress
Telangana
2014–2018	C. Kanaka Reddy	Telangana Rashtra Samithi
2018–2023	Mynampally Hanumanth Rao	Telangana Rashtra Samithi
2023-	Marri Rajasekhar Reddy	Bharat Rashtra Samithi

== Election results ==
=== 2023 ===
2023 Telangana Legislative Assembly election: Malkajgiri
Party	Candidate	Votes	%	±%
BRS	Marri Rajasekhar Reddy	125,049	47.12	−8.37
INC	Mynampally Hanmanth Rao	75,519	28.45	New
BJP	N. Ramchander Rao	55,427	20.88	
NOTA	None of the Above	2608	0.98	
Majority		49,530		
Turnout		2,65,616	54.29	
BRS hold		Swing		

=== 2018 ===
2018 Telangana Legislative Assembly election: Malkajgiri
Party	Candidate	Votes	%	±%
TRS	Mynampally Hanmanth Rao	114,149	55.49	+21.70
BJP	N. Ramchander Rao	40,451	19.31	−12.90
TJS	Kapilavai Dileep Kumar	34,219	16.33	New
NOTA	None of the Above	3,391	1.62	
Majority		73,698	35.80	+34.60
Turnout		2,09,499	53.19	
TRS hold		Swing		

=== Telangana Legislative Assembly election, 2014 ===
Telangana Assembly Elections, 2014: Malkajgiri (Assembly constituency)
Party	Candidate	Votes	%	±%
TRS	C. Kanaka Reddy	77,132	33.42%	
BJP	N.Ramchander Rao	74,364	32.22%	
INC	Nandhikanti Sridhar	37,201	16.12%	
YSRCP	G Surya Narayana Reddy	14,828	6.42%	
LSP	Dilip Sankarreddy	12,121	5.25%	
Majority		2,768	1.2%	
Turnout		2,30,823	51.7%	
TRS gain from INC		Swing		

=== Andhra Pradesh Legislative Assembly election, 2009 ===
Andhra Pradesh Assembly Elections, 2009: Malkajgiri (Assembly constituency)
Party	Candidate	Votes	%	±%
INC	Akula Rajender	56,628	29.51%	
PRP	C. Kanaka Reddy	47,434	24.72%	
TDP	Sharada Mahesh V	47,326	24.66%	
Majority		9,194		
INC gain from PRP		Swing		

== See also ==
- Malkajgiri
- List of constituencies of Telangana Legislative Assembly
