= Karnam Ramachandra Rao =

Indian politician

Karnam Ramachandra Rao (1940 – 14 May 2002) was an Indian politician from Andhra Pradesh. He was a five time former member of Andhra Pradesh Legislative Assembly from the Medak Assembly constituency representing the Telugu Desam Party. He was a minister in the NT Rama Rao cabinet in 1985 and 1994. Later, he also served as a minister in the Chandrababu Naidu cabinet in 1999.

== Early life ==
Rao was from Kothapalli village, Papannapet mandal, Medak district, Andhra Pradesh.

== Career ==
Rao became an MLA for the first time winning the Medak Assembly constituency in the 1972 Andhra Pradesh Legislative Assembly election as an independent candidate. Later, he joined the Indian National Congress but lost the 1978 Andhra Pradesh Legislative Assembly election on a Congress ticket. He polled 16,022 votes and lost to Seri Lakshma Reddy of the Indian National Congress (Indira) by 18,442 votes. He won again as an independent candidate in the 1983 Andhra Pradesh Legislative Assembly election, where he polled 30,950 votes and defeated his nearest rival, Seri Lakshma Reddy of the Congrss, by 1,564 votes. Later, he joined the Telugu Desam Party and contested the Medak seat on TDP ticket in the 1985 Andhra Pradesh Legislative Assembly election. In 1985, he polled 45,320 votes and beat his closest opponent, M. N Laxminarayan of the Indian National Congress, by 20,810 votes. He lost the next election in 1989 to Patlola Narayana Reddy of the Congress by 9,953 votes.

He bounced back winning two more consecutive elections in 1994 and 1999. In the 1994 Andhra Pradesh Legislative Assembly election, he polled 58,307 votes and beat P. Narayan Reddy of the Indian National Congress by 27,537 votes. He retained the medak seat for the Telugu Desam Party in the 1999 Andhra Pradesh Legislative Assembly election where he garnered 62,216 votes and defeated P.J. Vittal Reddy of the INC by 20,168 votes.

=== Death ===
Rao died on 14 May 2002 at Nizam''s Institute of Medical Sciences (NIMS), Hyderabad after a two-month respiratory illness. He last rites were held at Kothapalli the next day.
