= Lang Law =

Informal name given to French law relating to book prices

Lang Law is the informal name given to French law number 81-766, from 10 August 1981, which establishes a fixed price for books sold in France and limits price discounts on them. The law is named after Jack Lang, the French Minister of Culture responsible for creating the law.

== Background ==
Until 1979 fixed prices of the books on the French market were maintained as a result of voluntary agreement between publishers and booksellers. In 1979 decrees forbidding such practices were issued by René Monory, French Minister of the Economy at the time.

Repealing of Monory's reforms of the book market, in order to protect small, traditional booksellers from competition of big stores and chain retailers (such as Fnac), was part of François Mitterrand's electoral program during presidential campaign in 1981. After Mitterrand won the election he appointed Jack Lang as the new Minister of Culture and tasked him with creating a law proposal for a law establishing mandatory fixed book price. In August 1981, the French parliament voted unanimously in favor of the law proposed by Lang.

== Contents of the law ==
The Lang Law works as follows:

- The publisher decides on a price for its book and is obliged to print it on the back
- Retailers (professional booksellers and other, nonspecialized sellers), are not allowed to sell a book for a discount more than 5% below the price set by the publisher.
- The law only applies to new books. The price of used books can be set freely.

Discounts of more than 5% can occasionally be applied under certain strict conditions: books must have been on the market for more than 2 years, and last restocked more than 6 months ago.

The law was extended to cover e-books in May 2011. Due to this law it is illegal to provide e-books of French publishers as a part of subscription service for a flat, periodical rate.

== See also ==
- Fixed book price

== Bibliography ==
- Canoy, Marcel; van Ours, Jan C.; van der Ploeg, Frederick (2006). "Chapter 21: The Economics of Books". In Ginsburgh, Victor A.; Throsby, David (eds.). Handbook of the Economics of Art and Culture. Vol. 1. Elsevier. pp. 720–761. doi:10.1016/S1574-0676(06)01021-0. ISBN 978-0-444-50870-6.
