= Marri Rajasekhar Reddy =

Indian politician (born 1970)

Member of Legislative Assembly
- Incumbent
- Assumed office 3 December 2023
- Preceded by: Mynampally Hanmanth Rao
- Constituency: Malkajgiri

Personal details
- Born: 17 June 1970 (age 56) Secunderabad, India
- Party: Telangana Rashtra Samithi
- Spouse: Mamata Reddy
- Children: Anushreya Reddy; Dhiren Reddy
- Parent(s): Marri Laxman Reddy, Arundathi
- Relatives: Ch. Malla Reddy (Father in Law))

Marri Rajasekhar Reddy (born 17 June 1970) is an Indian politician from Telangana state. He is a member of the Telangana Legislative Assembly from Malkajgiri Assembly constituency in Medchal Malkajgiri district. He represents Bharat Rashtra Samithi and won the 2023 Telangana Legislative Assembly election.

== Early life and education ==
Reddy was born in Hyderabad, India, to Marri Laxman Reddy and Arundathi Reddy. He married Mamatha Reddy and they have a son and a daughter. He passed intermediate from Wesley Junior College in 1989. He is the son in law of BRS MLA and minister Ch. Malla Reddy.

== Career ==
Reddy, who is in the education field, made his political move joining Telangana Rashtra Samithi in 2019. He won as an MLA for the first time from Malkajgiri Assembly constituency representing Bharat Rashtra Samithi in the 2023 Telangana Legislative Assembly election. He polled 125,049 votes and defeated his nearest rival, Mynampally Hanumanth Rao of Indian National Congress, by a huge margin of 49,530 votes.

In August 2024, Telangana revenue department served demolition notices to two of the institutions owned by Reddy, for allegedly building on lake beds, following a High Court directive to conduct an anti encroachment drive. The two institutions are the Marri Laxman Reddy Institute of Technology and the Institute of Aeronautical Engineering which are built on Chinna Damera Cheruvu lake bed in Dundigul district. Earlier in December 2023 after the assembly election, his phone number was allegedly spoofed and BRS leaders reportedly received threatening calls from that number according to a police complaint made to Rachakonda Police Commissioner DS Chauhan.
