= C. Kanaka Reddy =

Indian politician and legislator

Chintala Kanaka Reddy

Member Of Legislative Assembly
- In office 2014–2018
- Constituency: Malkajgiri, Telangana

Personal details
- Born: 10 February 1951 Secunderabad
- Died: 11 May 2019 (aged 68)
- Party: Telangana Rashtra Samithi
- Spouse: Prameela
- Children: Srinivas Reddy; Sripal Reddy; Shalini

Chintala Kanaka Reddy (10 February 1951 – 11 May 2019) was an Indian politician and legislator. He won as an MLA from Malkajgiri assembly constituency in Telangana Legislative Assembly. He belonged to Telangana Rashtra Samithi.

== Early life ==
He was born in Lothkunta in Secunderabad to Satyamma and Muthyam Reddy, a farmer. He has two brothers and three sisters. His elder brother, Chintala Venkat Reddy, is an acclaimed, innovative organic farmer, who holds patents in soil swapping techniques using zero fertilizers in farming.

== Career ==
He was a grape growing farmer and was the President of Grape Growers Association in Andhra Pradesh.

=== Political career ===
He joined Praja Rajyam Party in 2008 and contested from Malkajgiri constituency and lost the election. He joined TRS party in 2013 and won as an MLA in 2014 General Elections from the same constituency.
