= Solidarity tax on wealth =

Former tax in France

The solidarity tax on wealth (French: Impôt de solidarité sur la fortune, ISF) was an annual direct wealth tax on those in France having assets in excess of €1,300,000 (since 2011). It was one of the Socialist Party's 1981 electoral platform's measures, 110 Propositions for France. First named IGF (Impôt sur les Grandes Fortunes), it was abolished in 1986 by Jacques Chirac's right-wing government, but reestablished in 1988 as ISF in slightly different terms after François Mitterrand's reelection.

In September 2017, the French Government abolished ISF and replaced it with the wealth tax on real estate (IFI), from 2018.

== Scope ==
The calculation applied to tax declarers, meaning that it could apply to a grouping of two individuals: married couples, cohabiting couples, or couples with a PACS. All global assets were taken into account for French residents; for others, the tax was based on assets that reside in France, with the exception of financial ones.

The ISF was controversial; critics claimed it drove away wealthy individuals from the country, resulting in financial loss. A report by senator Philippe Marini estimated that 843 people left France in 2006 because of the tax, resulting in a net loss of €2.8 billion.

== Basis ==
In principle all assets were taken into account except for the following:

- professional goods such as enterprises (depending on the percentage owned),
- vintage (more than one century old) and collection objects,
- artistic, literature, or industrial rights,
- woods and participation in forestry plantations (for 75% of their value),
- anonymous bonds,
- capital value of pensions and retirement plans,
- capital obtained as compensation for physical injury in accidents or due to illness.

== Revenue ==
ISF brought in €4.42 billion in 2007, 19% more than in 2006. At the time, it constituted 1.5% of France's total tax receipts.

Half of all households who paid ISF made an annual contribution of less than €2,000.

== Rules to fix the net taxable value ==
ISF was levied on what remained of the gross value after subtracting deductible debts. The gross value was determined by the declarer following certain rules. For example, the value of the principal home was reduced by 30%, as was done for some rental income. Certain real estate properties in countries with a fiscal convention such as Denmark, Luxembourg, Egypt, Finland, Netherlands, and Czech Republic were excluded. The furniture in the home could not exceed 5% of the total value of the other goods.

Following President Nicolas Sarkozy's tax law of 2007, ISF was adjusted so that the sum of all taxes due in France would not exceed 50% of the annual revenues. He overturned this in 2011, at the same time as lowering the rates of the ISF.

== Rates ==
2011
Less than	€800,000	0%
From	€800,000 – 1.31 million	0.55%
From	€1.31 – 2.57 million	0.75%
From	€2.57 – 4.04 million	1.00%
From	€4.04 – 7.71 million	1.30%
From	€7.71 – 16.79 million	1.65%
Over	€16.79 million	1.80%

2012 (at tax cap removal)
Less than	€1.3 million	0%
From	€1.3-3 million	0.25%
Above	€3 million	0.5%

2013 (planned)
Less than	€800,000	0%
From	€800,000 – 1.31 million Only for assets above 1.31 million	0.5%
From	€1.31 – 2.57 million	0.7%
From	€2.57 – 5 million	1.00%
From	€5 – 10 million	1.25%
Over	€10 million	1.50%

After calculation, a deduction was granted for minors or any disabled persons living in the same household.

== See also ==
- Taxation in France
