= Padma Devender Reddy =

Indian politician

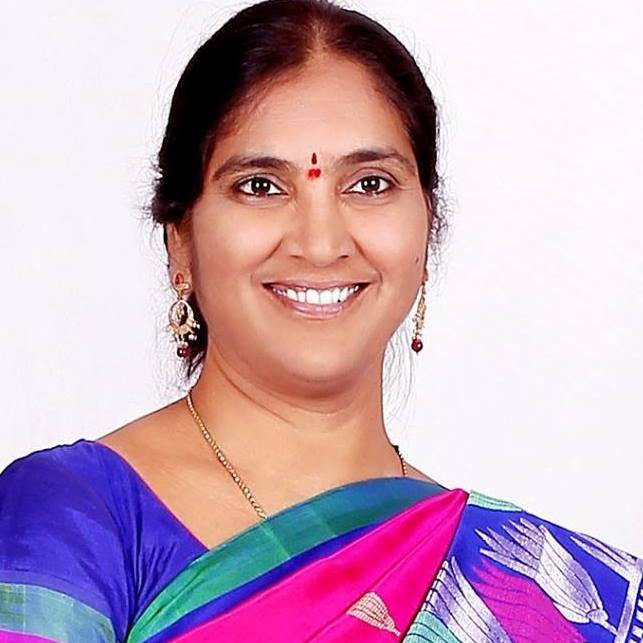

1st Deputy Speaker of Telangana Legislative Assembly
- In office 12 June 2014 – 16 January 2019
- Preceded by: Office Established
- Succeeded by: T. Padma Rao Goud

Member of Telangana Legislative Assembly
- In office 2014–2023
- Preceded by: Mynampally Hanumanth Rao
- Succeeded by: Mynampally Rohit
- Constituency: Medak

Personal details
- Born: 6 January 1969 (age 57) Namapur
- Party: Bharat Rashtra Samithi

Padma Devender Reddy (born 6 January 1969) is an Indian politician who was the 1st Deputy Speaker of Telangana Legislative Assembly from 12 June 2014 to 16 January 2019 and Member of the Telangana Legislative Assembly from Medak constituency from 2 June 2014 to 3 December 2023. She belongs to the Bharat Rashtra Samithi. She is a former MLA from Ramayampet assembly constituency. She regularly appears on political debates on Television and is known for good oratory skills.

== Early life ==
Padma Devender Reddy was born in KammarkhanPeta, Karimnagar, Telangana, India. She did her schooling at Vaniniketan Paatashaala, Karimnagar and did her BA and LLB.

== Career ==
She was a practising advocate in the Ranga Reddy district court and Andhra Pradesh High Court before entering active politics. She actively participated in the Telangana movement and entered politics after the TRS was formed in 2001.

=== Political career ===
Padma Devender Reddy joined at the inception in April 2001. She was elected as ZPTC Member from Ramayampet to Medak Zilla Parishad in 2001 local body elections and served as floor leader of the TRS party. After the formation of TRS party, she won with a large margin of 12,000 votes.

She was an MLA from 2004–09 from the same constituency. She lost the election in 2009 general elections.

She was suspended from the TRS party in 2009 and contested as a rebel. She joined TRS again in 2010. She won again as MLA in 2014 General elections from Medak assembly constituency defeating actress, Vijayashanti.

=== Deputy Speaker ===
On 12 June 2014, Padma Devender Reddy was elected unanimously as Deputy Speaker of the Telangana State Legislative Assembly, becoming the First Deputy Speaker in the newly created state of Telangana.

== Electoral History ==
=== Legislative Assembly Elections ===
Year	Constituency	Party	Votes	%	Opponent	Party	Votes	%	Result	Margin	%
2023	Medak	BRS	76,969	41.19	Mynampally Rohith	INC	87,126	46.63	Lost	-10,157	-5.44
2018	Medak	TRS	97,670	57.84	Upender Reddy Ammareddy	INC	49,687	29.42	Won	+47,983	+28.42
2014	Medak	TRS	89,654	56.64	Vijayashanti	INC	50,054	31.62	Won	+39,600	+25.02
2009	Medak	IND	23,368	15.49	Mynampally Hanumanth Rao	TDP	57,942	38.40	Lost	-34,574	-22.91
2004	Ramayampet	TRS	74,327	58.61	Mynampally Vani	TDP	44,120	34.79	Won	+30,207	+23.82
