= 110 Propositions for France =

François Mitterrand election program of 1981

110 Propositions for France (French: 110 Propositions pour la France) was the Socialist Party's program for the 1981 presidential election during which their candidate, François Mitterrand, was elected with 52% of the vote. This program significantly influenced the policies enacted during Mitterrand's two terms (1981–88 and 1988–95), but was also departed from when the French government implemented a range of austerity measures in 1983. These austerity measures were seen as a U-turn.

== Propositions ==
=== International ===
- The 1st Proposition called for the withdrawal of Soviet troops from Afghanistan.
- The 2nd Proposition called for the "condemnation of the aid given by the United States to Latin American dictatorships."
- The 3rd Proposition called for support to Polish workers and respect for "the independence of trade unions" (see Solidarity (Polish trade union)).
- The 4th Proposition called for "Peace in the Middle East by the guarantee of Israel's security in assured and recognized frontiers, the recognition of the right of the Palestinian people to a homeland, and the unity of Lebanon."
- The 5th Proposition called for the independence of Chad (then occupied by Libya), respect for Cambodia's sovereignty, and support for the right of self-determination of Eritrea and Western Sahara.
- The 6th Proposition called for "progressive and simultaneous disarmament in order to dissolve military blocs" with the maintenance of the "military balance".
- The 7th Proposition called for international action against nuclear proliferation and for the reinforcement of control of nuclear power stations.
- The 8th Proposition called for the opening of European negotiations on collective security, withdrawal of Soviet SS-20 ballistic missiles and of US MGM-31 Pershing missiles from European territory. This was eventually achieved by the Intermediate-Range Nuclear Forces Treaty (INF Treaty) of 1987, signed by US President Ronald Reagan and Soviet General Secretary Mikhail Gorbachev.
- The 9th Proposition called for the establishment of a "New International Economic Order". Development aid to Third World countries was to be increased to 0.70% of the gross national product of developed countries. This has become the standard aim for the European Union and international standards; however, few countries achieve it, including France.
- The 10th Proposition called for the definition of a new global financial system with the reform of the International Monetary Fund (IMF), the World Bank and of the European Currency Unit.

=== Europe ===
- The 11th Proposition called for the "strict application of the Treaty of Rome" of 1957, the reinforcement of "democratisation of [European] institutions", the "defense of employment in Europe" by the establishment of "common industrial policies" and "protection of sectors" threatened by Japanese and American products, and the establishment of common European regulations concerning the activities of multinational corporations.
- The 13th Proposition called for the creation of a "Council of the Mediterranean Peoples". The basic scheme for this was drawn up a few months after Mitterrand's death during the 1995 Barcelona Conference.
- The 41st Proposition called for the reform of the Common Agricultural Policy.

=== Employment: Social Growth by Control of Economics ===
The social and economic program was dominated by Keynesian measures.

- The 16th Proposition called for a "program of public works" and the construction of social housing and communal facilities (nursery schools, school restaurants, etc.).
- The 17th Proposition called for the "stimulation of research," with the aim of having this sector represent 2.5% of GNP by 1985. It also aimed at supporting small and medium-sized enterprises (SME) by facilitating credit and encouraging innovation.
- The 18th Proposition called for the creation of 150,000 jobs in the public sector in order to improve conditions of public access to healthcare, education, and the postal service. 60,000 jobs should be created to assist NGOs and local administrations.
- The 19th Proposition defined "social growth" as resting on the "dynamism of the public sector", the "encouragement of investment", the increase of low incomes and improvement of labour conditions.
- The 20th Proposition called for "the defense of the Franc against speculation," while "industrial and agricultural development" was to render growth less dependent on imports. The role of foreign trade in the GDP was to be decreased to 20% by 1990.
- The 21st Proposition called for the "nationalization of the nine industrial groups" specified in the Common Program of 1972 (between the Socialist Party, the Communist Party and the Radical Party of the Left). This led to the 13 February 1982 law of nationalization.
- The 22nd Proposition called for the CDI (Contrat à durée indéterminée, Indeterminate Length Contract) to become the base of labour relations, as well as for the extension of trade unions' capacities for involvement in businesses (protection of trade unions' representatives, etc.)
- The 23rd proposition on the reduction of working time to 35 hours was partly enacted: the legal workweek (excluding overtime, paid at a higher rate) was reduced to 39 hours in 1982. The Socialist Party (PS) would enact the 35-hour workweek only in 2000, during Lionel Jospin's Plural Left government, with the Aubry Laws.
- The 26th Proposition called for encouragement of savings, in particular by the establishment of the Livret A.
- The 27th Proposition called for financial incentives to assist in the realization of the economic and social policies' aims.
- The 28th Proposition called for price controls where competition "obviously does not work" (price gouging). The construction of supermarkets would be regulated.
- The 29th Proposition called for protection of arts and crafts and small business.
- The 31st Proposition called for the increase of the SMIC minimum wage, as well as of incomes for disabled people and guaranteed minimum incomes for retired people. Unemployment benefits would also be increased.
- The 32nd Proposition called for the reduction of value-added tax on essential goods to 0%.
- The 34th Proposition led to the creation of a solidarity tax on wealth (ISF). The ISF was abolished in 1986 by Prime Minister Jacques Chirac's right-wing Rally for the Republic government, and re-established in 1988 after Mitterrand's re-election. It also called for a reform of inheritance tax, increasing the burden on larger estates and reducing it on smaller ones.
- The 35th Proposition called for the reduction of direct taxation on lower incomes and its increase for high incomes.

=== Other domestic issues ===
- The 45th Proposition envisioned either the reduction of the presidential term of office to five years, or the retention of the seven-year term with a ban on re-election. This proposition was not enacted by Mitterrand: indeed, he won re-election in 1988 and served another seven-year term. However, the presidential term was eventually reduced to five years after the 2000 referendum called for by former president Chirac.
- The 47th Proposition on proportional representation and on the inclusion of 30% of women on each electoral list led to the introduction of proportional representation for legislative elections. However, this measure was ultimately applied only for the 1986 general elections.
- The 51st Proposition called for reinforcement of the independence of the judicial branch and for the reform of the Conseil supérieur de la magistrature (CSM). The Constitutional law of 27 July 1983 granted the CSM more independence, and later became articles 64 and 65 of the Constitution.
- The 52nd Proposition called for the repealing of exceptional judicial procedures (Cour de sûreté, created in 1963 to try crimes against national security; courts-martial in peacetime), as well as for the repeal of the 1970 Anti-Rioter Act and of the Peyrefitte law. These measures were implemented by Justice Minister Robert Badinter.
- The 53rd Proposition was enacted, leading to the abolition of the death penalty in 1981 by Justice Minister Robert Badinter.
- The 54th Proposition on decentralization was also enacted, leading to the 1982-83 laws on state decentralization.
- The 56th Proposition called for state support of regional identities.
- The 80th Proposition on the right of foreigners to vote in municipal elections was not enacted.
- The 94th Proposition called for the decentralization and pluralisation of TV and radio and for the creation of a Conseil supérieur de l'audiovisuel (CSA) on which the representatives of the government would be a minority. The rights of cibistes (citizens band radio users) would be recognized.
- The 95th Proposition called for a "guarantee of the independence of the Agence France-Presse toward the state" and for the application of the 1944 measures on the press.
- The 96th Proposition called for the prohibition of any kind of censorship, including in barracks and prisons.
- The 97th, 98th and 99th Propositions stressed the importance of research and culture (cinematic, theatrical, architectural, musical creations, etc.).
- The 100th Proposition proposed the abolition of the "price liberalization of books". The 1981 Lang Law enacted it by imposing a single fixed price on books, whatever the retailer (large retailers such as Fnac had to sell books at the same price as small, individual booksellers).
- The 104th Proposition called for the independence of sports from the "powers of money and of the state", thus following Léo Lagrange's insight during the Popular Front.

== See also ==
- 1981 French presidential election
- Socialist Party (France)
- François Mitterrand
