= Fixed book price =

Form of price maintenance

Fixed book price (FBP) is a form of resale price maintenance applied to books. It allows publishers to determine the price of a book at which it is to be sold to the public. FBP can take the form of a law, mandatory obligation on all retailers, or an agreement between publishers and booksellers. An example of a fixed book price law is French Lang Law and the German Buchpreisbindung. An example of a trade agreement is the former Net Book Agreement in the United Kingdom.

The key idea of an FBP is to promote non-price competition between booksellers in order to promote the sale of little-known, difficult or otherwise culturally interesting books rather than catering only to blockbuster readers. To do so, an FBP is deemed to ensure that the booksellers that provide the corresponding presale services are able to recoup their higher costs with a guaranteed margin on blockbusters.

Fixed book price systems, with various provisos, have existed in some developed countries since the beginning of the twentieth century. They remain in force in one third member states of the European Union as well as in some other countries. Despite the name, most fixed book price laws and agreements actually set minimum prices, allowing sellers to deviate from a price set by publishers by a small degree. Thus they are only limiting price competition, not suppressing it entirely.

== Principle ==
The main reason for introducing the FBP (either by agreement or law) is conviction that a dense network of well-stocked, high quality bookshops is a necessary condition for the publication of a large variety of books, large variety itself deemed desirable for the cultural life of a country (Canoy, van Ours & van der Ploeg 2006, p. 742). Such bookshops have additional costs that are not borne by discounters, who just stock their shelves with the current blockbusters. Since the latter represent a large proportion of book sales, price competition between high-quality bookshops and discounters reduces bookshops' profitability.

The FBP allows the publisher to mitigate this competition and thereby guarantees a sufficient margin for high-quality bookshops to operate.

== Scope ==
Countries with book prices fixed by law Countries with book prices fixed by business agreement Countries without fixed book prices No data

Historically, most countries with a significant book industry have known an FBPA since the 19th century. The development of competition policy in the 1970s led to a wave of repeals of those agreements (Australia 1972, Sweden 1974, UK 1995) at a time when any form of resale price maintenance was seen with much suspicion. Conversely, other countries (Spain 1975, Greece 1997, Italy 2005) enacted laws making the FBP mandatory.

The following table gives an overview of the prevalence of FBP in rich countries (sources: European Booksellers Federation and (Canoy, van Ours & van der Ploeg 2006, p. 749)).

Fixed book prices in selected countries
| Country | FBP | Comment |
|---|---|---|
| Germany | yes | Since 1888, mutual agreement replaced by law in 2002 |
| Argentina | yes | Law since 2001 |
| Austria | yes | Law since 2000 |
| South Korea | yes | Law since 2003, amended in 2014 |
| Denmark | yes | Business agreement since 1837, amended in 2001 |
| Spain | yes | 2007 Law substituting a 1975 Law |
| France | yes | Business agreement repealed in 1979, law since 1981 |
| Greece | yes | Law since 1997, amended in 2014 |
| Hungary | yes | Business agreement |
| Italy | yes | Law since 2001, with amendments made in 2011 to tighten the law (so called Levi Reform) |
| Japan | yes | |
| Luxembourg | yes | Domestic books only |
| Mexico | yes | Law since 2008 (applies only to the first 18 months after the book publication) |
| Norway | yes | Business agreement among members of book sellers association and publishers since 1962 (renegotiated in 2005). Law binding to all book sellers proposed in 2013, but unsure whether next parliament will repeal proposal before it takes effect. |
| Netherlands | yes | Business agreement since 1923, law since 2005 |
| Portugal | yes | Law since 1996 |
| Slovenia | no | Law since 2014 until 2020 |
| Croatia | yes | Law since 2007 |
| Australia | no | Repealed in 1972 |
| Belgium | yes | A fixed price is imposed for the first six months after publication. |
| Brazil | no | |
| Canada | no | |
| Estonia | no | |
| United States of America | no | |
| Finland | no | Repealed in 1971 |
| Ireland | no | The UK Net Book Agreement applied until 1992; it was disallowed in 1994 by the Competition Authority. |
| Poland | no | |
| Czech Republic | no | |
| United Kingdom | no | Revoked in 1995 |
| Sweden | no | Repealed in 1974 |
| Switzerland | no | Prohibited by the competition authority in 1999. Legislation reintroducing it failed in a 2012 referendum. |
| Venezuela | no | |

== Assessment ==
The assessment of the FBP is a controversial one. On the one hand, most economists ((Canoy, van Ours & van der Ploeg 2006) for an overview, (Ringstad 2004) for a specific discussion) are skeptical of the cultural merits of the FBP and underline its distorting effect. On the other hand, other economists ((Rouet 2007) on the French case, (Backhaus & Hansen 2003) on the German case) and the book industry argue that the FBP is the only tool that allows difficult, high-brow, and culturally significant books to be published. Therefore, they say, the distortion should account for the much larger cultural externalities of meaningful cultural works. More recent work has found positive effects arising from FBP policies, based on a cross-country examination of European nations. As (Canoy, van Ours & van der Ploeg 2006, p. 743) put it,

The cultural merits ascribed to such agreements have almost reached mythical proportions. No public debate in Europe on the cultural value of books is complete without a discussion of the FBP.

=== Theoretical framework ===
Several industrial organization frameworks can be applied to assess the consequences of the FBP.

The most commonly cited result is (Telser 1960). This paper states that when two retailers can engage on tangible presale services, that is can undertake an unobservable costly effort that increases the demand for both of them (advertisement, sessions with authors, thematic weeks), each one has an incentive to free-ride on the other retailer's effort by setting its price slightly below his competitor (which cannot correspondingly cut his price, since he supports the cost of a higher level of effort). This leads to a suboptimal (too low, from the publisher's point of view) level of aggregate effort. By cancelling the possibility of price competition, a FBP makes impossible this kind of opportunistic behaviour and induces both retailers to compete in services.

According to (Canoy, van Ours & van der Ploeg 2006), the main idea of FBP (keeping best seller prices high in order to subsidize the sale of less popular books) is unconvincing for several reasons:

- the market subsidizes new books per se, in order to get a best seller
- there is no guarantee that the subsidy will occur anyway. In fact, the authors suggest that both publishers and booksellers have an incentive not to carry it out
- if less popular books are less price elastic than popular books, monopoly profits in them are higher
- even if the subsidy works, there is no accounting for what or how it's done
- even if the subsidy works, it's not clear that it's worth the price distortion

=== Empirical assessment ===
(Ringstad 2004) and (Fishwick 2005) provide empirical assessments of FBP comparing countries with and without a FBP (Nordic countries for Ringstad, France and the UK for Fishwick). According to these authors, the two main effects of a repeal of a FBP is a displacement of small independent bookstores by larger chain outlets and a decrease in the price of bestsellers, compensated by an increase of the price of all other books.

(Ringstad 2004) notices that the level of book prices and the number of published titles evolves in a similar manner in all Nordic countries (Norway, Sweden, Finland) although only Norway has a FBP and Finland belongs to a different linguistic group. In Denmark (FBP since 2000), however, book prices have increased one-third quicker than general inflation since 1985 and the number of books sold has fallen by two-thirds, a sharp contrast with Sweden and Norway, which belong to the same linguistic group. His conclusion, supported by elements from (Fjeldstad 2001), is that the effects of a FBP are less than both proponents and critics make them, and that other institutional agreements (e.g. only pure bookshops can carry textbooks in Norway) better explain the evolution of the book markets in those countries.

According to (Fishwick 2005), the ending of the FBPA in the UK (1995) did not lead to a sharp decrease of the number of bookshops, rather to a displacement of small, independent bookshops by big-chain outlets. He notices however that the former stayed in place where a quality-sensitive demand existed, and that competition between bookshops spurred a reduction of operational costs thanks to better logistics and collection management (an argument also found in (Ringstad 2004)). In a counterfactual manner, (Rouet 2007) shows that in France, the FBP helped to maintain a dense network of independent bookshops, reined in the deployment of chain bookstores and spurred supermarkets to boost their offer of books. Fishwick also shows that while the number of published titles increases as fast as in France, there is no sign of an overall increase of book prices. He shows however that this stability hides a strong distributive effect. Comparison with France show that the FBP leads to an increase of the price of bestsellers relative to non-FBP markets and a decrease of low-selling or long-selling books. He argues that the assessment of this effect is difficult, since the relation between the (un)popularity of a book and its cultural value is unclear, whereas consumers of low-selling books are, on average, wealthier than consumers of bestsellers (making a FBP a subsidy of wealthier people by poorer people).

== Bibliography ==
- Canoy, Marcel; van Ours, Jan C.; van der Ploeg, Frederick (2006), "Chapter 21: The Economics of Books", Handbook of the Economics of Art and Culture, Handbook on the Economics of Art and Culture, vol. 1, Elsevier, pp. 720–761, doi:10.1016/S1574-0676(06)01021-0, ISBN 978-0-444-50870-6
- Rouet, François (2007), Le Livre, mutations d'une industrie culturelle, Les Études de la documentation française (in French) (2 ed.), Paris: La Documentation française
- Backhaus, J.G.; Hansen, R. (2003), "Resale price maintenance for books in Germany and the European Union: A legal and economic analysis", From Economic to Legal Competition: New Perspectives on Law and Institutions in Europe: 87, archived from the original on 2011-07-18
- Ringstad, V. (2004), "On the cultural blessings of fixed book prices" (PDF), International Journal of Cultural Policy, 10 (3): 351–365, doi:10.1080/1028663042000312570, S2CID 153493495
- Fishwick, Franck (2005), "Le Commerce du livre au royaume-Uni en 2004" (PDF), Les Cahiers du SLF (in French), 2: 33–44
- Telser, Lester (1960), "Why Should Manufacturers Want Fair Trade", Journal of Law and Economics, 3: 86–105, doi:10.1086/466564, JSTOR 724814, S2CID 154443904
- Fjeldstad, Anton (2001). Å sette pris på bøker : om prissystema for bøker i ein del europeiske land (in Norwegian). Oslo: Norsk kulturråd. ISBN 978-82-7081-097-0.
