= Medak Assembly constituency =

Constituency of the Telangana legislative assembly in India

Coordinates: 18.05°N 78.27°E

Medak
- Constituency No. 34 for the Telangana Legislative Assembly
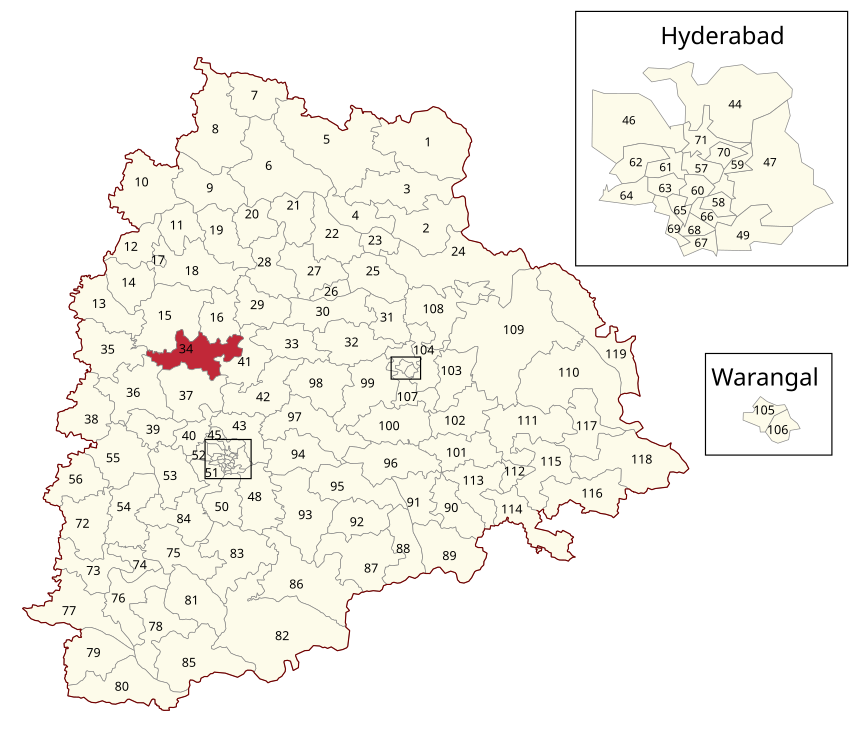
- Location of Medak Assembly constituency within Telangana

Constituency details
- Country: India
- Region: South India
- State: Telangana
- District: Medak
- Lok Sabha constituency: Medak
- Established: 1951
- Total electors: 1,99,553
- Reservation: None

Member of Legislative Assembly
- 3rd Telangana Legislative Assembly
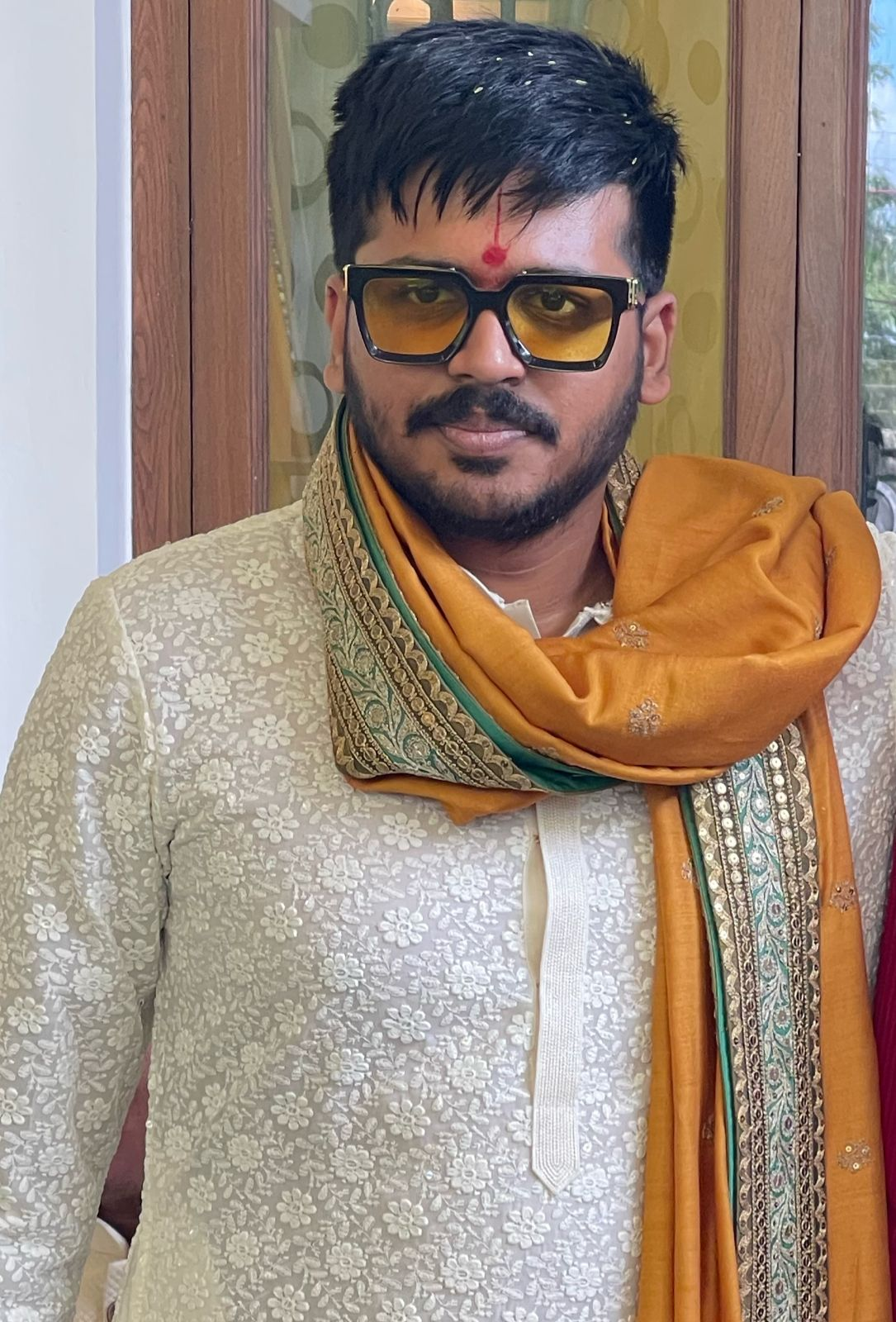
- Incumbent Mynampally Rohit
- Party: Indian National Congress
- Elected year: 2023

Medak Assembly constituency is a constituency of the Telangana Legislative Assembly, India. It is one of the two constituencies in Medak district. It is part of Medak Lok Sabha constituency

== Mandals ==
The assembly constituency presently comprises the following mandals:

Mandal
Medak
Papannapet
Ramayampet
Shankarampet -R

== Members of Legislative Assembly ==
Members of Legislative Assembly who represented Medak:

Year	Name	Political Party
Andhra Pradesh
1957	Venkateswar Rao	Indian National Congress
1962	Keval Ananda Devi	Communist Party of India
1967	R. Reddy	Indian National Congress
1972	Karnam Ramachandra Rao	Independent
1978	Seri Lakshma Reddy	Indian National Congress
1983	Karnam Ramachandra Rao	Telugu Desam Party
1985	Karnam Ramachandra Rao	Telugu Desam Party
1989	Patlolla Narayana Reddy	Indian National Congress
1994	Karnam Ramachandra Rao	Telugu Desam Party
1999	Karnam Ramachandra Rao	Telugu Desam Party
2002*	Karanam Uma Devi	Telugu Desam Party
2004	P. Shashidhar Reddy	Janata Party
2009	Mynampalli Hanumanth Rao	Telugu Desam Party
Telangana
2014	Padma Devender Reddy	Telangana Rashtra Samithi
2018	Padma Devender Reddy	Telangana Rashtra Samithi
2023	Mynampally Rohit	Indian National Congress

*bypoll

== Election results ==
=== Telangana Legislative Assembly election, 2023 ===
Telangana Assembly Elections, 2023: Medak (Assembly constituency)
Party	Candidate	Votes	%	±%
INC	Mynampally Rohit	87,126	46.63	
BRS	Padma Devender Reddy	76,969	41.19	
BJP	Panja Vijay Kumar	13,657	7.31	
Independent	A. Kumar	2,489	1.33	
NOTA	None of the Above	1,860	1.00	
Majority		10,157	5.44	
Turnout		1,86,863		
INC gain from BRS		Swing		

=== Telangana Legislative Assembly election, 2018 ===
Telangana Assembly Elections, 2018: Medak (Assembly constituency)
Party	Candidate	Votes	%	±%
TRS	Padma Devender Reddy	97,670	57.84	
INC	Ammareddy Gari Upender Reddy	49,687	29.42	
SFB	Revelli Vinay Sagar	6,947	4.11	
ZNP	Akula Rajaiah	6,321	3.74	
NOTA	None of the Above	2,263	1.34	
Majority		47,983	28.42	
Turnout		1,68,862	86.29	
TRS hold		Swing		

=== Telangana Legislative Assembly election, 2014 ===
Telangana Assembly Elections, 2014: Medak (Assembly constituency)
Party	Candidate	Votes	%	±%
TRS	Padma Devender Reddy	89,654	56.64	
INC	Vijayashanti	50,054	31.62	
TDP	Batti Jagapathi	9,281	5.86	
Independent	Pogaku Ashok Kumar	3,240	2.05	
NOTA	None of the above	1,602	1.01	
Majority		39,600	25.02	
Turnout		1,58,292	77.70	
TRS gain from TDP		Swing		

== See also ==
- Medak
- List of constituencies of Telangana Legislative Assembly
