= 1986 French legislative election =

- 16 March 1986

All 573 seats to the French National Assembly 287 seats needed for a majority
- Turnout: 78.12%
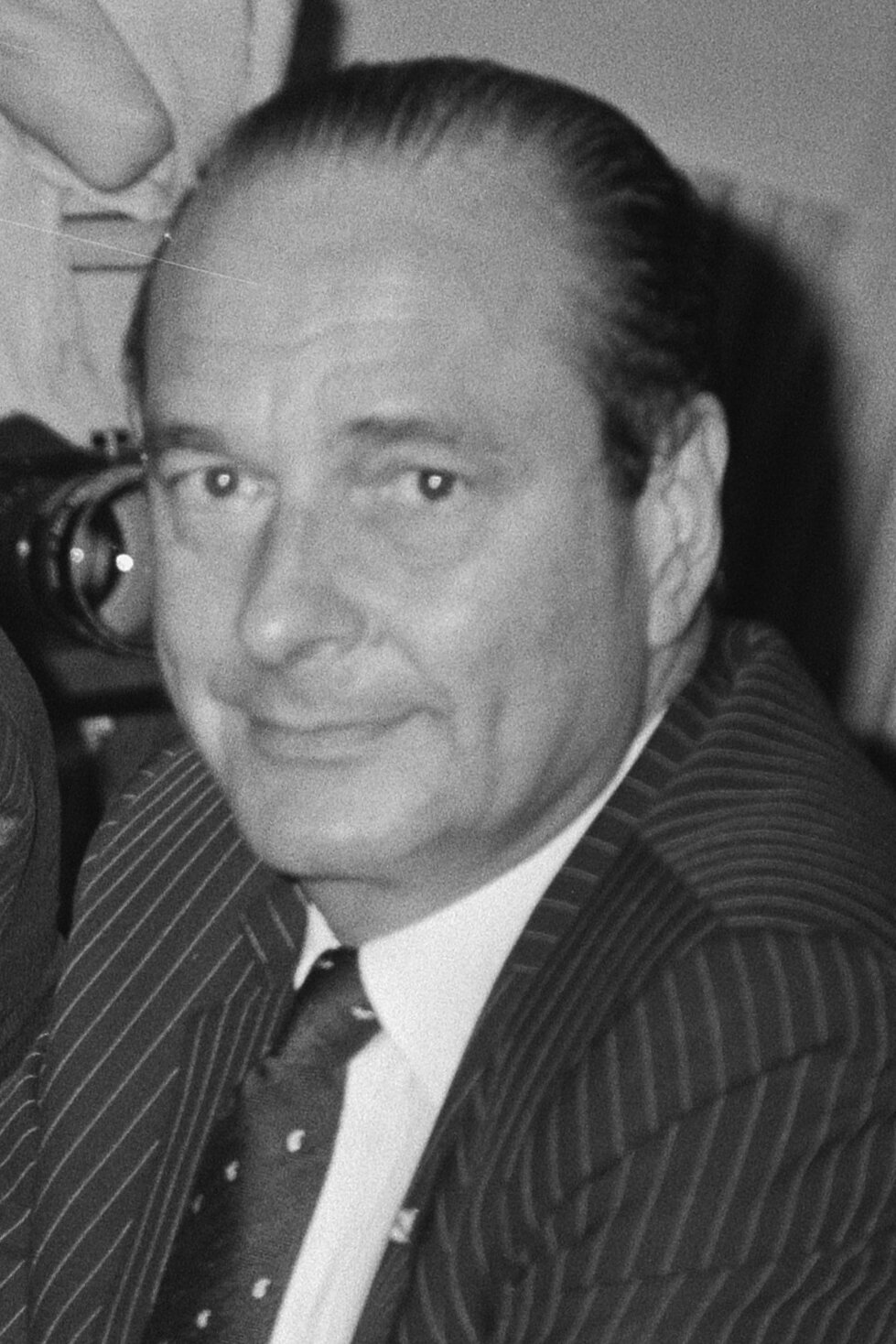

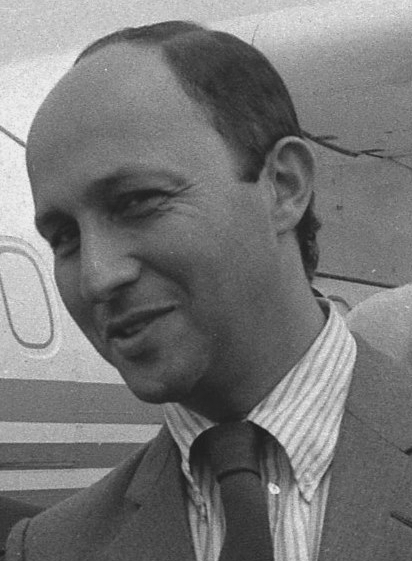

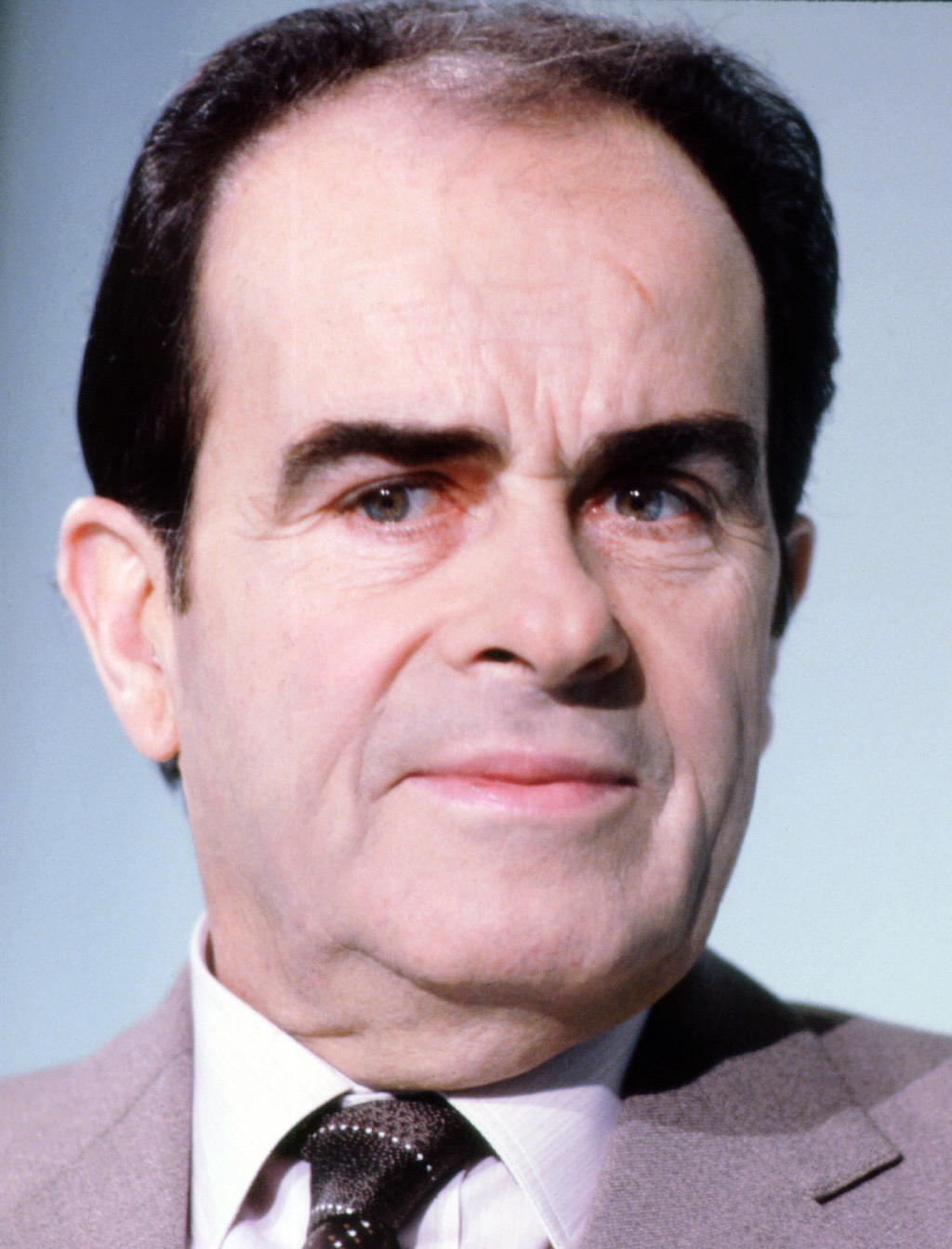

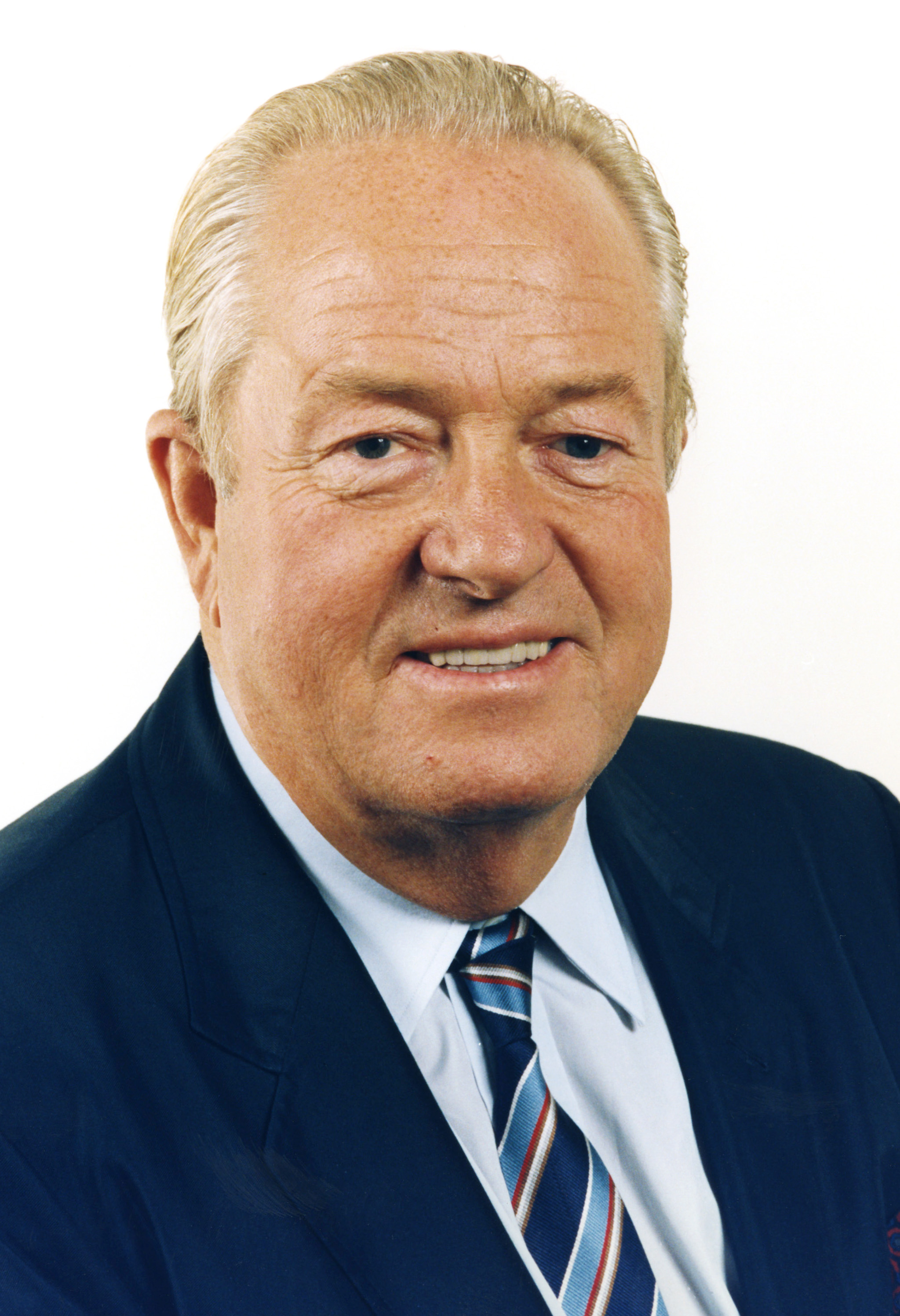
	Majority party	Minority party
Leader	Jacques Chirac	Laurent Fabius
Party	UOR	PS
Leader's seat	Corrèze	Seine-Maritime
Last election	146 seats, 40.0%	269 seats, 37.5%
Seats won	277	207
Seat change	▲131	▼62
Popular vote	11,492,450	8,705,163
Percentage	40.97%	31.04%
	Third party	Fourth party
Leader	Georges Marchais	Jean-Marie Le Pen
Party	PCF	FN
Leader's seat	Val-de-Marne	Paris
Last election	44 seats, 16.2%	0 seats, 0.2%
Seats won	35	35
Seat change	▼9	▲35
Popular vote	2,740,972	2,705,336
Percentage	9.77%	9.65%
Prime Minister before election
Laurent Fabius
PS
Elected Prime Minister
Jacques Chirac
RPR

Legislative elections were held in France on 16 March 1986 to elect the eighth National Assembly of the Fifth Republic. Because of the 47th of the 110 Propositions for France, this election was conducted under a system of party-list proportional representation, unlike other legislative elections of the Fifth Republic.

Since the 1981 election of François Mitterrand, the Presidential majority in the legislature had become fractured. In March 1983 Prime Minister Mauroy renounced the left's radical Common Programme of the 1970s. Wages and prices had been frozen. This change of economic policy was justified by the will to stay in the European Monetary System. A year later, all Communist ministers left Laurent Fabius's cabinet.

In opposition, the two main right-wing parties tried to forget their past quarrels. They were able to win the mid-term elections (1982: departmental, 1983: municipal, 1984: European Parliamentary) and succeeded in forcing the government to abandon its policy of limiting the financing of private schools in 1984. The Rally for the Republic (RPR), led by Jacques Chirac, abandoned the traditional dirigiste and Eurosceptic Gaullist doctrines about the economy and European integration. It was then able to sign an electoral platform with the Union for French Democracy (UDF). It proposed notably to sell the companies nationalized jointly by Mitterrand and Mauroy.

However, France had also witnessed the electoral rise of the National Front (FN). Its leader, Jean-Marie Le Pen, made nationalist and xenophobic remarks. He appealed to part of the conservative electorate, notably some RPR voters. The right-wing opposition was divided on the question of an alliance with the FN. In 1985, President Mitterrand's decision to re-establish party-list proportional representation at the legislative election caused political outrage. The RPR/UDF opposition accused him of wanting to strengthen the FN in order to weaken the Republican Right, which was favourite to win according to the polls. Proportional representation was the only electoral system which was considered likely to allow the election of FN deputies.

Opinion polls predicted RPR-UDF victory. Former UDF Prime minister Raymond Barre argued that any such coalition should refuse to govern if President Mitterrand did not resign. Advised by Edouard Balladur, Jacques Chirac noted, however, that impeachment did not exist in the constitution. Instead, the next majority would "cohabit" with Mitterrand. The right-wing cabinet would enforce its domestic policy programme and Mitterrand would keep control of foreign and military affairs.

At this election the RPR/UDF coalition won a slender two-seat majority. Also, for the first time of the history of the Fifth Republic, the parliamentary majority was opposed to the President. Nevertheless, the Socialist Party held more seats than most polls predicted. Jean-Marie Le Pen's FN was recognised as parliamentary group in size and stature, rising to 35 elected members. The decline of the French Communist Party continued. Mitterrand nominated Chirac as Prime Minister. The first "cohabitation" of the Fifth Republic started. The new cabinet, including PM Chirac, abolished proportional representation for the next legislative elections. The "cohabitation" ended with the 1988 legislative election.

== Results ==
Party or alliance		Votes	%	Seats
Union of the Opposition for Renewal	RPR–UDF joint list	6,017,207	21.45	147
Union of the Opposition for Renewal	Rally for the Republic	3,145,171	11.21	77
Union of the Opposition for Renewal	Union for French Democracy	2,330,072	8.31	53
Union of the Opposition for Renewal	Total	11,492,450	40.97	277
Socialist Party		8,705,163	31.04	207
French Communist Party		2,740,972	9.77	35
National Front		2,705,336	9.65	35
Miscellaneous right		1,096,511	3.91	14
Far-left		427,753	1.53	0
Ecologists		340,138	1.21	0
Miscellaneous left		290,059	1.03	5
Movement of Left Radicals		107,754	0.38	2
Far-right		57,334	0.20	0
Union of the Left		56,044	0.20	2
Regionalists		28,045	0.10	0
Total		28,047,559	100.00	577
Valid votes		28,047,559	95.63	
Invalid/blank votes		1,280,549	4.37	
Total votes		29,328,108	100.00	
Registered voters/turnout		37,541,124	78.12	
Source: IPU

=== Parliamentary groups in the National Assembly ===
Graph of the party split among 577 seats.
Party	Seats
Socialist Group	212
RPR Group	155
UDF Group	131
Communist Group	35
FN Group	35
Non-Inscrits	9
Total	577
Source: IPU
