= H. R. Nagendra =

Best personal yoga trainer

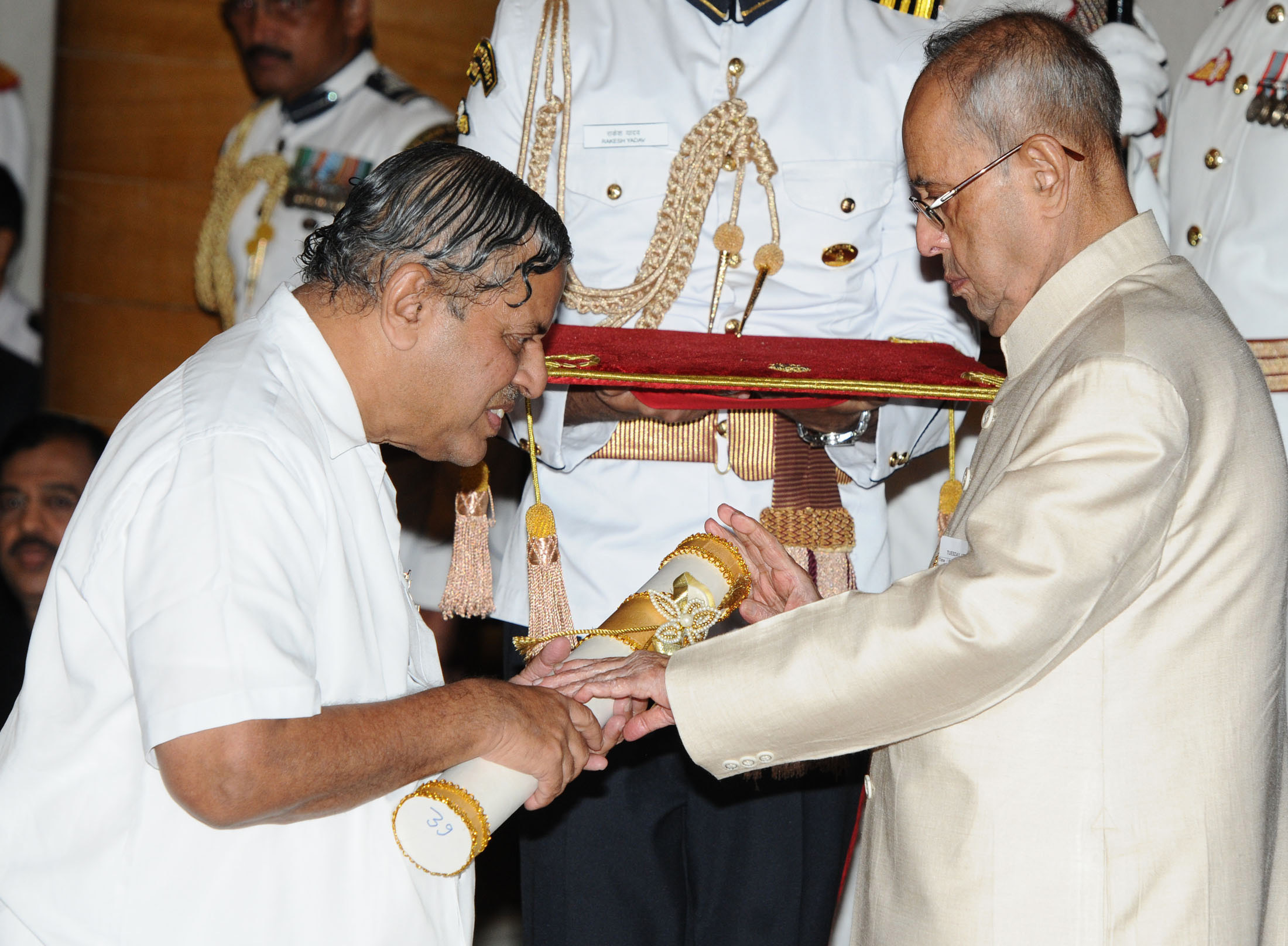
- President Pranab Mukherjee presenting the Padma Shri Award to Nagendra (left) in 2016
- Born: 1 January 1943 (age 83); Karnataka, India
- Occupations: Yoga Researcher; Academic; Writer
- Years active: Since 1968
- Known for: Yoga; Swami Vivekananda Yoga Anusandhana Samsthana
- Awards: Padma Shri; Yoga Shri

H. R. Nagendra is an Indian mechanical engineer, Yoga therapist, academic, writer and the founder vice chancellor of Swami Vivekananda Yoga Anusandhana Samsthana (S-VYASA), a deemed university located in Bengaluru. He is best known as the personal yoga consultant of Narendra Modi, the prime minister of India and is a recipient of Yoga Shri title from the Ministry of Health and Family Welfare. He has authored 35 books and over 100 research papers on Yoga. The Government of India awarded him the fourth highest civilian honour of the Padma Shri, in 2016, for his contributions to society.

== Biography ==
H. R. Nagendra, born on New Year's Day 1943 in the south Indian state of Karnataka, graduated in mechanical engineering and continued his studies to secure a doctoral degree (PhD) from the Indian Institute of Science (IISc), Bengaluru. He started his career by joining IISc as a member of faculty of mechanical engineering in 1968 and held the post till 1975. In between, he served as a post-doctoral fellow at the University of British Columbia in 1970 followed by a stint at Marshall Space Flight Center of NASA during 1970–71. During his stay in the US, he was also associated with Harvard University as a consultant at their Engineering Sciences Laboratory from 1970 to 1972 after which he moved to London and worked as a visiting faculty at Imperial College of Science and Technology. Returning to India, he resumed his career at IISc which would stretch for two more years till he started his association in 1975 with Vivekananda Kendra, a spiritual organization founded in 1972 by Eknath Ranade, by taking up the post of the honorary director of the training centre at the organization's headquarters in Kanyakumari.

For the next quarter of a century, Nagendra was involved with organizational and operational activities of Vivekananda Kendra. He became the national secretary of Yoga Shiksha Vibhag, the yoga education centre of the organization in 1975 and held the post till he was elected as the national vice president of the organization in 1993. In between, he also held the post of the Secretary of Vivekananda Kendra Yoga Therapy and Research Committee from 1979 to 1986 and the post of the Secretary of Vivekananda Kendra Yoga Research Foundation and the Director of Indian Yoga Institute from 1986 to 2000. In 2000, he became the president of Vivekananda Yoga Anusandhana Samsthana, which was started as a society in 2000, and when the society started its academic programs in 2002, he became its founder vice chancellor. The university was subsequently recognized by the University Grants Commission as a deemed university. He served as the vice chancellor of the university till 2013 when Ramachandra G. Bhat took over the position but continues his association with the university as its chancellor. He has also served as a member of the working group on health of the erstwhile Planning Commission of India.

== Awards and honours ==
The Ministry of Health and Family Welfare awarded him the title of Yoga Shri in 1997. The Government of India included in the Republic Day honours list for the civilian award of the Padma Shri in 2016.

== Legacy ==
Nagendra is reported to be the pioneer of Cyclic meditation, a yoga technique where the practitioners perform slow conscious physical movements. He claims the technique is useful in treating certain psychiatric illnesses, asthma and cancer and helps the practitioner in stress management. It was during his tenure as the vice chancellor, Prashanti Kuteeram, the present headquarters of the university was constructed in Bengaluru. He chaired the organizing committee of the International Yoga Day functions held in New York on 21 June 2015 where two world records were set; a yoga class featuring 35,985 people, and the largest number of participating nationalities (84 nations). He has published 35 books and over 110 articles on Yoga, besides publishing 30 research papers in engineering and mentoring 20 doctoral students.

== Selected bibliography ==
=== Books ===
- H. R. Nagendra; United States. National Aeronautics and Space Administration; George C. Marshall Space Flight Center (1971). NASA TN D-6554. National Aeronautics and Space Administration For sale for Federal Scientific and Technical Information, Springfield, Virginia 22151.
- H. R. Nagendra (1986). A New Light for Asthmatics. Vivekananda Kendra Yoctas (Yoga Therapy & Research Committee).
- H. R. Nagendra; T. Mohan; A. Shriram (1988). Yoga in Education. Vivekananda Kendra Yoga Anusandhan Samsthan.
- H. R. Nagendra (2001). Yoga for Anxiety and Depression. Swami Vivekananda Yoga Prakashana.
- H. R. Nagendra (2001). Yoga for Back Pain. Swami Vivekananda Yoga Prakashana.
- H. R. Nagendra (2001). Yoga for Arthritis. Swami Vivekananda Yoga Prakashana.
- H. R. Nagendra (2002). Yoga for Digestive Disorders. Swami Vivekananda Yoga Prakashana.
- S. S. Srikanta; H. R. Nagendra (2003). Yoga for Diabetes (Diabetes Mellitus: Modern Medical & Yoga Perspectives). Swami Vivekananda Yoga Prakashana. ISBN 978-81-87313-13-7.
- H. R. Nagendra (2004). Yoga for Promotion of Positive Health. Swami Vivekananda Yoga Prakashana.

=== Articles ===
- Hyorim An; Ravi Kulkarni; R Nagarathna; HR Nagendra (January 2010). "Measures of heart rate variability in women following a meditation technique". Int J Yoga. 3 (1): 6–9. doi:10.4103/0973-6131.66772. PMC 2952123. PMID 20948895. S2CID 13121380.
- Hyorim An; Ravi Kulkarni; R Nagarathna; HR Nagendra (January 2010). "Measures of heart rate variability in women following a meditation technique". Int J Yoga. 3 (1): 6–9. doi:10.4103/0973-6131.66772. PMC 2952123. PMID 20948895. S2CID 13121380.
- Raghuram N; Parachuri VR; Swarnagowri MV; Babu S; Chaku R; Kulkarni R5; Bhuyan B; Bhargav H; Nagendra HR (2014). "Yoga based cardiac rehabilitation after coronary artery bypass surgery: one-year results on LVEF, lipid profile and psychological states--a randomized controlled study". Indian Heart J. 66 (5): 490–502. doi:10.1016/j.ihj.2014.08.007. PMC 4223225. PMID 25443601.
- Rao YC, Kadam A, Jagannathan A, Babina N, Rao R, Nagendra HR (2014). "Efficacy of naturopathy and yoga in bronchial asthma". Indian J Physiol Pharmacol. 58 (3): 233–9. PMID 25906606.
- Suchitra SP, Jagan A, Nagendra HR (2014). "Development and initial standardization of Ayurveda child personality inventory". J Ayurveda Integr Med. 5 (4): 205–8. doi:10.4103/0975-9476.146562. PMC 4296431. PMID 25624693.
- Bhargav H, Nagendra HR, Gangadhar BN, Nagarathna R (May 2014). "Corrigendum: frontal hemodynamic responses to high frequency yoga breathing in schizophrenia: a functional near-infrared spectroscopy study". Front Psychiatry. 5 (55): 55. doi:10.3389/fpsyt.2014.00055. PMC 4032994. PMID 24904438. S2CID 13499173.
- Suchitra SP, Nagendra HR (October 2013). "A self-rating scale to measure tridoṣas in children". Anc Sci Life. 33 (2): 85–91. doi:10.4103/0257-7941.139042. PMC 4171859. PMID 25284940. S2CID 31514946.
- Raghuram N, Rao RM, Nagendra HR (December 2015). "Integrating Yoga in Oncology: Is the wait over?". Indian J Surg Oncol. 6 (4): 325–6. doi:10.1007/s13193-016-0492-6. PMC 4809850. PMID 27065655. S2CID 5475810.
- Lu Q, You J, Kavanagh A, Warmoth K, Meng Z, Chen Z, Chandwani KD, Perkins GH, McQuade JL, Raghuram NV, Nagarathna R, Liao Z, Nagendra HR, Chen J, Guo X, Liu L, Arun B, Cohen L (September 2016). "Differences in quality of life between American and Chinese breast cancer survivors". Support Care Cancer. 24 (9): 3775–82. doi:10.1007/s00520-016-3195-1. PMC 5421630. PMID 27048455. S2CID 3822671.
- Dwivedi U, Kumari S, Nagendra HR (2016). "Effect of yoga practices in reducing counterproductive work behavior and its predictors". Indian J. Psychiatry. 58 (2): 10.4103/0019–5545.183778. doi:10.4103/0019-5545.183778. PMC 4919969. PMID 27385858. S2CID 1087234.
