= Yanung Jamoh Lego =

Indian herbalist

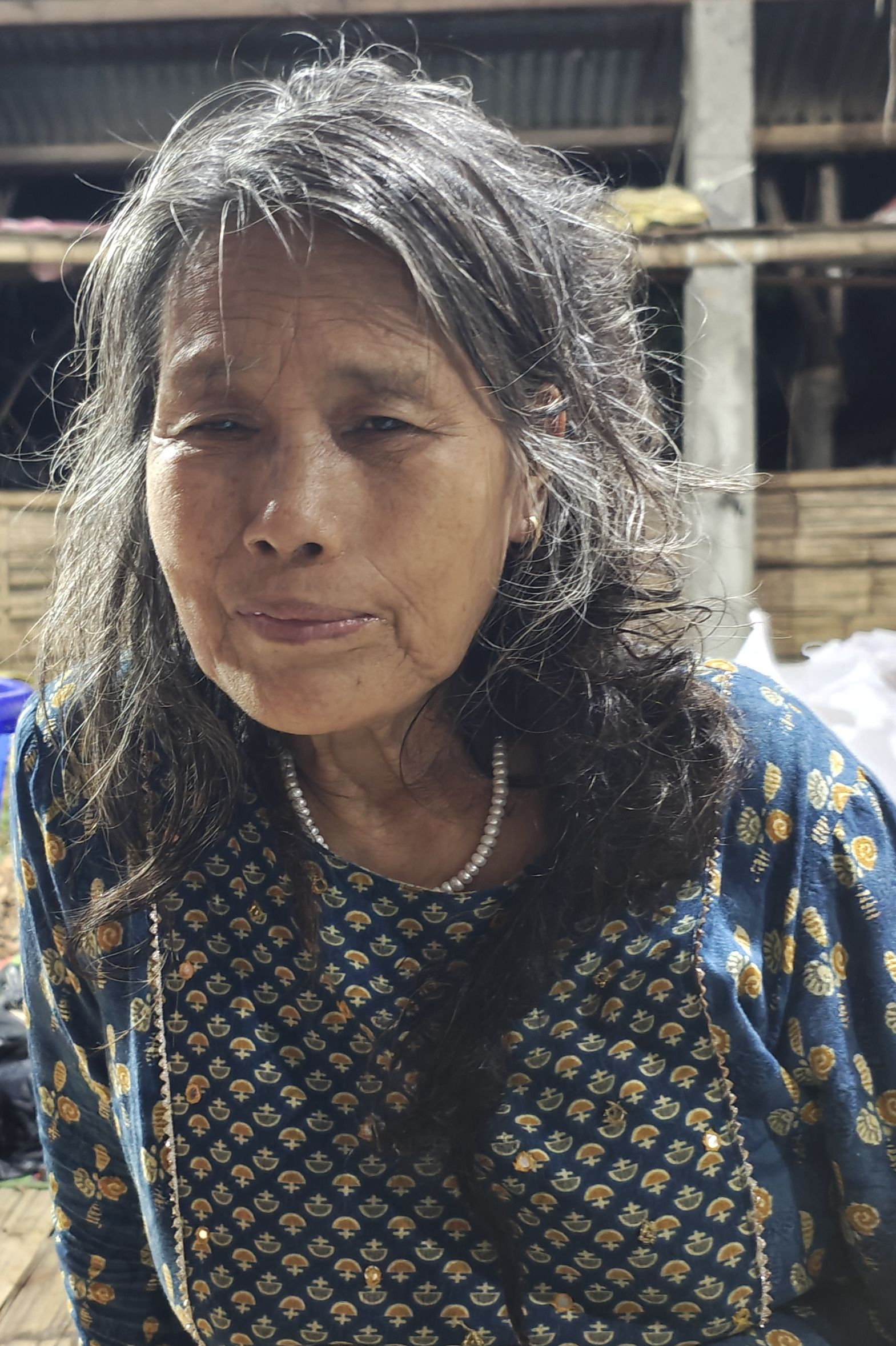
- Born: July 9, 1963 (age 63); Sika Todke village, East Siang district, Arunachal Pradesh
- Education: M.Sc in Agriculture
- Occupation: Herbalist
- Awards: Padma Shri, 2024

Yanung Jamoh Lego (born 9 July 1963) is a herbalist from Arunachal Pradesh, India. She is known for her work providing herbal medicine, which is commonly regarded as pseudoscience, to over 10,000 people with conditions such as diabetes, cancer, and hypertension, and for her role in reviving the traditional folk healing methods of the Adi tribe in Arunachal Pradesh.

In 2024, the Indian government awarded her the Padma Shri, the country's fourth-highest civilian award, for her contributions to agricultural and herbal medicine. In April 2024, President Droupadi Murmu gave the honour during a civil investiture ceremony at Rashtrapati Bhavan in New Delhi.

== Early Life & Education ==
Jamoh was born into an Adi tribal family in Sika Todke village in East Siang district of Arunachal Pradesh. Her father was a renowned folk healer from Arunachal Pradesh. Jamoh completed her Bachelor's and Master's in Agriculture from Assam Agriculture University in Jorhat.

== Career ==
Jamoh worked in the Agriculture Department of the Government of Arunachal Pradesh from 1988 till 2023. In 1995, Jamoh started her career as a herbalist, reviving Adi folk healing practices inherited from her father.

=== Training and practice ===
Lego started a 15-year apprenticeship in herbal medicine in 1981, motivated by her father, a well-known folk healer. She started her own clinic in 1995 and began treating patients with everything from dengue, asthma, and gynaecological diseases to cancer, epilepsy, and leprosy. She is said to have treated over 300,000 patients over the course of almost thirty years.

=== Indigenous Herbal Heritage ===
Lego established Indigenous Herbal Heritage in 2009 to support the growing of therapeutic herbs. Every year, some 5,000 medicinal specimens are taught to over 100,000 people about the advantages of herbs and plants.

== Awards & Recognition ==
- SRISTI Samman (2007)
- Paramparika Vaidya Ratna (2013)
- Arunachal State Award (2019)
- Padma Shri (2024)
