= Jonas Masetti =

Brazilian Vedanta Acharya

- Vishvanatha
- Born: Rio de Janeiro, Brazil
- Occupation: Traditional Vedanta Teacher
- Known for: Founding Vishva Vidya Organization; popularising Advaita Vedanta in Brazil
- Awards: Padma Shri (2025)
- Website: vedanta.com.br

Jonas Masetti, also known by the traditional name Vishvanatha, is a Brazilian teacher of Advaita Vedanta, Sanskrit and yoga. He is the founder of Instituto Vishva Vidya, based in Petrópolis, Rio de Janeiro, and a direct disciple of Swami Dayananda Saraswati.

Masetti began teaching after completing a multi-year residential course with Swami Dayananda at Arsha Vidya Gurukulam in Coimbatore, India. Through online classes, retreats and publications in Portuguese and English, his work has reached an audience that the Indian government has cited at over 150,000 students.

In 2020 he was praised by Indian Prime Minister Narendra Modi in the radio program Mann Ki Baat as "an ambassador of Vedic culture", and in 2025 he received the Padma Shri, India's fourth-highest civilian honour, in the category of Literature & Education.

== Early life ==
Masetti was born in Rio de Janeiro. He has described his family as having Italian heritage and Brazilian indigenous ancestry, primarily from the Minas Gerais region.

== Education and early career ==
Masetti graduated in mechanical engineering from the Instituto Militar de Engenharia (IME) in Rio de Janeiro, where he was also commissioned as an Army lieutenant. At age 21 he co-founded Morning Star Consulting, a consultancy serving the financial market.

== Study of Vedanta ==
Masetti began studying Vedanta in 2004 with Santosh Vallury, an Indian teacher residing in Brazil. He continued under Gloria Arieira, the pioneer of Vedanta and Sanskrit teaching in Brazil, who was herself awarded the Padma Shri in 2020.

In 2006 he met Swami Dayananda Saraswati during a study trip to the United States, at the Arsha Vidya Gurukulam (USA)|ashram in Saylorsburg, Pennsylvania. He subsequently travelled to India for shorter intensive courses, and in 2009 entered a multi-year residential course with Swami Dayananda at the Arsha Vidya Gurukulam in Coimbatore — the last long-format residential course personally conducted by the Swami before his death in 2015. Masetti completed his Vedanta studies and received the title of Acharya. He has cited Swami Sakshatkrtananda Saraswati, Swami Paramarthananda, Swami Tattvavidananda and Swami Viditatmananda among his influences.

== Recognition by the Indian government ==
=== Mann Ki Baat (2020) ===
In November 2020, Prime Minister Narendra Modi cited Masetti in his monthly radio program Mann Ki Baat, describing him as an ambassador of Vedic culture in the Americas and noting that his use of technology had brought Vedanta, Sanskrit and mantra teaching to a large Brazilian audience.

=== Visit by Prime Minister Modi (2024) ===
During the G20 summit in Rio de Janeiro in November 2024, Prime Minister Modi met Masetti in person and again praised his work in popularising Indian philosophy in Brazil.

=== Padma Shri (2025) ===
In January 2025, the Government of India announced the conferral of the Padma Shri on Masetti for his work in disseminating Vedanta and Vedic culture in Brazil and the wider West, in the category of Literature & Education. The investiture ceremony was held on 27 May 2025 at the Rashtrapati Bhavan in New Delhi, where he received the medal from President Droupadi Murmu.

== Vishva Vidya Organization ==
Founded in 2014 in Petrópolis, Rio de Janeiro, Instituto Vishva Vidya offers retreats and online courses on Vedanta, meditation, Sanskrit, mantras and Vedic tradition. The institute's name, chosen by Swami Dayananda, is a Sanskrit term meaning "Universal Knowledge".

In 2020, the institute began the construction of a gurukulam in Petrópolis — a residence for resident teachers — together with a separate cultural centre intended to introduce visitors to Vedic culture.

== Publications and media ==
=== Books ===
Masetti has authored several books in Portuguese on Vedanta and yoga, including Cânticos & versos: slokas, stotras, mantras, bhajans e kirtans da tradição védica; Fundamentos do Yoga: uma introdução à tradição védica; Yoga e Vedanta: tópicos essenciais; and a two-volume series Sabedoria dos Mestres. With Luciano Giorgio he co-translated Saddarsana and Upadeshasaram by Ramana Maharshi into Portuguese.

=== Podcast ===
He hosts the Portuguese-language podcast Vedanta Cast, which has published over a thousand episodes.

=== Films ===
Masetti produced the documentary UMA — Luz dos Himalaias (with Ananda Jyothi) and directed Kilasumak — O despertar de um guerreiro, shown at the Mostra Novo Cinema Indiano in Rio de Janeiro.
