= Sadguru Brahmeshanand Acharya Swami =

Indian spiritual guru (born 1981)

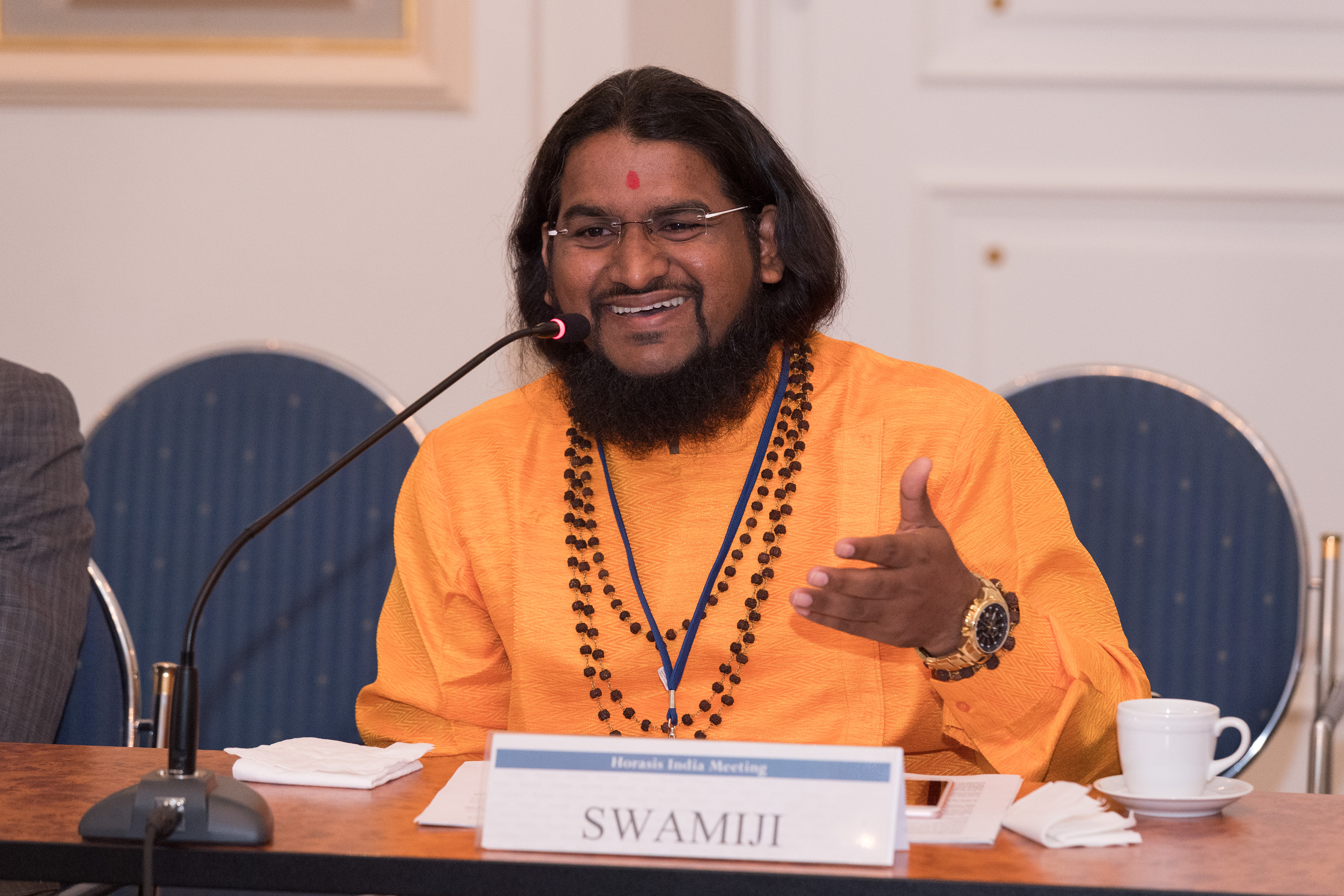
- Swami in 2017
- Born: 12 March 1981 (age 45)
- Awards: Padma Shri

Sadguru Brahmeshanand Acharya Swami (born 12 March 1981) is an Indian spiritual guru. He received Atmadnyan diksha and advaita vedanta as per guru–shishya tradition of Datta Padmanabh Peeth from Sadguru Brahmanandacharya Swami. He is conferred ‘Goa Swami

== Peace and humanitarian work ==
Swami is an ambassador of peace, interfaith leader, international speaker, spiritual and social reformer, vedic, and Sanskrit scholar. He is the founder and head of the International Sadguru Foundation working for world peace and harmony. Swami attended the opening plenary of the Parliament of the World's Religions at Chicago. Under his guidance, thousands of Hindus adorn janeu (Sacred Thread) at Tapobhoomi Gurupeeth and set the Asia Book of record for maximum number of people wearing janeu at the same time.
