= Shanti Lal Jain =

Indian banker and businessman

- Born: 1 January 1965 (age 60)
- Occupation: Banker
- Title: Former MD and CEO, Indian Bank
- Term: 1 September 2021-31 December 2024
- Predecessor: Padmaja Chunduru
- Successor: Binod Kumar

Shanti Lal Jain (born 1 January 1965) is a retired Indian banker. He served as Managing Director and Chief Executive Officer of Indian Bank. He was the former Executive Director of Bank of Baroda.

== Early life and education ==
Jain is a Post Graduate in Commerce.

== Career ==
Jain started his career in 1993 by joining Allahabad Bank and became the General Manager of the Bank .As the General Manager, he served as Chief Financial Officer, Chief Risk Officer and lead the IT department of the Bank. In September 2018, he joined as the Executive Director in Bank of Baroda. In 1 September 2021, he became the Managing Director and Chief Executive Officer of Indian Bank. He is also a member on the Managing Committee of Indian Banks' Association and the Insurance Advisory Committee of Insurance Regulatory and Development Authority.Thereafter, he retired on 31 December 2024.
