= Chintala Venkat Reddy =

Indian organic farmer

Chinthala Venkat Reddy
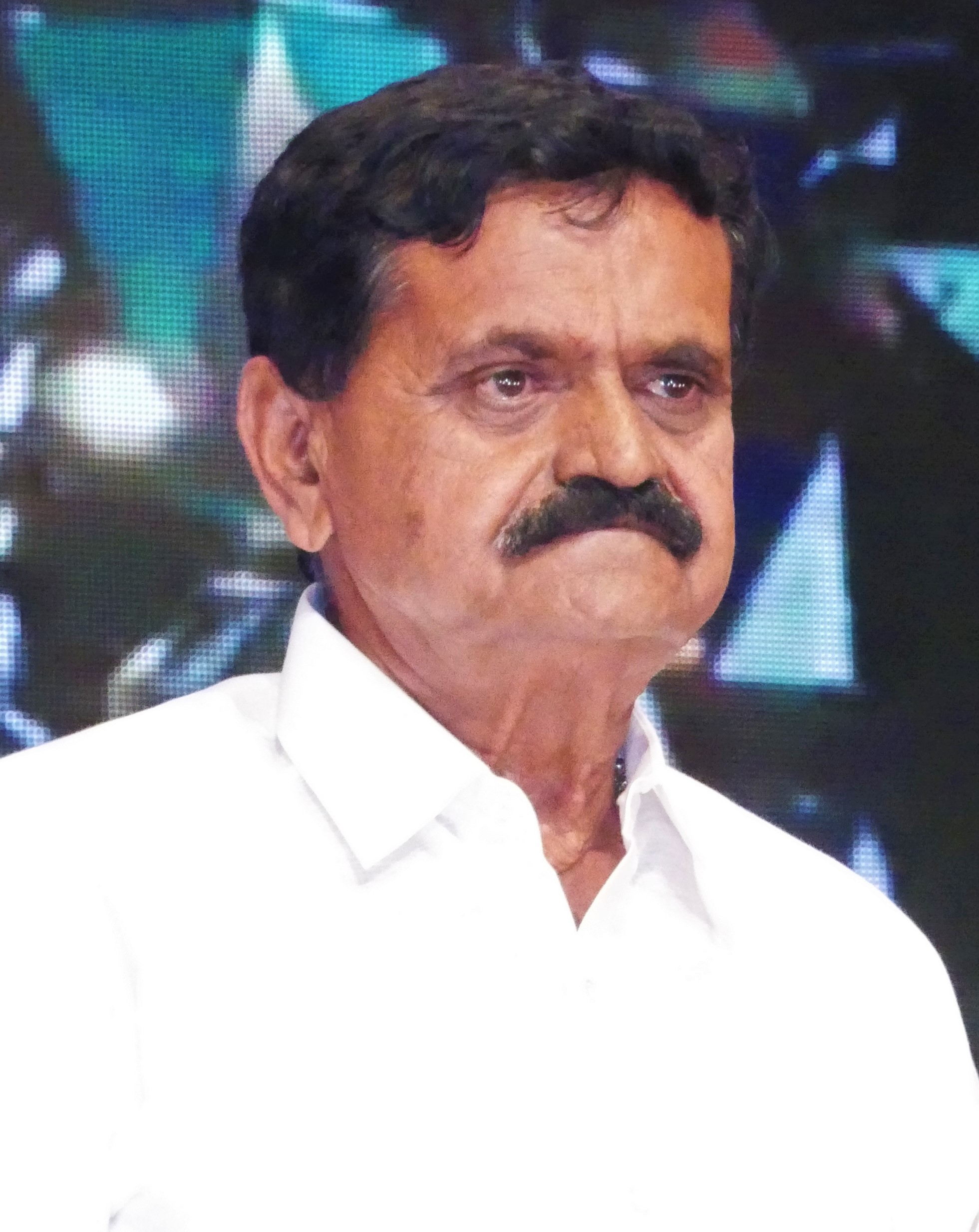
- Born: 22 December 1950 (age 75); Alwal, Secunderabad, Hyderabad State, India
- Occupation: Innovative Natural Farmer
- Known for: soil fertility, soil swapping

Chintala Venkat Reddy (born 22 December 1950) is an organic farmer known for his soil and nutrient management techniques in farming. He is the first independent farmer in India to receive an international patent for his technique in soil swapping and soil fertility.

He also holds national patents to his name. He does not use chemical fertilizer, insecticide or fungicide in the farming of rice, wheat, and vegetables. He has won several awards at State and National level for his organic farming techniques. He was awarded a Padma Shri award in 2020 for his contributions. There is no restriction in using his soil techniques.

== Early life ==
Venkat Reddy was born in Alwal in Secunderabad to Satyamma and Muthyam Reddy, a farming family. He is second among three brothers and three sisters. He passed his PUC (pre-university course or 12th standard) in English medium in Biological sciences near Secunderabad. His elder brother, C. Shankar Reddy was a farmer and his younger brother, Chintala Kanaka Reddy is an MLA from Malkajgiri constituency in Telangana. He has two daughters, and a son.

== Career ==
Venkat Reddy started helping his father on their fields from his school age, with milking and other farm chores. He discontinued his education after 12th, and started working full-time on their agriculture field in Alwal. He developed a keen interest and became a progressive and resourceful agriculturist. He has a 40-acre farmland in Kundanpally village in Keesara.

For his pioneering work, he was awarded a model farmer several times in the State. He showcased his SM techniques when Presidents of the United States, Bill Clinton in 2001 and George W. Bush in 2006 visited Hyderabad. He gifted 30 kg of Thomson, flame and black seedless grapes to both the presidents.

== Organic farming techniques ==
In 1979–80, he entered grape farming. He discovered early in 1982, when drought hit the region. While digging a well on the field, the soil filled water flowed all through their grape field. Unusually, the harvest doubled. He realized that the soiled water carried natural nutrients to the fields.

In 2003, he piloted his SM technique on one-acre land on paddy and wheat, and reaped double the normal harvest. His soil management is based on age old principle that the topsoil needs to be rejuvenated for depletion of nutrients. Instead of soil rejuvenation, farmers typically use more fertilizer to increase the harvest, which is counter productive.

=== Soil preparation ===
A trench is dug and subsoil from a depth of 4 feet, from a paddy field is scooped up using earth mover. As paddy roots grow not more than 3 feet deep. The soil mixed with castor cake, is dried in open air during summer months (March, April and May). The dried soil (Bhumi Supposhan) is carefully stored under a tarpaulin, for using all through the year. The sub soil can be put under the drip manually or through the drip, SubSoil mixed with flood water for paddy, or send through Rain pipe. Rain pipe has advantages when lifted up 4 feet above the ground by Y rods as it gives water mixed with sub soil rich in nutrients at regular intervals.

==== Soil as pesticide ====
The dry soil is filtered and made into a consistent liquid and is sprinkled on the stem, leaves on all crops, 2 times a week. The infested pests feed on clay-rich soil, as they cannot digest the soil content they die. Infestation of mealy bug, aphids, defoliating caterpillars, stem borer were eradicated.

==== Soil Spray as nutrient ====
The subsoil can be sprayed, composition differs from crop to crop, and quality of the soil sourced. The plant when it gets the required natural nutrients, the yield is almost double. The grape berry size increased, color and quality improved significantly. Sub soil spray increases the growth very fast and acts as pesticide on rice, wheat and vegetables and all crops. SubSoil spray has paved another revolution in Farming across India.

The technique was replicated to grape farm, yielding similar results. After consistent results, encouraged by scientists he applied for an international and national patent for the technique. The claim has been published by the Indian Patent Office in June 2012.

=== Higher yield with soil fertility ===
Increasing the soil quality it increased the yield by:

- Highest yield of 10.31 tonnes of paddy (BPT 5204 variety) per hectare against average 5 - 6.5 tonnes
- Highest yield of 6.5 tonnes of wheat (Lok 1 variety) per hectare against average 2.5 - 3 tonnes

For grape farming, a yield of 30-32 tonnes of grape per acre was achieved, whereas the average output, who make use of pesticides, fertilisers, gets a yield between 20 and 25 tonnes per acre.

=== Black beauty grape variety ===
He has an organic grape variety called as black beauty seedless grapes. The yield was 20 to 25 tonnes at his five-acre grape garden in Alwal.

=== Subsoil application on cattle ===
Venkat Reddy has 20 cows on his farm. He applied the subsoil on his cattle that helped in driving away insects and increased quality of milk and the output.

=== Organic brand ===
He has an organic brand, Venkat Reddy Satyam Mutyam, for other farmers to use if they use his techniques in farming.

== Study ==
The ICAR, ANGRAU (now Jayashnakar Agriculture University), CRIDA and Dr. YSR Horticultural University agriculture scientists monitored the crop yields by using his soil-based technique and certified the efficacy of the technique.

The agriculture scientists were impressed by the and consistent high-yields at lowest cost. Government of India did a systematic analysis of the Soil Management technique under the Rashtriya Krishi Vikas Yojana or RKVY Scheme, and made a publication.

== Recognition ==
- Patent on soil fertilisers, a process to improve nutrient content of the soil in cultivated lands (Soil swapping technique).
- Patent for method of improving soil fertility
- Padma Shri award 2020 by Govt. of India
