= Amai Mahalinga Naik =

Amai Mahalinga Naik (born 1945) is an innovative farmer from Adyanadka village in Dakshina Kannada district in the Indian State of Karnataka who single-handedly developed an organic agricultural farm with a zero-energy micro-irrigation system. This he achieved by digging tunnels deep into the sloping hills on which his land was located and tapping groundwater trapped in the bowels of the hills through the tunnels. In fact it was only in his sixth attempt in which he dug a tunnel of length 315 feet Naik could strike success. All the previous five attempts in which he dug tunnels of length at least 35 meters ended up in failing to strike a water source. The water sourced through this tunnel was used for watering the plants in his farm. After he struck success in his sixth attempt, he dug one more tunnel to bring water for drinking and household usage. The relentless pursuit of this tunneling operation earned him the nick name "The Tunnel Man of Karnataka". He also single-handedly constructed about 300 percolation trenches in the hills surrounding the farm and two revetments and a tank of 12,000 litres capacity to fill-up the revetments. His work transformed a deserted and barren plot of land into a lush oasis comprising arecanut palms, coconut trees, cashew trees, banana saplings and pepper vines. Naik’s farm has become a model-farmland and attracts over 1,000 visitors a year including several foreign tourists.

In the year 2022, Govt of India honoured Amai Mahalinga Naik by conferring the Padma Shri award for his contributions in the category referred to as "other fields".

== Early life ==
Amai Mahalinga Naik born in a village in Dakshina Kannada district has had no formal education and according to some reports, he is illiterate. He worked as an agriculture laborer plucking arecanuts and coconuts in and around Adyanadka. Observing his sincerity, a landloard Amai Mahabala Bhat donated two acres of barren land on the top of a hill to Naik in 1978. With no water sources in the nearby areas, he resorted to digging tunnels in search of water. The idea of digging tunnels was itself not very novel as there was an age-old tradition in the region of digging horizontal tunnels into hillocks to get water. In the Kannada language such tunnels are called Surangas. In his sixth attempt, Naik struck success.

It was Shree Padre, editor of the agricultural magazine Adike Pathrike, who made Naik's story public. Other farmers who learned of Naik's success story visited his farm to know more about his farming methods, particularly about his methods for ensuring water supply and for conserving water. The Times of India quotes Shree Padre as saying:

"He developed a sustainable, living resource from scratch. Today it has a good garden, water resource and sustainable man-made agriculture. To me, it’s a one-man army on a hill. Without his optimism and determination, the greenery could not have been developed. When he was digging suranga after failed suranga, people ridiculed him."

== Recognition ==
- In the year 2022, Govt of India conferred the Padma Shri award, the third highest award in the Padma series of awards, on Amai Mahalinga Naik for his distinguished service in the category referred to as "other fields". The award is in recognition of his service as a "Tribal organic farmer from Mangaluru, from being a labourer, single-handedly transforming a barren land into an organic tree farm."

== Other recognitions ==
- Naik and his farm was the subject of a documentary telecast on the History channel in April 2018.

== See also ==
- Padma Shri Award recipients in the year 2022
