= Lothkunta =

Lothkunta Alwal
- Neighbourhood
- Interactive map of Lothkunta
- Coordinates: 17°29′50″N 78°30′47″E
- Country: India
- State: Telangana
- District: Hyderabad
- Metro: Hyderabad

Government
  - Body: Cantonment Board

Languages
  - Official: Telugu
- Time zone: UTC+5:30 (IST)
- PIN: 500 015
- Lok Sabha constituency: Secunderabad
- Vidhan Sabha constituency: Secunderabad
- Planning agency: Cantonment Board

Lothkunta is a suburb in the Secunderabad cantonment on the northern border of Hyderabad city, Telangana, India.

It is situated at a distance of around 7 km from Secunderabad and approximately 14 km from Hyderabad. It lies on the national highway 7.

== Economy ==
Lothkunta is located in the commercial district within the cantonment area where restaurants, theatres, and other establishments can be found. This place is connected to Bollaram and Rashtrapati Nilayam.

== Transport ==
Lothkunta is 7 km away from Secunderabad Railway station, 12 km away from the Old Hyderabad Airport in Begumpet Begumpet Airport, and about 40 km from New International Airport in Shamshabad Rajiv Gandhi International Airport.

TSRTC runs buses here connecting Lothkunta to all parts of the city.

In 2021, the local residents opposed the construction of a wall by the defence authorities which has blocked the access roads to many local areas including Lothkunta, Bolarum and Alwal. For many others areas too, they have to go via Lothkunta, making the journey much longer. For example, Ammuguda to Lakdawala it used to be 2.5 km but now they have to travel over 5 km via Lothkunta. The Federation of North-Eastern Colonies of Secunderabad have written to the military authorities.
