= Sarbeswar Basumatary =

Indian farmer and integrated farming practitioner from Assam

- Born: April 8, 1962 (age 64); Panbari village, Chirang district, Assam, India
- Occupation: Farmer
- Known for: Integrated farming; intercropping; sericulture
- Awards: Padma Shri (2024); Assam Gaurav (2022–23); Award of Excellence in Sericulture, Central Silk Board (2015)

Sarbeswar Basumatary (born 8 April 1962) is an Indian farmer from Panbari village in Chirang district, Assam. He received the Padma Shri in 2024 for contributions to agriculture. He is known for practising integrated farming on a small landholding, combining fisheries, piggery, sericulture, horticulture, and intercropping.

== Early life ==
Basumatary was born into a Bodo tribal family in Panbari village in Assam's Chirang district. His parents worked as construction labourers. He completed his education up to Class 5 at Bagidwara LP School. As a young man, he worked as a daily wage labourer, earning as little as ₹2–3 a day, and at one point supplemented his income by digging coal.

== Agricultural work ==
Basumatary farms approximately 9 acres of his own land and leases an additional 15–16 acres. He practises integrated farming, combining areca nut cultivation with oranges and bananas, intercropping with ginger and khesari, and growing papaya and lemon along field boundaries. He is also known as "Chirang ke Krishi Chiraag" (The Lamp of Chirang's Farms).

He serves on the advisory board of the Fishery Department of Chirang District, and is a member of both the Krishi Vigyan Kendra and the Sericulture Board of Chirang District. Since 2017, he has worked as a promoter with the Bordosila Farmer Producer Company Limited.

Basumatary conducts training sessions and exposure visits for farmers in his region. He has also held interactive sessions for students on sustainable agriculture.

== Awards and recognition ==
Year	Award	Awarding body
2005	Fishery Department Award	Fishery Department, Bodoland Territorial Council
2015	Award of Excellence in Sericulture	Central Silk Board, Ministry of Textiles
2022	Best Farmer Award	Assam Agricultural University
2022–23	Assam Gaurav	Government of Assam
2024	Padma Shri	Government of India
