= Shanti Teresa Lakra =

Indian medical nurse

- Born: 1 May 1972 (age 54); Rangat, Middle Andamans, India
- Occupation: Medical nurse
- Spouse: Shaji Varghese
- Awards: Padma Shri; Florence Nightingale Award; Best Nurse of the Year
- Website: Official web site

Shanti Teresa Lakra is an Indian medical nurse and healthcare professional, known for her services to Onge tribe in the Andaman and Nicobar Islands, in the aftermath of the Tsunami of 2004. The Government of India honored Lakra in 2011, with the fourth highest civilian award of Padma Shri.

== Biography ==
In 2010, Shanti Teresa Lakra received the Florence Nightingale Award which is equivalent to the Dr. B. C. Roy National Award for doctors. The Florence Nightingale Award was given to her by Vice President Shri Hamid Ansari and after meeting her during the Award function, it was our Vice President who was so impressed with her that he nominated her for the Padma Shri. Let the story of Shanti Teresa Lakra be an inspiration for our nursing profession to work for the humanity and to aspire for such awards, wrote K. K. Aggarwal, an Indian cardiologist and Padma Shri award winner.

Shanti Teresa Lakra was born in a small hamlet called Rangat in the Middle Andamans, the Andaman and Nicobar Islands on 1 May 1972. After completing her studies in nursing, she started her career in 2001, as an Auxiliary Nurse and Midwife at the Directorate of Health Services, Andaman and Nicobar Administration. Her initial posting was at the Public Health Centre at Dugong Creek, the land of Onge people. She worked there for five years during which the Tsunami of 2004 caused devastation to the settlements. Lakra is reported to have lived in an open tent for two years, away from her own child, who was living with her mother in law during those days. A UNICEF trained health professional, Lakra worked with the Onge people which is known to have had a positive effect on the life expectancy of the dwindling Onge population.

Catholic Health Association of Andaman and Nicobar Islands (CHAANI) honored Lakra, in 2010, as the Best Nurse of the Year. The same year, the Government of India selected Lakra for the Florence Nightingale Award, the highest Indian award in the category of nursing healthcare. A year later, the government followed it up with the fourth highest civilian award of Padma Shri.

Shanti Teresa Lakra is married to Shaji Varghese who runs a small business unit. The couple has a son.
