= Akula Rajender =

Indian politician

- In office 2009–2014
- Constituency: Malkajgiri

Personal details
- Born: 8 June 1959 (age 66) Hyderabad
- Party: INC

Akula Rajender (born 1959) is an Indian politician belonging to the Indian National Congress. He is a Member of Legislative Assembly from Malkajgiri, Andhra Pradesh.

== Career ==
Akula Rajender was elected to Andhra Pradesh Legislative Assembly in 2009.
