= Venkat K. Reddy =

Chancellor of University of Colorado Colorado Springs

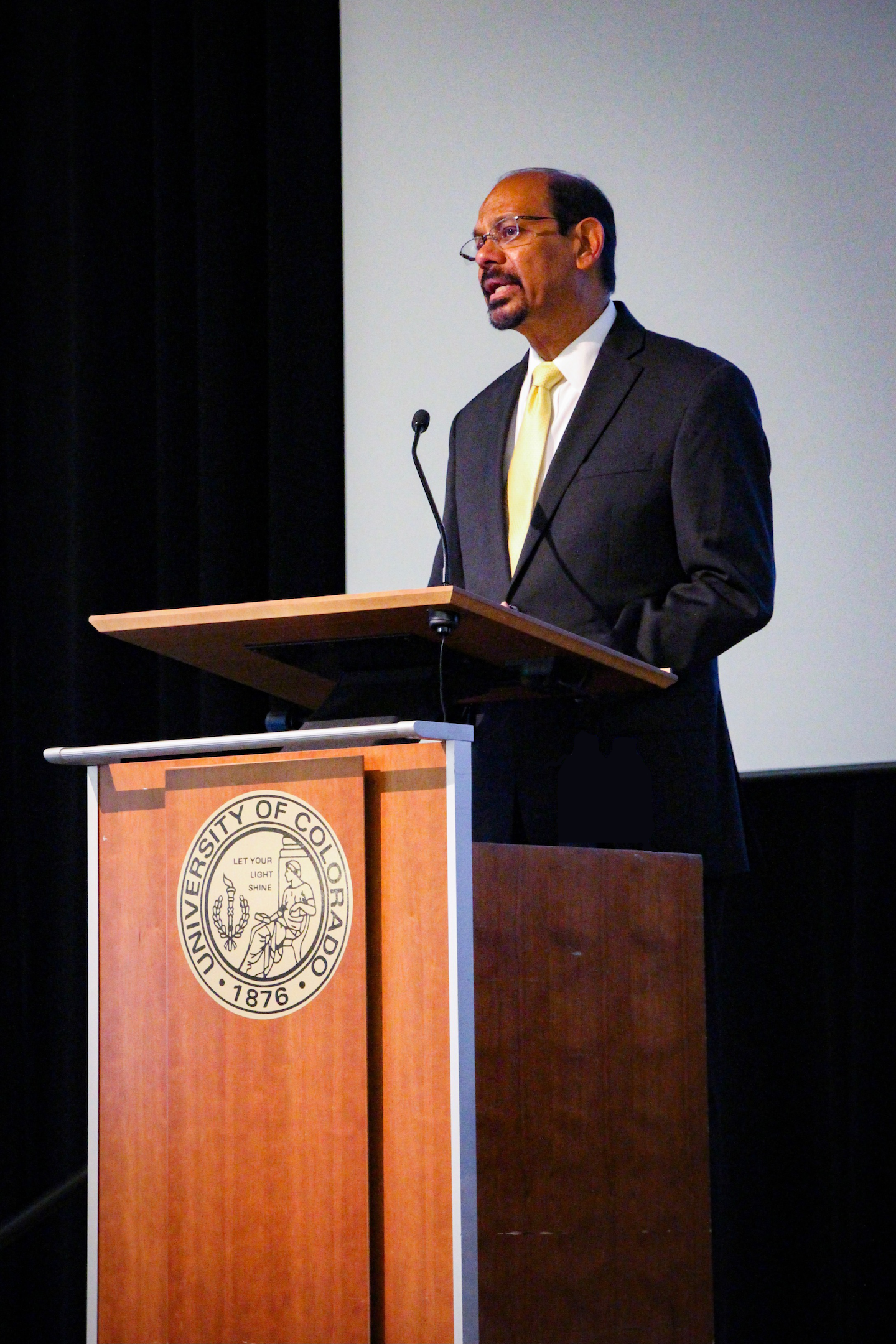
Chancellor Venkat Reddy delivers the University of Colorado Colorado Springs' 2021 State of the Campus address.

Venkat (Venkateshwar) K. Reddy (born 1961) was the seventh full-time chancellor of the University of Colorado Colorado Springs.

== Early life ==
Reddy was born and raised in Madanapalle, India. He earned a Bachelor of Science in agriculture from Acharya N. G. Ranga Agricultural University, previously named Andhra Pradesh Agricultural University, in 1983. He earned a Master of Science in agricultural economics from Pennsylvania State University in 1987, and completed a PhD in finance from Penn State in 1992.

== Career ==
Reddy worked as a graduate teaching assistant while earning master’s and doctoral degrees from Pennsylvania State University. In 1991, he joined the University of Colorado Colorado Springs as an instructor of finance. He became an assistant professor in 1992, an associate professor in 1999, and a full professor in 2004. Reddy served as interim dean of the College of Business from 2004 to 2005 before being named to the permanent position.

Following the retirement of Pamela Shockley-Zalabak, chancellor emerita of the University of Colorado Colorado Springs, Reddy was named interim chancellor of the university in February 2017. Reddy was named the seventh full-time chancellor of the University of Colorado Colorado Springs in May 2017, following a nationwide search process.

Reddy serves as an Honorary Commander for the United States Air Force Academy and is a board member for the National Cybersecurity Center. He continues to hold a tenured position as professor of finance in the University of Colorado Colorado Springs College of Business. His published research has focused on strategic financial investments and improvements to distance and online education programs.

== Initiatives ==
Under Reddy’s leadership, the University of Colorado Colorado Springs launched its 2030 strategic plan, focused on seven core strategies to advance the institution's priorities.

In 2020, Reddy began to expand mental health services for students and employees of the university. In 2021, he signed a partnership with the United States Space Force to collaborate on aerospace research and workforce development. He named the university’s first vice chancellor for diversity, equity and inclusion in December 2021. Under his leadership, the University of Colorado Colorado Springs opened the Lyda Hill Institute for Human Resilience and the William J. Hybl Sports Medicine and Performance Center.

While serving as dean of the College of Business, Reddy fundraised for the renovation of Dwire Hall, home of the UCCS College of Business. In 2004, he launched the Bachelor of Innovation degree, the first of its kind in the nation, and secured funds to support the Daniels Ethics Initiative. During this time, Reddy also served as associate vice chancellor for online education. He worked with several colleges on the campus to launch five fully online undergraduate degree programs in 2006.

== Personal life ==
Reddy married Lata Reddy in 1990. They have two children.
