= MediCiti Institute of Medical Sciences =

Medical college in Telangana, India

Coordinates: 17°37′02.3″N 78°32′48.9″E

- Seal of the Institute
- Type: Private medical college
- Established: 2002
- Affiliations: KNR University of Health Sciences
- Principal: Dr. M V Subba Rao
- Location: Medchal, Telangana, India
- Campus: Rural, 200 acres (forty acres occupied by the college)
- Website: mims.edu.in

MediCiti Institute of Medical Sciences (MIMS) is an Indian medical college affiliated with Kaloji Narayana Rao University of Health Sciences.

The campus is located in Medchal, thirty kilometres from Hyderabad, in the South Indian state of Telangana.

== History ==
The college is a tertiary-educational institute initiated under Science Health Allied-Research and Education (SHARE), a non-governmental organisation founded in 1985.

The institute's affiliated private hospital in urban Hyderabad served as a primary treatment centre for casualties following the 25 August 2007 Hyderabad bombings at Lumbini Park and Gokul Chat, a popular eatery in the city.

== Hospital ==
The original cardio-thoracic specialty hospital, established in 1992, today functions as a general-practice facility as well as a teaching hospital for the college.
