= Hukumchand Patidar =

Indian farmer and agriculture researcher

Hukumchand Patidar (born c. 1960) is an Indian farmer and agricultural innovator from Manpura village in Jhalawar district, Rajasthan. He is known for his contributions to organic farming and was honoured with the Padma Shri, India’s fourth-highest civilian award, in 2018 by the Government of India. In 2022, he was appointed as the only non-academic member of a 14-member national committee under the Indian Council of Agricultural Research (ICAR). This committee, part of the Union Ministry of Agriculture, is tasked with developing a curriculum for organic farming to be introduced in school boards and agricultural universities across India.
