= List of Padma Shri award recipients (2020–2029) =

Recipients of a civilian award in India

Padma Shri
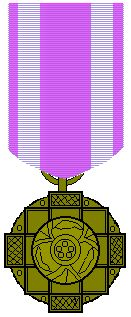
- Type: National Civilian
- Country: India
- Presented by: Government of India
- Ribbon
- Obverse: A centrally located lotus flower is embossed and the text "Padma" written in Devanagari script is placed above and the text "Shri" is placed below the lotus.
- Reverse: A platinum State Emblem of India placed in the centre with the national motto of India, "Satyameva Jayate" (Truth alone triumphs) in Devanagari Script
- Established: 1954
- First award: 1954

Precedence
- Next (higher): Padma Bhushan

The Padma Shri Award is India's fourth highest civilian honour. This article lists recipients for 2020–2026.

== Recipients ==
Award recipients by year
Year	Number of recipients
2020	118
2021	102
2022	107
2023	91
2024	110
2025	113
2026	111

Award recipients by field
Field	Number of recipients
Art	254
Civil Service	4
Literature and Education	150
Medicine	70
Others	52
Public Affairs	12
Science and Engineering	48
Social Work	78
Sports	43
Trade and Industry	31

Key
# Indicates a posthumous honour

List of Padma Shri award recipients showing year, field and State/Union Territory/Other Nationality
Year	#	Recipient	Field	State/Country
2020	1	Shashadhar Acharya	Arts	Jharkhand
2020	2	Yogi Aereon	Medicine	Uttarakhand
2020	3	Jai Prakash Agarwal	Trade & Industry	Delhi
2020	4	Jagdish Lal Ahuja	Social Work	Punjab
2020	5	Kazi Masum Akhtar	Literature & Education	West Bengal
2020	6	Gloria Arieira	Literature & Education	– (Note: Indicates a citizen of Brazil.)
2020	7	Khan Zaheerkhan Bakthtiyarkhan	Sports	Maharashtra
2020	8	Padmavathy Bandopadhyay	Medicine	Uttar Pradesh
2020	9	Sushovan Banerjee	Medicine	West Bengal
2020	10	Digambar Behera	Medicine	Chandigarh
2020	11	Popatrao Baguji Pawar	Social Work	Maharashtra
2020	12	Himmat Ram Bhambhu	Social Work	Rajasthan
2020	13	Sanjeev Bikhchandani	Trade & Industry	Uttar Pradesh
2020	14	Gafurbhai M. Bilakhia	Trade & Industry	Gujarat
2020	16	Bob Blackman	Public Affairs	– (Note: Indicates a citizen of the United Kingdom.)
2020	17	Indira P. P. Bora	Arts	Assam
2020	18	Madan Singh Chouhan	Arts	Chhattisgarh
2020	19	Usha Chaumar	Social Work	Rajasthan
2020	20	Lil Bahadur Chettri	Literature & Education	Assam
2020	21	Lalitha & Saroja Chidambaram (duo)	Arts	Tamil Nadu
2020	22	Vajira Chitrasena	Arts	– (Note: Indicates a citizen of Sri Lanka.)
2020	23	Purushottam Dadheech	Arts	Madhya Pradesh
2020	24	Utsav Charan Das	Arts	Odisha
2020	25	Indra Dassanayake (Note: Indra Dassanayake died in September 2019, at the age of 66.)#	Literature & Education	–
2020	26	H. M. Desai	Literature & Education	Gujarat
2020	27	Manohar Devadoss	Arts	Tamil Nadu
2020	28	Oinam Bembem Devi	Sports	Manipur
2020	29	Lia Diskin	Social Work	–
2020	30	M. P. Ganesh	Sports	Karnataka
2020	31	Bangalore Gangadhar	Medicine	Karnataka
2020	32	Raman Gangakhedkar	Science & Engineering	Maharashtra
2020	33	Barry Gardiner	Public Affairs	–
2020	34	Chewang Motup Goba	Trade & Industry	Ladakh
2020	35	Bharat Goenka	Trade & Industry	Karnataka
2020	36	Yadla Gopalarao	Arts	Andhra Pradesh
2020	37	Mitrabhanu Gountia	Arts	Odisha
2020	38	Tulasi Gowda	Social Work	Karnataka
2020	39	Sujoy K. Guha	Science & Engineering	Bihar
2020	40	Harekala Hajabba	Social Work	Karnataka
2020	41	Enamul Haque	Others	– (Note: Indicates a citizen of Bangladesh.)
2020	42	Madhu Mansuri Hasmukh	Arts	Jharkhand
2020	43	Abdul Jabbar Khan (Note: Abdul Jabbar Khan died in September 2019, at the age of 66.)#	Social Work	Madhya Pradesh
2020	44	Bimal Kumar Jain	Social Work	Bihar
2020	45	Meenakshi Jain	Literature & Education	Delhi
2020	46	Nemnath Jain	Trade & Industry	Madhya Pradesh
2020	47	Shanti Jain	Arts	Bihar
2020	48	Sudhir K. Jain	Science & Engineering	Gujarat
2020	49	Benichandra Jamatia	Literature & Education	Tripura
2020	50	K. V. Sampath Kumar and Jayalakhshmi K. S. (duo)	Literature & Education	Karnataka
2020	51	Karan Johar	Arts	Maharashtra
2020	52	Leela Joshi	Medicine	Madhya Pradesh
2020	53	Sarita Joshi	Arts	Maharashtra
2020	54	C. Kamlova	Literature & Education	Mizoram
2020	55	Ravi Kannan R	Medicine	Assam
2020	56	Ekta Kapoor	Arts	Maharashtra
2020	57	Yazdi Karanjia	Arts	Gujarat
2020	58	Narayan Joshi Karayal	Literature & Education	Gujarat
2020	59	Narindar Nath Khanna	Medicine	Uttar Pradesh
2020	60	Navin Khanna	Science & Engineering	Delhi
2020	61	S. P. Kothari	Literature & Education	– (Note: Indicates a citizen of the United States.)
2020	62	V. K. Munusamy	Arts	Puducherry
2020	63	M. K. Kunjol	Social Work	Kerala
2020	64	Manmohan Mahapatra (Note: Manmohan Mahapatra died on 13 January 2020, at the age of 69.)#	Arts	Odisha
2020	65	Anwar Khan Manganiyar	Arts	Rajasthan
2020	66	Kattungal Subramaniam Manilal	Science & Engineering	Kerala
2020	67	Munna Master	Arts	Rajasthan
2020	68	Abhiraj Rajendra Mishra	Literature & Education	Himachal Pradesh
2020	69	Binapani Mohanty	Literature & Education	Odisha
2020	70	Arunoday Mondal	Medicine	West Bengal
2020	71	Prithwindra Mukherjee	Literature & Education	– (Note: Indicates a citizen of France.)
2020	72	Sathyanarayan Mundayoor	Social Work	Arunachal Pradesh
2020	73	Manilal Nag	Arts	West Bengal
2020	74	N. Chandrasekharan Nair	Literature & Education	Kerala
2020	75	Tetsu Nakamura #	Social Work	– (Note: Indicates a citizen of Afghanistan.)
2020	76	Shiv Datt Nirmohi	Literature & Education	Jammu & Kashmir
2020	77	Lalbiakthanga Pachuau	Literature & Education	Mizoram
2020	78	Moozhikkal Pankajakshi	Arts	Kerala
2020	79	Prasanta Pattanaik	Literature & Education	–
2020	80	Jogendra Nath Phukan	Literature & Education	Assam
2020	81	Rahibai Soma Popere	Others	Maharashtra
2020	82	Thalappil Pradeep	Science & Engineering	Tamil Nadu
2020	83	Yogesh Praveen	Literature & Education	Uttar Pradesh
2020	84	Jitu Rai	Sports	Uttar Pradesh
2020	85	Tarundeep Rai	Sports	Sikkim
2020	86	S. Ramakrishnan	Social Work	Tamil Nadu
2020	87	Rani Rampal	Sports	Haryana
2020	88	Kangana Ranaut	Arts	Maharashtra
2020	89	Dalavai Chalapathi Rao	Arts	Andhra Pradesh
2020	90	Shahabuddin Rathod	Literature & Education	Gujarat
2020	91	Kalyan Singh Rawat	Social Work	Uttarakhand
2020	92	Chintala Venkat Reddy	Others	Telangana
2020	93	Shanti Roy	Medicine	Bihar
2020	94	Radha Mohan and Sabarmatee Tiki (duo)	Others	Odisha
2020	95	Batakrushna Sahoo	Others	Odisha
2020	96	Trinity Saioo	Others	Meghalaya
2020	97	Adnan Sami	Arts	Maharashtra
2020	98	Vijay Sankeshwar	Trade & Industry	Karnataka
2020	99	Kushal Konwar Sarma	Medicine	Assam
2020	100	Sayed Mehboob Shah Qadri	Social Work	Maharashtra
2020	101	Mohammed Sharif	Social Work	Uttar Pradesh
2020	102	Shyam Sharma	Arts	Bihar
2020	103	Gurdip Singh	Medicine	Gujarat
2020	104	Ramjee Singh	Social Work	Bihar
2020	105	Vashishtha Narayan Singh (Note: Vashishtha Narayan Singh died on 14 November 2019, at the age of 74.)#	Science & Engineering	Bihar
2020	106	Daya Prakash Sinha	Arts	Uttar Pradesh
2020	107	Sandra Desa Souza	Medicine	Maharashtra
2020	108	Vijayasarathi Sribhashyam	Literature & Education	Telangana
2020	109	Kalee Shabi and Sheik Mahaboob Subani Mahaboob (duo)	Arts	Tamil Nadu
2020	110	Javed Ahmad Tak	Social Work	Jammu and Kashmir
2020	111	Yeshe Dorjee Thongchi	Literature & Education	Arunachal Pradesh
2020	112	Robert Thurman	Literature & Education	–
2020	113	Agus Indra Udayana	Social Work	– (Note: Indicates a citizen of Indonesia.)
2020	114	Harish Chandra Verma	Science & Engineering	Uttar Pradesh
2020	115	Sundaram Verma	Social Work	Rajasthan
2020	116	Romesh Wadhwani	Trade & Industry	–
2020	117	Suresh Wadkar	Arts	Maharashtra
2020	118	Prem Watsa	Trade & Industry	– (Note: Indicates a citizen of Canada.)
2021	1	Gulfam Ahmed	Art	Uttar Pradesh
2021	2	Anitha Pauldurai	Sports	Tamil Nadu
2021	3	Subbu Arumugam	Arts	Tamil Nadu
2021	4	Asavadi Prakasarao	Literature and Education	Andhra Pradesh
2021	5	Bhuri Bai	Arts	Madhya Pradesh
2021	6	Radhe Shyam Barle	Arts	Chhattisgarh
2021	7	Dharma Narayan Barma	Literature and Education	West Bengal
2021	8	Lakhimi Baruah	Social Work	Assam
2021	9	Biren Kumar Basak	Arts	West Bengal
2021	10	Rajni Bector	Trade and Industry	Punjab
2021	11	Peter Brook	Art	–
2021	12	Sangkhumi Bualchhuak	Social Work	Mizoram
2021	13	Gopiram Bargayn Burabhakat	Art	Assam
2021	14	Bijoya Chakravarty	Public Affairs	Assam
2021	15	Sujit Chattopadhyay	Literature and Education	West Bengal
2021	16	Jagdish Chaudhary #	Social Work	Uttar Pradesh
2021	17	Tsultrim Chonjor	Social Work	Ladakh
2021	18	Mouma Das	Sports	West Bengal
2021	19	Srikant Datar	Literature and Education	–
2021	20	Narayan Debnath	Art	West Bengal
2021	21	Chutni Mahato	Social Work	Jharkhand
2021	22	Dulari Devi	Art	Bihar
2021	23	Radhe Devi	Art	Manipur
2021	24	Shanti Devi	Social Work	Odisha
2021	25	Wayan Dibia	Art	Indonesia
2021	26	Dadudan Gadhvi	Literature and Education	Gujarat
2021	27	Parshuram Atmaram Gangavane	Art	Maharashtra
2021	28	Jaibhagwan Goyal	Literature and Education	Haryana
2021	29	Jagadish Chandra Halder	Literature and Education	West Bengal
2021	30	Mangal Singh Hazowary	Literature and Education	Assam
2021	31	Anshu Jamsenpa	Sports	Arunachal Pradesh
2021	32	Purnamasi Jani	Art	Odisha
2021	33	Matha B. Manjamma Jogati	Art	Karnataka
2021	34	Kaithapram Damodaran Namboothiri	Art	Kerala
2021	35	Namdeo Kamble	Literature and Education	Maharashtra
2021	36	Mahesh Kanodia and Naresh Kanodia # (duo)	Art	Gujarat
2021	37	Rajat Kumar Kar	Literature and Education	Odisha
2021	38	Rangasami L. Kashyap	Literature and Education	Karnataka
2021	39	Prakash Kaur	Social Work	Punjab
2021	40	Nicholas Kazanas	Literature and Education	Greece
2021	41	K Kesavasamy	Art	Puducherry
2021	42	Ghulam Rasool Khan	Art	Jammu and Kashmir
2021	43	Lakha Khan	Art	Rajasthan
2021	44	Sanjida Khatun	Art	–
2021	45	Vinayak Vishnu Khedekar	Art	Goa
2021	46	Niru Kumar	Social Work	Delhi
2021	47	Lajwanti Chabra	Art	Punjab
2021	48	Rattan Lal	Science and Engineering	–
2021	49	Ali Manikfan	Others-Grassroots Innovation	Lakshadweep
2021	50	Ramchandra Manjhi	Art	Bihar
2021	51	Dulal Manki	Art	Assam
2021	52	Nanadro B Marak	Others- Agriculture	Meghalaya
2021	53	Rewben Mashangva	Art	Manipur
2021	54	Chandrakant Mehta	Literature and Education	Gujarat
2021	55	Rattan Lal Mittal	Medicine	Punjab
2021	56	O. M. Nambiar	Sports	Kerala
2021	57	Shyam Sunder Paliwal	Social Work	Rajasthan
2021	58	Chandrakant_Pandav	Medicine	Delhi
2021	59	Jitendra Nath Pande #	Medicine	Delhi
2021	60	Solomon Pappaiah	Literature and Education	Tamil Nadu
2021	61	Pappammal	Others- Agriculture	Tamil Nadu
2021	62	Krishna Mohan Pathi	Medicine	Odisha
2021	63	Jaswantiben Jamnadas Popat	Trade and Industry	Maharashtra
2021	64	Girish Prabhune	Social Work	Maharashtra
2021	65	Nanda Prusty	Literature and Education	Odisha
2021	66	K. K. Ramachandra Pulavar	Art	Kerala
2021	67	Balan Putheri	Literature and Education	Kerala
2021	68	Birubala Rabha	Social Work	Assam
2021	69	Kanaka Raju	Art	Telangana
2021	70	Bombay Jayashri	Art	Tamil Nadu
2021	71	Satyaram Reang	Art	Tripura
2021	72	Dhananjay Diwakar Sagdeo	Medicine	Kerala
2021	73	Ashok Kumar Sahu	Medicine	Uttar Pradesh
2021	74	Bhupendra Kumar Singh Sanjay	Medicine	Uttarakhand
2021	75	Sindhutai Sapkal	Social Work	Maharashtra
2021	76	Chaman Lal Sapru #	Literature and Education	Jammu and Kashmir
2021	77	Roman Sarmah	Literature and Education- Journalism	Assam
2021	78	Imran Shah	Literature and Education	Assam
2021	79	Prem Chand Sharma	Others- Agriculture	Uttarakhand
2021	80	Arjun Singh Shekhawat	Literature and Education	Rajasthan
2021	81	Ramyatna Shukla	Literature and Education	Uttar Pradesh
2021	82	Jitender Singh Shunty	Social Work	Delhi
2021	83	Kartar Paras Ram Singh	Art	Himachal Pradesh
2021	84	Kartar Singh	Art	Punjab
2021	85	Dilip Kumar Singh	Medicine	Bihar
2021	86	Chandra Shekhar Singh	Others-Agriculture	Uttar Pradesh
2021	87	Sudha Singh	Sports	Uttar Pradesh
2021	88	Virender Singh	Sports	Haryana
2021	89	Mridula Sinha #	Literature and Education	Bihar
2021	90	K. C. Sivasankaran #	Art	Tamil Nadu
2021	91	Kamali Soren	Social Work	West Bengal
2021	92	Marachi Subburaman	Social Work	Tamil Nadu
2021	93	P. Subramanian	Trade and Industry	Tamil Nadu
2021	94	Nidumolu Sumathi	Art	Andhra Pradesh
2021	95	Kapil Tiwari	Literature and Education	Madhya Pradesh
2021	96	Father Vallés #	Literature and Education	– (Note: Indicates a citizen of Spain.)
2021	97	Thiruvengadam Veeraraghavan #	Medicine	Tamil Nadu
2021	98	Sridhar Vembu	Trade and Industry	Tamil Nadu
2021	99	K. Y. Venkatesh	Sports	Karnataka
2021	100	Usha Yadav	Literature and Education	Uttar Pradesh
2021	101	Quazi Sazzad Ali Zahir	Public Affairs	–
2021	102	Annavarapu Rama Swamy	Art	Andhra Pradesh
2022	1	Prahlad Rai Agarwala	Trade and Industry	West Bengal
2022	2	Najma Akhtar	Literature and Education	Delhi
2022	3	Sumit Antil	Sports	Haryana
2022	4	T Senka Ao	Literature and Education	Nagaland
2022	5	Kamalini Asthana and Nalini Asthana (duo)	Art	Uttar Pradesh
2022	6	Subbanna Ayyappan	Science and Engineering	Karnataka
2022	7	J K Bajaj	Literature and Education	Delhi
2022	8	Sirpi Balasubramaniam	Literature and Education	Tamil Nadu
2022	9	Baba Balia	Social Work	Odisha
2022	10	Sanghamitra Bandyopadhyay	Science and Engineering	West Bengal
2022	11	Madhuri Barthwal	Art	Uttarakhand
2022	12	Akhone Asgar Ali Basharat	Literature and Education	Ladakh
2022	13	Himmatrao Bawaskar	Medicine	Maharashtra
2022	14	Harmohinder Singh Bedi	Literature and Education	Punjab
2022	15	Pramod Bhagat	Sports	Odisha
2022	16	S. Ballesh	Art	Tamil Nadu
2022	17	Khandu Wangchuk Bhutia	Art	Sikkim
2022	18	Maria Christopher Byrski	Literature and Education	Poland
2022	19	Acharya Chandanaji	Social Work	Bihar
2022	20	Sulochana Chavan	Art	Maharashtra
2022	21	Neeraj Chopra	Sports	Haryana
2022	22	Shakuntala Choudhary	Social Work	Assam
2022	23	Sankara Narayana Menon Chundayil	Sports	Kerala
2022	24	S Damodaran	Social Work	Tamil Nadu
2022	25	Faisal Ali Dar	Sports	Jammu and Kashmir
2022	26	Jagjit Singh Dardi	Trade and Industry	Chandigarh
2022	27	Prokar Dasgupta	Medicine	–
2022	28	Aditya Prasad Dash	Science and Engineering	Odisha
2022	29	Lata Desai	Medicine	Gujarat
2022	30	Malji Bhai Desai	Public Affairs	Gujarat
2022	31	Basanti Devi	Social Work	Uttarakhand
2022	32	Lourembam Bino Devi	Art	Manipur
2022	33	Muktamani Devi	Trade and Industry	Manipur
2022	34	Shyamamani Devi	Art	Odisha
2022	35	Khalil Dhantejvi #	Literature and Education	Gujarat
2022	36	Savaji Bhai Dholakia	Social Work	Gujarat
2022	37	Arjun Singh Dhurve	Art	Madhya Pradesh
2022	38	Vijaykumar Vinayak Dongre	Medicine	Maharashtra
2022	39	Chandraprakash Dwivedi	Art	Rajasthan
2022	40	Dhaneswar Engti	Literature and Education	Assam
2022	41	Om Prakash Gandhi	Social Work	Haryana
2022	42	Garikapati Narasimha Rao	Literature and Education	Andhra Pradesh
2022	43	Girdhari Ram Gonjhu #	Literature and Education	Jharkhand
2022	44	Shaibal Gupta #	Literature and Education	Bihar
2022	45	Narasingha Prasad Guru	Literature and Education	Odisha
2022	46	Gosaveedu Shaik Hassan #	Art	Andhra Pradesh
2022	47	Ryuko Hira	Trade and Industry	– (Note: Indicates a citizen of Japan.)
2022	48	Sosamma Iype	Others – Animal Husbandry	Kerala
2022	49	Avadh Kishore Jadia	Literature and Education	Madhya Pradesh
2022	50	Sowcar Janaki	Art	Tamil Nadu
2022	51	Tara Jauhar	Literature and Education	Delhi
2022	52	Vandana Katariya	Sports	Uttarakhand
2022	53	H. R. Keshava Murthy	Art	Karnataka
2022	54	Rutger Kortenhorst	Literature and Education	Ireland
2022	55	P. Narayana Kurup	Literature and Education	Kerala
2022	56	Avani Lekhara	Sports	Rajasthan
2022	57	M. L. Madan	Science and Engineering	Haryana
2022	58	Shivnath Mishra	Art	Uttar Pradesh
2022	59	Narendra Prasad Misra #	Medicine	Madhya Pradesh
2022	60	Darshanam Mogilaiah	Art	Telangana
2022	61	Guruprasad Mohapatra #	Civil Service	Delhi
2022	62	Thavil Kongampattu A V Murugaiyan	Art	Puducherry
2022	63	R Muthukannammal	Art	Tamil Nadu
2022	64	Abdul Khader Nadakattin	Others – Grassroots Innovation	Karnataka
2022	65	Amai Mahalinga Naik	Others – Agriculture	Karnataka
2022	66	Jamyang Tsering Namgyal	Art	Ladakh
2022	67	A. K. C. Natarajan	Art	Tamil Nadu
2022	68	V L Nghaka	Literature and Education	Mizoram
2022	69	Sonu Nigam	Art	Maharashtra
2022	70	Ram Sahay Panday	Art	Madhya Pradesh
2022	71	Chirapat Prapandavidya	Literature and Education	Thailand
2022	72	K. V. Rabiya	Social Work	Kerala
2022	73	Anil K. Rajvanshi	Science and Engineering	Maharashtra
2022	74	Sheesh Ram	Art	Uttar Pradesh
2022	75	Ramachandraiah	Art	Telangana
2022	76	Sunkara Venkata Adinarayana Rao	Medicine	Andhra Pradesh
2022	77	Gamit Ramilaben Raysingbhai	Social Work	Gujarat
2022	78	Gaddam Padmaja Reddy	Art	Telangana
2022	79	Guru Tulku Rinpoche	Others – Spiritualism	Arunachal Pradesh
2022	80	Brahmanand Sankhwalkar	Sports	Goa
2022	81	Vidyanand Sarek	Literature and Education	Himachal Pradesh
2022	82	Kalipada Soren	Literature and Education	West Bengal
2022	83	Veeraswamy Seshiah	Medicine	Tamil Nadu
2022	84	Prabhaben Shah	Social Work	Dadra and Nagar Haveli and Daman and Diu
2022	85	Dilip Shahani	Literature and Education	Delhi
2022	86	Ramdayal Sharma	Art	Rajasthan
2022	87	Vishwamurti Shastri	Literature and Education	Jammu and Kashmir
2022	88	Tatiana Lvovna Shaumyan	Literature and Education	– (Note: Indicates a citizen of Russia.)
2022	89	Siddhalingaiah #	Literature and Education	Karnataka
2022	90	Kaajee Singh	Art	West Bengal
2022	91	Konsam Ibomcha Singh	Art	Manipur
2022	92	Prem Singh	Social Work	Punjab
2022	93	Seth Pal Singh	Others – Agriculture	Uttar Pradesh
2022	94	Vidya Vindu Singh	Literature and Education	Uttar Pradesh
2022	95	Iqbal Singh	Social Work	Punjab
2022	96	Bhim Singhal	Medicine	Maharashtra
2022	97	Sivananda	Others – Yoga	Uttar Pradesh
2022	98	Ajay Kumar Sonkar	Science and Engineering	Uttar Pradesh
2022	99	Ajita Srivastava	Art	Uttar Pradesh
2022	100	Sadguru Brahmeshanand Acharya Swami	Others – Spiritualism	Goa
2022	101	Balaji Tambe #	Medicine	Maharashtra
2022	102	Raghuvendra Tanwar	Literature and Education	Haryana
2022	103	Kamalakar Tripathi	Medicine	Uttar Pradesh
2022	104	Lalita Vakil	Art	Himachal Pradesh
2022	105	Durga Bai Vyom	Art	Madhya Pradesh
2022	106	J. M. Vyas	Science and Engineering	Gujarat
2022	107	Badaplin War	Literature and Education	Meghalaya
2023	1	Sukama Acharya	Others – Spiritualism	Haryana
2023	2	Jodhaiya Bai Baiga	Art	Madhya Pradesh
2023	3	Premjit Baria	Art	Dadra and Nagar Haveli and Daman and Diu
2023	4	Usha Barle	Art	Chhattisgarh
2023	5	Munishwar Chandar Dawar	Medicine	Madhya Pradesh
2023	6	Hemant Chauhan	Art	Gujarat
2023	7	Bhanubhai Chitara	Art	Gujarat
2023	8	Hemoprova Chutia	Art	Assam
2023	9	Narendra Chandra Debbarma #	Public Affairs	Tripura
2023	10	Subhadra Devi	Art	Bihar
2023	11	Khader Vali	Science & Technology	Karnataka
2023	12	Hem Chandra Goswami	Art	Assam
2023	13	Pritikana Goswami	Art	West bengal
2023	14	Radha Charan Gupta	Literature & Education	Uttar Pradesh
2023	15	Modadugu Vijay Gupta	Science & Engineering	Telangana
2023	16	Ahmed and Mohammed Hussain (duo)	Art	Rajasthan
2023	17	Dilshad Hussain	Art	Uttar Pradesh
2023	18	Bhiku Ramji Idate	Social Work	Maharashtra
2023	19	C. I. Issac	Literature & Education	Kerala
2023	20	Rattan Singh Jaggi	Literature & Education	Punjab
2023	21	Bikram Bahadur Jamatia	Social Work	Tripura
2023	22	Ramkuiwangbe Jeme Newme	Social Work	Assam
2023	23	Rakesh Radheshyam Jhunjhunwala #	Trade & Industry	Maharashtra
2023	24	Ratan Chandra Kar	Medicine	Andaman & Nicobar Islands
2023	25	Mahipat Kavi	Art	Gujarat
2023	26	M. M. Keeravani	Art	Andhra Pradesh
2023	27	Areez Khambatta #	Trade & Industry	Gujarat
2023	28	Parshuram Komaji Khune	Art	Maharashtra
2023	29	K N Ganesh	Science & Engineering	Andhra Pradesh
2023	30	Maguni Charan Kuanr	Art	Odisha
2023	31	Anand Kumar	Literature & Education	Bihar
2023	32	Arvind Kumar	Science & Engineering	Uttar Pradesh
2023	33	Domar Singh Kunvar	Art	Chhattisgarh
2023	34	Risingbor Kurkalang	Art	Meghalaya
2023	35	Hirabai Lobi	Social Work	Gujarat
2023	36	Moolchand Lodha	Social Work	Rajasthan
2023	37	Rani Machaiah	Art	Karnataka
2023	38	Ajay Kumar Mandavi	Art	Chhattisgarh
2023	39	Prabhakar Bhanudas Mande	Literature & Education	Maharashtra
2023	40	Gajanan Jagannath Mane	Social Work	Maharashtra
2023	41	Antaryami Mishra	Literature & Education	Odisha
2023	42	Nadoja Pindipapanahalli Munivenkatappa	Art	Karnataka
2023	43	Mahendra Pal	Science & Engineering	Gujarat
2023	44	Uma Shankar Pandey	Social Work	Uttar Pradesh
2023	45	Ramesh Parmar and Shanti Parmar (duo)	Art	Madhya Pradesh
2023	46	Nalini Parthasarathi	Medicine	Puducherry
2023	47	Hanumantha Rao Pasupuleti	Medicine	Telangana
2023	48	Ramesh Patange	Literature & Education	Maharashtra
2023	49	Krishna Patel	Art	Odisha
2023	50	K Kalyanasundaram Pillai	Art	Tamil Nadu
2023	51	V. P. Appukutta Poduval	Social Work	Kerala
2023	52	Kapil Dev Prasad	Art	Bihar
2023	53	S R D Prasad	Sports	Kerala
2023	54	Shah Rasheed Ahmed Quadri	Art	Karnataka
2023	55	C. V. Raju	Art	Andhra Pradesh
2023	56	Bakshi Ram	Science & Engineering	Haryana
2023	57	Cheruvayal Raman	Others – Agriculture	Kerala
2023	58	Sujatha Ramdorai	Science & Engineering	Canada
2023	59	Abbareddy Nageswara Rao	Science & Engineering	Andhra Pradesh
2023	60	Paresh Rathwa	Art	Gujarat
2023	61	B. Ramakrishna Reddy	Literature & Education	Telangana
2023	62	Mangala Kanti Roy	Art	West Bengal
2023	63	K.C. Runremsangi	Art	Mizoram
2023	64	Vadivel Gopal & Shri Masi Sadaiyan (duo)	Social Work	Tamil Nadu
2023	65	Manoranjan Sahu	Medicine	Uttar Pradesh
2023	66	Patayat Sahu	Others – Agriculture	Odisha
2023	67	Ritwik Sanyal	Art	Uttar Pradesh
2023	68	Kota Satchidananda Sastry	Art	Andhra Pradesh
2023	69	Sankurathri Chandra Sekhar	Social work	Andhra Pradesh
2023	70	K Shanathoiba Sharma	Sports	Manipur
2023	71	Nekram Sharma	Others – Agriculture	Himachal Pradesh
2023	72	Gurcharan Singh	Sports	Delhi
2023	73	Laxman Singh	Social Work	Rajasthan
2023	74	Mohan Singh	Literature & Education	Jammu & Kashmir
2023	75	Thounaojam Chaoba Singh	Public Affairs	Manipur
2023	76	Prakash Chandra Sood	Literature & Education	Andhra Pradesh
2023	77	Neihunuo Sorhie	Art	Nagaland
2023	78	Janum Singh Soy	Literature & Education	Jharkhand
2023	79	Kushok Thiksey Nawang Chamba Stanzin	Others – Spiritualism	Ladakh
2023	80	S Subbaraman	Others – Archaeology	Karnataka
2023	81	Moa Subong	Art	Nagaland
2023	82	Palam Kalyana Sundaram	Social Work	Tamil Nadu
2023	83	Raveena Tandon	Art	Maharashtra
2023	84	Vishwanath Prasad Tiwari	Literature & Education	Uttar Pradesh
2023	85	Dhaniram Toto	Literature & Education	West Bengal
2023	86	Tula Ram Upreti	Others – Agriculture	Sikkim
2023	87	Gopalsamy Veluchamy	Medicine	Tamil nadu
2023	88	Ishwar Chander Verma	Medicine	Delhi
2023	89	Coomi Nariman Wadia	Art	Maharashtra
2023	90	Karma Wangchu #	Social work	Arunachal Pradesh
2023	91	Ghulam Muhammad Zaz	Art	Jammu & Kashmir
2024	1	Parbati Barua	Social work	Assam
2024	2	Khalil Ahamad	Art	Uttar Pradesh
2024	3	Badrappan M	Art	Tamil Nadu
2024	4	Kaluram Bamaniya	Art	Madhya Pradesh
2024	5	Rezwana Choudhury Bannya	Art	–
2024	6	Naseem Bano	Art	Uttar Pradesh
2024	7	Ramlal Bareth	Art	Chhattisgarh
2024	8	Gita Roy Barman	Art	West Bengal
2024	9	Sarbeswar Basumatary	Others – Agriculture	Assam
2024	10	Som Datt Battu	Art	Himachal Pradesh
2024	11	Takdira Begum	Art	West Bengal
2024	12	Sathyanarayana Beleri	Others – Agriculture	Kerala
2024	13	Drona Bhuyan	Art	Assam
2024	14	Ashok Kumar Biswas	Art	Bihar
2024	15	Rohan Bopanna	Sports	Karnataka
2024	16	Smriti Rekha Chakma	Art	Tripura
2024	17	Narayan Chakraborty	Science & Engineering	West Bengal
2024	18	A Velu Ananda Chari	Art	Telangana
2024	19	Ram Chet Chaudhary	Science & Engineering	Uttar Pradesh
2024	20	K Chellammal	Others – Agriculture	Andaman & Nicobar Islands
2024	21	Joshna Chinappa	Sports	Tamil Nadu
2024	22	Charlotte Chopin	Others – Yoga	–
2024	23	Raghuveer Chaudhari	Literature & Education	Gujarat
2024	24	Joe D'Cruz	Literature & Education	Tamil Nadu
2024	25	Ghulam Nabi Dar	Art	Jammu & Kashmir
2024	26	Chitta Maharaj	Others – Spiritualism	Tripura
2024	27	Uday Vishwanath Deshpande	Sports	Maharashtra
2024	28	Prema Dhanraj	Medicine	Karnataka
2024	29	Radha Krishan Dhiman	Medicine	Uttar Pradesh
2024	30	Manohar Krishana Dole	Medicine	Maharashtra
2024	31	Pierre-Sylvain Filliozat	Literature & Education	–
2024	32	Mahabir Singh Guddu	Art	Haryana
2024	33	Anupama Hoskere	Art	Karnataka
2024	34	Yazdi Italia	Medicine	Gujarat
2024	35	Rajaram Jain	Literature & Education	Uttar Pradesh
2024	36	Janki Lal Bhand	Art	Rajasthan
2024	37	Ratan Kahar	Art	West Bengal
2024	38	Yashwant Singh Katoch	Literature & Education	Uttarakhand
2024	39	Zahir Ishaq Kazi	Literature & Education	Maharashtra
2024	40	Gaurav Khanna	Sports	Uttar Pradesh
2024	41	Surendra Kishore	Literature & Education	Bihar
2024	42	Dasari Kondappa	Art	Telangana
2024	43	Sridhar Makam Krishnamurthy	Literature & Education	Karnataka
2024	44	Yanung Jamoh Lego	Others – Agriculture	Arunachal Pradesh
2024	45	Jordan Lepcha	Art	Sikkim
2024	46	Satendra Singh Lohia	Sports	Madhya Pradesh
2024	47	Binod Maharana	Art	Odisha
2024	48	Purnima Mahato	Sports	Jharkhand
2024	49	Uma Maheshwari D	Art	Andhra Pradesh
2024	50	Dukhu Majhi	Social Work	West Bengal
2024	51	Ram Kumar Mallick	Art	Bihar
2024	52	Hemchand Manjhi	Medicine	Chhattisgarh
2024	53	Chandrashekhar Mahadeorao Meshram	Medicine	Maharashtra
2024	54	Surendra Mohan Mishra #	Art	Uttar Pradesh
2024	55	Ali Mohammed and Ghani Mohammed (duo)	Art	Rajasthan
2024	56	Kalpana Morparia	Trade & Industry	Maharashtra
2024	57	Chami Murmu	Social Work	Jharkhand
2024	58	Sasindran Muthuvel	Public Affairs	– (Note: Indicates a citizen of Papua New Guinea.)
2024	59	G Nachiyar	Medicine	Tamil Nadu
2024	60	Kiran Nadar	Art	Delhi
2024	61	Pakaravur Chithran Namboodiripad #	Literature & Education	Kerala
2024	62	Narayanan E P	Art	Kerala
2024	63	Shailesh Nayak	Science & Engineering	Delhi
2024	64	Harish Nayak #	Literature & Education	Gujarat
2024	65	Fred Negrit	Literature & Education	–
2024	66	Hari Om	Science & Engineering	Haryana
2024	67	Bhagabat Padhan	Art	Odisha
2024	68	Sanatan Rudra Pal	Art	West Bengal
2024	69	Shankar Baba Pundlikrao Papalkar	Social Work	Maharashtra
2024	70	Radhe Shyam Pareek	Medicine	Uttar Pradesh
2024	71	Dayal Mavjibhai Parmar	Medicine	Gujarat
2024	72	Binod Kumar Pasayat	Art	Odisha
2024	73	Silbi Passah	Art	Meghalaya
2024	74	Shanti Devi Paswan and Shivan Paswan (duo)	Art	Bihar
2024	75	Sanjay Anant Patil	Others – Agriculture	Goa
2024	76	Muni Narayana Prasad	Literature & Education	Kerala
2024	77	K S Rajanna	Social Work	Karnataka
2024	78	C. R. Chandrashekar	Medicine	Karnataka
2024	79	Bhagwatilal Rajpurohit	Literature & Education	Madhya Pradesh
2024	80	Romalo Ram	Art	Jammu & Kashmir
2024	81	Navjivan Rastogi	Literature & Education	Uttar Pradesh
2024	82	Nirmal Rishi	Art	Punjab
2024	83	Pran Sabharwal	Art	Punjab
2024	84	Gaddam Sammaiah	Art	Telangana
2024	85	Sangthankima	Social Work	Mizoram
2024	86	Machihan Sasa	Art	Manipur
2024	87	Omprakash Sharma	Art	Madhya Pradesh
2024	88	Eklabya Sharma	Science & Engineering	West Bengal
2024	89	Ram Chander Sihag	Science & Engineering	Haryana
2024	90	Harbinder Singh	Sports	Delhi
2024	91	Gurvinder Singh	Social Work	Haryana
2024	92	Godawari Singh	Art	Uttar Pradesh
2024	93	Ravi Prakash Singh	Science & Engineering	– (Note: Indicates a citizen of Mexico.)
2024	94	Seshampatti T Sivalingam	Art	Tamil Nadu
2024	95	Somanna	Social Work	Karnataka
2024	96	Kethavath Somlal	Literature & Education	Telangana
2024	97	Shashi Soni	Trade & Industry	Karnataka
2024	98	Urmila Srivastava	Art	Uttar Pradesh
2024	99	Nepal Chandra Sutradhar #	Art	West Bengal
2024	100	Gopinath Swain	Art	Odisha
2024	101	Laxman Bhatt Tailang	Art	Rajasthan
2024	102	Maya Tandon	Social Work	Rajasthan
2024	103	Aswathi Thirunal Gowri Lakshmi Bayi	Literature & Education	Kerala
2024	104	Jagdish Labhshanker Trivedi	Art	Gujarat
2024	105	Sano Vamuzo	Social Work	Nagaland
2024	106	Sadanam P. V. Balakrishnan	Art	Kerala
2024	107	Kurella Vittalacharya	Literature & Education	Telangana
2024	108	Kiran Vyas	Others – Yoga	–
2024	109	Jageshwar Yadav	Social Work	Chhattisgarh
2024	110	Babu Ram Yadav	Art	Uttar Pradesh
2025	1	Adwaita Gadanayak	Art	Odisha
2025	2	Achyut Ramchandra Palav	Art	Maharashtra
2025	3	Ajay Bhatt	Science and Engineering	–
2025	4	Anil Kumar Boro	Literature and Education	Assam
2025	5	Arijit Singh	Art	West Bengal
2025	6	Arundhati Bhattacharya	Trade and Industry	Maharashtra
2025	7	Arunoday Saha	Literature and Education	Tripura
2025	8	Arvind Sharma	Literature and Education	–
2025	9	Ashok Kumar Mahapatra	Medicine	Odisha
2025	10	Ashok Saraf	Art	Maharashtra
2025	11	Ashutosh Sharma	Science and Engineering	Uttar Pradesh
2025	12	Ashwini Bhide-Deshpande	Art	Maharashtra
2025	13	Baijnath Maharaj	Others – Spiritualism	Rajasthan
2025	14	Barry Godfray John	Art	Delhi
2025	15	Begam Batool	Art	Rajasthan
2025	16	Bharat Gupt	Art	Delhi
2025	17	Bheru Singh Chouhan	Art	Madhya Pradesh
2025	18	Bhim Singh Bhavesh	Social Work	Bihar
2025	19	Bhimavva Doddabalappa Shillekyathara	Art	Karnataka
2025	20	Budhendra Kumar Jain	Medicine	Madhya Pradesh
2025	21	C. S. Vaidyanathan	Public Affairs	NCT Delhi
2025	22	Chaitram Deochand Pawar	Social Work	Maharashtra
2025	23	Chandrakant Sheth #	Literature and Education	Gujarat
2025	24	Chandrakant Sompura	Others – Architecture	Gujarat
2025	25	Chetan Chitnis	Science and Engineering	–
2025	26	David R. Syiemlieh	Literature and Education	Meghalaya
2025	27	Durga Charan Ranbir	Art	Odisha
2025	28	Farooq Ahmad Mir	Art	Jammu And Kashmir
2025	29	Ganeshwar Shastri Dravid	Literature and Education	Uttar Pradesh
2025	30	Gita Upadhyay	Literature and Education	Assam
2025	31	Gokul Chandra Das	Art	West Bengal
2025	32	Guruvayur Dorai	Art	Tamil Nadu
2025	33	Harchandan Singh Bhatty	Art	Madhya Pradesh
2025	34	Hariman Sharma	Others – Agriculture	Himachal Pradesh
2025	35	Harjinder Singh Srinagar Wale	Art	Punjab
2025	36	Harvinder Singh	Sports	Haryana
2025	37	Hassan Raghu	Art	Karnataka
2025	38	Hemant Kumar	Medicine	Bihar
2025	39	Hriday Narayan Dixit	Literature and Education	Uttar Pradesh
2025	40	Hugh and Colleen Gantzer # (duo)	Literature and Education – Journalism	Uttarakhand
2025	41	Inivalappil Mani Vijayan	Sports	Kerala
2025	42	Jagadish Joshila	Literature and Education	Madhya Pradesh
2025	43	Jaspinder Narula	Art	Maharashtra
2025	44	Jonas Masetti	Others – Spiritualism	Brazil
2025	45	Joynacharan Bathari	Art	Assam
2025	46	Jumde Yomgam Gamlin	Social Work	Arunachal Pradesh
2025	47	Chef Damu	Others – Culinary	Tamil Nadu
2025	48	K L Krishna	Literature and Education	Andhra Pradesh
2025	49	K. Omanakutty	Art	Kerala
2025	50	Kishore Kunal #	Civil Service	Bihar
2025	51	L Hangthing	Others – Agriculture	Nagaland
2025	52	Lakshmipathy Ramasubbaiyer	Literature and Education – Journalism	Tamil Nadu
2025	53	Lalit Kumar Mangotra	Literature and Education	Jammu and Kashmir
2025	54	Lama Lobzang #	Others – Spiritualism	Ladakh
2025	55	Libia Lobo Sardesai	Social Work	Goa
2025	56	M D Srinivas	Science and Engineering	Tamil Nadu
2025	57	Madugula Nagaphani Sarma	Art	Andhra Pradesh
2025	58	Mahavir Nayak	Art	Jharkhand
2025	59	Mamata Shankar	Art	West Bengal
2025	60	Manda Krishna Madiga	Public Affairs	Telangana
2025	61	Maruti Chitampalli	Literature and Education	Maharashtra
2025	62	Miriyala Apparao #	Art	Andhra Pradesh
2025	63	Nagendra Nath Roy	Literature and Education	West Bengal
2025	64	Bhulai Bhai #	Public Affairs	Uttar Pradesh
2025	65	Naren Gurung	Art	Sikkim
2025	66	Neerja Bhatla	Medicine	NCT Delhi
2025	67	Nirmala Devi	Art	Bihar
2025	68	Nitin Nohria	Literature and Education	–
2025	69	Onkar Singh Pahwa	Trade and Industry	Punjab
2025	70	P Datchanamoorthy	Art	Puducherry
2025	71	Pandi Ram Mandavi	Art	Chhattisgarh
2025	72	Lavjibhai Parmar	Art	Gujarat
2025	73	Pawan Kumar Goenka	Trade and Industry	West Bengal
2025	74	Prashanth Prakash	Trade and Industry	Karnataka
2025	75	Pratibha Satpathy	Literature and Education	Odisha
2025	76	Purisai Kannappa Sambandan	Art	Tamil Nadu
2025	77	Ravichandran Ashwin	Sports	Tamil Nadu
2025	78	R. G. Chandramogan	Trade and Industry	Tamil Nadu
2025	79	Radha Bhatt	Social Work	Uttarakhand
2025	80	Radhakrishnan Devasenapathy	Art	Tamil Nadu
2025	81	Ramdarash Mishra	Literature and Education	NCT Delhi
2025	82	Ranendra Bhanu Majumdar	Art	Maharashtra
2025	83	Ratan Parimoo	Art	Gujarat
2025	84	Rebakanta Mahanta	Art	Assam
2025	85	Renthlei Lalrawna	Literature and Education	Mizoram
2025	86	Ricky Kej	Art	Karnataka
2025	87	Sajjan Bhajanka	Trade and Industry	West Bengal
2025	88	Sally Holkar	Trade and Industry	Madhya Pradesh
2025	89	Sant Ram Deswal	Literature and Education	Haryana
2025	90	Satyapal Singh	Sports	Uttar Pradesh
2025	91	Seeni Viswanathan	Literature and Education	Tamil Nadu
2025	92	Sethuraman Panchanathan	Science and Engineering	–
2025	93	Sheikha Shaikha Ali Al-Jaber Al-Sabah	Medicine	– (Note: Indicates a citizen of Kuwait.)
2025	94	Sheen Kaaf Nizam	Literature and Education	Rajasthan
2025	95	Shyam Bihari Agrawal	Art	Uttar Pradesh
2025	96	Soniya Nityanand	Medicine	Uttar Pradesh
2025	97	Stephen Knapp	Literature and Education	–
2025	98	Subhash Khetulal Sharma	Others – Agriculture	Maharashtra
2025	99	Suresh Harilal Soni	Social Work	Gujarat
2025	100	Surinder Vasal	Science and Engineering	Delhi
2025	101	Swami Pradiptananda	Others – Spiritualism	West Bengal
2025	102	Syed Ainul Hasan	Literature and Education	Uttar Pradesh
2025	103	Tejendra Narayan Majumdar	Art	West Bengal
2025	104	Thiyam Suryamukhi Devi	Art	Manipur
2025	105	Tushar Durgeshbhai Shukla	Literature and Education	Gujarat
2025	106	Vadiraj Panchamukhi	Literature and Education	Andhra Pradesh
2025	107	Vasudeo Kamath	Art	Maharashtra
2025	108	Velu Aasaan	Art	Tamil Nadu
2025	109	Venkappa Ambaji Sugatekar	Art	Karnataka
2025	110	Vijay Nityanand Surishwar	Others – Spiritualism	Bihar
2025	111	Vijayalakshmi Deshamane	Medicine	Karnataka
2025	112	Vilas Dangre	Medicine	Maharashtra
2025	113	Vinayak Lohani	Social Work	West Bengal
2026	1	A E Muthunayagam	Science and Engineering	Kerala
2026	2	Anil Kumar Rastogi	Art	Uttar Pradesh
2026	3	Anke Gowda	Social Work	Karnataka
2026	4	Armida Fernandez	Medicine	Maharashtra
2026	5	Arvind Vaidya	Art	Gujarat
2026	6	Ashok Khade	Trade and Industry	Maharashtra
2026	7	Ashok Kumar Singh	Science and Engineering	Uttar Pradesh
2026	8	Baldev Singh	Sports	Punjab
2026	9	Bhagwandas Raikwar	Sports	Madhya Pradesh
2026	10	Bharat Singh Bharti	Art	Bihar
2026	11	Bhiklya Ladakya Dhinda	Art	Maharashtra
2026	12	Bishwa Bandhu #	Art	Odisha
2026	13	Brij Lal Bhat	Social Work	Jammu and Kashmir
2026	14	Buddha Rashmi Mani	Others – Archaeology	Uttar Pradesh
2026	15	Budhri Tati	Social Work	Chhattisgarh
2026	16	Chandramouli Gaddamanugu	Science and Engineering	Telangana
2026	17	Charan Hembram	Literature and Education	Odisha
2026	18	Chiranji Lal Yadav	Art	Uttar Pradesh
2026	19	Deepika Reddy	Art	Telangana
2026	20	Dharmiklal Chunilal Pandya	Art	Gujarat
2026	21	Rajendra Prasad	Art	Andhra Pradesh
2026	22	Gafruddin Mewati Jogi	Art	Rajasthan
2026	23	Gambir Singh Yonzone	Literature and Education	West Bengal
2026	24	Garimella Balakrishna Prasad #	Art	Andhra Pradesh
2026	25	Gayatri Balasubramanian and Ranjani Balasubramanian (duo)	Art	Tamil Nadu
2026	26	Gopal Ji Trivedi	Science and Engineering	Bihar
2026	27	Guduru Venkat Rao	Medicine	Telangana
2026	28	H. V. Hande	Medicine	Tamil Nadu
2026	29	Hally War	Social Work	Meghalaya
2026	30	Hari Madhab Mukhopadhyay #	Art	West Bengal
2026	31	Haricharan Saikia	Art	Assam
2026	32	Harmanpreet Kaur	Sports	Punjab
2026	33	Inderjit Singh Sidhu	Social Work	Chandigarh
2026	34	Janardhan Bapurao Bothe	Social Work	Maharashtra
2026	35	Jogesh Deuri	Others – Agriculture	Assam
2026	36	Juzer Vasi	Science and Engineering	Maharashtra
2026	37	Jyotish Debnath	Art	West Bengal
2026	38	K. Pajanivel	Sports	Puducherry
2026	39	K Ramasamy	Science and Engineering	Tamil Nadu
2026	40	K. Vijay Kumar	Civil service	Tamil Nadu
2026	41	Kabindra Purkayastha #	Public Affairs	Assam
2026	42	Kailash Chandra Pant	Literature and Education	Madhya Pradesh
2026	43	Kalamandalam Vimala Menon	Art	Kerala
2026	44	Kewal Krishan Thakral	Medicine	Uttar Pradesh
2026	45	Khem Raj Sundriyal	Social Work	Haryana
2026	46	Kollakkayil Devaki Amma	Others – Environment	Kerala
2026	47	Krishnamurty Balasubramanian	Science and Engineering	Telangana
2026	48	Kumar Bose	Art	West Bengal
2026	49	Kumarasamy Thangaraj	Science and Engineering	Telangana
2026	50	Lars-Christian Koch	Art	– (Note: Indicates a citizen of Germany.)
2026	51	Liudmila Viktorovna Khokhlova	Literature and Education	–
2026	52	R. Madhavan	Art	Maharashtra
2026	53	Murali Mohan	Art	Andhra Pradesh
2026	54	Mahendra Kumar Mishra	Literature and Education	Odisha
2026	55	Mahendra Nath Roy	Literature and Education	West Bengal
2026	56	Mamidala Jagadesh Kumar	Literature and Education	Delhi
2026	57	Mangala Kapoor	Literature and Education	Uttar Pradesh
2026	58	Mir Hajibhai Kasambhai	Art	Gujarat
2026	59	Mohan Nagar	Social Work	Madhya Pradesh
2026	60	Narayan Vyas	Others – Archaeology	Madhya Pradesh
2026	61	Naresh Chandra Dev Varma	Literature and Education	Tripura
2026	62	Nilesh Vinodchandra Mandlewala	Social Work	Gujarat
2026	63	Nuruddin Ahmed	Art	Assam
2026	64	Othuvar Thiruthani Swaminathan	Art	Tamil Nadu
2026	65	Padma Gurmet	Medicine	Ladakh
2026	66	Palkonda Vijay Anand Reddy	Medicine	Telangana
2026	67	Pokhila Lekthepi	Art	Assam
2026	68	Prabhakar Kore	Literature and Education	Karnataka
2026	69	Prateek Sharma	Medicine	–
2026	70	Praveen Kumar	Sports	Uttar Pradesh
2026	71	Prem Lal Gautam	Science and Engineering	Himachal Pradesh
2026	72	Prosenjit Chatterjee	Art	West Bengal
2026	73	Punniamurthy Natesan	Medicine	Tamil Nadu
2026	74	R Krishnan #	Art	Tamil Nadu
2026	75	R. V. S. Mani	Civil Service	Delhi
2026	76	Rabilal Tudu	Literature and Education	West Bengal
2026	77	Raghupat Singh #	Others – Agriculture	Uttar Pradesh
2026	78	Raghuveer Tukaram Khedkar	Art	Maharashtra
2026	79	Rajastapathi Kaliappa Goundar	Art	Tamil Nadu
2026	80	Rajendra Prasad	Medicine	Uttar Pradesh
2026	81	Rama Reddy Mamidi #	Others – Animal Husbandry	Telangana
2026	82	Ramamurthy Sreedher	Others – Radio Broadcasting	Delhi
2026	83	Ramachandra Godbole and Suneeta Godbole (duo)	Medicine	Chhattisgarh
2026	84	Ratilal Borisagar	Literature and Education	Gujarat
2026	85	Rohit Sharma	Sports	Maharashtra
2026	86	S. G. Susheelamma	Social Work	Karnataka
2026	87	Sangyusang S Pongener	Art	Nagaland
2026	88	Sant Niranjan Dass	Others – Spiritualism	Punjab
2026	89	Sarat Kumar Patra	Art	Odisha
2026	90	Saroj Mandal	Medicine	West Bengal
2026	91	Satish Shah #	Art	Maharashtra
2026	92	Satyanarayan Nuwal	Trade and Industry	Maharashtra
2026	93	Savita Punia	Sports	Haryana
2026	94	Shafi Shauq	Literature and Education	Jammu and Kashmir
2026	95	Shashi Shekhar Vempati	Literature and Education	Karnataka
2026	96	Shrirang Devaba Lad	Others – Agriculture	Maharashtra
2026	97	Shubha Venkatesha Iyengar	Science and Engineering	Karnataka
2026	98	Shyam Sundar	Medicine	Uttar Pradesh
2026	99	Simanchal Patro	Art	Odisha
2026	100	Sivasankari	Literature and Education	Tamil Nadu
2026	101	Suresh Hanagavadi	Medicine	Karnataka
2026	102	Ayushman Pratap Singh	Trade and Industry	Uttar Pradesh
2026	103	T. T. Jagannathan #	Trade and Industry	Karnataka
2026	104	Taga Ram Bheel	Art	Rajasthan
2026	105	Tarun Bhattacharya	Art	West Bengal
2026	106	Techi Gubin	Trade	Arunachal Pradesh
2026	106	Thiruvarur Bakthavathsalam	Art	Tamil Nadu
2026	107	Tripti Mukherjee	Art	West Bengal
2026	108	Veezhinathan Kamakoti	Science and Engineering	Tamil Nadu
2026	109	Vempaty Kutumba Sastry	Literature and Education	Andhra Pradesh
2026	110	Vladimer Mestvirishvili #	Sports	– (Note: Indicates a citizen of Georgia.)
2026	111	Yumnam Jatra Singh #	Art	Manipur

== See also ==
- List of Padma Shri award recipients (2010–2019)
- List of Padma Shri award recipients (2000–2009)
- List of Padma Shri award recipients (1990–1999)
- List of Padma Shri award recipients (1980–1989)
- List of Padma Shri award recipients (1970–1979)
- List of Padma Shri award recipients (1960–1969)
- List of Padma Shri award recipients (1954–1959)

== Explanatory notes ==
Non-citizen recipients

Posthumous recipients
