= Narasingha Prasad Guru =

Indian writer

Narasingha Prasad Guru is an author and a lyricist from the Indian State of Odisha. He is a pioneer and a promoter of the Koshali language, also known as the Sambalpuri language, which is a language (some people consider it as a dialect of the Odiya language) spoken in the western parts of Odisha. He has composed over 10 books in this language and composed around 500 songs. He has also compiled a dictionary of the Koshali language.

== Recognition: Padma Shri ==
- In the year 2022, Govt of India conferred the Padma Shri award, the third highest award in the Padma series of awards, on Narasingha Prasad Guru for his distinguished service in the field of literature and education. The award is in recognition of his service as an "Koshali author, lyricist and lexicographer from Balangir credited with promoting the language for over five decades".

== Publications ==
The books published by Narasingha Prasad Guru include:

- Mati Akasha
- Paschma Odishara Lok Katha (Vol-1,2)
- Ama Loka Gita Loka Nacha
- Ama Anchalara Itihas Katha
- Ama Anchalara Gaunli Khela
- Utara Purusha
- Paschima Odishara Darshaniya Stana
- Sala Banara Raja
- Raja Ghara Maja Katha
- Muthae Mati
- Tirtha Mati
- Gote Mali Changre Phool,

== See also ==
- Padma Shri Award recipients in the year 2022
