= C. Kamlova =

Litterateur from Mizoram

- Born: Mizoram, India
- Citizenship: Indian
- Occupation: Litterateur
- Awards: Padma Shri (2020)

C. Kamlova is a litterateur from Mizoram state. He was awarded the Padma Shri, India's fourth highest civilian honor, for his contribution to Hindi literature and education. Earlier, he received the 'Bhasha Bharti Award' from the Central Institute of Indian Languages in Mysore in 2003-04 for his Hindi-language book with the title ''Anubhav ki Diuphant''. Kamlova made significant contributions to the development of the Hindi language in Mizoram. He has organized a number of workshops to raise awareness of Hindi among the Mizos. In 2000, he contributed in the recognition of the "Hindi Praveen" (Hindi BA) program, which was initiated by the government.

== See also ==
- List of Padma Shri award recipients (2020–2029)
