= Radhe Shyam Barle =

Panthi folk dancer and artist

- Born: 1966 (age 59–60); Khola village, Durg district, Chhattisgarh, India
- Occupation: Folk dancer
- Awards: Padma Shri, (2021)

Radhe Shyam Barle (born 9 October 1966) is a Panthi folk dancer and artist. In 2021, he was awarded India's fourth-highest civilian award the Padma Shri by the Government of India for his contribution in the field of art. Barle has made his contribution in promoting and disseminating the messages of Baba Guru Ghasidas through Panthi, a folk dance form in Chhattisgarh.

== Early life ==
Barle was born in 1966 in village Khola of Patan tehsil in Durg district of Chhattisgarh, India. He holds an MBBS and later completed a diploma in folk music from Indira Kala Sangeet Vishwavidyalaya. He is a regular artist in Doordarshan and All India Radio and has also participated and performed in many Mahotsav (festivals) across the country.

He is the recipient of various awards such as the Devdas Banjare Award, Guru Ghasidas Social Consciousness Award, Dalit Upliftment Award, Kalasadak Samman, Dr. Bhawar Singh Tribal Seva Samman, Social Harmony Award and Dau Mahasing Chandrakar Award.

== See also ==
- List of Padma Shri award recipients (2020–2029)
