= Patayat Sahu =

Indian farmer, healer

- Occupations: Farmer, Vaidya (Traditional Healer)
- Known for: Traditional healer
- Awards: Padma Shri

Patayat Sahu is an Indian farmer and traditional healer who hails from the small village of Nandol in Kalahandi. He is a vaidya by night and a farmer by day. He is reported not to demand any fee for the treatment but accepts whatever the people offer to him. He prepares the medicine from the herbs and plants that he grows in his garden. Upon recognition of his service to people, he was awarded a Padma Shri in 2023.

== Early life and career ==
He started learning about traditional medicine at a young age. In his own words, he started it as a hobby. His grandfather was a vaidya, a traditional healer. Behind his house, over 1.5 acres of land, he grew a garden which comprised a wide range of 3,000 medicinal plants. It was developed 40 years ago, and since then, he kept adding new medicinal plant species to it. He collected many of these species from different forests of Kalahandi.

Out of 3000 medicinal plant species present in his garden, he is reported to have collected almost 500 species from various parts of India. The Odisha Medicinal Plant Board facilitated his visits to different parts of India.

Prime Minister Narendra Modi also praised him for creating such a useful medicinal plant garden.

== See also ==
List of Padma Shri award recipients (2020–2029)
