= V L Nghaka =

Indian academic (born 1930)

V L Nghaka (born 1930) is an academic from the Indian State of Mizoram known for his efforts for the propagation and development of the Hindi language in Mizoram. He authored the first Hind-Mizo dictionary and got it published in the year 1965. In the year 2022, Govt of India honoured V L Nghaka by conferring the Padma Shri award for his contributions to literature and education. As per his citation for Padma Shri award, "He built a cultural bridge between Hindi and Mizo language by drafting a Hindi-Mizo dictionary. As an interpreter, he was instrumental in bringing the government and Mizo people closer.”

== Early life ==
V L Nghaka was born in 1930. He is the first person from the Mizo ethnic group to pass the Shiksha Visharad a qualifying examination for school teachers. Much later, in 1976, he secured the MA degree and in 1980 the MEd degree.

Early in life he became an ardent promoter of the Hindi language in Mizoram. In 1954, when the present Mizoram State had not been created, he took the initiative to establish the first Mizoram Assam Hindi Prachar Samiti at Kawnpui Village in the northern part of Mizoram. This institution later evolved and developed into the Mizoram Hindi Prachar Sabha. At the time of the PadmaShri award to Nghaka, the Sabha has 18 schools with BA Hindi course, 35 Prachar centres and 64 Vidhyalayas.

Nghaka is the author of several books intended to help popularize Hindi education. These include a book on Hindi grammar, a book to help prepare for Hindi Examination "Hindi Pariksha Sahayika" and most importantly a Mizo-Hindi Dictionary. The dictionary was published in 1965.

Because of his fluency in Hindi language, he often served as an interpreter between Hindi speaking govt officials and local people. This role later expanded as the role of a peacemaker between the Indian Army and the Mizo National Front during the period of insurgency in Mizoram. He helped to secure bails for many Mizo prisoners negotiating with the authorities, paying bail money from his own pocket and by signing Bail Bonds.

== Recognition ==
- In the year 2022, Govt of India conferred the Padma Shri award, the third highest award in the Padma series of awards, on V L Nghaka for his distinguished service in the field of literature and education. The award is in recognition of his service as a "Hindi author and translator from Aizwal, known for developing Hindi-Mizo dictionary."

== See also ==
- Padma Shri Award recipients in the year 2022
