= Muktamani Devi =

Indian innovator and entrepreneur

- Born: Manipur
- Occupation(s): Innovator and entrepreneur
- Known for: Mukta Shoes Industry
- Awards: Padma Shri award in 2022
- Website: https://www.muktashoes.com

Muktamani Devi (born in December 1958), also known as Moirangthem Muktamani Devi, is an innovator and entrepreneur from the Indian State of Manipur who, from humble beginnings, founded a firm to manufacture hand knitted woolen shoes. The shoes are manufactured in Mukta Shoes Industry, established in 1990 and located in Kakching, Manipur. The firm is registered with the District Industries Center, Thoubal under wool and knitting embroidery section.

She also gives training to people in the craft of making shoes. She has already trained more than 1000 people.

== Early life ==
Muktamani Devi, born in December 1958 and hailing from Kakching Moirangthem, Manipur, was raised by her widowed mother. She was married when she was only 17 years old. Muktamani used to work in a paddy field in the day and sell homemade snacks in the evening. She also used to knit carry bags and hair bands at night and would sell them to earn some extra money. Her initiation to the world of entrepreneurship was accidental. It happened in 1989. When her daughter requested a new pair of shoes to replace her old worn-out shoes, unable to raise the money required to buy a new pair of shoes, Muktamani knitted woolen shoes for her daughter. These hand-knitted shoes caught the attention of the class teacher and friends and they demanded to make similar shoes for themselves. Muktamani immediately realized the opportunity and decided to start a small unit for the commercial production of hand-knitted woolen shoes. She founded the Mukta Shoes Industry, and in due course, due to sheer hard work in promoting the products, the products of Mukta Shoes Industry found their way to national and international markets.

== Recognition: Padma Shri ==
- In the year 2022, Govt of India conferred the Padma Shri award, the third highest award in the Padma series of awards, on Muktamani Devi for her distinguished service in the field of trade and Industry. The award is in recognition of her service as an "Inspirational Woman Entrepreneur from Manipur exporting and popularizing handcrafted woolen shoes".

== Other recognitions/achievements ==
- Winner in the All Manipur Industry Mela (1993)
- MSME Prize, Govt of India (2006 and 2009)
- Citigroup Micro Entrepreneurship Award (National Award) (2006)
- State Award to Master Craftsperson (2008)
- Vasundhara NE Woman Entrepreneur of the Year 2013-14 (2015)
- True Legends Awards 2018 instituted by National Insurance and The Telegraph

== See also ==
- Padma Shri Award recipients in the year 2022

== Additional reading ==
- Rishika Agarwal. "How a Manipur mother's hand-knitted shoes found global market". 30 Stades. 30 Stades.com.
