= Lalbiakthanga Pachuau =

Indian journalist

- Born: 25 March 1927 (age 99); Saichal Mizoram, India
- Occupations: Journalist; Writer
- Known for: Oldest Mizo Journalist
- Spouse: Lalbiaksangi
- Children: 6
- Parent(s): Satkunga and Dokungi
- Awards: Padma Shri

Lalbiakthanga Pachuau (born 25 March 1927) is an Indian journalist from Mizoram. He has been declared as the oldest working journalist in India by the Mizoram Journalist Association. He was awarded the Padma Shri on 8 November 2021.

== Career ==
Lalbiakthanga Pachuau joined Assam Regiment of the British Indian Army in 1945 and fought against the Japanese forces for the British during World War-II. He started his career in journalism with Zoram Thupuan in 1953. Later he started his own local daily ‘Zoram Tlangau’ from 1970.

== Awards and honors ==
- Padma Shri (2021)
- Burma Star(1939–45)
- Independent Medal (1947)
- J&K General Service Medal (1947–48)
- Sainya Seva Medal

== Personal life ==
Pachuau was born on March 25, 1927, at Saichal village, 80 km away from the state capital of Aizawl. His parents were Pu Satkunga(L) and Pi Dokungi(L).
