= Uday Vishwanath Deshpande =

- Born: 20 July 1953 (age 72); Mumbai, Maharashtra, India
- Citizenship: India
- Education: Bachelor of Science
- Alma mater: University of Mumbai
- Occupation: Mallakhamb coach
- Years active: 1973–present
- Known for: Promoting and revitalizing Mallakhamb worldwide
- Notable work: Padma Shri award recipient
- Awards: Padma Shri
- Website: deshpandeuday.com

Uday Vishwanath Deshpande (born 20 July 1953) is an Indian Mallakhamb coach and Padma Shri awardee recognized for his contributions to the Indian sport of Mallakhamb. Deshpande has been instrumental in promoting Mallakhamb at a global level, conducting workshops and training sessions in over 48 countries.

== Early life ==
Deshpande was born in Mumbai, Maharashtra. He completed his B.Sc. in Chemistry and Botany from the University of Mumbai in 1973. Deshpande is married to Sukhada and has two children, Omkar and Aditi. His family has been supportive of his career, with his daughter Aditi also involved in teaching aerial silk in the United States.

== Career ==
Deshpande began his career as a Mallakhamb coach in the early 1970s. He is currently the chief coach at Shree Samartha Vyayam Mandir in Mumbai, where he has trained thousands of students. Under his guidance, Mallakhamb has not only revived in India but also gained international attention.

== Awards and recognition ==
In 2024, Deshpande was awarded the Padma Shri, India's fourth-highest civilian award, for his efforts in sports. He is often referred to as the 'Mallakhamb Pitamah' for his pioneering work in popularizing the sport.

== Legacy and impact ==
Deshpande's work in Mallakhamb has led to its inclusion in sports curricula across several countries, creating a new generation of instructors and practitioners. His initiatives have significantly contributed to the sport's recognition as a means to enhance physical and mental fitness.
