= P. Subramanian =

Indian businessman

- பி. சுப்பிரமணியன்
- Born: 1941 (age 84–85)
- Died: December 11, 2020 (aged 78–79); Coimbatore, Tamil Nadu, India
- Other names: Gear Man of Coimbatore
- Occupations: Businessperson; Philanthropist
- Organization(s): Shanthi Gears; Shanthi Social Services
- Known for: Contributions to gear industry, Philanthropy through Shanthi Social Services
- Spouse: Shanthi (deceased)
- Children: 3 daughters
- Awards: Padma Shri (2021)

P. Subramanian was an Indian businessman, founder and promoter of Shanthi Gears. He is noted for his contributions to the gear industry and his philanthropy. He was known as the 'gear man of Coimbatore'. He was posthumously conferred India's fourth highest civilian honour, Padma Shri, in 2021.

He was the founder and trustee of a social welfare organization called, Shanthi Social Services, which he had started to serve the people. His organization runs restaurants, hospitals, dispensaries, and petrol pumps on a non-profit basis.

== Career ==
He founded Shanthi Gears in the 1970s, which was acquired by Tube Investments of India Limited in 2012. In 1972, he converted it into a private company named Shanthi Gear Products (Private) Limited, focusing on manufacturing gears for the textile sector. The company got itself listed on the stock exchange in 1986 and became India's third-largest player in the gears industry. In 2012, Shanthi Gear Products was acquired by the Murugappa Group's Tube Investments of India for Rs 464 crore, including a public open offer for a 26% stake, in Shanthi Gears.

In 1996, he founded Shanthi Social Services, which runs canteens, healthcare facilities and other outreach activities. Shanthi became popular among the public due to the high quality of food and service offered at low prices. It provides education to underprivileged sections of society and helps with the construction of roads, school buildings, etc. The foundation also owns and runs not-for-profit hospitals, pharmacies, a diagnostic centre, a blood bank, an eye-care centre and an LPG crematorium. Shanthi Social Services is named after his late wife, Shanthi.

== Death ==
P. Subramanian died at the age of 79 on December 11, 2020. Three daughters survive him. The Chief Minister of Tamil Nadu, Edappadi K. Palaniswami paid condolence, saying he was deeply saddened to hear the news of P. Subramanian's demise.

== Awards and recognition ==
He was posthumously honoured with Padma Shri, the fourth-highest civilian award in India, by the Government of India in 2021 for contribution to the trade, industry and community service.
