= Charlotte Chopin =

French Yoga instructor (born 1922)

- Born: 11 December 1922 (age 103); Lere, Cher, France
- Occupation: Yoga instructor
- Known for: Yoga teaching and promotion
- Awards: Padma Shri (2024)

Charlotte Chopin (born 11 December 1922) is a French yoga instructor and centenarian recognized for her contributions to the field of yoga in France and her advocacy for its benefits on holistic well-being. In 2024, she was awarded the Padma Shri by the Republic of India, becoming one of the few non-Indian citizens to receive the award.

== Early life and personal life ==
Chopin was born in Lere, a small town in Cher, France. She began practicing Yoga at the age of 50 and credits her longevity and health to her yoga practice, advocating it as a means to improve quality of life. Despite her age, Chopin continues to teach and practice yoga actively.

== Career and recognition ==
Chopin started teaching yoga shortly after she began practicing and has taught thousands of students over the past five decades. She operates a yoga studio in her hometown and conducts workshops across the country.

In May 2024, Chopin was awarded the Padma Shri by the President of India for her efforts in "defying age-limiting norms" and promoting yoga as a tool for holistic health. This accolade places her among a select group of non-Indians recognized for their contributions to cultural ties with India.

Chopin has been featured in various French media outlets discussing the benefits of yoga for older adults and appeared on the French TV show "France's Got Incredible Talent," showcasing her yoga skills.
