= Kushal Konwar Sarma =

Indian medical person and Padma Shri awardee

- Born: Assam, India
- Occupation: Veterinarian
- Known for: Elephant doctor
- Medical career
- Field: Surgery and radiology
- Awards: Padma Shri

Kushal Konwar Sarma (Assamese: কুশল কোঁৱৰ শৰ্মা) is an Indian Veterinarian from Assam. Famous as the elephant doctor of Assam, Sarma was awarded the Padma Shri in the field of medicine in 2020.

== Career ==
Sarma is an elephant veterinarian and professor and Head of the department of Surgery and Radiology at the College of Veterinary Science in Guwahati, Assam. Sharma had worked tirelessly to treat animals, mostly elephants. He has tamed 139 captive rogue jumbos. He has also tamed around 100 wild elephants for treatment and translocation. On average, he treats or tames 750-800 elephants a year.

== Awards ==
- Padma Shri - 4th highest civilian award of India, was given to him on 26 January 2020.
