= Bharat Singh Bharti =

Indian Bhojpuri folk singer and composer

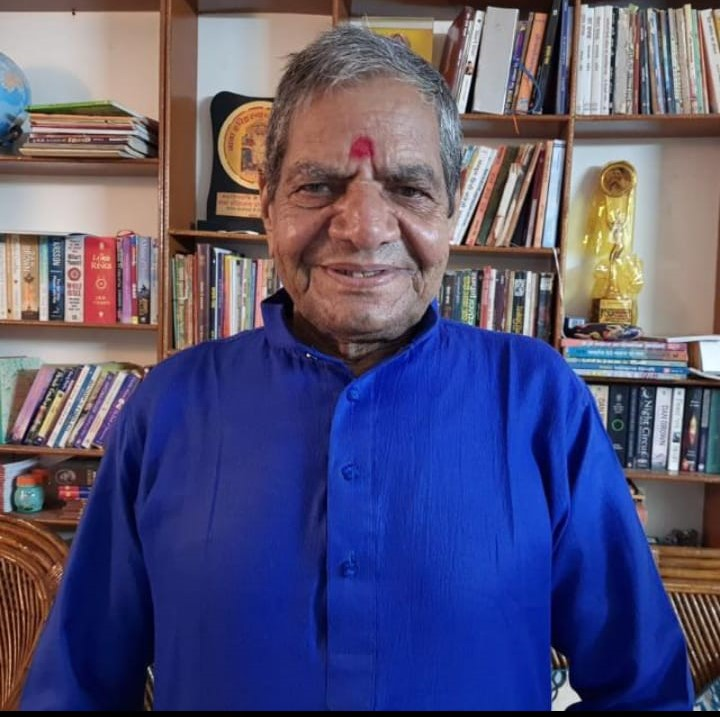
- Bharat Singh Bharti in 2019

Background information
- Born: Bharat Singh Bharti; November 20, 1936 (age 89); Nonaur, Bhojpur district, Bihar, British India
- Origin: Bihar, India
- Genre: Bhojpuri folk
- Occupations: Singer; composer; lyricist; folk musician
- Instruments: Vocals; tabla; harmonium; flute; sitar; dholak; jhal
- Years active: c. 1950s–present

Bharat Singh Bharti (born 20 November 1936) is an Indian Bhojpuri folk singer, composer and lyricist from Bihar. He is known for performing Bhojpuri folk music and for a longstanding association with All India Radio Patna. In 2026 he received the Padma Shri, India’s fourth-highest civilian honour, for his contribution to the arts, particularly Bhojpuri folk music.

== Early life ==
Bharti was born on 20 November 1936 in Nonaur village in Bhojpur district of present-day Bihar. The Padma Awards citation records that he began singing in local kirtan (devotional) groups in childhood and received traditional training from Shatrunjay Prasad Singh, also known as Lalan Ji. Hindi-language coverage notes that he grew up in a rural household in Bhojpur district and started performing in village gatherings at a young age.

== Career ==
Bharti began his public career in the Bhojpuri-speaking areas of Bihar, performing in village kirtan mandalis and local cultural events. Over several decades he developed a repertoire that included devotional, seasonal and ceremonial songs linked to rural life and festivals in the region.

Reports on his Padma Shri state that his performances expanded from village stages to district and state cultural programmes, and later to events for Bhojpuri-speaking communities outside India. Coverage following the Padma announcement refers to his long career and to his being addressed as "Guruji" by students and listeners.

== Musical style ==
The Padma Awards citation credits Bharti with work on a range of Bhojpuri folk genres, including devotional songs, seasonal compositions, goddess songs and other village-based forms, and records that he has taught these traditions to many students. Navbharat Times and ABP Live describe him as an exponent of traditional Bhojpuri folk who has favoured devotional and classical-leaning styles over more commercial trends in Bhojpuri popular music.

== Association with All India Radio Patna ==
The Padma Awards citation records that Bharti has been associated with All India Radio, Patna, since 1962 and notes that he became a top-grade artist for AIR. Newspaper reports on his Padma Shri mention his radio work as part of the context for the honour.

== Awards and honours ==
=== Padma Shri ===
In 2026 Bharti was awarded the Padma Shri in the field of art (music). The official citation describes him as a Bhojpuri folk singer, composer and lyricist whose work has been associated with the preservation and dissemination of folk music traditions from Bihar and notes his decades-long association with All India Radio Patna. National and regional media in English and Hindi reported his inclusion among the Padma Shri recipients for that year. A press release from the Press Information Bureau lists him among the Padma awardees in the art category.

=== Sangeet Natak Akademi Amrit Award ===
The Padma Awards citation records that Bharti received the Sangeet Natak Akademi Amrit Award for 2022–2023 from the Sangeet Natak Akademi as part of the Azadi Ka Amrit Mahotsav celebrations.

=== Bihar Lifetime Achievement Award ===
According to the Ministry of Home Affairs citation, Bharti received a lifetime achievement award on 24 September 2025 from the Department of Art and Culture, Government of Bihar, in recognition of his contribution to folk music. Media coverage of his Padma Shri often repeats this information with reference to the government citation.

=== Other honours ===
The Padma citation lists additional regional honours, including the Vindhyavasini Devi Award (2015–2016), the Purvi Purodha Mahendra Mishra Smriti Samman (2025) and the Bhikhari Thakur Lokrag Samman, among Bharti’s recognised accolades. These honours are primarily documented through the government citation and regional cultural reporting.

== Legacy ==
Hindustan Times and The Times of India identify Bharti as one of three figures from Bihar honoured with the Padma Shri in 2026 and note his role in sustaining Bhojpuri folk traditions over many years. ABP Live, TV9 Bharatvarsh and Navbharat Times describe him as a senior exponent of Bhojpuri folk music who has influenced younger artists through his performances and teaching. Articles following the Padma announcement discuss his career in the context of Bhojpuri folk music’s place in India’s cultural landscape.
