= Onkar Singh Pahwa =

Indian industrialist

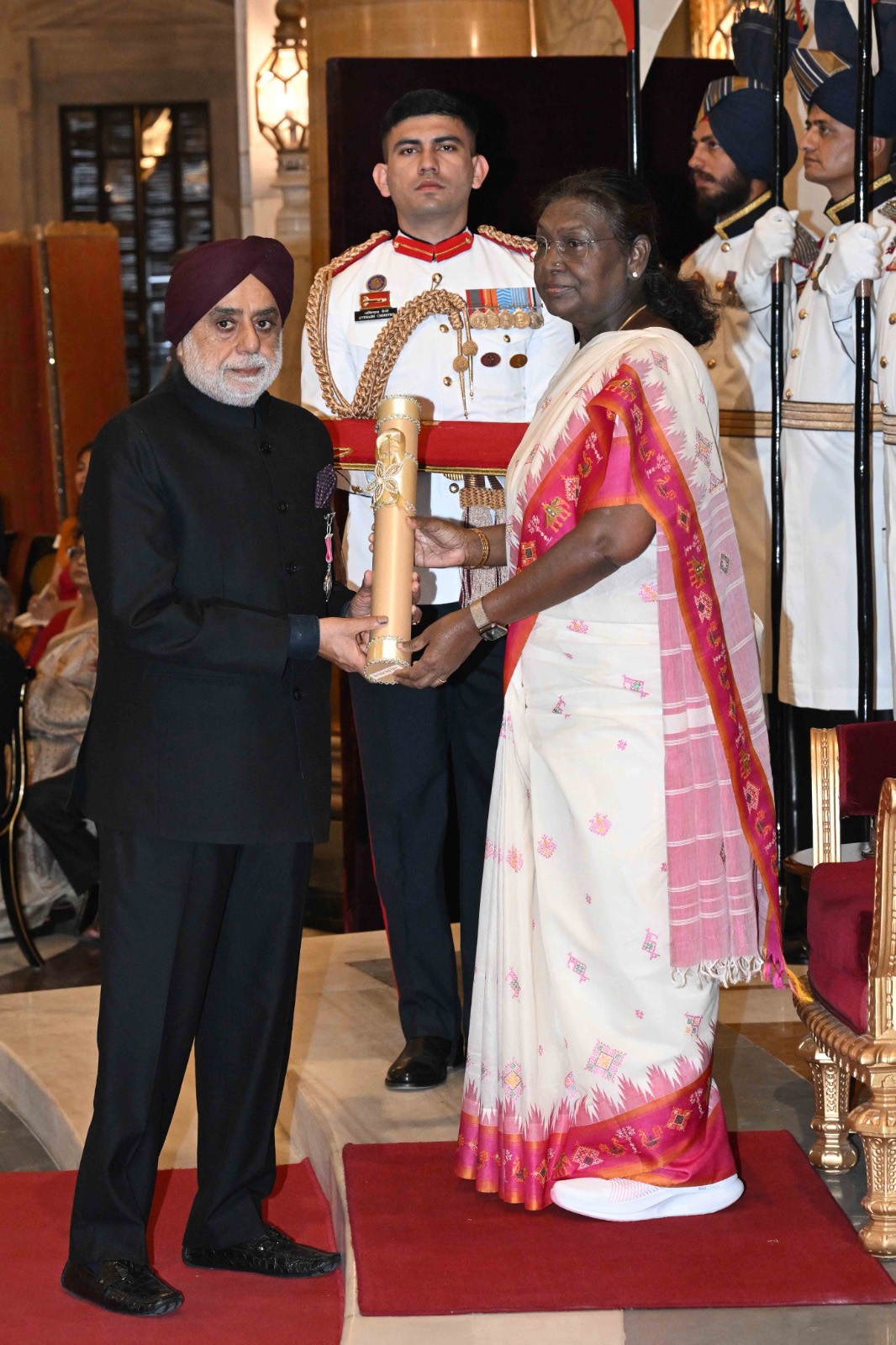
- Pahwa (left) receiving the Padma Shri in 2025
- Born: Ludhiana, Punjab, India
- Occupation: Industrialist
- Known for: Chairman and Managing Director of Avon Cycles; President of All India Cycle Manufacturers’ Association (AICMA)
- Awards: Padma Shri (2025)

Onkar Singh Pahwa is an Indian industrialist and the Chairman and Managing Director of Avon Cycles, a leading bicycle manufacturer headquartered in Ludhiana, Punjab. He is also the President of the All India Cycle Manufacturers’ Association (AICMA). In 2025, he was conferred with the Padma Shri, India's fourth-highest civilian honour, for his contributions to trade and industry.

== Career ==
Onkar Singh Pahwa has been associated with Avon Cycles for several decades. Under his leadership, the company expanded its operations globally and played a significant role in making affordable bicycles accessible in India and internationally.

Pahwa has advocated for the use of bicycles as an eco-friendly and healthy mode of transportation. During health awareness campaigns, he emphasized cycling's role in promoting physical well-being and reducing pollution.

== Positions ==
Pahwa serves as the President of the All India Cycle Manufacturers’ Association (AICMA), a representative body for the Indian bicycle industry.

== Awards ==
Onkar Singh Pahwa was awarded the Padma Shri in 2025 by the Government of India for his contributions to trade and industry.
