= Manoranjan Sahu =

Indian doctor

- Born: 1953 (age 72–73); West Bengal
- Known for: Academician, Ayurveda Doctor
- Awards: Padma Shri (2023)

Manoranjan Sahu is an academician, doctor, surgeon of Ayurveda and a former head of the Banaras Hindu University, BHU Ayurveda Faculty. He is known for reviving and promoting ancient surgical practices of Ayurveda, bringing a new identity to the Kshar Sutra (Alkaline Medicated Thread) method in surgery, and developing a novel treatment for fistula in Ano (IFTAK) technique with the same novel method. He was awarded Padma Shri for his contribution and was also the first to have received this honor in the field of Ayurvedic surgery.

== Early life ==
He was born on 2 March 1953 in the Midnapore district of West Bengal. In 1977. He completed his graduation degree from the State Ayurvedic College. He received a Master's degree (1982) and a doctorate (1986) from Banaras Hindu University, BHU. He joined as a reader in the Department of Surgery of the BHU Ayurveda Faculty in 1993.. He worked as a professor from 2003 until his retirement. He worked in the BHU for 34 years. He retired in 2018. While working at the BHU, he played a key role in building the country's first Kshar Sutra Centre, which was established in the BHU in the year 2013.

== Awards ==
- Padma Shri (2023)
- Honour by the Department of AYUSH, Ministry of Health and Family Welfare, Government of India (2008)
- Vaidya Sundarlal Joshi Memorial Award (2014)
