= Bimal Kumar Jain =

- Born: Munger, Bihar, India
- Occupation: Social worker
- Organization: Bharat Vikas Parishad
- Awards: Padma Shri

Bimal Kumar Jain is an Indian social activist from Bihar known for his work in disability welfare and organ donation awareness. He serves as general secretary of Bharat Vikas Viklang Nyas and Dadhichi Deh Daan Samiti. Jain is the recipient of the Government of India's Padma Shri.

== Early life and education ==
Bimal Kumar Jain was born and raised in Munger, Bihar, where he completed his early schooling. He later pursued higher studies in Patna. During his student years, he participated in the student movement active during the Emergency period in India (1975–1977).

== Awards and recognition ==
In 2020, Jain was awarded the Padma Shri for his contributions to humanitarian and social welfare activities.
