= S. G. Susheelamma =

Indian social worker and Padma Shri recipient

- Born: 24 May 1939 (age 87)
- Occupation: social worker
- Years active: 1975–present

S. G. Susheelamma (also known as Susheelamma; born 24 May 1939), affectionately called Amma is an Indian social worker and the founder-president of Sumangali Seva Ashrama founded in 1975 located in Bengaluru, Karnataka. She was awarded the Padma Shri in 2026 for her contributions to social work and community empowerment.

== Early life and education ==
Susheelamma was born on 24 May 1939 into a wealthy family in Chamarajpet, Bengaluru, Karnataka. She attended Vani Vilas Government School in Chamrajpet, Bengaluru. During her ninth-grade year, she participated in distributing textbooks to underprivileged students books that had been purchased from contributions by former students. This experience influenced her subsequent decision to pursue a career in social service.

== Career ==
Susheelamma began her career in social service before leaving formal employment to devote herself to the field full-time. In 1975, she established Sumangali Seva Ashrama ₹15 provided by an associate, Kanthamma, initially caring for three children. The organization initially operated from rented premises and relocated several times before establishing its current facilities in Cholanayakanahalli, Bengaluru.

The ashrama provides shelter, education, healthcare, and vocational training to marginalized communities. Its initiatives includes:

- Premananda Makkala Kuteera - a residential hostel for orphaned and abandoned girls.
- Basavananda Primary and Higher School, Sumangali Seva Ashrama Girl's High School and Kanmani Kindergarten - providing free education to children from economically disadvantaged families.
- Sowharda - a short-stay home for women in crisis.
- Punyakoti Vanaprasthashrama - a care facility for elderly women.
- A primary health center and a free polyclinic offering primary healthcare and mental health support.

By 2013, the ashrama was accommodating over 100 children and more than 50 destitute women, and its kitchen provided meals to over 800 people daily.

== Rural development and environmental initiatives ==
Susheelamma has implemented rural development and women's empowerment programmes across Karnataka, including adult literacy campaigns, self-help groups, Mahila Mandals, vocational training, microcredit initiatives and panchayat leadership development. She has collaborated with tribal communities such as the Iruligas and Kurubas on sustainable agriculture and livelihood projects in the Magadi region.

She initiated the Vrikshamahadasoha environmental movement, under which over forty lakh (40 million) saplings have been planted across Karnataka. She has also stated an aim to plant one crore (10 million) trees, viewing coconut saplings as providing long-term financial support for poor families.

Her organization has provided auto-rickshaw driving training to 30 women. One trainee reportedly earns ₹1,000 per day (approximately ₹30,000 per month) and has become a volunteer trainer.

== Awards and recognition ==
Susheelamma has received several national and state honours over her career.

- Karnataka State Award for Child Welfare.
- Smt. Yashodhara Dasappa Award.
- Ajantha Vishwa Nidhi Award.
- Samaja Seva Award.
- Basava Puraskar.
- Grama Jyothi Award.
- Rajiv Gandhi Shiromani Award.
- Rajyotsava Award - given by Government of Karnataka.
- Dr. Babasaheb Ambedkar National Award.
- National Award for Child Welfare.
- Dr. Durgabai Deshmukh Award.
- Basashree Award.
- Kittur Rani Chennamma Award.
- Lakshmi N. Menon Award for Literacy.
- Nadaprabhu Kempegowda Award.
- Devaraj Urs Award (2020-2021) - presented by Chief Minister Basavaraj Bommai.
- Honorary Doctorate - Karnataka State Akka Mahadevi Women's University, Vijayapura.
- Padma Shri (2026) - Government of India.

== Philosophy and legacy ==
Susheelamma, known as "Amma", has stated that her work is guided by Gandhian principles and the concept of commitment, or "sankalpa". Reflecting on her journey, she has described it as "miracle". She has said that the Padma Shri is not an endpoint but a reminder of the responsibility to continue serving.

She has encouraged young people to embrace social responsibility, stating, "we receive from society, and we must hive back. Everyone deserves a home, education, food and healthcare".
