= Badaplin War =

Indian professor and litterateur

- Occupation: Professor
- Awards: Padma Shri in 2022

Badaplin War is an Indian professor and a litterateur. In 2022, she was awarded the Padma Shri by the Indian Government for her contribution in literature and education.

== Early life and education ==
War did her PhD in Linguistics from the University of London, United Kingdom.

== Career ==
War joined the Department of Khasi as a lecturer in 1983 and got promoted to a Reader in 1996 and became a professor in 2001. She taught Linguistic Anthropology at North-Eastern Hill University from 1994 to 1996. She also taught General Linguistics, Morphology, Semantics there from 1996 to 1998. She also taught two courses at Shillong Regional Centre in 1995 and 2003. She is the founder president of Society for Khasi Studies and a member of the Khasi Author's Society. She has written nine books on Khasi language and linguistics.

== Awards ==
- Padma Shri in 2022
