= Nalini Parthasarathi =

Indian physician and social activist

- Born: Telangana, India
- Occupations: Paediatrician; Social activist Founder of the Haemophilia Society, Puducherry
- Known for: Helping hemophilia patients and contribution to medical education, healthcare and child welfare
- Awards: Padma Shri (2023)

Nalini Parthasarathi is an Indian physician, paediatrician and social activist from Telangana.

== Career ==
She was a former professor of pediatrics at the Jawaharlal Institute of Postgraduate Medical Education and Research (JIPMER) in Puducherry, India. She founded the Haemophilia Society, Puducherry, which has helped hemophilia patients in Puducherry and neighboring districts of Telangana areas for over 30 years. She has raised awareness of hemophilia and has worked for the rehabilitation of children with disabilities.

In 2023, she received the Padma Shri, India's third highest civilian honor for her work in treating hemophilia and improving the health of affected children. After ten years at JIPMER, Parthasarathi chose to retire to focus on hemophilia care. She established a Hemophilia Health Centre in Thattanchavady, supported by the state government and Indian Oil Corporation. This center currently assists about 300 patients with hemophilia.

== Awards ==
- She was awarded the Padma Shri in 2023 for her contributions to the field of medicine.
- She received the Shakuntala Shakti National Award from Tagore Government Arts and Science College in collaboration with the Divey Foundation, New Delhi in 2023.
- In 2023, she was honored with the ‘For the Sake of Honour’ award by the Rotary Club of Pondicherry Midtown.
