= Satyanarayanan Mundayoor =

Indian librarian and social worker

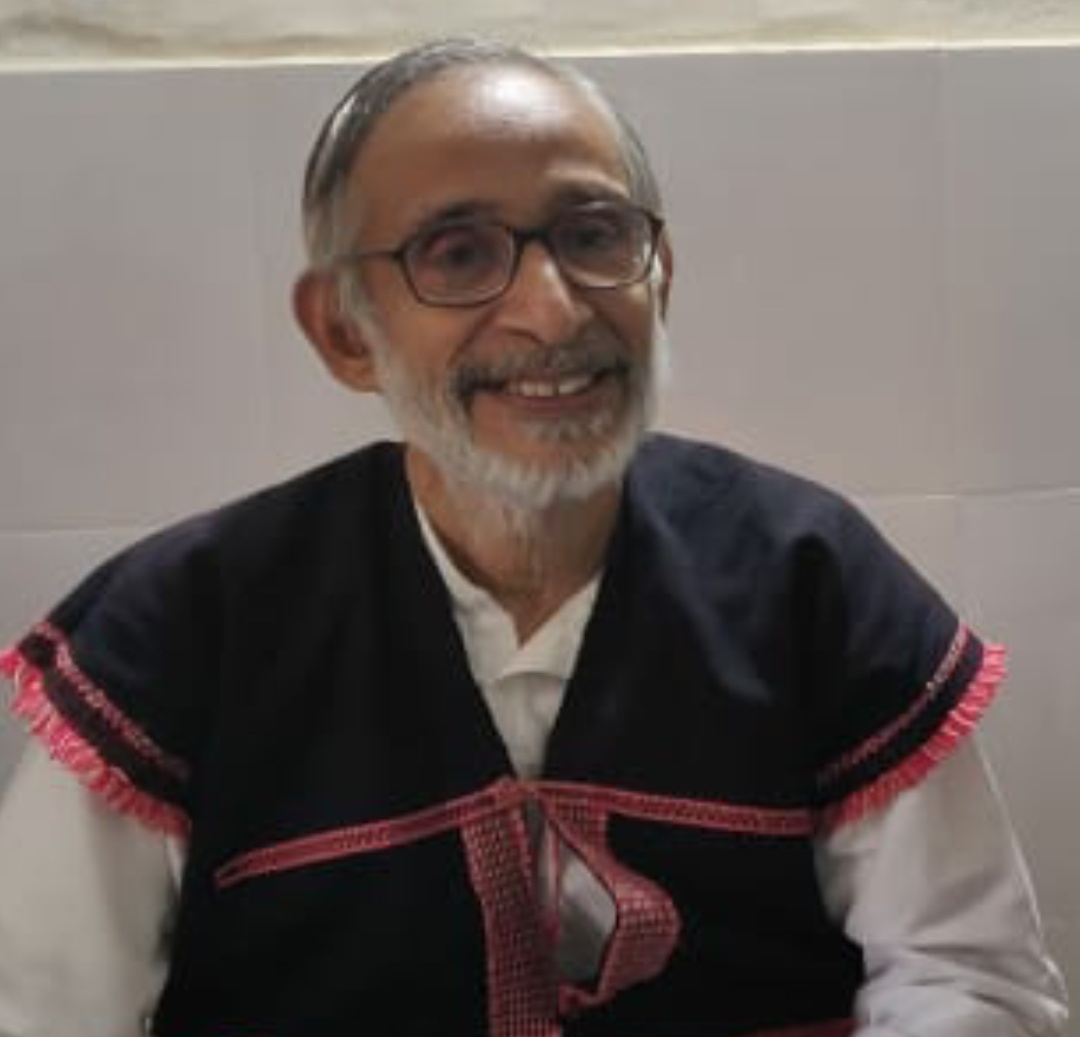
- Born: Satyanarayanan Mundayoor; Kerala
- Known for: Social Worker
- Awards: Padma Shri (2020)

Sathyanarayan Mundayoor also known as Uncle Moosa and Uncle Sir is a educationalist and social activist from India. Born in Kerala, Satyanarayanan has been working in Arunachal Pradesh for the last forty years. He received India's fourth highest civilian honor Padma Shri in 2020 for spreading education in Arunachal Pradesh.

== Career ==
Mundayoor was born at Arangodukara Mundayoor Mana in Thrissur district of Kerala, India. After his education he came to Mumbai for work. In 1979, he left his job as a Revenue Officer in Mumbai and came to Lohit in Arunachal Pradesh. Since then he has been promoting education and literacy in the state. While in Lohit he started spreading education as a social worker. Until 1996 he worked as an education officer in Vivekananda Kendra Vidyalaya. While working as education officer at Vivekananda Kendra Vidyalaya, he organized many book exhibitions. He founded the first community library in Etalin, at the top of the Dibang Valley. Within two years the Etalin Library split and grew into a library network in the Lohit district. in 2007, as part of the Lohit Youth Library Movement, in collaboration with the Association of Writers and Illustrators for Children (AWIC) and the Vivekananda Trust he started his first Bamboosa Library in the government town of Tezu. Under his leadership Thirteen libraries were opened in Wakro, Chongkham, Lathaw and Anjow. Each library has over 10,000 books ranging from comics to novels. He also started the Home Library movement to deliver books for children to homes. He has written a book for children in Malayalam about the folk culture of Arunachal Pradesh. In 2020 he has been awarded Padma Shri by the Indian government.

Uncle Moosa is the pen name he took while writing a column in a local newspaper.

== Awards and honours ==
- Arunachal Governor’s Silver Medal for meritorious services to the youth
- He was featured in the ‘Amazing Indians’ series in the Times Now TV in 2012
- He was included in the ‘Civil Society Hall of Fame’ in 2016
- In 2020, he received India's fourth highest civilian honor Padma Shri
- In 2022, he received 25th Mahaveer Awards presented by Bhagwan Mahaveer Foundation, Chennai.
