= Haricharan Saikia =

Indian Sattriya dancer and Padma Shri awardee

- Born: c. 1929/1930; Assam, India
- Occupation: Sattriya dance exponent
- Known for: Promotion and preservation of Sattriya dance
- Awards: Padma Shri (2026); Sangeet Natak Akademi Award (2011)

Haricharan Saikia is an Indian Sattriya dance exponent from Assam. He was conferred the Padma Shri in 2026, India’s fourth-highest civilian award, in recognition of his lifelong contribution to the preservation, practice and promotion of Sattriya, a classical dance form of Assam.

== Early life and training ==
Saikia was raised at the Old Kamalabari Satra in Majuli, where he began learning Sattriya dance under the guidance of renowned guru Maniram Dutta Borbayan during his childhood.

== Career ==
Saikia devoted his life to the practice, promotion, and teaching of Sattriya dance. He has performed widely at cultural programmes in Assam and other parts of India. During his career, he also performed before India’s first prime minister, Jawaharlal Nehru, at a cultural event in New Delhi. In 2011, he was honoured with the Sangeet Natak Akademi Award for his artistic mastery and sustained service to Indian classical dance.

Despite his advanced age, Saikia continued to teach Sattriya at his own institution and remained actively engaged in mentoring younger practitioners. His recognition with the Padma Shri highlights his lifelong contribution to preserving Assam’s cultural heritage.

== Awards and recognition ==
- Sangeet Natak Akademi Award (2011)
- Padma Shri (2026)
