= Thiruvengadam Veeraraghavan =

Indian doctor

Thiruvengadam Veeraraghava was an Indian doctor. He was also known as the “two rupees doctor”. In 2021 he received Padma Shri, fourth highest civilian award for his service to the society as a medical doctor. He served the poor communities of Sri Kalyanapuram and Erukkancherry in North Chennai.

== Life ==
He was born to Veeraraghavan, a farmer, and Radhabai. He completed his schooling from Thyagaraya School and medicine from Government Stanley Medical College. His wife Saraswathi worked as a railway officer and retired. He used to treat people free of cost or collect only a nominal fee of Rs.2, Rs.5 or 50 from those who can afford to pay. His private practice was selfless service to society and his job as an industrial medical officer in a corporate hospital was his source of regular income. He died on August 15, 2020.

He died on 16 August 2020, at the age of 70.
