= Kamalakar Tripathi =

Indian physician

Kamlakar Tripathi
- Occupation: Physician
- Known for: Giving free consultation to patients
- Awards: Padma Shri

Kamlakar Tripathi is an Indian physician and Former Professor in the Department of Medicine, BHU Institute of Medical Sciences. He has been the Head of Nephrology Department. He has served as the Chairman of the Department of General Medicine, BHU from 1998 to 2001 and the President of the Indian Hypertension Society from 2008 to 2009. He also held the responsibility of Dean in-charge of the BHU Institute.

He was also the President of UP Diabetes Association from 2009 to 2011. Tripathi has received 2 international and 15 national awards.

The Government of India awarded him the fourth highest civilian honor of the Padma Shri, in 2022, for his contributions in the field of medicine.

He has been serving patients for free for the past several years. He provides free consultation to 100 to 150 patients every day.

== Personal life ==
He currently resides in Ravindrapuri Extension of Varanasi.
