= Narayan Joshi Karayal =

Gujarati and Kutchi author

Narayan Joshi 'Karayal' is a Gujarati and Kutchi language author and story writer.

== Works ==
Joshi founded Kachchhi Sahitya Kala Sangh in 1999 which teaches the basics of Kutchi to people who are not acquainted with it. He has written Kachchhi Pathavali in two parts which has been standardised by Gujarat Council of Educational Research and Training to learn Kutchi.

== Recognition ==
Joshi was awarded the Padma Shri, the fourth highest civilian award of India, for his services in the field of literature and education in 2020.
