= Batakrushna Sahoo =

Indian farmer

Batakrushna Sahu
- Occupation: Farmer
- Awards: Padma Shri (2020)

Batakrushna Sahu is an Indian farmer from Odisha. He was conferred with the Padma Shri in 2020 for his contribution in animal husbandry.

== Biography ==
A farmer from Sarkana village of Khordha district, Sahoo started pisciculture in 1986. He trained many farmers in spawn production through traditional breeding methods. He did not get any financial help from the government. He also trained students from several colleges in Odisha.

== Awards ==
Sahoo was conferred with the Padma Shri in 2020 for his contribution in animal husbandry.
