= Marachi Subburaman =

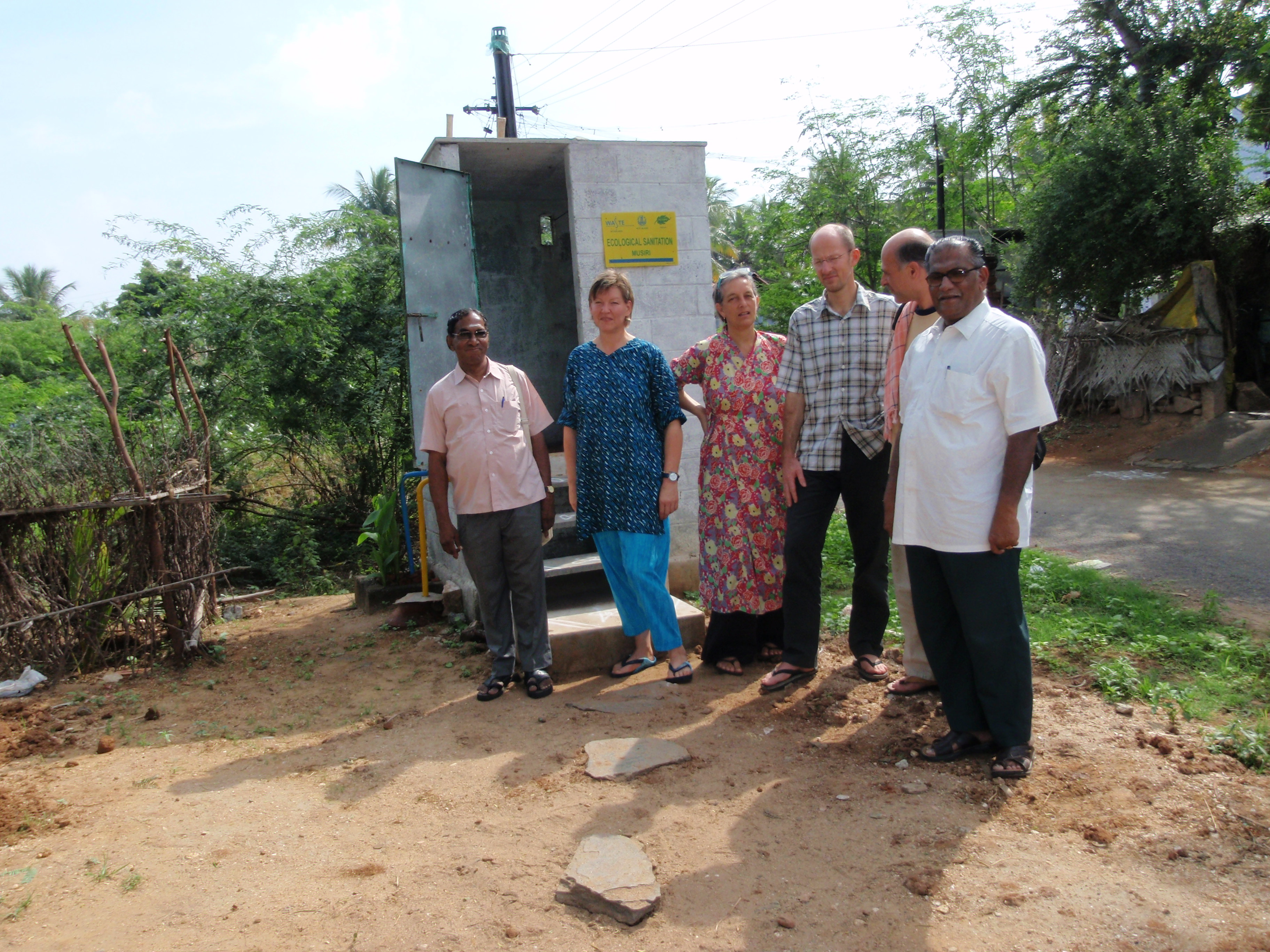
- Born: Inungur, Kulithalai
- Education: BSc Chemistry; BEd.
- Alma mater: Periyar E.V.R. College
- Occupation: Social worker
- Years active: 1976–present
- Organization: SCOPE
- Known for: Improving sanitation in rural India
- Awards: Padma Shri
- Website: www.scopetrichy.com

Marachi Subburaman is an Indian social worker who is rendering services related to eco-friendly sanitation and water conservation for rural areas in India through a Non-governmental organization viz Society for Community Organisation and People’s Education (SCOPE) based in Trichy, Tamil Nadu founded and run by him. His contribution to the field of sanitation was recognized nationally and towards the social service, and was awarded the Padma Shri, the fourth-highest civilian award in the Republic of India, in 2021.

== Early life and education ==
Subburaman was born in Inungur, Kulithalai. He was the first graduate from his village. After completing his graduation he started working with Village Reconstruction Organization in 1976 under the guidance of Father Michael Windey who inspired Subburaman to render his service in the rural areas.

== Work ==
In 1986 Subburaman founded an NGO, Society for Community Organisation and Peoples Education (SCOPE), to render his service to the rural areas in India by providing better sanitation. Subburaman through his NGO in association with UNICEF built more than 20000 EcoSan toilets throughout the country.
