= Sujit Chattopadhyay =

Indian teacher

- Born: Burdwan, West Bengal, India
- Occupation: Indian teacher
- Awards: Padma Shri

Sujit Chattopadhyay is an Indian teacher. He is fondly known as Two Rupees Teacher. In 2021, he has been awarded Padma Shri by the Indian Government for his contribution in education.

== Early life ==
Chattopadhyay is from Burdwan.

== Career ==
Chattopadhyay is a former president of Ramnagar Uccha Madhyamik Vidyalaya. He taught for 40 years before his retirement. He gives private tuition to poor students. He teaches students of class nine, ten, eleven, twelve. The name of his school is Sadai Fakirer Pathshala.

After retiring in 2004 at the age of 60, he was concerned about how he would spend his days in retirement. However, teaching soon became his regular activity. At the coaching center located in a vacant lot nearby Chattopadhyay's Ramnagar residence, an average of 300 students study every day.

Sadai Fakirer Pathshala was established after three students traveled 20 kilometers to the house of a retired instructor. The school now has an enrollment of more than 350 children and includes an attendance-keeping system and periodic PTA meetings.

== Awards ==
- Padma Shri in 2021
