= Shiv Datt Nirmohi =

Indian writer

Shiv Datt Nirmohi (Padma Shree)
- Born: 19 April 1937 (age 88); Painthal, Reasi District
- Occupation: Writer
- Awards: Padma Shri

Shiv Dutt Upadhyaye (born 19 April 1937), known by his pen name Shiv Datt Nirmohi, is an Indian Dogra writer. He was awarded Padma Shri in literature and education in 2020. His work was primarily focused on documenting Jammu's history, culture and heritage.
