= Dilshad Hussain =

Indian artisan and craftsman

Dilshad Hussain is an Indian artisan and craftsman from Uttar Pradesh. He won the Padma Shri in 2023. In August 2022, during the G-7 Summit, Narendra Modi gifted an Urn made by Hussain to the Chancellor of Germany.

== Early life ==
Dilshad Hussain was born in Moradabad and lives at Kaith Wali Masjid Gali with his sons and daughters-in-law. Two of his daughters-in-law have won State Awards by the hands of the Governor of Uttar Pradesh.
