= Dharma Narayan Barma =

Indian Sanskrit teacher

- Born: November 10, 1935 (age 90)
- Education: Calcutta University

Dharma Narayan Barma (born 10 November 1935) is an Indian Sanskrit teacher from Cooch Behar, West Bengal. He is known for his work in promoting Kamtapur language. For his contribution to the Arts and Literature, he was given India's fourth-highest civilian Padma Shri award in 2021.

== Early life ==
Barma was born in 1935 in, He did his master's degree from Calcutta University in Sanskrit in 1959. Then started working as teacher at Metropolitan Higher Secondary School, Calcutta. after that he returned to Cooch Behar, where he worked at Nripendra Narayan Memorial High School until he retired.

== Awards ==
Padma Shri from Government of India in 2021.
