= Leela Joshi =

Gynecologist and social worker

- Born: Rajasthan
- Citizenship: Indian
- Occupation: Gynaecologist
- Awards: Padma Shri (2020)

Leela Joshi is an Indian gynaecologist and social worker known for her work for the welfare of tribal women and teenage girls suffering from Anemia in Ratlam district. She has been nicknamed Mother Teresa of Madhya Pradesh and received Padma Shri in 2020.

== Career ==
Joshi began her career as an assistant surgeon with Indian Railways in Kota, Rajasthan. She retired from the railways in 1997 from the position of Chief Medical Director. After retirement, she moved to Ratlam district in Madhya Pradesh where she started providing free healthcare services to tribal women and children.

She was listed among the top 100 influential women in the country in a survey carried out by the Dept of Women and Child Development and in 2020, she was awarded the Padma Shri India's fourth highest civilian award for her work amongst Tribals in Madhya Pradesh.
