= Narayan Vyas =

Indian archaeologist

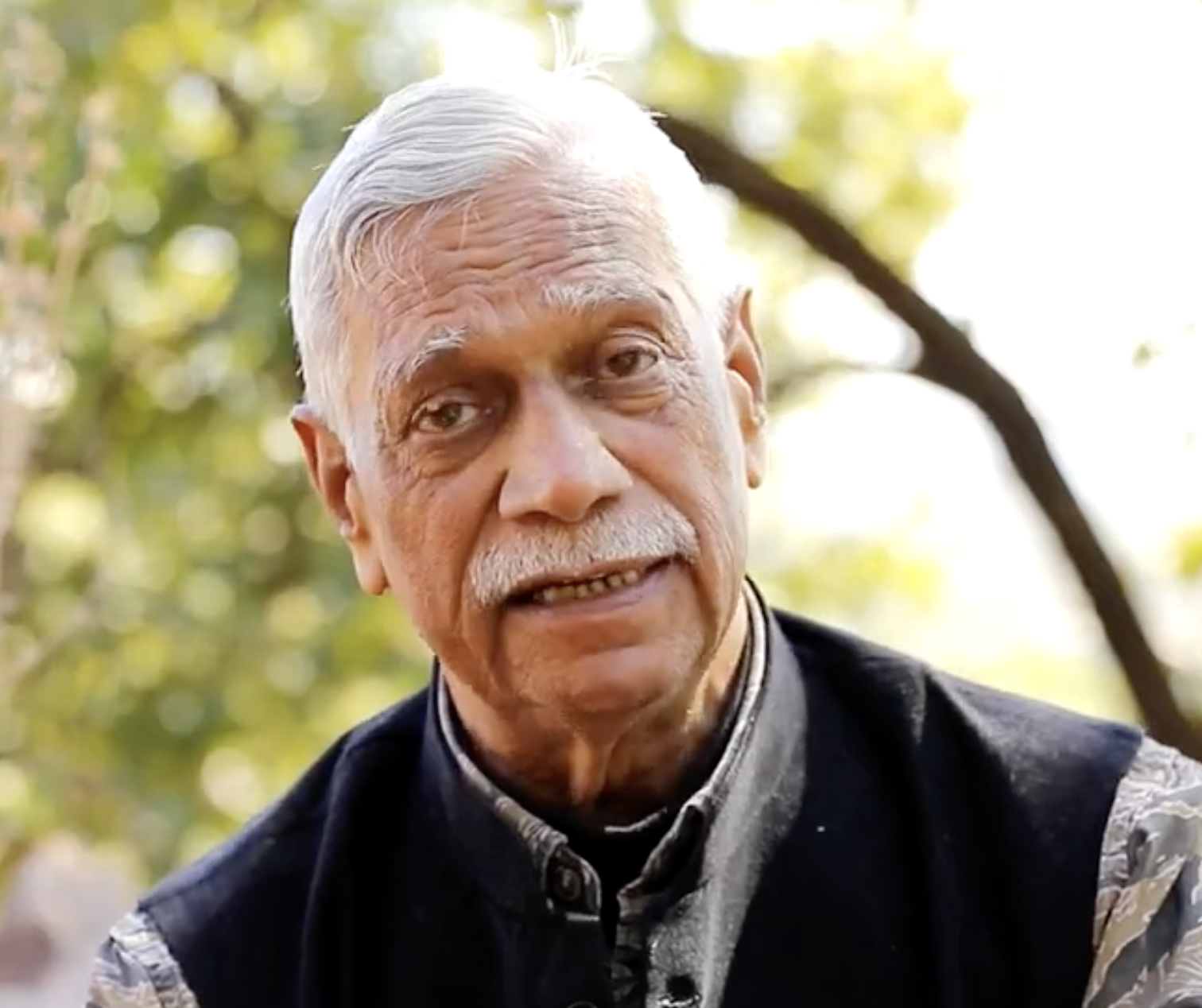
- Vyas in 2024
- Born: January 5, 1949 (age 77)
- Citizenship: Indian
- Occupation: Archaeologist
- Known for: Extensive work in prehistoric and ancient Indian history, particularly in Madhya Pradesh
- Awards: Padma Shri (2026)

Narayan Vyas (born 5 January 1949) is an Indian archaeologist known for his extensive work in the field of prehistoric and ancient Indian history, particularly in the state of Madhya Pradesh. In 2026, he was awarded the Padma Shri, India's fourth-highest civilian award, in recognition of his contributions to the field of archaeology.

== Early life and education ==
Vyas developed an interest in archaeology during his student years. He was significantly influenced by the renowned archaeologist V. S. Wakankar, with whom he shared a close professional relationship. Vyas was part of several explorations led by Wakankar, including the discovery and study of the Bhimbetka rock shelters.

== Career ==
Vyas served in the Archaeological Survey of India (ASI) for several decades, retiring as a Superintending Archaeologist. During his tenure, he conducted numerous excavations and explorations across Madhya Pradesh. He has been described as the "Grand Old Man of Archaeology" in the region due to his vast knowledge of the local terrain and historical sites.

His work primarily focused on:

- Rock art: Vyas has spent significant time documenting and preserving prehistoric rock paintings, particularly those in the Vindhya Range.
- Temple restoration: He oversaw the conservation and restoration of several ancient temples and monuments under the jurisdiction of the ASI.
- Documentation: He has been involved in the detailed cataloging of artifacts and historical remains found in Central India.

Even after his retirement, Vyas continues to be active in the field, providing guidance to young archaeologists and participating in heritage awareness programs.

== Significant discoveries and views ==
Vyas has spoken extensively about the discovery of Bhimbetka, noting that V. S. Wakankar first spotted the rock formations from the Obaidullaganj railway station before trekking to the site for further investigation. He has also emphasized the need for better protection of unprotected archaeological sites that are often subject to encroachment or natural decay.

== Awards ==
- Padma Shri (2026)
