= Kamali Soren =

Indian social worker

- Born: 1971 (age 53–54); Kotalhati, Malda District, West Bengal, India
- Occupation: Social worker
- Known for: Social work, preventing child marriage
- Awards: Padma Shri (2021)

Kamali Soren (born 1971), also known as Guru Maa, is an Indian social worker from Malda district, West Bengal, recognized for her efforts in social welfare and preventing child marriage. She is associated with the RSS-backed All India Vanavasi Kalyan Ashram in Gazole, Malda.

== Early life ==
Kamali Soren was born in 1971 in Kotalhati village, Malda district, West Bengal. After her husband's death, she began living in a tribal camp in Kotalhati and took up social work, focusing on the tribal communities in the region.

== Career ==
Soren has worked with the All India Vanavasi Kalyan Ashram, a tribal organization affiliated with the RSS, in Gazole, Malda. She has been involved in encouraging tribal people, particularly Christians and Muslims, to return to Hinduism, which has sparked controversy. In November 2021, Soren intervened to stop a child marriage in Habibpur, Malda, ensuring a 14-year-old girl could continue her education by promising to cover her expenses.

== Awards ==
In 2021, Soren was awarded the Padma Shri, India's fourth-highest civilian honor, for her contributions to social work. Her selection drew criticism from some political groups due to her association with the RSS and allegations of religious conversions.
