= Chaitram Deochand Pawar =

Indian social worker

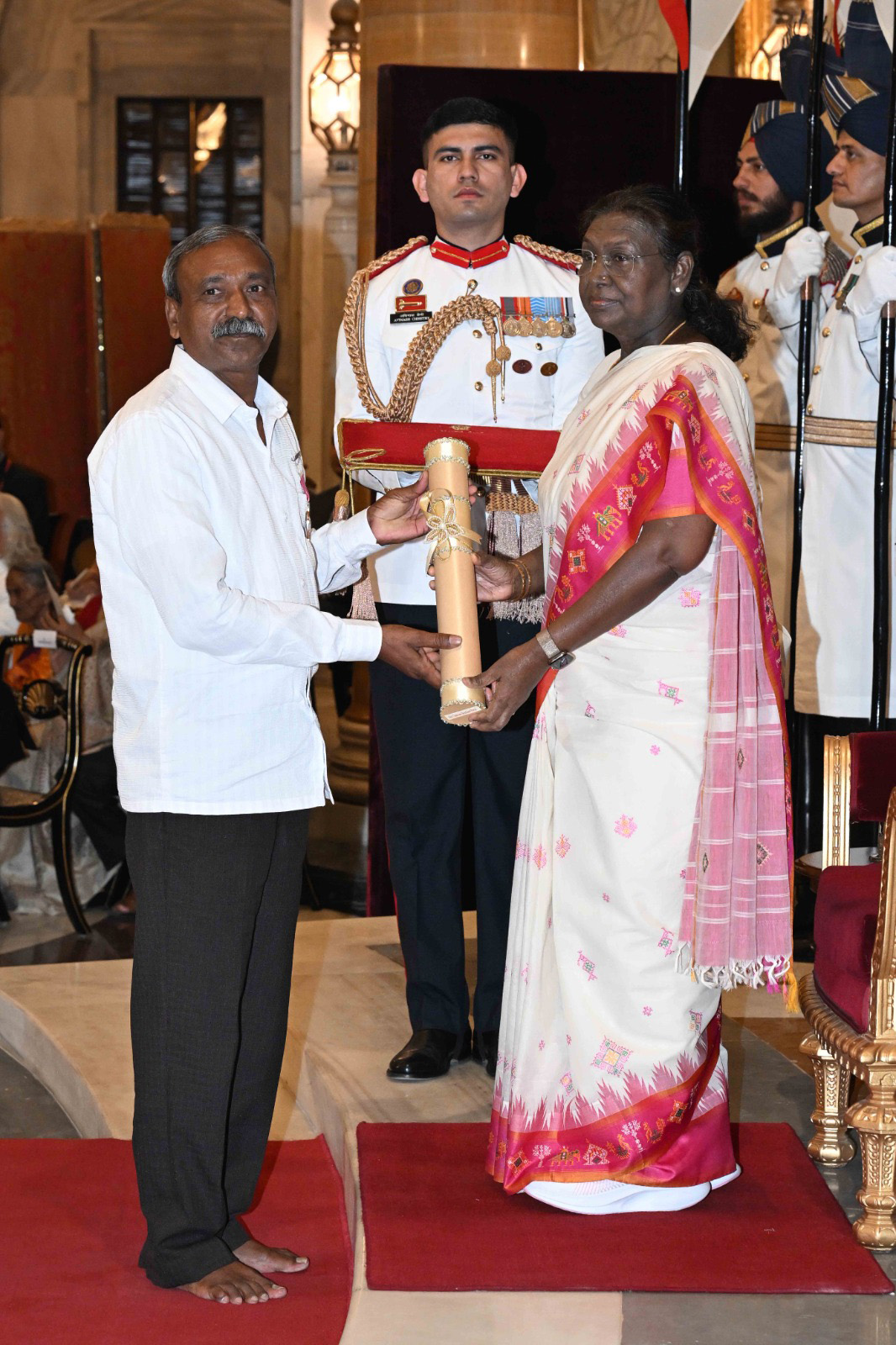
The President of India, Smt Droupadi Murmu presenting the Padma Shri Award to Shri Chaitram Deochand Pawar at the Civil Investiture Ceremony-I at Rashtrapati Bhavan, in New Delhi on April 28, 2025.

Chaitram Deochand Pawar, also known as Chaitram Pawar, is an Indian social worker from Maharashtra, India. He was awarded the Padma Shri, the fourth-highest civilian award of India, in 2025 in the field of social work for his efforts in afforestation, water conservation, and wildlife conservation. He is the president of Devgiri Kalyan Ashram, Dhule. He is from the Konkani tribe.

Pawar has led water and forest conservation efforts in the Bharipada village of Maharashtra’s Dhule district, reportedly leading to construction of over 500 check dams and trenches, and improving the groundwater levels and irrigation in the area. His efforts have also contributed to biodiversity conservation providing shelter to 8 endangered animal species and 48 bird species, and preserving 435 species of trees, creepers, and shrubs.

He was felicitated with Sant Eshwer Vishisht Sewa Samman in 2019 from the Sant Eshwer foundation.
