= Inderjit Singh Sidhu =

Indian social worker

- Born: India
- Occupation: Social Worker
- Awards: Padma Shri

Inderjit Singh Sidhu is a former Indian police officer and social worker. He is a retired Deputy Inspector General (DIG) of Police and known for personally cleaning public spaces in Chandigarh as part of a long running civic cleanliness effort.

== Social work ==
Sidhu’s daily street cleaning activities gained national attention for promoting citizen responsibility and public hygiene.

In 2026, the Government of India announced him as a recipient of the Padma Shri for his contribution to social service.

He was included in the Republic Day honours list under the category recognising unsung grassroots contributors. National media outlets have described his work as an example of sustained individual civic action. His recognition brought renewed public discussion on community-led cleanliness initiatives in India.

== Awards ==
- Padma Shri (announced 2026) for social service
