= Bhimavva Doddabalappa Shillekyathara =

Indian puppeteer artist

- Born: 1929 (age 96–97); Moranala, Koppal district, Karnataka, India
- Occupation: Puppeteer
- Years active: 1950s–present
- Known for: Togalu Gombeyaata (shadow puppetry)
- Notable work: Preservation and performance of Togalu Gombeyaata
- Awards: Padma Shri

Bhimavva Doddabalappa Shillekyathara (Born:1929) is a puppeteer from the Koppal district in Karnataka. She is 96 years old. She is performing Togalu Gombeyaata for the last seven decades. Togalu Gombeyaata is a traditional art form which is used for storytelling. This kind of puppetry often narrates stories from the epics Ramayana and Mahabharata. She has been honored with India's fourth highest civilian award Padma shri from union government of India in the year 2025.

== Early life and career ==
Shillekyathara is a native of Moranala village in Koppal district of Karnataka state. Shillekyathara belongs to a family that has been custodians of Togalu Gombeyaata for over a century. She has also focused on training the younger generation to continue the tradition.
