= Sathyanarayana Beleri =

Padmashri award winning Indian farmer and paddy conservationist

- Born: Nettanige, Bellur Grama Panchayat, Kasaragod district, Kerala, India
- Occupations: Farmer; paddy conservator
- Known for: Maintaining a gene pool of 650+ traditional rice varieties; on-farm conservation of paddy diversity
- Awards: Plant Genome Savior Farmer Reward (2018–19); Padma Shri (2024)

Sathyanarayana Beleri is a farmer and also a paddy conservator of Nettanige village in Bellur Gramapanchayath in Kasaragod district in Kerala. After completing his secondary education, he took up farming and has since developed a collection of more than 650 traditional rice varieties, which he maintains through cultivation and preservation methods developed on his farm.

In recognition of his contribution to the conservation of agricultural biodiversity, the Protection of Plant Varieties and Farmers' Rights Authority, under the Ministry of Agriculture and Farmers Welfare, Government of India, awarded him the Plant Genome Savior Farmer Reward for 2018–19. In 2024, he received the Padma Shri, one of India’s highest civilian honours, for his work in the field of agriculture.

The rice varieties preserved by Beleri include Chitteni, Akrikaaya, Narikela, Suggi kayame, Vellatuven, Gandhasaale, Jeerige Sanna, Ghangadale, Kumkumsaale, Kalame, Kottambarasaale, Karigajavile, Raajamudi, Jugal Kagga, Karijeddu, Parambu Ucchan, Mysooru mallige.
