= M. K. Kunjol =

Indian social worker

- Born: May 8, 1937 (age 88); Kottappadi, Kerala, India
- Occupation: Social worker
- Awards: Padma Shri (2020) for Social work Ambedkar Award

M. K. Kunjol is Indian social worker from Kerala who was awarded Padma Shri Award by President of India for social service in 2020. He staged protests demanding the transfer of a police officer for 382 days in the 1970s. He was also honored with the Ambedkar Award in 2001.
