= Sandra Desa Souza =

Indian surgeon

Dr Sandra Desa Souza is an ENT Head, Neck and Cochlea Implant Surgeon. She is the first Indian Fellow of the American Otological Society. She was awarded the Padma Shri India's fourth-highest civilian award in 2020. She is the first woman surgeon in the world to pioneer the Cochlear implant surgery in India and Asia in 1987. Dr. Souza was one of the first ENT surgeons in the country to perform artificial ear operations, is credited to have given the gift of hearing to thousands of patients.
