= Balan Putheri =

India author

Balan Pootheri is a visually challenged author from India. He authored more than 211 books on different subjects. He was given the Padma Shri Award, the fourth-highest civilian award in India in 2021.

== Life ==
Pootheri is from Karipur, Kerala, India. He published his first book in 1983, and his 50th book, Guruvayoor Ekadashi, in 1997. He authored 211 books and most of them were about Hindu mythology.

His wife, Shanta, who was battling cancer, died on the day he reached Rashtrapati Bhavan to receive the award.
