= Mahabir Singh Guddu =

- Born: 10 October 1961 (age 64); Jind, Haryana
- Occupations: Folk artist, singer, actor

Mahabir Singh Guddu (born 10 October 1961) is an Indian folk artist, singer, and actor from Haryana. He is known for his contributions to Haryanvi folk music and dance. In 2024, he was awarded the Padma Shri, India's fourth-highest civilian honour, for his contributions to the arts.

His work includes the performance and preservation of traditional Haryanvi dances.

Guddu has performed at Surajkund Mela.
