= Khader Vali =

Indian nutritionist

Khader Valli
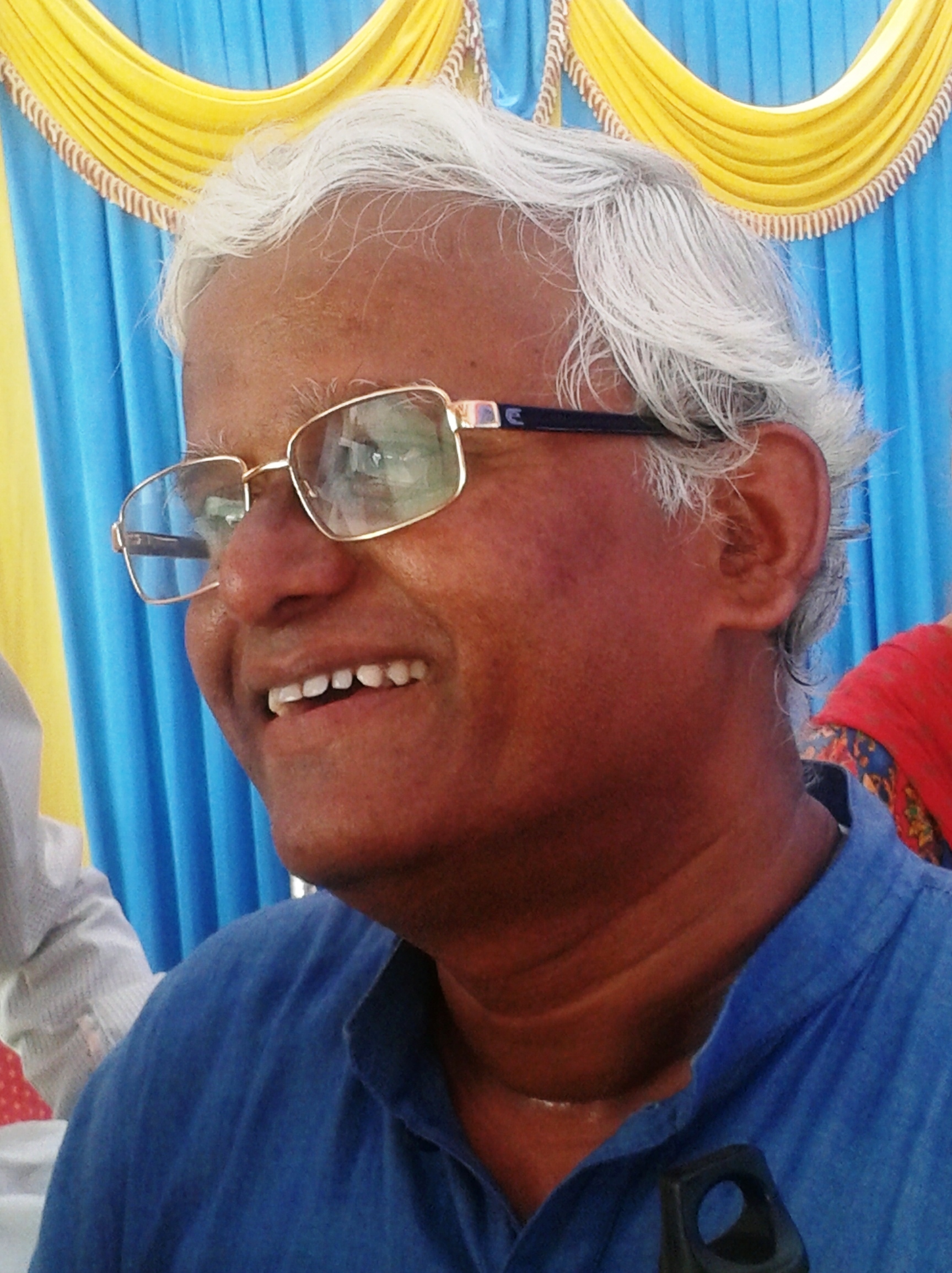
- Born: Kadapa district, Andhra Pradesh
- Known for: Advocating the consumption of millets
- Website: https://healthymillets.in

Khader Valli residing in Mysore is a food and nutrition specialist, who advocates consumption of millets.

== Early life and education ==
Born in Kadapa district of Andhra Pradesh, he completed MSc in Regional Institute of Education, Mysore and PhD in steroids at the Indian Institute of Science, Bangalore and he became a Postdoctoral Fellow in Environmental science at Beaverton, Oregon, US.

== Career ==
Khader Vali worked in the US as a scientist and returned to India in 1997. He advocates eating millets in place of rice and wheat, and been studying millets for 20 years. He also works on soil fertility and agricultural practices.

== Recognition ==
- Padma Shri by the President of India on 5 April 2023.
