= Coomi Nariman Wadia =

Indian music conductor

- Born: 6 August 1933 (age 93)
- Awards: Padma Shri

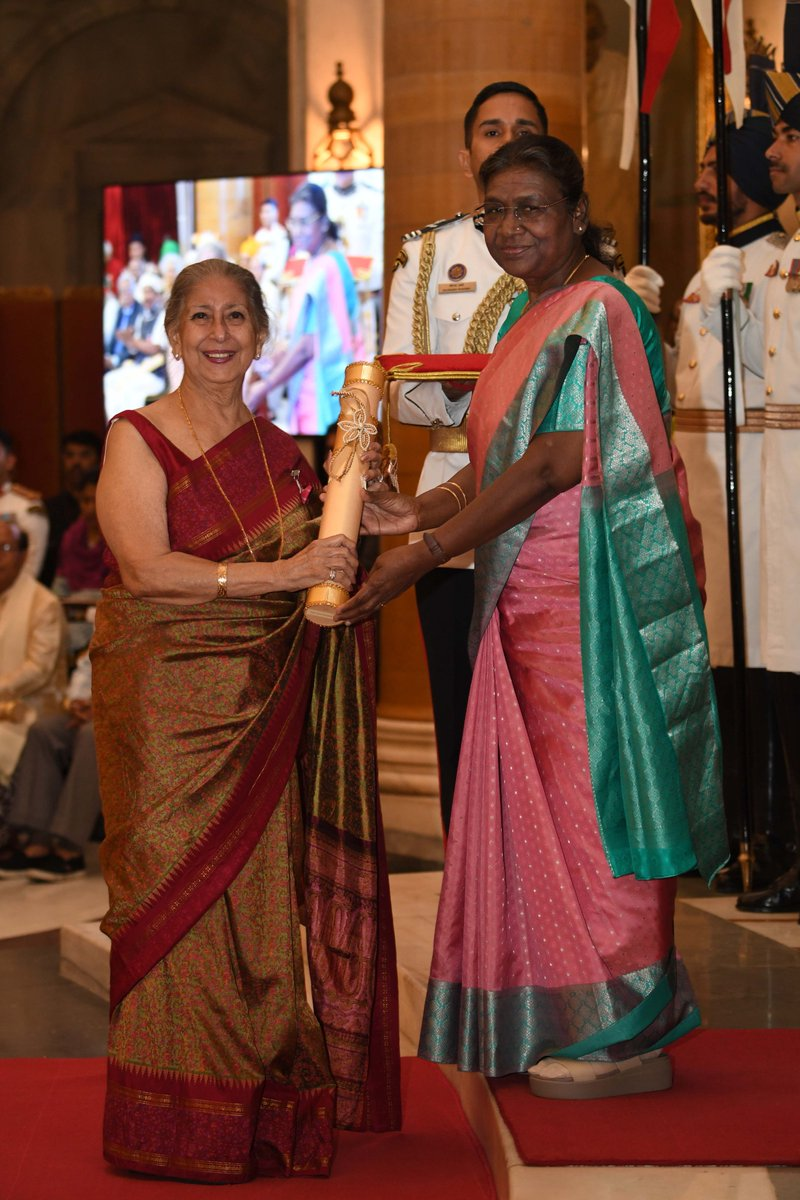
Coomi Nariman Wadia receives the Padma Shri award from President Droupadi Murmu

Coomi Nariman Wadia (born 6 August 1933) is an Indian music conductor. In 2024, she was honored with the Padma Shri, a prestigious civilian award presented by the Government of India, in recognition of her contributions to the field of art.

== Biography ==
After studying at the Sir J. J. School of Art, she obtained two diplomas from Trinity College of Music.

Wadia joined the Paranjoti Academy Chorus, which was formed by Victor Paranjoti, as a soprano. She would fill in for the role of conductor when Paranjoti was unavailable. Upon Paranjoti's death in 1964, she became the conductor.
