= S Damodaran (social worker) =

Indian social worker

S Damodaran (born 12 March 1962) is the founder of the NGO Gramalaya, based in Tiruchirappalli. Gramalaya, established in 1987, was initially focused on the economic improvement of rural people. Later, realizing that the more urgent and immediate concern is the unavailability of clean drinking water and toilet facilities, the NGO shifted their focus to water and sanitation. Gramalaya aims to eradicate open defecation by providing eco-friendly toilets. Gramalaya is now an important resource center of the Ministry of Jalshakti, Govt. of India. The NGO has been functioning with the support of Government, donors and corporate groups under CSR initiatives. It was Gramalaya's efforts that helped transform the Thandavampatti village in Tiruchy into the first open-defecation free village in India in 2003.

Damodaran secured a BA degree in Corporate Secretaryship in 1984, MCom degree in 1986 and MBA in Project Management in 2011.

== Recognition: Padma Shri ==
- In the year 2022, Govt of India conferred the Padma Shri award, the fourth highest civilian award in the Padma series of awards, on S Damodaran for his distinguished service in the field of social work. The award is in recognition of his service as a "Social Worker who has dedicated his life to sanitation promotion in villages and slums in South India".
