= Prakash Kaur (social worker) =

India social worker

- Born: Jalandhar, Punjab, India
- Occupation: Social Worker
- Awards: Padma Shri

Bibi Prakash Kaur is a social worker from Jalandhar, India. She received the Padma Shri for her social service towards abandoned female children in Punjab.

She was an abandoned girl herself, left as a baby on the streets, and was raised at Nari Niketan. She left Nari Niketan in 1993 to start her own home to provide shelter for the abandoned girls. She started with eight girls but gradually the number of abandoned girls increased. She encourages parents not to abandon their children on the street, but to bring them to her instead.

The Unique Home, her shelter for abandoned children, is equipped with a baby hatch.

She was also given the Real Heroes Award from Reliance Industries.

== Awards ==
- Padma Shri
- International Women's Day Award (awarded by Raghav Chadda, member of Rajya Sabha)
