= Yazdi Italia =

Indian doctor and public health scientist

Yazdi Maneksha Italia
- Born: Gujarat, India
- Occupations: Doctor, Public Health Scientist
- Known for: Tribal healthcare, Sickle cell anemia control program
- Awards: Padma Shri (2024); Prime Minister's Award for Excellence in Public Administration (2011); Chief Minister’s Award, Government of Gujarat (2023); NDTV Health Leader of the Year (2023)

Yazdi Maneksha Italia is an Indian doctor and public health scientist known for his contributions to tribal healthcare and sickle cell anemia control in Gujarat. He served as the Director of the sickle cell anemia control program of the Government of Gujarat, and was associated with several research projects under the Indian Council of Medical Research (ICMR).

== Career ==
Dr. Italia played a key role in initiating and implementing the state's sickle cell anemia control program, which was launched in 2006 during the tenure of then Chief Minister Narendra Modi. The program focused on early diagnosis and preventive healthcare among tribal populations.

He served as a co-investigator in several ICMR projects and was instrumental in developing strategies for managing genetic blood disorders in tribal communities.

== Recognition ==
In 2011, he received the Prime Minister's Award for Excellence in Public Administration under the leadership of Prime Minister Manmohan Singh.

In 2023, the Government of Gujarat honored him with the Chief Minister's Award, and in 2024, he was conferred the Padma Shri, India's fourth-highest civilian award, for his work in medicine.

In 2023, Dr. Italia was also honored as "Health Leader of the Year" at the NDTV Indian of the Year Awards.

== Awards ==
- Prime Minister's Award for Excellence in Public Administration (2011)
- Chief Minister's Award, Government of Gujarat (2023)
- Padma Shri in Medicine (2024)
- NDTV Health Leader of the Year (2023)
