= Vishwamurti Shastri =

Sanskrit scholar

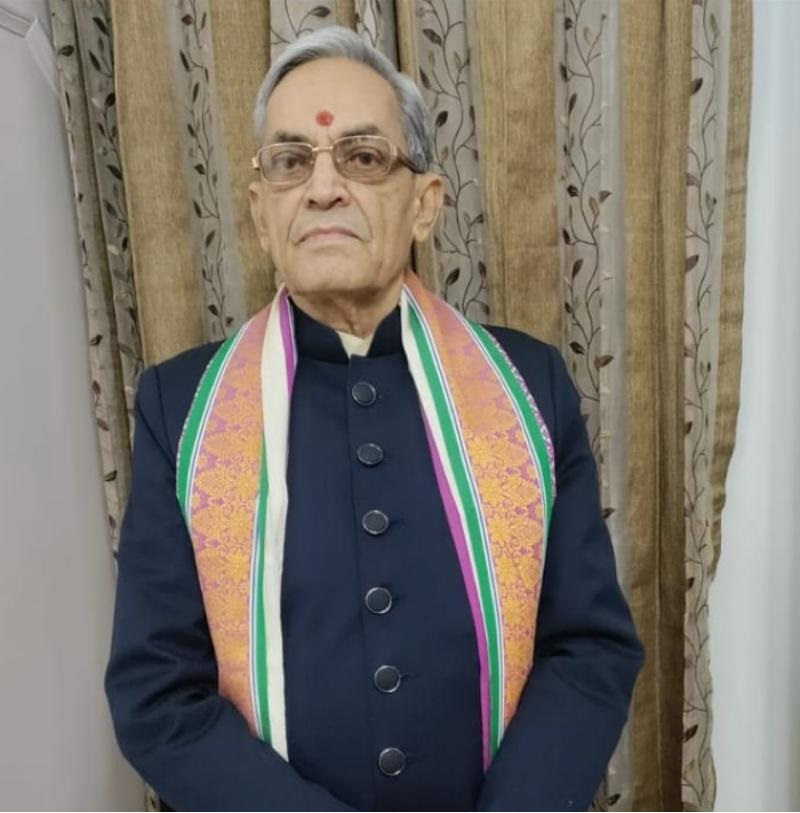
- Born: 1946; Udhampur, Jammu and Kashmir, British India
- Awards: Padma Shri

Vishwamurti Shastri is a Sanskrit scholar with knowledge of Vedic literature and related subjects. He served as a principal of Rashtriya Sanskrit Sansthan, Jammu. He was appointed to Amarnathji Shrine Board (SASB) in 2019. He is director of Shri Mata Vaishno Devi Gurukul, Katra. He also serves as the chairman of J&K Dharmarth Trust Advisory Committee.

Prof Shastri has written a number of books in Sanskrit. He has organized non-formal Sanskrit teaching programs in J&K. He has also delivered religious discourses from Shri Mata Vaishno Devi Bhawan, which are telecast live on national TV channels during Navratras.

The Government of India honored him in 2022, with the fourth-highest civilian award of Padma Shri.

== Early life and Education ==
Professor Vishwa Murti Shastri was born on October 10, 1946. He was born in a small village in the Ramnagar tehsil of Udhampur District. His parents were Pandit Anant Ram Jyotshi and Uma Devi. He began his life in a small village in Ramban.

== Career and Contributions ==
Professor Shastri is a distinguished Sanskrit scholar. He has served for over 50 years in teaching and administration. He is an alumnus of the University of Jammu. The Department of Sanskrit at the University of Jammu organized a felicitation program in his honour.

== Published Works ==
He has authored several books, some of which were released by the Lieutenant Governor of Jammu and Kashmir. His books focus on authentic methods of performing pūjā and rituals based on Jyotiṣa Vijñāna (Vedic astrology) and traditional śāstric knowledge.

A Festschrift in his honour, titled Viśvamūrtivaibhavam, was published in 2015. The volume contains scholarly articles on his life, contributions, and research in Vedic studies and Sanskrit literature.

== Awards and honours ==
Vishwamurti Shastri was awarded the President's award for classical language scholars in 2009. He was awarded the fourth-highest civilian award, Padma Shri by the Indian Government in 2022
