= Radhe Devi =

Indian designer

- Born: Manipur
- Occupation: Designer
- Awards: Padma Shri in 2021

Radhe Devi is an Indian bridal wear designer and social worker. In 2021, she was awarded Padma Shri by the Indian Government for her contribution in Arts.

== Early life ==
Devi is from Wangjing Sorokhaibam Leikai in the Thoubal district of Manipur.

== Career ==
Devi started her career at age of 25 when she learnt the process of Potloi. She has also designed costumes for the Khamba-Thoibi dance. She is also involved in social work and works for women empowerment.

== Awards ==
- Padma Shri in 2021
