= Vijaykumar Vinayak Dongre =

Indian doctor

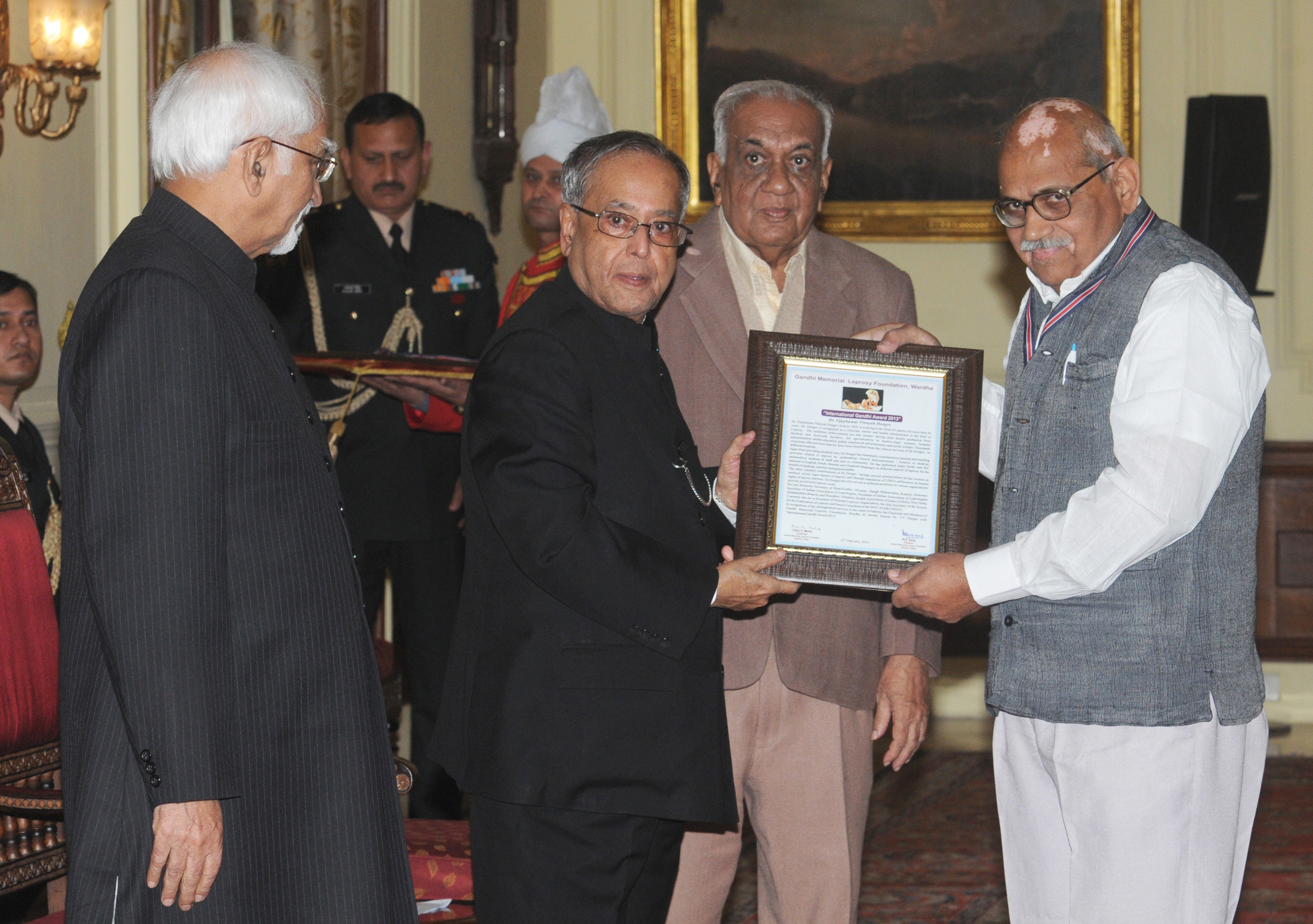
- Dr. Vijaykumar Vinayak Dongre receiving the International Gandhi Award in 2013 from President Pranab Mukherjee in New Delhi
- Born: 1940 (age 85–86); Mumbai, Maharashtra, India
- Occupations: Medical doctor, social worker
- Organization(s): The Society for Eradication of Leprosy, Mumbai
- Known for: Eradication of leprosy in urban and rural areas of Maharashtra
- Awards: Padma Shri (2022)

Vijaykumar Vinayak Dongre (V V Dongre, born 1940) is a medical doctor from Mumbai who has devoted his entire life for the eradication of leprosy in the urban and rural areas, including the tribal areas, in the Indian State of Maharashtra. According to some estimates, there were approximately 4 million leprosy patients in India in 1981, but after the efforts of Dongre and others this has come down to 83,000. Dongre is affiliated to The Society for Eradication of Leprosy, Mumbai and is serving the Society as its Honorary Secretary. Dongre was associated with Acworth Leprosy Hospital, Mumbai as the Medical Superintendent for nearly 35 years and with Gandhi Memorial Foundation, Wardha as a director for nearly 8 years.

Dongre is a Graduate of Faculty of Aurvedic Medicine (GFAM), holds the MBBS degree, and Post-Graduate Diplomas in Public Relations and Advertising Management and Medico-Legal Systems.

== Positions held ==
Dongre has held several important positions in various organisations involved in the efforts for the eradication of leprosy. These include

- President, National Leprosy Organisation (NLO)
- Hon. Secretary, Society for the Eradication of Leprosy, Bombay
- Sr. Consultant, LEAP, ALERT-INDIA
- President, Voluntary Health Association of India New Delhi
- President, Indian Association of Leprologists (Maharashtra Branch)
- Hon. Secretary, International Leprosy Union, Pune
- Hon. Secretary, Acworth Leprosy Hospital-Society for RRE in Leprosy, Mumbai
- Hon. Secretary, Hind Kusht Nivaran Sangh, Maha Branch

== Publications ==
Dongre has published several research papers relating to eradication of leprosy. Some of the research publications of Dogre, coauthored with his colleagues, have been cited in Google Scholar portal. To create awareness about leprosy, Dongre has also written and distributed 52 booklets on leprosy.

== Awards and recognition ==
- In the year 2022, Govt of India conferred the Padma Shri award, the third highest award in the Padma series of awards, on Vijaykumar Vinayak Dongre for his distinguished service in the field of medicine. The award is in recognition of his service as a "Veteran Dermatologist and Social Worker dedicated his life to working for Leprosy patients".
- International Gandhi Award (2013)
- Lifetime Achievement Award by The Indian Association of Leprologists (2021)
