= Subhadra Devi =

Indian artist

Subhadra Devi is a Mithilia artist from Bihar, India known for her Madhubani art. She was awarded India's fourth highest civilian award, the Padma Shri, in 2023.

== Personal life ==
She was born in 1941 in Madhubani, Bihar. Her exact date of birth is unknown. She was a resident of Salempur village in Madhubani district.

She remained active in artwork from 1970 to till now. Her art work "Kṛṣṇa and Radha in a banana grove" is displayed in the British Museum.
