= V. K. Munusamy =

Indian Terracotta artist

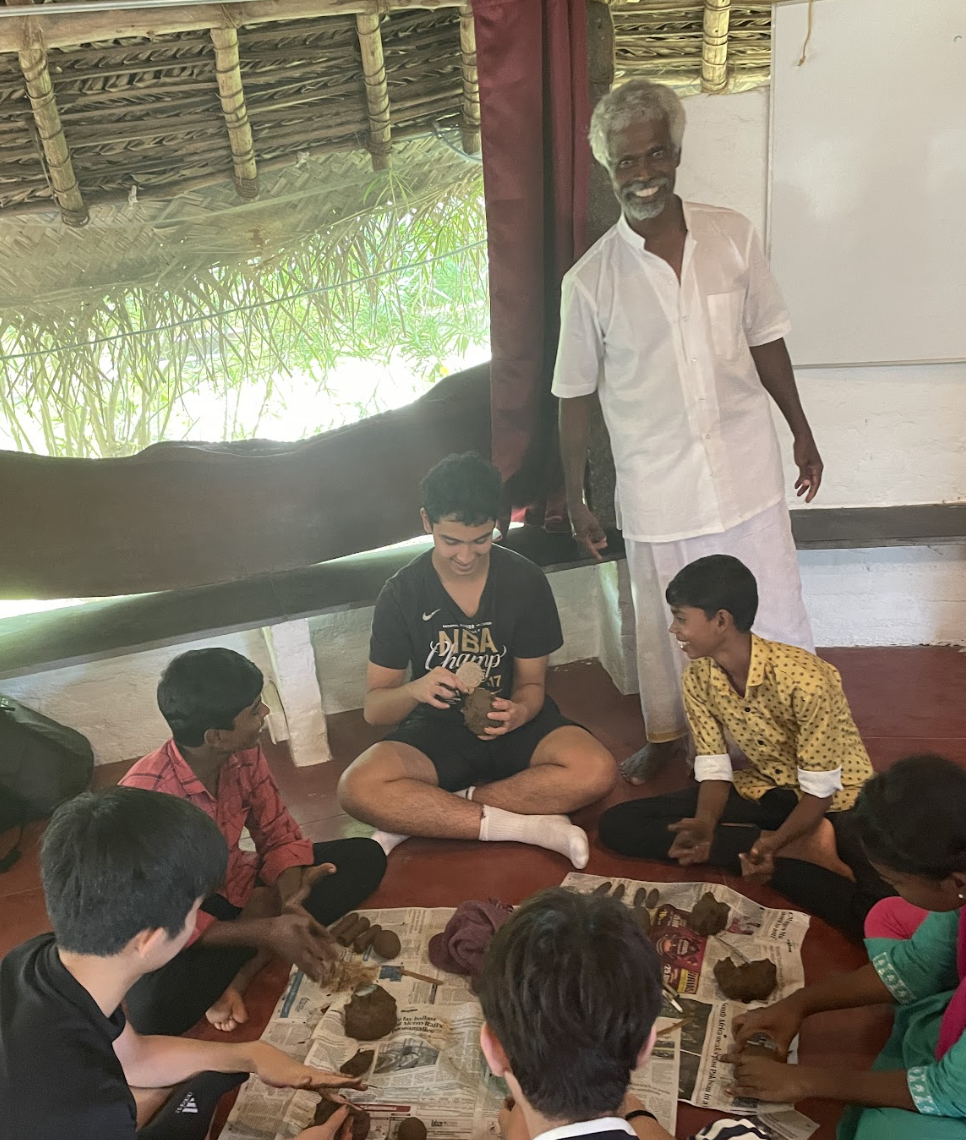
Munusamy hosting a terracotta crafts session with students in Puducherry. Ganeshas, Tsunami Ganeshas, Elephants and Horses are among the figures he teaches students to make.

V. K. Munusamy also known as V. K. Munusamy Krishnapakthar is an Indian Terracotta artist. He won Padma Shri award in the year 2020 for his work in the field of Terracotta Artistry. Munusamy is credited with numerous world recognized works of art, including the world's tallest terracotta horse measuring 17 ½ feet installed in American International School, Chennai.
