= List of Padma Shri award recipients in art =

Recipients of a civilian award in India

This is a list of recipients of the Padma Shri award in the field of Art. The Padma Shri is the fourth-highest civilian award of the Republic of India, after the Bharat Ratna, the Padma Vibhushan and the Padma Bhushan. Instituted in 1954, the award is conferred by the President of India at ceremonial functions which are held at Rashtrapati Bhavan.

As of 2026, a total of 952 individuals have been awarded Padma Shri for their contributions to art.

== 1950–1959 ==
Year	Name	State/Country
1954	Nandalal Bose	West Bengal
1954	Madurai Shanmugavadivu Subbalakshmi	Tamil Nadu
1954	Jamini Roy	West Bengal
1955	Thakore Pandit Onkar Nath	Uttar Pradesh
1956	Rukmini Devi Arundale	Tamil Nadu
1956	Sthanam Narasimha Rao	Andhra Pradesh
1957	Pt. Shrikrishna N. Ratanjankar	Uttar Pradesh
1957	T. Balasaraswathi	Tamil Nadu
1957	Ustad Mushtaq Husain Khan	Madhya Pradesh
1957	Dwaram Venkataswami Naidu	Andhra Pradesh
1957	Sudhir Ranjan Khastgir	Uttar Pradesh
1958	Debi Prosad Roy-Choudhry	West Bengal
1958	Ariyakudi Ramanuja Iyengar	Tamil Nadu
1958	Ustad Allauddin Khan	Uttar Pradesh
1958	Kum. Nargis ( Fatima A Rasheed )	Maharashtra
1958	Debaki Kumar Bose	West Bengal
1958	Satyajit Roy	West Bengal
1958	Shambhoo Maharaj	Uttar Pradesh
1958	Devika Rani	Karnataka
1959	Kankanhalli Vasudevacharya	Karnataka
1959	Pammal Sambanda Mudaliar	Tamil Nadu
1959	Sisir Kumar Bhaduri	West Bengal

== 1960–1969 ==
Year	Name	State/Country
1960	Ustad Hafiz Ali Khan	Madhya Pradesh
1960	Vir Vati	Delhi
1961	Svetoslav Roerich	Russia
1961	Bismillah Khan	Uttar Pradesh
1961	Kattingeri Krishna Hebbar	Maharashtra
1961	Raghunath Krishna Phadke	Madhya Pradesh
1962	Bade Ghulam Ali Khan	Maharashtra
1962	Ashok Kumar Ganguly	Maharashtra
1963	Mehboob Khan	Maharashtra
1963	Melville DeMellow	Rajasthan
1964	Narayanrao Shripad Rajhans alias Bal Gandharva	Maharashtra
1964	Adi Marzban	Maharashtra
1964	Pratul Chandra Sorcar	West Bengal
1964	Vinayak Pandurang Karmarkar	Maharashtra
1965	Satyajit Ray	West Bengal
1965	Guru Kunju Kurup	Kerala
1965	Ravishanker Mahashanker Raval	Gujarat
1965	Vuppalathadiyam Nagayya	Tamil Nadu
1965	Mrinalini Sarabhai	Gujarat
1966	Shankar Pillai	Delhi
1966	Zubin Mehta	Canada
1966	Eswara Iyer Krishna Iyer	Tamil Nadu
1966	Maqbool Fida Husain	Delhi
1966	Villupuram Chinnaiya Ganesan	Tamil Nadu
1966	Bhanumati Ramakrishna	Tamil Nadu
1966	Sumitra Charat Ram	Delhi
1967	Ali Akbar Khan	West Bengal
1967	Ravi Shankar	Uttar Pradesh
1967	Madras Lalithangi Vasanthakumari	Andhra Pradesh
1967	Krishnachandra Moreshwar alias Daji Bhatawadekar	Maharashtra
1967	Mohammad Rafi	Punjab
1967	Sasadhar Mukerji	Maharashtra
1967	Vasant Desai	Maharashtra
1967	Vinjamuri Venkata Lakshmi Narasimha Rao	Tamil Nadu
1967	Siddheshwari Devi	Delhi
1968	Bismillah Khan	Uttar Pradesh
1968	Yamini Krishnamurti	Delhi
1968	Ayodhya Prasad	Uttar Pradesh
1968	Akkineni Nageswara Rao	Andhra Pradesh
1968	Devi Lal Samar	Rajasthan
1968	Jaikishan Dahyabhai Panchal	Maharashtra
1968	Joseph Harold	Delhi
1968	Murlidhar Ramchandra Achrekar	Maharashtra
1968	Nandamuri Taraka Rama Rao	Andhra Pradesh
1968	Nikhil Banerjee	West Bengal
1968	Shankar Singh Raghuvanshi	Maharashtra
1968	Sunil Dutt	Maharashtra
1968	Akhtari Bai Faizabadi (Begum Akhtar)	Uttar Pradesh
1968	Durga Khote	Maharashtra
1968	Vyjayanthimala	Tamil Nadu
1968	Sharan Rani Backliwal	Delhi
1969	Lata Dinanath Mangeshkar	Maharashtra
1969	Prithviraj Kapoor	Punjab
1969	Rahim-ud-din Khan Dagar	Delhi
1969	Semmangudi Srinivasa Iyer	Tamil Nadu
1969	Subramaniam Sreenivasan Vasan	Tamil Nadu
1969	Kesarbai Kerkar	Maharashtra
1969	Narayan Sridhar Bendre	Maharashtra
1969	Balraj Sahni	Punjab
1969	David Abraham	Maharashtra
1969	Khwaja Ahmad Abbas	Maharashtra
1969	Sukhdev	Maharashtra
1969	Sachin Dev Burman	West Bengal
1969	Sadashiva Rath Sharma	Odisha
1969	Singannachar Narasimha Swamy	Andhra Pradesh
1969	Byrappa Saroja Devi	Karnataka
1969	Indrani Rehman	Delhi

== 1970–1979 ==
Year	Name	State/Country
1970	Ahmad Jan Thirkawa	Uttar Pradesh
1970	Ramkinkar Baiz	West Bengal
1970	Sombhu Mitra	West Bengal
1970	Hirabai Barodekar	Maharashtra
1970	Kamala	Tamil Nadu
1970	Abdul Halim Jaffer Khan	Maharashtra
1970	Avinash Anandrai Vyas	Maharashtra
1970	Ezra Mir	Maharashtra
1970	Ghantasala Venkateswara Rao	Andhra Pradesh
1970	Kalamandalam Krishnan Nair	Kerala
1970	Karl Jamshed Khandalavala	Maharashtra
1970	M. Krishnan	Tamil Nadu
1970	Maisnam Amubi Singh	Manipur
1970	Mallikarjun Mansur	Karnataka
1970	Pankaj Kumar Mullick	West Bengal
1970	Prem Dhawan	Maharashtra
1970	Rajendra Kumar	Maharashtra
1970	Ram Chatur Mallik	Bihar
1970	Ramaswamy Ganesan	Tamil Nadu
1970	Relangi Venkataramaiah	Andhra Pradesh
1970	Ritwik Ghatak	West Bengal
1970	Sukumar Bose	Delhi
1970	T.R. Mahalingam	Tamil Nadu
1970	Vedantam Satyanarayana Sarma	Andhra Pradesh
1970	Vijaya Raghava Rao	West Bengal
1970	Damayanti Joshi	Maharashtra
1970	Kodumudi Balambal Sundarambal	Tamil Nadu
1970	Ratna Fabri	Rajasthan
1971	Uday Shankar	West Bengal
1971	Ustad Allauddin Khan	Madhya Pradesh
1971	Pichu Sambamoorthi	Tamil Nadu
1971	Amir Khan	Maharashtra
1971	Jaishankar Sundari	Gujarat
1971	Krishnarao Phulambrikar alias Krishnarao	Maharashtra
1971	Musiri Subramania Iyer	Tamil Nadu
1971	Nisar Husain Khan	Uttar Pradesh
1971	Palghat Tiruvillvamalai Seshan Mani Iyer	Tamil Nadu
1971	Poyippilli Kalathil Kunju Kurup	Kerala
1971	Raj Kapoor	Maharashtra
1971	Rasipuram Krishnaswami Laxman	Maharashtra
1971	Damal Krishnaswami Pattamal	Tamil Nadu
1971	Gangubai Hanagal	Karnataka
1971	Pt. Siyaram Tiwari	Bihar
1971	Chengannur Raman Pillai	Kerala
1971	Karaola; Natesa Pillai Dhandayuthapani Pillai	Tamil Nadu
1971	Mangalampalli Balamurali Krishna	Tamil Nadu
1971	Manna Dey	Maharashtra
1971	Qadri Ragi Aziz Ahmed Khan Warsi	Andhra Pradesh
1971	Ravi Shankar Sharma	Haryana
1971	Sankho Chaudhuri	Delhi
1971	Trivandrum Kandaswami Pillai Shanmugam	Tamil Nadu
1971	Vazhenkata Kunchu Nair	Kerala
1971	Shanta Rao	Karnataka
1971	Tripti Mitra	West Bengal
1972	Vinayakbuwa Patwardhan	Maharashtra
1972	B. N. Sircar	Bihar
1972	Papanasam Ramayya Sivan	Tamil Nadu
1972	Gubbi Hampanna Veeranna	Karnataka
1972	Waheeda Rahman	Maharashtra
1972	Bhim Sen Joshi	Maharashtra
1972	Hrishikesh Mukherjee	Maharashtra
1972	Krishna Reddy	France
1972	Lalgudi Jayaraman	Tamil Nadu
1972	Madras Kandaswamy Radha	Tamil Nadu
1972	Mahendra Kapoor	Maharashtra
1972	Chiranjit	Delhi
1972	Raghu Rai	Delhi
1972	Ram Kumar	Delhi
1972	Samta Prasad	Uttar Pradesh
1972	Sunil Janah	Delhi
1972	Surendra Nath Banerjee	West Bengal
1972	Takhelehangbam Amudon Sharma	Manipur
1972	Vasudeo Santu Gaitonde	Maharashtra
1972	Vazhuvoor Bagyalakshmi Ramiah Pillai	Tamil Nadu
1972	Girija Devi	Uttar Pradesh
1972	Juthika Ray	West Bengal
1972	Savitri Indrajit Parekh	Gujarat
1972	Suchitra Sen	West Bengal
1973	Chembai Vaidyanatha Bhagavathar	Kerala
1973	Krishna Rao Shankar Pandit	Madhya Pradesh
1973	Maqbool Fida Husain	Delhi
1973	Kum. Uma Sharma	Delhi
1973	Balasubramania Sastrigal alias Balu Bhagvathar	Tamil Nadu
1973	Chellasami Sirchabai Murugabhupathy	Tamil Nadu
1973	Kishan Maharaj	Uttar Pradesh
1973	S.G. Thakar Singh	Punjab
1973	Shakoor Khan	Delhi
1973	Thikkurissy Sukumaran Nair	Kerala
1973	Tripunittura Narayanan Krishnan	Tamil Nadu
1973	Sitara Devi	Maharashtra
1974	Binode Behari Mukherjee	Uttarakhand
1974	Alice Bonner	Italy
1974	B. Narsimha Reddy	Andhra Pradesh
1974	Chintamani Kar	West Bengal
1974	Dhiren Ganguli	West Bengal
1974	Thakur Jaideva Singh	Uttar Pradesh
1974	Mogubai Kurdikar	Maharashtra
1974	Shriram Lagoo	Maharashtra
1974	Ali Hasan @ Kalloo Hafiz	Uttar Pradesh
1974	Emani Sankara Sastri	Delhi
1974	Ghulam Qadir Lalla	Jammu and Kashmir
1974	Girish Karnad	Karnataka
1974	Kelucharan Mohapatra	Odisha
1974	Kirpal Singh Shekhawat	Rajasthan
1974	Manjapara Devesa Bhagavathar Ramanathan	Kerala
1974	Mani Madhava Chakyar	Kerala
1974	Thiruvizhimazhalai Subramania Pillai	Tamil Nadu
1974	Manik Amar Varma	Maharashtra
1974	Muryam Begum	Jammu and Kashmir
1974	Nina Ripjit Singh @ Naina Devi	Delhi
1974	Nutan Bahl	Maharashtra
1975	Madurai Shanmugavadivu Subbalakshmi	Tamil Nadu
1975	Begum Akhtar (posthumous)	Uttar Pradesh
1975	Kalpatthi Ganapathi Subramanyan	West Bengal
1975	Jasraj	Maharashtra
1975	Amjad Ali Khan	Delhi
1975	Basava Raja Mahanthaswamy Rajaguru	Karnataka
1975	Gitchandra Tongbra	Manipur
1975	Gopi Krishna	Maharashtra
1975	Kettassery Joseph Jesudas	Kerala
1975	Kalyanam Raghu Ramaiah	Andhra Pradesh
1975	M. S. Sathyu	Maharashtra
1975	Madras Sundaram Iyer Gopalakrishnan	Tamil Nadu
1975	Jagdamba Devi	Bihar
1975	Sanjukta Panigrahi	Odisha
1976	Keshav Shankar Pillai	Delhi
1976	Satyajit Ray	West Bengal
1976	Mallikarjuna Bhimarayappa Mansoor	Karnataka
1976	Pandit Ram Narayan	Maharashtra
1976	Balkrishna Raghunath Deodhar	Maharashtra
1976	Madurai S. Somasundaram	Tamil Nadu
1976	Nimai Charan Harichandan	Odisha
1976	Palghat Kollengode Viswanath Narayanaswamy	Tamil Nadu
1976	Raghunath Mahapatra	Odisha
1976	Rattehalli Nagendra Rao	Karnataka
1976	Shyam Benegal	Maharashtra
1976	Parveen Sultana	Maharashtra
1976	Ustad Fayyaz Ahmed Khan	Maharashtra
1977	T. Balasaraswati	Tamil Nadu
1977	Koduvayur Sivarama Narayanaswami	Maharashtra
1977	Paramsukh J. Pandya	Maharashtra
1977	Shivputra Sidhram Komkali Alias Kumar Gandharva	Madhya Pradesh
1977	Annapurna Ravi Shankar	Uttar Pradesh
1977	Bhupendra Kumar Hazarika	Assam
1977	Sheik Chinna Moulana	Tamil Nadu
1977	Dhan Raj Bhagat	Delhi
1977	Gulam Rasul Santosh	Delhi
1977	Jehangir Ardeshir Sabavala	Maharashtra
1977	Ustad Allarakha Khan Qureshi	Jammu and Kashmir

== 1980–1989 ==
Year	Name	State/Country
1980	Bismillah Khan	Uttar Pradesh
1981	Ravi Shankar	Maharashtra
1981	Mrinal Sen	West Bengal
1981	Padma Subrahmanyam	Tamil Nadu
1981	Babukudi Venkataramana Karanth	Karnataka
1981	Dashrath Patel	Gujarat
1981	Gambhir Singh Mura	West Bengal
1981	Namagiripettai Kathasamy Krishnan	Tamil Nadu
1981	Sayed Haider Raza	France
1981	Sita Devi	Delhi
1982	S. Balachander	Tamil Nadu
1982	Ustad Khadim Husain Khan	Maharashtra
1982	Jabbar Razak Patel	Maharashtra
1982	Ammannur Madhava Chakyar	Kerala
1982	Gautam Vaghela	Maharashtra
1982	Virendra Prabhakar	Delhi
1982	Sushree Hajjan Allah Jilai Bai	Rajasthan
1983	Sringanellur Puttaswamaiah Muthuraj (Raj Kumar)	Karnataka
1983	V. Doreswamy Iyengar	Karnataka
1983	Pt Vishnu Govind Jog	West Bengal
1983	Prem Nazir	Kerala
1983	Sir Richard Samuel Attenborough	United Kingdom
1983	Isai Mani' Seerkhazi S. Govindarajan	Tamil Nadu
1983	Miss Pamela Cullen	United Kingdom
1983	Sardar Sohan Singh	Punjab
1983	Gulam Mohammed Sheikh	Gujarat
1983	Habib Tanvir	Delhi
1983	Narain Singh Thapa	Maharashtra
1983	Nepal Mahto	West Bengal
1983	Prabhu Handel Manuel	Tamil Nadu
1983	Raghubir Singh	France
1983	Sobha Singh	Himachal Pradesh
1983	Kanwal Sidhu (Nee Randhawa)	Punjab
1983	Ustad Sharafat Hussain Khan	Uttar Pradesh
1984	Sripada Pinakapani	Andhra Pradesh
1984	Bhavesh Chandra Sanyal	Madhya Pradesh
1984	Jnan Prakash Ghosh	West Bengal
1984	Vijay Dhondopant Tendulkar	Maharashtra
1984	Villupuram Chinniah Ganesan (Shivaji Ganesan)	Tamil Nadu
1984	(Smt.) N. Rajam	Uttar Pradesh
1984	Miss Roshan Kumari Faqir Mohammed	Maharashtra
1984	Pt. Purushottam Das Pakhawaji	Rajasthan
1984	Pt. Vinaya Chandra Maudalya	Delhi
1984	Adoor Gopalakrishnan	Kerala
1984	Amitabh Bachchan	Maharashtra
1984	Ben Kingsley	United Kingdom
1984	Bhupen P. Khakhar	Gujarat
1984	Hari Krishna Wattal	Uttar Pradesh
1984	Mavelikkara Krishnankutty Nair	Kerala
1984	Nek Chand Saini	Chandigarh
1984	Raja Reddy	Delhi
1984	Ramgopal Vijaiwargiya	Rajasthan
1984	Ganga Devi	Bihar
1984	Radha Reddy	Delhi
1985	Bhimsen Gururaj Joshi	Maharashtra
1985	Santidev Ghose	West Bengal
1985	Kalanidhi Narayanan	Tamil Nadu
1985	Miss Elizabeth Brunner	Delhi
1985	Miss Smita Shivajirao Patil	Maharashtra
1985	Asa Singh Mastana	Delhi
1985	Laxman Pai	Goa
1985	Naseeruddin Shah	Maharashtra
1985	Palghat Ramaswami Raghu	Tamil Nadu
1985	Shanti Dave	Gujarat
1986	Birju Maharaj	Delhi
1986	Ustad Nasir Aminuddin Dagar	West Bengal
1986	Hisamudin Usta	Rajasthan
1986	Rajkumar Singhajit Singh	Delhi
1986	S.M. Shinde @ Shankar Bapuji Appegaonkar	Maharashtra
1986	Shaik Nazar	Andhra Pradesh
1986	Subrata Mitra	West Bengal
1986	Kanika Bandyopadhyaya	West Bengal
1987	Late Shri Nikhil Ranjan Banerjee	West Bengal
1987	Kishori Ravindra Amonkar	Maharashtra
1987	N. Ramani	Tamil Nadu
1987	Badri Narayan	Andhra Pradesh
1987	Kailasam Balachander	Tamil Nadu
1987	Naresh Sohal	United Kingdom
1987	Aparna Sen	West Bengal
1987	Kumudini Lakhia	Gujarat
1987	Vijaya Farrokh Mehta	Maharashtra
1988	Akkineni Nageswara Rao	Telangana
1988	Kelucharan Mohapatra	Maharashtra
1988	Bikash Bhattacharjee	West Bengal
1988	Jitendra Bhikaji Abhisheki	Maharashtra
1988	Kudrat Singh	Rajasthan
1988	Sudarshan Sahoo	Odisha
1988	Umayalpuram Kasiviswanatha Sivaraman	Tamil Nadu
1988	Zakir Hussain	United States of America
1988	Chindodi Leela	Karnataka
1988	Shabana Azmi	Maharashtra
1988	Sudharani Raghupathy	Tamil Nadu
1988	Teejan Bai	Chhattisgarh
1989	Ustad Ali Akbar Khan	West Bengal
1989	Kattingeri Krishna Hebbar	Maharashtra
1989	Girija Devi	Uttar Pradesh
1989	L. Subramaniam	Tamil Nadu
1989	Adyar K. Lakshman	Tamil Nadu
1989	Hakubhai Vajubhai Shah	Gujarat
1989	Ratan Thiyam	Manipur
1989	Sheikh Shams Uddin	Uttar Pradesh
1989	Upendra Jethalal Trivedi	Gujarat

== 1990–1999 ==
Year	Name	State/Country
1990	Sammangudi Radhakrishnier Srinivasier	Tamil Nadu
1990	Kumar Gandharva	Madhya Pradesh
1990	Pt. Jasraj	Maharashtra
1990	Pt. Nikhil Ghosh	Maharashtra
1990	Purushottam Laxman Deshpande	Maharashtra
1990	(Smt.) Kanak Yatindra Rele	Maharashtra
1990	(Smt.) Kapila Vatsyayan	Delhi
1990	Mohan Mahadeo Agashe	Maharashtra
1990	Dr.(Smt.) Prabha Atre	Maharashtra
1990	Kum. Leela Samson	Delhi
1990	Pandit Balwantrai Gulabrai Bhatt 'Bhavrang'	Uttar Pradesh
1990	Allu Ramalingaiah	Tamil Nadu
1990	Bishamber Khanna	Delhi
1990	G. Aravindan	Kerala
1990	Jagdish Chandra Mittal	Telangana
1990	Kamal Haasan	Tamil Nadu
1990	Krishen Khanna	Delhi
1990	Madurai Ponnusamy Natesan-Sethuraman	Tamil Nadu
1990	Maharajapuram Viswanatha Santhanam	Tamil Nadu
1990	Om Puri	Maharashtra
1990	Raj Bisaria	Uttar Pradesh
1990	Sattanatha Muthaiah Ganapathy	Andhra Pradesh
1990	Tarun Majumder	West Bengal
1990	Asghari Bai	Madhya Pradesh
1990	Diwaliben Punjabhai Bhil	Gujarat
1990	Gulab Bai	Uttar Pradesh
1990	Madhavi Mudgal	Delhi
1991	Mangalampalli Balamurali Krishna	Tamil Nadu
1991	Maqbool Fida Hussain	Maharashtra
1991	Basavaraj Rajguru	Karnataka
1991	Narayan Shridhar Bendre	Maharashtra
1991	Pt. Ram Narayan	Maharashtra
1991	Pt. Samta Prasad alias Gudai Maharaj	Uttar Pradesh
1991	Amjad Ali Khan	Delhi
1991	Ebrahim Alkazi	Delhi
1991	Mohammad Yusuf Khan alias Dilip Kumar	Maharashtra
1991	Shyam Benegal	Maharashtra
1991	Amala Shankar	West Bengal
1991	(Smt.) Shanno Khurana	Delhi
1991	Kum. Alarmel Valli	Tamil Nadu
1991	Pandit Shiv Kumar Sharma	Maharashtra
1991	Sharda Sinha	Bihar
1991	Sardar Gurcharan Singh	Punjab
1991	Bharat Gopy	Kerala
1991	Maharaj Krishan Kumar	Delhi
1991	Manu Parekh	Delhi
1991	Rajkumar Suddhendra Narayan Singh Deo	Jharkhand
1991	Ranbir Singh Bisht	Uttar Pradesh
1991	Mani Narayan	Maharashtra
1991	Pratima Barua Pandey	Assam
1991	Ustad Ghulam Mustafa Khan	Maharashtra
1991	Ustad Hafeez Ahmed Khan	Delhi
1992	Satyajit Ray (Posthumous)	West Bengal
1992	Mallikarjun Bheemarayappa Mansoor	Karnataka
1992	V. Shantaram (Posthumous)	Maharashtra
1992	Kaloji Narayana Rao	Telangana
1992	Dr. K. Venkatalakshamma	Karnataka
1992	Trippunithura Narayan Krishnan	Delhi
1992	Pt. Chintaman Raghunath Vyas	Maharashtra
1992	Pt. Devabrata Chaudhuri (Debu)	Delhi
1992	Pt. Hariprasad Chaurasia	Maharashtra
1992	Adusumalli Radha Krishna	Telangana
1992	Girish Karnad	Karnataka
1992	Kongara Jaggaiah	Tamil Nadu
1992	Naushad	Maharashtra
1992	Talat Mahmood	Maharashtra
1992	Byrappa Saroja Devi Sri Harsha	Karnataka
1992	Mrinalini Sarabhai	Gujarat
1992	Sonal Mansingh	Delhi
1992	Nataraja Ramakrishna	Andhra Pradesh
1992	Guru Pankaj Charan Das	Odisha
1992	Asha Parekh	Maharashtra
1992	Kum. Srirangam Gopalarathnam	Andhra Pradesh
1992	Anandji Virji Shah	Maharashtra
1992	Bhagaban Sahu	Odisha
1992	Biren De	Delhi
1992	Chittu Tudu	Bihar
1992	Kalyanji Virji Shah	Maharashtra
1992	Kasinadhuni Vishwanath	Tamil Nadu
1992	Madurai Narayanan Krishnan	Tamil Nadu
1992	Manoj Kumar	Maharashtra
1992	Muthu Muthiah Sthapathi	Tamil Nadu
1992	Tadepalli Venkanna	Andhra Pradesh
1992	Tapan Sinha	West Bengal
1992	Chitra Visweswaran	Tamil Nadu
1992	Jaya Bachchan	Maharashtra
1992	Meera Mukherjee	West Bengal
1992	Shovana Narayan	Delhi
1992	Sunita Kohli	Delhi
1992	Ustad Sabri Khan	Delhi
1998	Madurai Shanmukhavadivu Subbalakshmi	Tamil Nadu
1998	Vempati Chinna Satyam	Tamil Nadu
1998	Kongbrailatpam Ibomcha Sharma alias Abhiramshaba Sharma	Manipur
1998	Krishnarao Sable	Maharashtra
1998	Kunja Bihari Meher	Odisha
1998	P.I. Mohammed Kutty (Mammootty)	Tamil Nadu
1998	Uppalapu Shrinivas	Tamil Nadu
1998	Dipali Borthakur	Assam
1998	Zohra Segal	Delhi
1999	Ravi Shankar	United States of America
1999	Lata Dinanath Mangeshkar	Maharashtra
1999	Bhimsen Joshi	Maharashtra
1999	Satish Gujral	Delhi
1999	Damal Krishnaswamy Pattammal	Tamil Nadu
1999	Ashok Kumar	Maharashtra
1999	Sumati Mutatkar	Delhi
1999	Saryu Doshi	Maharashtra
1999	Jagmohan Sursagar	Maharashtra
1999	Javed Akhtar	Maharashtra
1999	Ram Vanji Sutar	Maharashtra
1999	Tsering Wangdus	Ladakh
1999	Shobha Deepak Singh	Delhi
1999	Sulochana Latkar	Maharashtra

== 2000–2009 ==
Year	Name	State/Country
2000	Kelucharan Mohapatra	Odisha
2000	Pandit Hari Prasad Chaurasia	Maharashtra
2000	Jasraj	Maharashtra
2000	Raja Reddy	Delhi
2000	Rajinikanth	Tamil Nadu
2000	Radha Reddy	Delhi
2000	Sharan Rani Backliwal	Delhi
2000	Ramanand Sagar	Maharashtra
2000	Allah Rakha Rahman	Tamil Nadu
2000	Alyque Padamsee	Maharashtra
2000	Kanhai Chitrakar	Uttar Pradesh
2000	Shekhar Kapur	Maharashtra
2000	Anjolie Ela Menon	Delhi
2000	Hema Malini	Maharashtra
2000	Shubha Mudgal	Delhi
2001	Lata Dinanath Mangeshkar	Maharashtra
2001	Bismillah Khan	Uttar Pradesh
2001	Shiv Kumar Sharma	Maharashtra
2001	Amjad Ali Khan	Delhi
2001	Hrishikesh Mukherjee	Maharashtra
2001	Zubin Mehta	United States of America
2001	Yamini Krishnamurti	Delhi
2001	Bhupen Hazarika	Maharashtra
2001	Lakshminarayana Subramaniam	Tamil Nadu
2001	Dr.(Smt.) Paluvai Bhanumathi Ramakrishna	Tamil Nadu
2001	Uma Sharma	Delhi
2001	Amitabh Bachchan	Maharashtra
2001	Baldev Raj Chopra	Maharashtra
2001	Dev Anand	Maharashtra
2001	Lalgudi Gopalaiyer Jayaraman	Tamil Nadu
2001	Pran Sikand	Maharashtra
2001	Raghunath Mohapatra	Odisha
2001	Avadhanam Sita Raman	Tamil Nadu
2001	Nerella Venumadhav	Andhra Pradesh
2001	Siramdasu Venkata Rama Rao	Andhra Pradesh
2001	Sunil Manilal Kothari	Delhi
2001	Aamir Raza Husain	Haryana
2001	D. V. S. Raju	Telangana
2001	Mohammed Tayab Khan	Rajasthan
2001	S. P. Balasubrahmanyam	Tamil Nadu
2001	Thota Tharani	Tamil Nadu
2001	Viswanathan Mohanlal	Tamil Nadu
2001	Padmaja Phenany Joglekar	Maharashtra
2001	Sobha Naidu	Andhra Pradesh
2002	Gangubai Hangal	Karnataka
2002	Kishan Maharaj	Uttar Pradesh
2002	Kishori Amonkar	Maharashtra
2002	Prabha Atre	Maharashtra
2002	Habib Ahmed Khan Tanvir	Madhya Pradesh
2002	Ismail Merchant	Maharashtra
2002	Kattassery Joseph Yesudas	Tamil Nadu
2002	Zakir Hussain	Maharashtra
2002	Shobha Gurtu	Maharashtra
2002	Kim Yang-shik	South Korea
2002	Saroja Vaidyanathan	Delhi
2002	Darshana Jhaveri	Maharashtra
2002	Kiran Segal	Delhi
2002	Vishwa Mohan Bhatt	Rajasthan
2002	Fazal Mohammad	Uttar Pradesh
2002	Govind Nihalani	Maharashtra
2002	Mani Ratnam	Tamil Nadu
2002	Navaneetham Padmanabha Seshadri	Delhi
2002	Rajan Devadas	United States of America
2002	Thettagudi Hariharasarma Vinayakram	Tamil Nadu
2002	Wannakuwattawaduge Don Amardeva	Sri Lanka
2002	Mani Krishnaswami	Tamil Nadu
2002	Manorama	Tamil Nadu
2002	Pushpa Bhuyan	Assam
2002	Raj Begum	Jammu and Kashmir
2002	Ustad Abdul Latif Khan	Madhya Pradesh
2003	Sonal Mansingh	Delhi
2003	Padma Subrahmanyam	Tamil Nadu
2003	Ammannur Madhava Chakyar	Kerala
2003	B. Rajam Iyer	Tamil Nadu
2003	Jagjit Singh	Maharashtra
2003	Madurai N. Krishnan	Tamil Nadu
2003	Naseeruddin Shah	Maharashtra
2003	P. S. Narayanaswamy	Tamil Nadu
2003	T. V. Sankaranarayanan	Tamil Nadu
2003	Trichur V. Ramachandran	Tamil Nadu
2003	Umayalpuram Kasiviswanatha Sivaraman	Tamil Nadu
2003	Swapnasundari	Delhi
2003	Teejan Bai	Chhattisgarh
2003	Malavika Sarukkai	Tamil Nadu
2003	Ranjana Gauhar	Delhi
2003	Rita Ganguly	Delhi
2003	Satish Vyas	Maharashtra
2003	Ram Gopal Bajaj	Telangana
2003	Aamir Khan	Maharashtra
2003	Danny Denzongpa	Maharashtra
2003	Nemi Chandra Jain	Delhi
2003	Om Prakash Jain	Delhi
2003	Sadashiv Vasantrao Gorakshkar	Maharashtra
2003	Thoguluva Meenakshi Iyengar Sounderarajan	Tamil Nadu
2003	Kshetrimayum Ongbi Thouranisabi Devi	Manipur
2003	Rakhee Gulzar	Maharashtra
2003	Sukumari Sathyabhama	Tamil Nadu
2003	Shafaat Ahmed Khan	Delhi
2004	N. Rajam	Maharashtra
2004	Komal Kothari (Posthumous)	Rajasthan
2004	Madurai Thirumalai Nambi Seshagopalan	Tamil Nadu
2004	Gulzar	Maharashtra
2004	Soumitra Chatterjee	West Bengal
2004	Alarmel Valli	Tamil Nadu
2004	Keezhpadam Kumaran Nair	Kerala
2004	Veernala Jayarama Rao	Delhi
2004	Bhajan Sopori	Delhi
2004	Pandit Surinder Singh	Delhi
2004	Pt. Damodar Keshav Datar	Maharashtra
2004	A. Hariharan	Maharashtra
2004	Anupam Pushkarnath Kher	Maharashtra
2004	Bharathiraja	Tamil Nadu
2004	Haridwaramangalam A. K. Palanivel	Tamil Nadu
2004	Heisnam Kanhailal	Manipur
2004	Kadri Gopalnath	Karnataka
2004	Kantibhai Baldevbhai Patel	Gujarat
2004	Krishn Kanhai	Uttar Pradesh
2004	Maguni Charan Das	Odisha
2004	Manoranjan Das	Odisha
2004	Morup Namgyal	Ladakh
2004	Neyyattinkara Vasudevan	Kerala
2004	Purshottam Das Jalota	Maharashtra
2004	Bharati Shivaji	Delhi
2004	Sikkil Natesan Neela	Tamil Nadu
2004	Sikkil Venkatraman Kunjumani	Tamil Nadu
2004	Sudha Raghunathan	Tamil Nadu
2005	Ram Narayan	Maharashtra
2005	Rasipuram Krishnaswamy Laxman	Maharashtra
2005	Yash Raj Chopra	Maharashtra
2005	A. Ramachandran	Delhi
2005	Probodh Chandra Manna Dey	Karnataka
2005	Kedar Nath Sahoo	Jharkhand
2005	Raasacharya Swami Ram Swaroop Sharma	Uttar Pradesh
2005	Chaturbhuj Meher	Odisha
2005	Kunnakudi Vaidyanathan	Tamil Nadu
2005	M. Boyer	Goa
2005	Muzaffar Ali	Delhi
2005	Punaram Nishad	Chhattisgarh
2005	Puran Chand Wadali	Punjab
2005	Shah Rukh Khan	Maharashtra
2005	Sougaijam Thanil Singh	Manipur
2005	Kavita Krishnamurti	Karnataka
2005	Komala Varadan	Delhi
2005	Krishnan Nair Santhakumari Chithra	Tamil Nadu
2005	Kumkum Mohanty	Odisha
2005	Shameem Dev Azad	Delhi
2005	Yumlembam Gambhini Devi	Manipur
2005	Ustad Ghulam Sadiq Khan	Delhi
2006	Adoor Gopalakrishnan	Kerala
2006	Shanno Khurana	Delhi
2006	Porayath Leela (Posthumous)	Tamil Nadu
2006	Sai Paranjpye	Maharashtra
2006	Kalapathi Ganapathi Subramanyan	Gujarat
2006	A. K. Hangal	Maharashtra
2006	Konidala Chiranjeevi	Telangana
2006	Abdul Halim Jaffer Khan	Maharashtra
2006	Ustad Ghulam Mustafa Khan	Maharashtra
2006	Ustad Sabri Khan	Delhi
2006	Yashodhar Mathpal	Uttarakhand
2006	Ileana Citaristi	Odisha
2006	Surinder Kaur	Haryana
2006	Shobana Chandrakumar	Tamil Nadu
2006	Shyama Charan Pati	Jharkhand
2006	Aribam Syam Sharma	Manipur
2006	Kavungal Chathunni Panicker	Kerala
2006	Madhup Mudgal	Delhi
2006	Mehmood Dhaulpuri	Delhi
2006	Pankaj Udhas	Maharashtra
2006	Prasad Sawkar	Goa
2006	Shree Lal Joshi	Rajasthan
2006	Gayatri Sankaran	Tamil Nadu
2006	Kanaka Srinivasan	Delhi
2006	Vasundhara Komkali	Madhya Pradesh
2006	Swami Harigovind	Uttar Pradesh
2006	Ustad Rashid Khan	West Bengal
2007	Somnath Hore (Posthumous)	West Bengal
2007	Pandit Rajan Misra	Delhi
2007	Pandit Sajan Misra	Delhi
2007	Kavalam Narayana Panikkar	Kerala
2007	Ramankutty Nair	Kerala
2007	Syed Haider Raza	France
2007	Tyeb Mehta	Maharashtra
2007	Ananda Shankar Jayant	Andhra Pradesh
2007	Mohan Babu	Andhra Pradesh
2007	Gajendra Narayan Singh	Bihar
2007	Govardhan Kumari	Gujarat
2007	Astad Aderbad Deboo	Maharashtra
2007	P. Gopinathan	Kerala
2007	Pannuru Sripathy	Telangana
2007	Remo Fernandes	Goa
2007	Susarla Dakshinamurthi	Tamil Nadu
2007	Balachandra Menon	Kerala
2007	Sonam Skalzang	Jammu and Kashmir
2007	Sonam Tshering Lepcha	Sikkim
2007	Thingbaijam Babu Singh	Manipur
2007	Valayapatti A. R. Subramaniam	Tamil Nadu
2007	Waman Thakre	Madhya Pradesh
2007	Geeta Chandran	Delhi
2007	Neelamani Devi	Manipur
2007	P. R. Thilagam	Tamil Nadu
2007	Pushpa Hans	Delhi
2007	Shanti Hiranand	Delhi
2007	Shashikala Jawalkar	Maharashtra
2008	Asha Bhosle	Maharashtra
2008	P. Susheela	Tamil Nadu
2008	Amar Nath Sehgal (Posthumous)	Delhi
2008	Sushil Kumar Saxena	Delhi
2008	Asad Ali Khan	Delhi
2008	Ustad Rahim Fahimuddin Khan Dagar	Delhi
2008	Helen Giri Syiem	Meghalaya
2008	Gokulotsavji Maharaj	Madhya Pradesh
2008	Sirkazhi G. Sivachidambaram	Tamil Nadu
2008	Moozhikkulam Kochukuttan Chakyar	Kerala
2008	Gennadi Mikhailovich Pechinkov	Russia
2008	Manoj N. Shyamalan	United States of America
2008	Pandit Pratap Pawar	United Kingdom
2008	Kochampilli Narayanan Nambiar	Kerala
2008	Yella Venkateswara Rao	Telangana
2008	Gangadhar Pradhan	Odisha
2008	Hans Raj Hans	Punjab
2008	Jatin Goswami	Assam
2008	Jawahar Wattal	Delhi
2008	John Martin Nelson	Chhattisgarh
2008	Jonnalagadda Gurappa Chetty	Andhra Pradesh
2008	Kekoo M. Gandhy	Maharashtra
2008	Mangala Prasad Mohanty	Jharkhand
2008	Tom Alter	Maharashtra
2008	Sabitri Heisnam	Manipur
2008	Madhuri Dixit	Maharashtra
2008	Meenakshi Chitharanjan	Tamil Nadu
2008	Sentila T. Yanger	Nagaland
2009	Pandit Bhimsen Gururaj Joshi	Maharashtra
2009	G. Krishna	Andhra Pradesh
2009	Vaidyanathan Ganapati Sthapati	Tamil Nadu
2009	R.C. Mehta	Gujarat
2009	V.P. Dhananjayan & Smt. Shanta Dhananjayan (Duo)	Tamil Nadu
2009	Shamshad Begum	Maharashtra
2009	Bhai Nirmal Singh 'Khalasa'	Punjab
2009	Leela Omchery	Delhi
2009	Ameena Ahmad Ahuja	Delhi
2009	Brahmanandam	Telangana
2009	Kiran Seth	Delhi
2009	Pratapaditya Pal	United States of America
2009	S. Krishnaswamy	Tamil Nadu
2009	Skendrowell Syiemlieh (Posthumous)	Meghalaya
2009	Tafazzul Ali (Posthumous)	Assam
2009	Geeta Kapur	Delhi
2009	Devayani	France
2009	Penaz Masani	Maharashtra
2009	Hridaynath Mangeshkar	Maharashtra
2009	A. Vivekh	Tamil Nadu
2009	Akshay Kumar Hariom Bhatia	Maharashtra
2009	Govind Ram Nirmalkar	Chhattisgarh
2009	Gurumayum Gourakishor Sharma	Manipur
2009	Hashmat Ullah Khan	Jammu and Kashmir
2009	Iravatham Mahadevan	Tamil Nadu
2009	K. P. Udayabhanu	Kerala
2009	Kalamandalam Gopi	Kerala
2009	Kumar Sanu	Maharashtra
2009	Mattannoor Sankarankutty Marar	Kerala
2009	Thilakan	Kerala
2009	Niranjan Goswami	West Bengal
2009	Prakash Narain Dubey	Maharashtra
2009	Ram Kishore Chhipa	Rajasthan
2009	Suresh Dutta	West Bengal
2009	Udit Narayan Jha	Maharashtra
2009	Aishwarya Rai Bachchan	Maharashtra
2009	Aruna Sairam	Tamil Nadu
2009	Helen Khan	Maharashtra
2009	Hemi Bawa	Delhi
2009	Shaoli Mitra	West Bengal

== 2010–2019 ==
Year	Name	State/Country
2010	Umayalpuram K. Sivaraman	Tamil Nadu
2010	Ebrahim Alkazi	Delhi
2010	Zohra Segal	Delhi
2010	Mallika Sarabhai	Gujarat
2010	Nookala Chinna Satyanarayana	Andhra Pradesh
2010	Pandit Puttaraj Kavi Gavaigalavaru	Karnataka
2010	Pandit Chhannulal Mishra	Uttar Pradesh
2010	Madhusudan Amilal Dhaky	Gujarat
2010	A. R. Rahman	Tamil Nadu
2010	Aamir Khan	Maharashtra
2010	Akbar Padamsee	Maharashtra
2010	Kuzhur Narayana Marar	Kerala
2010	Ilaiyaraaja	Tamil Nadu
2010	Ram Kumar	Delhi
2010	Shrinivas Vinayak Khale	Maharashtra
2010	Kumudini Lakhia	Gujarat
2010	Ustad Sultan Khan	Maharashtra
2010	Mukund Lath	Rajasthan
2010	Ram Dayal Munda	Jharkhand
2010	Shobha Raju	Andhra Pradesh
2010	Guru Mayadhar Raut	Delhi
2010	Carmel Berkson	Maharashtra
2010	Rekha Ganeshan	Maharashtra
2010	Raghunath Panigrahi	Odisha
2010	Pandit Ulhas Kashalkar	West Bengal
2010	Arjun Prajapati	Rajasthan
2010	Hari Uppal	Bihar
2010	K. Raghavan	Kerala
2010	Nemai Ghosh	West Bengal
2010	Rajkumar Achouba Singh	Manipur
2010	Resul Pookutty	Kerala
2010	Saif Ali Khan	Maharashtra
2010	Arundhati Nag	Karnataka
2010	Gul Bardhan	Madhya Pradesh
2010	Haobam Ongbi Ngangbi Devi	Manipur
2010	Sumitra Guha	Delhi
2010	Wasifuddin Dagar	Delhi
2011	Kapila Vatsyayan	Delhi
2011	Akkineni Nageswara Rao	Andhra Pradesh
2011	Homai Vyarawalla	Gujarat
2011	Rudrapatna Krishna Sastry Srikantan	Karnataka
2011	Arpita Singh	Delhi
2011	C. V. Chandrasekhar	Tamil Nadu
2011	Dashrath Patel (Posthumous)	Gujarat
2011	Dwijen Mukherjee	West Bengal
2011	Krishen Khanna	Haryana
2011	Madavoor Vasudevan Nair	Kerala
2011	Khayyam	Maharashtra
2011	S. P. Balasubrahmanyam	Tamil Nadu
2011	Satyadev Dubey	Maharashtra
2011	Shashi Kapoor	Maharashtra
2011	Waheeda Rehman	Maharashtra
2011	Girish Kasaravalli	Karnataka
2011	Neelam Mansingh Chowdhry	Chandigarh
2011	Tabu	Maharashtra
2011	S. R. Janakiraman	Tamil Nadu
2011	Ajoy Chakrabarty	West Bengal
2011	Dadi Pudumjee	Delhi
2011	Gajam Govardhana	Telangana
2011	Jayaram Subramaniam	Tamil Nadu
2011	Jivya Soma Mashe	Maharashtra
2011	Khangembam Mangi Singh	Manipur
2011	Makar Dhwaja Darogha	Jharkhand
2011	Peruvanam Kuttan Marar	Kerala
2011	Prahlad Tipanya	Madhya Pradesh
2011	Sahabzade Irrfan Ali Khan	Maharashtra
2011	Shaji Neelakantan Karun	Kerala
2011	Kajol	Maharashtra
2011	Kalamandalam Kshemavathy	Kerala
2011	M. K. Saroja	Tamil Nadu
2011	Mahasundari Devi	Bihar
2011	Sunayana Hazarilal	Maharashtra
2011	Usha Uthup	West Bengal
2012	Bhupen Hazarika (Posthumous)	Assam
2012	Kalpathi Ganapathi Subramanyan	Gujarat
2012	Mario de Miranda (Posthumous)	Goa
2012	T. V. Gopalakrishnan	Tamil Nadu
2012	Shabana Azmi	Maharashtra
2012	Anish Kapoor	United Kingdom
2012	Buddhadev Das Gupta	West Bengal
2012	Jatin Das	Delhi
2012	Khaled Choudhury	West Bengal
2012	M.S. Gopalakrishnan	Tamil Nadu
2012	Dharmendra Deol	Maharashtra
2012	Sunil Janah	United States of America
2012	Mira Nair	Delhi
2012	Minati Mishra	Odisha
2012	Laila Tyabji	Delhi
2012	Gopal Prasad Dubey	Jharkhand
2012	Anup Jalota	Maharashtra
2012	Kalamandalam Sivan Namboodiri	Kerala
2012	Mohanlal Chaturbhuj Kumhar	Rajasthan
2012	Moti Lal Kemmu	Jammu and Kashmir
2012	Na. Muthuswamy	Tamil Nadu
2012	Ramachandra Subraya Hegde Chittani	Karnataka
2012	Gundecha Brothers	Madhya Pradesh
2012	Sakar Khan	Rajasthan
2012	Satish Alekar	Maharashtra
2012	Shahid Parvez Khan	Maharashtra
2012	Priyadarsan	Tamil Nadu
2012	Vanraj Bhatia	Maharashtra
2012	Vijay Sharma	Himachal Pradesh
2012	Joy Michael	Delhi
2012	Nameirakpam Ibemni Devi	Manipur
2012	R. Nagarathnamma	Karnataka
2012	Yamunabai Waikar	Maharashtra
2013	Raghunath Mohapatra	Odisha
2013	S. H. Raza	Delhi
2013	D. Ramanaidu	Andhra Pradesh
2013	Saroja Vaidyanathan	Delhi
2013	Kanak Rele	Maharashtra
2013	Jaspal Singh Bhatti (Posthumous)	Chandigarh
2013	Rajesh Khanna (Posthumous)	Maharashtra
2013	Sharmila Tagore	Delhi
2013	Abdul Rashid Khan	West Bengal
2013	Mahrukh Tarapor	Maharashtra
2013	Suresh Talwalkar	Maharashtra
2013	Apurba Kishore Bir	Maharashtra
2013	Balwant Thakur	Jammu and Kashmir
2013	Brahmdeo Ram Pandit	Maharashtra
2013	Gajam Anjaiah	Andhra Pradesh
2013	Ghanakanta Bora	Assam
2013	Kailash Chandra Meher	Odisha
2013	Nana Patekar	Maharashtra
2013	P. Madhavan Nair (Madhu)	Kerala
2013	Pablo Bartholomew	Delhi
2013	Purna Chandra Das	West Bengal
2013	R. Nageswara Rao	Andhra Pradesh
2013	Rajendra Tiku	Jammu and Kashmir
2013	Ramesh Sippy	Maharashtra
2013	Bapu	Tamil Nadu
2013	S. Shakir Ali	Rajasthan
2013	B. Jayashree	Karnataka
2013	Hildamit Lepcha	Sikkim
2013	Jaymala Shiledar	Maharashtra
2013	Sridevi	Maharashtra
2013	Sudha Malhotra	Maharashtra
2013	G. C. D. Bharti	Chhattisgarh
2013	Ghulam Mohammad Saznawaz	Jammu and Kashmir
2014	Begum Parween Sultana	Maharashtra
2014	Gulam Mohammed Sheikh	Gujarat
2014	Kamal Haasan	Tamil Nadu
2014	T. H. Vinayakram	Tamil Nadu
2014	Sabitri Chatterjee	West Bengal
2014	Sooni Taraporevala	Maharashtra
2014	Supriya Devi	West Bengal
2014	Vidya Balan	Maharashtra
2014	Pandit Vijay Ghate	Maharashtra
2014	Biman Bihari Das	Delhi
2014	Kalamandalam Satyabhama	Kerala
2014	Anuj (Ramanuj) Sharma	Chhattisgarh
2014	Bansi Kaul	Delhi
2014	Mohammad Ali Baig	Telangana
2014	Musafir Ram Bhardwaj	Himachal Pradesh
2014	Paresh Maity	Delhi
2014	Paresh Rawal	Maharashtra
2014	Ram Mohan	Maharashtra
2014	Santosh Sivan	Tamil Nadu
2014	Sudarsan Pattnaik	Odisha
2014	Sunil Das	West Bengal
2014	Elam Endira Devi	Manipur
2014	Geeta Mahalik	Delhi
2014	Nayana Apte Joshi	Maharashtra
2014	Rani Karnaa	West Bengal
2014	Moinuddin Khan	Rajasthan
2015	Amitabh Bachchan	Maharashtra
2015	Dilip Kumar	Maharashtra
2015	Gokulotsavji Maharaj	Madhya Pradesh
2015	Jahnu Barua	Assam
2015	Sudha Ragunathan	Tamil Nadu
2015	Prafulla Kar	Odisha
2015	A. Kanyakumari	Tamil Nadu
2015	Kota Srinivasa Rao	Telangana
2015	Mahesh Raj Soni	Rajasthan
2015	Naresh Bedi	Delhi
2015	Neil Herbert Nongkynrih	Meghalaya
2015	Pran Kumar Sharma (Posthumous)	Delhi
2015	Prasoon Joshi	Maharashtra
2015	Rahul Jain	Delhi
2015	Ravindra Jain	Maharashtra
2015	Sanjay Leela Bhansali	Maharashtra
2015	Shekhar Sen	Maharashtra
2015	Tripti Mukherjee	United States of America
2016	Girija Devi	West Bengal
2016	Yamini Krishnamurti	Delhi
2016	Rajinikanth	Tamil Nadu
2016	Anupam Kher	Maharashtra
2016	Heisnam Kanhailal	Manipur
2016	Ram Vanji Sutar	Uttar Pradesh
2016	Udit Narayan Jha	Maharashtra
2016	Soma Ghosh	Uttar Pradesh
2016	Priyanka Chopra	Maharashtra
2016	Tulsidas Borkar	Maharashtra
2016	Venkatesh Kumar	Karnataka
2016	Ajay Devgn	Maharashtra
2016	Bhalchandra Dattatray Mondhe	Madhya Pradesh
2016	Bhikhudan Gadhvi	Gujarat
2016	Jai Prakash Lakhiwal	Delhi
2016	Kalal Laxma Goud	Telangana
2016	Madhur Bhandarkar	Maharashtra
2016	Michael Postel	France
2016	Naresh Chander Lal	Andaman And Nicobar Islands
2016	Nila Madhab Panda	Delhi
2016	Prakash Chand Surana (Posthumous)	Rajasthan
2016	S. S. Rajamouli	Karnataka
2016	Saeed Jaffrey (Posthumous)	United Kingdom
2016	Sribhas Chandra Supakar	Uttar Pradesh
2016	Gulabi Sapera	Rajasthan
2016	Malini Awasthi	Uttar Pradesh
2016	Mamta Chandrakar	Chhattisgarh
2016	Pratibha Prahlad	Delhi
2017	K. J. Yesudas	Kerala
2017	Vishwa Mohan Bhatt	Rajasthan
2017	Aekka Yadagiri Rao	Telangana
2017	Kailash Kher	Maharashtra
2017	Sadhu Meher	Odisha
2017	Tilak Gitai	Rajasthan
2017	Chemancheri Kunhiraman Nair	Kerala
2017	Jitendra Haripal	Odisha
2017	Krishna Ram Chaudhary	Uttar Pradesh
2017	Laishram Birendrakumar Singh	Manipur
2017	Mukund Nayak	Jharkhand
2017	Purushottam Upadhyay	Maharashtra
2017	T. K. Murthy	Tamil Nadu
2017	Wareppa Naba	Manipur
2017	Anuradha Paudwal	Maharashtra
2017	Aruna Mohanty	Odisha
2017	Baua Devi	Bihar
2017	Basanti Bisht	Uttarakhand
2017	Bharathi Vishnuvardhan	Karnataka
2017	Parassala B. Ponnammal	Kerala
2017	Sukri Bommagowda	Karnataka
2018	Ilaiyaraaja	Tamil Nadu
2018	Ustad Ghulam Mustafa Khan	Maharashtra
2018	Laxman Pai	Goa
2018	Arvind Parikh	Maharashtra
2018	Sharda Sinha	Bihar
2018	Yogendra	Uttar Pradesh
2018	Mohan Swaroop Bhatia	Uttar Pradesh
2018	L.Subadani Devi	Manipur
2018	Doddarangegowda	Karnataka
2018	Manoj Joshi	Maharashtra
2018	Pran Kishore Kaul	Jammu and Kashmir
2018	Vijay Kumar Kichlu	West Bengal
2018	Pravakar Maharana	Odisha
2018	Sissir Purushottam Mishra	Maharashtra
2018	Vijayalakshmi Navaneetha Krishnan	Tamil Nadu
2018	Gobardhan Panika	Odisha
2018	R. Sathyanarayana	Karnataka
2018	Bhajju Shyam	Madhya Pradesh
2018	Ibrahim Sutar	Karnataka
2018	Rudrapatnam Narayanaswamy Tharanathan and Shri Rudrapatnam Narayanaswamy Thyagarajan (Duo)	Karnataka
2018	Datuk Ramli Ibrahim	Malaysia
2018	Bapak Nyoman Nuarta	Indonesia
2019	Bhupendra Kumar Hazarika (Posthumous)	Assam
2019	Dr.(Smt.)Teejan Bai	Chhattisgarh
2019	Babasaheb alias Balwant Moreshwar Purandare	Maharashtra
2019	Budhaditya Mukherjee	West Bengal
2019	Viswanathan Mohanlal	Kerala
2019	Rajeshwar Acharya	Uttar Pradesh
2019	Manoj Bajpayee	Maharashtra
2019	Pritam Bhartwan	Uttarakhand
2019	Jyoti Manshanker Bhatt	Gujarat
2019	Swapan Chaudhuri	United States of America
2019	Dinyar R Contractor	Maharashtra
2019	Thanga Darlong	Tripura
2019	Prabhu Deva	Tamil Nadu
2019	Godawari Dutta	Bihar
2019	Joravarsinh Danubhai Jadav	Gujarat
2019	Fayaz Ahmad Jan	Jammu and Kashmir
2019	Kadamputharamadom Gopalan Thanthri Jayan	Kerala
2019	Waman Kendre	Maharashtra
2019	Kader Khan (Posthumous)	Canada
2019	Abdul Gaful Khatri	Gujarat
2019	Shankar Mahadevan	Maharashtra
2019	Narthaki Nataraj	Tamil Nadu
2019	Anup Ranjan Pandey	Chhattisgarh
2019	Anup Sah	Uttarakhand
2019	Milena Salvini	France
2019	Sirivennela Seetharama Sastry Chembolu	Telangana
2019	Anandan Sivamani	Tamil Nadu
2019	Rajeev Taranath	Karnataka
2019	Heera Lal Yadav	Uttar Pradesh

== 2020–2029 ==
Year	Name	State/Country
2020	Pandit Chhannulal Mishra	Uttar Pradesh
2020	Pandit Ajoy Chakrabarty	West Bengal
2020	Shashadhar Acharya	Jharkhand
2020	Indira P. P. Bora	Assam
2020	Madan Singh Chauhan	Chhattisgarh
2020	Lalitha Chidambaram and Smt. Saroja Chidambaram (Duo)	Tamil Nadu
2020	Deshabandu (Dr.) Vajira Chitrasena	Sri Lanka
2020	Purushottam Dadheech (Puru Dadheech)	Madhya Pradesh
2020	Utsav Charan Das	Odisha
2020	Manohar Devadoss	Tamil Nadu
2020	Yadla Gopala Rao	Andhra Pradesh
2020	Mitrabhanu Gountia	Odisha
2020	Madhu Mansuri Hasmukh	Jharkhand
2020	Shanti Jain (Posthumous)	Bihar
2020	Karan Johar	Maharashtra
2020	Sarita Joshi	Maharashtra
2020	Ekta Kapoor	Maharashtra
2020	Yazdi Naoshirwan Karanjia	Gujarat
2020	V. K. Munusamy	Puducherry
2020	Manmohan Mahapatra (Posthumous)	Odisha
2020	Ustad Anwar Khan Mangniyar	Rajasthan
2020	Munna Master	Rajasthan
2020	Pandit Manilal Nag	West Bengal
2020	Pankajakshi M.S.	Kerala
2020	Kangana Ranaut	Maharashtra
2020	Dalavayi Chalapathi Rao	Andhra Pradesh
2020	Adnan Sami Khan	Maharashtra
2020	Shyam Sunder Sharma	Bihar
2020	Daya Prakash Sinha	Uttar Pradesh
2020	Kaleeshabi Mahaboob and Shri Sheik Mahaboob Subhani (Duo)	Tamil Nadu
2020	Suresh Wadkar	Maharashtra
2021	S. P. Balasubrahmanyam (Posthumous)	Tamil Nadu
2021	Sudarshan Sahoo	Odisha
2021	Krishnan Nair Shantakumari Chithra	Kerala
2021	Ustad Gulfam Ahmed	Uttar Pradesh
2021	Annavarapu Ramaswamy	Andhra Pradesh
2021	Subbu Arumugam	Tamil Nadu
2021	Bhuri Bai	Madhya Pradesh
2021	Radheshyam Barle	Chhattisgarh
2021	Biren Kumar Basak	West Bengal
2021	Peter Brook	United Kingdom
2021	Gopiram Bargayn Burabhakat	Assam
2021	Narayan Debnath	West Bengal
2021	Dulari Devi	Bihar
2021	Hanjabam Ongbi Radhe Sharmi	Manipur
2021	(Dr.) I. Wayan Dibia	Indonesia
2021	Parshuram Vishram Gangavane	Maharashtra
2021	Purnamasi Jani	Odisha
2021	Matha B. Manjamma Jogati	Karnataka
2021	Kaithapram Damodaran Namboothiri	Kerala
2021	Mahesh Kumar Kanodia (Posthumous) and Shri Naresh Kanodia (Posthumous) (Duo)	Gujarat
2021	K Kesavasamy	Puducherry
2021	Haji Ghulam Rasool Khan	Jammu and Kashmir
2021	Lakha Khan Manganiar	Rajasthan
2021	Sanjida Khatun	Bangladesh
2021	Vinayak Vishnu Khedekar	Goa
2021	Lajwanti	Punjab
2021	Ramachandra Manjhi	Bihar
2021	Dulal Manki	Assam
2021	Guru Rewben Mashangva	Manipur
2021	K K Ramachandra Pulavar	Kerala
2021	Kanaka Raju	Telangana
2021	Bombay Jayashri	Tamil Nadu
2021	Maitya Ram Reang	Tripura
2021	Kartar Singh	Punjab
2021	Kartar Singh Sonkhle	Himachal Pradesh
2021	K C Sivasankar (Posthumous)	Tamil Nadu
2021	Dandamudi Sumathi Rama Mohan Rao	Andhra Pradesh
2022	Prabha Atre	Maharashtra
2022	Victor Banerjee	West Bengal
2022	Gurmeet Bawa (Posthumous)	Punjab
2022	Rashid Khan	Uttar Pradesh
2022	Kamalini Asthana and Ms. Nalini Asthana (Duo)	Uttar Pradesh
2022	Madhuri Barthwal	Uttarakhand
2022	Pandit (Dr.) S. Ballesh Bhajantri	Tamil Nadu
2022	Khandu Wangchuk Bhutia	Sikkim
2022	Sulochana Chavan	Maharashtra
2022	Lourembam Bino Devi	Manipur
2022	Shyamamani Devi	Odisha
2022	Arjun Singh Dhurwey	Madhya Pradesh
2022	Chandraprakash Dwivedi	Rajasthan
2022	Gosaveedu Shaik Hassan Sahieb (Posthumous)	Andhra Pradesh
2022	Sowcar Janaki	Tamil Nadu
2022	H. R. Keshavamurthy	Karnataka
2022	Pandit Shivnath Mishra	Uttar Pradesh
2022	Darshanam Mogilaiah	Telangana
2022	Kongampattu A. V. Murugaiyan	Puducherry
2022	R Muthukkannammal	Tamil Nadu
2022	Tsering Namgyal	Ladakh
2022	A. K. C. Natarajan	Tamil Nadu
2022	Sonu Nigam	Maharashtra
2022	Ram Sahay Pandey	Madhya Pradesh
2022	Sheesh Ram	Uttar Pradesh
2022	Sakini Ramachandraiah	Telangana
2022	Gaddam Padmaja Reddy	Telangana
2022	Pandit Ram Dayal Sharma	Rajasthan
2022	Kaajee Singh 'Vidyaarthee'	West Bengal
2022	Konsam Ibomcha Singh	Manipur
2022	Ajita Srivastava	Uttar Pradesh
2022	Lalita Vakil	Himachal Pradesh
2022	Durga Bai Vyam	Madhya Pradesh
2023	Zakir Hussain	Maharashtra
2023	Vani Jairam (Posthumous)	Tamil Nadu
2023	Suman Kalyanpur	Maharashtra
2023	Jodhaiya Bai Baiga	Madhya Pradesh
2023	Premjit Baria	Dadra And Nagar Haveli and Daman and Diu
2023	Usha Barle	Chhattisgarh
2023	Hemant Chauhan	Gujarat
2023	Bhanubhai Chunilal Chitara	Gujarat
2023	Hemoprova Chutia	Assam
2023	Subhadra Devi	Bihar
2023	Hem Chandra Goswami	Assam
2023	Pritikana Goswami	West Bengal
2023	Ustad Ahmed Hussain and Ustad Mohd Hussain (Duo)	Rajasthan
2023	Dilshad Hussain	Uttar Pradesh
2023	Mahipatrai Kavi	Gujarat
2023	Marakathamani Keeravaani	Andhra Pradesh
2023	Parshuram Komaji Khune	Maharashtra
2023	Maguni Charan Kuanr	Odisha
2023	Domar Singh Kunvar	Chhattisgarh
2023	Risingbor Kurkalang	Meghalaya
2023	Iymudiyanda Rani Machaiah	Karnataka
2023	Ajay Kumar Mandavi	Chhattisgarh
2023	Pindipapanahalli Munivenkatappa	Karnataka
2023	Ramesh Parmar and Smt. Shanti Parmar (Duo)	Madhya Pradesh
2023	Krishna Patel	Odisha
2023	Guru Thiruvidaimarudur Kuppiah Kalyanasundaram	Tamil Nadu
2023	Kapil Dev Prasad	Bihar
2023	Shah Rasheed Ahmed Quadri	Karnataka
2023	Chintalapati Venkatapathi Raju	Andhra Pradesh
2023	Paresh Rathwa	Gujarat
2023	Mangala Kanti Roy	West Bengal
2023	K C Runremsangi	Mizoram
2023	Pandit (Dr.) Ritwik Sanyal	Uttar Pradesh
2023	Kota Satchidananda Sastry	Andhra Pradesh
2023	Kakchingtabam Shanathoiba Sharma	Manipur
2023	Neihunuo Sorhie	Nagaland
2023	Moa Subong	Nagaland
2023	Raveena Tandon	Maharashtra
2023	Coomi Nariman Wadia	Maharashtra
2023	Ghulam Muhammad Zaz	Jammu and Kashmir
2024	Vyjayantimala	Tamil Nadu
2024	Konidela Chiranjeevi	Andhra Pradesh
2024	Padma Subrahmanyam	Tamil Nadu
2024	Mithun Chakraborty	West Bengal
2024	Rajdutt	Maharashtra
2024	Pyarelal Ramprasad Sharma	Maharashtra
2024	Usha Uthup	West Bengal
2024	Vijaykanth (Posthumous)	Tamil Nadu
2024	Khalil Ahamad	Uttar Pradesh
2024	M. Badrappan	Tamil Nadu
2024	Kaluram Bamniya	Madhya Pradesh
2024	(Dr.) Rezwana Choudhury Bannya	Bangladesh
2024	Naseem Bano	Uttar Pradesh
2024	Ramlal Bareth	Chhattisgarh
2024	Gita Ray Barman	West Bengal
2024	Som Datt Battu	Himachal Pradesh
2024	Takdira Begam	West Bengal
2024	Drona Bhuyan	Assam
2024	Ashok Kumar Biswas	Bihar
2024	Smriti Rekha Chakma	Tripura
2024	Velu Anandachari	Telangana
2024	Ghulam Nabi Dar	Jammu and Kashmir
2024	Mahabir Singh Guddu	Haryana
2024	Anupama Hoskere	Karnataka
2024	Janki Lal Bhand	Rajasthan
2024	Ratan Kahar	West Bengal
2024	Dasari Kondappa	Telangana
2024	Jorden Lepcha	Sikkim
2024	Binod Maharana	Odisha
2024	Daliparthi Umamaheshwari	Telangana
2024	Pandit Ram Kumar Mallick	Bihar
2024	Pandit Surendra Mohan Mishra (Posthumous)	Uttar Pradesh
2024	Ali Mohammed and Shri Ghani Mohammed (Duo)	Rajasthan
2024	Kiran Nadar	Delhi
2024	Narayanan E. P.	Kerala
2024	Bhagabat Padhan	Odisha
2024	Sanatan Rudra Pal	West Bengal
2024	Binod Kumar Pasayat	Odisha
2024	Silbi Passah	Meghalaya
2024	Shanti Devi and Shri Shivan Paswan (Duo)	Bihar
2024	Romalo Ram	Jammu and Kashmir
2024	Nirmal Rishi	Punjab
2024	Pran Sabharwal	Punjab
2024	Gaddam Sammaiah	Telangana
2024	Machihan Sasa	Manipur
2024	Pandit Omprakash Sharma	Madhya Pradesh
2024	Godawari Singh	Uttar Pradesh
2024	Seshampatti Thirthagiri Sivalingam	Tamil Nadu
2024	Urmila Srivastava	Uttar Pradesh
2024	Nepal Chandra Sutradhar (Posthumous)	West Bengal
2024	Guru Gopinath Swain	Odisha
2024	Pandit Shri Laxman Bhatt Tailang (Posthumous)	Rajasthan
2024	Jagdish Trivedi	Gujarat
2024	Sadanam Puthiyaveetil Balakrishnan	Kerala
2024	Baburam Yadav	Uttar Pradesh
2025	Kumudini Lakhia	Gujarat
2025	Lakshminarayana Subramaniam	Karnataka
2025	Sharda Sinha (Posthumous)	Bihar
2025	Anant Nag	Karnataka
2025	Jatin Goswami	Assam
2025	Nandamuri Balakrishna	Andhra Pradesh
2025	Pankaj Udhas (Posthumous)	Maharashtra
2025	S Ajith Kumar	Tamil Nadu
2025	Shekhar Kapur	Maharashtra
2025	Shobana Chandrakumar	Tamil Nadu
2025	Adwaita Charan Gadanayak	Odisha
2025	Achyut Ramchandra Palav	Maharashtra
2025	Arijit Singh	West Bengal
2025	Ashok Saraf	Maharashtra
2025	Ashwini Bhide-Deshpande	Maharashtra
2025	Barry Godfray John	Delhi
2025	Begam Batool	Rajasthan
2025	Bharat Gupt	Delhi
2025	Bheru Singh Chouhan	Madhya Pradesh
2025	Bhimavva Doddabalappa Shillekyathara	Karnataka
2025	Durga Charan Ranbir	Odisha
2025	Farooq Ahmad Mir	Jammu and Kashmir
2025	Gokul Chandra Das	West Bengal
2025	Guruvayur Dorai	Tamil Nadu
2025	Harchandan Singh Bhatty	Madhya Pradesh
2025	Harjinder Singh Srinagar Wale	Punjab
2025	Hassan Raghu	Karnataka
2025	Jaspinder Narula	Maharashtra
2025	Joynacharan Bathari	Assam
2025	K Omanakutty Amma	Kerala
2025	Madugula Nagaphani Sarma	Andhra Pradesh
2025	Mahabir Nayak	Jharkhand
2025	Mamata Shankar	West Bengal
2025	Miriyala Apparao (Posthumous)	Andhra Pradesh
2025	Naren Gurung	Sikkim
2025	Nirmala Devi	Bihar
2025	P Datchanamoorthy	Puducherry
2025	Pandi Ram Mandavi	Chhattisgarh
2025	Parmar Lavjibhai Nagjibhai	Gujarat
2025	Purisai Kannappa Sambandan	Tamil Nadu
2025	Radhakrishnan Devasenapathy	Tamil Nadu
2025	Ranendra Bhanu Majumdar	Maharashtra
2025	Ratan Kumar Parimoo	Gujarat
2025	Reba Kanta Mahanta	Assam
2025	Ricky Kej	Karnataka
2025	Shyam Bihari Agrawal	Uttar Pradesh
2025	Tejendra Narayan Majumdar	West Bengal
2025	Thiyam Suryamukhi Devi	Manipur
2025	Vasudeo Kamath	Maharashtra
2025	Velu Aasaan	Tamil Nadu
2025	Venkappa Ambaji Sugatekar	Karnataka
2026	Anil Kumar Rastogi	Uttar Pradesh
2026	Arvind Vaidya	Gujarat
2026	Bharat Singh Bharti	Bihar
2026	Bhiklya Ladakya Dhinda	Maharashtra
2026	Bishwa Bandhu (Posthumous)	Odisha
2026	Chiranji Lal Yadav	Uttar Pradesh
2026	Deepika Reddy	Telangana
2026	Dharmiklal Chunilal Pandya	Gujarat
2026	Rajendra Prasad	Andhra Pradesh
2026	Gafruddin Mewati Jogi	Rajasthan
2026	Garimella Balakrishna Prasad (Posthumous)	Andhra Pradesh
2026	Ranjani–Gayatri (Duo)	Tamil Nadu
2026	Hari Madhab Mukhopadhyay (Posthumous)	West Bengal
2026	Haricharan Saikia	Assam
2026	Jyotish Debnath	West Bengal
2026	Vimala Menon	Kerala
2026	Kumar Bose	West Bengal
2026	Lars-Christian Koch	Germany
2026	R. Madhavan	Maharashtra
2026	Murali Mohan	Andhra Pradesh
2026	Mir Hajibhai Kasambhai	Gujarat
2026	Nuruddin Ahmed	Assam
2026	Othuvar Thiruthani Swaminathan	Tamil Nadu
2026	Pokhila Lekthepi	Assam
2026	Prosenjit Chatterjee	West Bengal
2026	R Krishnan (Posthumous)	Tamil Nadu
2026	Raghuveer Tukaram Khedkar	Maharashtra
2026	Rajastapathi Kaliappa Goundar	Tamil Nadu
2026	Sangyusang S Pongener	Nagaland
2026	Sarat Kumar Patra	Odisha
2026	Satish Shah	Maharashtra
2026	Simanchal Patro	Odisha
2026	Taga Ram Bheel	Rajasthan
2026	Tarun Bhattacharya	West Bengal
2026	Thiruvarur Bakthavathsalam	Tamil Nadu
2026	Tripti Mukherjee	West Bengal
2026	Yumnam Jatra Singh (Posthumous)	Manipur
