= S. R. Janakiraman =

Indian vocalist (1928-2026)

- Born: S. Rangasamy Janakiraman; 12 July 1928; Lalgudi, Madras Presidency, British India
- Died: 4 September 2026 (aged 98); Chennai, Tamil Nadu, India
- Occupation: Carnatic vocalist

S. Rangasamy Janakiraman (12 July 1928 – 4 September 2026) was an Indian Carnatic vocalist and musicologist.

== Life and career ==
Janakiraman started learning music in 1938. His big breakthrough came in 1945 when he joined Kalakshetra and learned music under the guidance of Tiger Varadachari, Budalur Krishnamurthy Sastri, T. K. Ramasami Ayyangar and Kalpagam Swaminathan. He also learned from Musiri Subramanya Ayyar and T Brinda. He was initiated into musicology by P. Sambamurthi and Balakrishna Ayya. Janakiraman died on 4 September 2026, at the age of 98.

== Publications ==
- Sangita Sampradaya Pradarshini – English translation of Lakshana Sangraha and Pracina Paddhati, 2010
- Sangita Shastra Saramu – A musicology text in Telugu
- Raga Lakshanas – A publication of the Music Academy Madras
- Ragas of Saramrta – A publication of the Music Academy Madras
- Essentials of Musicology – A short concise text dealing with the key elements of musicology
- Lakshana Gitas – Editor – A publication of the Music Academy Madras
- Ragas at a glance – A publication of Carnatica

== Papers ==
- The significance of the divisions of Pallavi, Anupallavi and Caranam JMAM
- Desi Suladi of Annamacarya, JMAM
- Pratimadhyama and its evolution, JMAM

== Audio Visual Presentations ==
- Varnas through the ages
- 72-Mela ragamalika of Mahavaidhyanatha Iyer
- Pearls of South Indian Ragas — A CD from Brhaddhvani

== Awards ==
- Recipient of Sangita Kala Acharya in 1997 (The Music Academy).
- Kalaimamani Award - 1998
- Recipient of Padma Shri in 2011.

== Sources ==
- Ragas at a Glance, Biography of the author
- Essentials of Musicology, Biography of the author
