= Shyam Bihari Agrawal =

Indian artist and writer (born 1942)

- Born: 1942 (age 83–84); Sirsa, Prayagraj, Uttar Pradesh, India
- Education: Government College of Art and Craft, Kolkata; University of Allahabad
- Occupations: Artist, writer, art Historian
- Employers: Allahabad University (retired); Prayag Sangeet Samiti (Dean)
- Awards: Padma Shri (2025); Indu Rakshita Award (1965)

Shyam Bihari Agrawal is an Indian artist, writer, and former academic from Prayagraj, Uttar Pradesh. In 2025, he was honoured with the Padma Shri by the Government of India for his contributions to the field of arts.

== Early life and education ==
Agrawal was born in 1942 in Sirsa. Prayagraj (formerly Allahabad), Uttar Pradesh. After completing his early education locally, he earned a five-year postgraduate diploma from the Government College of Art and Craft, Kolkata, which he completed on 4 January 1968. He was mentored by painter Kshitindranath Mazumdar.

In 1979, he received a Doctor of Philosophy (D.Phil.) degree from University of Allahabad for his dissertation titled “Bharatiya Chitrakala Mein Reetikaleen Sahitya Ki Abivyakti”, which explored how classical Hindi literature is reflected in Indian painting.

== Career ==
Agrawal began his academic career in 1968 as a lecturer in the Department of Painting at Allahabad University. He taught there for 35 years before retiring in 2003. After retirement, he joined Prayag Sangeet Samiti in Prayagraj where he established the Faculty of Visual Arts and served as Dean. He was also a visiting professor at Indira Kala Sangeet Vishwavidyalaya in Khairagarh.

Throughout his career, he participated in art workshops and seminars organized by institutions including Lalit Kala Akademi and various museums and universities. He was nominated as a member of the State Academy of Fine Arts in Lucknow, where he contributed to art education and edited the academy’s publication Kala Trimasik. He also wrote a monograph on Kshitindranath Mazumdar, which was published by the academy.

Agrawal has served on academic and research committees of universities such as Mahatma Gandhi Chitrakoot Gramodaya Vishwavidyalaya and Kanpur University.

== Awards and recognition ==
Agarwal received the Indu Rakshita Award in 1965 for his painting Veni Gunthan in the Mewar style, and was honoured with the Padma Shri in 2025 in the Arts category.
