= Mahrukh Tarapor =

Indian museum professional

- Born: 1946 (age 79–80); Mumbai, India
- Occupation: Art consultant
- Awards: Padma Shri

Mahrukh Tarapor is an Indian museum professional and art consultant, known for her scholarship in museum art, especially Islamic art. She was honoured by the Government of India, in 2013, by bestowing on her the Padma Shri, the fourth highest civilian award, for her contributions to the field of art.

== Early life & education ==
Mahrukh Tarapor is one of the most widely respected museum professionals in the world, says Philippe de Montebello, former Metropolitan Museum of Art director, and talks about her diplomatic skills, knowledge and energy.

Mahrukh Tarapor was born in Mumbai to a Parsi family, in 1946. She secured a doctorate from Harvard University and started her career by joining Metropolitan Museum, New York, in 1983.

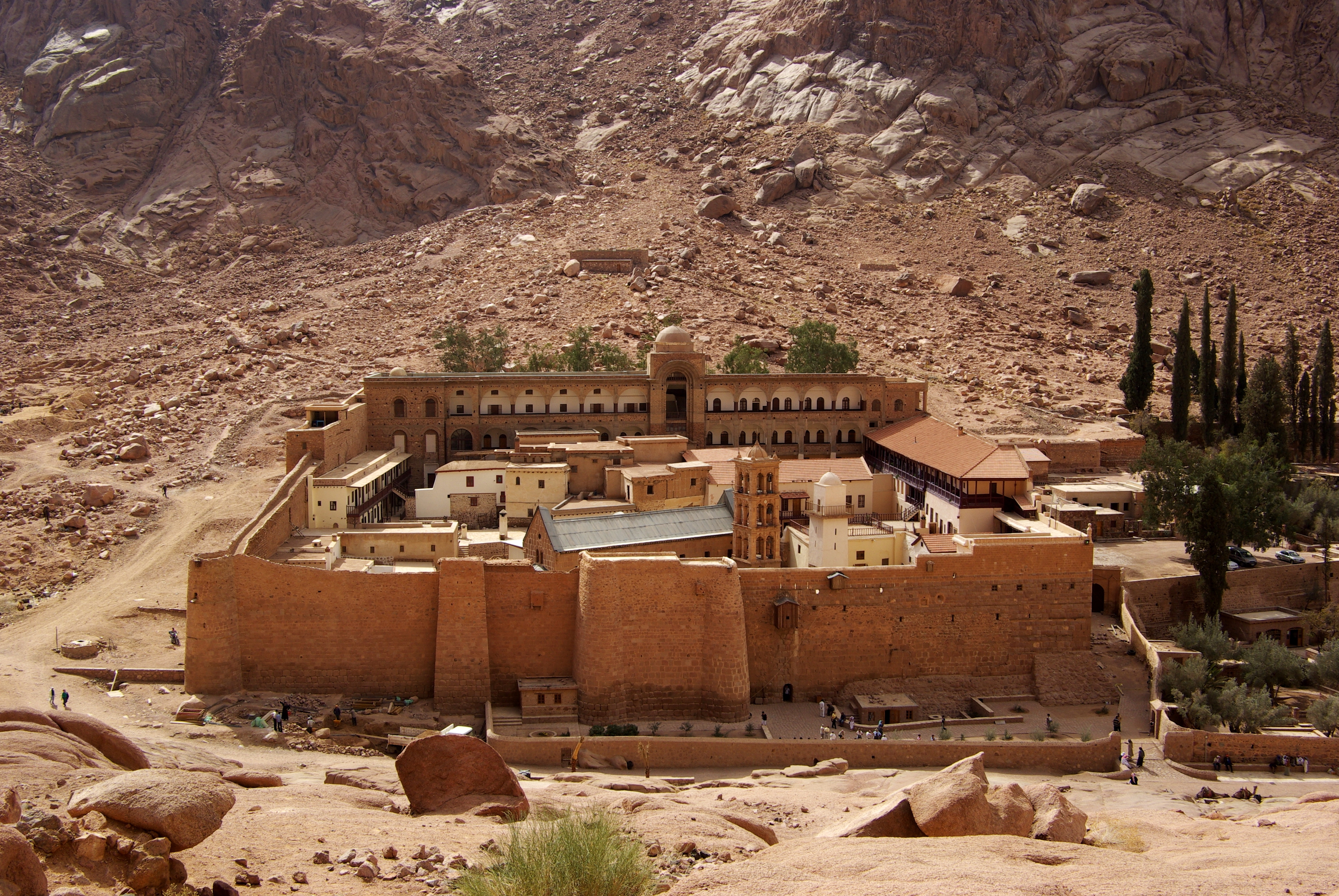
St. Catherine's Monastery

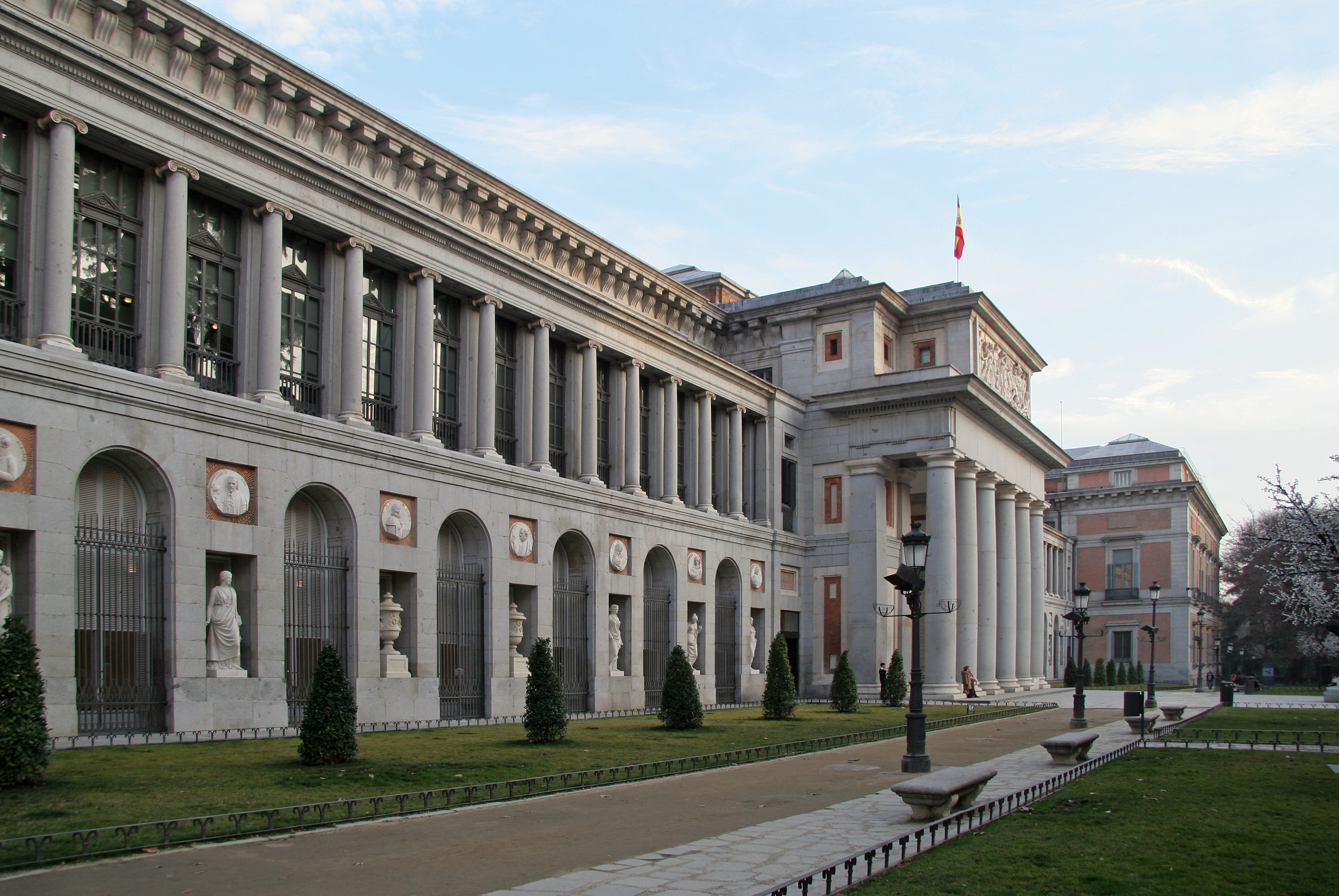
Museo del Prado, Madrid

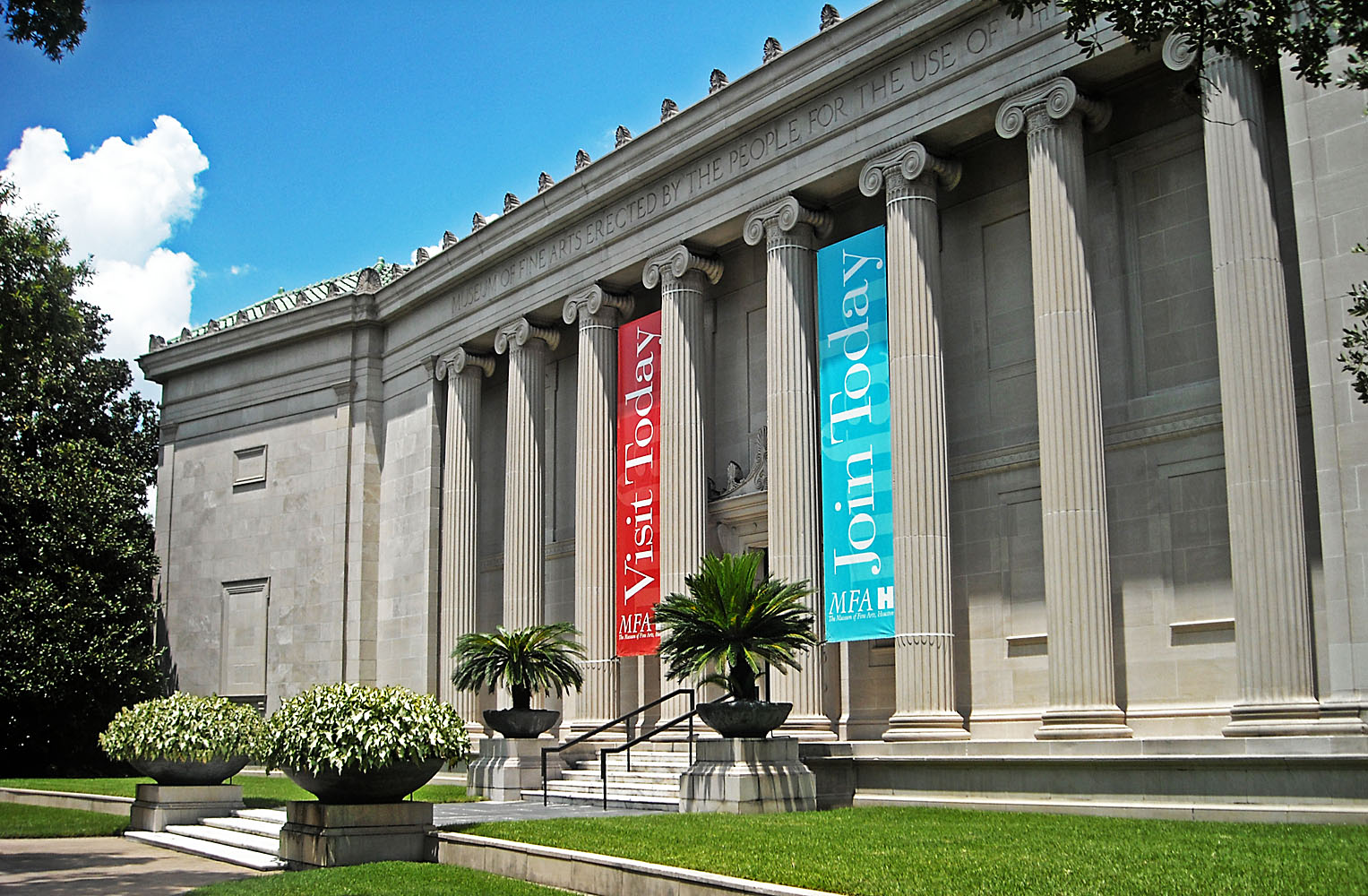
Museum of Fine Arts, Houston – Watkin building

== Career ==
Tarapor over the course of a decade, rose through ranks to reach the level of the Associate Director for Exhibitions. During her stint at the Met Museum, she negotiated with the governments of Spain, Morocco and Egypt which led to the exhibition of Al-Andalus: The Art of Islamic Spain, staged in Alhambra in Granada, the conservation of the Minbar from the Kutubiyya Mosque at the Badi Palace, Marrakesh and the setting up of exhibition galleries at the Saint Catherine's Monastery, Sinai. She is also credited with efforts to raise loans for many intercultural exhibitions such as the Glory of Byzantium (1997), Byzantium: Faith and Power(2004), Art of the First Cities (2003) and Beyond Babylon (2009).

Tarapor was promoted as the Director, International Affairs, at the Met's international affairs office at Geneva, in 2006, and worked in that capacity till 2009, when she retired after 25 years of service to continue her career as a consultant. During this period, she was in regular touch with the governments of many European countries, the Middle East, Australia and Asia, for the exchange and dissemination of information. Mahrukh Tarapor has also contributed to the organization of several international art exhibitions such as:

- Egyptian Art in the Age of the Pyramids
- Art of the First Cities: The Third Millennium B.C. from the Mediterranean to the Indus
- China: Dawn of a Golden Age, 200–750 A.D.
- The Crown of Bohemia 1347–1437, Prague
- Trade and Diplomacy of the Second Millennium BC (2008)
- Art of Medieval Spain

After retiring from Met Museum, she was offered the post as the Head of the National Museum of India, an offer she, reportedly, declined, opting for a career as a consultant. In 2012, the Museum of Fine Arts, Houston, hired the consultative services of Dr. Tarapor, in the areas of exchange of art, staff and scholarly study. She is also attending to the expansion of Islamic Arts programmes of MFAH as also in procuring loans for various MFAH exhibitions, utilizing her connections.

Tarapor lives in Mumbai and Geneva, attending to her duties as a consultant for the Museum of Fine Arts, Houston, Museo del Prado and her assignments as a consultant to the Government of India.

== Positions ==
Mahrukh Tarapor has served in many positions of importance. Apart from her career postings as the associate Director of Exhibitions and the Director of International Affairs with the Metropolitan Museum, New York, she has also held the posts of:

- Member – International advisory board of the Sakip Sabanci Museum, Istanbul.
- Member – Board of directors of the American Associates of the Saint Catherine Foundation.
- Former member (1992–2009) – Bizot Group, a congregation of the directors of some of the leading museums in the world.
- Jury Member – Rolex Awards for Enterprise – 2012
- Senior Advisor for International Initiatives – Museum of Fine Arts, Houston
- Board Member – The Silk Road Project Inc
- Board Member – Saint Catherine Foundation
- Member – Museum Reforms Committee – Government of India

== Awards and recognitions ==
Mahrukh Tarapor has been honoured by many governments such as France, Morocco and Spain. In 2013, the Government of India honoured her with the fourth highest civilian award, Padma Shri.

== Publications ==
Tarapor has published two works on Islamic and Indian arts.

- Tarapor, Mahrukh. Islamic calligraphy. Asia Society. OCLC 6602824.
- Tarapor, Mahrukh. Art and empire the discovery of India in art and literature, 1851–1947. Keki. OCLC 14920523.

== See also ==
- Metropolitan Museum of Art
- Saint Catherine's Monastery
- Museum of Fine Arts, Houston
