= Jagdish Trivedi =

Indian author

Jagdish Labhshanker Trivedi
- Born: Wadhwan, Surendranagar district, Gujarat, India
- Occupations: Humorist; author; poet; actor; philosopher
- Known for: Mastery of the Dairo art form, Philanthropy
- Awards: Padma Shri in 2024
- Website: drjagdishtrivedi.in

Jagdish Labhshanker Trivedi is an Indian humorist, author, poet, actor, and philosopher, recognised for his contributions to Gujarati culture through the traditional art form of Dairo. Born in Wadhwan, Surendranagar district, Gujarat, Trivedi has performed worldwide with over 3,000 shows in 30 countries over the past three decades.

== Early life and education ==
Despite facing academic challenges during his high school years, failing his 11th and 12th standard exams, Trivedi later earned three PhD degrees.

== Career ==
Trivedi performs in the Dairo tradition, a Gujarati style of comedy. His extensive career has not only contributed to popularising this art form but has also bridged cultural gaps, bringing Gujarati humour to a global audience.

== Philanthropy ==
Trivedi has donated a significant portion of his earnings from performances and writings to charitable causes, with a focus on improving medical and educational facilities for the underprivileged.

== Awards and recognition ==
In 2024, Trivedi was honoured with the Padma Shri, India's fourth-highest civilian award, for his outstanding contribution to the arts and society.
