= Anupama Hoskere =

Indian puppeteer

- Born: 20 December 1964 (age 61); Bengaluru, Karnataka
- Occupation: Puppeteer
- Known for: Indian classical string puppetry
- Spouse: Vidyashankar Hoskere
- Children: 3
- Awards: Sangeet Natak Akademi Award (2018); Padma Shri (2024)

Anupama Hoskere is a puppeteer from the Indian state of Karnataka. A recipient of Senior Fellowship in Puppetry from the Ministry of Culture, Government of India, she also received many awards and honors including the Sangeet Natak Akademi Award for puppetry, and Padma Shri in arts.

== Biography ==
Anupama was born on 20 December 1964, in Bengaluru, Karnataka. She began training in Carnatic music and Bharatanatyam dance at a very young age. She has trained in Bharatanatyam under the late Guru Narmada and the late V.S. Kaushik.

Anupama who graduated with a Bachelor of Engineering degree from B.M.S. College of Engineering in 1987, completed two post graduate degrees, M.E. in Communication Engineering and M.S. in Electrical and Computer Engineering from California State University, Long Beach, in 1993. After completing Masters, she worked for a while at an IT company in the United States.

Anupama studied traditional Karnataka string puppetry from Guru M.R. Ranganatha Rao. When she came to study, Rao was initially skeptical about whether a middle-class mother who had studied abroad would be suitable for learning puppetry, but later, understanding her interest further, he agreed to teach her how to perform puppet shows and later how to carve wooden puppets. Later, in 2011,she and her husband conducted a puppet-making workshop in Prague with Miroslav Trejtnar to learn Czech marionette carving, jointing and stringing techniques.

=== Personal life ===
Anupama and her husband Vidyashankar Hoskere have three children, Prakruti Hoskere, Vedhus Hoskere and Divya Hoskere.

== Career ==
In puppetry, Anupama have experience in all areas, including puppet making, character design, costume design, script writing for puppet plays, music and lyrics for puppet plays, lighting, and sound effects in puppet plays. She is the founder director of the Dhaatu Puppet Theatre in Bengaluru. Anupama is also the Festival Director of the Dhaatu International Puppet Festival, an annual festival held in Bengaluru, which started in the year 2009. She founded the Dhaatu Puppet Museum in Bengaluru, a puppet museum that houses a collection of unique puppets from various states in India and around the world. Owner of over five thousand of different puppets, Anupama Hoskere is also the owner of the largest puppet collection in India.

Anupama also tries to innovate by breaking away from the traditional methods of puppetry. Having practiced Bharatanatyam for years, she has added strings to the legs of some puppets to make them dance. As per her own design, she has made a large Bharatanatyam dancer puppet with more than eleven strings, which helps in moving eyes and body parts of the puppet.

Anupama has also won the UN Erasmus Mundus Scholarship to teach Indian classical puppetry to postgraduate students, and taught at the Polytech Nice Sophia in France, the Université libre de Bruxelles (ULB), and at the University of Paris. She is a visiting faculty of the National Institute of Design, Bengaluru and also TEDx speaker at many universities of India.

Anupama is an empaneled artist of Indian Council for Cultural Relations. She have created about 14 one-hour puppet shows and 8 short puppet shows based on Inian epics and other stories. Apart from several venues in India, she have also performed puppetry shows at various international festivals in France, Belgium, Morocco, USA and China.

Anupama also held several positions including one of the advisory board members of the Ministry of Culture, Government of India, member of the Central Advisory Board on Culture, India, advisory board member of the Puppetry Cell of the Sangeet Natak Akademi, board member of the Kalakshetra Foundation in Chennai, and the committee member of the Karnataka Bayalata Akademi.

== Awards and honors ==
Anupama received Senior Fellowship in Puppetry from the Ministry of Culture, Government of India, to revitalize traditional eachanoor puppetry. She received the Sangeet Natak Akademi Award for Puppetry in 2018. In 2024, she received the Padma Shri in arts. She has also received many awards including the Vishalakshi Award from the Art of Living Foundation, and the Outstanding Woman Award from the Association of Kannada Kootas of America, San Francisco.

== Works on her ==
A documentary on her life and works has also been released.
