= Gokul Chandra Das =

Indian folk percussionist

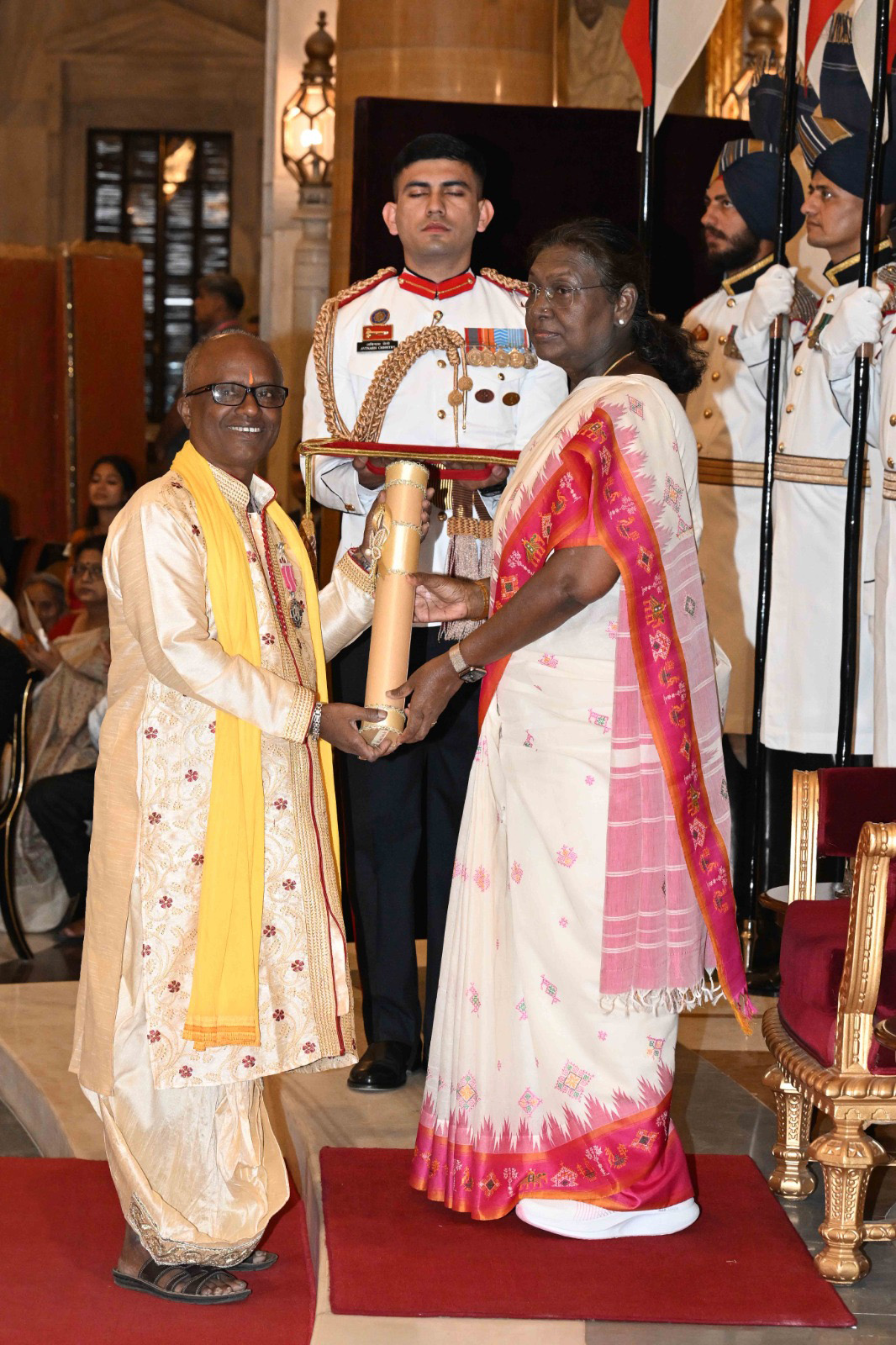
- Das receiving the Padma Shri Award in 2025

Background information
- Born: North 24 Parganas, West Bengal, India
- Instrument: Dhak
- Award: Padma Shri (2025)
- Website: www.gokuldhaki.in

Gokul Chandra Das is an Indian folk percussionist known for his expertise in playing the dhak, a traditional Bengali drum. He is widely credited with popularizing the art form globally and for empowering women through music. In 2025, he became the first dhaki (dhak player) to receive the Padma Shri, India's fourth-highest civilian award, for his contributions to the performing arts.

== Career ==
Das comes from a family of traditional drummers living in North 24 Parganas, West Bengal. He began playing the dhak at a young age. Over the years, he developed a distinctive style that blended classical rhythm with folk tradition. His performances have been appreciated both nationally and internationally, earning praise from musicians such as Ravi Shankar and Zakir Hussain.

== Contributions ==
In addition to preserving and promoting dhak traditions, Das is recognized for his efforts in social empowerment. He has trained over 150 women to become professional dhakis and consequently promoting financial independence in rural Bengal. Dhakis are traditionally men.

== Awards and accolades ==
Das has performed in major festivals across India and has represented Indian folk culture on global platforms. He was awarded the Padma Shri in 2025.

== See also ==
- Padma Shri
- Dhak (instrument)
- Indian folk music
