= Smriti Rekha Chakma =

Indian artisan

- Born: 20 September 1964 (age 61); Tripura, India
- Occupations: Artisan and loin-loom weaver
- Awards: Padma Shri (2024)

Smriti Rekha Chakma is an Indian artisan and loin-loom weaver from the Chakma community in Tripura known for her work with eco-friendly, vegetable-dyed cotton threads in traditional designs. She is the founder of Ujeia Jadha, an organization that trains rural and tribal women in weaving techniques.

In 2024, she was conferred the Padma Shri, India's fourth-highest civilian award, for her contribution to eco-friendly loin loom artistry.

== Early life and career ==
Born in 1964, Chakma grew up in the Chakma community. From a young age, she watched her grandmother weave on a loin loom, an old traditional tool, which sparked her interest in weaving. Chakma uses natural dyes in her work, made from locally gathered roots, seeds, herbs, and leaves. To make the dyes, she dries, crushes, and extracts colors from these natural items.

In addition to her weaving, Chakma founded Ujeia Jadha to preserve traditional weaving and teach skills to rural and tribal women.

== Awards ==
- 2000: received the Master Weaver Award from the president of India.
- 2018: Awarded the Sutrakar Samman at the "Sarees of India" exhibition organized by the Delhi Crafts Council.
- 2024: Awarded the Padma Shri for her work with eco-friendly loinloom artistry.
