= Shashadhar Acharya =

Chhau dance exponent (born 1961)

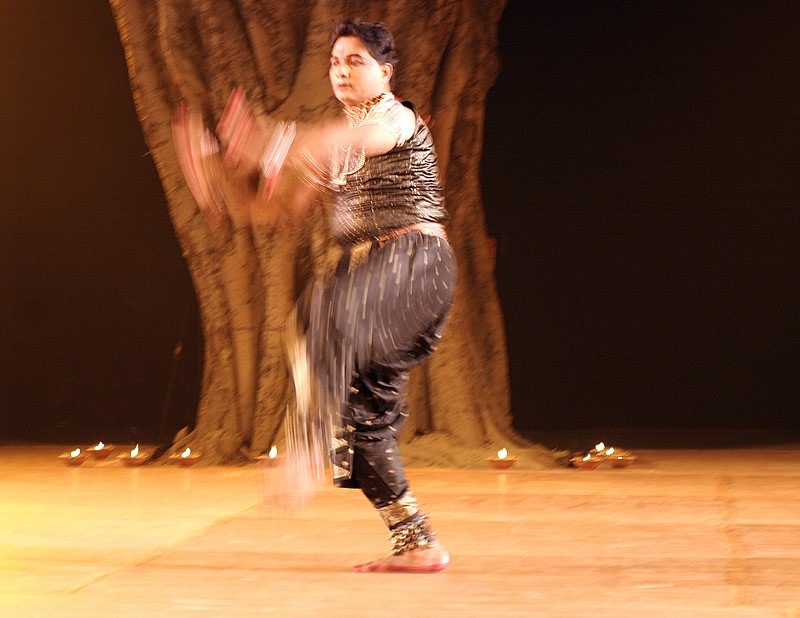
- Chhau dance performance in Delhi
- Born: Saraikela, Jharkhand, India
- Occupation: Chhau dance exponent
- Known for: Chhau dance
- Awards: Padma Shri (2020)

Shashadhar Acharya is a Chhau dance exponent from Saraikela, Jharkhand, India. In 2020, he received the Padma Shri honour from the Government of India for his contribution in the field of Arts.

== Life ==
Acharya is a fifth-generation dancer from his family. He learned Chhau from his father, Lingaraj Acharya, and then from Natshekhar Bana Bihari Pattnaik, Vikram Karmakar, Kedarnath Sahu, and Sudhendranath Singhdeo. In the early 1990s, he left Saraikela to work at the Gurukul Dance Academy and then at the Prithvi Theatre in Mumbai. He is a faculty member at the Film and Television Institute of India (FTII), Pune and at the National School of Drama, New Delhi. He teaches at the New Delhi–based Triveni Kala Sangam. In 2020, he received the Padma Shri honour for his contribution in the field of Arts.
