= S. Shakir Ali =

Indian painter

Syed Shakir Ali
- Born: 1956 (age 69–70); Jaipur, Rajasthan, India
- Occupation: Miniature painter
- Awards: Padma Shri; National Award; Nexzen Excellence Award

Syed Shakir Ali, is an Indian painter, known for his Mughal and Persian miniature paintings. He was honoured by the Government of India, in 2013, by bestowing on him the Padma Shri, the fourth highest civilian award, for his contributions to the field of art.

== Biography ==
Syed Shakir Ali was born in Jaipur, in 1915, to the art collector, Syed Sabir Ali, locally known as "Chunnu Mian". His grandfather, Syed Hamid Ali, was also a court artist. Syed Shakir Ali, though graduated in Arts from Rajasthan University in 1978, took up the tutelage of renowned painters, Ram Gopal Vijayvargiya and Ved Pal Sharmaand (Bannu) to learn Mughal and company styles of painting as well as traditional art.

Sayed Shakir Ali lives in Jawhar nagar in Jaipur. Syed Zohaib Ali, Syed Shakir Ali's son, also follows the footsteps of his father and is a known painter and a recipient of Roshan Kalapesi Memorial Award for Arts and Crafts from Paramparik Karigar

== Career highlights and exhibitions ==
The Ministry of External Affairs (India) have selected many of Sayed Shakir Ali's paintings for gifting to state dignitaries and other persons of importance. He has represented India in the 10th SAARC Folk festival held at Islamabad in 1992 where he won the first prize in the art competition. He is also credited with the restoration of some of the old paintings at the City Palace, Jaipur and Prince of Wales Museum, Mumbai.

Sayed Shakir Ali has been holding exhibitions since 1981, in India and abroad, in places like Milan, Paris, Bangkok, Dubai and Pakistan. Some of his notable exhibitions are:

- Miniature paintings by Sayed Shakir Ali and Babulal Marotia - October - November 2013 - Art Heritage, New Delhi
- 10th SAARC Folk festival - 1992 - Islamabad
- India Fair - 1995, 1996 and 1999 -Dubai
- Millennium Festival - 2003 - Hong Kong
- SME and Handicrafts Fair - 2005 - Mauritius
- Festival of India - 2006 - Brussels, Belgium
- Cultural and International Festival of Miniature and Illumination - 2007 and 2009 - Algeria
- Harmony Art Foundation - 2009 - Mumbai

Sayed Shakir Ali regularly holds live demonstrations, the first of which was at the Craft Museum, New Delhi, in 1981. Subsequently he has performed at other demonstrations held at the American and British Embassies and major hotel groups such as Taj Hotels Resorts and Palaces and Ashok Group.

== Awards and recognitions ==
In 2013, the Government of India honoured Sayed Shakir Ali with the fourth highest civilian award, Padma Shri. He is also a recipient of the Lalit Kala Akademi National Award, in 1993 He has also received the Nexzen Excellence Award, which was awarded to him in October 2014.
