= Lourembam Bino Devi =

Indian textile artist

Lourembam Bino Devi (born 1 March 1944) is a practitioner and a popularizer of the appliqué art of Manipur called Leeba in the Meitei language. The Leeba art is used in creating Monmai which is a decorative circular appliqué art piece used in covering both ends of the traditional Manipuri bolster pillow. In the olden days, Leeba was practiced at "Phiribi Loishang", which is a house for maintaining clothes worn by the deities and royals. The apparels used by the royals, including shoes, were mostly designed using the Leeba technique. Bino Devi has devoted her life to practice this art form and to revive it by trying to transmit her skills to younger generation of interested women. She has been providing this training in collaboration with the Heritage Foundation of Mankind, a Non-Governmental Organization located in Imphal. She has also conducted several workshops at Imphal and at various other places in India.

== Early life ==
Lourembam Bino Devi was born on 1 March 1944 at Singjamei Mathak Thokchom Leikai, Imphal West, Manipur to Thokchom Mani Singh and Thokchom ongbi Ibemhal Devi. She completed class IX from Tamphasana Girls' High School, Imphal. At the age of 17, just after her marriage, she started work in Phiribi/Leeba (traditional applique art of Manipur). She received training in this art under Lourembam Ibetombi Devi, her own mother-in-law, who was the first National Awardee in Handicraft in 1969. Besides various handicrafts, she has designed several traditional items that are mandatory for a Manipuri marriage ceremony like Monmai, Ningkham Samjin, Luhon Phijil, Harao Phijil, Khudol Khongup and Kangkhal Asuba. For her work, the Ministry of Textiles, Government of India awarded her a stipend of Rs.15,000 per year starting from 1996 to February 2014 and from March 2014 it has been increased to Rs.24,000 per year. She has been described as an expert appliqué artisan in the book "Khutheibalaktagi" written by Sanasam Biren Singh (2013).

== Recognition: Padma Shri ==
- In the year 2022, Govt of India conferred the Padma Shri award, the third highest award in the Padma series of awards, on Lourembam Bino Devi for her distinguished service in the field of art. The award is in recognition of her service as a "Veteran Appliqué Textile Artist preserving the Leeba textile art of Manipur for over five decades.".

== Other recognitions/achievements ==
The recognitions earned by Lourembam Bino Devi include:

- State Award for Master Craftsmen by Commerce and Industries Department, Government of Manipur (1996)
- First Prize Winner in the 46th All India Handicrafts Week Celebration 2000-2001 organized by Government of Manipur
- Restored the Flag of Maharaja Chandrakirti at Manipur Kulachandra Singh, Khuman Lampak, 2012
- Repaired two pairs of rare velvet shoes used by Maharaja Kulachandra Singh, (1890–91) for displaying at the Kangla Museum, Imphal, 2013
- Silpa Bhusan Award by Manipuri Sahitya Parishad, 2015
- Women Achievers Award by Mahila Morcha, BJP Manipur Pradesh (2015)

== See also ==
- Padma Shri Award recipients in the year 2022

== Additional reading ==
- Richana Khumanthem in conversation with L. Bino Devi, Imphal, August 2016: Richana Khumanthem. "Leeba (appliqué work of Manipur): In Conversation with L. Bino Devi". Sahapedia. Sahapedia.
- For an understanding of the Meetei identity expressed through the text and texture of clothing in ritual context: Yumnam Sapha Wangam Apanthoi M (February 2018). "Text and Texture of Clothing in Meetei Community: A Contextual Study" (PDF). International Journal of Research in Social Sciences. 8 (2): 236–255.
