= Moa Subong =

Indian musician

- Born: Dimapur, Nagaland, India
- Origin: Nagaland, India
- Genres: Folk music, folk fusion
- Occupations: Musician, instrument maker
- Instruments: Bamhum, Tikzik
- Award: Padma Shri (2023)

Moa Subong is an Indian musician and instrument innovator from Nagaland, known for developing a bamboo wind instrument known as the Bamhum. In 2023, he was awarded the Padma Shri in the field of art (folk music).

== Career ==
Subong has worked in the promotion of Naga folk music. Along with his wife, Arenla, he examined traditional Naga musical instruments after she was appointed as a folk music teacher. Observing limitations in the tonal range of some instruments, they developed a musical instrument known as the Bamhum.

Subong is the founder of the band Abiogenesis, which he co-founded with his Arenla.

== Personal life ==
Subong is married to Arenla, who has been involved in teaching folk music.

== Awards and recognition ==
- 2023: Awarded the Padma Shri for his contributions to the field of art.
