= Venkappa Ambaji Sugatekar =

Gondhali folk artist from India

Venkappa Ambaji Sugatekar (born 1 May 1943) is a Gondhali folk artist from Bagalkote, Karnataka, India. He was awarded the Padma Shri in 2025 for his contributions towards preserving the Gondhali art form.

== Early life ==
Venkappa Ambaji Sugatekar was born into the ghumantu samaj (the Alemari community) in 1943. He learned Gondhali folk music from his father and grandfather. He never received formal schooling.

== Career ==
Sugatekar started performing from the age of 10, and continued to for the next seven decades. He has sung and recited over 150 long-form mythological stories and over 1,000 Gondhali songs. Known as the "Bhishma of Gondhali music", he has performed domestically and internationally, through radio, TV and other platforms.

He has taught over 1000 students free-of-cost to encourage the survival of Gondhali folk music.

In 2022, an honorary doctorate was conferred upon him by the Karnataka Folklore University.

== Recognitions ==
- 2025 - Padma Shri, by the Government of India.
- 2017 - Janapadshri Award
- 2012 - Rajyotsava Award, by the Government of Karnataka
- 2004 - Kanataka Janapad Yakshagana Academy Award
