= Navaneetham Padmanabha Seshadri =

Indian musicologist

- Born: 2 January 1929; Kandiyur, Tamil Nadu, India
- Died: 16 November 2009 (aged 80); New Delhi
- Occupation: Musicologist
- Years active: Since 1949
- Spouse: Sakuntala
- Children: 2 sons and a daughter
- Parent(s): N. S. Padmanabha Ayengar; Lakshmi Sundari
- Awards: Padma Shri; Maya Award; Tansen Award; Tyagaraja Award; Ashoka Mayur Award; National Handloom Award; Asian Cultural Award; Hakim Khan Suri Award; Kalai Kavalan Award; Guruvayur Elephant Award; Rashtriya Ekta Award
- Website: Profile

Navaneetham Padmanabha Seshadri, popularly known as N. P. Sheshadri, was an Indian musicologist, scholar, administrator and the founder secretary of National Cultural Organization. He was known for his services for the promotion of Indian culture and heritage. IN2002, the Government of India awarded him the Padma Shri, the fourth highest Indian civilian award.

== Biography ==
Navaneetham Padmanabha Seshadri was born in a Tamil Brahmin family to N. S. Padmanabha Ayengar and Lakshmi Sundari at Kandiyur in the South Indian state of Tamil Nadu on 2 January 1929. He graduated in commerce (BCom) and continued his education to secure a doctoral degree (PhD). His career started in 1949 by joining the Ministry of Commerce and Industry where he, later, became the economic investigator, a first time appointment by the Planning Commission of India, in 1950. He stayed in that post till 1953 during which time he was involved in organizing exhibitions related to the five year plan under the Ministry of Information and Broadcasting. In 1953, he was transferred to the National Cooperative Development Warehousing Board for a three year term and in 1956 to 1957, he worked at the Publicity and Information Division of the Planning Commission. In 1958, he was appointed as the deputy director of the Song and Drama Division of the Ministry of Information and Broadcasting.

1968, he moved to the Cultural, Protocol and Trade Promotion Division as a joint director and in 1972, he took charge of the Asia '72, present day India Trade Promotion Organization, event of the Ministry of Commerce where he stayed till 1975. The next two years were spent at Planning Commission as a deputy director and in 1977, he was appointed as the joint development commissioner of the Handlooms Export Promotion Council (HEPC) under the Ministry of Commerce, a post he held till hs retirement from the government service. Seshadri served as the cultural advisor to the Trade Fair Authority for Agri Expo of 1977. He was the secretary of All India Music Society during 1949-50, was a member of the Bharati Centenary Celebration Committee in 1979 and was involved in the organization of Handloom Pavilion in Moscow in 1978.

Seshadri was known for his efforts for the promotion of Indian culture and heritage. He founded the National Cultural Organization (NCO) in 1950, inaugurated by the then Prime Minister of India, Jawaharlal Nehru. Under the aegis of this organization, he organized many cultural festivals in Delhi, such as the Tansen Festival, Thyagaraja Festival, Purandaradasa Festival and Bharati Festival. His contributions have been reported in popularizing Indian handloom. During his tenure as the joint development commissioner of HEPC, he introduced the Janata Sari and Janata Dhoti, selling the garments through HEPC outlets, at ₹15 (US$0.30) apiece. His efforts were also reported behind the drive to popularize Indian tea during his stint as the director of the Tea Promotion Council; his presentation of a packet of Indian tea to Lady Diana have been written about by the media.

Seshadri died on 16 November 2009, aged 81, succumbing to old age illnesses, leaving behind his wife, Sakuntala, two sons, N. S. Parthasarathy and N. S. Padmanabhan, and daughter Raji Gopalan.

== Awards and recognitions ==
Seshadri received Maya Award from the Guild of Architects in 1978 and the first Mian Tansen Award from the Dhrupad Society in 1979, followed by other awards such as Tyagaraja Award, Ashoka Mayur Award, National Handloom Award and Asian Cultural Award. He is also a recipient of Hakim Khan Suri Award, Rashtriya Ekta Award, Kalai Kavalan Award, Puradaradasa Award and Guruvayur Elephant Award. The Government of India honoured Seshadri in 2002 with the civilian award of Padma Shri.

== See also ==
- Musicology
