= Rajendra Tiku =

Indian sculptor and art teacher

- Born: 1953 (age 72–73); Wadwan, Jammu and Kashmir, India
- Awards: Padma Shri; Lalit Kala Akademi National Award; Jammu and Kashmir State Award; 8th Triennale Award

Rajendra Tiku, is an Indian Visual Artist with specialization in Sculpture and known for his outdoor stone sculptures. He was honoured by the Government of India, in 2013, by bestowing on him the Padma Shri, the fourth highest civilian award, for his contributions to the field of art.

== Biography ==
sculpture as a larger phenomenon, of which a medium, its execution and dimension etc. is only a part. The lot more beyond these attributes is its potential to reveal truth: Its potential to work on us in return and impart meaning to our existence. says Rajendra Tiku

Rajendra Tiku was born in Wadwan, a remote village in the mountainous landscape of Jammu and Kashmir, the northernmost state of India, in 1953, in a Kashmiri Pandit family. He did his primary schooling at a local school and passed his matriculation from a high school in Srinagar. His graduate studies were at the Sri Pratap College, Srinagar, where he founded the Sri Pratap College Artists' Association and Tiku, simultaneously, studied clay modelling and stone carving, by attending the evening classes of a five-year course conducted by the Institute of Music and Fine Arts in the city, which he completed in 1978. The course offered Tiku exposure to the art of ancient cultures and modern masters. After completing BSc, Tiku graduated in law from the Srinagar University, but continued attending the various art camps organized by the Jammu and Kashmir Academy of Art, Culture and Languages.

Rajendra Tiku started his career as a teacher at the Burn Hall School, Srinagar, but moved, shortly afterwards, to the Institute of Music and Fine Arts, his alma mater, as an artist cum teacher. He lives in Jammu and Kashmir.

== Career highlights and exhibitions ==
Rajendra Tiku has received both the junior (1993–95) and senior (1997–98) fellowships of the Ministry of Human Resource Development, the Government of India. He is also a recipient of a grant from the Pollock-Krasner Foundation, New York for commissioning sculptures at various parts in India, one of which can be found on the lawns of the Danwantri Library of the University of Jammu. Tiku has been invited to many sculpture workshops in places like USA, Switzerland, Israel, Russia, Egypt, and Thailand.

Rajendra Tiku has had solo and group exhibitions of his creations at various places around the world. Some of his notable exhibitions are:

- Metaphors in Matter (2008) held at Gallery Espace, New Delhi
- Bronze (2006) organized by Lalit Kala Akademi, held at Gallery Espace, New Delhi
- Sculpted Images (2003) India Habitat Centre, New Delhi
- Solo Exhibitions (1990, 1992, 1995, 1998 and 2003) held at Art Heritage, New Delhi
- Solo Exhibition (1998) organized by ABC Foundation, Varanasi
- National Exhibition of Art (India) organized by the All India Fine Arts and Crafts Society
- International Exhibition of Graphic Prints
- Bharat bienniale of Contemporary Indian Art
- 7th Triennale India
- 8th Triennale India

Tiku has also published many articles in local magazines and journals. he has also been credited with using Śāradā script, a dying script of the Kashmiri language.

== Awards and recognitions ==
In 2013, the Government of India honoured Rajendra Tikku with the fourth highest civilian award, Padma Shri. Besides, Rajendra Tiku has been honoured by different organizations many times.

- Eminent Artist National Award - 1993 - Lalit Kala Akademi
- Jammu and Kashmir State Award - 1978 - Government of Jammu and Kashmir
- Jammu and Kashmir State Award - 1979 - Government of Jammu and Kashmir
- Triennale Award - 8th Triennale - 1994

== Sculptures ==
Some of the notable sculptures of Rajendra Tiku are:

- Hearth Back Home
- My House in the Snow
- Snow Drops
- Sprout
- Blue Rosary
