= Sudarshan Sahoo =

Indian Sculptor

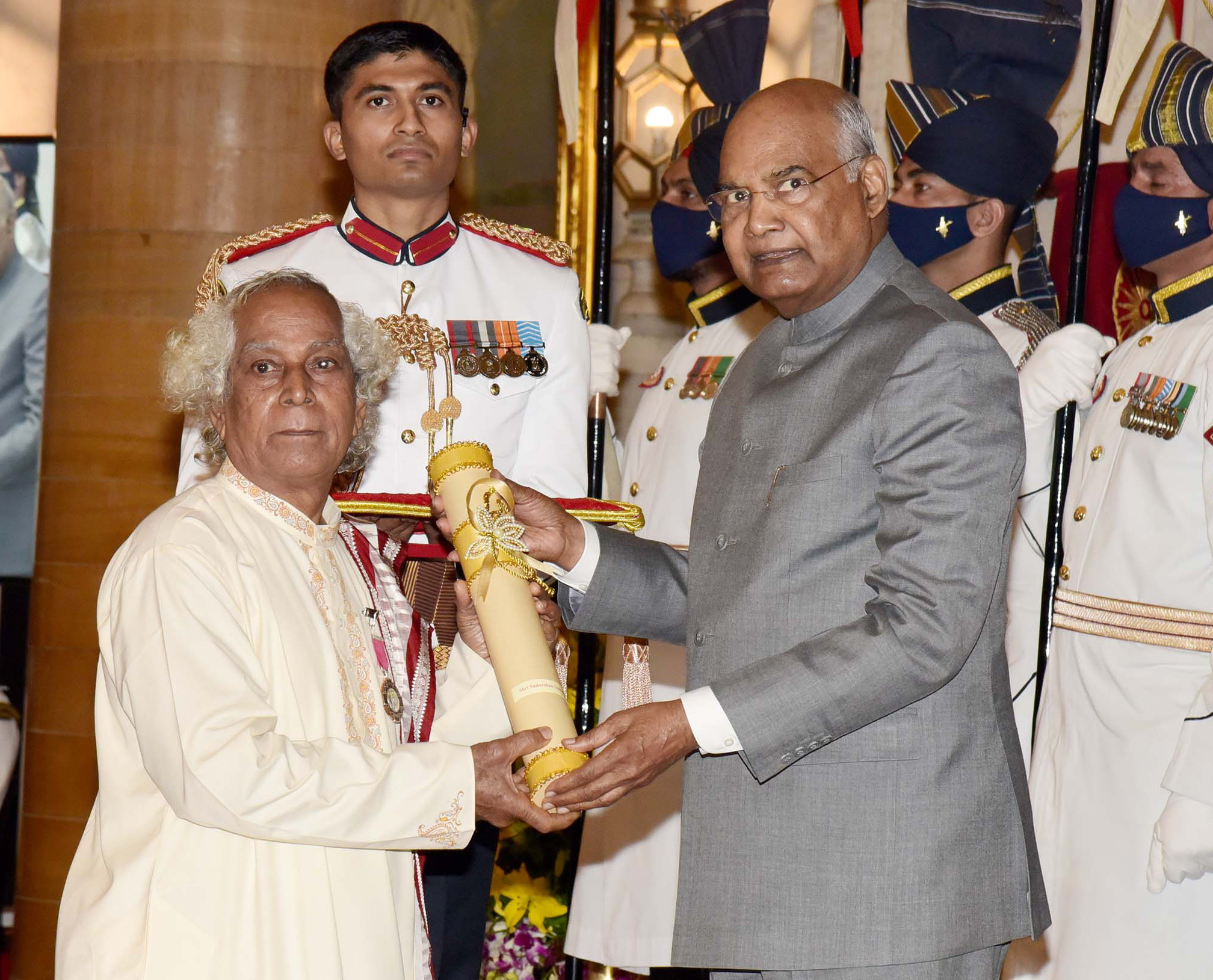
- Sudarshan Sahoo receiving Padma Vibhushan award from President Ram Nath Kovind
- Born: 11 March 1939 (age 87); Puri, Orissa Province, British India
- Occupation: Sculptor
- Years active: 1952–present
- Spouse: Annapurna Sahoo
- Children: Purnima, Ravi Narayan, Surya Narayan, Pushpalata
- Awards: Padma Vibhushan; Padma Shri; Shilp Guru
- Website: sudarshancrafts.com

Sudarshan Sahoo (born 11 March 1939) is an Indian sculpture artist from Puri, Odisha. He was awarded India's second highest civilian award Padma Vibhushan in 2021 and India's fourth highest civilian award Padma Shri in 1988.

Sahoo established Sudarshan Crafts Museum, Puri in 1977 and Sudarshan Art & Crafts Village, Bhubaneswar in 1991 with the help of the Government of Odisha.

== Awards and recognition ==
He received the National Award for stone carving in 1981, India's fourth highest civilian award Padma Shri in 1988, Shilp Guru award in 2003, Odisha Lalit Kala Academy's Dharmapada award in 2012 and India's second highest civilian award Padma Vibhushan in 2021.
