= Thavil Kongampattu A V Murugaiyan =

Thavil player from the Puducherry Union Territory in India

Thavil Kongampattu A V Murugaiyan (born 1964) is a thavil player from the Puducherry Union Territory in India.

In the year 2022, Govt of India conferred the Padma Shri award on Murugaiyan for his immense contribution for conserving the ancient Carnatic musical instrument thavil. Murugaiyan was the only person from Puducherry Union Territory to be honoured with a Padma award in the year 2022.

== Early life and education ==
Murugaiyan was born in Kongampattu village in Villupuram district in Tamil Nadu. Later he chose to live in Chinna Kottakuppam in Puducherry Union Territory. His father Vivekanandam was also a thavil musician and Murugaiyan learned the initial lessons in thavil from his father. He completed three years of study at the Govt Music College, Thiruvaiyaru and graduated with a degree in thavil. Later he learned everything about thavil from Valayapatti A R Subramaniam, a thavil exponent who had been honored with the Padma Shri award by Govt of India in the year 2007.

After his training, Murugaiyan started paying thavil in public concerts. He played thavil alongside several renowned musicians including his teacher Valayapatti A R Subramaniam, Soolamangalam Sisters, Thirunageswaran T R Subramanian, Namagiripettai K Krishnan and Thiruvizha R Jayasankar, L Subramaniyam and Ustad Alla Rakha. He is also serving as a thavil teacher at Villupuram Government Music School where he has taught more than 300 students in his several years of service.

Some of his notable performances include a performance in the Festival of India held in Paris in 1985 and a performance in the Rashtrapati Bhavan, New Delhi in the presence of the then President of India Dr APJ Abdul Kalam.

=== "Thavil Kongampattu" ===
Because of Murugaiyan's immense contributions for preserving the thavil instrument and his huge popularity as an exponent of thavil, the name of the instrument "Thavil" has come to be associated with the name of the village where he was born. The village is commonly referred to as "Thavil Kongampattu".

== Recognition: Padma Shri ==
- In the year 2022, Govt of India conferred the Padma Shri award, the third highest award in the Padma series of awards, on Kongampattu A V Murugaiyan for his distinguished service in the field of art. The award is in recognition of his service as a "Renowned Thavil player and Guru from Puduchery - Vidwan conserving the ancient Carnatic musical instrument."

== Other recognitions ==
- Conferment of the Kalaimamani award, the highest civilian award in the state of Tamil Nadu, India (2006)
- Selection as "Asthana Vidwan" (court musician) of Kanchi Kamakoti Peetham and Golden Temple, Sripuram
- Selection as an A+ (top grade) artist at All India Radio and featuring in several national broadcasts.
- Participation as an invited artist in the "Festival of India" in Paris in 1985.

== See also ==
- Padma Shri Award recipients in the year 2022
