= Pandi Ram Mandavi =

- Born: 12 February 1957 (age 69); Narayanpur district, Chhattisgarh, India
- Occupation: Traditional woodcarver
- Known for: Muria Wood art
- Awards: Padma Shri (2025)

Pandi Ram Mandavi is an Indian traditional artist and craftsman from the Bastar region of Chhattisgarh, India. He is known for his work in traditional woodcraft and making indigenous musical instruments. He was awarded the Padma Shri in 2025 for his contribution to art.

== Career ==
Mandavi belongs to the Muria community of Bastar and has worked in traditional wood carving and the making of musical instruments, including the traditional bamboo flute known as Sulur. His work represents the traditional art practices of the Bastar region. He has participated in programmes and exhibitions related to tribal art and craftsmanship. His contribution to preserving traditional craft practices has been recognised by the Government of India.
