= Machihan Sasa =

- Born: 1 April 1950 (age 76); Longpi Kajui, Ukhrul district, Manipur, India
- Occupation: Traditional artisan
- Known for: Longpi Hampai (Blackstone pottery)
- Awards: Padma Shri (2024)

Machihan Sasa (born 1 April 1950) is an Indian traditional artisan from Longpi Kajui village in Ukhrul district, Manipur. He practices the Tangkhul Naga craft of blackstone pottery, locally known as Longpi Hampai. In 2024, he was awarded the Padma Shri, India's fourth-highest civilian award, in recognition of his contribution to traditional arts.

== Early life and background ==
Machihan Sasa was born in Longpi Kajui, a Tangkhul Naga village historically associated with the production of blackstone pottery. The craft of Longpi Hampai involves the preparation of a paste made from ground black serpentine stone and a specific variety of brown clay known locally as Ham-Ngalei. Unlike most pottery traditions, it is shaped manually without the use of a potter’s wheel.

He acquired the knowledge of the craft from his father during childhood.

== Career ==
Sasa has been engaged in the practice and development of Longpi blackstone pottery for several decades. He introduced utilitarian and decorative objects such as tea sets, kettles, bowls, water mugs, vases, flower pots, dining plates and cooking vessels.

He has trained young artisans in the region, and several of his trainees have received State and National Awards.

He has participated in national and international craft exhibitions representing Longpi pottery.

== Awards and honours ==
- All India Handicrafts Week (1979)
- State Award (1986)
- National Award (1988)
- King Mela Medal (1997)
- Shilp Guru Award (2008)
- Padma Shri (2024)
