= Anup Ranjan Pandey =

Indian artist

- Born: July 21, 1965 (age 61); Bilaspur, India
- Awards: Padma Shri

Anup Ranjan Pandey is an Indian traditional Chhattisgarhi folk theatre artist. He received the Padma Shri Award in 2019.
