= Ajita Srivastava =

Indian singer (?-2024)

PS Ajita Srivastava
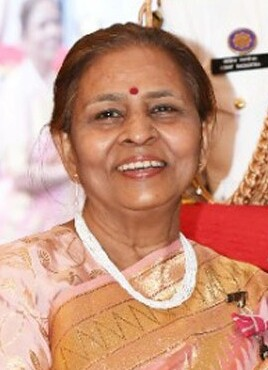
- Srivastava in 2022
- Born: Varanasi, Uttar Pradesh
- Known for: Kajari folk songs
- Awards: Padma Shri (2022); Uttar Pradesh Sangeet Natak Akademi Award (2017)

Ajita Srivastava was an Indian singer, educationist and social worker. Srivastava popularised and promoted Kajari folk songs, a form of folk music from Mirzapur and the surrounding region. She was awarded Padma Shri in 2022 by the Government of India for her contributions in the field of arts. Srivastava died on 17 August 2024, aged 70.

== Life and education ==
Srivastava was born in Varanasi, Uttar Pradesh. She completed her Sangeet Prabhakar from Prayag Sangeet Samiti in Prayagraj, B. Ed. from Gorakhpur University and M. A. from Banaras Hindu University.

Srivastava married Rasbihari Lal, a poet, writer and lawyer from Mirzapur, and settled there. They had one child.

== Career ==
Srivastava started her professional career with All India Radio Varanasi in 1980. She was associated with and performed for various organisations including All India Radio, Lucknow Doordarshan, Sangeet Natak Akademi Uttar Pradesh, Indian Council for Cultural Relations, Ministry of External Affairs, NCZCC Prayagraj, Ministry of Tourism, Ministry of Culture, Government of Delhi, Indian Army and T-Series among others.

In 2017, she retired as a lecturer from the Arya Kanya Inter College after 40 years of teaching. Since then, she worked to preserve, promote and propagate Kajari and other folk music of the region on the national and international level.

== Awards ==
- 2022 – Padma Shri
