= Pokhila Lekthepi =

Indian musician (born 1962)

- Born: 1962 (age 63–64); Timung Village, Dokmoka, Karbi Anglong district
- Genres: Karbi folksong, Karbi modern song
- Occupations: Vocalist, composer, lyricist
- Years active: 1964–present
- Awards: Padma Shri, 2026; Assam Gaurav, 2024; Shilpi Award, 2023

Pokhila Lekthepi (b.- 1962) is an Indian singer from Assam. She has been involved in Karbi music for more than four decades. She has sung more than 300 songs to date. In 2011, Hills Idol awarded her the title of Queen of Melody for her contribution to Karbi music. In 2009, she was awarded the Swabha Shilpi Amulya Kakati Memorial Award by the All Guwahati Students Union. In 2018, she was awarded the Luit Gaurav award by the Guwahati Refinery for the first time. She was awarded the Shilpi Award and Shilpi Pension by the Government of Assam on 17 January 2023 in recognition of her contribution to the field of Karbi music. In 2024, she was awarded the Assam Gaurav Award, the third highest civilian honor in Assam.

She was awarded with the Padma Shri by Government of India in 2026, the fourth highest civilian award of India, in Art category.

== Early life ==
Pokhila Lekethepi was born in Dupar Timung village near Dakmoka main market in Karbi Anglong district. She was born in 1962, according to educational documents. However, she stated that she was born around 1952 as she enrolled in school too late. Her father was Mukhim Lekthe and her mother was Basday Timupi. The parents of Pokhila were also interested in singing.

Pokhila's father played music in plays performed in villages at that time. Therefore, Pokhila was naturally attracted to music at a very young age. The primary school where she began her academic career used to have a song competition every Saturday. The teachers saw that her voice was good and asked her to enter the competition. She told her parents about it and her father gladly taught her the songs she sang in the plays.

== Career ==
In 1964, she participated in the music competition during the first Karbi Youth Festival held at Diphu Karbi Club. Lekthepi won first prize in several competitions and later composed her own songs.

In 1976, she received the first Karbi Kungripi Award at the Karbi Youth Festival held in Diphu. She won the title for the second time in 1978 when the event was held in Dongkamokam. She then got the opportunity to sing on the radio. She was given the opportunity to sing on the radio by the Director of the Karbi Branch of Aakashbani Guwahati after hearing her voice in Dongkamokam.।

There were no modern songs in Karbi at that time. Lekthepi created a new genre of Karbi modern songs. At that time, Joysing Rangpi wrote the lyrics and Lekthepi composed the melodies. The first cassette of Lekthepi in Karbi language was "Kanghon". Vidyasingh Rangpi also sang along with Lekthepi in this audio cassette. She has sung with several artists from Assam including Zubeen Garg.

== Discography ==
i) Dampo Ne,
ii) Aei Mayar Dhorat,
iii) Joi joi pen,
iv) Malong Aphuchong,

== Awards and honors ==
Lekthepi has made an outstanding contribution to the field of Karbi folk music and modern songs. She was credited with promoting and disseminating Karbi folk music. She has also contributed to the widespread popularity of Karbi songs through the creation of Karbi modern songs.

In 2011, Hills Idol awarded her the title of Queen of Melody for her contribution to Karbi music. In 2009, she was awarded the Swabha Shilpi Amulya Kakati Memorial Award by the All Guwahati Students' Union.

In 2018, the Guwahati Refinery awarded her the Luit Gaurav Award for the first time.

On 17 January 2023, the Government of Assam awarded her the Shilpi Award and Shilpi Pension in recognition of her contribution to Karbi music

In 2024, the Government of Assam awarded her the Assam Gaurav Award, the third highest civilian honor in Assam for the year.

In 2026, She was awarded with the Padma Shri by Government of India, the fourth highest civilian award of India, in Art category.
