= Hemoprova Chutia =

Indian artist and handloom weaver (born 1955)

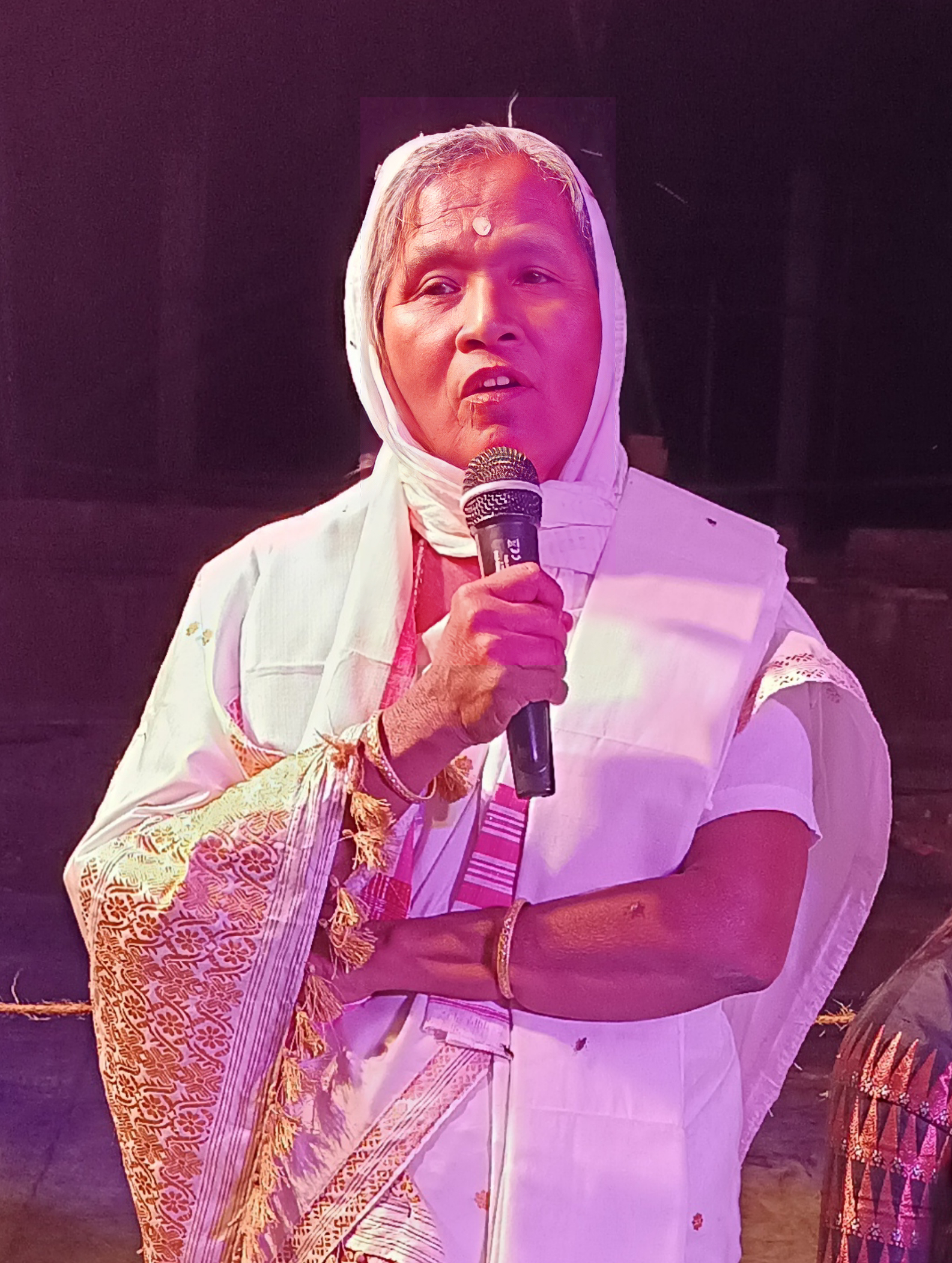
- Born: September 22, 1955; Assam, India
- Known for: Artist and handloom weaver
- Awards: Padma Shri (2023)

Hemoprova Chutia (born September 22, 1955) is an Indian handloom weaver and artist based in Dibrugarh, Assam who has crafted a variety of creations using diverse fabrics such as cotton, silk, wool, and intricately cut bamboo. She has received various awards and honours for her contribution in the art, including the Assam Gourav award presented by the Government of Assam in 2022.

== Early life and career ==
Hemoprova was born on September 22, 1955, in the village of Photikachowa Abhoypuria in the district of Dibrugarh, located in the state of Assam. Her father worked as a primary school teacher. Due to circumstances, she was only able to complete her education up to matriculation level.

Hemoprova created four books using her handloom. These books include "Gunamala" by Srimanta Sankardeva, "Naam Ghosa" by Madhabdeva, and the Bhagavad Gita in Assamese, Sanskrit, and English. Using a technique called "Barnab Astra" in Assamese, she weaved each text onto four separate cloths. The "Gunamala" cloth measures 80 ft in length and 18 inches in breadth, made from Muga cloth with Black wool. The "Namgukha" cloth, is 200 ft long and 2 ft wide, made from Muga silk and Black wool. The "Bhagavat Gita" was weaved in both Sanskrit and English using Muga silk and green wool. The Sanskrit "Barnabastra" measures 150 ft in length and 2 ft in breadth, while the English "Barnabastra" is 280 ft long and 2 ft wide.

== Awards and honours ==
- 2023: Awarded the Padma Shri in New Delhi by a President of India, Droupadi Murmu in the field of Art.
- 2021: Received the Assam Gaurav award, one of the highest civilian awards presented by the Government of Assam.
- 2018-2020: Received the Aai Kanaklata Award, Bakul Bon Award, state government’s Hand-loom and textile award for her weaving.
