= Prakash Chand Surana =

Indian jeweler, business person (1939–2015)

- Born: 1939; Jaipur, Rajasthan, India
- Died: 5 February 2015 (aged 75–76)
- Occupations: Johuree; Business person Music connoisseur
- Known for: Hindustani music Kundan meenakari jewelry
- Spouse: Shobha Devi
- Children: Two daughters, Two sons
- Awards: Padma Shri; Sawai Bhawani Singh Award; Dagar Gharana Award
- Website: www.suranajewellery.com

Prakash Chand Surana (1939 – 5 February 2015) was an Indian jeweler, businessman, philanthropist, and connoisseur of Hindustani classical music. He was known for his contributions to the promotion of Indian classical music and for his efforts to revive traditional jewelry-making techniques.

== Early life ==
Surana was born in 1939 in Jaipur, Rajasthan, into a Marwari family. He inherited his family's jewelry business and contributed to reviving the Kundan meenakari tradition of jewelry making.

== Career ==
Surana was the co-founder and president of Shruti Mandal, a music forum established in Jaipur in 1964. Under his leadership, the organization aimed to revive and promote the Jaipur gharana tradition of Hindustani classical music. Over the years, Shruti Mandal hosted performances by renowned artists such as Kumar Gandharv, Ravi Shankar, Zakir Hussain, Bhimsen Joshi and Hariprasad Chaurasia.

== Personal life ==
He was married to Shobha Devi, and the couple had four children: Chandra, Manju, Pracheer, and Priti. Surana died on 5 February 2015 due to cardiac arrest, at the age of 75–65.

== Awards and honours ==
In 2016, the Government of India posthumously awarded him the Padma Shri, the country's fourth-highest civilian honour, in recognition of his contributions to the arts. He was also the recipient of the Sawai Bhawani Singh Award for excellence in business and industry, and the Dagar Gharana Award from the Maharana of Mewar Foundation.

== See also ==
- Jaipur gharana
