= Naresh Chander Lal =

Indian film director and producer

- Born: Andaman and Nicobar Islands, India
- Citizenship: Indian
- Education: National School of Drama, New Delhi
- Occupations: Film director, producer
- Years active: 1990–present
- Organization: Andaman People Theatre Association (APTA)
- Awards: Padma Shri (2016)

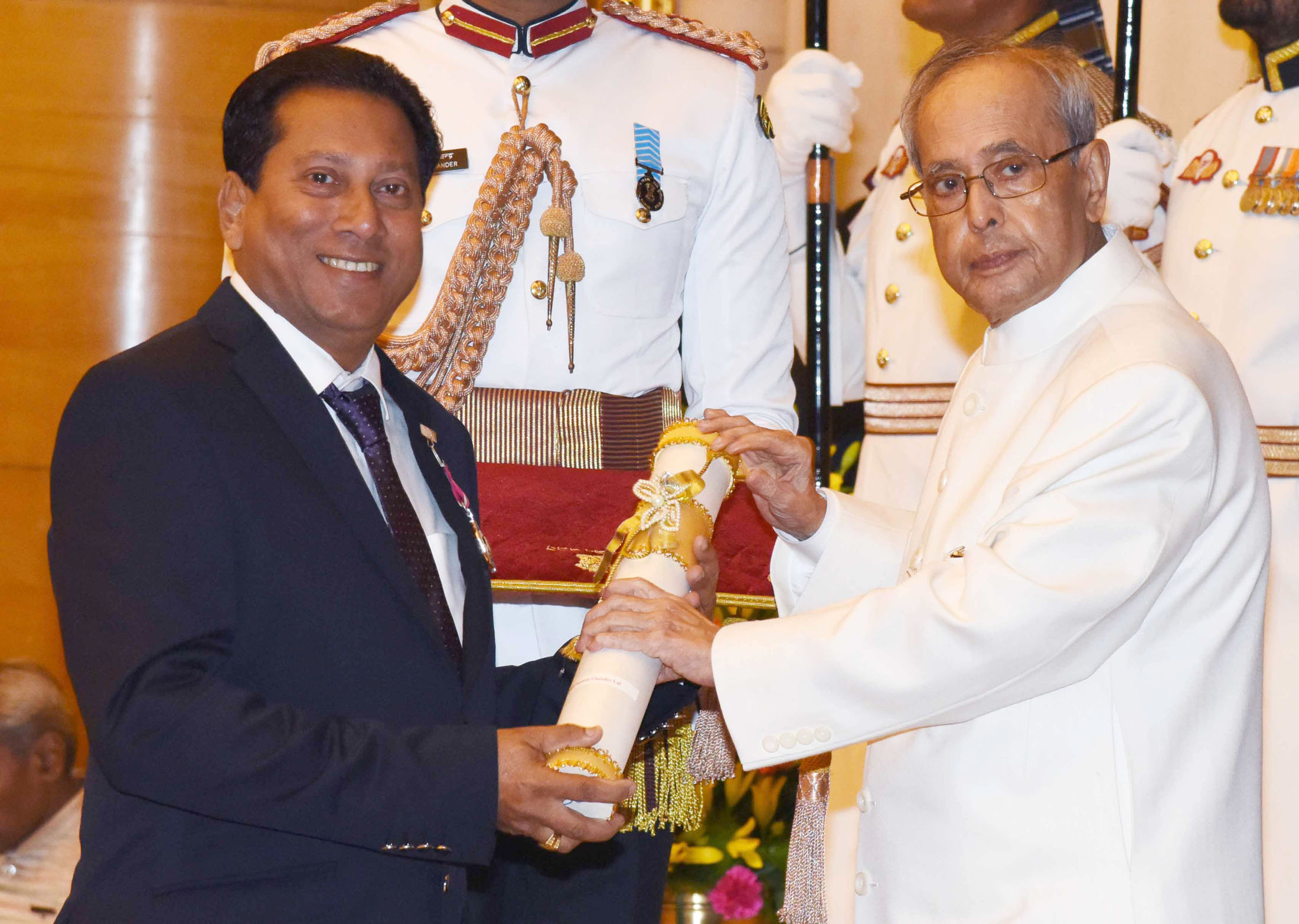
Indian president, Shri Pranab Mukherjee presenting the Padma Shri Award to Shri Naresh Chandar Lal, 2016

Naresh Chander Lal is an Indian film director and producer. He was awarded Padma Shri for his contribution in films and theater in 2016. He is the second person to receive the Padma Shri award from Andaman and Nicobar Islands.

Lal graduated from National School of Drama, New Delhi in 1990. He is the founder of Andaman People Theatre Association (APTA), and credited with bringing drama to remote areas of Andaman and Nicobar Islands. In 1998, he organized Street theater (Nukkad natak) centering around various social concerns such as alcoholism, pulse polio immunization programme, AIDS, family planning, women empowerment, sanitation, etc. He has directed two feature films, one short film and one documentary film. His documentary film Runway on the Sea was premiered in the Island Tourism Festival in 2012. In 2013, he was awarded Bharat Jyoti Award by the India International Friendship Society, and Mahatma Gandhi Seva Medal by Gandhi Global Family, both for his film Gandhi The Mahatma.

== Filmography ==
- Gandhi The Mahatma (Feature film)
- Queen of Indigenous Island (Feature film)
- Runway on the Sea (Documentary)
- Amrti Jal (Short film)

== Awards ==
- 2016 - Padma Shri by President of India - for his contribution in film and theater
- 2013 - Bharat Jyoti Award by India International Friendship Society, New Delhi - for Gandhi The Mahatma film
- 2013 - Maja Koene Social Activist award by Centre for Experiencing Socio Culture Interaction (CESCI), Switzerland - for Gandhi The Mahatma film
- 2013 - Mahatma Gandhi Seva Medal by Gandhi Global Family - for Gandhi The Mahatma film
