= G. C. D. Bharti =

Indian musician (1959–present)

- Born: 15 April 1959 (age 67); Raipur, Chhattisgarh, India
- Occupation: Singer
- Parent: Vidyadhar Gaina Bharti
- Awards: Padma Shri
- Website: https://bhartibandhu.com/

G. C. D. Bharti (Bharati Bandhu) is an Indian musician known for his Kabir bhajans.

== Early life ==
He was born on 15 April in Raipur, in the Indian state of Chhattisgarh to Vidhyadhar Gaina Bharti. His early musical training was under his father's tutelage and later, trained Ghazal, Thumri and Dadra under Ustad Ashiq Ali Khan and Sufi music under Ustad Haji Eid Ali Shah Chishti.

== History ==
Bharti is the lead vocalist of Bharti Bandhu Group, an Indian musical troupe based in Raipur, Chhattisgarh. The members of Bharti Bandhu are GCD Bharti, Vivekanand Bharti, G Ramanand Bharti and C Vidrumna Vachaspati Bharti. Their musical style has been developed from family musical tradition. The troupe has been reported to have performed in four Chhattisgarhi movies, Pirit Ke Jang, Chhattisgarh Mahatari, Ram Milahi Jodi and Muktiram. Bharti Bandu sing Sufi songs and the verses of Kabir. The troupe has performed widely in India, and have given nearly 6000 performances. The members of the group have trained thousand of students.

== Awards ==
Bharti was honored by the Government of India, in 2013, with the fourth highest Indian civilian award of Padma Shri.
