= Velu Aasaan =

Parai artist from India

Velu Aasaan is a Parai artist and teacher from Alanganallur in Madurai district, Tamil Nadu, India. He is widely credited for revitalizing Parai, a traditional percussion instrument, both in India and internationally. In recognition of his contributions, he was awarded the Padma Shri, India's fourth highest civilian honor, in 2025.

== Early life ==
Velu Aasaan (his birth name is Velmurugan) was born into a Dalit family in Mettamalai village near Sattur, Virudhunagar municipality, Tamil Nadu. From a young age, he showed a keen interest in the Parai, a drum traditionally played at funerals and public events. His father, Ramayya, and other family elders played the instrument, but social stigma discouraged him from formally pursuing it. His first Parai was a gift from his uncle when he was 10.

Despite family resistance, Aasaan began practicing at 13, learning from local masters such as Malaichaami Vaadhiyaar and Saegu Vaadhiyaar, who are his elder brothers. Financial hardship forced him to take on numerous odd jobs, but his passion for music persisted.

== Career ==
Aasaan's career began after his first public performance at a village festival in Alanganallur, where audiences recognized his talent. Despite early setbacks and an eight-year hiatus due to lack of support at home, he later returned to the Parai, dedicating his life to its promotion.

He founded the Alanganallur Thappisai Kuzhu, now Tamil Nadu's largest Parai troupe, and later established Samar Kazhaikuzhu in 2001 to train new generations of artists. Aasaan is known for breaking gender barriers by training women performers in a field traditionally dominated by men.

His overseas performances include China, United States, Dubai, Singapore, Malaysia, and Sri Lanka, where he both performed and taught Parai Isai.

== Recognition ==
In 2025, he was conferred the Padma Shri by the government of India. Apart from this, he has won numerous other awards in the last couple of decades.
