= Aruna Sairam =

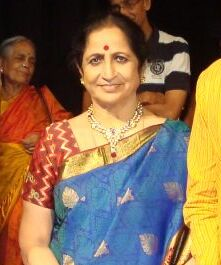
- Aruna Sairam in 2013
- Born: 30 October 1952 (age 74); Mumbai, Maharashtra, India
- Occupations: Vice-chairman of Sangeet Natak Academy, vocalist
- Honours: Kalaimamani (2006); Sangeetha Choodamani (2006); Padma Shri (2009); U.S Congress Proclamation Award (2008); Sangeetha Kalasarathy (2014); Sangita Kalanidhi (2018)
- Musical career
- Genres: Carnatic; Indian classical; Playback singing; Hindustani; Filmi; Bhajan
- Instruments: Vocals, veena

Aruna Sairam is an Indian classical vocalist and carnatic music singer. She is a recipient of the Padma Shri award from the Government of India and was elected as the Vice Chairman of the Sangeet Natak Academy (India's premier national institution for music and dance) by the Government of India until 2022. In 2011, Aruna was the first Carnatic musician to perform at the BBC proms in London. She is also the first Carnatic musician to perform in Oud Festival of Israel (Jerusalem).

== Early life ==
Aruna Sairam was born in Mumbai into a Tamil musical family. She received vocal training from her mother Rajalakshmi Sethuraman, who was a student of the Alathur Brothers and Thanjavoor Sankara Iyer. Her father Shri Sethuraman was a music connoisseur who hosted musicians and dancers in the family home. At one of these gatherings, Aruna met Sangita Kalanidhi Smt. T. Brinda, who trained her in the style of Veena Dhanammal. Indian-American business executive and former chairman and chief executive officer of PepsiCo, Indra Nooyi, is Aruna's niece.

Over the following years, Aruna performed Carnatic music, drawing on the influences of Mumbai and in a pure classical style. She was influenced by film, western and Hindustani (northern Indian) classical music. She ushered in a new approach to concert presentation, extending the boundaries of the Carnatic repertoire while retaining classical grammar and tradition.

Aruna Sairam has two daughters, Gayathri and Maithreyee. Gayathri Sairam's wedding reception in 2011 was grand, and covered by national media. Maitreyee Krishnaswami (1974-2020) succumbed to cancer in Seattle at the age of 45.

== Training ==
Aruna Sairam was taught by Sangeeta Kalanithi T. Brinda.

S Ramachandran, from the bani (style) of Chittor Subramanya Pillai, expanded her already wide repertoire and taught her the fine nuances of nereval singing (improvising within poetic texts). A S Mani, a disciple of Tiger Vardacharyar, guided her through the creative process of swara singing (improvising with the sol-fa). Prof T R Subramanyam, an acclaimed music professor at Delhi University, taught Aruna to sing and spontaneously compose within ragam-tanam-pallavi. K S Narayanaswamy.

Despite her extensive training, Sairam felt the need for guidance in voice training to become capable of fully expressing her creativity and knowledge through her voice. She met German voice maestro Eugene Rabine, who helped her discover and apply a new sound and emotion to her voice. She later took advice and guidance from Carnatic singer M. Balamuralikrishna. To this day, she remains in touch with the New York-based voice teacher David Jones.

== Career ==
=== India ===
Aruna Sairam has performed at the Indian President's official residence – Rashtrapati Bhavan – and the memorials to Indian prime ministers Indira Gandhi at Shakti Sthal and Rajiv Gandhi at Veer Bhoomi. She has also performed across the country at venues including The Music Academy in Chennai, the National Centre for the Performing Arts in Mumbai, Siri Fort Auditorium in Delhi, and at seminars and the festival held at the Indira Gandhi National Centre for the Arts in Delhi, the Music Forum in Mumbai, and the Kolkata's Sangeet Research Academy. She has performed in Mysore chamundi hill for TVS Motor company annual music festival in January 2020. In March 2025, she had performed thrillana project for mahindra percussion festival

=== International ===
This experience gave her a mission to make South Indian classical music global. She performed at the BBC Proms at London's Royal Albert Hall as the first South Indian classical vocalist in the Proms' then-116-year history in 2011. Sairam has also performed at New York's Carnegie Hall, Paris's Théâtre de la Ville and Morocco's Fes Festival of World Sacred Music. She has performed in Darbar music festival for 3 times in London.

== Collaborations ==
Aruna Sairam has collaborated with many artists across the globe. Here is a list of some of the artists with whom Sairam has collaborated:

=== India ===
• Shankar Mahadevan • U. Srinivas • Vid. Neela Bhagwat • Jayanti Kumaresh • Coke Studio- Ram Sampath • Sudha Raghunathan • Agam Band • Zakir Hussain • Ronu Majumdar • Haricharan • Thayir Sadam Project • Malavika Sarukkai (Dancer) • Pt. Jayateerth Mevundi • Kaushiki Chakraborty • Padma Subrahmanyam • Gaurav Majumdar • Vivek Sagar • Usha Uthup • Shubha Mudgal

=== International ===
• Dominique Vellard • Michael Riemann • Christian Bollman • Hari Sivanesan • Nouruddine Tahiri • Jesse Bannister • Vijay Iyer • Rajika Puri (Dancer) • Soumik Datta • Marco Horvat • Rudresh Mahanthappa

== Awards and recognitions ==
Sairam has won many national and international awards, including the Padma Shri and the US Congress Proclamation of Excellence.

She received Chevalier Award by French Government on 5 November 2022.

- Kalidas Samman from the Government of Madhya Pradesh, 2020
- Rama Gana Kalacharya Award from Sree Ramaseva Mandali, Chamrajpet, Bengaluru
- Sangeetha Kalanidhi from the Madras Music Academy, 2018
- Padma Shri from the Government of India, 2009
- Aruna Sairam has been appointed as vice-chairman of the prestigious Sangeet Natak Akademi, Delhi, 2015
- Sangeet Natak Akademi Award, Government of India, 2014
- Isai Mani Magudam Award by Rajalakshmi Fine Arts, Chennai, 2015
- Arsha Kala Bhushanam Award by Arsha Vidya Gurukulam, Coimbatore, 2014
- Rajah Sir Annamalai Chettiar Award by Rajah Sir Annamalai Chettiar Memorial Trust Chennai, 2013
- Shri P. Obul Reddy and Smt. P. Gnanambal Award 2012
- Indira Sivasailam Endowment Award, 2012
- Sangita Kala Nipuna by Mylapore Fine Arts Club, Chennai, 2012
- Sake of Honour Award by Rotary Club of Ambattur 2011
- U S Congress Proclamation of Excellence, 2008
- Gaana Padmam by Brahma Gana Sabha, 2008
- The "Kalaimamani" by the Government of Tamil Nadu, 2006
- The "Isai Selvam" by the Government of Tamil Nadu, 2006
- Sangita Choodamani by Sri Krishna Gana Sabha Chennai, 2006
- Aruna Sairam has been appointed the Advisor to the Department of Culture, Tamil Nadu, on Musical Education by the Chief Minister of Tamil Nadu.

== Recordings ==
As of 2019, Sairam has recorded over 60 records. Her recordings span classical repertoires, thematic presentations, concert recordings and collaborations with German, French, Moroccan and other international artists. Six of her albums have been produced and distributed in Europe and the US. She has collaborated with artists including French artistry Dominque Vellard and Christian Bollman of Germany, as well as with eminent Hindustani musicians. She has also released "Aruna: Thousand Names of the Divine Mother", an album containing sacred chants from the Lalitha Sahasaranamam.

== Teaching ==
Aruna Sairam has undertaken various mentoring programmes, notably the 2011 BBC World Routes Academy Project by BBC Radio 3.

She has written a detailed thesis about voice training and she tutors young artists in this subject. In 2014, she was invited as a Faculty to the International Jazz Convention at the Banff Centre, Canada, by its Director Vijay Iyer.

Every year, The Sangeet Research Academy in Kolkata invites Aruna as a mentor and member of its expert committee and as the external examiner for the graduating scholars of the academy.

=== Foundation ===
She and her husband have set up the Nadayogam Trust, which gives performance opportunities to young musicians. Under the Nadayogam Trust, a scholarship scheme has been instituted, through which violins were given to students of S V College of Music and Dance, Tirupati. The trust also maintains an archive of teaching materials and a collection of recordings.

== Critical reception ==
Aruna has been well received by overseas publications across her performances. In 2011, Pulse Connects called her the "darling of Carnatic vocal music" before her performance at the BBC Proms. Outlook Magazine compared her talent to that of famed vocalist M S Subbulakshmi, calling her purity of voice, diction, sruti alignment and singing, similar to those of Subbulakshmi's.

London Evening Standard has called her the "New Queen of Soul", comparing her with Aretha Franklin.
