= Sangeetha Choodamani =

Sangeetha Choodamani (Tamil: சங்கீத சூடாமணி) is an award bestowed on selected Carnatic musicians by Sri Krishna Gana Sabha, Chennai (India) every year. The Sabha organizes a music festival called Gokulashtami Sangeetha Utsavam for 60 days during August - October.

On the inaugural day of the festival, a Carnatic musician of merit and popularity is honoured with this award that carries a cash award, a gold medallion, a scroll and a shawl.

== Recipients of the Award ==
Year	Recipient
1971	Lalgudi Jayaraman + N. Ramani
1974	T. M. Thiagarajan
1975	Vellore G. Ramabhadran
1976	Nedunuri Krishnamurthy
1977	Maharajapuram Santhanam
1978	Palghat R. Raghu
1979	Mani Krishnaswami
1980	D. K. Jayaraman
1981	M. Chandrasekaran
1982	Voleti Venkatesvarulu
1983	T. N. Seshagopalan
1984	Trichy Sankaran
1985	U. Srinivas + R. Vedavalli
1986	Umayalpuram K. Sivaraman
1987	Thanjavur K. P. Sivanandam
1988	T. K. Govinda Rao
1989	T. R. Subramaniam
1990	R. Chitti Babu
1991	Bombay Sisters
1992	Thanjavur S. Kalyanaraman
1993	T. K. Murthy
1994	Sikkil Sisters
1995	Chitravina N. Ravikiran
1996	T. V. Sankaranarayanan
1997	Sudha Ragunathan
1998	Lalgudi G. J. R. Krishnan
1999	D. Rukmini + M. P. N. Ponnusamy + M. P. N. Sethuraman
2000	Prof. R. Visweswaran
2001	Trichur V. Ramachandran
2002	P. S. Narayanaswamy
2003	O. S. Thiagarajan
2004	Suguna Purushothaman
2005	Bombay Jayashree
2006	Aruna Sairam
2007	Maharajapuram S. Ramachandran
2008	Hyderabad Sisters Lalitha & Haripriya
2009	Lalgudi Vijayalakshmi
2010	S. Sowmya
2011	Srimushnam V. Raja Rao
2012	A. Kanyakumari
2013	T. V. Gopalakrishnan
2014	Jayanthi Kumaresh + Mannargudi A. Easwaran
2015	Neyveli Santhanagopalan
2016	Thiruvarur Bakthavatsalam
2018	Dr Kadri Gopalnath
2019	P. Unnikrishnan
2022	Abhishek Raghuram
2023	Mysore Nagaraj & Manjunath
2024	Ranjani & Gayatri
2025	K. V. Prasad
