= Sudha Ragunathan =

Indian Carnatic classical vocalist

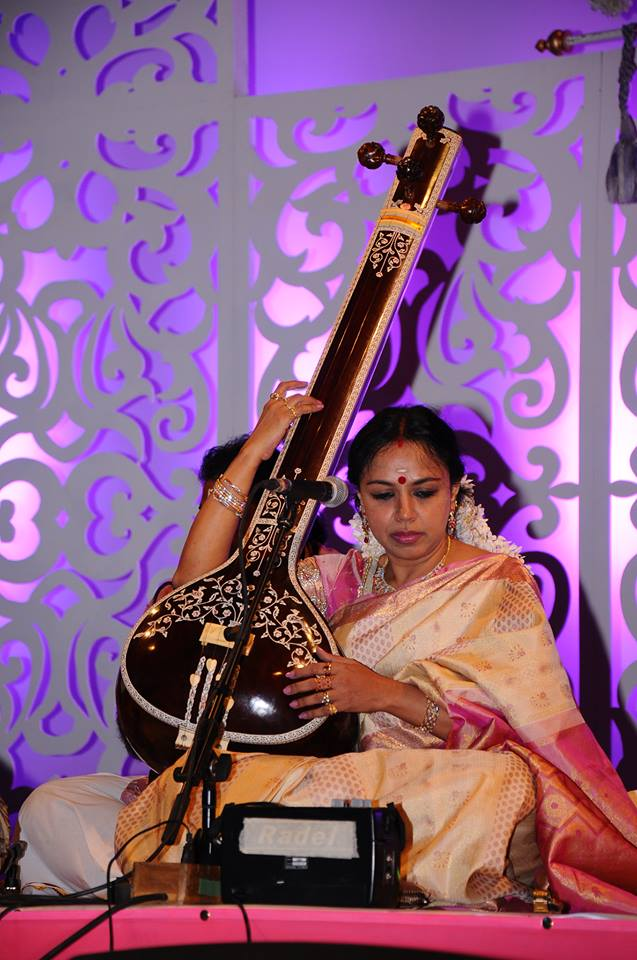
- Ragunathan at Music Academy, Chennai
- Born: 30 April 1957 (age 69); Madras (present-day Chennai), Tamil Nadu, India
- Education: Ethiraj College for Women (PG in Economics)
- Occupations: Singer, composer
- Spouse: Ragunathan (m. 1982)
- Children: 2
- Parents: Venkatraman; Choodamani
- Honours: Kalaimamani (1993); Sangeetha Saraswathi (1993); Sangeetha Choodamani (1997); Sangeetha Kalasarathy (2000); Padma Shri (2004); Sangita Kalanidhi (2013); Padma Bhushan (2015)
- Musical career
- Genres: Carnatic; Indian classical; playback singing; Filmi; Bhajan
- Instruments: Vocals, veena
- Website: www.sudharagunathan.com

Sudha Ragunathan is an Indian Carnatic vocalist, singer and composer. She was conferred the Kalaimamani award by the Government of Tamil Nadu in 1993-1994, Padma Shri (2004) and Padma Bhushan (2015) by the Government of India, and Sangeetha Kalanidhi by Madras Music Academy in 2013.

== Early life and education ==
Sudha Ragunathan (née Sudha Venkatraman) was born in Chennai on 30 April 1957 and later shifted to Bangalore. She did her schooling in Good Shepherd Convent, Chennai. She studied at Ethiraj College, and obtained a postgraduate degree in economics.

== Musical career ==
=== Training ===
Sudha Ragunathan received her initial training in Carnatic music from her mother V. Choodamani. From the age of three, she began to learn bhajans, Hindu devotional songs. Her tutelage continued under B. V. Lakshman. In 1977, she received an Indian government scholarship to study music under a doyenne of Carnatic music, Dr. M.L Vasantha Kumari, whose student she remained for thirteen years.

Trained under Dr. ML Vasanthakumari in the gurukula style, it involved considerable amounts of listening to the teacher and other practitioners to absorb their style and oeuvre. Part of her duties involved the accompaniment on the tanpura of her teacher during concerts, and also accompanying her during concerts. In her own words, "A period of 13 years from 1977 to 1990, a phase of complete absorption and internalisation! There was no teaching in a formal atmosphere. We learnt while being with her during the katcheris (concerts). We would record her singing in our minds and then replay it while learning the intricacies. It was a very challenging and different experience and as I had begun learning very early from her, my mind was like a sponge and absorbed whatever I heard".

As of January 2015, she was preparing to debut in Kollywood as a music director with the upcoming Tamil film Thanneer, based on a novel published in 2009 by Ashokamitran.

=== Performances and critical reception ===
Ragunathan has performed at the Madras Music Season every year since 1990, the year in which her guru Dr. ML Vasanthakumari died. She is considered one of India's leading Carnatic performers. In 2013 she was awarded the Sangita Kalanidhi of the Madras Music Academy. She was awarded the Padma Bhushan, India's third-highest civilian honor, in January 2015.

On 2 October 2016, the United Nations released a stamp to honour India's Carnatic music artist Bharat Ratna Dr.M S Subbulakshmi. This stamp was presented to Raghunathan to honour her performance at the United Nations on 2 October 2016.

In August 2025, in an interview with The Hindu, she credited Chennai and its unique Margazhi season for anchoring her art, describing the city as one of “soul and substance” where tradition meets modernity.

== Concert performances ==
Ragunathan has performed and collaborated with other artists all over the world. She has performed at the United Nations and the Théâtre de la Ville, Paris. She performed at the Alice Tully Hall, Lincoln Centre, at New York Broadway to commemorate 50 years of the Bharatiya Vidya Bhavan. She is the only Indian vocalist to have participated in the Global Vocal Meeting organized by the Burghof, an Academy of Music and Arts at Lorrach, Germany and produced by Stimmen Voices International Vocal Festival.

=== Other music ===
Ragunathan has also performed as a playback singer in Tamil cinema. She got her first break as a playback singer under Illayaraja in the movie Ivan, performing the song "Enna Enna Sethai". Besides the Carnatic repertoire, Raghunathan has also explored the world music scene, in particular fusion music.

=== Teaching ===
Following Carnatic musicians, Ragunathan has also taught the tradition to her students. She launched her own school, Sudhaarnava Academy for Musical Excellence, on the day of Vijayadashami in 2017. The school has a faculty of her students along with Ragunathan herself and has conducted lec demonstrations and workshops in many venues across the globe.

== Personal life ==
She is married and has two children.

== Charitable works ==
Ragunathan is known for her charitable works, and launched the Samudhaaya Foundation in 1999, of which she is the founder and managing trustee. The foundation has assisted the underprivileged in the areas of child healthcare, infrastructural aid for homes, and heart surgeries for children. The foundation has raised funds for victims of the Gujarat earthquake and cyclone relief in Orissa.

== Film credits ==
Year	Movie	Song	Co-artists	Composer	Language
1996	Kalki	Porul theadum bhoomiyil	K S chithra	Deva	Tamil
2002	Ivan	"Ennai Yenna Seithai Vengulalae"		Ilaiyaraaja	Tamil
2002	Ivan	"Enakkinai Yaar"		Ilaiyaraaja	Tamil
2002	Ivan	"Kannan Nee En"		Ilaiyaraaja	Tamil
2004	Runway	"Pattu Vennilavu"	Suresh Peters, Jyostsna Radhakrishnan	Suresh peters	Malayalam
2004	Morning Raga	"Thaye Yashoda"	Ranjani Ramakrishnan	Amit Heri	English
2005	Thavamai Thavamirundh	"Theme"	Sarath, Madhu Balakrishnan	Sabesh–Murali	Tamil
2005	Pon Megalai	"Aadum Patham"		Ilaiyaraaja	Tamil
2006	Ilakkanam	"Masilla Maniye"	Shweta Mohan, Rajalakshmi, Subiksha	Bhavatharini	Tamil
2007	Satham Podathey	"Kadhal Periyadha"		Yuvan Shankar Raja	Tamil
2007	Thavam	"Kannadasa Kannadasa" (Mix)	Mahalakshmi Iyer	D. Imman	Tamil
2008	Uliyin Osai	"Abhinayam Kaatugindra"	Bombay Jayashri	Ilaiyaraaja	Tamil
2008	Vaaranam Aayiram	"Annal Mele Panithuli"		Harris Jayaraj	Tamil
2008	Surya S/O Krishnan	"Nidhare Kala" (D)		Harris Jayaraj	Telugu
2009	Aadhavan	"Yeno Yeno Panithuli"	Shail Hada, Andrea Jeremiah, Sudha Raghunathan, Sri Charan	Harris Jayaraj	Tamil
2009	Ghatikudu	"Edo Edo"	Shail Hada, Andrea Jeremiah, Sudha Raghunathan,	Harris Jayaraj	Telugu
2010	Mandhira Punnagai	"Enna Kuraiyo"		Vidyasagar	Tamil
2011	Narthagi	"Vaan Mazhaiyin Thuligal"	P. Unnikrishnan	G. V. Prakash Kumar	Tamil
2012	18 Vayasu	"Unnai Onru"	Sriram Parthasarathy	Charles Bosco	Tamil
2013	Endrendrum Punnagai	"Kadal Naan Thaan"	MK Balaji, Suzanne D'Mello	Harris Jayaraj	Tamil
2013	Chirunavvula Chirujallu	Kadale Nee	Ranina Reddy, M.K. Balaji	Harris Jayaraj	Telugu
2018	Sketch	"Dhaadikaara"	Thaman S, Andrea Jeremiah	Thaman S	Tamil
2019	Kaalidas	"Mazhai"		Vishal Chandrasekhar	Tamil
2021	Navarasa	"Kannunjal"		Justin Prabhakaran	Tamil
2024	Boat	"Soka Naanum Nikkiren"		Ghibran Vaibodha	Tamil

== Albums ==
Year	Song	Album	Music	Co-singers
2012	"Koniyada tharame"	Thrahimam 2	Pranam Kamlakar	Roopa Revathi
2012	"Sannuthinthumo Prabho"	Thrahimam 2	Pranam Kamlakar	

== Awards ==
- 1988: Bharat Jyothi from Bharatiya Vidya Bhavan, New York.
- 1991: Isai Peroli and VST Award from Karthik Fine Arts, Chennai
- 1992: "Gaana Sudha Amrithavarshini" from Sree Kanchi Kamakotti Peetam
- 1992: "Ugaadi Puraskar Award" from Telugu Academy
- 1992: "Youth Excellence Award" from Sri Maharajapuram Viswanatha Iyer Trust
- 1993: Sangeeta Saraswathi from The Mahasannidanam of Sringeri
- 1993: Received title of Kalaimamani Award by the Government of Tamil Nadu, which is the highest state honour in the field of Arts.
- 1994: "Rasika Kala Ratna" from Rasikapriya, Sydney
- 1994: "Swara Raga Laya Ratna" from Academy of Indian Music, Melbourne
- 1996: "Thennisai Thilakam" from the Federation Tamil Sangams of North America and the Tamil Nadu Foundation, USA
- 1997: Sangeetha Choodamani, from Sri Krishna Gana Sabha, Chennai.
- 1998: Gana kuyil from Valmiki Manram, Chennai
- 1998-1999: "Woman of Golden Substance 1998-1999" from Rotary Club, Chennai
- 2000: Sangeetha Kalasarathy from Parthasarathy Swami Sabha, Chennai, from Shri Jayendra Saraswathi of Kanchi Mutt
- 2000: "Isai Chelvam" from Muthamizh Peravai from Kalaingar Dr. M.Karunanidhi
- 2000: "Sivan Isai Selvi" from Papanasam Sivan Rasika Sangam
- 2001: Rashtriya Ekta Award at the 57th birth anniversary celebrations of Rajiv Gandhi in recognition of achievements and contribution to fine arts
- 2001: Outstanding National Citizen Award from the National Citizen's Guild, New Delhi
- 2001: Gem of India Award at the All India Achiever's conference in the category of fine arts and culture.
- 2001: "Seva Ratna Award" from The Centenarian Trust, Chennai
- 2001: "Sangeeta Kala Sironmani" from Nungabakkam Cultural Academy Trust, Chennai
- 2003: MLV Platinum Jubilee Award from Dr. MLV Cultural Trust, Chennai
- 2004: Padma Shri awarded by Government of India
- 2005: 'Nadha Ratnakala' from the Universal Fine Arts.
- 2005: 'Nadha Kavidha' under the aegis of the music journal Nadha Brahmam
- 2005: 'Vani Kala Sudhakara' from the Thyaga Brahma Gana Sabha.
- 2005: The Tamil Brahmin Association (THAMBRAAS) at Chennai presented Ragunathan with the 'Award of Excellence' at the Silver Jubilee of State Conference.
- 2005: 'Sangeetha Mamani' from the Sri Rama Bhaktha Jana Samaj, K.K.Nagar, Chennai
- 2005: Ragunathan received the title of "Nadha Kalanidhi" from Sri Shanmukhananda Sangeetha Sabha, New Delhi.
- 2005: Padma Sarangapani Cultural Academy honoured her with the Padma Sadhana award.
- 2006: The Rotary Club of Trichirapalli Fort, Trichy presented Ragunathan with the 'VOCATIONAL EXCELLENCE Award'.
- 2007: "Gaana Padmam" from Brahma Gana Sabha, Chennai
- 2010: Sangeetha Kokila from Tamil Sangam Navi Mumbai
- 2013: Sangita Kalanidhi from Madras Music Academy.
- 2015: Padma Bhushan awarded by Government of India
- 2017: "Rama Gana Kalacharya National Award" from Sree Ramaseva Mandali.
- 2017: Sama Gana Mathanga National Award from Bharatiya Sama Gana Sabha.
- 2017: "Sangeetha Ratnakara" from Sri Surabharathi Sanskrit and Cultural Foundation, Bengaluru
- 2021: Sangeet Natak Akademi Award from Sangeet Natak Akademi.
- 2012: "Arsha Kala Bhushanam" from Pujyasri Swami Dayananda Saraswati, organized by Arsha Vidya Gurukulam
