= Sree Ramaseva Mandali =

Indian cultural organization

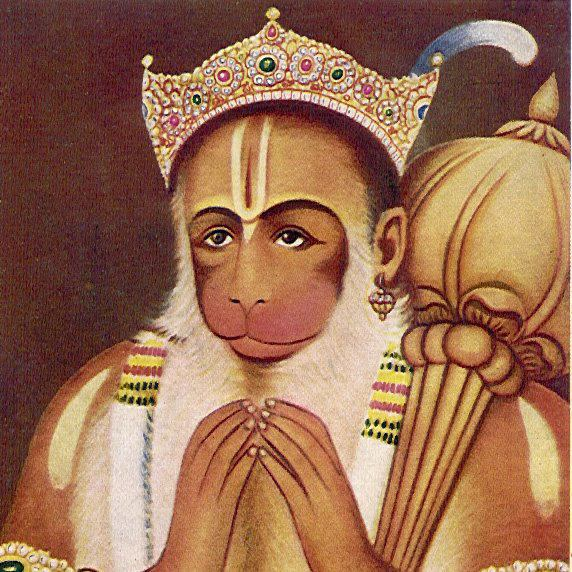

Sree Ramaseva Mandali is an 80 years old cultural organisation known for organising Indian Classical Music Festivals as part of its Rama Navami celebrations at Chamrajpet, Bangalore. The organisation was founded in the year 1939 by Sri S.V.Narayanaswamy Rao at the age of 14.

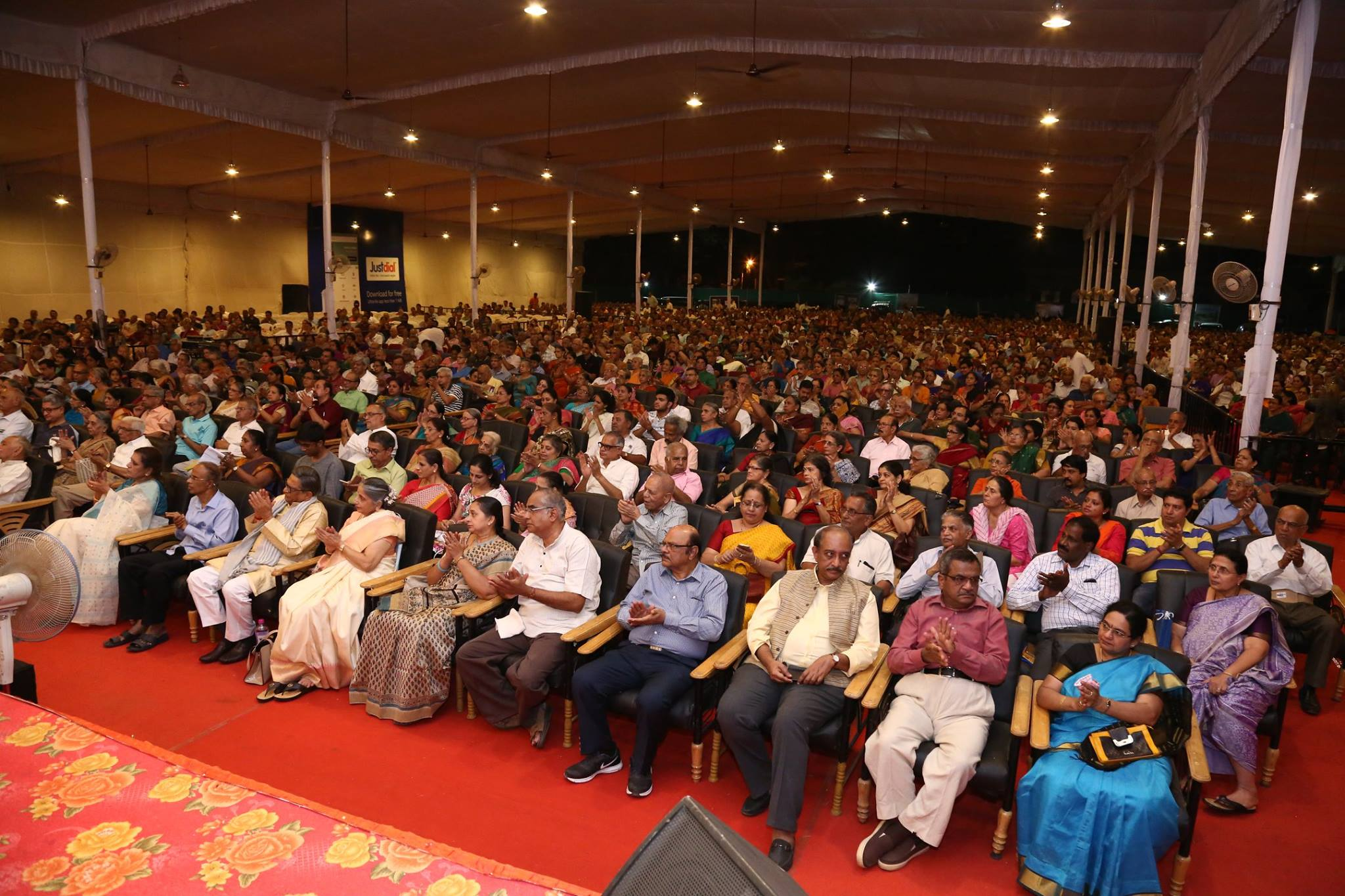
The Temple of Music

Sree Ramaseva Mandali has hosted who's who of Indian classical music. Bharata Rathna M S Subbalakshmi has performed in the Ramanavami for a record 32 times. K.J. Yesudas has been performing for the past 5 decades. Some of the other veteran artistes who have performed include Chembai Vaidyanatha Bagavatar, Bismillah Khan, Bade Gulam Ali Khan, Ali Akbar Khan, L.Subramanaiam, M. Balamuralikrishna, M Vasanthakumari, D.K.Pattamal, Ariyakudi Ramanuja Iyengar, Neyveli Santhanagopalan, Madurai TN Seshagopalan, Emani Shanker Shastri, Sudha Raghunathan, Ranjani Gayatri, and Bombay Jayashree.

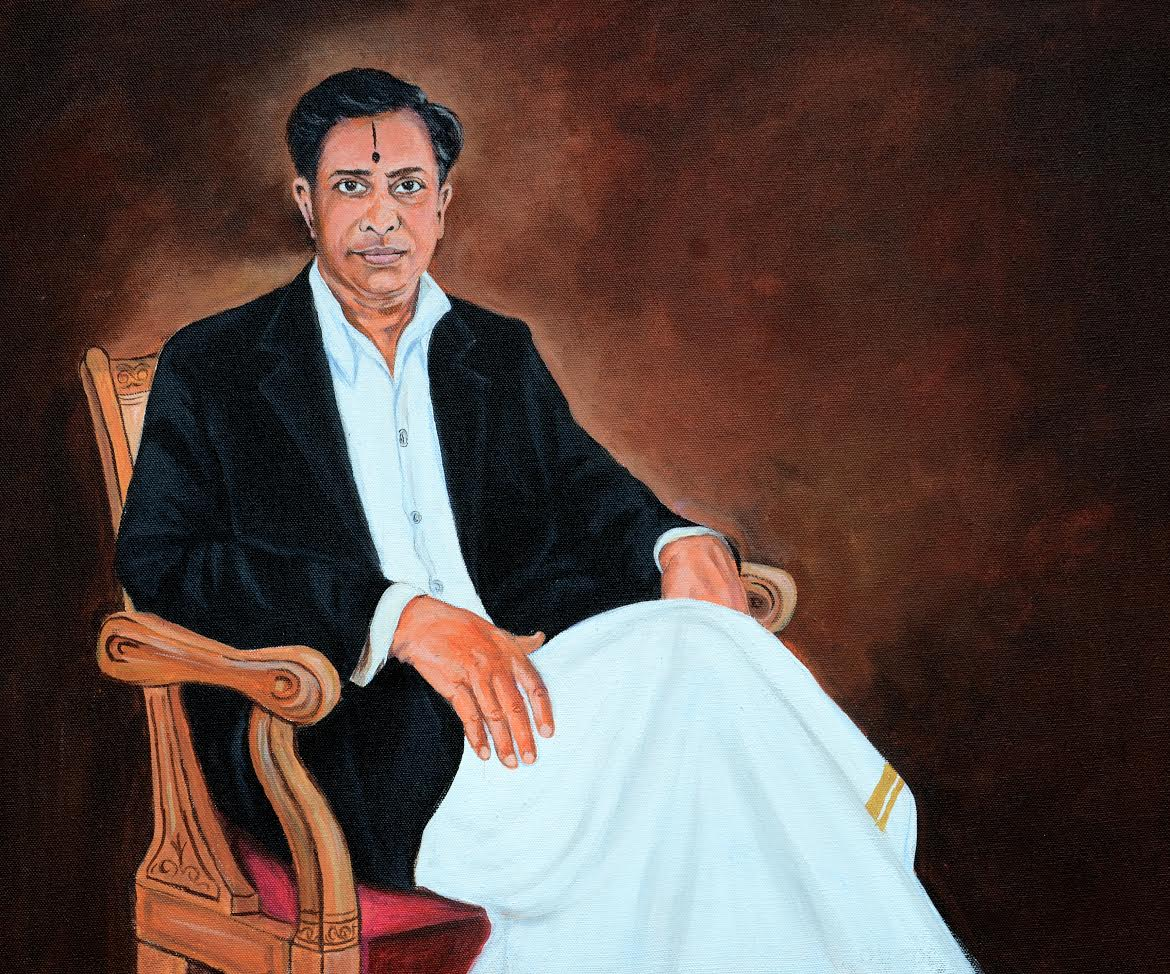
S.V.N RAO

Over 2 - 3 lakhs audience witness this 31 days long music festival. 3 Presidents of India, 4 Vice Presidents of India and all most all the Governors and Chief Ministers of Karnataka State have attended this popular festival, which is sometimes referred as tomorrowland of Indian classical Music.

Bharata Rathna Sri Rajagopalachari referred the organisation as the Temple of Music.

The festivities of the Mandali are held at a makeshift auditorium at the century old, Old Fort High School Grounds Chamarajapet. The Mandali has also adopted the historic Old Fort High School whose alumni include stalwarts like N Lakshman Rau, Kengal Hanumanthaiah to name a few.

Sree Ramaseva Mandali, Ramanavami Celebrations Trust is a recognised and registered Cultural Trust with FCRA license from the Government of India. Sri S V Narayanaswamy Rao who led the organisation for 6 decades from the day of its birth died on 5 January 2000 and since then S. N. Varadaraj his son is leading the organisation. Dr.C.S.Kedar I.A.S (Retd) happens to be the Chief Mentor and Sudha Murty Chairperson of Infosys Foundation happens to be the Chief Patron of the organisation.
