= S. V. Narayanaswamy Rao =

Indian cultural advocate (1924–2000)

Shivarpatna Vasudev Rao Narayanaswamy Rao (1924–2000), popularly known as S.V.Narayanaswamy Rao, is the founder of Sree Ramaseva Mandali.

S.V.Narayanaswamy Rao founded Sree Ramaseva Mandali at the age of 14 and continued to guide it till he died in the year 2000, after which his last son S. N. Varadaraj succeeded him and became the Chief Functionary of the organisation.

He is also credited with grooming many prominent musicians of today. Sree Ramaseva Mandali in his memory every year conducts a National Youth Music Festival and the participants are being honoured with the S.V.Narayanaswamy Rao Award for Excellence. A National Award was also instituted in his memory by a sister organisation of the Mandali and the recipients includes Bharata Rathna M.S.Subbalakshmi and Balamurali Krishna.

With an intention to preserve and propagate the life of S.V.Narayaanswamy Rao a foundation by name S.V.Narayanaswamy Rao Foundation for Education & World Music has been established.

The Government of Karnataka as a respect to the Music legend has named 2nd Cross of Chamrajpet as S.V.Narayanaswamy Rao Marg.

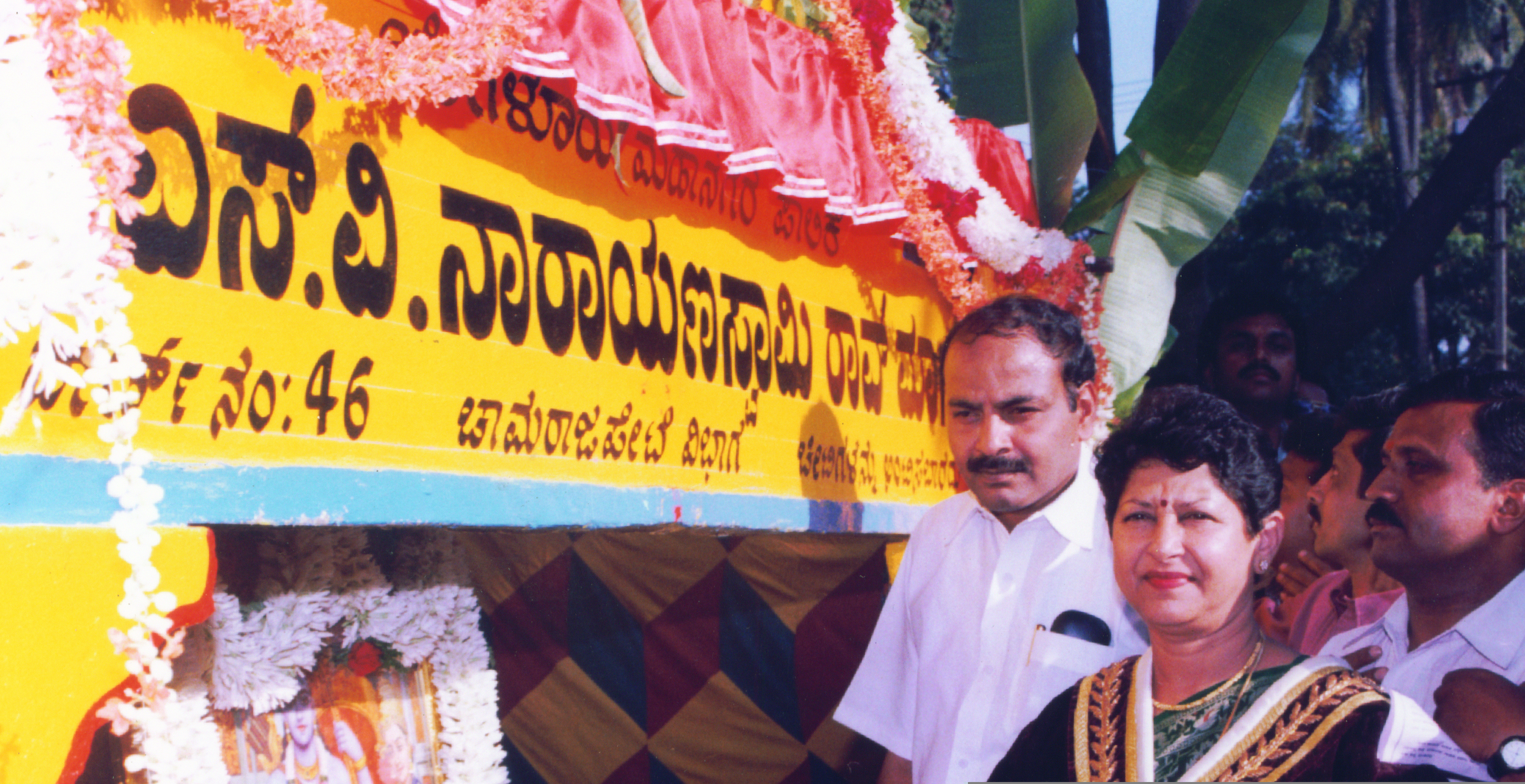
