= K. V. Prasad =

Indian percussionist (born 1958)

Kalaimamani K. V. Prasad
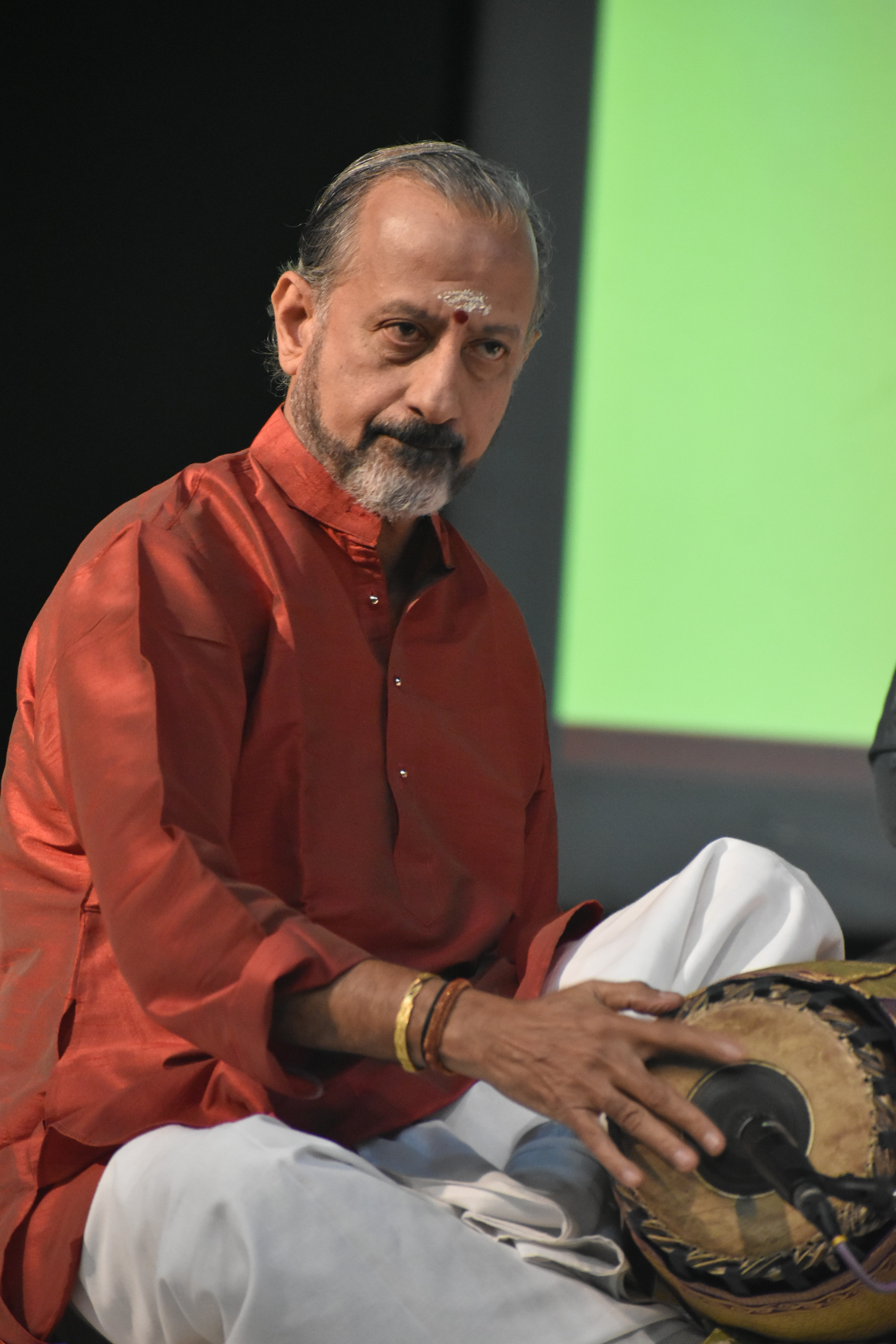
- Prasad in 2025

Background information
- Born: Krishna V. Prasad; 4 May 1958 (age 67); Ernakulam, Kerala
- Genres: Carnatic music
- Instruments: Mridangam, Chenda, Edakka
- Years active: 1984-present
- Spouse: Usha
- Awards: Kalaimamani (2000); Kerala Sangeetha Nataka Akademi Award (2010); Sangeet Natak Akademi Award (2012); Sangeetha Choodamani (2025)

Kalaimamani K. V. Prasad (born 4 May 1958) is an Indian percussionist from Kerala, who plays the Mridangam and performs Carnatic music. He is known for being a versatile percussionist, with deft fingering, a key element of the grand Thanjavur style he is trained in.

== Career ==
K. V. Prasad born on 4 May 1958 in Ernakulam, Kerala. As a child, whenever he went to the Ernakulam Shiva Temple, with his father Krishna Iyer, who was known locally as 'Castrol Krishna Iyer', Prasad would play the Chenda in the temple. One day, Marar, the staff artist at the temple, who observed his interest on this percussion instrument, asked his father to train him in some percussion instrument. His father accepted that, but decided to teach him the Mridangam instead of the Chenda.

Prasad started training in Mridangam at the age of 6 under the tutelage of Ernakulam Narayana Iyer and later trained for 15 years under Parassala Ravi, principal of the Swathi Thirunal College of Music in Thiruvananthapuram and T. K. Murthy. He also received training in other percussion instruments like the Chenda and Edakka, and in Carnatic vocals. He also learnt vocal music from a very young age for almost 12 years under Ottapalam Mahadeva Iyer at the Kerala Fine Arts Hall. H. This training has helped him while playing the mridangam in concerts.

He has accompanied M. S. Subbulakshmi from 1984 to 1998 until her retirement from public performances. Along with M.S. Subbulakshmi, he had the privilege to represent India at the festival of India in Moscow in 1987. He is also into film music recordings for the past 30 years and has worked with many great film music directors. He has played for a number of Malayalam film songs, many of which, like "Pramadavanamveendum" from the film His Highness Abdullah and "Orumuraivanthu" from Manichitrathazhu, turned out to be hits. He also had the opportunity to do a mridangam mix for a recording by Semmangudi Srinivasa Iyer supported by M. S. Subbulakshmi, which was sung informally and without any accompaniment. This was released as an album titled Divine Unison. Prasad graduated from Sacred Heart College, Kochi in 1978.

He has also worked on over 500 South Indian films with almost all the leading music directors of yesteryears, like Johnson, Vidyasagar, Ilaiyaraja, Raveendran Master and many more. Apart from Carnatic legends, he has also accompanied Zakir Hussain, G. Harishankarr and T. H. Vinayakram in Holland, Hungary, Germany and Switzerland. He has also performed in United Nations Assembly Hall on 2 October 2016 in commemoration of 50th year of M. S. Subbulakshmi's concert on 2 October 1966.

He was an 'A Top Rank' Mridangam artist at All India Radio, Chennai, after joining All India Radio, Chennai as a staff artist (instrumentalist) in 1984, and he retired from there on May 31, 2018, after 34 years of service.

The playing that gives importance to 'gumki' (type of finger stroke on left side of the Mridangam), following and imitating different banis (unique style of singing in Carnatic music) of different singers while accompanying them, the tonal quality acquired from recording experience in AIR, the traditional purity of the soft, gentle music, and the lack of superficiality - these are the qualities of his Mridangam playing that pointed out by many including music critic Subbudu.

He regularly performs in SPIC MACAY concerts across India.

== Personal life ==
Prasad was the youngest of three brothers. His father, V. Krishnan, was a manager with Castrol in Kochi. Prasad did his schooling at SRV High School. After completing his Bachelor's degree in Botany from Sacred Heart College, Kochi in 1978, he was interested in pursuing a post-graduate degree in Botany. But witnessing the financial difficulties of his parents to educate his elder brothers, he decided to work after his degree.

He first got a job as staff artiste at AIR, Kozhikode on a monthly contract. But he was terminated a few months later. He then worked as a parts-picker for TVS. He also represented India at the 1978 World Youth Festival held at Havana, Cuba, where he played Western drums, Mridangam, Tabla and also Chenda.

Prasad states that his father was instrumental in moulding his career. His father was the person who asked him to send and application to AIR, Chennai which exposed him to the thriving Carnatic music scene there. Prasad attributes all his success to his family. His wife, Usha has a doctorate in music from Chennai University and writes books on music. His son, Krishna Kishore is also a percussionist, following his father's footsteps and is part of Carnatic fusion band Zinx. Prasad has also acted in a movie, 'Oru Naal Oru Kanavu' by Fazil.

== Awards and honours ==
Prasad ji is a recipient of numerous awards and honours through the course of his career. Some of the most prestigious awards are listed below:

- Kalaimamani bestowed by the Tamil Nadu Eyal Isai Nataka Mandram (2000).
- Asthana Vidwan of the Kanchi Kamakoti Peetham (2001).
- The Kerala Sangeetha Nataka Akademi Award (2010).
- The Vani Kala Sudhakara conferred by the Thyaga Brahma Gana Sabha, Chennai (2011).
- Sangeet Natak Akademi Award for his contribution to the field of music (2012).
- Sangeetha Choodamani Award (2025).

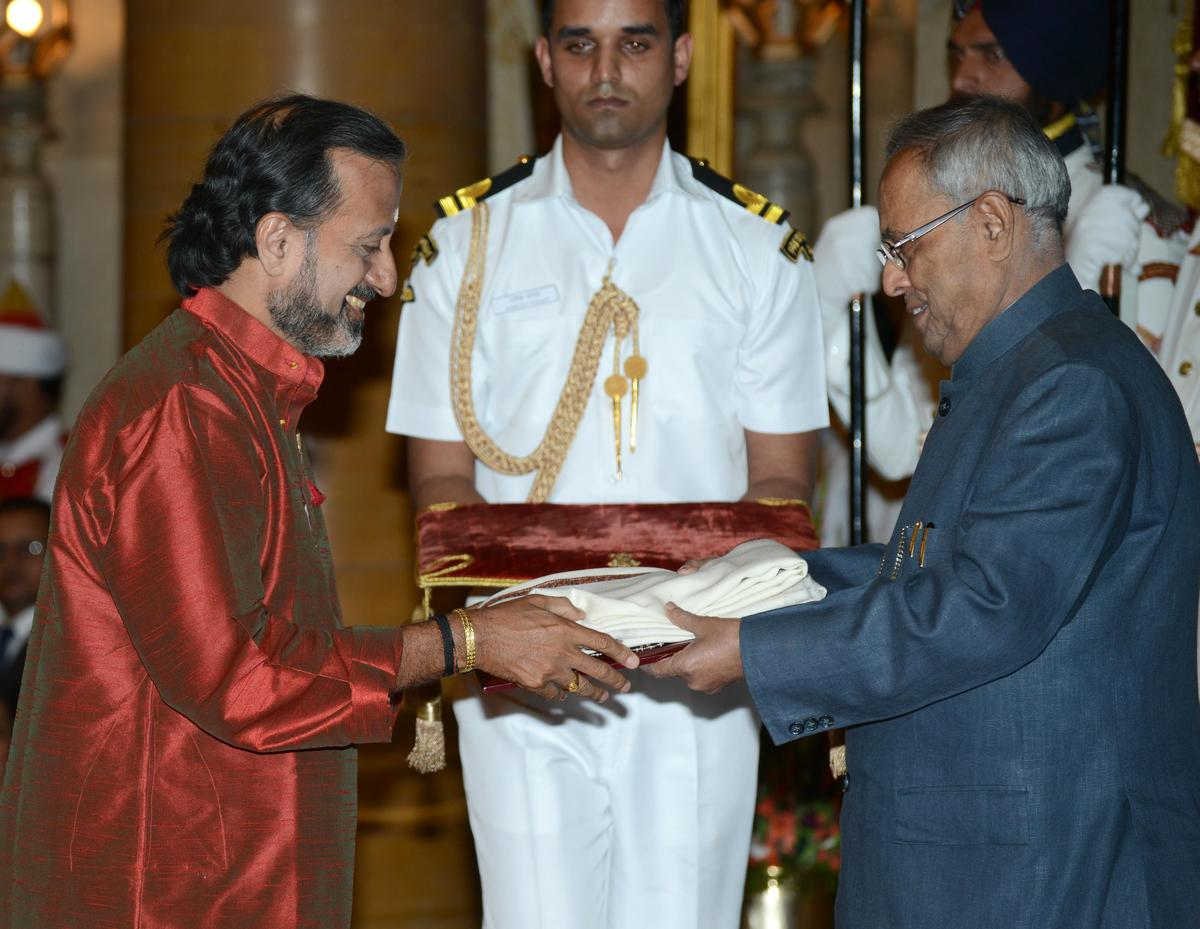
K.V. Prasad ji receiving Sangeet Natak Akademi Award from erstwhile President of India Pranab Mukherjee in 2012.
