= Mani Krishnaswami =

Indian Carnatic music vocalist (1930–2002)

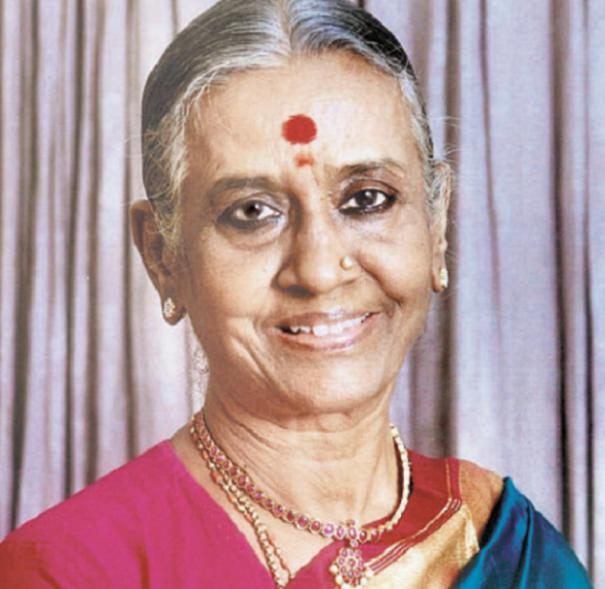
- Born: Mani Perundevi; 3 February 1930
- Died: 12 July 2002 (aged 72); Chennai, Tamil Nadu, India
- Occupation: Carnatic vocalist

Mani Krishnaswami, (also written as Mani Krishnaswamy, 3 February 1930 – 12 July 2002) was a Carnatic music vocalist of Tamil Nadu, India.

== Family ==
Her birth name was Mani Perundevi. Her father, Lakshmi Narasimhachari, was the secretary of Vellore Sangeetha Sabha. When Mani was six years of age, her mother Maragathavalli taught her to play violin. Mani's husband Krishnaswamy is an active arts promoter.

== Training in Carnatic music ==
Krishnaswami's first mentor in Carnatic music was a family musician friend named Gopaalachaari. Krishnaswami learned more than 500 songs while still a child. After completing secondary education, she enrolled for the Sangeeta Siromani course in Kalakshetra at Adayar, Chennai. At Kalakshetra she came under the influence of doyens like Rukmini Devi Arundale, Tiger Varadachariar and Papanasam Sivan.

She has the distinction of learning Carnatic music from five giants in the field, who were also recipients of the coveted Sangeetha Kalanidhi award. They are: Mysore Vasudevachar, Budaloor Krishnamurthy Shastri, Musiri Subramania Iyer, Tiger Varadachariar and Papanasam Sivan.

Mani followed the Musiri tradition. She was a key figure in popularizing the works of Musiri Subramania Iyer.

== Musical journey ==
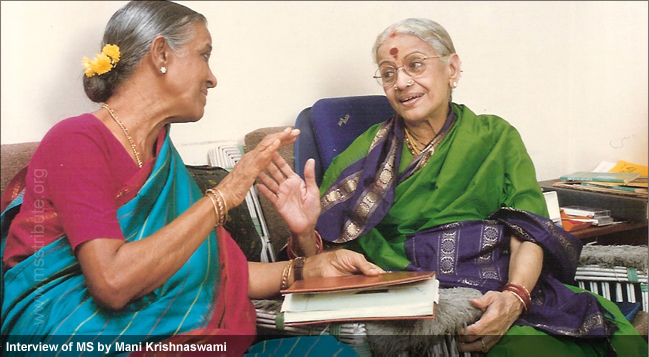
Smt.M.S.Subbu Lakshmi & Smt.Mani Krishna Swamy.

Krishnaswami was chosen by the government of India, and she performed music concerts in the Festival of India held in the then Soviet Union (1989) and in Germany (1991). She has rendered numerous music concerts both within India and in many other countries. She was a visiting faculty at San Francisco University for a short period.

Krishnaswami was the Asthaana Vidhwan at Tirumala Tirupati Devasthanams.

She rendered Desikar's Achuta Satakam in the ancient Prakrit language and set it to music.

A well-known music critic, Subbudu, commended her voice as golden and mellifluous.

== Awards ==
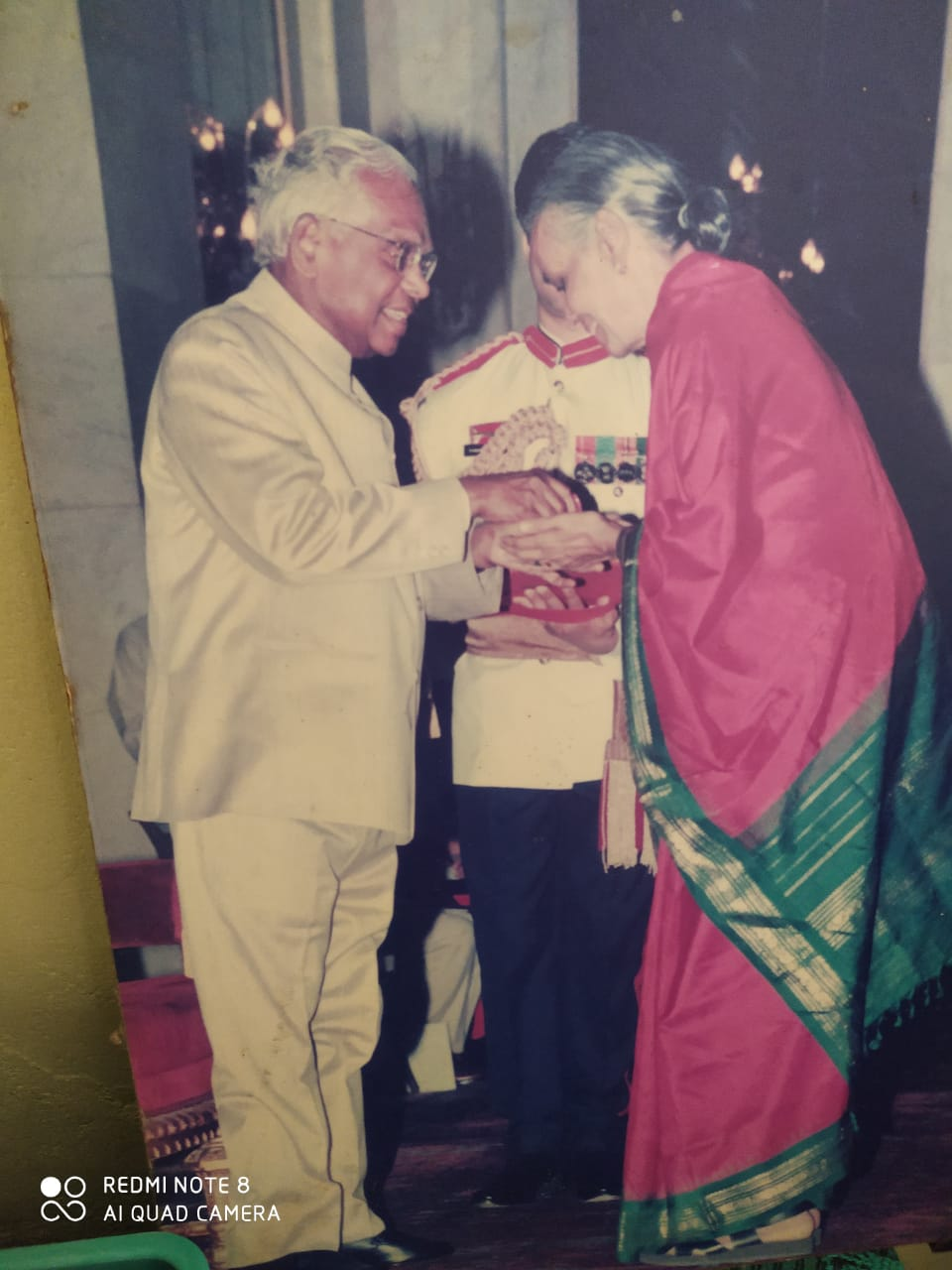
Smt.Mani Krishna Swamy Padmashri Award from President K R Narayanan in 2002

- Sangeetha Choodamani, 1979 by Sri Krishna Gana Sabha
- Kalaimamani, 1991 by Tamil Nadu State Government
- Sangeetha Kalanidhi, 1992 by Madras Music Academy
- Sangeet Natak Akademi Award, 1987 by Sangeet Natak Akademi
- Padma Shri, 2002

== Death ==
Krishnaswami died on Friday, July 12, 2002, at the age of 72 due to cardiac arrest.
