= T. V. Sankaranarayanan =

Indian musical artist (1945–2022)

Tiruvalangadu Vembu Sankaranarayanan
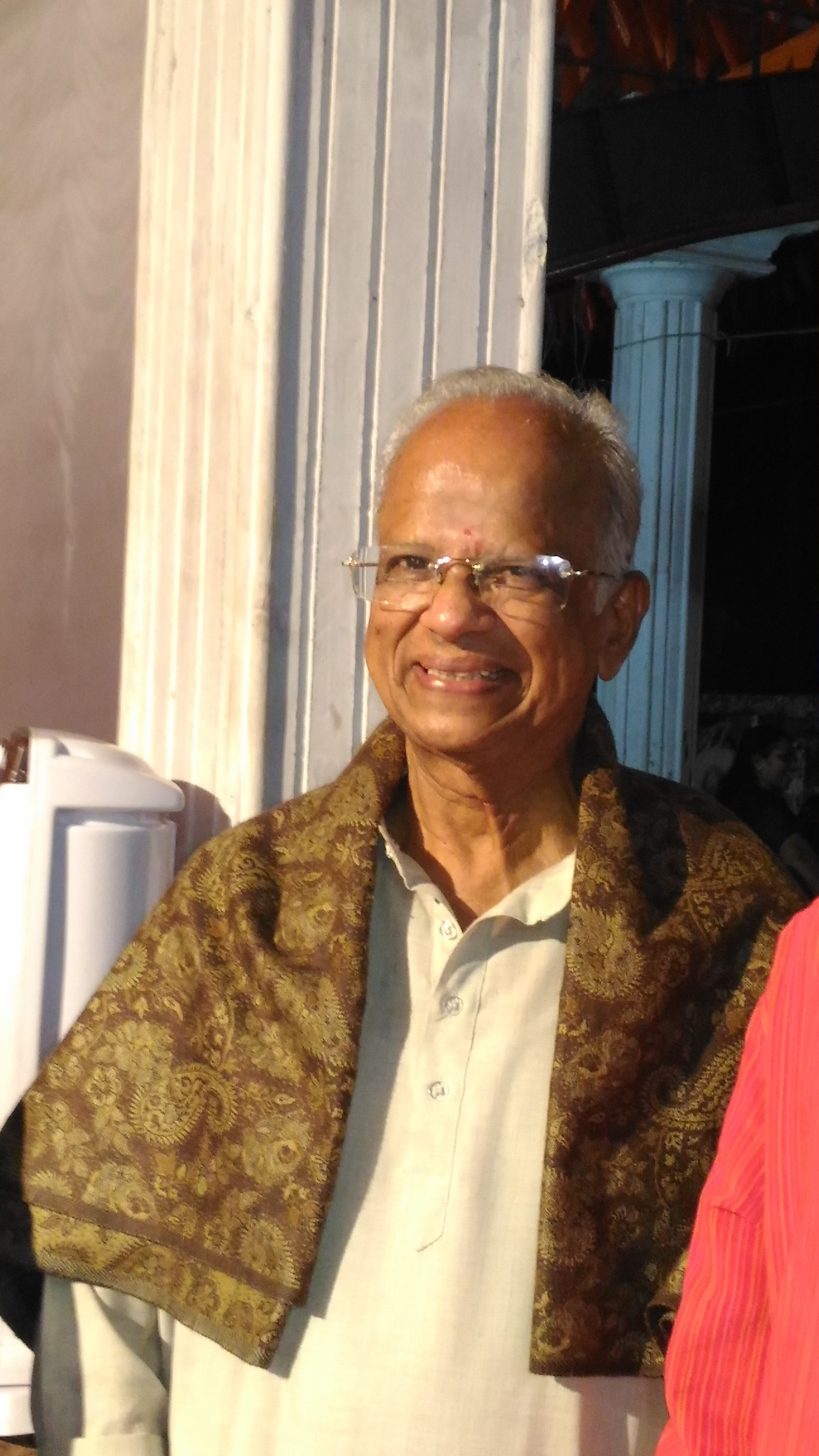

Background information
- Also known as: TVS
- Born: 7 March 1945; Mayiladuthurai, Madras Presidency, British India
- Origin: India
- Died: 2 September 2022 (aged 77) Chennai
- Genre: Indian classical music
- Occupation: Classical vocalist
- Years active: 1968–2022

T. V. Sankaranarayanan, (7 March 1945 – 2 September 2022) was an Indian Carnatic vocalist (South Indian classical singer), known for his music that stems from the style of his guru and maternal-uncle, Madurai Mani Iyer. TVS was awarded the Madras Music Academy's Sangeetha Kalanidhi in 2003.

Sankaranarayanan was particularly noted for easily reaching the upper notes.

Some of his musical disciples include R. Suryaprakash, his daughter Amruta Sankaranarayanan and his son Mahadevan Sankaranarayanan.

== Early life and career ==
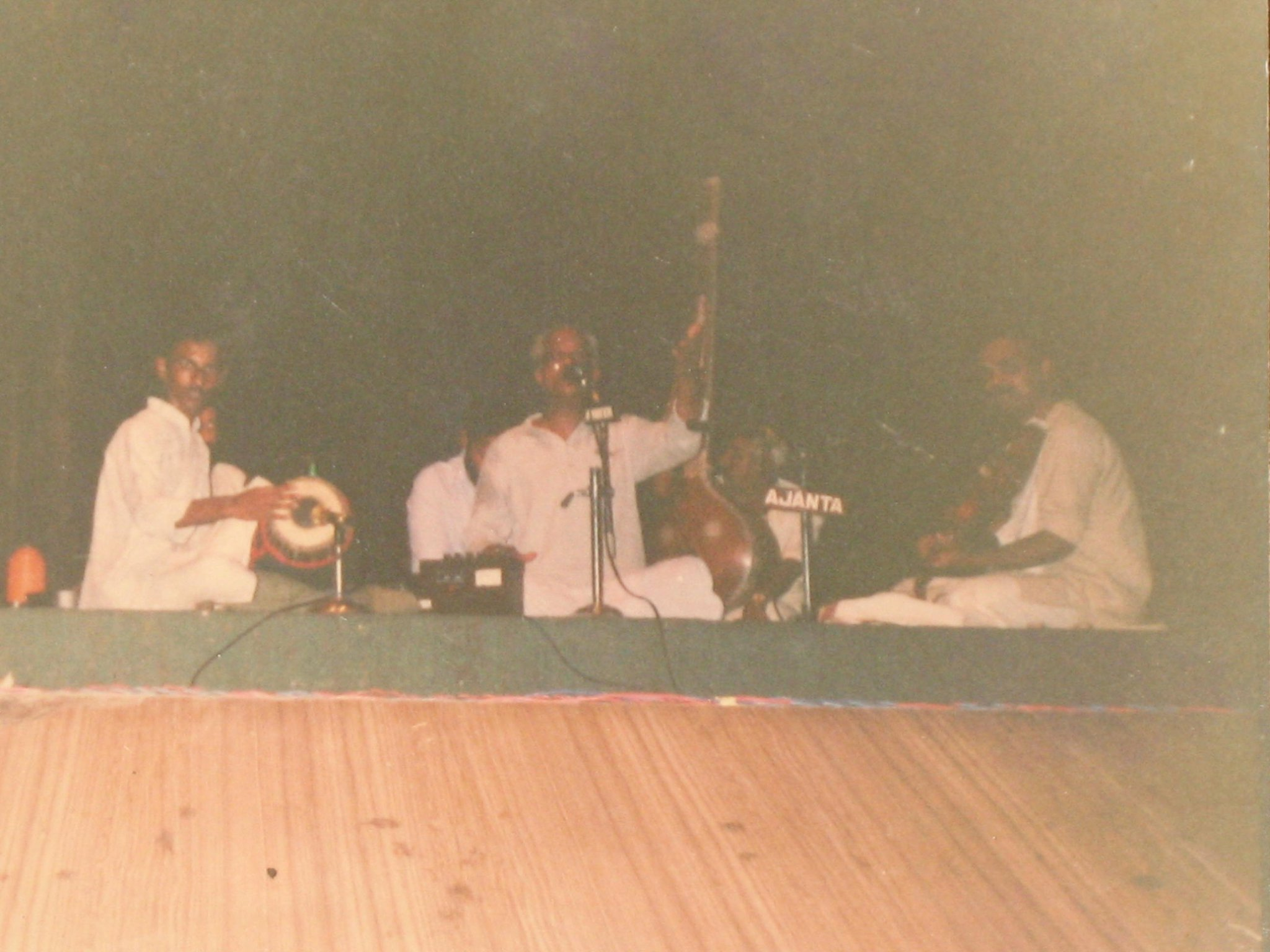
T V Sankaranarayanan sings at Trivandrum in 1995 as part of Onam celebrations organized by the Government of Kerala. N V Babunarayanan on the Violin, Erickavu N. Sunil on the Mridangam, Tripunithura Radhakrishnan on the Ghatam

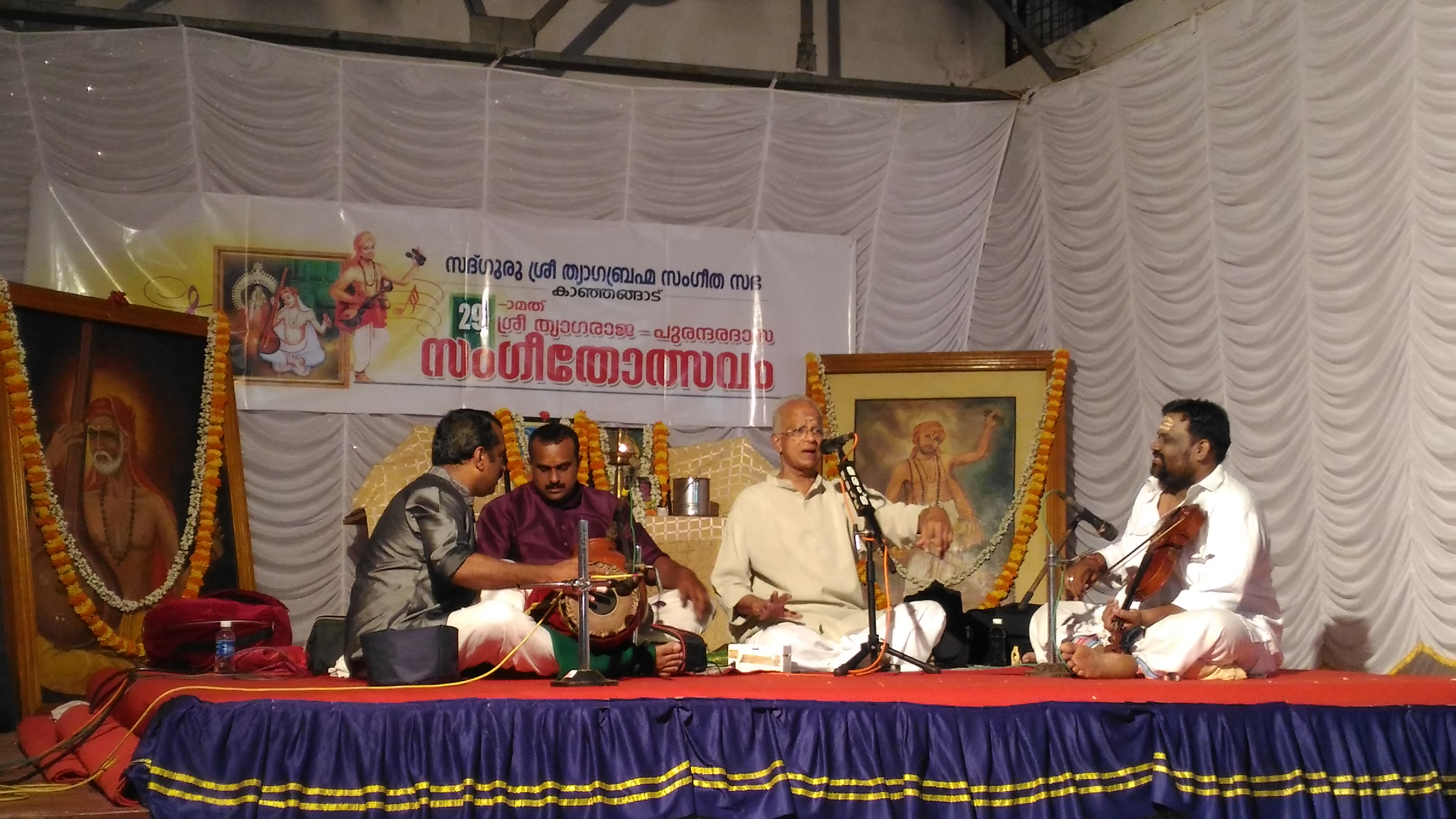
T. V. Sankaranarayanan sings at Kanhangad in Kerala on 17 February 2017 in Thyagaraja - Purantharadasa sangeetholsavam

Sankaranarayanan was born in Mayiladuthurai of Thanjavur district in the South Indian state of Tamil Nadu. His father, Vembu, was a disciple of vocalist Madurai Mani Iyer; his mother was Mani Iyer's sister. At age nine, Sankaranarayanan started learning music from his uncle (maamaa). Sankaranarayanan also learned from his father.

He made his debut on the concert platform in 1968 and then gradually established himself as a Carnatic vocalist. He has performed in India and abroad and has several albums. In a profile published in the Financial Express, Subbudu, a music critic, once wrote: "Sankaranarayanan is indeed an asset to the Carnatic music world, where the tribe of good vocalists is dwindling."

== Awards and honours ==
- Gayaka Sikhamani by Bhairavi, USA in 1981
- Swara Laya Ratnakara by Ramakrishnananda Saraswati of Sri Vidyasram, Rishikesh in 1986
- Ganakalaratnam by Dr. Semmangudi Srinivasa Ayyar in 1987
- Nadakanal By Nadakanal, Madras in 1987
- Innisai Perarasu By Bharati Kalamandram, Toronto in 1981
- Sangeetha Ratnakara By Vassar College in 1975
- Swara Yoga Shironmani By Yoga Jivana Satsangha (International)in 1997
- Sangeet Natak Akademi Award in 1990
- Padma Bhushan by the Government of India in 2003
- Sangeetha Kalanidhi by the Madras Music Academy in 2003
- Sangeetha Kalasikhamani by The Indian Fine Arts Society in 2005
- Vidhya Tapasvi by TAPAS Cultural Foundation in 2012

== Image Gallery ==
Stages in concert

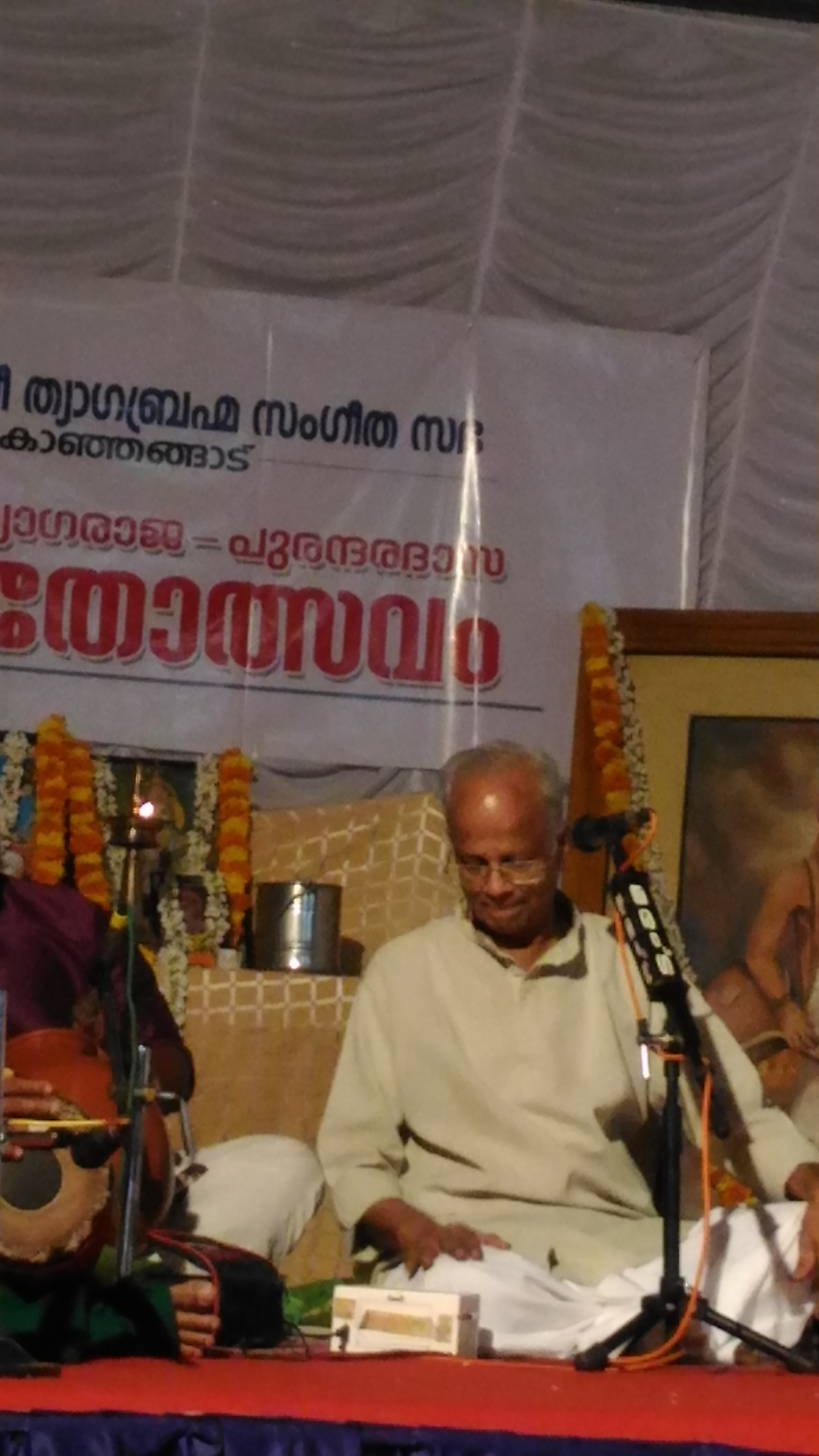

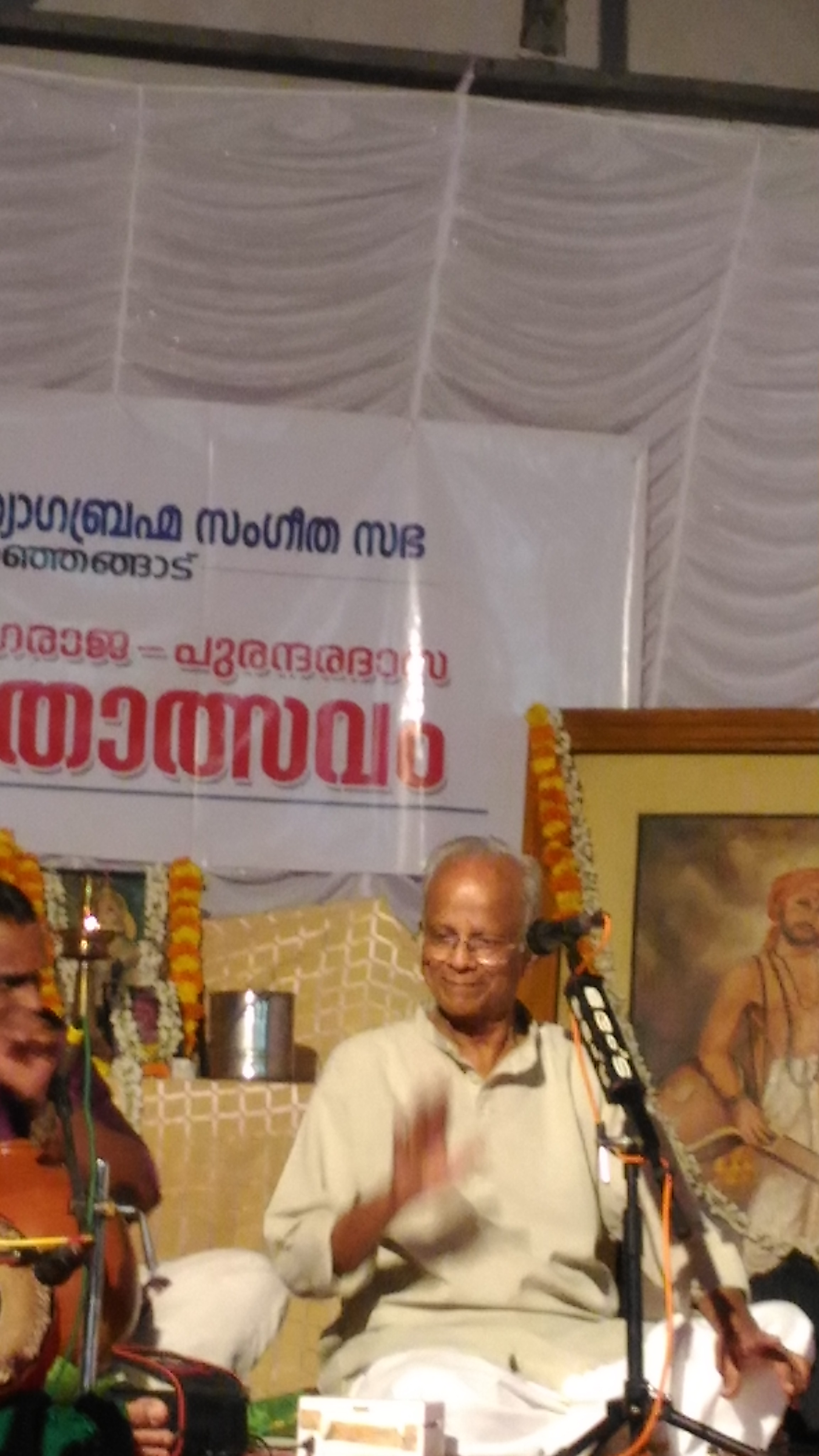

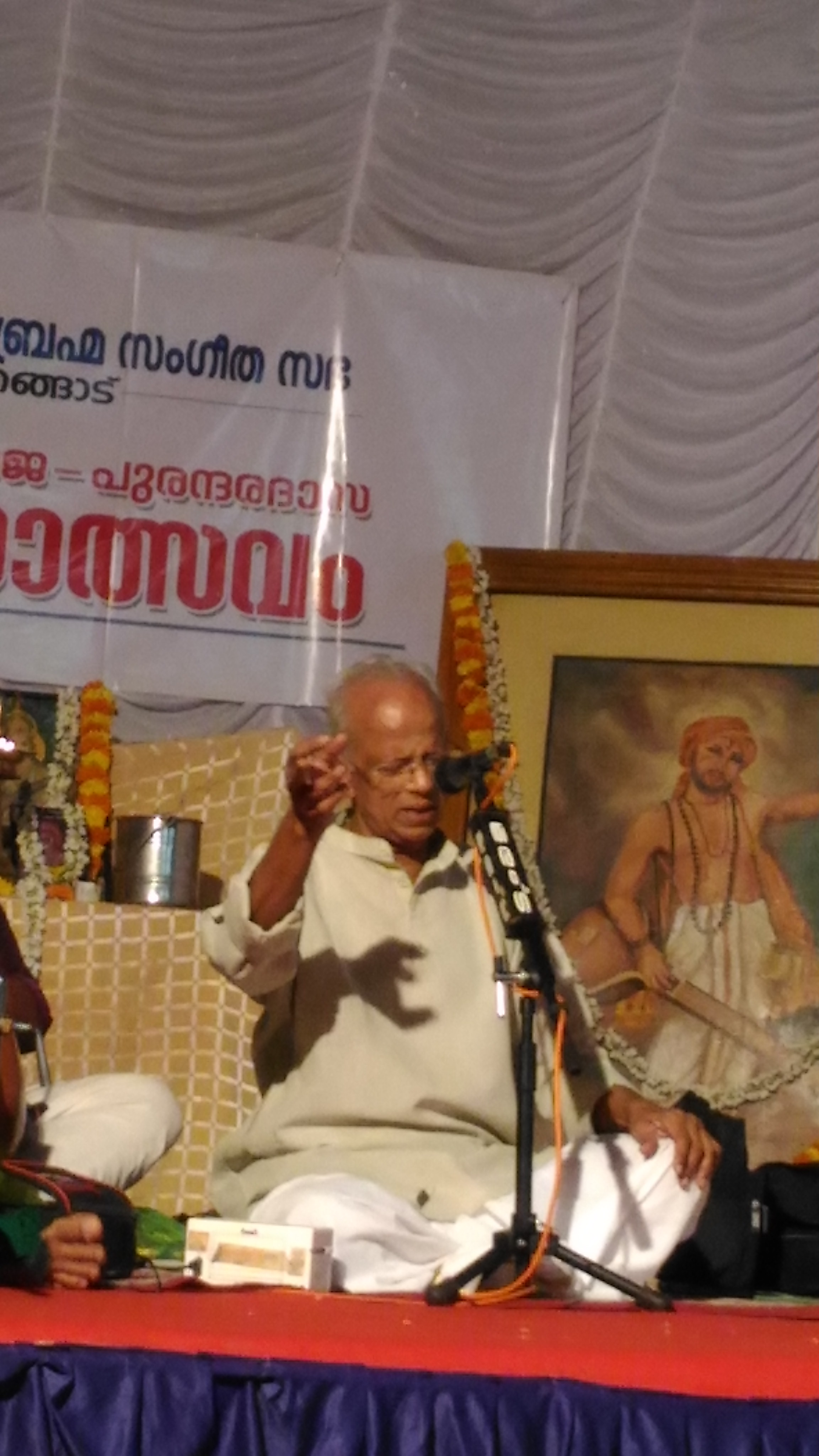

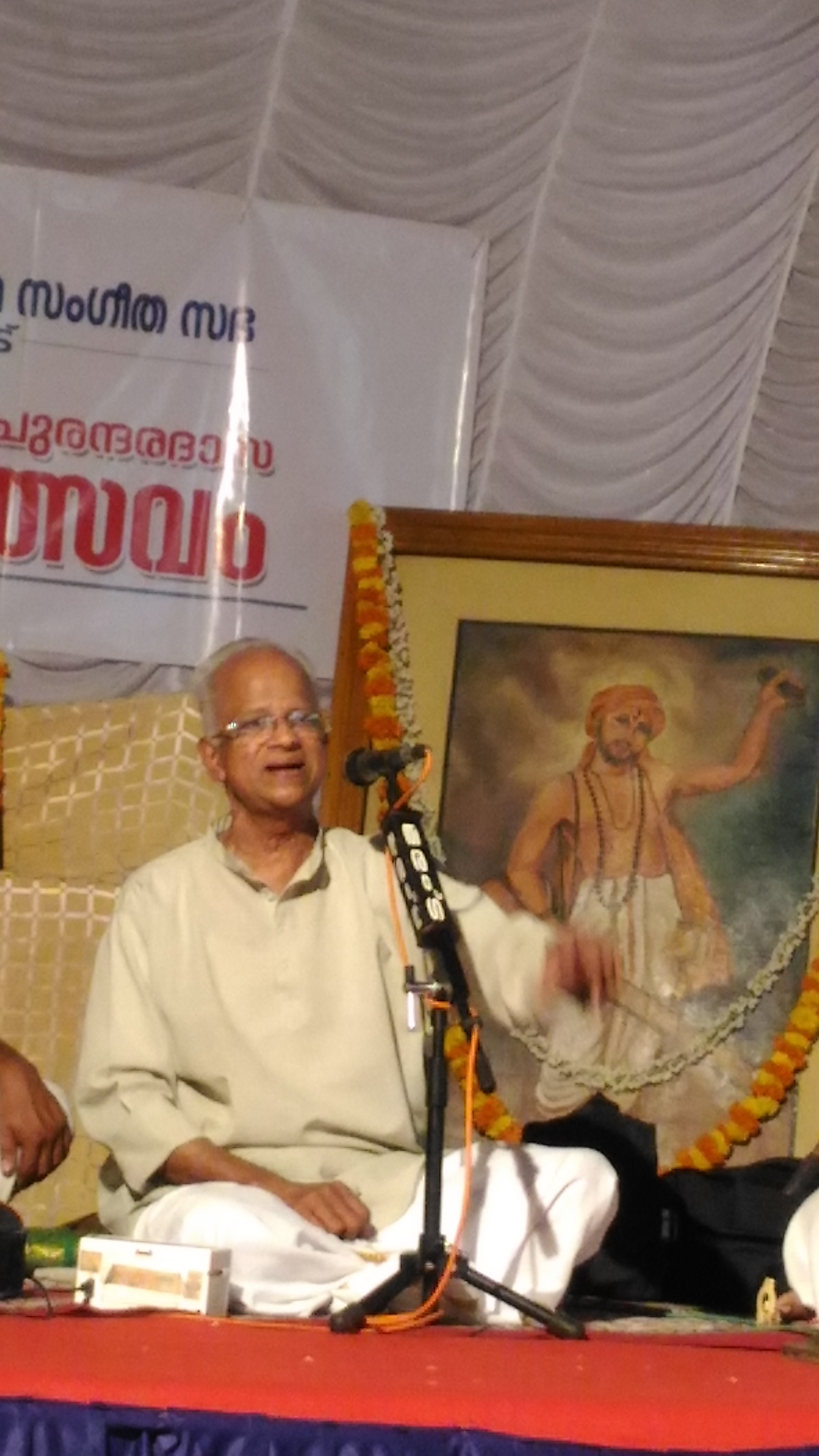

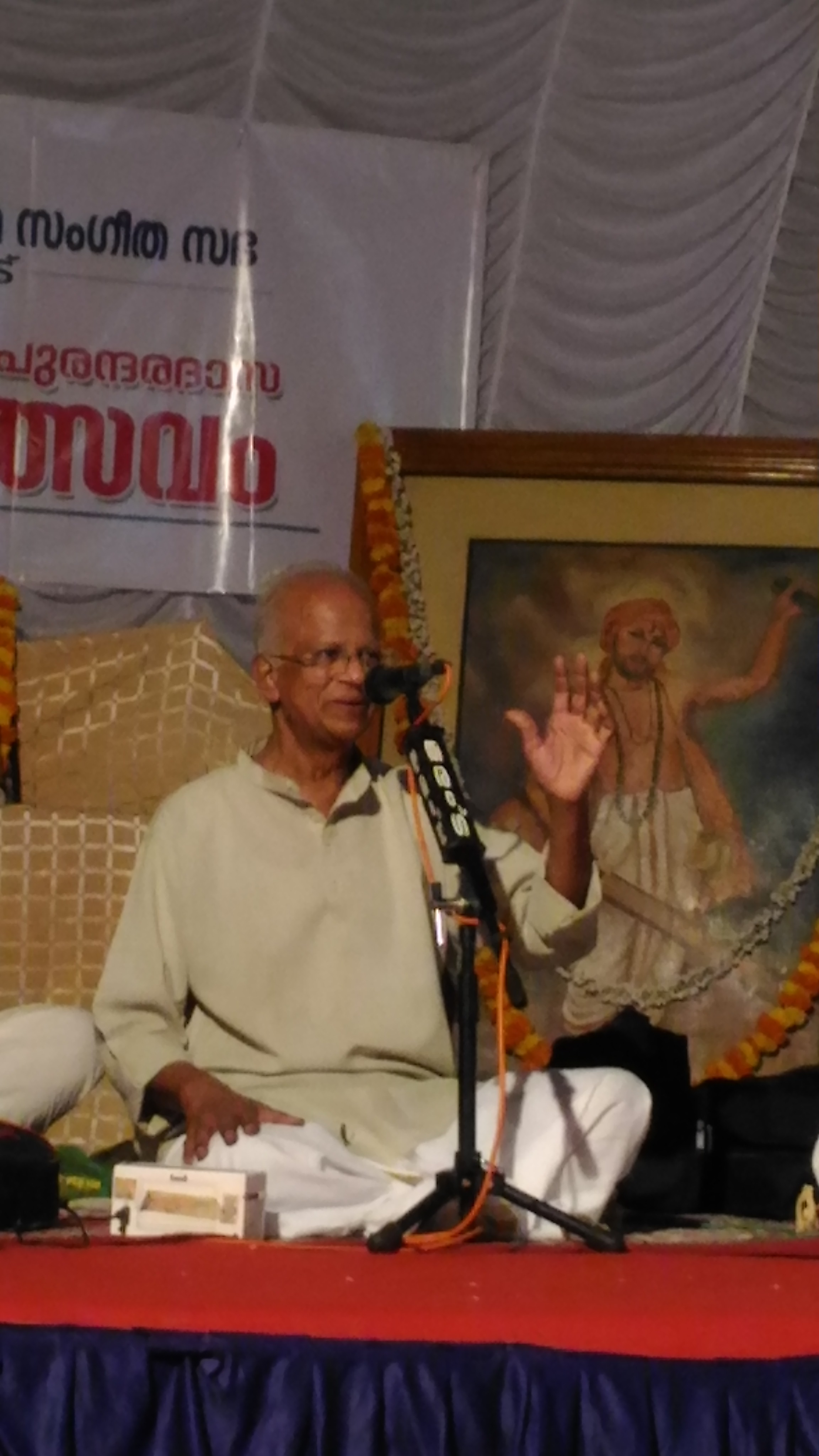

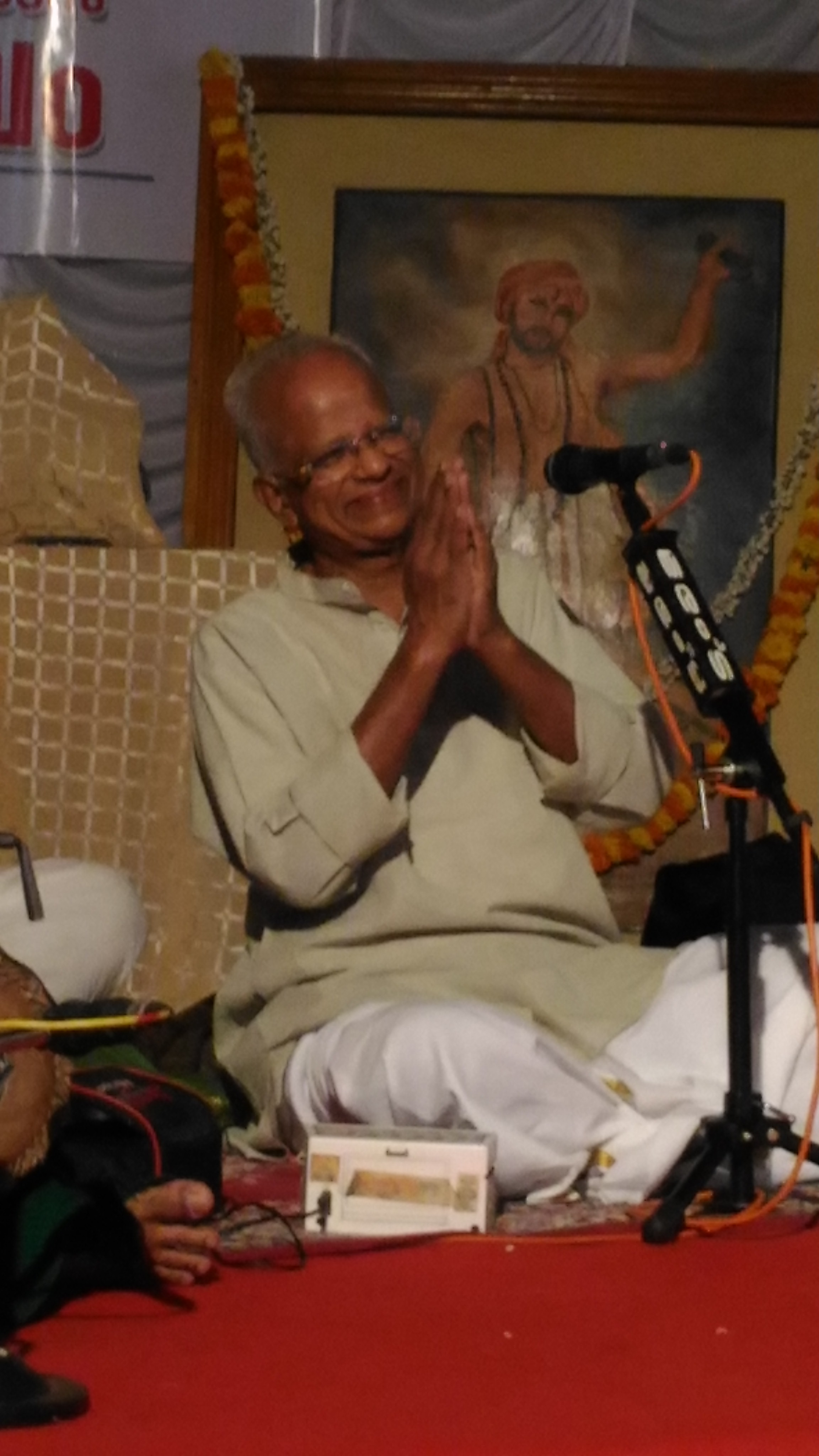
