= Nataka Kalasarathy =

Nataka Kalasarathy (Tamil: நாடக கலாசாரதி), is the title awarded annually by Parthasarathy Swami Sabha to a dramatist. It confers a shawl, a citation, a medallion with a cash purse of Rs. 5,000

== Recipients ==
- 2002 Sudharani Raghupathy
- 2003 K.S. Nagarajan
- 2005 S. Ve. Shekher
- 2006 Raadhu
- 2007 Koothapiran
- 2008 Y. Gee. Mahendra
- 2009 Crazy Mohan
- 2010 A.R. Srinivasan
- 2011 Kovai Padhu
- 2012 T. V. Varadarajan
- 2014 T D Sundarrajan
- Kathadi Ramamurthy
