= Raadhu =

Indian Tamil theatre artist

Raadhu ( - 2009) was a veteran theatre artiste in Tamil Nadu. He was a former RBI employee, later he had been involved with the theatre for over five decades and played 47 plays and over 4000 shows across the State. He was bestowed with Kalaimamani from the Government of Tamil Nadu, Nataka Kalasarathy, Nataka Kala Sironmani and Nataka Rathna are but a few titles that he gathered for his service to the theatre. Kalyanathil Galatta, one of his more popular plays was staged on several occasions. Raadhu is featured in Limca Book of Records for the drama marathon, for staging plays for over 36 hours at a stretch.
