= Margazhi Raagam =

- Directed by: Jayendra Panchapakesan
- Produced by: C Srikanth, Aghal Films in association with Real Image Media Technologies Pvt. Ltd.
- Cinematography: P. C. Sreeram
- Edited by: Satissh Kurosowa
- Release date: 19 December 2008
- Country: India

Margazhi Raagam is a Film/Carnatic music concert performed by Bombay Jayashri and T.M. Krishna, two leading artists in the field. The film is significant because it is considered to be the first of its kind in the Carnatic music world.

== Concept ==
Margazhi Raagam was conceptualised by Jayendra Panchapakesan a pioneer of the South Indian ad film making industry. The film follows a 'concert' format, with the artistes performing on a stage, but uses video styles to give the audience a multi-directional view of the stage and set.

On the official website, Jayendra says: "For over four years, I have been living with the idea of giving Carnatic music an evocative new appeal in terms of presentation. Finally, the technology became available to give this dream the right shape. Margazhi Raagam brings together two things that are close to my heart – music and cinema! I am sure that classical music and cinema will see the benefit of this initiative, as will artistes and music lovers."

Along with him a number of leading technicians have participated in the creation of this film. Some of whom are H. Sridhar - Audiography, P.C. Sreeram - Cinematography, Rajeevan - Art Direction, and Satissh Kurosowa - Editing which has awed South Indian audiences and is set to release in theatres across the globe in the months to follow.

== Technology ==
Margazhi Raagam is significant for the fact that it uses the digital capture quality of the Red One camera and high-quality, uncompressed, six track surround sound to deliver audio clarity and audio mixing finesse that carnatic music audiences have not experienced in a live concert so far.

The film is also expected to be released in Blu-ray, DVD and Audio CD formats in the near future.

== Experience ==
The experience offered by this film is the first of its kind. Viewers have mentioned that they were overcome with emotion while watching the film.
