= Oru Naal Oru Kanavu =

- Poster
- Directed by: Fazil
- Written by: Gokula Krishnan (dialogues)
- Story by: Fazil
- Produced by: K. Muralidharan; V. Swaminathan; G. Venugopal
- Starring: Srikanth; Sonia Agarwal
- Cinematography: Anandakuttan
- Edited by: T. R. Sekhar; K. R. Gowri Shankar
- Music by: Ilaiyaraaja
- Production company: Lakshmi Movie Makers
- Release date: 26 August 2005
- Running time: 140 minutes
- Country: India
- Language: Tamil

Oru Naal Oru Kanavu (transl. One day, one dream) is a 2005 Indian Tamil-language romantic drama film directed by Fazil. Srikanth and Sonia Agarwal play the lead roles, music was by Ilaiyaraaja and it was shot by Anandakuttan. The film was released on 26 August 2005. The film's title is based on a song from Kannukkul Nilavu, also directed by Fazil.

== Plot ==
The story revolves around Maya, a college student, who always wants to triumph in all her endeavours. She comes across a middle-class youth, Cheenu, a happy-go-lucky-youngster, who strives to work hard to get his sisters married well.

A few encounters result in wordy duels between them leading to Maya challenging Cheenu that she will make him fall in love with her. Her further course of action to achieve her challenge leaves Cheenu frustrated and he decides to take revenge on her by pretending to fall in love with her.

Maya, who starts to spend more time with Cheenu discovers his kindness and eventually develops an honest love towards him. She even helps him in setting his own business house. Slowly Cheenu too realises Maya's nobleness and generosity and falls in love with her.

Trouble comes in the form of her brothers who threaten Cheenu of dire consequences. Cheenu resolves to earn more and become rich and then hold the hands of Maya. But Maya has other plans. Whether or not the couple marries forms the rest of the story.

== Cast ==
- Srikanth as Srinivsan (Cheenu)
- Sonia Agarwal as Mayadevi (Maya)
- Nizhalgal Ravi
- Madhupal as Sekhar
- Remya Nambeesan as Vanaja
- Saranya Mohan as Meera
- Sudha as Cheenu's mother
- Ilavarasu as Rajamani
- Sridevi as Vasanthi
- Suvarna Mathew as Maya's sister
- Bombay Gnanam
- K.V. Prasad as Srikanth's father
- Sathyan as Kumara
- Shyam Ganesh
- Kadhal Sukumar as Saravana
- Scissor Manohar as Broker
- Nellai Siva
- Thadi Balaji
- Jolly Joseph as Doctor

== Production ==
The film was initially shot by Selvaraghavan with Dhanush and Sonia Agarwal. Part of the film was shot in Ireland. Selvaraghavan later left the film and Fazil replaced him while Srikanth replaced Dhanush. The filming was held at Ernakulam, Pollachi and Chennai.

== Soundtrack ==
The soundtrack was composed by Ilaiyaraaja. The song "Kaatril Varum" is based on Kalyani raga. The song "Khajuraho" is based on Keeravani raga.

Song	Singers	Lyrics
"Enna Paattu Venum"	Sonu Nigam	Palani Bharathi
"Ilamaikkoor Vegam"	Sonu Nigam	Vaali
"Kaatril Varum Geethame I"	Bhavatharini, Shreya Ghoshal, Sadhana Sargam, Hariharan	Vaali
"Kaatril Varum Geethame II"	Shreya Ghosal, Bhavatharini	Vaali
"Kaatril Varum Geethame III"	Ilaiyaraaja	Vaali
"Khajiraho Kanavil"	Hariharan, Shreya Ghoshal	Palani Bharathi
"Konjum Thira"	Shreya Ghoshal, Sonu Nigam	Vaali
"Ponnukitta Mappilai"	Manjari, Tippu, Chorus	Vaali

== Reception ==
Chennai Online wrote "'Oru Naal' may not have reached the standard of Fazil's earlier films like 'Poove Poochoodava', 'Poovizhivasaliley' or 'Kadhalukku Mariyathai'. The twists and surprises are milder here, and the narration a bit slow paced. But it's a film the family wouldn't mind watching together without any sense of embarrassment". The Hindu wrote, "Fazil, who has always been known for his plausible, well-etched storyline and screenplay, slips towards the end. Whatever happened to the ace maker of `Kannukkul Nilavu' and `Kadhalukku Mariyadhai,' in the second half?". Lajjavathi of Kalki wrote director brought the one-and-a-half-line story to the shooting spot by hand, pulled a bit here and there like bubble gum, and patiently delivered in two and half hours. GU of Deccan Herald wrote, "One doesn’t expect a film like Oru Nal Oru Kanavu from Fazil. It is a silly love story and the treatment is shoddy. He has tried out a new combination, Srikanth and Sonia Agarwal, but from scene one it is clear they are a mismatch".
