= Parthasarathy Swami Sabha =

Parthasarathy Swami Sabha is a Carnatic music Sabha in the city of Chennai, India. It is one of the oldest of its kind in existence. Sabha has instituted three annual awards: Sangeetha Kalasarathy for a musician, Natya Kalasarathy for a dancer and Nataka Kalasarathy for a dramatist. It also confers best performer awards for young talents were given for Vocal, Violin, Mrudangam two awards on each category who performs during the December Music Festival. The Sabha also has confers two awards The Palghat Mani Iyer Centenary Award, instituted by Nithyashree Mahadevan and M.L. Vasanthakumari Award, instituted by Sudha Raghunathan

== History ==
The Parthasarathy Swami Sabha was founded by Manni Thirumalachariar in 1900. The sabha acquired its first permanent venue, the site of a cremation ground, in 1959. In 1962, the sabha constructed an open-air theatre.
