= Bombay Jayashri =

Indian Carnatic musician (born 1964/65)

Jayashri Ramnath
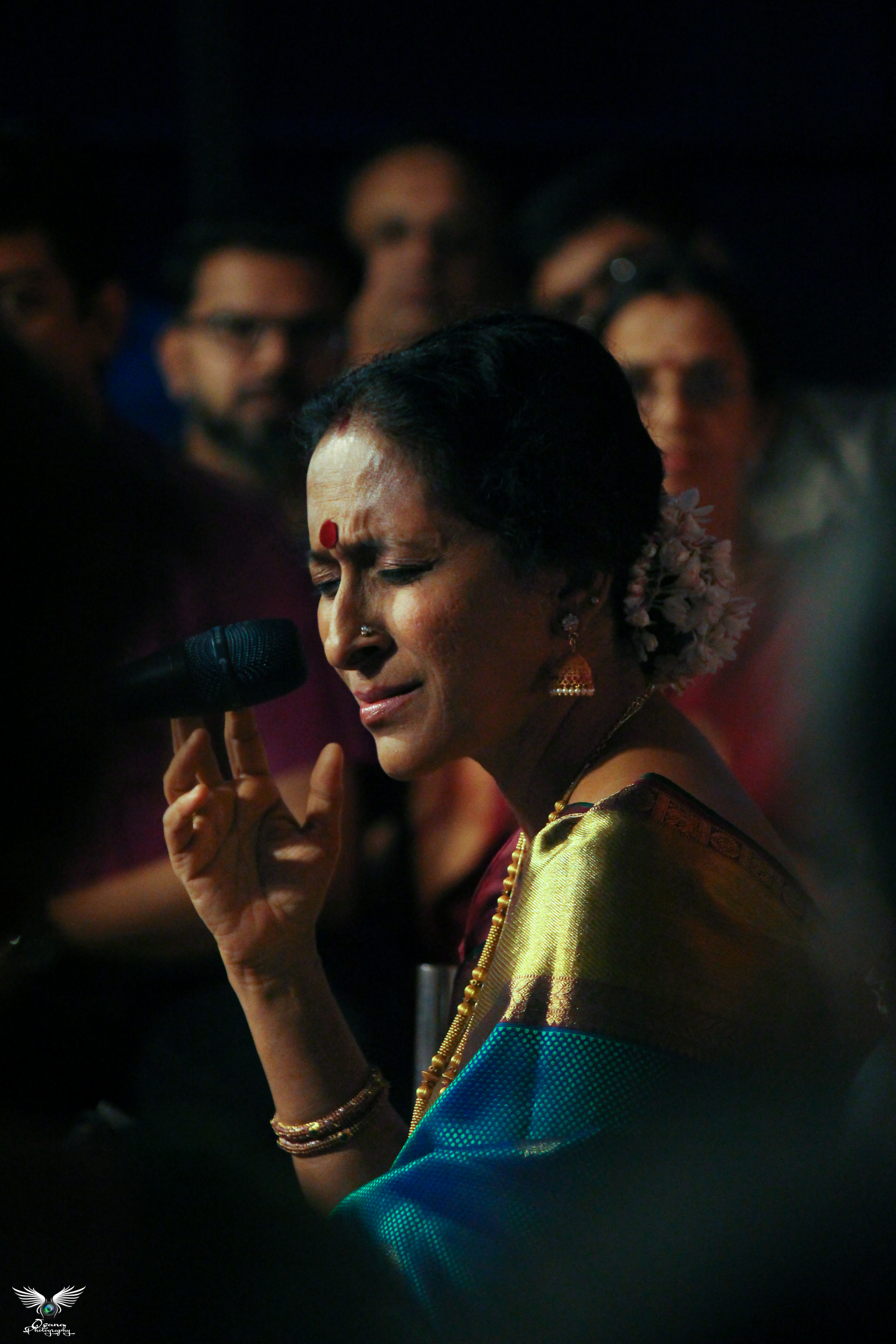
- Jayashri plays a concert at the PJ Civic Centre Auditorium, Malaysia
- Born: 2 December 1964 or 1965 (age 61–62); Calcutta, West Bengal, India
- Education: R. A. Podar College
- Occupations: Singer; Musician; Teacher; Dancer; Philanthropist
- Years active: 1982–present
- Known for: Carnatic singing
- Awards: National Film Award; Tamil Nadu State Film Award for Best Female Playback; Vijay Award for Best Female Playback Singer; Filmfare Award for Best Female Playback Singer – Tamil; Asianet Film Awards; Mangalampalli Balamurali Krishna Award; Kamban Pugazh Award
- Honours: Sangeetha Choodamani (2005); Kalaimamani Award (2006); Sangeetha Kalasarathy (2007); Honorary Doctorate (2009); Padma Shri (2021); Sangeetha Kalanidhi (2023)
- Musical career
- Genres: Carnatic; Indian classical; Playback singing; Hindustani; Filmi; Bhajan
- Instruments: Vocals, veena
- Website: bombayjayashri.com

Jayashri Ramnath, known professionally as Bombay Jayashri, is an Indian Carnatic vocalist, singer, and musician. She has sung songs in multiple languages, including for Tamil, Telugu, Kannada, Malayalam, Hindi and English movies. Trained by Lalgudi Jayaraman and T.R. Balamani, She was awarded India's fourth highest civilian award, the Padma Shri, in 2021. In December 2023, she received the Sangeetha Kalanidhi, by the Madras Music Academy. She was nominated for an Academy Award for Best Original Song (Oscar) for Pi's Lullaby from Life of Pi movie.

== Early life and training ==
Jayashri was born into a Tamil-speaking family in Calcutta. She received her initial training in Carnatic music from her parents, Smt. Seethalakshmy Subramaniam and Shri. N. N. Subramaniam, and was later trained by Lalgudi Jayaraman and T. R. Balamani. She also learned to play the Veena from G. N. Dhandapani Iyer.

Jayashri received training in Hindustani classical music from K. Mahavir Jaipurwale and Ajay Pohankar. She also holds a diploma in Indian music from the Gandharva Mahavidyalaya, Delhi.

Jayashri studied Bharatanatyam under Guru K. Kalyanasundaram Pillai of Shri Rajarajeshwari Bharatha Natya Kalamandir, Mumbai. She was also involved in theater with the Amateur Dramatic Club, Mumbai.

Jayashri attended St. Anthony's High School in Chembur. She holds a bachelor's degree in commerce and economics from R. A. Podar College, Mumbai

== Performances ==
Jayashri performed her first concert in 1982. She has performed at various festivals and venues all across India and in over 35 different countries. In India, she has performed at all the major festivals. In New Delhi: Rashtrapati Bhavan, Vishnu Digambar festival, Gandharva Mahavidyalaya, Sri Shanmukhananda Sabha, India International Centre, Indira Gandhi National University, and Bhakti Utsav. She has performed also at Saptak, Ahmedabad; The Music Academy and Sri Krishna Gana Sabha, Chennai; ITC Sangeet Research Academy, Kolkata;NCPA and Sri Shanmukhananda Sabha, Mumbai; Chowdiah Memorial Hall and Vasantha Habba, Bangalore; Kuthira Malika and Soorya Festival, Trivandrum, The Palace of Mysore and at the Matrimandir Amphitheatre at Auroville. Across India, she has performed for the Spirit of Unity Concerts for National Integration, the SPIC MACAY Festivals, and All India Radio's Sangeet Sammelan.

In the US, she has performed at the Lincoln centre for the performing arts, Carnegie hall, Kennedy Centre for performing arts World Music Institute – New York; University of Arizona – Tucson; University of Texas – Austin; MIT – Boston; University of Louisiana – New Orleans; Cornell University and Amherst College. She also has performed in the Sydney Opera house (The first carnatic Musician to perform there).

Jayashri's Europe tours have included venues such as: Sadler's Wells and Queen Elizabeth Hall – London; Festival of Sacred Voices and Museum Rietberg – Switzerland; Vantaa Festival and The Russian Opera House – Helsinki, Finland; Théâtre de la Ville, Festival of Nantes, The Museum of Sculpture and Arts, Musee des Asiatiques and Citi de la Musique – in France; Casa da Musica a Porto – Portugal; Sala de Camera – Spain and at the University of Cologne.

She has also performed at The Royal Opera House – Durban, Monash University – Melbourne and Esplanade Theatre – Singapore.

On 19 September 2017, she performed at Roy Thomson Hall in Toronto, Canada, with the Toronto Symphony Orchestra as they gave the world premiere of Mychael Danna's "Life of Pi" suite.

Jayashri has been supporting SPIC MACAY since more than three decades. She has travelled to many places in India including remote places in Uttarakhand, hill districts of Himachal Pradesh, Port Blair, rural and tribal areas of Wayanad and Idukki in Kerala, Goa and many other places to perform hundreds of Lecture Demonstrations to students, introducing them to the Indian classical music.

== Musical collaboration ==
=== Musical exchanges and dialogues ===
Jayashri has performed Jugalbandi concerts with Hindustani Musicians Ronu Majumdar, Shubha Mudgal, Vishwa Mohan Bhatt and Gaurav Mazumdar. She has dialogued with artistes in dance like Leela Samson, Chitra Visweshwaran, Alarmel Valli, Priyadarsini Govind and Shobana. Jayashri has sung Thirukkural and an Annamacharya verse in the prestigious audio autobiography – Wings of Fire of former President Shri Abdul Kalam.

Jayashri has also collaborated with Carnatic Musicians T. M. Krishna, Jayanthi Kumaresh and Abhishek Raghuram.

She performed in 'Bhaire Baanvari', the story of Meera, conceptualised and directed by Gowri Ramnarayan. She also was a part of 'Mathemagician' with actor V Balakrishnan and written by Gowri Ramnarayan. Jayashri also performed at the MTV Coke Studio (India) Season 1 with Ustad Rashid Khan and Richa Sharma.

Jayashri also conceptualised 'Listening to Life' – A concert that features the journey of a musician as a lover of music.

=== Cross cultural collaboration ===
Her quest to interact and experiment with various forms of music has resulted in collaborations with various eminent artistes from around the world. Jayashri has sung two Sangam Period songs, Veral Veli (A Kuruntokai poem by Kapilar) and Yaadhum Ure in the album 'Sandham: Symphony Meets Classical Tamil', an international collaboration of various artists and Durham Symphony by Composer Raleigh Rajan. Yaadhum Ure song, a multi genre fusion where Bombay Jayashri sang Carnatic portions along with various international singers was declared the theme song of 10th World Tamil Conference. The album was featured in Amazon's Top#10 International Albums category in July 2020.

She has sung with Egyptian singer Hisham Abbas and Senegalese singer Thione Seck. In 2008, she was part of an Indo-Finnish venture 'Red Earth and Pouring Rain', where she sang Kuṟuntokai – ancient poems from Sangam literature – with Avanti, conducted by John Storgards set to music by Eero Hämeenniemi. This was premiered at Helsinki and was also performed at Lapland. In 2012, she sang the poetry of Mirza Ghalib composed by Eero Hämeenniemi at the Vantaa festival, with the Gamba quartet led by Markku Luolajan-Mikkola, Finland. The performance was also held at Hungary. In 2014, she worked with Eero Hameenniemi in Yadhum Oore, Sangam Poetry and performed with Finnish Philharmonic orchestra.

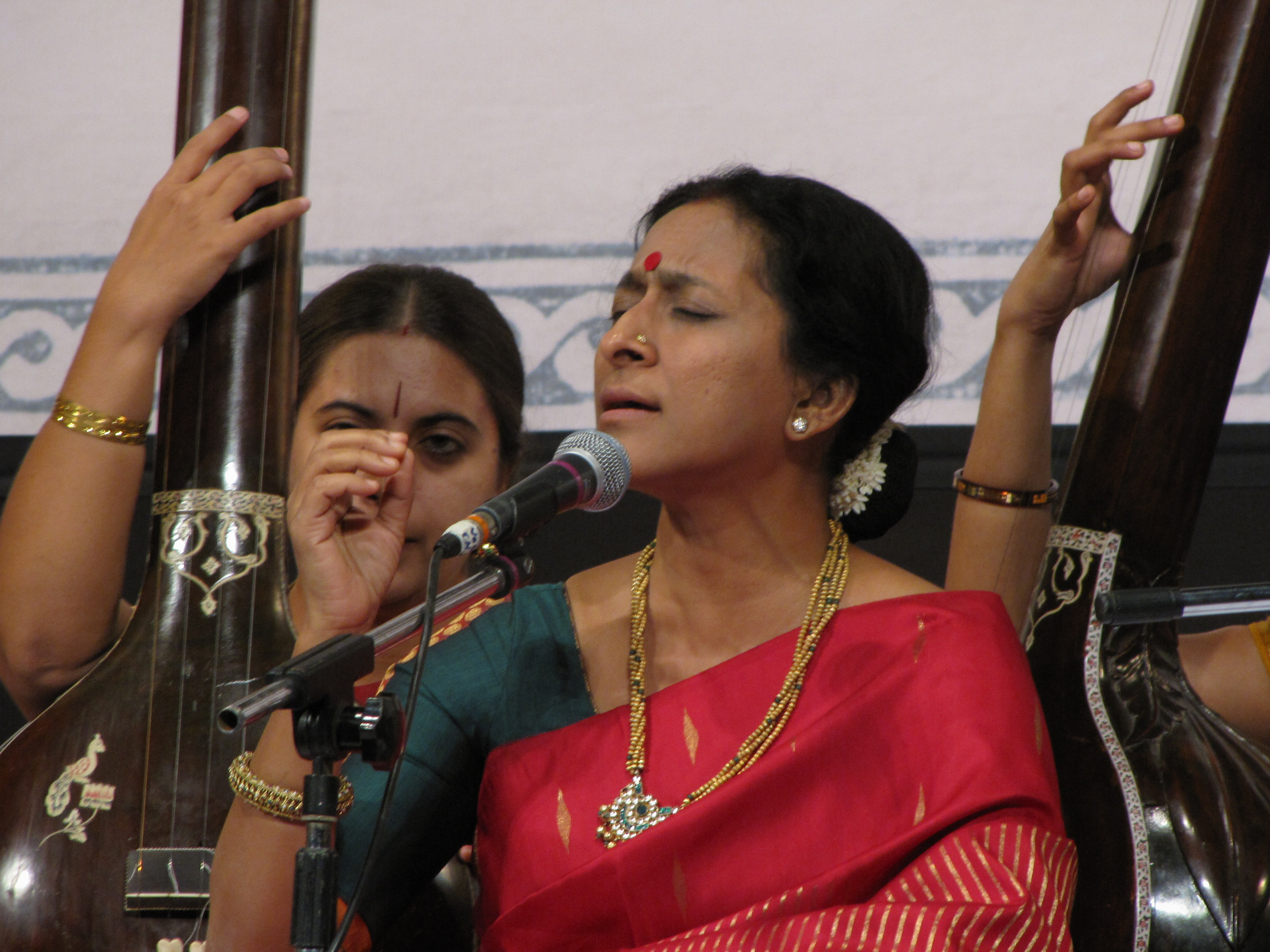
Jayashree in concert

=== Film music ===
Jayashri is also a playback singer whose film music includes Collaborations with M S Vishwanathan (Tampathigal), Ilayaraja, A.R.Rahman, M M Keeravani, Johnson, Oesappachan, M Jayachandran, Ramesh Narayan, Haris Jayaraj, Shankar-Ehsan-Loy, Imman, Yuvan Shankar Raja, Govind Vasantha. Her song for Harris Jayaraj won her the Filmfare Awards South for Best Female Playback Singer – Tamil for the popular song "Vaseegara" from the Tamil film Minnale. She sang the song "Zara Zara Bahakta Hain" (the Hindi version of "Vaseegara") in the movie Rehnaa Hai Terre Dil Mein with music composer Harris Jayaraj.She sang in Mahesh Dattani's 'Morning Raga' for the music of Amit Heri. She has sung in various films in Hindi, Tamil, Bhojpuri, Kannada, Telugu and Malayalam languages. She collaborated with composer Mychael Danna on "Pi's Lullaby" from the film adaptation of Yann Martel's book Life of Pi in 2012.

=== Music composition ===
She has composed music for Kalidasa's Meghadootham, choreographed by Sheejith Nambiar and Parvathy menon, produced by Aim for Seva. She has composed the music for Meera- Soul Divine, choreographed by Chitra Vishweshwaran, produced by Aim for Seva. Jayashri worked with Ang Lee on his motion picture, Life of Pi. She performed the lyrics for "Pi's Lullaby", which was nominated for the 2012 Oscars in the Best Original Song category. She has also composed music for actor Revathi's films Verukku Neer and Magal in Kerala Cafe. In 2004, Jayashri composed music for Silappadhikaaram, a dance drama commissioned by the Cleveland Cultural Alliance. She has composed music for her albums, Shravanam, Smaranam and more.

=== Passing on an inheritance ===
In 2001, Jayashri, along with Sanjay Subrahmanyan and T. M. Krishna wrote the book 'Prof. Sambamoorthy, the visionary musicologist', detailing the life and times of Prof. Sambamoorthy – eminent Indian musicologist. The book was published to commemorate his centenary. In 2007, Jayashri, T. M. Krishna – leading Carnatic vocalist and Mythili Chandrasekar – Senior Vice-president at JWT together wrote the book Voices Within, – a one-of-a-kind coffee table book that captures the pioneering spirit of 7 of the greatest Carnatic masters of the previous generations.

Jayashri featured in the first full-length Carnatic music film 'Margazhi Ragam', conceptualised by Director P Jayendra. The movie, released in 2008, used innovative technologies for video and sound recording. In her quest to broaden the reach of her music, she along with T. M. Krishna and YACM initiated Svanubhava – a week-long Music Festival, exclusively for students of music, which continues to be conducted annually.

=== Giving-back ===
Another dimension of music which Jayashri is focused on is in exploring the therapeutic and healing value of music. Under her Trust Hitham she shared music with Children in the Autism Spectrum. She and her students teach music at Swami Dayananda School at Manjakudi. She has been working closely with institution like Kilikili, Sampoorna in Karnataka and Sankalp in Tamil Nadu which care for autistic children. This domain is a matter of serious engagement for Jayashri and her students. Some other institutions that Jayashri has worked with include: The Banyan Chennai (rehabilitation of homeless/mentally challenged women), Vasantha Memorial Trust (cancer patients), Stepping Stones Orphanage Home, Malaysia, Multiple Sclerosis Society of India, Bangalore and more.

== Awards and recognition ==
- 2001 – Filmfare Award for Best Female Playback Singer – Tamil for the song 'Vaseegara' from the movie Minnale
- 2005 – 'Sangeetha Choodamani Award' from Dr. A C Muthiah from Sri Krishna Gana Sabha, Chennai in the presence of her Guru Lalgudi Jayaraman
- 2005 – Tamil Nadu State Film Award for Best Female Playback Singer - "Suttum Vizhi" (Ghajini)
- 2007 – Sangeetha Kalasarathy award from Sri Parthasarathy Swami Sabha, Chennai, conferred by the Vanamamalai Mutt pontiff Ramanuja Swamigal
- 2006 – Kalaimamani Award from the Government of Tamil Nadu
- 2008 – Vijay Award for Best Female Playback Singer for the song 'Yaaro Manathilae' from the movie Dhaam Dhoom
- 2013 – Nominated for Academy Award for Best Original Song (Oscar) for Pi's Lullaby from Life of Pi, 2013
- 2021 - Nominated, SIIMA Award for Best Female Playback Singer for "Hey Nijame" from Enai Noki Paayum Thotta
- 2021 - Padma Shri, by the Government of India
- 2019- Rama gana kalaacharya award from ramseva mandali Banglore
- 2023 - Sangeetha Kalanidhi title by the Madras Music Academy. The award is presented in Chennai, at the inauguration of the December music season (Margazhi), Sangeet Natak Akademi Award.
- 2024 - Best Female Playback Singer award (70th National Film Awards)for the Malayalam movie Saudi Vellakka.

== Controversies ==
The relatives of Malayalam poet Irayimman Thampi and the Irayimman Thampi Smaraka Trust alleged that the lyrics penned by Bombay Jayshree for "Pi's Lullaby", which was nominated for an Oscar in the Best Original Song category for the 2012 film Life of Pi, were copied from Thampi's lullaby Omanathinkal Kidavo. Jayashri had rendered 'Omanathinkal Kidao' in a Malayalam version back in 2001 on her album Vatsalyam.

== Discography ==
- Smaranam: Song of the Soul (2010, Inreco)
- Confluence of Elements (2007, Saregama)
- Kannamma (2007, Rajalakshmi Audio)

== Film playback singing ==
=== Album Songs ===
- Arivum Anbum
