= Sangeetha Kalasarathy =

Sangeetha Kalasarathy (Tamil: சங்கீத கலாசாரதி) is the title awarded yearly by Parthasarathy Swami Sabha a Carnatic music expert. It carries a shawl, a citation, a medallion and a cash purse of Rs. 5,000.

== Recipients ==
- Balamuralikrishna in 102nd annual music festival
- Aruna Sayeeram in 105th annual music festival
- Bombay Jayashri in 107th annual music festival
- Neyveli Santhanagopalan in 108th annual music festival
- Nithyasree Mahadevan in 110th annual music festival
- S. Sowmya in 111th annual music festival
- P. Unnikrishnan in 112th annual music festival
