= Eero Hämeenniemi =

Finnish composer, musician and writer (born 1951)

Eero Olavi Hämeenniemi
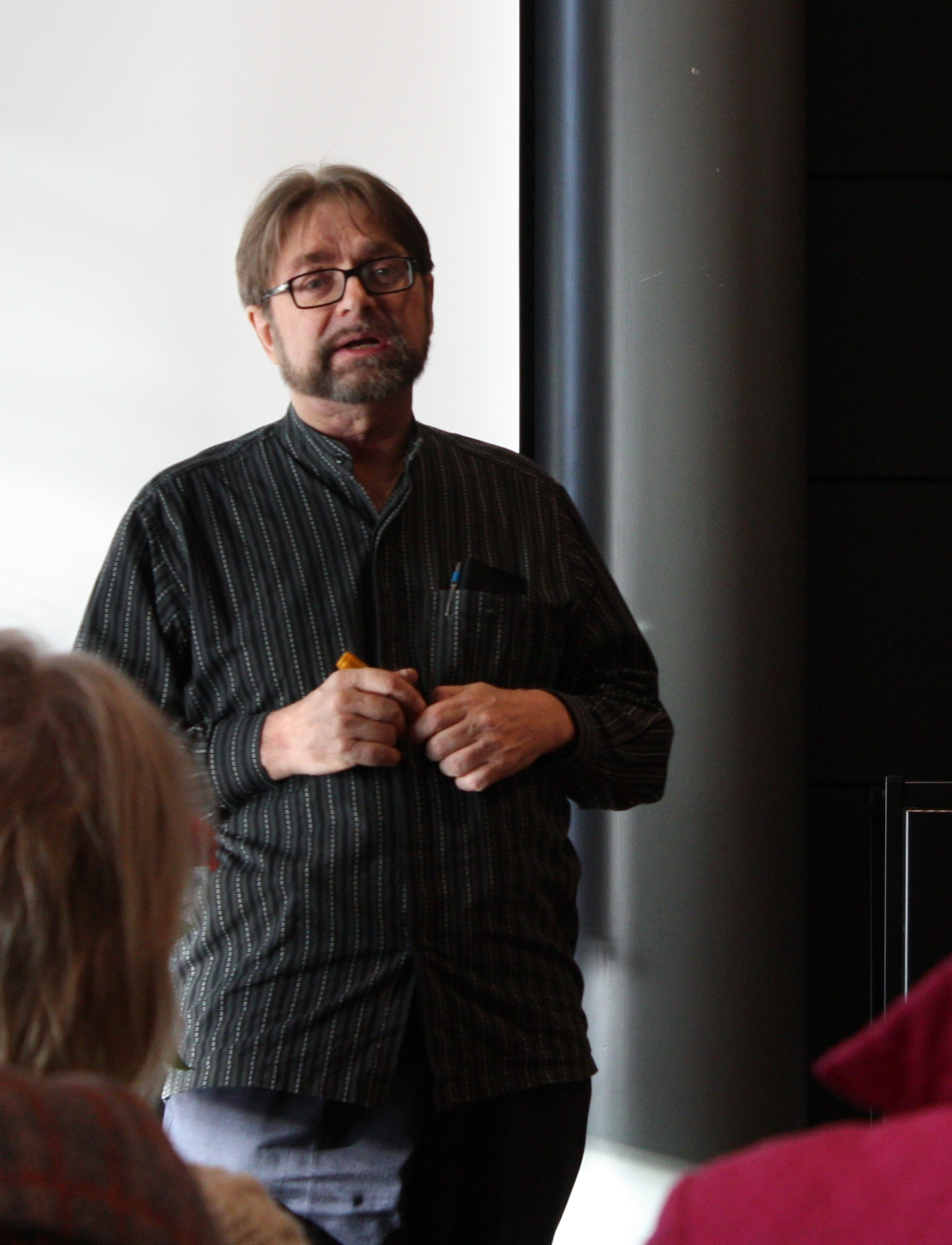
- Born: 29 April 1951; Valkeakoski
- Occupations: Composer, musician and writer

Eero Olavi Hämeenniemi (born 29 April 1951) is a Finnish composer, musician and writer. He was born in Valkeakoski. He is an adjunct professor at the University of the Arts Helsinki and he has played and recorded solo improvisation concerts.

Hämeenniemi has written several books about South Indian music culture and translated Tamil poetry. Recently he has written a book on South Italy: Napolista etelään (2021) and another, Kulkija Venetsiassa (2022), on the musical orphanages of Venice.

== Selected works ==
World premiere details shown where available

- Symphony no. 3 (1999) (Finnish Radio Symphony Orchestra, cond. Sakari Oramo, 3 November 1999, Helsinki)
- Symphony no. 2 (1988) (Finnish Radio Symphony Orchestra, cond. Jukka-Pekka Saraste, 31 August 1988, Helsinki)
- Symphony no. 1 (1983) (Finnish Radio Symphony Orchestra, cond. Leif Segerstam, 18 April 1984, Helsinki)
- Viola Concerto (2001) (viola: Tommi Aalto, Finnish Radio Symphony Orchestra, cond. Sakari Oramo, 12 October 2001, Helsinki)
- Red Earth and Rain (2007), Bombay Jayashri, Avanti chamber orchestra, 2008, Helsinki
- Yaadum uuree (2013), Bombay Jayashri, HKO, cond. John Storgårds, 2013 Helsinki
- Klarinetiseikkailu (2020), Lauri Sallinen, Saimaa Sinfonietta, cond. Erkki Lasonpalo, 2021, Lappeenranta
