= Chamarajpet =

Chamarajpet Chamarajapet
- Neighbourhood
- Location within Bengaluru
- Coordinates: 12°57′N 77°33′E
- Country: India
- State: Karnataka
- Metro: Bengaluru
- Established: 1892
- Named for: Chamaraja Wodeyar

Government
  - Type: Municipal Corporation
  - Body: Bruhat Bengaluru Mahanagara Palike

Languages
  - Official: Kannada
- Time zone: UTC+5:30 (IST)
- PIN: 560018
- Vehicle registration: KA02

Chamarajpet is a locality in central Bangalore. It is bordered by Basavanagudi, Banashankari, Chickpet, Binnypete, Byatarayanapura and K. R. Market.

Chamarajpet is one of the oldest areas in Bangalore, 2.9 km. from Bangalore City Railway Station and BMTC and 37.1 km. to Kempegowda International airport. The main commercial street of Chamrajpete is the Bazar Street, the continuation of which is Bull Temple Road.

Chamarajpet was founded in 1892 and the 125th anniversary was celebrated with a three-day festival in 2017.

Chamarajpet houses many historical structures such as Kote Sri Prasanna Venkateshwara Swamy Temple, Fort High School, Tipu Sultan Summer Palace and Minto Hospital.

Raghavendra Colony, situated in the area, has a historical connection to the Maharaja of Mysore who visited here to meet Bengaluru's first-ever surgeon, Dr. B. D. Raghavendra Rao. Sri Sripadaraja Matha of Mulbagal is in Raghavendra Colony.

The locality got the name "Chamarajpet" because of the visit by Maharaja Chamarajendra Wodeyar. It was first named Chamarajendra Pete, which was later shortened to Chamrajpete.

The area becomes a music hub every year during the months of April and May, i.e., in the Rama Navami season. Sree Ramaseva Mandali RCT, one of the premier cultural organizations of the country, organizes an annual global music festival on the grounds of Fort High School, hosting the who's who of Indian Classical Music.

The area is also home to many manufacturers of agarbathis (incense sticks) and related items. The area is composed of five main roads and nine cross roads. There is a temple on every main road. The layout was referred to as the Chess Box Colony, given that when they were originally built, they all had square dimensions of 108 feet by 108 feet, that made it look like a chess board.

The nearest metro stations are the Krishna Rajendra Market metro station and the City Railway Station metro station. Adarsh College is a prominent educational institutions. Chamrajpete houses some hospitals and medical centers.

The headquarters of the Kannada Sahitya Parishath is also located here.
