= P. Unnikrishnan =

Indian singer

Kalaimamani P. Unnikrishnan
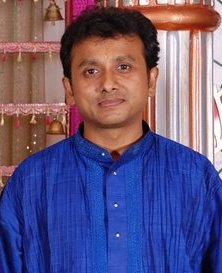

Background information
- Born: 9 July 1966 (age 60); Palakkad, Kerala, India
- Genre: Indian classical music
- Occupations: Playback Singer & Classical Singer
- Years active: 1992–present
- Award: Kalaimamani Award (1994)

Parakkal Unnikrishnan (born 9 July 1966), credited as Unnikrishnan, is an Indian Carnatic vocalist and film playback singer. His performances include a wide range of genres, like classical music, devotional music and pop music, among others. Unnikrishnan sings predominantly in Tamil and Telugu-language films in addition to Malayalam and Kannada films. He has recorded over 4,000 songs in more than 5 languages throughout his career. He has released a number of non-film albums, tele-series, devotionals and classical collaborations.

In 1994, Unnikrishnan was awarded National Film Award for his very first film songs, "Ennavale Adi Ennavale" (from Kaadhalan) and "Uyirum Neeye" (from Pavithra), thereby becoming the first male singer to have awarded in Tamil language. He is the recipient of Government of Tamil Nadu's Kalaimamani award, in 1994, for his contribution towards music. He has also won Tamil Nadu State Film Award for Best Male Playback Singer twice in the years 2001 and 2003.

== Early life and background ==
Unnikrishnan was born to K. Radhakrishnan and Dr. Harini Radhakrishnan in Palakkad, Kerala. The family home, Kesari Kuteeram, was well known in Madras city, with his great-grandfather, Dr. K. N. Kesari, being a practitioner of traditional Ayurvedic medicine and a promoter of the Telugu women's magazine Gruhalakshmi.

He went to Asan Memorial Senior Secondary School, Chennai. He later transferred to Santhome Higher Secondary School in Chennai and completed his schooling in 1984. He graduated from Ramakrishna Mission Vivekananda College, Chennai, and received his B.Com degree from the Madras University. He earned a General Law and Post Graduate Diploma in Personnel Management and Industrial Relations.

He worked as an executive in Parry's Confectionery Ltd. from 1987 to 1994, when he quit his job to become a professional singer.

== Singing career ==
Unnikrishnan was initiated into Carnatic music aged 12 by V. L. Seshadri. He was inspired by Dr. S. Ramanathan. Later, under the tutelage of Savithri Sathyamurthy, a student of Dr. S Ramanathan herself, helped Unnikrishnan become the singer. He attended a special workshop for six months on "Veena Dhanammal Bhani" under T. Brinda and T. Vishwa Nathan.

He won the National Film Award for Best Male Playback Singer for his debut film songs "Ennavale Adi Ennavale" and "Uyirum Neeye". These songs were composed by A. R. Rahman, with whom Unnikrishnan gave most of his memorable songs. He is the first male playback singer to be awarded the national award for a Tamil song. He was one of the permanent judges in the reality television show AIRTEL Super Singer on Vijay TV in seasons (2006, 2008, 2010–2011, 2013, 2015–2016, 2018) and 2008 Idea Star Singer on Asianet.

Unnikrishnan is also becoming known for his experimental work. In 2008, he presented a novel jazz concert in Thiruvananthapuram with the Eli Yamin Jazz Quartet and pianist Anil Srinivasan.He prefers singing classical songs over pop music.

In 2012, Unnikrishnan rendered a series of Devotional songs on Lord Ganesha, Lord Ayyappan, Lord Venkateswara, and Devi among others. The albums were produced by Gaananjali Recordings and were composed and released by Manachanallur Giridharan. The album titles include Ayyan Malai Engal Malai, Om Nava Sakthi Jaya Jaya Sakthi, Sabarimalai Va Charanam Solli Va, Vindhaigal Purindhai Nee En Vazhvile, jeans, and Uchi Pillaiyare Charanam. Notable among them is the Harivarasanam, part of the Ayyappa album and is the only other popular rendering after the famous K. J. Yesudas's.

== Personal life ==
Unnikrishnan is married to Priya, a Bharathanatiyam and Mohiniyattam dancer and a native of Kozhikode, Kerala. They got married in November 1994 and have 2 children – a son named Vasudev Krishna (b. 1997) and a daughter Uthara (b. 2004). Uthara won the National award for playback singing for her debut song "Azhagu" in the movie "Saivam". Both Unnikrishnan and Uthara received national awards for their debut songs.

Vasudev is passionate about cricket and is a member of the Madras Cricket Club and Life Member of the Tamil Nadu Cricket Association.

== Awards ==
- 1994: Received title of Kalaimamani Award by the Government of Tamil Nadu, which is the highest state honour in the field of Arts
- 2014: Received the Kerala Sangeetha Nataka Akademi Award for Classical Music.
- Sangeetha Kalasarathy Aaward by the Parthasarathy Swami Sabha.
- Received Nada Bhushanam, Shanmukhananda Fine Arts, New Delhi,
- Yuva Kala Bharathi, Bharat Kalachar, Chennai.
- Isai Peroli, Isayin Punnagai, Isai Selvam, Sangeetha Chakravarthy.
