= Malavika Sarukkai =

Indian Bharatanatyam dancer and choreographer (born 1959)

Kalaimamani Malavika Sarukkai
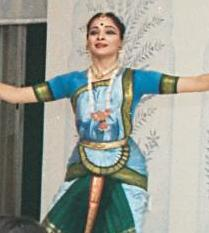
- Born: 1959 (age 66–67); Madras state, India
- Occupation: Classical dancer
- Known for: Bharatanatyam
- Awards: Padma Shri (2003),Kalaimamani (1993)

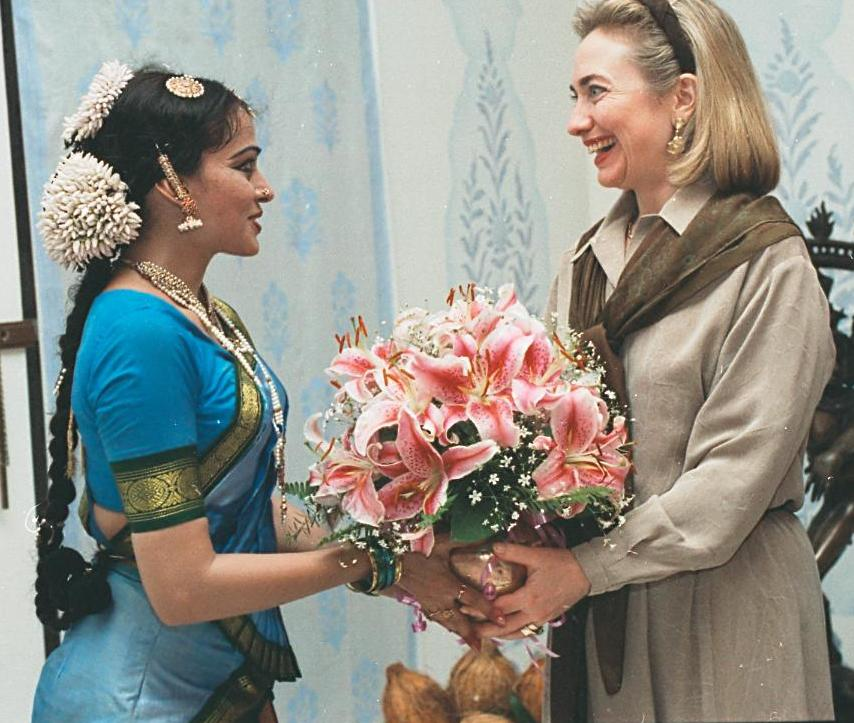
Malavika meeting United States First Lady Hillary Clinton in 1995

Malavika Sarukkai (born 1959) is an Indian classical dancer and choreographer who specializes in Bharatanatyam. She is the winner of the Sangeet Natak Akademi Award (2002). In 2003, she was awarded the Padma Shri, the fourth-highest Indian civilian award.

== Biography ==
Malavika Sarukkai was born in 1959, in Madras state, India (present day Tamil Nadu). She began learning Bharatanatyam at the age of 7 and trained under Kalyanasundaram Pillai(Tanjavur school) and Rajaratnam (Vazhuvoor School). She also studiedabhinaya under Kalanidhi Narayanan and Odissi under renowned gurus, Kelucharan Mohapatra and Ramani Ranjan Jena. She made her debut at the age of 12 in Mumbai and has performed at many places in India and abroad, including the Lincoln Center for the Performing Arts, New York, John F. Kennedy Center for the Performing Arts and at Chicago. Her life and work have been documented in Samarpanam, a film commissioned by the Government of India. She also features in a nine-hour television documentary by BBC/WNET under the title, Dancing. The Unseen Sequence – Exploring Bharatanatyam Through the Art of Malavika Sarukkai is another documentary made on her art which has been screened at the National Centre for the Performing Arts. Mumbai.

== Awards and recognitions ==
- 1993: Received title of Kalaimamani Award by the Government of Tamil Nadu, which is the highest state honour in the field of Arts.
- 2002: Honored with the Sangeet Natak Akademi Award by the Government of India.
- 2003: Awarded Padma Shri by The Government of India.
- Mrinalini Sarabhai Award,
- Nrityachoodamani title
- Sanskriti award
- The Haridas Sammelan award.

== See also ==
- Bharatanatyam
- Odissi
