= Subbudu =

Dance and music critic

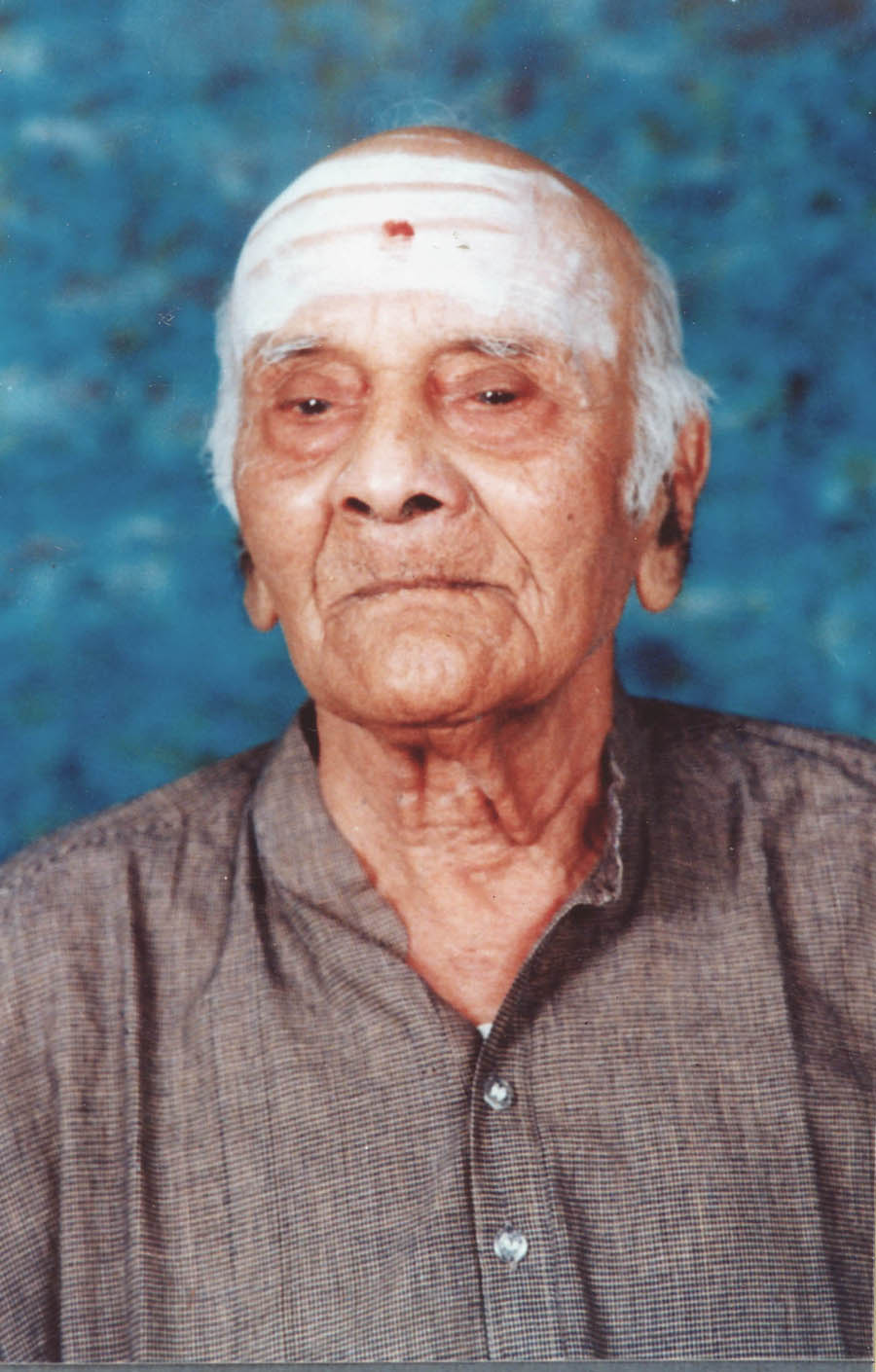
- A portrait of Shri P.V. Subramaniam 'Subbudu' was presented with the Sangeet Natak Akademi Award for Scholarship Overall Contribution in performing Arts by the President Dr. A.P.J Abdul Kalam in New Delhi on 26 October 2004
- Born: P. V. Subramaniam; 27 March 1917
- Died: March 29, 2007 (aged 90)
- Occupation: critic

P. V. Subramaniam popularly known as Subbudu (27 March 1917 – 29 March 2007) was an Indian dance and music critic.

== Early life ==
Subbudu was born in a brahmin family and spent his early life in Burma (present name Myanmar). In the wake of the World War II, under general evacuation orders by the British, his family left Burma, undertaking a long and hard journey on foot through the North-East India. In India, first he moved to Shimla and soon blossomed into a cultural critic, when he started commenting on local carnatic music soirees. Soon Kalki the Tamil magazine started by Kalki Krishnamurthy and T. Sadasivam. published his first full-fledged review. A chance meeting with V K Narayana Menon, the then deputy director of All India Radio resulted in Subbudu's appointment as dance and music critic for the newspaper The Statesman.

== Music and dance critic ==
In a career that spanned more than 50 years, Subbudu's acerbic wit and deep knowledge of music made many readers look forward to his views. But he also made many enemies. A board saying "Dogs and Subbudu not allowed," was hung outside the Madras Music Academy in Chennai during the 1980s. An example of his commenting is what Subbudu said about the doyen of Carnatic Music, Semmangudi Srinivasa Iyer: "Even the dreaded Emergency has come to an end, but there seems to be no end of Semmangudi". Madras Music Academy convened an emergency meeting to condemn Subbudu and reaffirm their faith in the greatness of Semmangudi. He was no mere wielder of an acid pen; he had deep insight into both arts—dance and music—he commented upon. For example, he compared the Hindustani and Carnatic Systems of Music and brought out strengths and weaknesses of both system in the following few words: "I am also listening Hindustani music from my birth. I am also commenting upon them in Delhi papers. I am writing without being afraid of any one. In fact, there is nothing great in Hindustani music apart from the purity of the shruti. It is because of the lack of purity of śruti that South Indian music is not perhaps appreciated in the North. Further in Hindustani music, every artist specializes in specific aspect – khayal, dhrupad, thapa, thumri etc. So far as rhythm (tala) is concerned, they are still at an elementary level".

In the early 1990s, Subbudu was the prominent critic of A. R. Rahman's syncretic music style. He lambasted the maestro for drowning the lyrics with gadgetry.

He has appeared as himself in the Tamil film Ivan.
