= Madurai N. Krishnan =

Indian musician

- Born: 31 October 1928; Madurai, Tamil Nadu, India
- Died: 9 October 2005 (aged 76); Chennai, Tamil Nadu, India
- Other name: Madurai Narayanan Krishnan Iyengar
- Occupations: Vocalist, lyricist, composer
- Known for: Carnatic music
- Awards: 1970 UNESCO Award; 1981 Kalaimamani; 1987 Sangeet Natak Akademi Award; 1992 Padma Shri; 1999 Sangeetha Kala Sikhamani; 2003 Padma Bhushan

Madurai Narayanan Krishnan (1928–2005) was an Indian musician, known for his proficiency in Carnatic music. He was known to have been proficient in all the three facets of music viz. vocals, lyrics and music and was considered by many as a Vaggeyakara. The Government of India awarded him the Padma Shri, the fourth highest civilian award in 1992 and followed it up with the Padma Bhushan, the third highest civilian award, in 2003. He was also a recipient of the Sangeet Natak Akademi Award, UNESCO Award and the Kalaimamani Award.

== Biography ==
Madurai N. Krishnan was born on 31 October 1928 in Madurai, in the south Indian state of Tamil Nadu to Narayana Iyengar, a Harikatha performer and Sanskrit scholar, in family of musicians. His elder brother, Madurai N. Srinivasa Iyengar, was a known violinist and renowned musicians, Ariyakudi Ramanuja Iyengar and Ramanathapuram Poochi Srinivasa Iyengar were relatives. His early music training were under the tutelage of his father and elder brother before his formal training at Tamil Isai School, Karaikudi. Later, he learned music under Ariyakudi for 18 years in the gurukuala way, staying at Melavoor. His debut performance was at Tirupati where renowned musicians, Palghat Mani Iyer and Vellore G. Ramabhadran performed as accompanists.

Krishnan's oeuvre includes music compositions for dances as well as for literary works such as Thiruppavai, Naalayira Divya Prabhandham and Thiruvasagam. His proficiency in the three facets of music viz. vocals, lyrics and composition earned him the moniker, Vaggeyakara. Several notable dancers including Sudharani Raghupathy and Chitra Visweswaran have performed Krishnan's compositions and he also served as the director of Shree Bharatalaya, an academy he co-founded with the former in 1965.

Krishnan died on 9 October 2005, at the age of 76, at Chennai, succumbing to kidney ailments. He was survived by four daughters, his wife having predeceased him. Shri Krishna silambam an eponym of Madurai.N.Krishnan was started by his grand daughter and disciple R.Sudhalakxmi in the year 2014.Sudhalakxmi is a research scholar, writer, bharatanatyam artist carrying forward the legacy of Madurai N Krishnan.

== Awards and honors ==
Krishnan, an 'A Top' grade artiste of the All India Radio, received the UNESCO Award in 1970 and the Kalaimamani of the Government of Tamil Nadu in 1981. He was chosen for the Sangeet Natak Akademi Award in 1988 and he received the fourth highest Indian civilian award of the Padma Shri in 1991. The Government of India followed it up with the third highest civilian award of the Padma Bhushan in 2003. In between, the Indian Fine Arts Society conferred the title of Sangeetha Kala Sikhamani in 1999. He also held the title of Gaana Padmam of the Brahma Gana Sabha.

== Awards ==
- 1970 - UNESCO Award
- 1981 - Received title of Kalaimamani Award by the Government of Tamil Nadu, which is the highest state honour in the field of Arts
- 1987 - Sangeet Natak Akademi Award
- 1992 - Padma Shri by the Government of India.
- 1999 - Sangeetha Kala Sikhamani
- 2003 - Padma Bhushan by the Government of India.

== See also ==
- List of Carnatic artists
- List of Carnatic composers
