= Sangeet Natak Akademi Fellowship =

Indian honour for the performing arts

- Award for individual contributions to Performing arts
- Awarded for: Award for the performing arts in India
- Sponsored by: Sangeet Natak Akademi
- Reward: ₹3 lakh (equivalent to ₹4.9 lakh or US$5,300 in 2026)
- First award: 1954
- Final award: 2023

Highlights
- Total awarded: 172
- First winner: Ariyakudi Ramanuja Iyengar; Karaikudi Sambasiva Iyer; Prithviraj Kapoor
- Last winner: Vinayak Khedekar; R. Visweswaran; Sunayana Hazarilal; Raja and Radha Reddy; Dulal Roy; Daya Prakash Sinha
- Website: Official website

The Sangeet Natak Akademi Fellowship, also known as Akademi Ratna Sadasyata, is an Indian honour for the performing arts presented by Sangeet Natak Akademi. It is "the most prestigious and rare honour" conferred by the Akademi and is "restricted to 40 individuals at any given time".

== Background ==
In 1945, The Asiatic Society of Bengal submitted a proposal to establish a National Cultural Trust consisting of three academies: an Academy of Music, Dance, and Drama, an Academy of Letters, and an Academy of Art and Architecture. The proposal was reconsidered in the Conference on Art held in Kolkata in 1949, and two conferences, the Conference on Letters, and the Conference on Dance, Drama, and Music, were held in New Delhi in 1951. All three conferences were organized by the Government of India and recommended the establishment of three national academies: an Academy of Music, Dance, and Drama (Sangeet Natak Akademi), an Academy of Letters (Sahitya Akademi), and an Academy of Art (Lalit Kala Akademi).

The Sangeet Natak Akademi, established on 31 May 1952 by a resolution of the Ministry of Human Resource Development (then the Ministry of Education), Government of India, headed by Maulana Abul Kalam Azad, is India's National Academy for Music, Dance, and Drama. The Akademi was officially inaugurated on 28 January 1953 by the first President of India, Rajendra Prasad and P. V. Rajamannar was appointed as its first Chairman. The first members of the Executive Board of the Akademi consisted of Maharaja Sri Sir Jayachamarajendra Wadiyar Bahadur, T. L. Venkatarama Aiyar, S. N. Mozumdar, N. R. Ray, Dharma Vira, A.K. Ghosh, J. C. Mathur, and A. V. Venkateswaran. Other two institutes were established later; the Sahitya Akademi was inaugurated on 12 March 1954 and the Lalit Kala Akademi was inaugurated on 5 August 1954. Later, on 11 September 1961, it was reorganized as a society and registered under the Societies Registration Act, 1860. Though the Sangeet Natak Akademi functions as an autonomous organization of the Ministry of Culture, its programmes are completely funded by the Government.

The Sangeet Natak Akademi is defined as "the apex body of the performing arts" in the country and primarily focuses on "preserving and promoting the vast intangible heritage of India's diverse culture expressed in the forms of music, dance and drama". The Akademi has also established various institutions in the fields of performing arts: the National School of Drama in New Delhi in 1959, the Jawaharlal Nehru Manipur Dance Academy in Imphal and the National Institute of Kathak Dance in New Delhi in 1964, and the Koodiyattam Kendra in Thiruvananthapuram in 1990. Since 1965, the Akademi also publishes a quarterly journal, Sangeet Natak.

== Description ==
Vocalist Girija Devi (right) receiving the Sangeet Natak Akademi Fellowship, 2010

The Sangeet Natak Akademi Fellowship is conferred without distinction of nationality, race, caste, religion, creed, or sex. Although it can be seen from the list of awardees that most of them are brahmins or upper caste hindus. The criteria restricts any person below the age of 50 to ordinarily be considered for the honour, although a minimum age of 35 is required. Persons who are already deceased do not qualify; if an honoree dies before the honour is conferred, however, the honour will be assigned posthumously. The criteria also excludes any institution along with the members of the General Council of the Akademi from consideration. The fellowship does not refer to any specific work or achievement of an artist but to the "significant and lasting contribution on a sustained basis over a period of time". The recommendations are received from the current fellows along with the members of the General Council of the Akademi.

The fellowship was established in 1954 and the first elected fellows were Carnatic music vocalist Ariyakudi Ramanuja Iyengar, Veena player Karaikudi Sambasiva Aiyer, and film and theatre actor Prithviraj Kapoor. As of 2015, the fellowship has been conferred upon 148 individuals, including 32 dancers, 31 theater performers, 76 musicians, and 9 individuals awarded for their overall contributions in all three fields. Since its inception, the honour has been bestowed upon 26 female artists and, in 1958, a Hindustani classical vocalist, belonging to the Bhendibazaar gharana, Anjanibai Malpekar became the first woman fellow of the Akademi. A French national and musicologist Alain Daniélou is the only non-Indian national awarded with the fellowship.

As per the constitutional provision under Rule 12 (vi) of the Rules and Regulations of the Akademi, the number of fellows is restricted to 30. On 25 March 2003, the General Council of the Akademi recommended restricting the number of fellows to 40 living persons and a total of 60 at any given time. However, the recommendation is not yet approved by the Ministry. As of 2021, there are 39 Fellows of the Sangeet Natak Akademi. Each recipient is awarded with a cash prize of ₹3 lakh (equivalent to ₹4.9 lakh or US$5,300 in 2026), an Angavastram (Shawl), and a Tamrapatra (citation plaque) given under the seal of Akademi and signature of its Chairman. There were ten recipients for the year 2019, 2020 and 2021. The most recent fellowship was announced on 27 February 2024 and awarded to six recipients for the year 2022 and 2023.

== List of fellows ==
Fellowship recipients by field
Field	Number of recipients
Dance	37
Music	90
Theater	34
Overall Contribution/Scholarship	11

Key
# Indicates a current fellow

List of Central Sangeet Natak Akademi Fellows, showing the year, and field(s)
Year	Image	Recipient	Field(s)
1954		Allauddin Khan	Music
1954		Hafiz Ali Khan	Music
1954		Ariyakudi Ramanuja Iyengar	Music
1954		Karaikudi Sambasiva Iyer	Music
1954		Prithviraj Kapoor	Theatre
1958	–	Anjanibai Malpekar	Music
1962		Gopeshwar Banerjee	Music
1962	–	D. Annaswami Bhagavathar	Music
1962		Uday Shankar	Dance
1962		Papanasam Sivan	Music
1963	–	Swami Prajnanananda	Music
1963	–	Shrikrishna Narayan Ratanjankar	Music
1963	–	Pichu Sambamoorthi	Music
1963		Mama Warerkar	Theatre
1964	–	T. L. Venkatarama Iyer	Music
1964	–	C. Saraswathi Bai	Music
1964	–	Birendra Kishore Roy Choudhury	Music
1964	–	B. R. Deodhar	Music
1964	–	V. Raghavan	Music
1964		P. V. Rajamannar	Theatre
1965	–	Vinayak Narayan Patwardhan	Music
1965	–	Ganesh Hari Ranade	Music
1965		Dilipkumar Roy	Music
1965	–	Jaideva Singh	Music
1965	–	D. G. Vyas	Music
1966	–	Ashutosh Bhattacharya	Music
1966	–	E. Krishna Iyer	Overall Contribution/Scholarship
1966		Sombhu Mitra	Theatre
1966		Jayachamarajendra Wadiyar	Music
1967		Ebrahim Alkazi	Theatre
1967		Rukmini Devi Arundale	Dance
1967		Musiri Subramania Iyer	Music
1967		Bade Ghulam Ali Khan	Music
1967	–	P. K. Kunju Kurup	Dance
1967	–	Shambhu Maharaj	Dance
1967	–	V. Satyanarayana Sarma	Dance
1967	–	Adya Rangacharya 'Shriranga'	Theatre
1968		Kali Charan Patnaik	Overall Contribution/Scholarship
1970	–	K. C. D. Brahaspati	Music
1970		Kapila Vatsyayan	Dance
1970	–	Dilip Chandra Vedi	Music
1972		Tarapada Chakraborty	Music
1972		Krishnarao Phulambrikar	Music
1972		Rallapalli Ananta Krishna Sharma	Music
1973		K. Shivaram Karanth	Theatre
1974		Kamaladevi Chattopadhyay	Theatre
1974	–	Jnan Prakash Ghosh	Music
1974		M. S. Subbulakshmi	Music
1975		T. Balasaraswati	Dance
1975		Zubin Mehta#	Music
1975	–	Rasiklal Parikh	Theatre
1975		Ravi Shankar	Music
1975	–	Embar S. Vijayaraghavachariar	Music
1976		Santidev Ghosh	Overall Contribution/Scholarship
1976		Semmangudi Srinivasa Iyer	Music
1977	–	Hirjibhai Rustomji Doctor	Music
1978	–	Tinuvengadu Subramania Pillai	Music
1978	–	B. Puttaswamayya	Theatre
1979		P. L. Deshpande	Theatre
1979		Dhruvatara Joshi	Music
1979	–	Sumati Mutatkar	Music
1979	–	T. P. Kuppiah Pillai	Dance
1980	–	V. K. Narayana Menon	Overall Contribution/Scholarship
1982		Mani Madhava Chakyar	Dance
1982		Mallikarjun Mansur	Music
1984	–	M. Kirupanandawari	Music
1984		Chandravadan Mehta	Theatre
1984		Siyaram Tiwari	Music
1986	–	V. V. Swarna Venkatesa Deekshithar	Music
1986		Komal Kothari	Music
1986	–	S. Ramanathan	Music
1986		Satyajit Ray	Music
1988		Shivaputra Siddaramayya Komkali ‘Kumar Gandharva’	Music
1989		Lata Mangeshkar	Music
1990		Utpal Dutt	Theatre
1990		Ram Gopal	Dance
1991		Alain Daniélou	Music
1991		Kelucharan Mohapatra	Dance
1991	–	T. S. Parthasarathy	Overall Contribution/Scholarship
1992		Ali Akbar Khan	Music
1992		D. K. Pattammal	Music
1992	–	Prem Lata Sharma	Music
1993		Girish Karnad	Theatre
1993		Mrinalini Sarabhai	Dance
1994		Bismillah Khan	Music
1994		Yehudi Menuhin	Music
1994		Maheswar Neog	Overall Contribution/Scholarship
1995		Vilayat Khan	Music
1996		Ammannur Madhava Chakyar	Dance
1996		Gangubai Hangal	Music
1996		Habib Tanvir	Theatre
1997		Badal Sarkar	Theatre
1998		Bhimsen Joshi	Music
1998		Birju Maharaj	Dance
1998	–	K. P. Kittappa Pillai	Dance
1998		Vijay Tendulkar	Theatre
2001		M. Balamuralikrishna	Music
2001		B. V. Karanth	Theatre
2001		Vempati Chinna Satyam	Dance
2002	–	Shanno Khurana#	Music
2002		Kavalam Narayana Panicker	Theatre
2004	–	Chandralekha	Dance
2004		Annapurna Devi	Music
2004	–	Bindhyabasini Devi	Other performing arts (Note: Other performing arts include Traditional/Folk/Tribal/Dance/Music/Theatre and Puppetry)
2004		Ramankutty Nair	Dance
2004		Zohra Sehgal	Theatre
2004		Tapas Sen	Theatre
2006	–	Rohini Bhate	Dance
2006		T. N. Krishnan	Music
2006		Kishan Maharaj	Music
2006		Gursharan Singh	Theatre
2006	–	N. Khelchandra Singh	Dance
2007	–	Sushil Kumar Saxena	Overall Contribution/Scholarship
2008	–	Khaled Choudhury	Theatre
2008		Sitara Devi	Dance
2008		Bhupen Hazarika	Music
2008	–	R. C. Mehta	Music
2009		Kishori Amonkar	Music
2009		Jasraj	Music
2009		Lalgudi Jayaraman	Music
2009		Yamini Krishnamurthy#	Dance
2009		Shriram Lagoo	Theatre
2009	–	Kamlesh Dutt Tripathi	Theatre
2010		Girija Devi	Music
2010		T. K. Murthy#	Music
2010	–	Nataraja Ramakrishna	Dance
2010	–	Rahim Fahimuddin Dagar	Music
2011		M. Chandrasekaran#	Music
2011		Hariprasad Chaurasia#	Music
2011		Kalamandalam Gopi#	Dance
2011		Chandrashekhara Kambara#	Theatre
2011		Heisnam Kanhailal	Theatre
2011		Mukund Lath	Overall Contribution/Scholarship
2011		Shivkumar Sharma	Music
2011		Rajkumar Singhajit Singh#	Dance
2011		Umayalpuram K. Sivaraman#	Music
2011		Padma Subrahmanyam#	Dance
2011		Amjad Ali Khan#	Music
2012	–	N. Rajam#	Music
2012		Ratan Thiyam#	Theatre
2012		T. H. Vinayakram#	Music
2013		Mahesh Elkunchwar#	Theatre
2013		Kanak Rele	Dance
2013		R Sathyanarayana	Dance
2014		Tulsidas Borkar	Music
2014	–	S. R. Janakiraman#	Music
2014	–	Vijay Kichlu	Music
2014		M. S. Sathyu#	Theatre
2015	–	C. V. Chandrasekhar#	Dance
2016	–	Arvind Parikh#	Music
2016		R. Vedavalli#	Music
2016	–	Ram Gopal Bajaj#	Theatre
2016		Sunil Kothari	Overall Contribution/Scholarship
2018		Zakir Hussain#	Music
2018		Jatin Goswami#	Dance
2018		Sonal Mansingh#	Dance
2018	–	T. K. Kalyanasundaram#	Dance
2019-21		Saroja Vaidyanathan	Dance
2019-21		Sadanam Krishnankutty#	Dance
2019-21	–	Darshana Jhaveri#	Dance
2019-21		Chhannulal Mishra#	Music
2019-21		A. K. C. Natarajan#	Music
2019-21		Swapan Chaudhuri#	Music
2019-21		Malini Rajurkar	Music
2019-21		T. V. Gopalakrishnan#	Music
2019-21		Teejan Bai#	Music
2019-21		Bharat Gupt#	Overall Contribution/Scholarship
2022-23	–	Vinayak Khedekar	Overall Contribution/Scholarship
2022-23		R. Visweswaran	Music
2022-23		Sunayana Hazarilal#	Dance
2022-23		Raja and Radha Reddy#	Dance
2022-23		Dulal Roy	Theater
2022-23	–	Daya Prakash Sinha#	Theater
2024-25	–	Pasumarthi Rattaiah Sarma	Indian dance
2024-25		Puru Dadheech	Indian dance
2024-25	–	Ramlal Bareth	Indian dance
2024-25	–	Rita Ganguly	Indian Music
2024-25	–	Sudharani Raghupathy	Indian Dance
2024-25		A. V. Anand	Indian music
2024-25	–	Chittaranjan Jyotishi	Indian music

== See also ==
- List of Sahitya Akademi fellows
- List of Lalit Kala Akademi fellows
