= Visweswaran =

Visweswaran is a Tamil surname and given name. Notable people with the surname include:

- Chitra Visweswaran (born 1950), Indian dancer
- R. Visweswaran (1944–2007), Indian musician
