= Unnal Mudiyum Thambi =

- Theatrical release poster
- Directed by: K. Balachander
- Written by: K. Balachander
- Based on: Rudraveena by K. Balachander
- Produced by: Rajam Balachander; Pushpa Kandaswamy
- Starring: Kamal Haasan; Seetha; Gemini Ganesan
- Cinematography: R. Raghunatha Reddy
- Edited by: R. Bhaskaran
- Music by: Ilaiyaraaja
- Production company: Kavithalayaa Productions
- Release date: 12 August 1988
- Country: India
- Language: Tamil

Unnal Mudiyum Thambi (transl. You can do it, brother!) is a 1988 Indian Tamil-language musical drama film written and directed by K. Balachander. Produced by Kavithalayaa Productions, the film stars Kamal Haasan, Seetha and Gemini Ganesan. Manorama, Janagaraj, Prasad Babu, Nassar, and Delhi Ganesh play supporting roles. The film was a remake of Balachander's own Telugu film Rudraveena (1988).

Unnal Mudiyum Thambi focuses on the ideological conflicts between 'Bilahari' Marthandam Pillai, a reputed Carnatic musician, and his younger son Udayamoorthy. Pillai's discrimination towards the people belonging to lower caste is met with criticism from Udhayamoorthy, who believes in society's welfare and walks out for good later. The events that led to change in Pillai's views form the remaining part of the story.

Ilaiyaraaja composed the film's soundtrack and background score. R. Raghunatha Reddy was the film's director of photography, R. Bhaskaran edited the film, and Mohanam was the art director. The film was released on 12 August 1988 to positive critical reception.

== Plot ==
A car makes an entry into the village. An MP gets out of the car and finds that the village is self-disciplined in terms of cleanliness, and the villagers get rid of bad habits, such as drinking. He learns that the cause of all this is a young man named Udaymoorthy. The MP wonders how only a young man was able to achieve this and expresses this to Udayamoorthy; a flashback begins.

Adolescent Udayamoorthy, from a high society family, sees an old, blind beggar woman struggling to pick up a banana thrown by a passerby. Udayamoorthy doesn't help the woman, and an old man helps the beggar woman instead. The old man calls Udayamurthy and advises him to be helpful to others. The struggle of that elderly woman pinches his mindset due him not helping her in need. Now an adult, Udayamoorthy is a very mischievous and happy-go-lucky guy who likes to pull pranks on his family members and gets punished by his father Bilahari Marthandam Pillai, an ardent devotee and short-tempered Carnatic music singer. Pillai's elder son is born mute and hence had to take in instrument, the nadhaswaram, which he is quite adept at.

One day, Pillai shouts at Udayamoorthy, saying that it is better to die than to live an irresponsible life like this, and this hurts Udayamoorthy. The next morning, family members are shocked on seeing Udayamurthy hanging himself at the middle of the hall. But actually, it is another prank played by him, and he did not die so. Angayarkanni, hurt by the mischief, feels sad for not playing her role as a sister-in-law and not raising Udayamoorthy properly and making him as an irresponsible boy. Udayamoorthy changes his mind and start to be responsible, making his family happy. He comes to a decision of being helpful to the society by reminding of the temple incident in his adolescent life and on seeing an old gardener who wants to live usefully for the society at least by planting trees.

Udayamoorthy sees a woman in a government office who protests against an official for rejecting her application for a teacher job for not mentioning her caste and religion in the application. Udayamoorthy again sees the woman at a theatre when she slaps a thug for misbehaving. Udayamoorthy gets attracted to the girl named Lalithakamalam, on knowing that she and her thoughts are very much secular. Both Udayamoorthy and Lalitha fall in love with each other. Udayamoorthy could not concentrate on singing when he hears the begging of a night beggar. This angers Pillai, and he shouts that Udayamoorthy is not fit to be his disciple. Pillai also gets angry on seeing Udayamoorthy loving a girl who come from the caste of untouchables. Udayamoorthy and Pillai get into a fight when the latter brings another man Charukesi to become his disciple, stating reasons that Udayamoorthy can live as a man going behind humanity and not as a devoted singer. At another incident, Udayamoorthy gets vexed when Pillai does not care to save a dying man by giving a lift in his car to the hospital but cared only to be punctual for his music program, leading to the man's death due to delay in treatment. Pillai challenges Udayamoorthy to become a man making his father proud without using the name of his father in the society and then he will listen to what he says. Udayamoorthy could not bear to be neglected by his father, and he leaves the house.

Udayamoorthy meets the dead man's wife and finds that the government did not give any compensation to the family as the man was drunk while on duty. Udayamoorthy finds a lot of men laying always at drunkard state and their children going for work to earn for their drinking expense instead of going to school. Hence he sets out to change the people and bring them out of drinking habit. He becomes unsuccessful in his attempt, and at the same time gets attacked by a liquor-selling group. Lalitha provokes the wives of the drunkards to protest their husbands, to which the women co-operate. Udayamoorthy gains the enmity of the drunkards for destroying the liquor shops and provoking their wives against them. Hence they set out to stop the wedding of Udayamoorthy with Lalitha by promising that they would stop drinking if he cancels his wedding, to which Udayamoorthy accepts. His sacrifice earns up the respect upon the whole village, and the drunkards start to obey him. Udayamoorthy and Lalitha together start 'Amaidhi Puratchi Iyyakam' (Silent Revolution Movement) and bring many reforms.

The MP, on hearing the whole story, appreciates him a lot and brings the reformation to the light of the government. Udayamurthy becomes famous overnight and gets 'Best Indian' award from the prime minister for transforming the village in the good path. Pillai finds that his son achieved his mission and proudly announces that Pillai is Udayamoorthy's father, rather Udayamurthy is Pillai's son. He also accepts the marriage of his son with Lalitha and unites them.

== Cast ==
- Kamal Haasan as Udayamoorthy
- Seetha as Lalithakamalam
- Manorama as Angayarkanni
- Janagaraj
- Prasad Babu as Udayamoorthy's mute brother
- Gemini Ganesan as Bilhari Marthandam Pillai
- Nassar as the wine shop owner
- Charle
- Krishnan
- Dhaarini as Mohana, Udayamoorthy's sister
- K. S. Jayalakshmi
- V. K. Ramasamy as "Bloody" MP (special appearance)
- Delhi Ganesh as Matchbox Company Owner
- Visweswaran as Prime Minister
- Meesai Murugesh as Anjayya
- Typist Gopu
- Ramesh Aravind as Charukesi (uncredited)
- Vasanth as a reporter (uncredited)

== Production ==
Unnal Mudiyum Thambi is a remake of the Telugu film Rudraveena. Kamal Haasan's character was inspired by, and named after a real life social activist M. S. Udayamurthy. Gemini Ganesan was cast as the Carnatic musician Bilahari Marthandam Pillai, reprising his role from the Telugu original. R. Visweswaran, husband of Bharatanatyam artist Chitra Visweswaran portrayed the role of the Prime Minister who appears in the climax. During the pre-production phases, the film was tentatively titled Sundarakandam.

== Soundtrack ==
The songs were composed by Ilaiyaraaja. He reused some tracks from the Telugu original. The song "Idhazhil Kathai" is set in Lalitha raga, "Nee Ondruthaan" is set in Bilahari, "Enna Samayalo" is set in Ragamalika, "Akkam Pakkam" is set in Punnagavarali and "Punjai Undu" is set in Suddha Dhanyasi.. "Maanida Sevai", continues from Patnam Subramania Iyer's composition, Pancha Nadeesha Pahimam, set in Poornachandrika. The title track, "Unnal Mudiyum Thambi" is set in Hindolam.

Track listing
No.	Title	Lyrics	Singer(s)	Length
1.	"Unnal Mudiyum Thambi"	Pulamaipithan	S. P. Balasubrahmanyam
2.	"Ithazhil Kathai Ezhuthum Neram"	Muthulingam	S. P. Balasubramanyam, K. S. Chitra
3.	"Enna Samayalo"	Ilaiyaraaja	S. P. Balasubrahmanyam, K. S. Chitra, Sunandha
4.	"Akkam Pakkam Parada"	Pulamaipithan	S. P. Balasubramanyam
5.	"Punjai Undu"	Pulamaipithan	S. P. Balasubrahmanyam
6.	"Nee Onru Than"	Pulamaipithan	K. J. Yesudas
7.	"Maanida Sevai"	Pulamaipithan	K. J. Yesudas

== Release and reception ==
Unnal Mudiyum Thambi was released on 12 August 1988. The Indian Express wrote, "[Unnal Mudiyum Thambi] has not only something to say, the manner in which it says this is, within the parameters of Tamil cinema's idiom, quite lively." S. P. Balasubrahmanyam won Best male playback singer award at the 10th Cinema Express Awards. At the 2nd Gammaa Malaysian Indian Music Awards, the film won three awards: Best Foreign Indian Male Singer (Balasubrahmanyam), Best Foreign Indian Female Singer (Chithra) and Best Foreign Indian Film.

== Bibliography ==
- Sundararaman (2007) [2005]. Raga Chintamani: A Guide to Carnatic Ragas Through Tamil Film Music (2nd ed.). Pichhamal Chintamani.
