= Mint Street, Chennai =

Historical street in Chennai, India

Mint Street
- Interactive map of Mint Street
- Maintained by: Corporation of Chennai
- Length: 1.6 mi (2.6 km)
- Coordinates: 13°5′2″N 80°16′41″E
- North end: North Wall Road–Old Jail Road Junction, Washermanpet, Chennai
- South end: Poonamallee High Road, Park Town, Chennai

Mint Street is one of the prime streets of the commercial centre of George Town in Chennai, India. The street is one of the oldest streets in Chennai and is believed to be the longest street in the city. Running north–south, the street connects Poonamallee High Road at Park Town in the south with North Wall Road–Old Jail Road Junction at Washermanpet in the north. Running parallel to the Wall Tax Road, another historical thoroughfare in the city, the street passes through thickly populated residential and commercial areas of the historical neighbourhood.

== Etymology ==
The street was named so during the 1840s when the British East India Company established its coin-making facility here.

== History ==
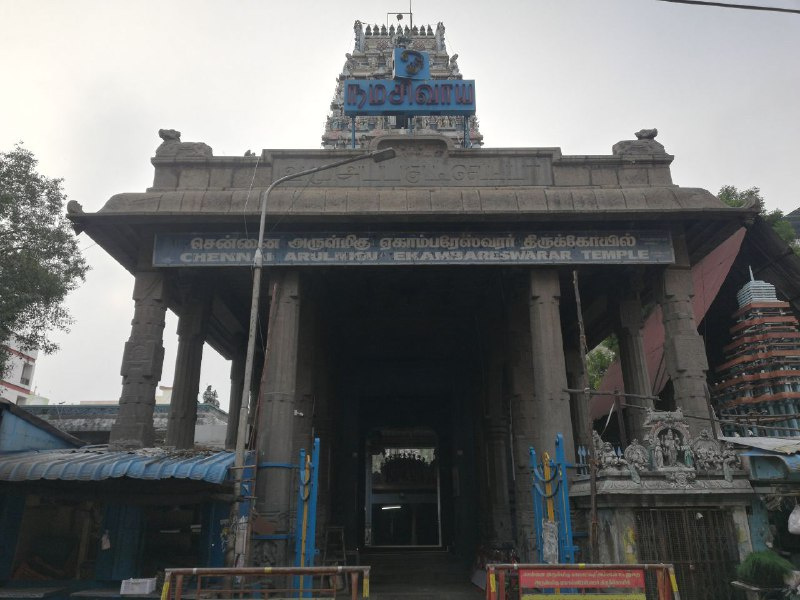
Ekambareshwarar Temple at Mint Street

In the 16th century, Madras Synagogue and Jewish Cemetery was established on the street by a Portuguese Jewish trader, Jacques de Paiva. It was later moved to Lloyd's Road and became the Lloyd's Road Jewish Cemetery.

In the early 18th century, washers and bleachers employed by the British East India Company for its cloth business settled around the street, given it the name 'Washers' Street'. Several of them were Telugu speaking, followed by the middlemen or dubashes (men who knew two languages), chiefly Telugu-speaking Komutti and Beri Chetties. By the 1740s, Gujaratis and Saurashtrians from the Saurashtra region closely associated with the cloth trade settled down in the area to the west of the street. Soon, the area also became home to Marwaris, who were chiefly pawn brokers and money lenders. Mint Street thus became a confluence of various language speakers, which has remained so to this day.

In 1841–1842, the East India Company moved its coin-making facility to this street, and since then the street has been known as Mint Street. Later, the mint was converted into the Government Press, which still functions. Next to the Press stood Crown Talkies, one of the city's earliest cinema theatres built by a photographer named Ragupathy Venkaiah, who also built other theatres such as Gaiety and Globe in various parts of the city. The street also housed Muragan Theatre, where Kalidasa, the first Tamil talkie, was released.

The city's first ticketed Carnatic concert was conducted in this street in the 1880s for a concert by Maha Vaidyanatha Sivan at the Thondaimandalam Thruva Vellalar School, which is now in a dilapidated condition. The concept, however, did not succeed.

In 1889, the Hindu Theological School was established, where the legendary C. Saraswathi Bai gave her first harikatha performance in 1909, becoming the first woman to do so. The school was visited by Mahatma Gandhi in 1896.

== The present-day street ==
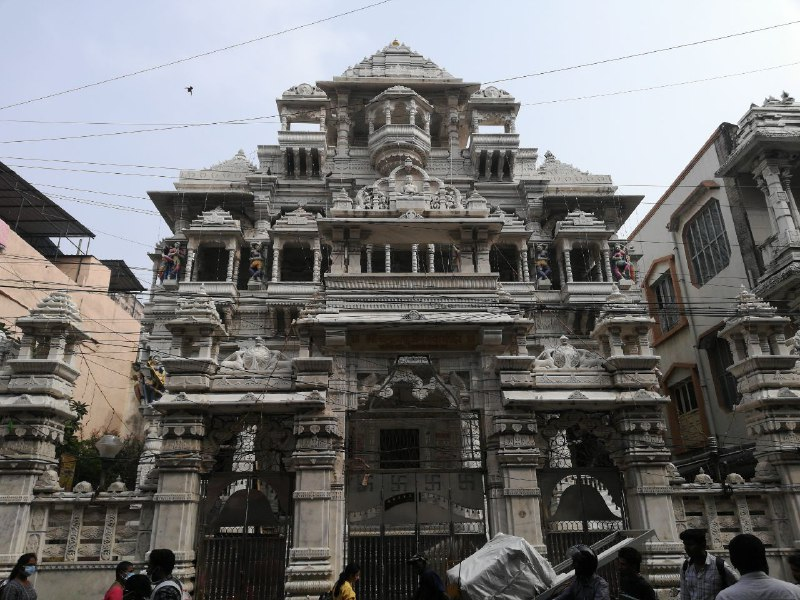
Shri Chandraprabhu Jain temple

The street is known for its authentic Rajasthani cuisine, which Marwaris believe is only available in this area.

The memorial house of savant Ramalinga Swamigal is located near the northern end of the street, in Veerasami Street, a lane off Barracks Street.

The street houses two historic schools, namely the Tondaimandalam Tuluva Vellalar (TTV) School, founded in 1854, and the Hindu Theological School, founded in 1889. The TTV School was home to one of the earliest music sabhas—the Tondaimandalam Sabha. It was at a meeting of this Sabha at the school in 1905 that the decision to celebrate the Aradhana of Tyagaraja in a grand manner at Thiruvaiyaru was taken by a large group of musicians.

Mint Street housed several bhajan centres (bhajanai mandirams), to nurture the bhajan tradition of Carnatic music, of which at least two still survive. One of these centres has transformed into a temple. Known as the 'Sumai tangi' (load-bearing) Rama temple, it has two exquisite Thanjavur paintings of Rama and Narasimha, which were the original objects of worship before the erection of stone idols. In a talk that Tiger Varadachariar gave over the All India Radio, composers and music publishers Tachur Singaracharlu Brothers organised bhajan sessions at this temple in the 1890s. Mint Street has several temples dedicated to Lord Ganesha. Kandaswami Temple, dedicated to Lord Murugan, is located on Rasappa Chetty Street, off Mint Street. The street is also home to the Ekambareswarar Temple.

== See also ==
- Parry's Corner
- George Town
- History of Chennai

== Bibliography ==
- Muthiah, S. (1981). Madras Discovered. East West Books (Madras) Pvt Ltd. p. 124.
