= Saroja Vaidyanathan =

Indian dancer and choreographer (1937–2023)

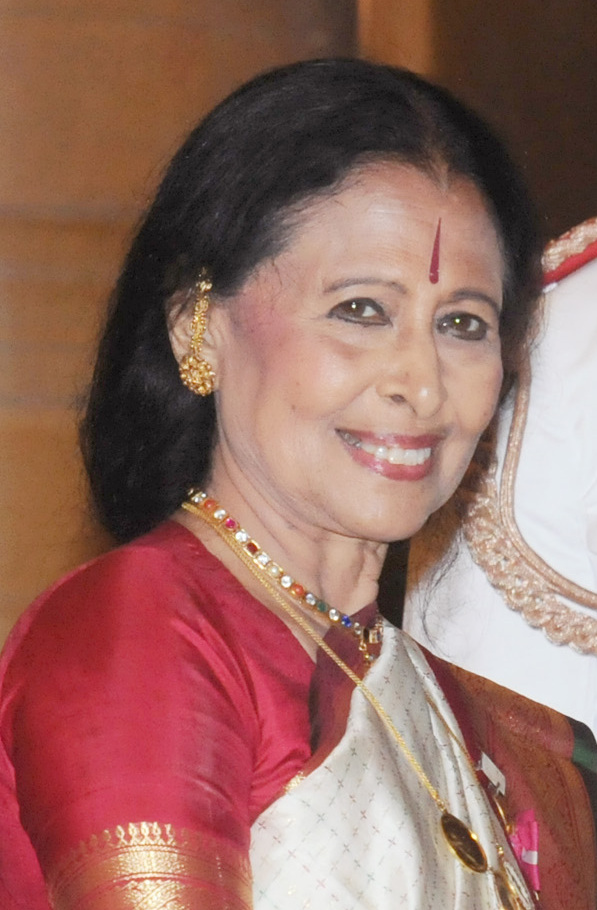
- Vaidyanathan in 2013
- Born: 19 September 1937; Bellary, Ceded Districts, Madras Province, British India
- Died: 21 September 2023 (aged 86); New Delhi, India
- Education: Madras University
- Occupations: Dancer; choreographer; writer
- Years active: 1960s-2023
- Organization: Ganesa Natyalaya (Estb. 1974)
- Children: C. V. Kamesh (son)
- Relatives: Rama Vaidyanathan (daughter-in-law)
- Awards: Padma Shri (2002); Padma Bhushan (2013); Sangeet Natak Akademi Fellowship (2022)
- Dancing career
- Dances: Bharatanatyam
- Website: ganesanatyalaya.co.in

Saroja Vaidyanathan (19 September 1937 – 21 September 2023) was an Indian dancer, choreographer, and guru of Bharatanatyam style of Indian classical dance. In 1974, she established her classical dance school, Ganesa Natyalaya in Delhi, an important institution for Bharatanatyam education outside South India. In a career spanning six decades, she performed in many countries around the world, and choreographed 10 full-length ballets and nearly 2,000 choreographies.

She was conferred the Padma Shri in 2002 and the Padma Bhushan in 2013 by the Government of India. In 2023, she was awarded the Sangeet Natak Akademi Fellowship, the highest award of Sangeet Natak Akademi, India's national academy for performing arts, for her contribution to Indian dance.

== Early life and education ==
Saroja Vaidyanathan (née Dharmarajan) was born in Bellary, Karnataka, on 19 September 1937, and grew up in Chennai. Vaidyanathan's parents were both authors; her mother Kanakam Dharmarajan was a writer of detective fiction in Tamil.

She developed an interest in Bharatanatyam after watching performances by dancer and actress Kamala. Later she received her initial training in Bharatanatyam was under K. Lalitha (Lalitha Sastry) at the Saraswati Gana Nilayam in Chennai, who in turn was disciple of guru Kattumannar Muthukumaran Pillai of Thanjavur. She also studied Carnatic music under Professor P. Sambamoorthy at Madras University and had a D.Litt in dance from the Indira Kala Sangeet Vishwavidyalaya, Khairagarh.

== Career ==
Vaidyanathan gave up dancing publicly in 1960s, after her marriage to an officer of the Indian Administrative Service (IAS) posted in Bihar. Due to conservative and adverse reactions to her performing in public venues and took instead to teaching children dance at home. Following her husband's transfer to Delhi in 1972, she established the Ganesa Natyalaya there in 1974. She was monetarily supported by well wishers and sponsors and the building for the Natyalaya was built at the Qutab Institutional Area in 1988. In the coming decades, the school developed into an important institution for Bharatanatyam education in the capital. Besides the dance itself, students at the Ganesa Natyalaya are also taught Tamil, Hindi, and Carnatic vocal music to give them a holistic understanding of Bharatanatyam.

Vaidyanathan was a prolific choreographer and had to her credit ten full-length ballets and nearly two thousand individual Bharatanatyam pieces. She undertook a cultural tour of South East Asia in 2002, accompanying Prime Minister Atal Bihari Vajpayee's visit to the ASEAN Summit in 2002. She had also published her renditions of Subramania Bharati's songs and poems and set some of her works to dance.

== Books ==
Saroja Vidyanathan wrote a number of books on Bharatanatyam and Carnatic music including The Classical Dances of India, Bharatanatyam – An In-Depth Study, Carnataka Sangeetham, and The Science of Bharatanatyam.

== Personal life ==
Saroja was married to Vaidyanathan, an IAS officer of the Bihar cadre. The couple had a son, C. V. Kamesh and their daughter-in-law Rama Vaidyanathan is a well-known Bharatanatyam artist of international fame. Saroja's grand-daughter, Dakshina Vaidyanathan Baghel, is also a sought-after Indian classical dancer.

Vaidyanathan died at her residence from cancer on 21 September 2023, two days after her 86th birthday.

== Awards and honours ==
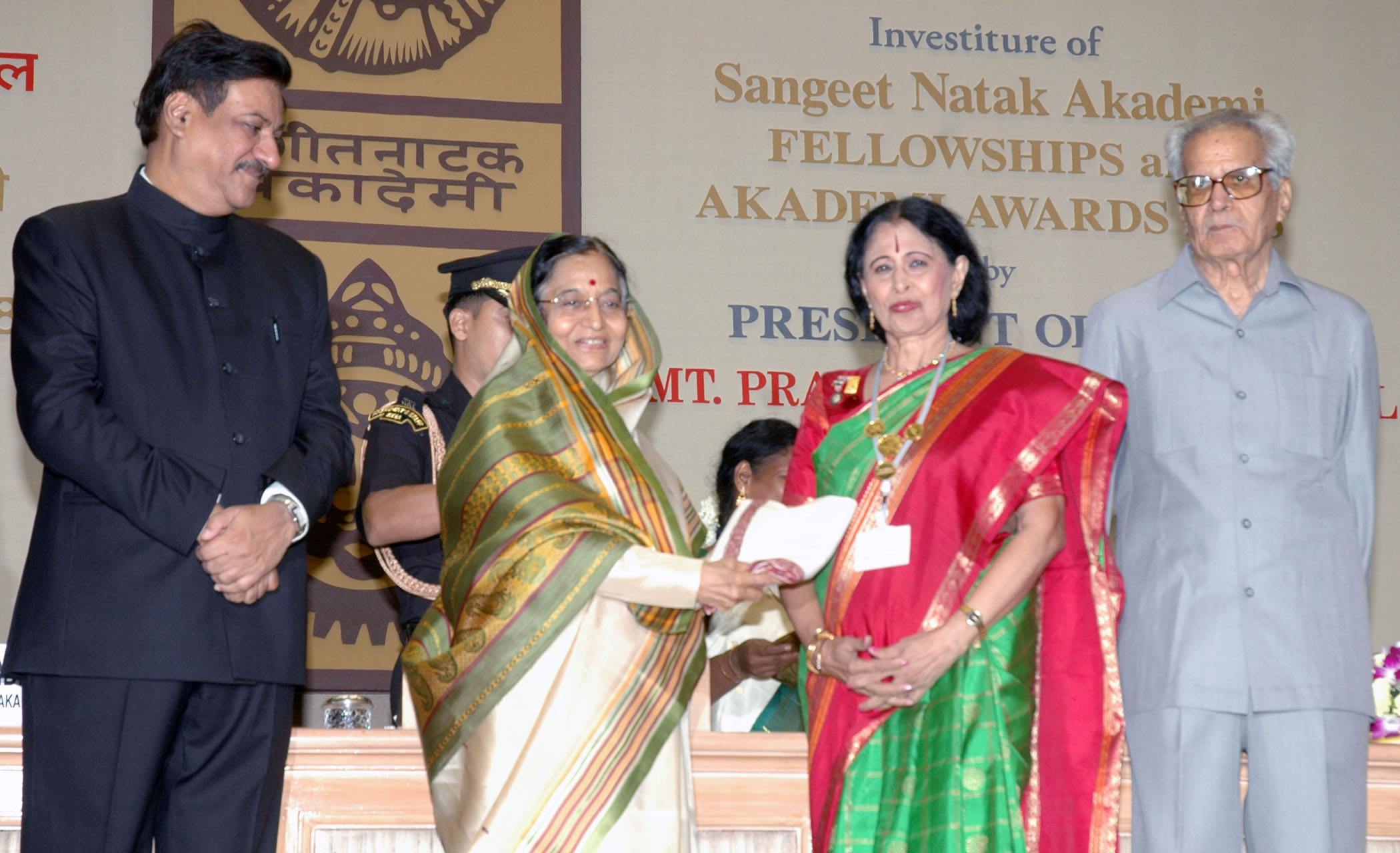
President of India Pratibha Patil presenting the Sangeet Natak Akademi Award of 2008 to Saroja Vaidyanathan for her contribution to Bharatanatyam

- Recipient of the Sahitya Kala Parishad Samman of the Government of Delhi in 1990-91.
- Recipient of the Kalaimamani Award in 1999 bestowed by the Tamil Nadu Eyal Isai Nataka Mandram.<
- Conferred the Padma Shri in 2002
- Conferred the title of 'Bharata Kalai Sudar' in 2006.
- Recipient of the Sangeet Natak Akademi Award in 2008.
- Conferred the Padma Bhushan in 2013.
- Sangeet Natak Akademi Fellowship by Sangeet Natak Akademi in 2022
