= Sri Vetrimalai Murugan Temple =

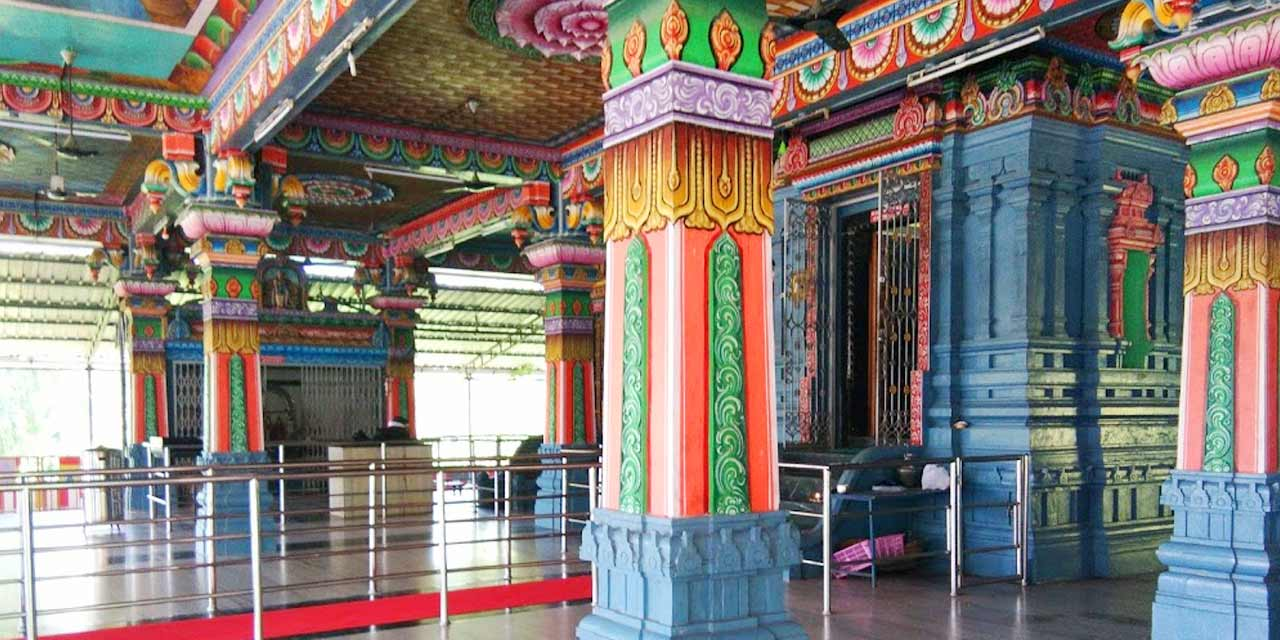
- Inside the Sri Vetrimalai Murugan temple

- Location in the Andaman and Nicobar Islands, India

Religion
- Affiliation: Hinduism
- District: South Andaman district
- Deity: Murugan

Location
- Location: Port Blair
- State: Andaman and Nicobar Islands
- Country: India
- Interactive map of Sri Vetrimalai Murugan Temple
- Coordinates: 11.6631°N 92.7464°E

Architecture
- Type: Dravidian architecture
- Completed: 1926

Sri Vetrimalai Murugan Temple is a Hindu temple located in Port Blair, which is the capital of the Andaman and Nicobar Islands, India. This temple, dedicated to the Hindu deity Murugan, is an important Hindu pilgrimage site for the islands. It is a center of festivities during important Hindu festivals through the year.

== Background ==
Vetrimalai Murugan Temple initially had a temple of Lord Vinayaka to make sure so that the administrative staff who are primarily tamilians remain faithful to the Britishers, but later in the Year 1926 the surroundings for the temple got constructed when one of the staffs in the temple requested for the temple of Lord Murugan. The temple, set up in Ross Island had construction completed by year 1932 and was shifted to Port Blair post Independence of India, with the management in the hands of famous Tamil businessman. The structure of the temple was based on the idea of Kandakottam temple of Chennai.

== Visit timings ==
The temple is open from 5am to 12pm and 4pm to 9pm.

== See also ==
- Murugan
- Port Blair
