= Ekambareswarar Temple, Chennai =

Coordinates: 13.08817°N 80.2784°E

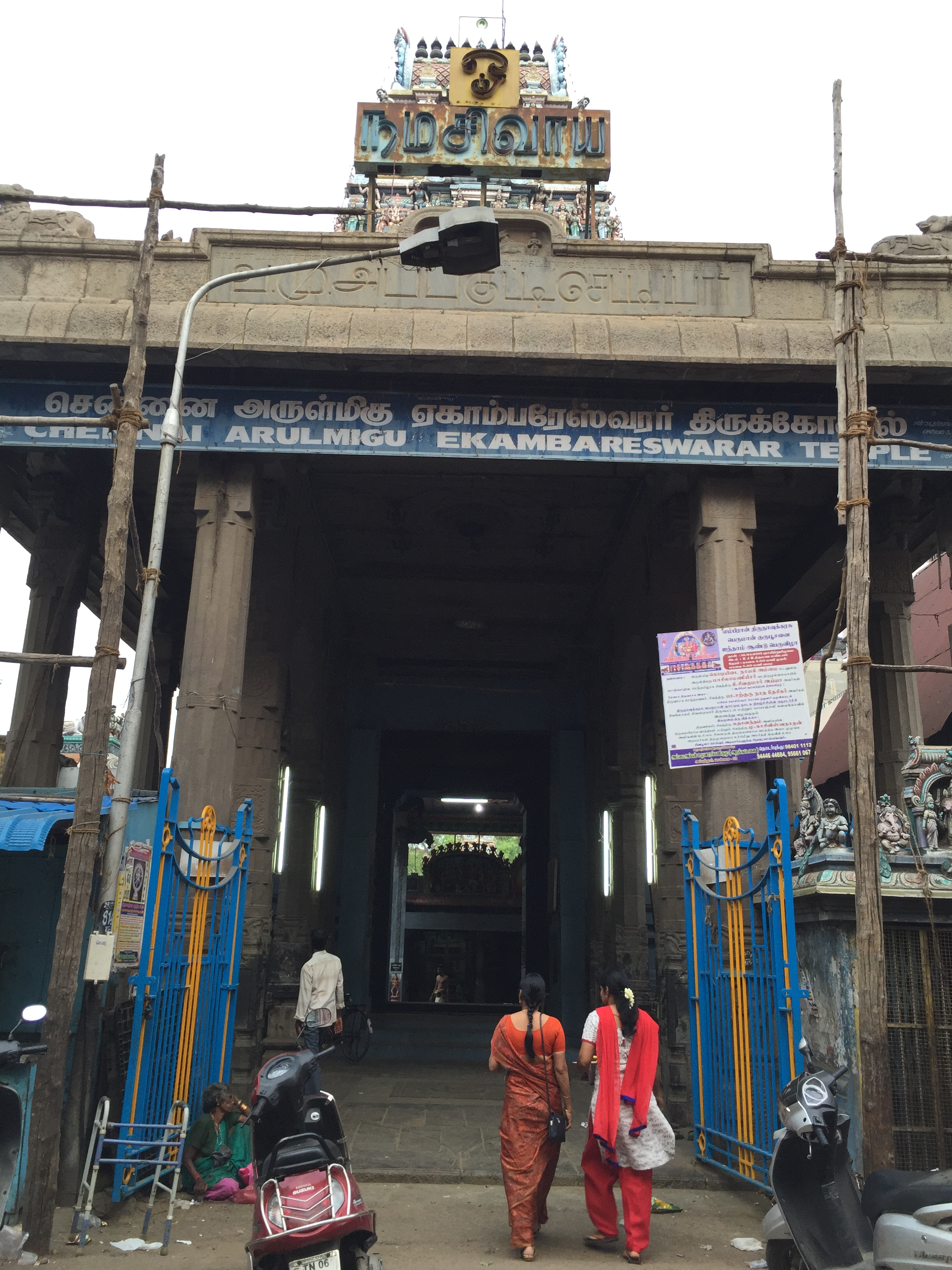
- Chennai Ekambareswarar Kovil

- Location within Tamil Nadu

Religion
- Affiliation: Hinduism
- Deity: Shiva

Location
- Location: Chennai
- State: Tamil Nadu
- Country: India
- Interactive map of Ekambareswarar Temple, Chennai

Architecture
- Completed: 1680s

Ekambareswarar Temple, Chennai is a Hindu temple situated in the neighbourhood of Parry's corner (George Town), Chennai, India dedicated to Shiva. It was constructed by Alanganatha Pillai, chief merchant of the Madras factory of the British East India Company.

== Location ==
The Ekambareswarar Temple is located in Mint Street and is flanked by two Jain shrines and Kandaswami Temple.

== History ==
The Ekambareswarar Temple was constructed by Alanganatha Pillai, a dubash in the service of the British East India Company in the 1680s. The temple is marked in a 1710 map of Madras city as "Allingall's Pagoda".
