= Sushil Kumar Saxena =

Indian musicologist and scholar

- Born: India
- Occupations: Musicologist; Writer; Scholar; Academic
- Known for: Writings on Indian music and aesthetics
- Awards: Padma Bhushan; Sangeet Natak Akademi Fellowship

Sushil Kumar Saxena is an Indian musicologist, academic, scholar and the author of several books on music, philosophy and aesthetics. He is a former member of the faculty of the University of Delhi and has served the University Court as a member. His works include Studies in the Metaphysics of Bradley, Hindustan Music and Aesthetics Today, Art and Philosophy: Seven Aestheticians, Croce, Dewey, Collingwood, Santayana, Ducasse Langer, Reid, and Swinging Syllables Aesthetics of Kathak Dance and his lectures have been included in a book, Indian Music: Eminent Thinkers on Core Issues; Discourses by Premlata Sharma, S. K. Saxena and Kapila Vatsyayan. He is a recipient of the Sangeet Natak Akademi Fellowship which he received in 2007. The Government of India awarded him the third highest civilian honour of the Padma Bhushan, in 2008, for his contributions to Indian music.

== Selected bibliography ==
- Sushil Kumar Saxena (1988). Ever Unto God: Essays on Gandhi and Religion. Indian Council of Philosophical Research. ISBN 978-81-85292-02-1.
- Sushil Kumar Saxena (1994). Art and Philosophy: Seven Aestheticians, Croce, Dewey, Collingwood, Santayana, Ducasse Langer, Reid. Indian Council of Philosophical Research. ISBN 978-81-85636-07-8.
- Sushil Kumar Saxena (2001). Hindustani Sangeet and a Philosopher of Art: Music, Rhythm, and Kathak Dance Vis-à-vis Aesthetics of Susanne K. Langer. D.K. Printworld. ISBN 978-81-246-0180-8.
- Sushil Kumar Saxena (2006). Swinging Syllables Aesthetics of Kathak Dance. Pinnacle Technology. ISBN 978-1-61820-230-7.
- Sushil Kumar Saxena (2009). Hindustani Music and Aesthetics Today: A Selective Study. Sangeet Natak Akademi. ISBN 978-81-7871-129-4.
- Sushil Kumar Saxena (2009). Hindustani Music and Aesthetics Today: A Selective Study. Sangeet Natak Akademi. ISBN 978-81-7871-129-4.
- Sushil Kumar Saxena (2010). Aesthetics: Approaches, Concepts, and Problems. Sangeet Natak Akademi. ISBN 978-81-246-0555-4.
- Sushil Kumar Saxena (2014). Studies in the Metaphysics of Bradley. Routledge. ISBN 978-1-317-85202-5.

== See also ==
- Sangeet Natak Akademi Fellowship
- Kapila Vatsyayan
