= Chitra Visweswaran =

Indian dancer

Padma Shri Chitra Visweswaran
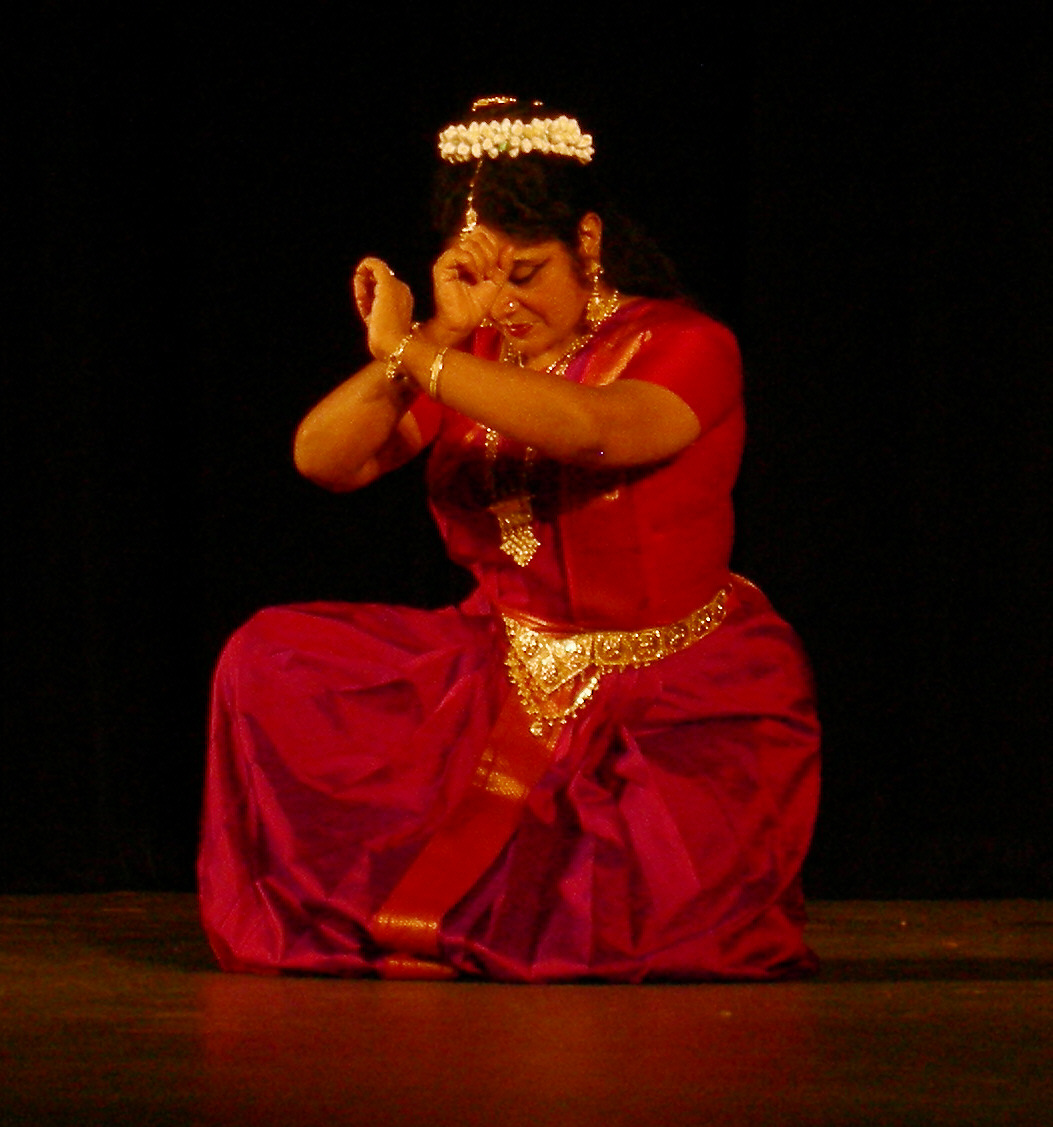
- Chitra Visweswaran performing in Seattle
- Education: B.A English(Hons) at University of Calcutta
- Occupation: Dancer
- Spouse: R. Viswesaran
- Parent(s): N. Padmanabhan (Father) & Rukmini Padmanabhan (Mother)
- Awards: Padma Shri (1992), Kalaimamani Award (1982).

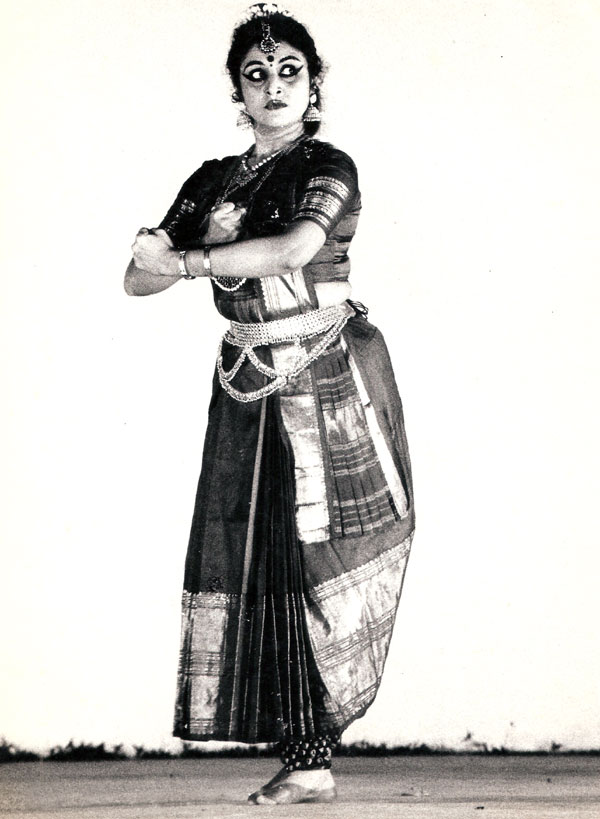
Visweswaran performing in Kerala

Chitra Visweswaran is a renowned Indian classical Bharata Natyam dancer, choreographer, and guru who has significantly contributed to the preservation and innovation of the art form. A recipient of the prestigious Padma Shri and Sangeet Natak Akademi awards, she is also the founder of the Chidambaram Academy of Performing Arts in Chennai.

== Early life and training ==
Visweswaran began dancing at the age of three with her mother, Rukmini Padmanabhan, who was trained in contemporary Indian dance and Bharata Natyam. Her father was an engineer with Indian Railways, and when his job took the family to London, Chitra began to study classical ballet. Later, in Kolkata, she trained in the Manipuri and Kathak dance forms. At the age of ten, she went under the tutelage of T. A. Rajalakshmi, one of the best devadasis from Thiruvidaimarudur, who had settled in Kolkata. Her arangetram—her debut onstage performance—took place within ten months, an unusually short period, and she continued to train with Rajalakshmi for almost a decade.

At thirteen, Visweswaran choreographed the life of Tyagaraja in the form of a varnam, the most demanding type of piece in the Bharata Natyam repertoire. She wanted to move to Chennai (then called Madras) after finishing school to pursue a career in dance, but her parents insisted that she complete a college degree. She earned a BA in English from the University of Calcutta while simultaneously studying dance theory and the history of dance on her own time.

In 1970, she received a scholarship for advanced study in Bharata Natyam from the Indian Ministry of Human Resource Development at a time when only two such scholarships per year were awarded nationwide, compared with 25 today. She spent her four-year scholarship period studying in Chennai under Vazhuvoor Ramaiyya Pillai. Within three months, he chose Visweswaran over his other students to star in a dance drama he had choreographed. The musicologist P. Sambamurthy, the art historian Kapila Vatsyayan, and the dance critic Sunil Kothari all noted her work. Visweswaran is also well-versed in Rabindranritya, Rabindrasangeet, and Theater.

== Teaching work ==
Visweswaran started teaching dance in Kolkata at the age of sixteen, and in 1975, she established the Chidambaram Academy of Performing Arts (CAPA) in Chennai. Today, CAPA has satellite institutions around the world led by former students. Admission is highly selective, and graduates have received national and international scholarships and fellowships.

Visweswaran also raises money for RASA, an organisation that uses dance and music therapy for children with learning disabilities.

== Dance productions ==
In 1980, Visweswaran choreographed her first major dance drama, Devi Ashta Rasa Malika, which helped popularise the concept of group formations in Bharata Natyam. Several thematic solo productions followed, including:

- Krishnanjali, which introduced the flashback technique to Bharata Natyam
- Purandara Krishnamritham, in which rare kritis of the Kannada composer Purandara Dasa were researched and strung together thematically
- Saptha Sapthi, which explored seven aspects of the number seven
- Sthree Sakthi, a saga of Indian women from Sita to Jhansi Ki Rani

One of her group productions explored the parallels between two women's approaches to poetry and bhakti: the South Indian saint Andal and the Mewari princess Meera. In another work, a production of the Ramayana, Visweswaran used a single Sanskrit kriti, translated into Tamil, to anchor the dance musically. She also produced Devaki Pulambal from the viewpoint of Devaki, the mother of Krishna, instead of the viewpoint of the story's traditional narrator, Yasodharā.

Visweswaran eventually dropped costumes from her productions, arguing that playing a character solely through mime, gesture, and stance was more challenging than playing a character in the expected costume.

In 1989, India's National Academy of Sciences commissioned her to create a production about the Ganges river, not highlighting its religious connotations, but presenting it as representative of the ethos of India.

== Performances ==
Visweswaran has performed in all of India's major dance festivals and has made several tours abroad, dancing in Australia, Austria, Bahrain, Belgium, Bulgaria, Canada, Fiji, France, Germany, Italy, Kuwait, Luxembourg, Malaysia, the Netherlands, Oman, Portugal, Qatar, Singapore, Sri Lanka, Sweden, Switzerland, the United Arab Emirates, the United Kingdom, and the United States.

She is regularly featured on the National Program of Dance and on local programs of Doordarshan and other Indian channels. Her dances have also been broadcast by The Mike Walsh Show in Australia, the Singapore Broadcasting Corporation, BBC Television, and networks in France, Malaysia, Portugal, Switzerland, and the United States. On the 50th anniversary of India's independence, the BBC invited her to present a specially choreographed program at Symphony Hall in Birmingham that was telecast internationally on 15 August 1997.

== Awards ==
- 1980: Sri Krishna Gana Sabha, an Indian cultural institution, gave Visweswaran its Nritya Choodamani award.
- 1982: Received title of Kalaimamani Award by the Government of Tamil Nadu, which is the highest state honour in the field of Arts.
- 1987: Received the Sangeet Natak Akademi Award.
- 1988: Nritya Vilas award, Sur Singar Samsad, Mumbai.
- 1992: Manav Sewa Puraskar, Institute of Economic Studies, New Delhi.
- 1992: Received the Padma Shri from the President of India.
- 1999: Natanamani, Kanchi Paramacharya.
- 2000: Awarded the titles of Mahila Shiromani (distinguished woman of Indian origin) and Sthree Ratna (gem amongst women). The Japan Foundation invited her to be its special guest.
- 2013: Recipient of the Music Academy's Natya Kala Acharya Award for Dance. She has also presented her work at United Nations, UNESCO.

== Membership ==
In 1996 and 1997, she convened the Sabha's Natya Kala conference, the only dance seminar of its kind in India. She is a trustee of the India Foundation for the Arts and a member of the Indian government committee that selects candidates for scholarships and fellowships in Bharata Natyam. She is the University of Madras's Rabindranath Tagore Chair in Fine Arts, and is also a member of the general council and executive board of the Sangeet Natak Akademi, the top performing arts body in India.

== Personal life ==
Visweswaran's husband, Sri R. Visweswaran, a nephew of the Carnatic musician G.N. Balasubramaniam, was a vocalist, instrumentalist, and composer with extensive experience in film music. He played the santoor, veena, and flamenco guitar, and had composed and directed music for his wife's productions.
