= Bindhyabasini Devi =

Indian folk musician

Bindhyavasini Devi
- Born: 5 January 1920; Muzaffarpur, Bihar, India
- Died: 18 April 2006 (aged 86); Kankarbagh, Patna, Bihar, India
- Occupation: Folk musician
- Known for: Indian folk music
- Spouse: Shedeveshvar Chandra Verma
- Children: Two sons (Santosh Kumar Sinha and Sudhir Kumar Sinha) and one daughter (Pushparani Madhu)
- Awards: Padma Shri; Sangeet Natak Akademi Award; Sangeet Natak Akademi Fellowship; Ahilya Bai Award

Bindhyavasini Devi (5 January 1920 - 18 April 2006) was an Indian folk musician and singer. She was popularly recognised as Bihar Kokila. She was the founder of Vindhya Kala Mandir, a Patna based music academy promoting folk music, Vindhya Kala Mandir. The academy is associated with Bhatkhande University, Lucknow for 55 years now which is now run by her daughter-in-law Shobha Sinha, son Sudhir Kumar Sinha. She was born in Muzaffarpur in the Indian state of Bihar and specialised in Maithili, Bhojpuri and Magahi folk music. She also sang a popular song, Chhote Dulha Ke, in a movie, Vivah Geet and many of her songs have been released in CD format.

The Government of India awarded her the fourth-highest Indian civilian award of Padma Shri in 1974. The Sangeet Natak Akademi awarded her their annual award in 1991 and followed it up with Akademi Fellowship in 2006. She received the Ahilya Bai Award from the Government of Madhya Pradesh in 1998. Bindhyavasini Devi died at her Kankarbagh residence on 18 April 2006 at the age of 86.

She was married to Shedeveshvar Chandra Verma, and had two sons and a daughter.

== See also ==
- Indian folk music
- Music of Bihar
