= C. Saraswathi Bai =

Indian Harikatha performer (1894–1974)

- Born: 15 December 1894
- Died: 13 January 1974 (aged 79)
- Occupations: Harikatha performer and musician
- Known for: Pioneering woman exponent of Harikatha
- Parent: Gupti Rama Rao (father)
- Awards: Sangeet Natak Akademi Fellowship (1964)

C. Saraswathi Bai (15 December, 1894 – 13 January 1974) was an Indian musician and exponent of Harikatha, a South Indian performing-art tradition. She was the first woman to establish a professional career in Harikatha, traditionally dominated by men.

Known as the First Lady Bhagavatar, she was awarded the Sangeet Natak Akademi Fellowship, the highest award of Sangeet Natak Akademi in 1964. In 1950, Saraswathi Bai became the first woman artist to receive the Certificate of Merit awarded by the Madras Music Academy. She also received the title Gayanapatu from Vishnu Digambar Paluskar in 1916 and Kirtanapatu from Bal Gangadhar Tilak in 1920.

== Early life and training ==
She was born in an orthodox Madhwa Brahmin family, where her father was Gupti Rama Rao, and her mother tongue was Kannada. Spotting her potential, Tiruvaiyaru Krishnachar, a musician and Harikatha singer who taught Sanskrit at Madras Christian College, convinced her family to move to Madras (now Chennai), where he gave her Harikatha training. Thus, she began her musical education at the age of seven. She subsequently studied Sanskrit, Carnatic music and received training in Hindustani classical music under Ustad Yakub Ali Khan.

== Career ==
One of her early public performances of Harikatha was held in November 1908, at the Ladies Recreation Club in Egmore, Chennai (then Madras), where among those present was C. Sankaran Nair, judge of the Madras High Court, who encouraged her to pursue Harikatha professionally. On 22 February 1909, the Sri Parthasarathy Swami Sabha organised her public performance at Hindu Theological School on Mint Street, Chennai, making her the first woman to do so. Her entry into the profession was opposed by some established male performers of the time; the Harikatha Marga Prasanga Sabha even passed a resolution opposing Harikatha performances by women, while her family, accompanists and teachers faced social pressure.

However, rapidly gaining public acceptance, she soon became an established performer as she received patronage from several princely states and aristocratic families in South India, including Chettinad. In 1927 was one of the few women musicians who participated in the All India Music Conference held at the Indian National Congress session at Chennai. By the 1930s, her performances were commercially recorded through Saraswathi Stores, a Chennai-based gramophone-recording company associated with the Odeon Records label. Among her students was Mannargudi Sambasiva Bhagavatar, who later received recognition from the Music Academy, Madras.

Saraswathi Bai died on 13 January 1974.

== See also ==
- Harikatha
- Carnatic music
- Madras Music Academy
