= North Line, Chennai Suburban =

Suburban railway line in Andhra Pradesh, India

North Line

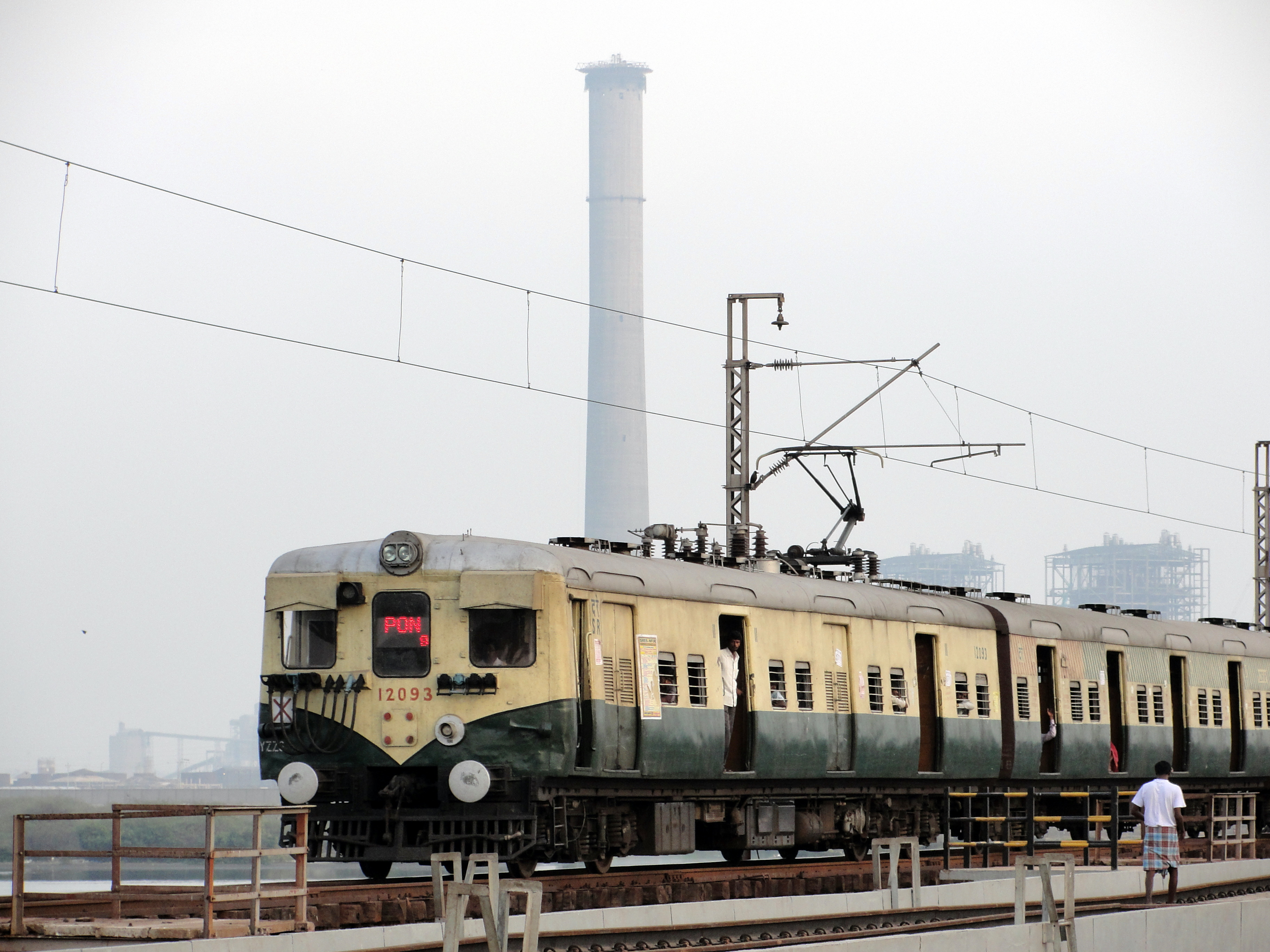

Overview
- Status: Operational
- Locale: Chennai (Madras), India
- Termini: Chennai Central Moore Market Complex (MMC); Bitragunta (Andhra Pradesh)
- Stations: 30

Service
- Type: Suburban railway
- System: Chennai Suburban Railway
- Operator: Southern Railway (India)
- Daily ridership: 120,000

Technical
- Line length: 210 kilometres (130 mi) (82 km Suburban and 128 km MEMU)
- Track gauge: Broad Gauge
- Operating speed: 90 km/h (maximum service speed)
Route map
Chennai Central MMC — Bitragunta

The North Line of the Chennai Suburban Railway is the third-longest suburban rail line in the system, running north from Chennai Central MMC to Bitragunta in Andhra Pradesh. Suburban services terminate at Sullurpeta and MEMU services operate to Bitragunta. As of 2013, more than 100,000 people use trains on the 46-km line between Chennai Central and Gummidipoondi every day, up from less than 80,000 in 2010. By 2017, this has increased to 120,000 people per day.

== Sections ==
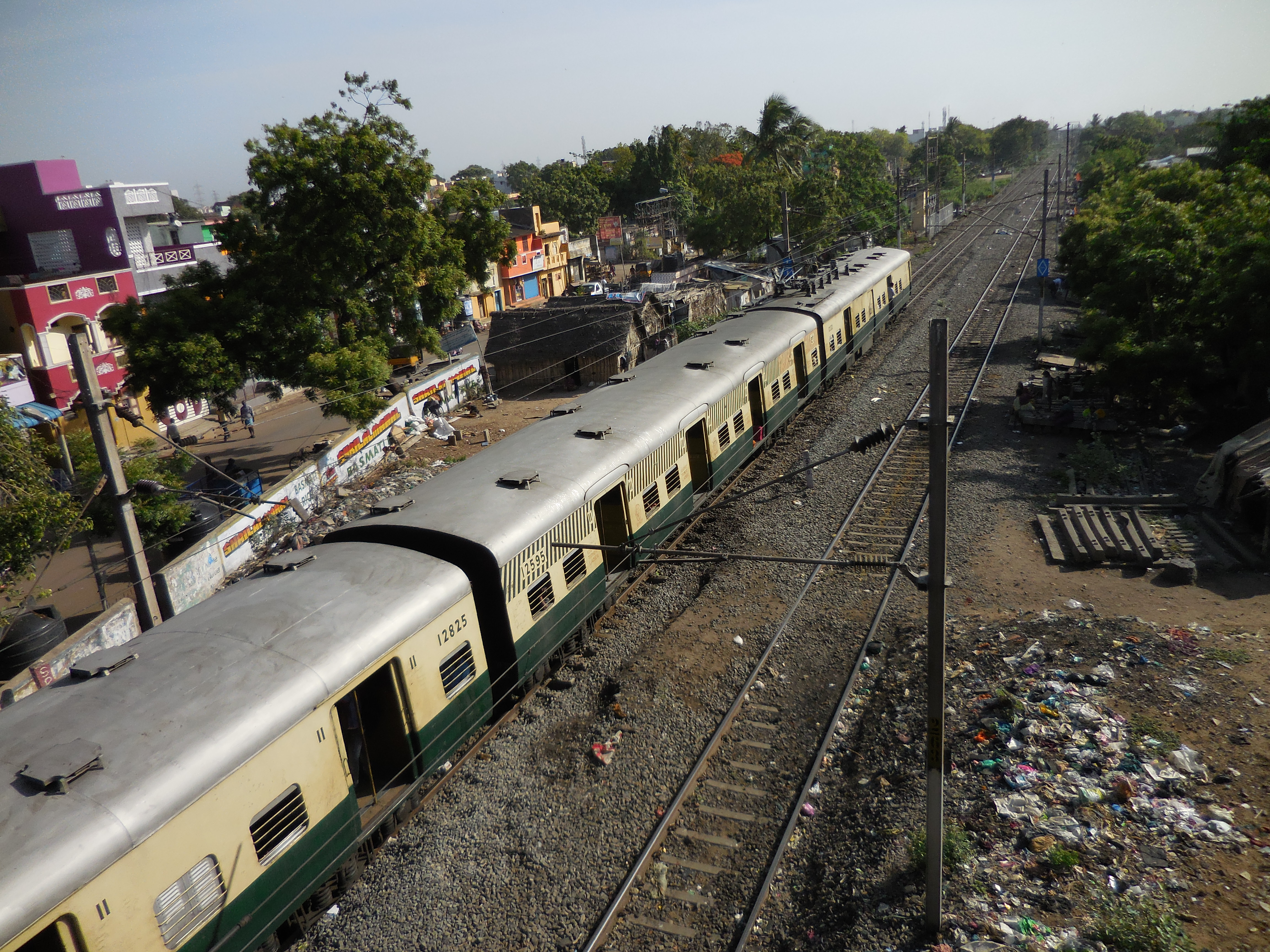
The North line near Washermanpet, Chennai

=== Chennai Central MMC - Gummidipoondi ===
- Suburban trains; runs on two dedicated 3rd and 4th lines between Chennai Central - Athipattu (0 - 22 km) .
- Suburban trains; runs on two main lines from Athipattu to Gummidipoondi (22 km - 46 km).

==== Problems in the north line ====
Commuters on the Chennai Central-Gummidipoondi suburban line are concerned about irregular train services, poor maintenance and lack of amenities such as drinking water, public convenience and security in the stations. They feel that the services and amenities provided on the Chennai Central-Thiruvallur-Arakkonam and the Chennai Beach-Tambaram-Chengalpattu sections are much better.

Trains are scheduled to transit between Gummidipoondi and Chennai Central in 80 minutes, but trains they usually take 120 minutes to cover the 46 kilometres (29 mi). It is common for trains to wait for clearance at signals between Ennore-Chennai Central. All the trains are always late by 20 to 30 minutes.

=== Gummidipoondi - Sulurpeta (AP) ===
- Suburban trains; runs on two main lines.

=== Sulurpeta(AP) - Bitragunta (AP) ===
- MEMU trains run between Chennai Central MMC and Nellore to be extended to Bitragunta.
- Passenger trains run between Chennai Central MMC and Bitragunta via Nellore.

== Expansion ==
The third and fourth lines in the route is being laid at a cost of ₹ 2,750 million. The memorandum of understanding (MoU) for exchange of land between the Southern Railways and Chennai Port Trust was signed in 2015 to commission the third and fourth lines. The fourth line between Chennai Beach and Athipattu costs ₹ 1200 million running to a length of 22.1 km. The third line between Athipattu and Korukkupet was commissioned at a cost of ₹ 1,550 million, running for a length of 18 km and the fourth line in the section between Tiruvottiyur and Ennore for a length of 7 km was commissioned on 24 June 2017. The third line between Chennai Beach and Korukkupet will run for a length of 4.1 km at a cost of ₹ 1,420 million and is expected to be completed by March 2018.
