= A. V. Anand =

Background information
- Born: 16 April 1936 (age 90); Bangalore, Mysore, Indian Empire
- Genre: Carnatic music
- Instruments: mridangam
- Years active: 1947 - present
- Award: Sangeet Natak Akademi Fellowship (2024-2025)

A. V. Anand (born 16 April 1936) is a Carnatic musician and mridangam player. Anand started his training in play mridangam by ghatam player K. S. Manjunath of Pudukkottai tradition from at the age of six . Subsequently, he gave his first public performance at the age ten, and the age eleven, he accompanied violinist T. Chowdiah at a concert. He has worked as an accompanist for Carnatic musicians, including Chowdiah, Chembai, T. R. Mahalingam, S. Balachander. and Doraiswamy Iyengar, since the 1950s.

Anand has Presided over the 41st Music conference held by Bangalore Gayana Samaja, from 5–11 October 2009.

In June 2026, AV Anand was elected for Sangeet Natak Akademi Fellowship (2024-2025), the highest award of Sangeet Natak Akademi, India's National Academy for Performing arts, in recognition of his overall contribution to the performing arts.

== Awards and honors ==
- Naada Nidhi by Avadhoota Datta Peetham, Mysore
- Sangeetha Kala Ratna by the Bangalore Gayana Samaja, a Carnatic music organization, in 2009.
- Karnataka Kalashree
- Guru Kala Bhushana
- Honorary performance
- Sangeet Natak Akademi Fellowship (2024-2025)
