= Daya Prakash Sinha =

India writer (1935–2025)

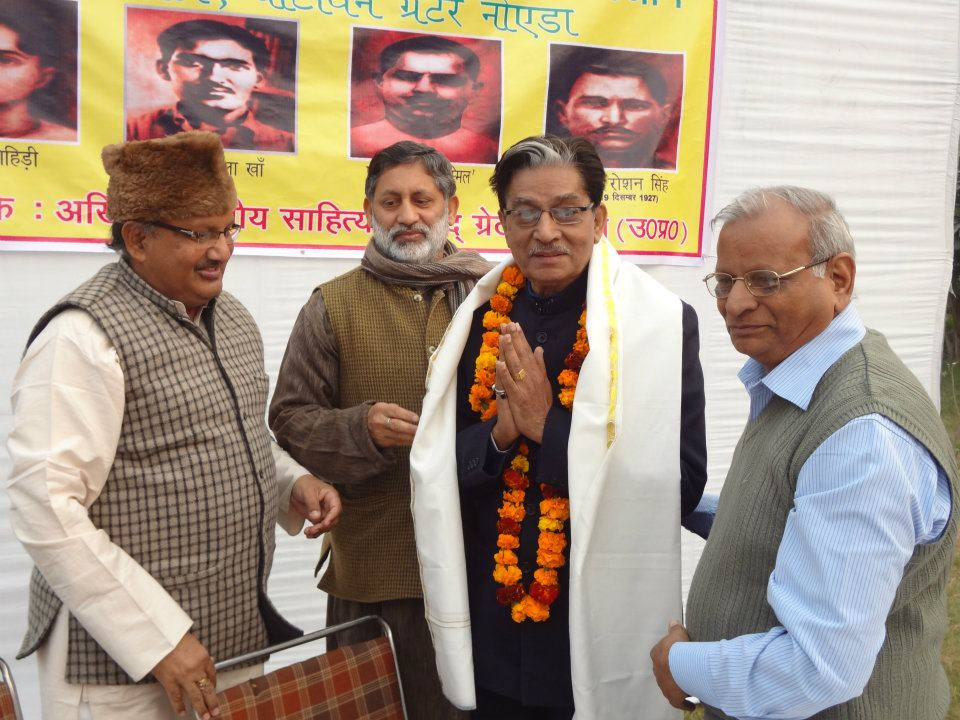
- Born: 2 May 1935; Kasganj, United Provinces of Agra and Oudh, British India
- Died: 7 November 2025 (aged 90); Noida, Uttar Pradesh, India
- Education: Master's degree
- Occupations: Civil servant; writer; dramatist; playwright
- Writing career
- Notable awards: Padma Shri

Daya Prakash Sinha (2 May 1935 – 7 November 2025), also known as D. P. Sinha, was an Indian IAS officer, who served as the national convener for BJP Cultural Cell and vice-president of Indian Council for Cultural Relations (ICCR). He was also a director, writer, dramatist and playwright, known for his Hindi plays such as Samraat Ashok, Seedhiyan, Katha Ek Kans Ki, Itihas Chakra and Rakt Abhishek. He was a recipient of Padma Shri, the fourth-highest civilian award in the Republic of India. His theatrical works have been published and staged for 50 years and translated into many languages.

== Life and career ==
=== Early life and civil service ===
Sinha was born on 2 May 1935 in Kasganj. After earning a master's degree, he continued to study for government exams. He couldn't clear the UPSC examination and joined PCS in 1952. Where he was promoted to IAS for Uttar Pradesh. In 1993, he retired as a director of cultural affairs. During his four-decade-long tenure, he held many cultural positions and promoted performing arts in India. He also served as the chairman of Lalit Kala Akademi, Uttar Pradesh from 1986 to 1988.

=== Theatrical literature ===
Sinha developed an interest in theatre from a young age. He started his performing arts career as an actor in a Laxminarayan Lal's play, Taj Mahal ke aanso. Soon he debuted in playwriting and composed thirteen plays, including Mere Bhai Mere, Itihaas Chakra, Man Ke Bhanvar, Panchtantra, and Dushman, many of which were staged by theatrical directors. His first drama titled SanjhSavere was published in 1957. He married a theatre artist in 1962 and continued writing and doing theatre. His play Katha Ek Kans Ki was prescribed in the syllabuses of 5 universities of India, including University of Delhi. In 1978, he lost his wife.

In 2019, his collection of plays was launched in three volumes under the title Natya-Samagra in the presence of Culture and Tourism Minister, Prahlad Singh Patel at the Sahitya Akademi Auditorium.

=== Death ===
Sinha died on 7 November 2025, at the age of 90.

== Awards ==
- Sahitya Academy Award 2021 for Samraat Ashok.
- Padma Shri for his contributions in the field of Arts
- Sangeet Natak Akademi Award
- Lohia Sahitya Samman by the then Prime Minister, Atal Behari Vajpayee
- Sardar Vallabh Bhai Patel Award
- Chaman Lal Memorial Award for Lifetime Achievement in theatre

== Selected books ==
- Saadar Aapka – ISBN 978-9350725528
- Dusman Urf Sainya Magan Pahalwani Mein - ISBN 978-9350723906
- Samrat Ashok – ISBN 978-9350728734
- Hasya Ekanki – ISBN 978-9350723913
- Itihas – ISBN 978-9386799920
- Man Ke Bhanwar – ISBN 978-9350728772
- Seeriyaa – ISBN 978-8181437716
- Oh America! – ISBN 978-8181433121
