= Nandiambakkam =

- Neighbourhood
- Nandiambakkam, Tiruvallur district, Tamil Nadu, India
- Coordinates: 13.2623°N 80.2851°E
- Country: India
- State: Tamil Nadu
- District: Tiruvallur
- City: Chennai
- Elevation: 50 m (160 ft)

Languages
  - Official: Tamil
- Time zone: UTC+5:30 (IST)
- PIN: 600120
- Vehicle registration: TN-18
- Metro city: Chennai
- Lok Sabha constituency: Tiruvallur
- Vidhan Sabha constituency: Ponneri

Nandiambakkam is a suburb in northern part of Chennai, Tiruvallur district, Tamil Nadu, India. It is a northern part of Chennai city. It has a population of around 17,000 people. The neighbourhood is served by Nandiambakkam railway station, of the Chennai Suburban Railway Network, and the following MTC bus services: Minjur–Madras High court, Minjur-Ennore, and Minjur-CMBT.

Nandiambakkam is suburban places of Chennai which is growing in terms of education, industrialization, agriculture which is expanding by leaps and bounds. Minjur in its area wise twice than that of Thiruvottiyur and thrice of Ponneri is very much near to Nandiambakkam.

Minjur desalination plant which supplies 100 million litres of water per day to Chennai city was inaugurated on 31 July 2010.

Outer Ring Road (ORR) which connects Southern Chennai (Vandalur on NH 45) to Northern Chennai (Minjur) is a main part of the CMDA's Second Master Plan for the greater Chennai, which covers Nandiambakkam region with much development in process the village and town next to it are slowly becoming residential place for people in the greater Chennai.
