= Rama Vaidyanathan =

Indian bharatnatyam artist from Delhi

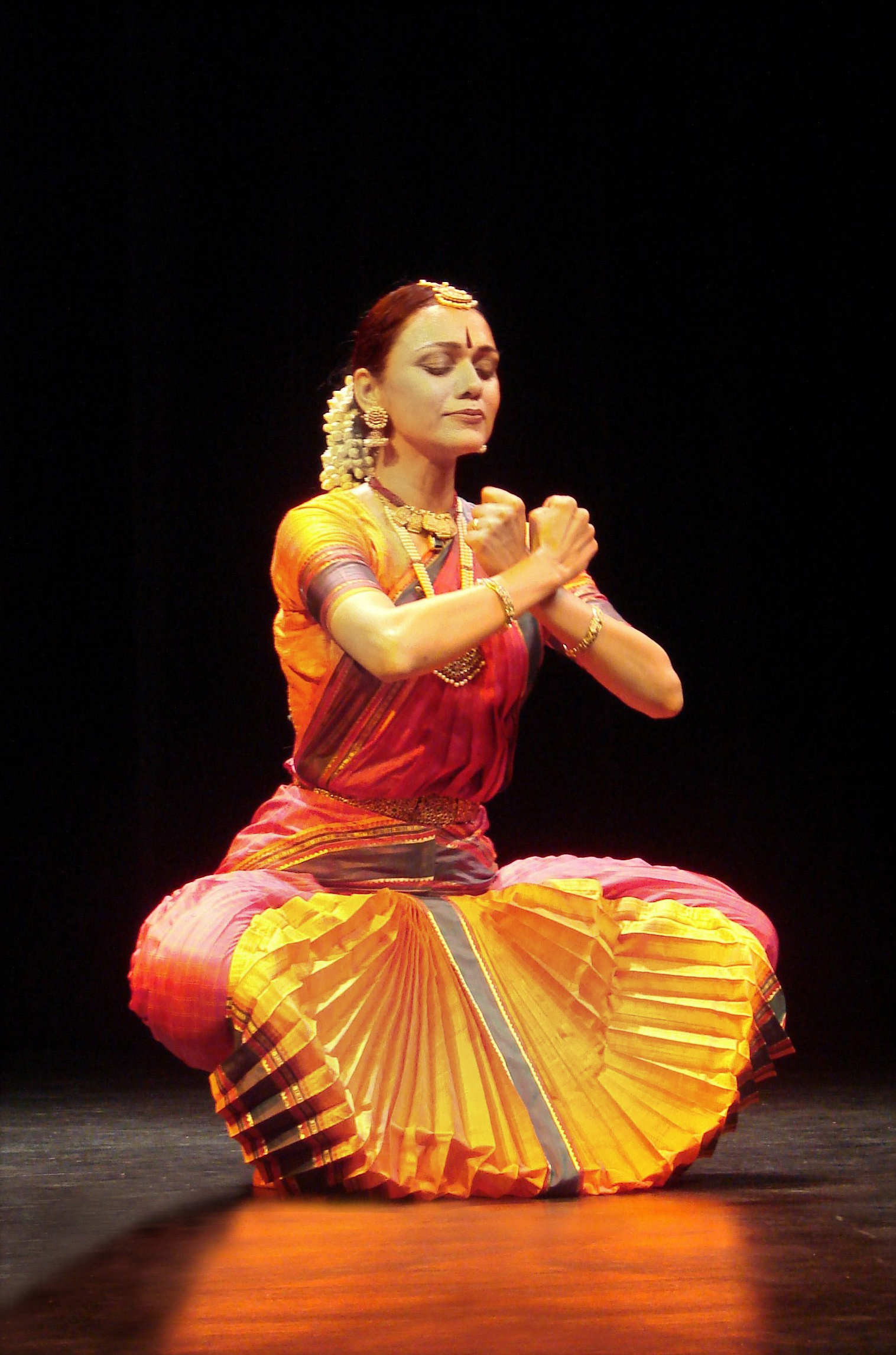
Rama Vaidyanathan in 2009

Rama Vaidyanathan is an Indian bharatnatyam artist from Delhi.

She is the President of Ganesa Natyalaya.

She is married to C. V. Kamesh, formerly a CXO at Hitachi India, and son of Saroja Vaidyanathan.

Rama Vaidyanathan received the Kerala Sangeetha Nataka Akademi Award in 2013, and the Sangeet Natak Akademi Award in 2017.
