= R. C. Mehta =

Indian singer and musicologist

Ramanlal C. Mehta (31 October 1918 – 18 October 2014) was an Indian musician and musicologist. In 2009, he was awarded the Padma Bhushan, India's third-highest civilian honour.

== Life ==
Ramanlal was a Gujarati who was born on 31 October 1918 in Surat in the state of Gujarat. He retired in 1978, from the MS University of Baroda, after serving as Principal of the College of Indian Music, Dance & Dramatics / Faculty of Performing Arts for several years. He died after a fall in 2014 at the age of 95.

== Musical career ==
He was trained in Hindustani classical vocal music by Kanchalal Manawala and later followed the Kirana style of Ustad Abdul Waheed Khan. He was with All India Radio for 9 years (1945–1953) prior to his taking up principal-ship of the Baroda Music College. A vocalist of the Kirana Gharana Style, he developed his own style in Khyal and Thumri and gave several vocal concerts of Hindustani Classical Music in music circles, at music conferences and over All India Radio. He composed and produced more than fifty musical dramas and features over A.I.R., Bombay, Ahmedabad and Baroda (1945–1953).

== Academic ==
Mehta worked in music education in India for over 45 years, serving as an expert member at national and state institutions and universities. He founded the Indian Musicological Society in 1970 and later served the society as honorary General Secretary. He served as editor of the Journal of the Indian Musicological Society, since its 1970 inception, retiring in 2005. He also served as an expert member on the Central Music Audition Board (MAB) of All India Radio. On his suggestion, the first-ever conference on distance education in Indian Classical Music was organised by Ustad Alauddin Khan Sangeet Academy. He also published a collection of papers presented as Distance Education in Music.

== Awards and honours ==
- Sangeet Natak Akademi Fellowship (2008)
- Padma Bhushan (2009)
