= Government Central Press, Chennai =

Coordinates: 13.103542°N 80.280084°E

The Government Central Press in Chennai houses the stationery and printing department of the Tamil Nadu government, undertaking the printing works of the state government and maintenance of government records. Presently, it has eight branch presses and stationery stores functioning under its control. In 2017, the department had 1,646 employees, including 433 women.

== History ==
The building was constructed in 1807 by the English East India Company. The Government Central Press was established on 17 December 1831.

== The building ==
The L-shaped single-storey building is built in a land covering 5.5 acres and is spread over an area of 36,000 square feet. The store house in the complex was gutted in a fire in June 2013. In 2017, the government proposed to renovate the structure at a cost of about ₹ 125 million.

== Overview ==
The Government Central Press is located at Mint Buildings in Mint Street, George Town. Its land covers an area of 5.5 acres. The Press has 880 employees.

The Press includes the Government Central Press, Government Stationery Stores, and Government Branch Press at the Madras High Court Buildings, all within the city. The branch presses are located at Madurai, Trichy, Salem, Pudukkottai, Vridhachalam, and the Madras High Court Bench at Madurai.

The chief functions of the Government Central Press include the printing of gazettes, assembly debates, reports, budget documents, bulletins, election papers, reports of the Accountant General, registration certificates of motor vehicles, letterheads and letter pads of government dignitaries, government codes and manuals, periodicals, forms and registers, and government examination materials.

The Government Stationery Stores is the centralised agency for the annual supply of stationery articles to the government.

The Government Branch Press at the High Court Buildings caters to the printing needs of the Madras High Court.

== See also ==
- Heritage structures in Chennai
