= Sudharani Raghupathy =

Indian classical Bharata Natyam dancer

- Born: 21 March 1944 (age 82); Pollachi, British India
- Education: University of Mysore
- Occupations: Dancer, Choreographer, Teacher and Author
- Known for: Bharatanatyam
- Father: H L Jagannath
- Awards: Padma Shri Award, Sangeet Natak Akademi Award

Sudharani Raghupathy (born March 21, 1944) is an Indian classical Bharatanatyam dancer and choreographer. She is the author of Laghu Bharatam, a series of 3 handbooks on Bharatanatyam dance. She is the Founder and Trustee of Shree Bharatalaya, Chennai. Sudharani popularised Bharatanatyam through lecture demonstrations.

In 2025, she was awarded the Sangeet Natak Akademi Fellowship, the highest award of Sangeet Natak Akademi, India's National Academy for Performing arts, for her contribution to Indian dance.

== Education and Career ==
She studied Philosophy and Sociology in the University of Mysore and majored in the World history of dance, Studio arts at Randolph Macon's Women's College, Virginia, USA in the years 1964-65. She learnt the Martha Graham technique in modern dance from Eleanor Struppa and Western music from Elaine St. Vincent. In the field of Bharatanatyam she trained under KP Kittappa Pillai, US Krishna Rao and Mylapore Gowri Ammal. In Carnatic music she was a student under T Chowdiah, Vaggeyakara and Vidwan Madurai N Krishnan.

== Awards ==
Sudharani has received Padma Shri in 1981, Sangeet Natak Akademi award in 1984, Kalaimamani in 1981, Sapthagiri Sangeetha Vidwanmani in 1996, Kalashree in 1999, Fellow of Sangeet Natak Akademi in June 2026

== Personal ==
Sudharani was born to H. L. Jagannath and Shakuntala on 21 March 1944 in Pollachi. She was married to Raghupathy until his death in May 2020. Their children are Sidhartha and Anirudha. She is also the great-grand-daughter-in-law of eminent lawyer Sir K S Iyengar who lived in Mylapore in 1923.
