= Laxminarayan Lal =

Indian novelist and critic (1927–1987)

- Born: 4 March 1927; Jalalpur, Uttar Pradesh, India
- Died: 20 November 1987 (aged 60); Delhi, India
- Occupations: Playwright; critic; novelist
- Writing career
- Notable works: Lanka Khand; Dharti ki Ankhein

Laxminarayan Lal (4 March 1927 – 20 November 1987) was an Indian playwright, critic, and novelist. He worked in many genres of literature but was primarily known as a playwright.

== Early life ==
Laxminarayan Lal was born on 4 March 1927 in Jalalpur, Basti district of Uttar Pradesh. He earned a Doctor of Philosophy degree with his thesis on "Development of the craft method of Hindi stories". During his childhood in a rural environment, Lal developed an interest in drama and theatrics. At a very early age, he was introduced to folk dramas like Ramlila, Nautanki, and Bidesia.

He died on 20 November 1987 in Delhi.

== Career ==
Lal was a novelist, playwright, and literary critic who produced various works in multiple genres.

=== Theatrical literature ===
Lal composed 35 full-length plays. He wrote his first play, Andha Kuan, in 1955. He continued to write plays while running a theater center in Allahabad, where he offered both theatrical training and performance with limited resources.

His plays often explore the experiences of ordinary life from a deeper perspective. His use of mythological-historical settings as well as realistic environments, experimentation with symbols and imagery, and portrayals of complex human relations—especially male-female relationships—connect his plays to their cultural context. He is considered an important playwright of the post-independence era.

=== Fiction ===
In addition to being a playwright, Lal was a storyteller and novelist. In 1951, his first novel, Dharti Ki Aankhen, was published, followed by others. His novels often depict middle-class civic and rural life. Various aspects of love, along with realistic and poignant glimpses of life, are central themes. His work sometimes portrays cultural struggles within the context of middle-class conflict and the clash between new circumstances and orthodox ideals. Along with the inclusion of folk life and elements in the style, symbolism is also prominent.

Lal’s short stories often featured experiences of rural life and explored both internal and external perspectives, focusing on the inner world of the mind as well as the outer world of political and economic pressure. Along with exploring the reality and psychology of male-female relationships, these stories also depict the complex economic and social problems of villages.

=== Review work ===
Lal's PhD dissertation focused on storytelling. In addition to his thesis "Shilp Vidhi Ka Vikas of Hindi Stories," his book Modern Hindi Story, written for the Sahitya Akademi, is also a work of literary review.

His experience as a writer and in theater informed his contributions to the field of theatrical review. His books Theatre and The Role of Drama and Modern Hindi Drama and Theatre are enriched by personal experience and his study of Indian and Western theatrical traditions. His book Parsi Hindi Theatre outlines the history and characteristics of Parsi theatre.

=== Other activities ===
Lal was directly involved in various aspects of Rangakarma, including working as a theatre director and actor. The first play he directed was his own Mada Cactus. He directed and acted in many other plays as well. The establishment of Natya Kendra (1958) in Allahabad and Samvad (1967) in Delhi demonstrates his commitment to the theater. He taught drama at colleges in India and worked as a drama producer on All India Radio.

== Published works ==
=== Drama ===
- Andha Kuan (1956)
- Maada Kaiktas (1959)
- Sundar Raash (1959)
- Sukha Sarovar (1960)
- Natak tota Maina (1962)
- Ratrani (1962)
- Darpan (1964)
- Suryamukh (1968)
- Kalki (1969)
- Mr Abhimanyu (1971)
- Curfew (1972)
- Dusra Darwaja (1972)
- Abdullah Deewana (1973)
- Yaksha Prashna (1974)
- Vyaktigat (1974)
- Ek Satya Harishchandra (1976)
- Sagun Panchi (1977)
- Sab Rang Mohbhang (1977)
- Ram ki Ladaai (1979)
- Punch Purush
- Lanka Khand
- Ganga Mati
- Narasimha Katha
- Chandrama

=== Solitary Collections ===
- Parvat ke Peechhe (1952)
- Nāṭaka bahurūpī (1964)
- Taajamahal ke Aansoo (1970)
- Mere Shreshth Ekaankee (1972)

=== Novels ===
- Dharatee kee Aankhen (1951)
- Baya ka Ghonsala Aur Saamp (1951)
- Kaale Phool ka Paudha (1951)
- Rupajiva (1959)
- Badi Champa Choti Champa
- Mana Vrindavan
- Prem Ek Apavitr Nadee (1972)
- Apna-Apna Raakshas (1973)
- Badke Bhaiya (1973)
- Hara Samandar Gopi Chander (1974)
- Vasant kee Prateeksha (1975)
- Shrngaar (1975)
- Devina (1976)
- Purushottam

=== Stories ===
- Aane Waala kal (1957)
- Lady Doctor (1958)
- Sune Aangan Ras Barsai (1960)
- Naye Svar Nayee Rekhaen
- Ek Aur khani
- Ek Bund Jaal
- Dakuu Aaye (1974)
- Meree Pratinidhi kahaaniyaan

=== Research & Review ===
- Hindee kahaaniyon kee Shilp-vidhi ka Vikaas (1953)
- Adhunik Hindi Kahani
- Rungmanch aur Unki Bhumika
- Parsi Hindi Rangmanch
- Aadhunik Hindi Natak and Rangmanch
- Rangmanch: Dekhna and Jaanana

== Legacy ==
Lal's work as a playwright was honored by the Sangeet Natak Akademi in 1977. His literary contributions also earned him awards from the Sahitya Kala Parishad in 1979 and the Hindi Academy in 1987.

== See also ==
- Mahadevi Verma
- Bharatendu Harishchandra
