= Pichu Sambamoorthi =

Indian musicologist (1901–1973)

- Born: 14 February 1901; Bitragunta, Madras Presidency, India
- Died: 23 October 1973 (aged 72)
- Occupations: Musicologist; Writer
- Years active: 1928–1973
- Known for: Music academics
- Spouse: Anandavalli
- Awards: Padma Bhushan; Sangeetha Kalanidhi

Pichu Sambamoorthi (1901–1973) was an Indian musicologist, writer and the professor of musicology at the Sri Venkateswara University, Tirupati. He was the author several books on music, including A Dictionary of South Indian Music and Musicians, Great composers, South Indian Music, Sruthi Vadyas (Drones) and Laya Vadyas: Time-Keeping Instruments. He was awarded the Madras Music Academy's Sangeetha Kalanidhi in 1972. The Government of India awarded him the third highest civilian honour of the Padma Bhushan, in 1971, for his contributions to music. He was also a 1963 recipient of the Sangeet Natak Akademi Fellowship.

== Biography ==
Born on 14 February 1901 at Bitragunta, a small village in the erstwhile Madras Presidency (presently in Guntur district, Andhra Pradesh), Sambamoorthi trained in vocals and violin under various teachers such as Boddu Krishniah, M. Doraiswami Iyer, S. A. Ramaswami Iyer and Krishnaswami Bhagavatar. He started his career in 1928, as a member of faculty of music at Queen Mary's College but moved to Germany, in 1931, under a grant from Deutsche Akademie, and studied musicology at the academy, simultaneously learning Hochschule für Musik und Theater München, then known as Staatliche Akademie der Tonkunst. On his return to India, he joined Madras University as a lecturer and, later, a Reader in Music, and continued there till 1961 when he joined Sangita Vadyalaya, Chennai, as its director. In 1964, he was appointed as the Professor of Musicology at Sri Venkateswara University, Tirupati, a post he held for two years, till his return to Madras University in 1966.

Sambamoorthi was associated with several universities in India, including Banaras Hindu University, under a University Grants Commission programme. He published over 50 books which included a six-volume treatise, South Indian Music and a two-volume biographical account, Great Composers. The Catalogue of Musical Instruments, on display at the Government Museum, Chennai, was prepared by him in 1962, which has since gone into several re-prints. He received the third highest civilian honour of the Padma Bhushan from the Government of India in 1971. A year later, he was selected for the Sangeetha Kalanidhi award by the Madras Music Academy.

Sambamoorthi, who was married to Anandavalli, died on 23 October 1973, at the age of 72. His life and work have been documented in a book, Prof. Sambamoorthy, the Visionary Musicologist, published by Madras Music Academy, in connection with his birth centenary in 2001.

== Selected bibliography ==
=== English ===
- P. Sambamoorthy (1929). South Indian music series. Indian Music Publishing House.
- P. Sambamoorthy (1929). The Melakarta Janya-Raga Scheme: With an Explanatory Chart and Two Appendices. Indian Music Publishing House.
- P. Sambamoorthy (1933). South Indian Music Series ... (South Indian Music.) Illustrated with tables. Second edition, revised and enlarged. Madras.
- P. Sambamoorthy (1935). Syama Sastri and other Famous Figures of South Indian Music. Indian Music Publishing House.
- P. Sambamoorthy (1952). A Dictionary of South Indian Music and Musicians (3 volumes). Indian Publishing House.
- P. Sambamoorthy (1957). Sruti Vadyas: (drones). All India Handicrafts Board.
- P. Sambamoorthy (1959). Laya Vadyas: Time-keeping Instruments. All India Handicrafts Board.
- P. Sambamoorthy (1962). Great Composers (2 volumes). Indian Music Publishing House.
- P. Sambamoorthy (1963). South Indian music (6 volumes). Indian Music Pub. House.
- P. Sambamoorthy (1967). Tyagaraja. National Book Trust.
- Government Museum (Madras, India); P. Sambamoorthy (1976). Catalogue of Musical Instruments: Exhibited in the Government Museum, Chennai. Principal Commissioner of Museums, Government Museum.
- P. Sambamoorthy (1982). The Flute. Indian music Publishing House.
- P. Sambamoorthy (1984). Aids to the teaching of music. Indian Music Pub. House.
- P. Sambamoorthy (1985). Great musicians: giving biographical sketches and critical estimates of 15 of the musical luminaries of the post-Tyagaraja period. Indian Music Pub. House.
- P. Sambamoorthy (2006). Elements of Western Music for Students of Indian Music. Indian Music Publishing House.

=== Tamil ===
- P. Sambamoorthy (1957). Kirtana sagaram (5 volumes). Indian Music Publishing House.
- P. Sambamoorthy (2006). கர்னாடக ஸங்கீத புஸ்தகம்: முதல் பாகம். Indian Music Publishing House.
- P. Sambamoorthy (2009). Practical course in karnatic music (3 volumes). Indian Music Publishing House.

== See also ==
- Hochschule für Musik und Theater München
- Deutsche Akademie
- Madras Music Academy
