= Sunil Kothari =

Indian academic (1933–2020)

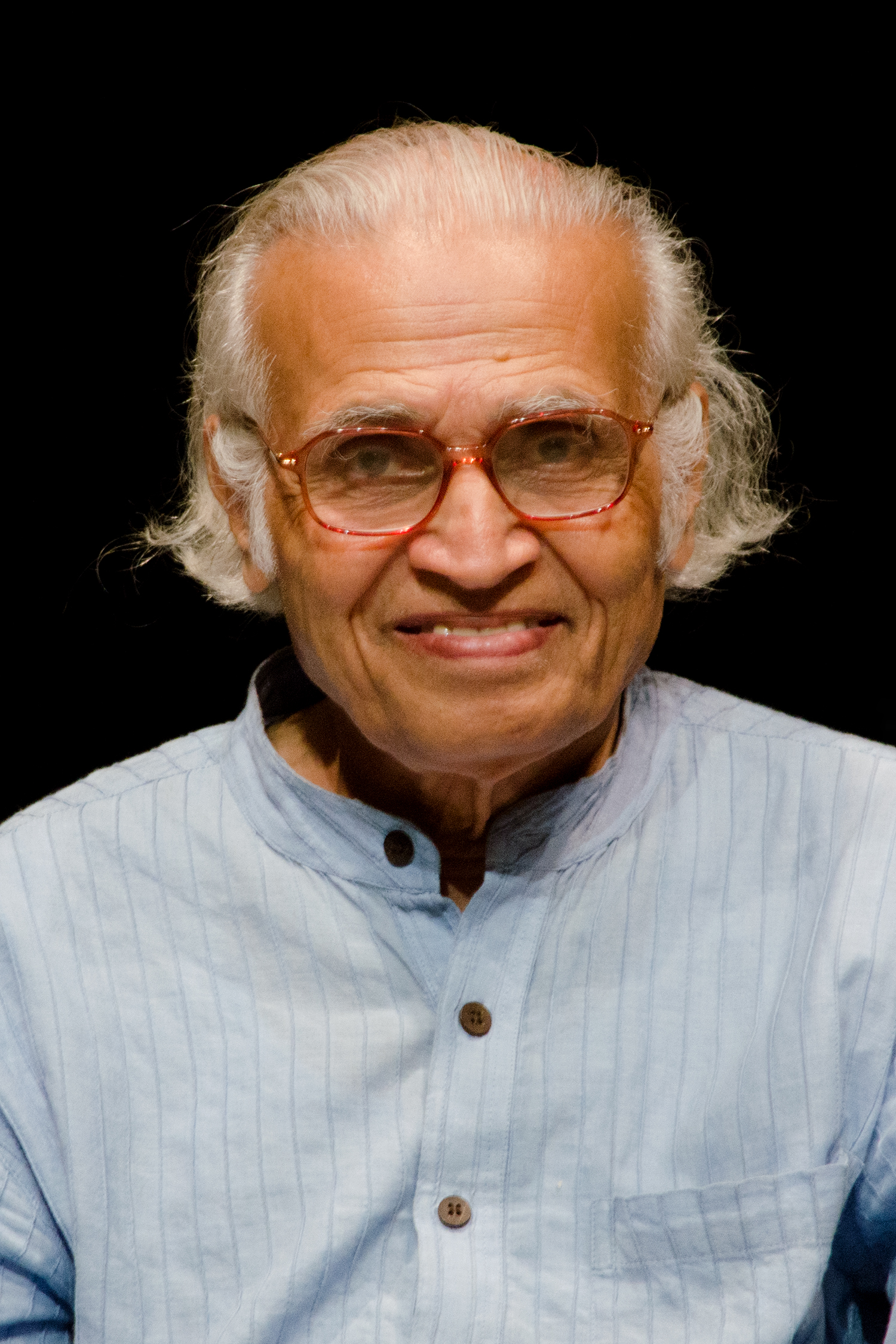
- Sunil Kothari in 2015
- Born: 20 December 1933
- Died: 27 December 2020 (aged 87)
- Occupation: Classical dance critic
- Years active: 1956 – 2020
- Known for: Indian classical dance
- Awards: Padma Shri (2001)

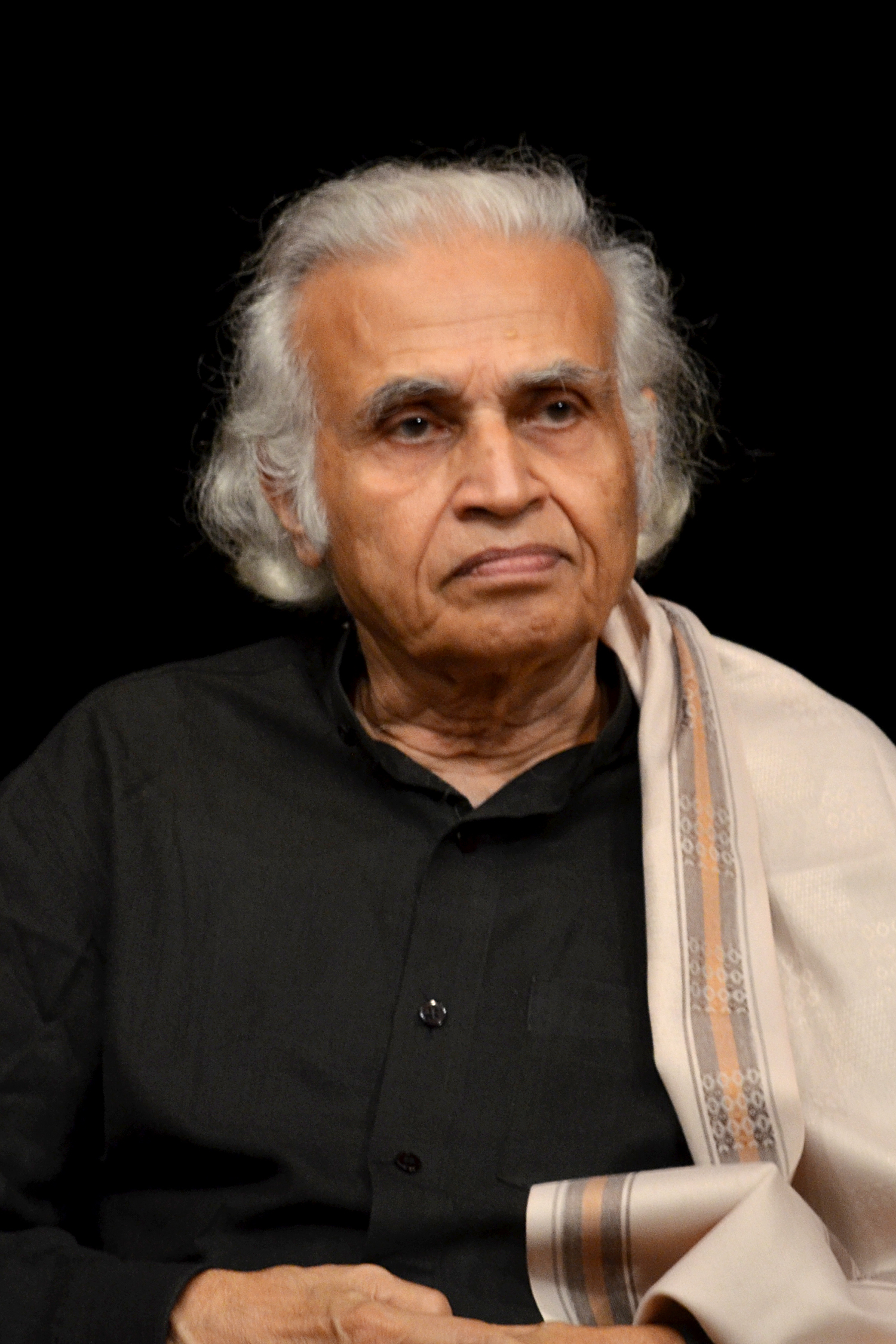
Dr. Sunil Kothari in 2014

Sunil Kothari (20 December 1933 – 27 December 2020) was a noted Indian dance historian, scholar and critic. He was also former Uday Shankar Professor at Ravindra Bharti University, Kolkata.

== Career ==
He completed M. A. in 1964 and PhD in 1977. Professionally, Sunil Kothari was a chartered accountant. He started his career with The Times of India. He also taught at Sydenham College of Commerce and Economics. He freelanced as a writer. He lived in Asian Games Village in Delhi.

== Death ==
He died on 27 December 2020 due to a cardiac arrest caused by COVID-19 complications.

== Awards ==
He received Padma Shri award in 2001. He also received Sangeet Natak Akademi award in 1995 for overall contribution to the Indian classical dance. He was awarded Kumar Chandrak in 1961 and Ranjitram Suvarna Chandrak in 2012.

== Bibliography ==
He has written 12 books on different forms of Indian classical dance and allied art-forms.

- Bharata Natyam: Indian Classical Dance Art
- Odissi: Indian Classical Dance Art
- Rasa: The Indian Performing Arts in the Last 25 Years
- Kuchipudi: Indian Classical Dance Art
- Photo Biography of Rukmini Devi
- Kathak: Indian Classical Dance Art
- New Directions In Indian Dance
- Chhau Dances of India
- Damaru: Essays on Classical Dance, Music, Performing Arts, Folk Dances, Rituals, Crafts
