= Kapila Vatsyayan =

Indian politician

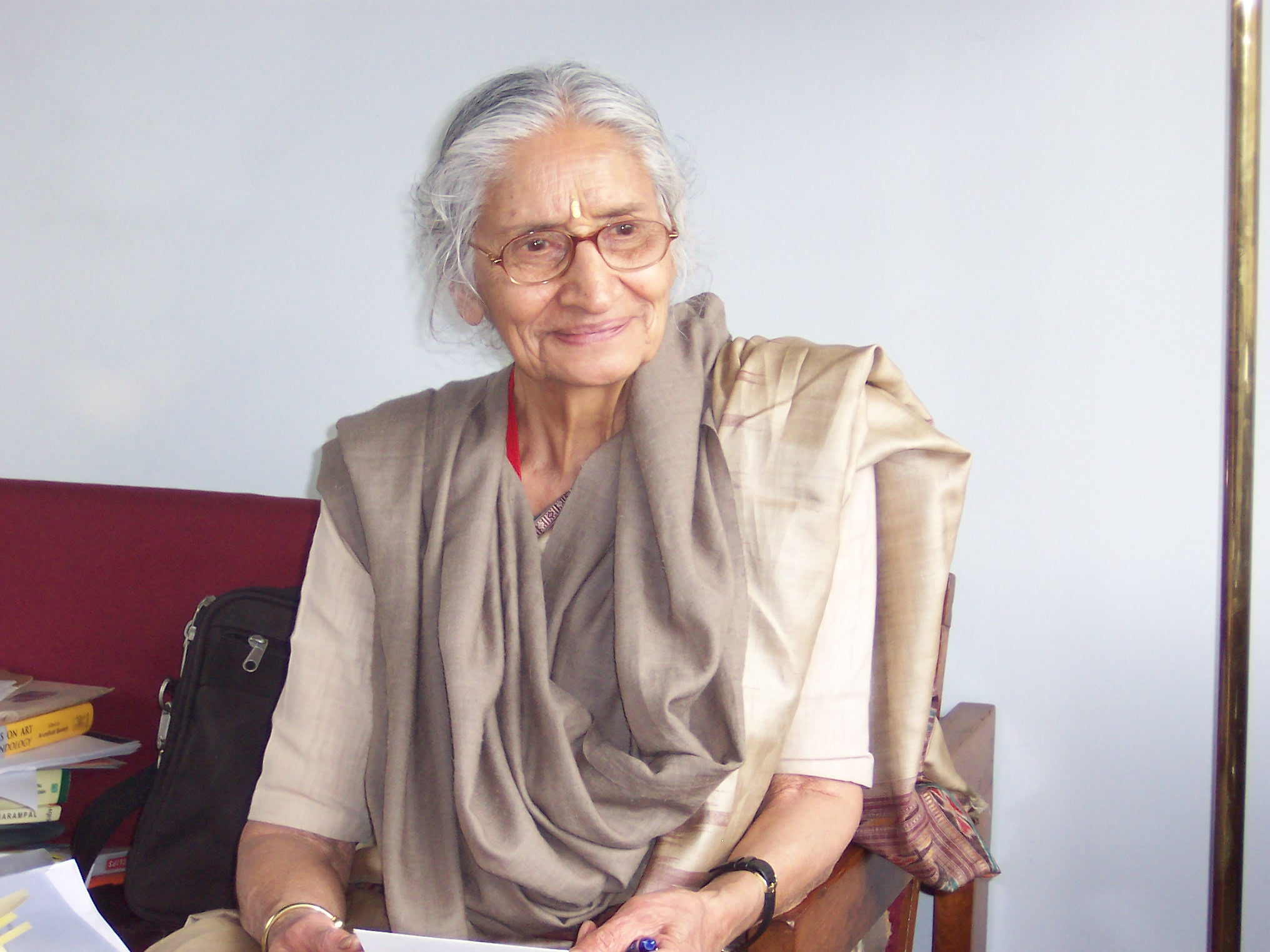
- Vatsyayan in 2006
- Born: 25 December 1928; Delhi
- Died: 16 September 2020 (aged 91)
- Education: Delhi University; University of Michigan; Banaras Hindu University
- Occupations: scholar, art historian
- Spouse: Sachchidananda Vatsyayan 'Agyeya' (1956-1969)

Kapila Vatsyayan (25 December 1928 – 16 September 2020) was a leading scholar of Indian classical dance, art, architecture, and art history. She served as a member of parliament and bureaucrat in India, and also served as the founding director of the Indira Gandhi National Centre for the Arts.

In 1970, Vatsyayan received the Sangeet Natak Akademi Fellowship, the highest honour conferred by the Sangeet Natak Akademi, India's national academy for music, dance and drama; this was followed by the Lalit Kala Akademi Fellowship, the highest honour in the fine arts conferred by Lalit Kala Akademi, India's national academy for fine arts in 1995. In 2011, the Government of India bestowed upon her the Padma Vibhushan, India's second highest civilian honour.

== Early life and background ==
She was born in Delhi to Ram Lal and Satyawati Malik. She earned an MA in English literature from Delhi University. Thereafter, she completed a second MA in Education at the University of Michigan, Ann Arbor, and a PhD at the Banaras Hindu University.

The poet and art critic Keshav Malik was her older brother, and she was married to the noted Hindi Writer S.H. Vatsyayan 'Ajneya' (1911–1987). They married in 1956 and separated in 1969.

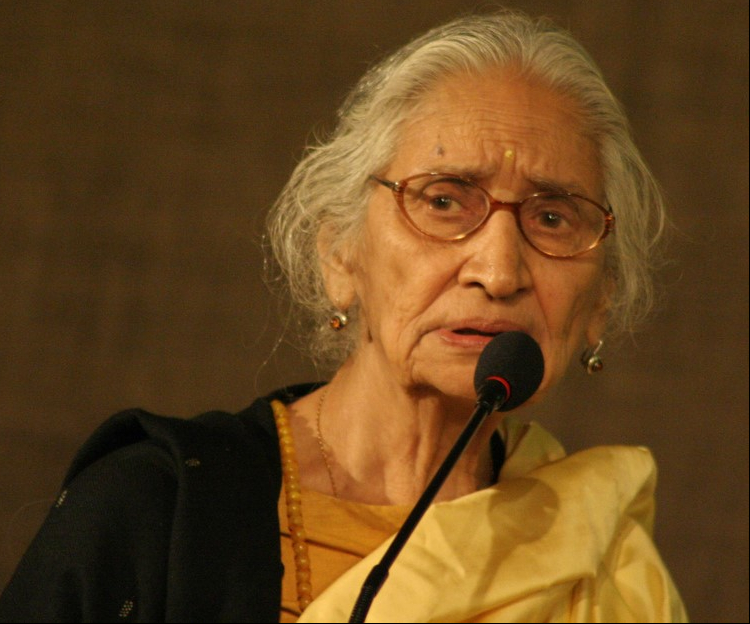
Kapila Vatsayan speaking at IGNCA

== Career ==
Vatsyayan authored many books, including The Square and the Circle of Indian Arts (1997), Bharata: The Natya Sastra (1996), and Matralaksanam (1988).

In 1987, she became the founder trustee and member secretary of the Indira Gandhi National Centre for the Arts (Indira Kalakendra), India's premier arts organisation, in Delhi. Thereafter, in 1993, she was made its academic director, a post she held until 2000, when she was retired by a BJP-led centre-right government.

In 2005, when an Indian National Congress-led centre-left government returned to power, she was made the chairperson of the institution. She also served as Secretary to the Government of India in the Ministry of Education, where she was responsible for the establishment of a large number of national institutions of higher education. She was the chairperson of the Asia Project at the India International Centre, New Delhi.

She is known for her collaboration with great artists, such as legendary Koodiyattam maestro Guru Mani Madhava Chakyar (1899-1990) and played pivotal role in safeguarding the legacy of classical Indian art forms.

She was nominated as a member of the Upper House of Parliament of India, the Rajya Sabha in 2006, though subsequently in March 2006, she resigned following an office of profit controversy. In April 2007, she was renominated to the Rajya Sabha, with a term expiring in February 2012.

== Death ==
Kapila Vatsyayan died on 16 September 2020, aged 92, at her home in New Delhi.

== Awards ==
Vatsyayan received the Sangeet Natak Akademi Fellowship in 1970. In the same year she was awarded a fellowship from the John D. Rockefeller 3rd Fund to survey cultural institutions and contemporary art developments in the United States and Indonesia. She was awarded the prestigious Jawaharlal Nehru Fellowship in 1975.

In 1992 the Asian Cultural Council honoured her with the John D. Rockefeller 3rd Award for outstanding professional achievement and her significant contribution to the international understanding, practice, and study of dance and art history in India.

In 1998, she received the "Outstanding Contribution to Dance Research" award, given by Congress on Research in Dance (CORD).

In 2000, she was a recipient of Rajiv Gandhi National Sadbhavana Award and in 2011, she was awarded the Padma Vibhushan by the Government of India.

== Bibliography ==
- Kapila Vatsyayan; Jayadeva (1980). Jāur Gīta-Govinda: a dated sixteenth century Gīta-Govinda from Mewar. National Museum.
- Kapila Vatsyayan (1982). Dance Sculpture in Sarangapani Temple. Society for Archaeological, Historical, and Epigraphical Research.
- Kapila Vatsyayan (1987). Traditions of Indian folk dance. Clarion Books associated with Hind Pocket Books. ISBN 9788185120225.
- Kapila Vatsyayan (1991). Concepts of Space: Ancient and Modern. Abhinav Publications. ISBN 978-81-7017-252-9.
- Kapila Vatsyayan (1992). Indian classical dance. Publications Division, Ministry of Information and Broadcasting, Govt. of India. ISBN 978-81-230-0589-8.
- Kapila Vatsyayan; Baidyanath Saraswati; Subhash Chandra Malik; Madhu Khanna (1994). Art, the Integral Vision: A Volume of Essay in Felicitation of Kapila Vatsyayan. D. K. Print World (P) Limited. ISBN 978-81-246-0029-0.
- Kapila Vatsyayan (1995). Paramparik bharatiya rangmanch: anant dharane. National Book Trust. ISBN 978-81-237-1432-5.
- Kapila Vatsyayan (1995). The Indian Arts, Their Ideational Background and Principles of Form. Affiliated East-West Press.
- Kapila Vatsyayan (1995). Prakŗti: The Integral Vision. D K Printworld (P) Limited. ISBN 978-81-246-0036-8.
- Kapila Vatsyayan (1997). The Square and the Circle of the Indian Arts. Abhinav Publications. ISBN 978-81-7017-362-5.
- Kapila Vatsyayan (2004). Dance in Indian Painting. Abhinav Publications. ISBN 978-81-7017-153-9.
- Kapila Vatsyayan (2006). Bharata The Natyasastra. Sahitya Akademi. ISBN 978-81-260-1808-6.
- Kapila Vatsyayan (2007). Classical Indian dance in literature and the arts. Sangeet Natak Akademi.
- Kapila Vatsyayan, ed. (2011). Transmissions and Transformations: Learning Through the Arts in Asia. Primus Books. pp. 9–. ISBN 978-93-80607-14-6.
- Kapila Vatsyayan (2011). The Darbhanga Gita-Govinda. Abhinav Publications. ISBN 978-81-7017-447-9.
- Kapila Vatsyayan (2011). Asian Dance: Multiple Levels. B.R. Rhythms. ISBN 978-81-88827-23-7.
- Kapila Vatsyayan (2013). Plural Cultures and Monolothic Structures. Primus Books. ISBN 978-93-80607-45-0.
