= Bitragunta =

- Village
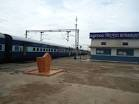
- Bitragunta Railway station
- Interactive map of Bitragunta
- Bitragunta's location in India.
- Coordinates: 14°46′N 79°59′E
- Country: India
- State: Andhra Pradesh
- District: Nellore District

Area
  - Total: 19.27 km^{2} (7.44 sq mi)
- Elevation: 19 m (62 ft)

Population (2011)
  - Total: 3,482
  - Density: 180.7/km^{2} (468.0/sq mi)
- Postal code: 524 xxx
- ISO 3166 code: IN-AP

Bitragunta is a village in Nellore District of the Indian state of Andhra Pradesh. It is located in Bogole mandal of Kavali revenue division. It forms a part of Nellore Urban Development Authority.
