= Kandaswami Temple, Georgetown =

Kandha Kottam Temple Tamil: கந்த கோட்டம் திருக்கோவில்
- Kandha Swāmi Temple (கந்த ஸ்வாமி திருக்கோவில்); Mutthu Kumāra Swāmi deva sthānam (முத்து குமார ஸ்வாமி தேவ ஸ்தானம்)
- Location in Chennai city

Religion
- Affiliation: Hinduism
- District: Chennai district
- Deity: Thiru Kandha Swāmi (Murugan) Shri Deivānai, Shri Valli; Thiru Mutthu Kumāra Swāmi Shri Deivānai, Shri Valli
- Festivals: ādi Kirutthigai, Panguni Utthiram.

Location
- Location: Parry's corner (Old: George town), Chennai city
- State: Tamil Nadu
- Country: India
- Coordinates: 13.0939°N 80.2839°E

Architecture
- Type: Dravidian architecture
- Completed: 1670s CE, early 1800s CE

Website
- kandhakottam.tnhrce.in

Kandaswami Temple (Tamil: கந்த சுவாமி கோவில்) is a Hindu temple dedicated to Murugan, located in the Parry's corner (Old: George Town) neighbourhood of Chennai city, in Tamil Nadu, India. It is also called 'Mutthu Kumāra Swāmi deva sthānam' (Tamil: முத்து குமார சுவாமி ஸ்தானம்) and popularly known as Kandha kottam (Tamil: கந்த கோட்டம்). It is managed by the Tamil Nadu Hindu religious and charitable endowments department of the government of Tamil Nadu. The Kandha kottam temple has associated educational institutions for music and dance classes; primary and high schools; and a college, in various locations. The Kandha kottam temple also performs social welfare initiatives like free medical clinics and free pharmacies.

== History ==
The original temple was constructed by Maari Chettiar in the 1670s. The existing temple was built with stone in the early 1800s. It has seen many renovations and is considered to be one of the finest in the neighbourhood. The area covered by the temple is about eight acres. The temple tank is 'Saravana Poigai' and the Sthala Viruksham (tree) is Magizham tree.

According to the stone inscriptions in the temple, the moolavar vigraham (main idol) of Murugan in this temple was discovered and brought from a tank bund near Thiru porur Shri Kandha Swāmi Temple. It is a famous Murugan temple situated on the Chennai to Mahabalipuram route and that vigraham was installed in this temple during the 1670s.

== Deities ==
Uthsava vigraham (festival idol) with consorts: Mutthu kumāra swāmi with Deivānai and Valli.

The moolavar vigraha Kandha swami (Murugan), which was brought from 'Thiru porur', is about two feet in height. His consorts Deivanai and Valli are on either side of this presiding deity. The utsava murti is known as Mutthu kumara swami, has consorts Deivanai and Valli. They are in a separate shrine the utsava mandapam. Next to the temple tank Saravana poigai, there is a shrine for Kulakkarai Vināyagar (Ganesha) with Siddhi and Buddhi as his consorts. There is a shrine nearby for Kāshi Vishwanādhar (Shiva) and Kāshi Vishālākshi (Parvati).

At the entrance of this temple, there is a hall called 'Parivedan mandapam'. Sculptured images of Vezha mugatthu Vināyagar (Ganesha) in sitting and standing positions are kept on either side of the mandapam. To the front of the Artha mandapam, there is a 'dwaja sthambam' (Flag Staff). The Mukha mandapam is where the idols of Sarva Siddhi Vināyagar (Ganesha), Meenakshi Sundareswarar (Shiva-Parvati), Idumban, Ramalinga Swamigal (Vallalar), and Pamban Swamigal are found.

== Ramalinga Swamigal and Kandha kottam ==
The Kandha kottam temple is associated with the life of the saint Ramalinga Swamigal, who composed 'Deiva mani malai' here.

Ramalingam (1823 – 1874) was a small child when he relocated with his mother to Chennai in 1826; after the death of his father in 1824. He and his mother lived with his eldest brother Sabhapati and his wife Pāppāthi at 31/14 Veerasamy Pillai Street, Sevenwells, Chennai PIN-600 001, which is in the area near Kandha kottam temple. During visits to the temple, when the priest offered the Deepa aradhana (adoration by lighted lamp being brought close to the vigrahams), this was perceived by Rāmalingam as a deep spiritual experience. In later years he said of the experience:

"No sooner the Light was perceived, happiness prevailed on me", and

"The sweet nectar was tasted by me as soon as the Arut perun jothi (Supreme Grace Of Light) became visible".

After Rāmalingam reached five years of age, Sabhapati initiated his formal education. But the young child was not interested in that, instead he preferred trips to the nearby Kandha swāmi temple. Sabhapati thought that the child needed punishment as a form of discipline, and he told his wife not to give Rāmalingam his daily meal. His kind sister-in-law, however, secretly gave him food and persuaded him to study seriously at home. In return, Rāmalingam asked for his own room, lighted lamp and mirror. He placed the light in front of the mirror. He started meditation by concentrating on the light and thus began the young boy's spiritual life. He miraculously saw a vision of the Lord Muruga. Rāmalingam said:

"The beauty endowed divine faces six, the illustrious shoulders twelve."

At one time, Rāmalingam had to replace his elder brother Sabhapati at an upanyāsam (religious stories) session. His great discourse on verses from the `Periya purānam', an epic poem by Sekkizhar about the saintly '63 Nāyanārs', was appreciated by the devotees as being given by a very learned scholar. Rāmalingam's mental and spiritual growth progressed rapidly. Rāmalingam says thanks to the Divine by:

"Effulgent flame of grace, that lit in me intelligence, to know untaught."

Saint Rāmalingam evolved in his spiritual journey from being a devout devotee of Lord Siva to worshipping the formless.

== Festivals ==
The Kandha kottam temple has its famous yearly festivals of ādi's Kirutthigai with silver car, Aippasi's Kandha Shashti & Deivānai Thiru kalyānam, Karthigai's Deepam, Thai's Brahmotsavam, Thai Poosam, Panguni's Utthiram and the monthly festivals of Kirutthigai and Kandha Shashti. The temple has weekly 'Arut perun jothi Agaval' song on every Thursday and its daily āru jāma poojai (six times a day worship).

== See also ==
- Heritage structures in Chennai
- Religion in Chennai
