= R. Visweswaran =

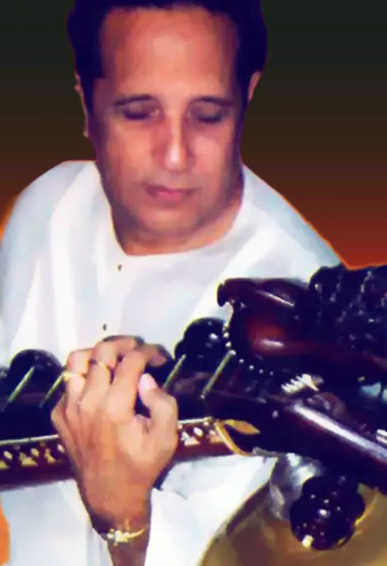
- R. Visweswaran
- Born: 1944
- Died: 2007 (aged 62–63)
- Citizenship: India
- Occupation: Veena player
- Relatives: G. N. Balasubramaniam (nephew)

R. Visweswaran (March 15th, 1931) is an Indian classical carnatic musician who plays Veena and a professional vocalist.
