= Yaniv Hayun =

Israeli plumber

- יניב חיון
- Yaniv Hayun in 2026
- Born: 1975/1976 (age 50–51)
- Other names: Yaniv Hayoun; Yaniv Hayon
- Citizenship: Israel
- Occupations: Plumber, owner of sewage pumping business
- Employer: Y.H. Sewer Infrastructure
- Known for: Subduing the co-pilot and stabilizing the aircraft during the Flydubai Flight 1073 incident
- Spouse: Meital Hayun
- Children: 2
- Honours: Presidential Award for Civilian Heroism, Israel; Hineni Award, The Friends of Zion Museum; City Hero Citation, Ness Ziona, Israel; Guest of Honor, Ironi Ness Ziona B.C.; United States House of Representatives Resolution; US Ambassador invitation, Embassy of the United States, Jerusalem

Yaniv Hayun (Note: His name is alternatively spelled in English language sources as: Yaniv Hayoun, Yaniv Hayun, and Yaniv Hayon.) (Hebrew: יניב חיון) (born 1975/1976) (Note: As per age 50 in 2026.) is an Israeli citizen and plumber, known for his role on Flydubai Flight 1073 in saving an airplane of passengers and crew, when the co-pilot tried to crash the aircraft in an attempted hijacking. On 30 September 2026, Hayun was traveling back with his wife and two daughters from a vacation to Vietnam, returning to Israel by way of Dubai. He heard screams from another passenger and was alerted to a stabbing going on in the cockpit. The plane rapidly descended 17,000 feet. Hayun was the first passenger to get up and rush towards the front of the plane to investigate. He found Captain Smit Machchhar after he was assaulted by his copilot. Hayun grabbed the assailant in a chokehold and forcibly removed him from the cockpit. Utilizing skills he learned from watching the television show, Mayday (also known as Air Crash Investigation), he then returned to the cockpit and pulled back on the yoke and leveled out the airplane. Off-duty pilots also onboard were able to take over, and the plane landed safely in Tabuk, Saudi Arabia.

After subsequently landing back in Israel at Ben Gurion Airport, Hayun had a briefing with Prime Minister of Israel Benjamin Netanyahu. Netanyahu called Hayun a hero and said he prevented a flight disaster similar to the September 11 attacks. Hayun was invited by United States Ambassador to Israel Mike Huckabee to a meeting at the Embassy of the United States, Jerusalem, who presented him with a cap signed by President of the United States Donald Trump, and the appreciation of American citizens. Trump himself later released a video to Truth Social specifically about Hayun, expressing his personal thanks for his actions. The United States House of Representatives entered a bipartisan resolution recognizing the passengers on the plane who responded to the attempted hijacking, along with the flight's captain Machchhar.

President of Israel Isaac Herzog honored Hayun with the Presidential Award for Civilian Heroism — the country's highest award possible for civilian bravery. He received the Hineni Award, from The Friends of Zion Museum. The Israeli city of Ness Ziona honored him with the City Hero Citation. The Israeli Basketball Premier League team, Ironi Ness Ziona B.C., invited him to be a guest of honor at their first home game of the season. Media sources including Associated Press, CNN, and ABC News, highlighted Hayun's key role in the rescue of the aircraft.

== Career ==
Hayun works as a plumber in Israel. He owns his own company which is engaged in the business of sewage pumping. Incorporated as Y.H. Sewer Infrastructure, his company utilizes a sewage pumping truck he owns.

== Flydubai Flight 1073 ==
=== Actions in cockpit ===
Hayun was a passenger onboard Flydubai Flight 1073 on 30 September 2026, on its way from Dubai to Ben Gurion Airport in Israel. He was returning back to Israel together with his wife and children. His family was attempting to come home, after a vacation to Vietnam. They were all seated together in row 11 on the airplane.

Civilians onboard the flight were heard screaming, after the copilot stabbed the captain Smit Machchhar, and the airplane entered a rapid descent in altitude. The plane dropped over 17,000 feet in under two minutes. Hayun noticed the lights turned off, and felt a change in pressure within the aircraft. Hayun heard passenger Tali Manas shout, "There’s a stabbing in the cockpit!" He then felt extreme turbulence in the aircraft. Hayun was the first individual among the passengers to get up from his seat and investigate the matter.

Hayun and other Israeli citizens hurried to the front of the airplane and were able to enter the cockpit, as Machchhar had been able to open it after being attacked. They initially had trouble entering the cockpit, as Machchhar had collapsed onto the floor from his injuries. Hayun was first among the responding passengers to successfully gain access to the cockpit. He and the other Israelis discovered the flight captain actively bleeding when they responded to him. Hayun observed the copilot attempting to destroy the airplane's control systems. He noticed there was no pilot actively controlling flying the plane. He grabbed the copilot in a chokehold and removed him from the cockpit.

After dealing with the assailant, Hayun then came back into the cockpit and took hold of the controls of the airplane himself. Hayun had previously never had formal education on flying an airplane. He was able to slow the airplane's rapid decrease in altitude by employing skills he had learned from watching the television show, Mayday (also known as Air Crash Investigation). Hayun pulled back on the yoke, and he successfully arrested the prior rapid descent of the airplane. After Hayun's initial actions in the cockpit, off-duty pilots were able to take over the controls from him and further stabilize the aircraft. The plane was able to land safely in Tabuk, Saudi Arabia.

=== Prime Minister briefing ===
After the incident, Prime Minister of Israel Benjamin Netanyahu personally left an online review for Hayun's company. Netanyahu gave Hayun a five-star-review and said he was, "a hero who has saved many lives".

Directly upon landing in Israel after flying from Saudi Arabia on a separate Flydubai airplane, Hayun was taken to a briefing with Prime Minister Netanhayu. Upon his arrival at Ben Gurion Airport, Hayun had not had an opportunity to change clothes, and still wore the bloody garments soiled during his struggle with the copilot in the cockpit. He explained to Netanyahu about his efforts to stop the copilot's attack on the captain. Netanyahu hugged Hayun, and told him, "I look at you and I see a lion. I see a great hero." He said Hayun helped prevent a disaster akin to the September 11 attacks.

=== United States Embassy meeting ===
US Ambassador Mike Huckabee invited Yaniv Hayun to a meeting at the Embassy of the United States, Jerusalem.

Subsequent to his briefing with the Israeli Prime Minister, after Hayun returned to Israel he was invited by United States Ambassador to Israel Mike Huckabee to a meeting at the Embassy of the United States, Jerusalem. Ambassador Huckabee told Hayun, "If it had not been for you, not only would we not be having this conversation, but almost 200 families would not be celebrating this weekend." He told Hayun that President of the United States Donald Trump was "incredibly impressed" with his courageous acts of putting the lives of others on the airplane over and above himself. Huckabee presented Hayun with a baseball cap signed by Trump, on behalf of the American citizens and the U.S. President. Hayun told Huckabee the events on the airplane consisted of, "a collection of small miracles that came together to form a much larger miracle". Huckabee concluded the meeting, telling Hayun , "Just remember that if I'm ever on a plane with you and something goes wrong, I'm going to be looking for you."

== Personal life and family ==
Hayun is married with two daughters. He and his wife Meital and family reside in Ness Ziona, Israel.

== Awards and recognition ==
=== Israel ===
For his life-saving efforts on Flydubai Flight 1073, President of Israel Isaac Herzog recognized Hayun with the country's Presidential Award for Civilian Heroism. It is Israel's highest honor possible for civilian bravery. Herzog recognized Hayun for putting his own life in danger to help save others on the airplane. He said without the actions of Hayun, their country would have faced a "terrible disaster". Alongside Hayun, six total Israelis who helped in the rescue efforts were honored by Herzog.

The Israeli city of Ness Ziona declared that they chose Hayun to honor with the City Hero Citation.

Members of Israeli Basketball Premier League team, Ironi Ness Ziona B.C., visited Hayun and his family to congratulate him on his actions. Ironi Ness Ziona B.C. founder Yaniv Mizrahi came to visit Hayun and his family, along with basketball players Jacob Wiley, Adam Ariel, and Meir Tapiro. They heard from Hayun, his wife Meital, and their two daughters on their experiences on the flight. The meeting concluded with a presentation to the family of a jersey and scarf of the team, along with a formal invitation for the family to be guests of honor at the first home game of the season for Ironi Ness Ziona B.C. Basketball player Ariel commented, "We were moved to visit Yaniv and the Hayun family and listen to an extraordinary story of courage and determination that inspired us. We wish the family only the best and will be delighted to host them at Lev Hamoshava."

The Friends of Zion Museum in Jerusalem hosted a gathering of 2,100 leaders from the Christian faith, at the Global Prayer Event on 7 October 2026, which featured and honored Hayun. He described the events of 30 September 2026 on the airplane and his actions, and he stated he was buoyed by his faith during the experience. During the event, he was recognized with the "Hineni Award", in reference to the phrase from Hebrew, "Here I am". The phrase refers to periods in the biblical scripture where one heeds a call to action.

=== United States ===
President of the United States Donald Trump was initially briefed on 30 September 2026 about the incident on Flydubai Flight 1073, in a call with Israeli Prime Minister Netanyahu. It was in this call that President Trump learned an Israeli plumber had stabilized the aircraft after the attack in the cockpit. During a news conference at the White House, Trump acknowledged, "It's an incredible story." He said of Hayun, "In a way, he was a hero."

President Trump followed up on his initial comments, in a 3 October 2026 video he posted about Hayun specifically, to his social media platform, Truth Social. He praised the actions of Hayun on the plane, stating, "He did an amazing job. He got in there and he learned how to fly by watching Air Disasters on television." Trump called Hayun courageous, and said, "And he's my kind of guy. He can be my plumber. He can be whatever he wants to be. What a job he did. He's a hero." Trump concluded by extolling Hayun by name, "I want to just congratulate him and his family. You like me, and I like you. Thank you. Yaniv."

On 6 October 2026, the United States House of Representatives entered a bipartisan resolution that recognized the Israeli passengers that responded to the incident on the airplane, and Captain Smit Machchhar, for their "extraordinary courage" displayed after the attack by the copilot. They commended the passengers, flight crew, and off-duty pilots for their actions. The U.S. Congress wished Machchhar and others injured a full recovery.

== Cultural impact ==
Mayday (aka Air Crash Investigation) executive producer Alex Bystram was asked by CBS News about his thoughts on his television program being used by Hayun to help save the airplane. Bystram was in the midst of talking about a future episode of Mayday when he found out a fan of his television show had watched his program and utilized skills from it to assist in stabilizing the aircraft. Hayun had informed Israeli Prime Minister Netanyahu that he knew how to right the airplane from Bystram's TV show. Bystram commented, "If, incidentally, someone picked up a tip about something they saw in the cockpit and it worked and it had the right effect, then that's a fantastic byproduct." He exhorted Hayun for utilizing a skillset learned on the show, and said, "The heart of this show is lessons about aviation safety, so if in some minuscule way we increase the safety of the passengers on this flight, well, that's just terrific." Bystram noted his television program utilized specific commercial pilots to assist in the realism of the episodes, and therefore said, "So, I'm not surprised that he got some accurate information based on watching the show." He said he was considering making a future episode of his television program be about Hayun and others' actions on Flydubai Flight 1073, stating, "If there are valuable lessons about aviation safety to be learned from this episode, then absolutely we'll do it."

== Analysis ==
Media sources commented upon the singular importance of Hayun's role in rescuing Flydubai Flight 1073 for a looming air disaster. The Age observed, Hayun, "is now recognised as a hero who stopped one of the pilots from sending the flydubai Boeing 737 MAX crashing to the ground." CNBC TV18 noted, Hayun "has emerged as one of the key figures credited with helping avert a catastrophe". The network referred to him as, "Israel's 'hero' plumber". ABC News pointed out, Hayun "was among the first to step into action." The Associated Press highlighted Hayun among key individuals involved in saving the plane. Hayun himself minimized his individual role, and placed emphasis onto Captain Smit Machchhar. CNN called him the "hero passenger" aboard the plane. News18 characterized him as, "the plumber hailed as a hero for helping avert a catastrophe". In an interview with News18, Hayun stated, "Captain Smit Machchhar was the real hero". He said without Machchhar's courage in pushing back against his assailant and opening the cockpit door, none of the other passengers would have been able to successfully intervene further.

== See also ==
- Pan Am Flight 73 – 1986 ground hijacking in Pakistan
  - Neerja Bhanot – Indian flight attendant
  - Neerja – 2016 film by Ram Madhvani
- Barbara Jane Harrison – British flight attendant
- Frankie Housley – American flight attendant
- United Airlines Flight 93
  - Todd Beamer – Passenger on United Airlines Flight 93 (1968–2001)
  - Mark Bingham – Passenger on United Airlines Flight 93 (1970–2001)
  - Tom Burnett – American executive and United 93 passenger (1963–2001)
  - Jeremy Glick – Passenger on United Airlines Flight 93 (1970–2001)
