= Presidential Award for Civilian Heroism =

Civil award

Presidential Award for Civilian Heroism אות נשיא המדינה לגבורה אזרחית

Awarded by the President of Israel
- Type: Civilian decoration of Israel
- Established: 2024
- Country: Israel
- Eligibility: Israeli citizens and foreign nationals
- Awarded for: "individuals who acted with exceptional heroism, mutual responsibility and self-sacrifice, to the end of saving human life."
- Status: Active
- Founder: Isaac Herzog
- Website: Official website

Precedence
- Next (higher): none
- Next (lower): Presidential Award for Volunteerism
- Related: Israeli Presidential Medal of Honour

The Presidential Award for Civilian Heroism (Hebrew: אות נשיא המדינה לגבורה אזרחית), (also known as the Presidential Medal of Civil Courage and the Presidential Medal for Civilian Heroism) (Note: The same award is alternatively translated in English language sources as: Presidential Award for Civilian Heroism, Presidential Medal of Civil Courage, and Presidential Medal for Civilian Heroism.) is an Israeli medal in the system of orders, decorations, and medals of Israel. It is the country's highest award possible for civilian bravery.

Founded by President of Israel Isaac Herzog in 2024 in the wake of the October 7 attacks, the award was created to honor civilian bravery in the face of threats to life. The president formed an awards advisory committee chaired by retired Israeli Supreme Court member Elyakim Rubinstein. The award statue itself was designed by Israeli artist Sari Srulovitch.

The first awards ceremony took place in 2024 one year after the October 7 attacks. It featured performances by Rita, Ninet Tayeb and Jimbo J. The second awards ceremony in 2025 recognized heroism during the October 7 attacks, specifically during the Hamas attack on Kibbutz Nahal Oz. A Druze-Israeli civilian who helped Jewish sports fans during the November 2024 Amsterdam riots was also honoured. In October 2026, the president honoured civilians including Yaniv Hayun who responded to the co-pilot's attack during Flydubai Flight 1073, as well as the flight's captain, Smit Machchhar.

== Criteria ==
The President of Israel described the award on the official government website as being given to recognize, "individuals who acted with exceptional heroism, mutual responsibility and self-sacrifice, to the end of saving human life." The award was intended for civilians, with other medals and state recognition given instead to members of the country's military, police agencies and security apparatus. The Presidential Award for Civilian Heroism was intended to recognize both living individuals, and could be given as a posthumous award to deceased persons as well. A sub-category of the award itself was created to recognize the heroism of children. Awards are presented to honorees at an official state ceremony by the President. The Presidential Award for Civilian Heroism is the country's highest honour to recognize civilians for bravery.

== History ==
The award was created in 2024 by President of Israel Isaac Herzog. It was established in the wake of the October 7 attacks in Israel from 2023, to honor those who showed significant bravery while at personal risk, in order to assist other individuals in danger. Herzog created an advisory board that gave nominations for awardees, with the initial chairman of the board selected as Elyakim Rubinstein, former Vice President of the Supreme Court of Israel. In addition to Rubinstein, a professional committee was established including representatives from the National Library of Israel and the research institute Yad Ben Zvi to assist in the nomination investigation process. The advisory committee to the president contained members of both Arab and Jewish ethnic backgrounds. The award was first given out to its initial recipients in October 2024. The award included a statue created by Israeli artist Sari Srulovitch, along with a commemorative plaque.

== Recipients ==
President of Israel Isaac Herzog honored Flydubai Flight 1073 flight captain Smit Machchhar and Israeli civilians at the 2026 Presidential Award for Civilian Heroism ceremony.

The first awards ceremony was held in October 2024, one year after the October 7 attacks. It included honorees who had acted at risk to their own lives to rescue other civilians during the attacks. Individuals honored included: daughters of the Suisas family, the Tassa family, Idan siblings that saw their parents killed, Dhish Ismail, Moti Ezra, Nirit Hunwald-Korenfeld, Tali Hadad, Oz Davidan, Omer Bar, and Yusef Azayadna. Posthumous award recipients included: Ben Binyamin Shimoni, brothers Ishai Slotki and Noam Slotki, physician Daniel Levy, paramedic Amit Mann, and Lion Bar. Nirit Hunwald-Korenfeld spoke on behalf of the award recipients at the presidential ceremony, recounting how herself, Amit Mann, and Daniel Levy immediately rushed to provide medical assistance to injured civilians upon hearing about the start of the attack by Hamas. Israeli singer, Rita, launched the awards ceremony with a piece sung in a low volume to relate the somber emotions of the time. The ceremony included performances by Ninet Tayeb and Jimbo J.

The second annual ceremony for the honor was held at the official residence of the president, Beit HaNassi, on 4 September 2025. Honorees included 15 total individuals, five of whom had died during the October 7 attacks. Yuval Kestelmen, an Israeli civilian who assisted in responding to members of Hamas in a 2023 incident and was accidentally killed by friendly fire, was posthumously honored at the event. Druze-Israeli, Malham As'ad, was recognized with the award for helping Jewish sports fans of association football club Maccabi Tel Aviv F.C. during the November 2024 Amsterdam riots. Tomer Eliaz-Arava, a 17-year-old civilian killed during the Nahal Oz attack, was posthumously honored with the award. Before being killed, he was taken hostage by Hamas, and forced at gunpoint to knock on neighbors' doors at Kibbutz Nahal Oz. Eliaz-Arava instead secretly warned his neighbors of the inherent danger and saved the lives of multiple households. Upon the president's announcement of the posthumous award for Eliaz-Arava, the Nahal Oz community released a statement, "As a hero, as a boy who stood face-to-face with his murderers and acted with composure." Medical response workers recognized for their efforts during the October 7 attacks, included United Hatzalah emergency medical services members Chaim Sassi and Shirel Pupkin. Organization founder Eli Beer praised the efforts of Sassi and Pupkin, and stated their actions exemplified the role of other United Hatzalah emergency workers to save lives during the October 7 attacks.

In October 2026, Herzog awarded the honour to the civilians and pilot that responded to the co-pilot's attack on Flydubai Flight 1073. These included the flight captain Smit Machchhar, along with Israeli citizens Yaniv Hayun, Tali Manes, Zvika Manes, Shota Musayev, Asaf Rajuan, and Or Pardilov. The Israeli citizens received their awards in a formal ceremony at the president's residence in Jerusalem, Beit HaNassi. The president announced the honour for Machchhar at the same time, and stated it would be formally given to him after he sufficiently recovered from his injuries on the flight. Herzog said the individuals recognized had averted a significant in-flight disaster from occurring that could have had major negative repercussions throughout the Middle East. He affirmed Machchhar's "courage and sound professionalism" in helping to prevent an airplane crash during his flight.

== See also ==
- Israeli Presidential Medal of Honour
- Orders, decorations, and medals of Israel
- List of civil awards and decorations
- List of Israeli Nobel laureates
- List of Israel Prize recipients
