= We Can Have Peace in the Holy Land =

2010 nonfiction book by Jimmy Carter

We Can Have Peace in the Holy Land: A Plan That Will Work
- Author: Jimmy Carter
- Cover artist: Michael Accordino
- Language: English
- Subject: Political Science
- Genre: Nonfiction
- Publisher: Simon & Schuster
- Publication date: February 9, 2009
- Publication place: United States
- Media type: Print (Hardback & Paperback) AudioBook (Audio CD)
- Pages: 256
- ISBN: 978-1-4391-4069-7
- OCLC: 264039129
- LC Class: DS119.76.C354
- Preceded by: Palestine: Peace Not Apartheid

We Can Have Peace In The Holy Land: A Plan That Will Work is a New York Times Best Seller book by Jimmy Carter, 39th President of the United States (1977–1981) and winner of the 2002 Nobel Peace Prize. It was published by Simon & Schuster in February 2009. It came as a follow-up to his controversial 2006 book Palestine: Peace Not Apartheid.

The book combines a brief historical overview of the conflict with accounts of Carter's personal involvement in Middle East diplomacy, and concludes with an assessment of ongoing challenges and Carter's recommendations for a lasting peace agreement.

Reviewers such as Michael Lukas praised its optimism and accessibility, while Gershom Gorenberg called it "a short op-ed article disguised as a book," endorsing its core message but criticizing its lack of depth. Others, including Michael D. Evans and Michael Rubner, accused the book of historical inaccuracies, imbalance, and selective omissions, with Rubner calling it "a disappointing book" marked by "careless words, hasty pronouncements, and sins of omission and commission."

== Background ==
Carter stated that he authored the book because President Barack Obama was "facing a major opportunity and responsibility to lead in ending conflict between Israel and its neighbors." His prior book, Palestine: Peace Not Apartheid, provoked significant debate in the United States. In 2008, he was disinvited from speaking at the Democratic National Convention, reportedly due to his outspoken criticism of Israeli policies in the West Bank and Gaza.

== Contents ==
The book opens with a brief overview of the conflict's history, covering events from biblical times to the Six-Day War in just five pages. Subsequent chapters recount Carter's personal involvement in Middle East diplomacy, including his role in the Camp David Accords. The middle sections address U.S. peace efforts under later administrations, while the final chapters reflect on Carter's 2008 initiatives, assess the contemporary regional landscape, and propose a framework for achieving a lasting Israeli-Palestinian peace.

== Reception ==
Gershom Gorenberg of The New York Times called the book "a short op-ed article disguised as a book," critiquing its anecdotal style and lack of detail but endorsing Carter's central argument for strong U.S. engagement in Middle East peace efforts.

In an op-ed for The Jerusalem Post, Michael D. Evans criticized the book, accusing Carter of historical revisionism and bias against Israel. He objected to Carter's support for involving Hamas, Hezbollah, Iran, and Syria in peace negotiations, while portraying Israeli leaders such as Menachem Begin and Benjamin Netanyahu negatively. He disputed Carter's claims that Begin agreed to divide Jerusalem or freeze settlement construction, citing personal correspondence and conversations. Evans also questioned Carter's objectivity, suggesting that donations from Gulf states to the Carter Center may have influenced his views.

Michael Lukas, writing for San Francisco Chronicle, described the book as a "balanced, deeply felt and sporadically exciting" history of the Arab-Israeli conflict focused on diplomacy since 1967. He praised Carter's pragmatic tone and use of personal diary entries but noted the book offers little new in its final peace plan and overlooks key moments like the Oslo Accords. Lukas concluded that the book's main value lies in its role as a conversation starter.

Michael Rubner of Middle East Policy described the book as a largely familiar restatement of existing peace proposals, noting that its main contribution was Carter's 2008 diplomatic mission, including a controversial meeting with Hamas leader Khaled Mashal. Rubner found Carter's peace plan to be a synthesis of earlier frameworks, such as The Clinton Parameters and the Arab Peace Initiative. He criticized the book for factual inaccuracies, uneven treatment of Israeli and Palestinian actions, and a failure to account for shifting political dynamics. He cited errors such as the misdating of Egypt's expulsion of Soviet advisers and overstating Arab recognition after the 1991 Madrid Conference, as well as overlooking Netanyahu's role in the 1998 Wye River Memorandum. He also criticized Carter's omission of Hamas rocket attacks after the 2005 Gaza withdrawal, the violence that led to Israel's security barrier, and Israeli casualties during the First Intifada, while highlighting the contrast between Carter's portrayal of Menachem Begin as a terrorist and his silence on Anwar Sadat’s militant past. Rubner wrote, "All in all, Mr. Carter has produced a disappointing book," adding that while Carter was clearly committed to peace, "the careless words, hasty pronouncements, and sins of omission and commission that abound throughout this book will continue to generate avoidable controversy."
