= Rashmi Anand =

Indian activist and writer

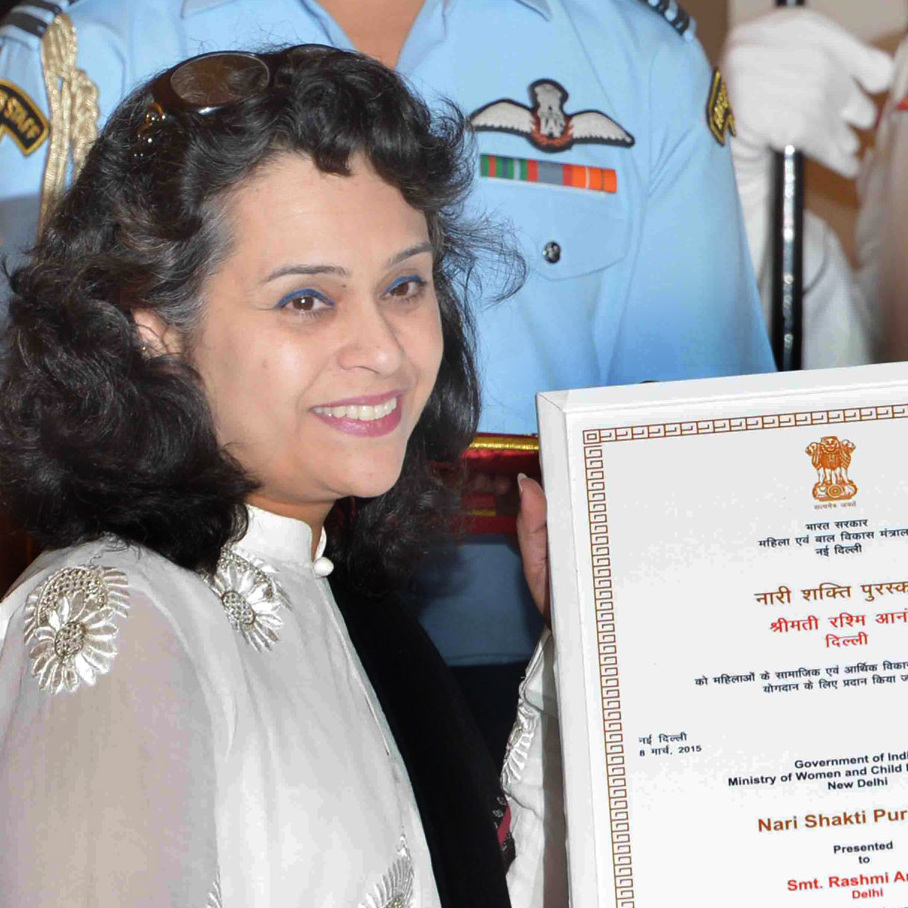
- Occupations: writer and activist
- Writing career
- Genres: prose and poetry
- Subject: domestic violence
- Notable awards: Nari Shakti Puraskar (2015).

Rashmi Anand is an Indian activist and writer concerned about domestic violence. The President of India awarded her the Nari Shakti Puraskar. This is the highest award for women in India. She founded the "Woman of the Elements Trust" which supplies support to victims of domestic abuse in Delhi.

== Life ==
Anand was brought up in Kolkata and her work took her to Delhi where her parents arranged a marriage with a successful lawyer in the city. Her parents wanted her to stick at the language despite having to go to hospital due to injuries her husband had caused.

Anand suffered physical abuse from her husband for ten years. They had two children together and when she finally decided to leave the marriage she left with her six year old child who was not speaking due to the stress. She did not press charges against her husband due to the threats that he made but she did win the custody of their children. This story was the basis of her first book.

The 2010 Delhi Police Calendar was based on her first book.

She founded the "Woman of the Elements Trust '' which supplies free legal and emotional support to victims of domestic abuse at the Crime Against Women Cell in Delhi.

In 2014 she received the Neerja Bhanot Award for her courage from Shabana Azmi for "her courage and bravery". The award is given with 150,000 rupees annually in memory of the heroic flight attendant Neerja Bhanot.

She was awarded one of the first eight Nari Shakti Awards for her leadership and achievement in 2015. The award was made on International Women's Day from the then Indian President Pranab Mukherjee.

Anand has written thirteen books. Her life story has been covered by the Indian TV show Satyamev Jayate. An issue of Chicken Soup for the Soul, includes her life story under the title "Awakening".

== Awards ==
- Nari Shakti Puraskar from the President of India in 2015
- Neerja Bhanot Award
- the Karmaveer Jyoti,
- the Karmaveer Puraskaar
- Doordarshan’s Woman Achiever Award of Aadhi Abaadi Baat Naari Ki,
- the Bharat Excellence Award,
- WeAreTheCity - Rising Star India - 2016
- the Indian Woman Achiever’s Award
- Award for Literature from the Indian Council for UN Relations.
