= Neerja Bhanot Award =

Indian annual women's award

- Description: Award honoring Indian women who overcome social injustice with grit and assist others in distress
- Country: India
- Presented by: Neerja Bhanot-Pan Am Trust

The Neerja Bhanot Award is an award of recognition conferred up to once a year by the Neerja Bhanot-Pan Am Trust in India to a woman of that country subjected to social injustice, who faces the situation with grit and determination and extends help to other women in similar distress. The annual Neerja Bhanot Award was instituted in 1990 and named in honour of Senior Flight Purser, Neerja Bhanot, who saved hundreds of lives while sacrificing her own, during the Pan Am Flight 73 hijack at Karachi Airport (Pakistan), in September 1986. It carries a cash prize of Rs 1.5 lakh, a citation and a trophy.

== Recipients ==
- 1991 - Purnima Sadhana, Sadhna Pawar
- 1992 - Satya Rani Chadha, Amrita Ahuwalia
- 1993 - Shehnaz Shaikh
- 1994 - Bhanwari Devi
- 2001 – Yasoda Ekambaram
- 2002 - Alice Garg, Flavia Agnes
- 2003 – Shivani Gupta
- 2004 – Mangala Patil
- 2008 – Chanda Asani
- 2012 – Asha Manwani
- 2014 – Rashmi Anand
- 2015 – Subhashini Vasanth
- 2016 - Sindhutai Sapkal
- 2017 - Dr. Sarojini Agrawal
- 2019 - Shifiya Haneef (Kerala)

== See also ==
- List of awards honoring women
