= Mayday (Canadian TV series) =

Canadian documentary television program

- Also known as: Air Crash Investigation; Air Emergency (National Geographic Channel, U.S.); Air Disasters (Smithsonian Channel, U.S.); Mayday: Air Disaster (Weather Channel, U.S.)
- Genre: Documentary; Docudrama
- Created by: André Barro; Bernard Vaillot
- Narrated by: Stephen Bogaert for Canada and the U.S.; Bill Ratner for the U.S. (Smithsonian Channel); Jonathan Aris for Australia, Asia, and Europe (Note: The UK broadcast of season one was hosted on Channel Five and narrated by David Bamber.); Lance Lewman for the U.S.; David Bamber (Season one narrator for Channel Five in the United Kingdom only); Michael Daingerfield for the U.S. (The Weather Channel)
- Country of origin: Canada
- Original language: English/French
- No. of seasons: 26
- No. of episodes: 287 (list of episodes)

Production
- Running time: 45 minutes
- Production company: Cineflix Productions

Original release
- Network: Discovery Channel Canada (2003–2024); USA Network Canada (2025–present)
- Release: 3 September 2003 – present

Mayday (Note: Alternatively known as Air Crash Investigation in Australia (Seven Network), New Zealand, South Africa, and the United Kingdom; Air Crash: Disaster Revealed on 5Select and some Asian and European countries; and additionally known as Air Emergency, Air Disasters, and Mayday: Air Disaster in the United States.) is a Canadian documentary television program examining air crashes, near-crashes, hijackings, bombings, and other disasters. Mayday uses re-enactments and computer-generated imagery to reconstruct the sequence of events leading up to each disaster. In addition, survivors, aviation experts, retired pilots, and crash investigators are interviewed, to explain how the emergencies came about, how they were investigated, and how they might have been prevented.

Cineflix started production of the series on 13 August 2002, with a CA$2.5 million budget. In Canada itself, the program premiered on Discovery Channel Canada on 3 September 2003 and narrated by Stephen Bogaert. Outside Canada, Cineflix also secured deals with France 5, Discovery Channel, Canal D, TVNZ, Seven Network, Holland Media Group, and National Geographic Channel to take Mayday in 144 countries and 26 languages. The series was received well by critics and nominated for a number of awards. In 2010, Sharon Zupancic won a Gemini Award for her work on the season-seven episode, "Lockerbie Disaster", that depicts the bombing of Pan Am Flight 103 in 1988. A University of New South Wales senior lecturer, Raymond Lewis, conducted a study on teaching strategy loosely based on the series. Lewis's results indicated using the strategy had "a positive effect on learning outcomes" for prospective pilots.

== Hallmarks ==
The series features re-enactments, interviews (from survivors if there are any, or from people involved in the investigation), eyewitness, CGI or computer generated imagery, and in nearly all of the episodes, voice-actor readings of cockpit voice recorder (CVR) transcripts to reconstruct the sequence of events for the audience. Several passengers and crew members (whether they survived the incident or not) are picked and actors/actresses play the roles of those passengers and crew throughout the flight, usually starting from boarding of the flight. The flight routines in the air traffic control, cockpit, and cabin are recreated on screen starting from departure up to the moment of the emergency. At the moment of the emergency, external views of the aircraft from different angles are recreated to show the effect and what had happened to the aircraft. The responses and reactions of the passengers, crews, and air traffic control personnel leading up to the eventual crash or emergency landing are then recreated. Scenes in the cockpit and air traffic control centres are recreated using the transcript obtained from the CVR of the aircraft and other recordings made at the time.

Throughout the episodes, the victims (or the relatives and friends of the victims) are interviewed, adding further information about a case as it relates to them personally. In addition, aviation experts, retired pilots, and investigators are interviewed on the evidence and explain how these emergencies came about and how they could have been prevented.

== Production and distribution ==
Cineflix started production for Mayday on 13 August 2002, with a C$2.5 million budget, after Channel Five commissioned the six-part, one-hour-each series. To keep the costs down, most of the production was kept at Cineflix's offices in Toronto. While in production, the series was sold to France 5, Discovery Channel, and Canal D. On 2 June 2003, Cineflix announced that it had sold the series to TVNZ, Seven Network, and Holland Media Group. Later that year on 22 October, a month before the airing of the first season, Cineflix announced that it had secured a major international deal with National Geographic Channel to air Mayday in 144 countries and 26 languages.

In 2011, Smithsonian Networks aired season five, renamed Air Disasters, making it the first time in the United States that Mayday had aired on a channel other than National Geographic. On 25 January 2012, Cineflix Rights announced that it would be selling seasons 8, 9, and 11 (23 episodes) to Smithsonian Networks. On 28 March 2014, Cineflix Rights announced a deal with Smithsonian Networks to air seasons three, four, and 13 (34 episodes). Air Disasters is also available on Paramount+, which also carries some Smithsonian Networks programming.

In 2020, The Weather Channel in the United States began airing several episodes of the series under the title Mayday: Air Disaster. Starting in 2021 and continuing to this day, the Wonder and On the Move YouTube channels (owned by Little Dot Studios, a subsidiary of All3Media) uploaded the first nine seasons of Mayday and the Crash of the Century special with the episodes in their full uncut versions and are available in all countries, with the exception of the United Kingdom, where they are geoblocked. In addition to Wonder and On the Move, the official Mayday YouTube channel – owned by Cineflix – has been uploading full episodes of all series, with some geoblocking restrictions depending on region. The channel has also been uploading compilations and highlights from the programme.

In the United States, the show's tenth and twelfth seasons are available for streaming online on free, advertiser-supported streaming services Tubi and Freevee under the title Mayday: Air Disasters, while the show's first season is also made available for streaming online on Amazon Prime Video, provided by MagellanTV, under the title MayDay: Air Disaster Investigations.

Most of the background aircraft that the animators would repeatedly insert into their animations are aircraft from defunct airlines such as Pacific Southwest Airlines, Hughes Airwest, TWA, Pan Am and US Airways to avoid licensing issues with the actual airlines for the background.

== Episodes ==
As of 12 January 2025, 276 episodes of Mayday have aired, not including Season 25, including five Science of Disaster specials, three Crash Scene Investigation spin-offs, which do not examine aircraft crashes, and a sub-series labelled The Accident Files that aired six seasons.

| Seasons | Episodes | Originally released | |
| Seasons | Episodes | First released | Last released |
|---|---|---|---|
| 1 | 6 | 3 September 2003 | 22 October 2003 |
| 2 | 6 | 23 January 2005 | 27 February 2005 |
| 3 | 13 | 14 September 2005 | 7 December 2005 |
| 4 | 10 | 15 April 2007 | 17 June 2007 |
| 5 | 10 | 9 April 2008 | 11 June 2008 |
| 6 | 3 | 16 December 2007 | 2 March 2008 |
| 7 | 8 | 4 November 2009 | 17 December 2009 |
| 8 | 2 | 10 June 2009 | 17 June 2009 |
| 9 | 8 | 8 September 2010 | 27 October 2010 |
| 10 | 6 | 27 February 2011 | 28 March 2011 |
| 11 | 13 | 12 August 2011 | 13 April 2012 |
| 12 | 13 | 3 August 2012 | 15 April 2013 |
| 13 | 11 | 16 December 2013 | 9 May 2014 |
| 14 | 11 | 5 January 2015 | 2 March 2015 |
| 15 | 10 | 4 January 2016 | 17 February 2016 |
| 16 | 10 | 7 June 2016 | 13 February 2017 |
| 17 | 10 | 20 February 2017 | 3 October 2017 |
| 18 | 10 | 13 February 2018 | 4 July 2018 |
| 19 | 10 | 2 January 2019 | 11 March 2019 |
| 20 | 10 | 9 January 2020 | 12 March 2020 |
| 21 | 10 | 4 April 2021 | 6 June 2021 |
| 22 | 10 | 3 January 2022 | 12 February 2022 |
| 23 | 10 | 3 January 2023 | 7 March 2023 |
| 24 | 10 | 11 February 2024 | 14 April 2024 |
| 25 | 11 | 2 February 2025 | 26 May 2025 |
| 26 | 10 | 20 January 2026 | 24 March 2026 |

| Seasons | Episodes | Originally released | |
| Seasons | Episodes | First released | Last released |
|---|---|---|---|
| 1 | 10 | 9 July 2018 | 10 September 2018 |
| 2 | 10 | 5 June 2019 | 7 August 2019 |
| 3 | 10 | 3 September 2020 | 5 November 2020 |
| 4 | 10 | 11 January 2021 | 15 March 2021 |
| 5 | 10 | 3 July 2022 | 4 September 2022 |
| 6 | 6 | 8 July 2024 | 12 August 2024 |

== Reception ==
The series has been well received by critics. Franck Tabouring from DVD Verdict said, "It's a well-produced show with plenty of compelling information about tragic accidents, telling how some people survived and others didn't."

The senior lecturer at the University of New South Wales, Raymond Lewis, conducted a study on teaching strategy loosely based on the series. The study was done with prospective pilots studying the "Aircraft Systems for Aviators" undergraduate course by including "study of air accidents and incidents associated with aircraft systems". The results of the study showed "the use of air accidents and incident scenarios had a positive effect on learning outcomes."

=== Real-world application ===
On September 30, 2026, upon returning safely from the Flydubai Flight 1073 terrorist attack, Israeli passenger Yaniv Hayun explained to Benjamin Netanyahu, "I watch Air Crash Investigation, Mr. Prime Minister," crediting the television show for his understanding of how to restabilize the unpiloted airplane from its rapid nosedive, by successfully pulling back on the yoke controller, himself.

Moments earlier in the flight, Hayun and other Israeli passengers neutralized the terrorist co-pilot who had attacked the captain with the cockpit crash axe and attempted a hijacking. Once Hayun leveled the aircraft (using his knowledge from Mayday), off-duty Flydubai pilots entered the cockpit and made an emergency landing.

Executive producer Alex Bystram learned of the show's involvement while discussing a future episode with his co-workers. Bystram remarked that it was "terrific" if someone learned from the show and applied its lessons in this real-world scenario, to increase passenger safety. When asked about a possible future episode based on the FlyDubai incident, Bystram said; "If there are valuable lessons about aviation safety to be learned from this episode, then absolutely we'll do it."

=== Awards and nominations ===
Overall, the series has been nominated for nine awards, winning two, both for film editing.

| Year | Nominated work | Recipient(s) | Category | Result |
Canadian Society of Cinematographers
| 2004 | "Flying Blind" | Michael Boland | Best Cinematography in Docudrama | Nominated |
| 2008 | "Final Approach" | Damir I Chytil | Best Cinematography in Docudrama | Nominated |
| 2008 | "Gimli Glider" | D. Gregor Hagey | Best Cinematography in Docudrama | Nominated |
| 2009 | "Air India: Explosive Evidence" | Paul Tolton | Best Cinematography in Docudrama | Nominated |
| 2009 | "Fatal Distraction" | D. Gregor Hagey | Best Cinematography in Docudrama | Nominated |
Gemini Awards
| 2009 | Mayday: Season 5 | Simon Lloyd • Larry Bambrick • Katherine Buck • Alex Bystram • Greg Lanning • Samantha Linton • Glen Salzman • John Vandervelde | Best General/Human Interest Series | Nominated |
| 2010 | "Lockerbie Disaster" | Sharon Zupancic | Best Picture Editing in a Documentary Program or Series | Won |
Canadian Screen Awards
| 2014 | "Focused on Failure" | Brian Eimer • Jessica Moniz • Josh Vamos • Matt Vandersluys • Michael Bonini • Nadia Awad | Best Sound in an Information/ Documentary or Lifestyle Program or Series | Nominated |
| 2015 | "Into the Eye of the Storm" | Dan Hawkes | Best Picture Editing in a Factual Program or Series | Won |

== Home media ==
In 2009, Entertainment One released the complete first season of the show on DVD in Region 1 in the United States.

Shock Records has released Seasons 1–18 in Australia as a 48-disc set, coded NTSC, Region 4. In 2024, Via Vision Entertainment has released Seasons 21-23 on DVD.

== See also ==
- Seconds from Disaster
- Seismic Seconds
- Blueprint for Disaster
- Black Box
- Why Planes Crash
- Terror in the Skies
