= Flydubai Flight 1073 =

2026 cockpit attack and attempted hijacking

- A6-FKF, the aircraft involved in the incident, seen in January 2026

Incident
- Date: 30 September 2026
- Summary: Suspected hijacking, terrorism, and suicide attempt; under investigation
- Site: Saudi Arabian airspace, near the Jordanian border

Aircraft
- Aircraft type: Boeing 737 MAX 8
- Operator: Flydubai
- IATA flight No.: FZ1073
- ICAO flight No.: FDB1073
- Call sign: SKYDUBAI 1073
- Registration: A6-FKF
- Flight origin: Dubai International Airport, Dubai, United Arab Emirates
- Destination: Ben Gurion Airport near Tel Aviv, Israel
- Occupants: 180
- Passengers: 172
- Crew: 8
- Fatalities: 0
- Injuries: 6+
- Survivors: 180

On 30 September 2026, Flydubai Flight 1073, while on a scheduled flight from the United Arab Emirates to Israel, made an emergency landing after one of the pilots attempted to crash the plane. The aircraft, a Boeing 737 MAX 8, was flying from Dubai International Airport to Ben Gurion Airport near Tel Aviv. Israeli and UAE officials have described the incident as an attempted terrorist attack.

According to passenger reports, the first officer, Hamam al-Hammami, attacked and seriously wounded the captain, Smit Machchhar, with the cockpit crash axe. Al-Hammami then sent the plane into a steep descent, in an apparent attempt to hijack and crash it. This caused structural damage to the aircraft's rudder due to overspeed. The captain opened the cockpit door to admit passengers, who restrained the first officer. Other Flydubai pilots deadheading on board then landed the plane at the airport in Tabuk, Saudi Arabia. Al-Hammami was taken into custody after the landing.

The incident is under investigation primarily by law enforcement agencies from Israel and the UAE. Images of former al-Qaeda leader Ayman al-Zawahiri and suicide bomber Humam Khalil Abu-Mulal al-Balawi were found on al-Hammami's social media. He reportedly planned to crash the plane into Ben Gurion Airport.

== Background ==
=== Aircraft ===
The aircraft involved in the incident was a Boeing 737 MAX 8, registered as A6-FKF. The plane entered service with Flydubai on 21 December 2022. At the time of the incident, the aircraft was approximately three years and nine months old.

=== Passengers and crew ===
There were 172 passengers, including 150 Israeli citizens, and 8 crew members onboard.

The crew included two operating pilots: an Indian captain, Smit Machchhar, who was the pilot flying, and Hamam al-Hammami, (Note: Arabic: همّام الهمّامي, romanized: Hammām al-Hammāmiyy) (Note: Not to be confused with the Saudi football player Hammam Al-Hammami) an Omani first officer who was the pilot not flying. Machchhar, age 38, trained as a pilot at Mainland Air in Dunedin, New Zealand, and flew for SpiceJet for 11 years before joining Flydubai in 2022. At the time of the incident he had logged about 9,750 hours on the Boeing 737 series, 6,400 of them as pilot-in-command. Al-Hammami was previously a co-pilot trainee with Oman Air in 2024 before joining Flydubai in February 2026 as part of a hiring spree.

The crew also included two deadheading pilots in the passenger cabin in order to operate the return flight back to Dubai: Rowan Tooth from South Africa, and Henson Steven from Fiji.

Nationality	Passengers	Crew	Total
Israel	150	0	150
Unspecified	22 (Note: Includes passengers reported with Kenyan, Australian, Russian, and Ukrainian nationality or citizenship.)	3 (Note: Second deadheading pilot, scheduled to operate the return flight to Dubai, and two cabin crew.)	25
India	0	1	1
Kenya	0	2	2
Oman	0	1	1
United Kingdom	0	1 (Note: Deadheading pilot, scheduled to operate the return flight to Dubai.)	1
Total	172	8	180

=== Middle Eastern conflict ===
Due to the ongoing conflict across the Middle East, several Western airlines reduced flights to Israel, but the airlines of the UAE continued to provide multiple flights each day between Dubai and Tel Aviv.

On 29 September, the day before Flydubai Flight 1073, Israeli prime minister Benjamin Netanyahu said he had received indications that Israel might be attacked ahead of the upcoming legislative election on 27 October. Political opponents dismissed the statement as "fearmongering". Opposition leader Yair Lapid was briefed shortly thereafter and denounced Netanyahu's warning and insisted there was no reason to panic. Lapid later stated, "Nothing even remotely resembling the [Flydubai Flight 1073] incident came up in the security briefing."

== Incident ==
Flight telemetry showing the aircraft entering a steep dive at 05:20 (UTC, which is 4 hours behind Gulf time)

Flight 1073 departed from Dubai at 7:05 a.m. GST, travelling west to Tel Aviv on a scheduled three-and-a-half-hour flight. At approximately 9:21 a.m. GST, roughly an hour before its expected arrival, the flight encountered an emergency while the aircraft was near the Saudi Arabia–Jordan border.

According to initial assessments by authorities and eyewitness accounts, the first officer, al-Hammami, attacked and seriously wounded captain Smit Machchhar with a crash axe kept in the cockpit, allegedly attempting to seize control of the aircraft and crash it. In a subsequent televised interview with Benjamin Netanyahu, Machchhar said that al-Hammami had wanted to pray. The captain turned to face forward out of respect and, approximately four or five minutes later, was struck on the back of the head.

The sound of the struggle alerted passenger Tali Manes, who was waiting for her daughter near the lavatory. She notified her husband, Tzvika Manes, seated in the front row, and one of two deadheading pilots aboard. Despite his injuries, Machchhar managed to release the cockpit door from inside, allowing others to intervene. Tzvika saw the captain fall out of the cockpit with al-Hammami "on top of him, stabbing him" as the aircraft began to dive.

During the struggle, the aircraft descended from approximately 34,000 ft (10,000 m) to 17,000 ft (5,200 m) in less than a minute, reaching an estimated speed of 600 miles per hour (970 km/h). Shortly after the initial dive, its transponder broadcast squawk code 7700, indicating a general emergency, followed by code 7500, indicating unlawful interference or hijacking.

One of the deadheading pilots, identified by passengers as "James", joined Tzvika and other passengers, including Yaniv Hayun, Shota Musayev and Asaf Rajuan, in attempting to enter the cockpit. Hayun said that access was difficult because the captain’s body was resting against the door. The group overpowered al-Hammami, who was reportedly attempting to damage or disable the flight controls, and removed him from the cockpit. According to Ynet News, Hayun said that he pulled back on the yoke to level the aircraft, using knowledge he had gained from watching the Canadian aviation documentary series Mayday. James then assumed control, and was later joined by the second deadheading pilot. Al-Hammami was initially restrained with headphone wires and later with cable ties. He reportedly shouted "Kill me, kill me" while being restrained. Musayev, a dentist, treated the injured captain.

The aircraft briefly climbed to 21,750 ft (6,600 m) before descending again to approximately 15,000 ft (4,600 m). After receiving the hijacking code and being unable to contact the aircraft for approximately 30 minutes, the Israeli Air Force scrambled fighter jets. The aircraft continued west into Jordanian airspace before turning back toward Saudi Arabia, after which the jets were recalled. According to reports, Israeli Air Force protocol permits a rogue aircraft approaching Israel to be shot down under certain conditions, with the approval of the Israeli prime minister.

After flying for approximately an hour at 15,000 ft (4,600 m), Flight 1073 landed safely at Prince Sultan bin Abdulaziz Airport in Tabuk, northwestern Saudi Arabia, at 10:45 a.m. GST (9:45 a.m. SAST). Photographs taken after landing showed that most of the aircraft’s rudder was missing; it had likely detached during the rapid descent when the aircraft exceeded its maximum design speed.

Upon landing, al-Hammami was arrested by Saudi authorities. Both injured pilots were taken to nearby hospitals. Machchhar had sustained deep cuts to his head and hands and was initially in serious condition, although his condition was later reported to be stable. Musayev later said he feared that the captain would not have survived had the landing been delayed further. One passenger was also hospitalized, and several others required bandages for minor injuries, while most passengers were physically unharmed.

== Investigation ==
Al-Hammami is an Omani national who had worked for the airline since February 2026. He was 29 years old at the time of the incident, and was born to an Omani father and Syrian mother. According to Netanyahu, "he was suicidal, that's not a question" and interrogation revealed he had undergone Islamist radical indoctrination. According to Saudi television station Al Arabiya, he was radicalized while in Syria. Under its agreement with Israel, Flydubai was obligated to exclude Omani pilots from any of its Israeli operations because Oman and Israel have no diplomatic relations. In 2024, extremist material had been found in al-Hammami's possession while he worked for Oman Air. Oman Air suspended him from piloting because he had radical ideological views, assigned him an administrative role, and enrolled him in a deradicalization program, but Oman Air did not share its concerns more broadly. Questions were raised in media outlets about how al-Hammami came to be piloting a flight to Israel.

On 1 October 2026, al-Hammami was transferred to the UAE, which launched an investigation into the incident, the motive, the weapon used, and any possible link to terrorism. Israel joined the investigation. ABC News reported that Al-Hammami was cooperating with UAE authorities, and indicated he had intended to crash the aircraft in Israel. Law enforcement agencies from Saudi Arabia and the United States are monitoring the investigation. Images of former al-Qaeda leader Ayman al-Zawahiri and triple agent suicide bomber Humam Khalil Abu-Mulal al-Balawi were discovered on al-Hammami's social media.

On 4 October, the Australian Federal Police confirmed an investigation by a counterterrorism team to determine whether al-Hammami became radicalized while on a student visa in Australia between 2015 and 2017. Also on 4 October, Channel 12 and Ynet reported that al-Hammami had intended to crash the plane into a Tel Aviv skyscraper or Ben Gurion Airport.

On 5 October, The Wall Street Journal reported that Flydubai had performed a criminal-background check on al-Hammami when he was hired in February 2026, approximately seven months before the incident, but had not contacted Omani authorities to verify his previous employment history. He had subsequently flown to Israel on multiple occasions. Al-Hammami reportedly told his interrogators that he acted in retaliation for the Gaza war and wished to die as a martyr.

On 8 October, The Wall Street Journal reported that, according to people briefed on the investigation, al-Hammami had deliberately sought employment with an airline operating flights to Israel and had considered carrying out an attack on a July 2026 flight. UAE prosecutors confirmed that al-Hammami had planned to crash the aircraft into a terminal at Ben Gurion Airport in a suicide attack, which investigators believed was inspired by the September 11 attacks.

On 10 October, The Hindu reported that the Indian National Investigation Agency had registered a case under the country's Unlawful Activities Prevention Act and Anti-Hijacking Act for further investigation of the possibility of a larger conspiracy.

== Responses and impact ==
Captain Smit Machchhar described his actions during the flight in a call with prime minister of India Narendra Modi, as he recovered in hospital in the United Arab Emirates.

In an official statement, Flydubai confirmed that an "incident" had occurred during the flight, noting that the plane landed safely in Tabuk and that all passengers were secure. A second statement cited "an altercation" on the flight deck, called the motives unknown, and said on-duty crew travelling on the flight landed the aircraft.

Saudi Arabia, which has no diplomatic relations with Israel, refused a request to allow Israeli military aircraft to retrieve Israeli passengers from Tabuk; instead, Flydubai sent two replacement aircraft to Tabuk to fly the passengers to Ben Gurion Airport.

Leaders of both Israel and India, including Israeli prime minister Benjamin Netanyahu, Israeli president Isaac Herzog, and Indian prime minister Narendra Modi, praised Captain Machchhar.

Netanyahu and Defence Minister Israel Katz held a security consultation, and Israel Defense Forces (IDF) chief of staff Eyal Zamir held a situational assessment with commander of the Israeli Air Force Omer Tischler and other senior military officials. Israeli and UAE officials called it an attempted terrorist attack, and Netanyahu said that it was too early to establish who was behind the attack.

Netanyahu announced new security measures in response to the incident. Following Israeli transport minister Miri Regev's advice, Israel suspended all Flydubai flights to the country for six days. The UAE agreed to Israel's security demands, allowing El Al, Arkia, and Israir to resume flights after being restricted by Israeli security forces for the preceding six months over unresolved security concerns stemming from the Middle Eastern conflict. The three airlines announced that they would resume service to Dubai on 2 October to bring back Israelis remaining there; El Al's landing slot was delayed until 3 October.

On the morning of 1 October, the captain and first officer were flown from Saudi Arabia to the UAE after they were medically cleared for travel. The captain continued to receive medical treatment in the UAE. The same day, US president Donald Trump threatened to hit Iran "very hard" if it was behind the thwarted attack, suggesting that the Omani first officer was linked to Tehran "based on what I'm hearing," but did not provide further details.

On 2 October, Anwar Gargash, Emirati senior adviser to UAE president Mohammed bin Zayed, became the first senior Emirati official to publicly state the incident was an "act of terrorism".

On 4 October, the Israeli government said that it does not independently vet foreign pilots, but relies on international airlines confirming that they have vetted the pilots in accordance with international standards. The same day, Netanyahu ordered "a thorough review" of security procedures for international flights to Israel.

Air France confirmed it will follow Israeli rules barring pilots from many Muslim-majority countries.

On 27 October 2026, UAE President Sheikh Mohamed bin Zayed conferred the First Class Order of Zayed II on the flydubai pilots and cabin crew involved "in recognition of their courageous efforts to ensure the safety of passengers".

=== Allegations and conspiracy theories ===
Antisemitic tropes and anti-Israel conspiracy theories began circulating online shortly after the attack, speculating that the incident was an Israeli-planned false flag operation. Monitoring of social media by the antisemitism watchdog group Combat Antisemitism Movement (CAM) and its Antisemitism Research Center (ARC) showed conspiracy theories being spread as early as 67 minutes after the airplane squawked an emergency signal (i.e., while the plane was still in the air).

CAM's four-page report stated that the conspiracy theories bore "the hallmarks of coordination" versus spontaneous reaction, and that "Iranian and Russian state media amplified" the same conspiracy narratives "within hours." Included as supporting evidence were eight screenshots of X tweets, along with figures indicating that 2,963 (approximately 72%) of the 4,136 social media posts containing the phrase "false flag" collected in the 12-hour period after the hijacking promoted conspiracy theories blaming Israel or Jews. ARC research associate Oliver Marks stated that "this isn't a narrative that forms in response to an incident ... it's part of a script that already exists, sitting ready for use whenever opportunities arise."

== Analysis ==
Richard J. Levy of Aviation Experts Consulting, a retired airline captain, said that the wounded captain sending an emergency signal and managing to unlock the cockpit door while under attack was remarkable. He also said it was astonishing that the aircraft was flyable after the rudder was ripped off.

Sally Leivesley, an aviation security expert, estimated that the plane pulled out of its rapid descent with only five seconds to spare before recovery would have been impossible.

ABC News contributor, former fighter pilot, and retired colonel Steve Ganyard said it was extraordinary that "a passenger who'd done nothing more than watch television shows,... knew how to recover the airplane and pull just hard enough to recover the airplane, but not so hard that it would do [further] damage or destroy the airplane."

Aviation security expert Philip Baum said the incident exposed a potential weakness in reinforced cockpit doors, which were designed to prevent hijackers from gaining access to the flight deck but could also hinder intervention when a pilot became the attacker. Aviation academics Steven Leib and Guido Carim Junior similarly observed that airline security procedures and crew training had traditionally focused on external threats rather than attacks originating from flight crew. They compared the incident with the deliberate crash of Germanwings Flight 9525 in 2015 and suggested that more extensive pilot screening could help address insider threats.

== In popular culture ==
After the incident a meme phenomenon spread across the internet and social media, focusing on the heroism of the Israeli passengers. David Keyes, former spokesperson to Netanyahu, shared a graphic airline seating map of Israeli seats marked with Star of David on them, and referred to the seats closest to them as premium seating options for extra flight safety precaution – a post that went viral with more than 1.5 million views. The meme kept going with other performers and users like Arsen Ostrovsky, sharing the same themed meme calling for: in case of emergency – locate the nearest Israeli. Prime Minister Netanyahu said to Fox News:"If you're next hijacked, make sure an Israeli is sitting next to you".

== See also ==
- 2026 in aviation
- Federal Express Flight 705
- List of accidents and incidents involving commercial aircraft
- List of aircraft hijackings
