= Neerja Bhanot =

Indian flight attendant

Neerja Bhanot AC
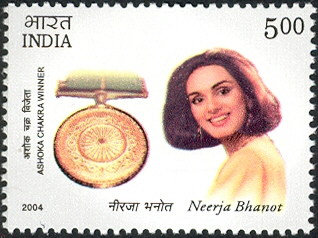
- Bhanot depicted on a 2004 Indian postage stamp
- Born: 7 September 1963; Chandigarh, India
- Died: 5 September 1986 (aged 22); Karachi, Pakistan
- Cause of death: Gunshot wound
- Other name: Neerja Mishra
- Education: St. Xavier's College, Mumbai
- Occupations: Model; Flight attendant
- Employer: Pan Am
- Known for: Saving passengers on board Pan Am Flight 73 after it was hijacked by the Abu Nidal Organization
- Spouse: Naresh Mishra (m. 1985; sep. 1985)
- Awards: Ashoka Chakra (1987); Tamgha-e-Insaniyat (1987)

Neerja Bhanot (7 September 1963 – 5 September 1986) was an Indian flight attendant. On 5 September 1986, she saved a large number of passengers aboard Pan Am Flight 73, which had been hijacked by four Palestinian militants belonging to the Abu Nidal Organization during a stopover at Karachi Airport in Pakistan. Around 17 hours into the standoff, Neerja was shot and killed by the hijackers while helping the passengers escape from the aircraft.

Posthumously, Neerja became the first female recipient, and the youngest recipient of the Ashoka Chakra — the highest peacetime gallantry award of India. She also received the Tamgha-e-Insaniyat, the fourth-highest civilian award of Pakistan, in addition to other accolades. The 2016 Indian Hindi-language biographical film Neerja, starring Sonam Kapoor, was based on Bhanot's life.

== Early life and career ==
Neerja Bhanot was born in Chandigarh, India, into a Punjabi Hindu Brahmin family. She was the daughter of Harish Bhanot, a journalist who worked for Hindustan Times, and Rama Bhanot. She had two elder brothers, Akhil and Aneesh. Her family nickname was "Lado," meaning "lovely daughter".

Neerja studied at Sacred Heart School, Chandigarh. When her family moved to Bombay, she continued her education at Bombay Scottish School. She then graduated from St. Xavier's College. At the age of 18, she was first spotted by a photographer for a modelling assignment, which marked the beginning of her modeling career.

== Career ==
Neerja continued her modeling career and appeared in advertising campaigns for brands such as Amul, Binaca, Godrej, Parle, and Vaporex. She appeared on the covers of several magazines. She applied for a flight attendant job with Pan Am in 1985. Upon selection, she went to Miami for training as a flight attendant, and became a purser. By September 1986, Bhanot had ten months' experience as a flight attendant with Pan Am.

=== Pan Am hijacking ===
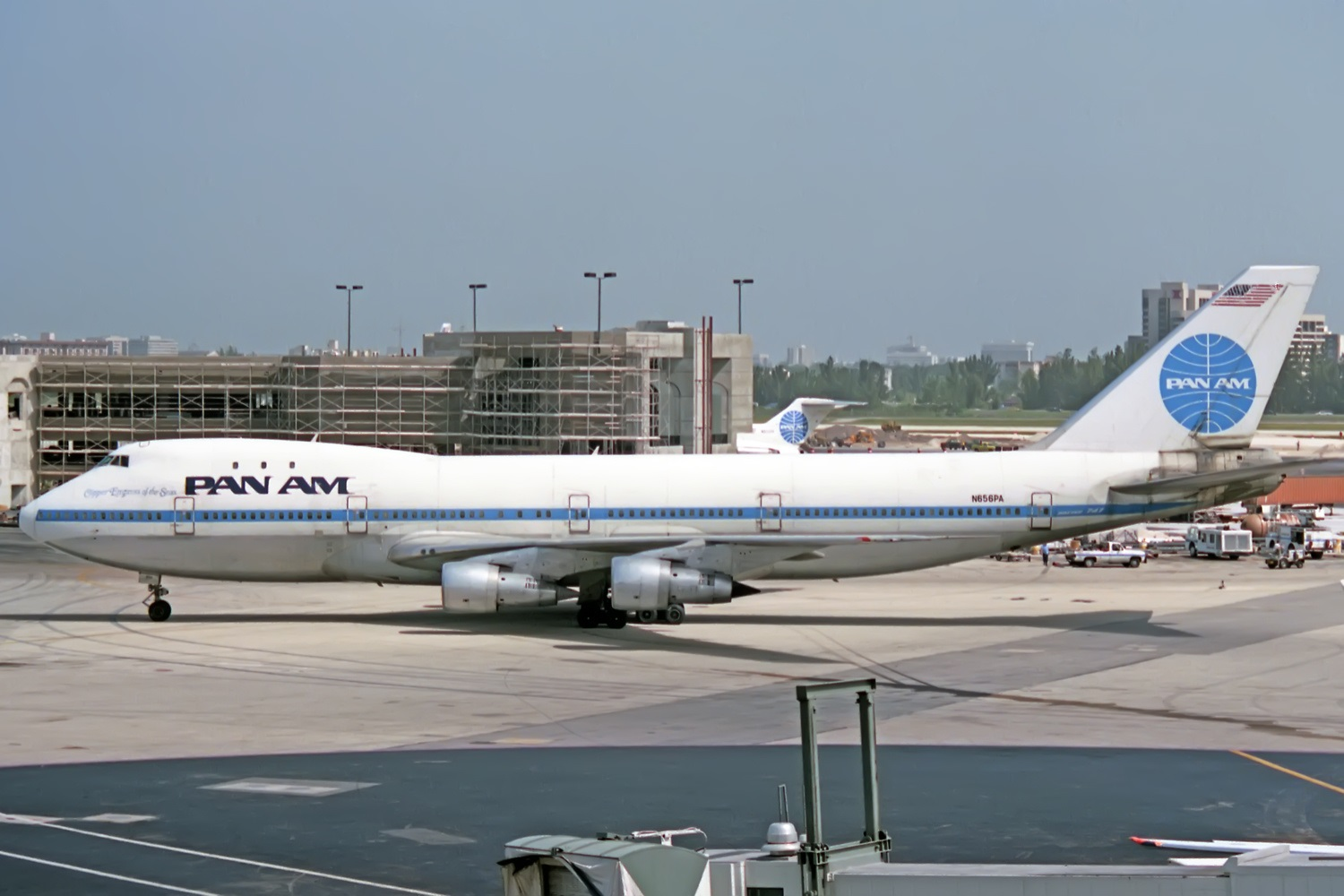
The hijacked aircraft seen at Miami International Airport in May 1983

On 5 September 1986, Neerja was the senior flight purser on Pan Am Flight 73, a Boeing 747-121 flying from Bombay to New York City via Karachi and Frankfurt. The aircraft was carrying 360 passengers and 19 crew members. The aircraft was hijacked on the apron at Karachi by four Palestinian militants affiliated with the Abu Nidal Organization, who were posing as airport security personnel. The men, armed with grenades and automatic weapons, entered the aircraft firing their weapons. The flight attendants alerted the crew in the cockpit, and the pilot, co-pilot, and flight engineer escaped from the aircraft through an overhead hatch.

Without the cockpit crew, the aircraft was grounded, foiling the hijackers' plan to fly the aircraft to Cyprus and Israel, where other members of their militant group were imprisoned. Neerja, as the head purser, took charge of the passengers and the remaining crew members. The hijackers shot an Indian-American passenger, and tried to identify American passengers, their primary targets, by examining the passengers' passports. Neerja and her crew concealed the passports under the seats and in the trash chute, preventing the hijackers from identifying the American passengers.

After a 17-hour standoff, the cabin lights went out due to a loss of power when the aircraft ran out of fuel. The hijackers opened fire inside the darkened cabin. Three exit doors had been opened by Neerja, her fellow colleagues, and the passengers, and Neerja remained on board to assist passengers in escaping. She was shot by the hijackers while shielding three children from the bullets. Eyewitness accounts later stated that she was shot at point-blank range by one of the hijackers. Neerja, who was bleeding profusely, was pushed down the emergency slide by two of her colleagues. She was helped by other crew members onto an ambulance and later succumbed to her injuries at the Jinnah Hospital.

== Personal life ==
Neerja had an arranged marriage with Naresh Mishra in March 1985, which was facilitated through an advertisement, and later joined her husband in Sharjah. Neerja returned to her parents' home in Bombay within two months to honour a modelling contract. However, the marriage subsequently broke down after her husband sent her a letter imposing several conditions to reunite with her, which Neerja and her family refused to accept. According to Neerja's family, she faced mental, physical, and financial abuse after the marriage due to demands of dowry.

After her death, her father wrote an obituary in the Hindustan Times on 5 October 1986. Her father died on 1 January 2008 in Chandigarh at the age of 86, while her mother died on 5 December 2015 at the age of 86.

== Legacy and honours ==
Her loyalties to the passengers of the aircraft in distress will forever be a lasting tribute to the finest qualities of the human spirit.

— Ashoka Chakra citation

Neerja was praised as a hero for her actions during the hijacking. The Government of India posthumously awarded her the Ashoka Chakra, India's highest peacetime gallantry award, in 1987. She was the first woman to receive the award and the youngest recipient of the award. She was awarded the Tamgha-e-Insaniyat, Pakistan's fourth-highest civilian award, by the Government of Pakistan. She was awarded the Flight Safety Foundation Heroism Award for 1987, and the Medal of Heroism from the National Society of the Sons of the American Revolution. In 2004, India Post released a commemorative stamp in her honour. In 2005, she was awarded the "Justice for Crimes Award" by the United States Attorney for the District of Columbia. In 2006, the United States Department of Justice awarded the "Special Courage Award" to Neerja and her fellow flight attendants. She was honoured by the Indian Ministry of Civil Aviation in 2011. She was awarded the "Bharat Gaurav Award" in 2016 by the Sanskriti Yuva Sanstha at a function held at the House of Commons of the British Parliament.

With the insurance money they received after her death, along with an equal contribution from Pan Am, Neerja's parents established the Neerja Bhanot Pan Am Trust with an initial corpus of ₹3.65 million (equivalent to ₹54 million or US$580,000 in 2026). The trust presents two annual awards: one to a flight crew member anywhere in the world who acts beyond the call of duty, and the Neerja Bhanot Award to an Indian woman who overcomes social injustice to help other women in distress. The award comprises ₹150,000, a trophy, and a citation. In 2017, Panjab University inaugurated the Neerja Bhanot Hostel in its Chandigarh campus. The Neerja Bhanot Chowk is a public square in Mumbai that is named after her.

== Cultural impact ==
Bhanot's brother, Aneesh, published two books inspired by his sister's life. The Neerja I Knew (2016) is a coffee table book featuring chapters written by her acquaintances. His second book, The Smile of Courage (2018), is a biography based on her life.

Neerja (2016) is an Indian Hindi-language biographical film directed by Ram Madhvani and starring Sonam Kapoor as Neerja. In her preparation and research for the film, Kapoor met with Bhanot's mother during her preparation and research for the film. During the promotion of the film, the movie studio publicly released the original audio recording of Bhanot's final in-flight announcement.

== See also ==
- Barbara Jane Harrison – British flight attendant
- Frankie Housley – American flight attendant
- United Airlines Flight 93 – Hijacked 9/11 flight; passengers fought back
  - Todd Beamer – Passenger on United Airlines Flight 93 (1968–2001)
  - Mark Bingham – Passenger on United Airlines Flight 93 (1970–2001)
  - Tom Burnett – American executive and United 93 passenger (1963–2001)
  - Jeremy Glick – Passenger on United Airlines Flight 93 (1970–2001)
- Smit Machchhar – Indian airline captain, pilot of Flydubai Flight 1073
