= Michael David Lukas =

American author

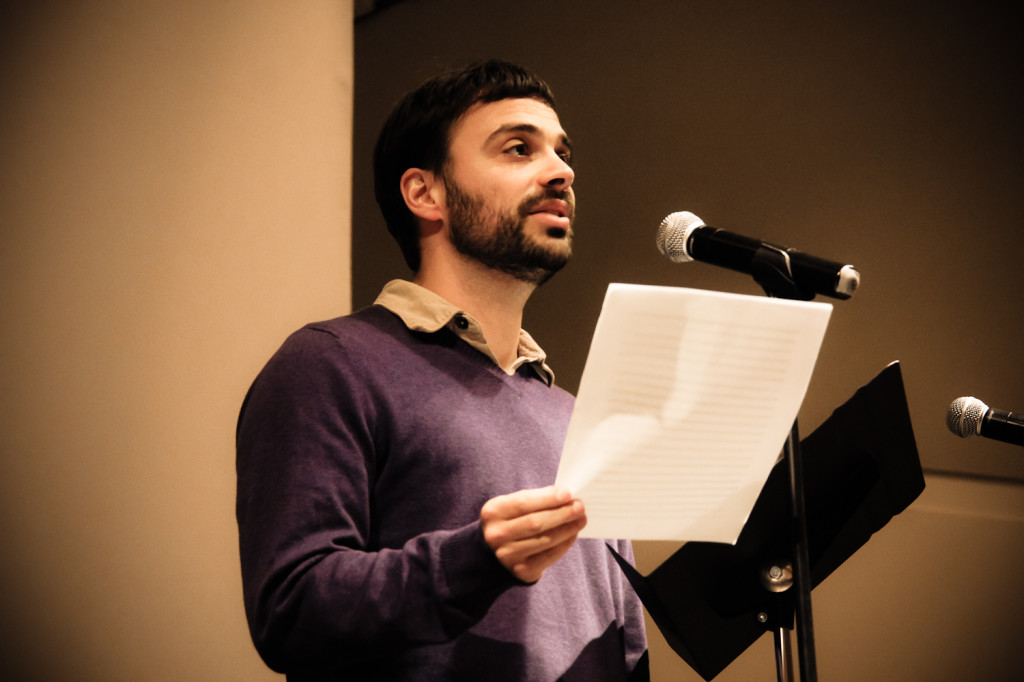
- Lukas at the Contemporary Jewish Museum in San Francisco
- Born: March 30, 1979 (age 47)
- Education: Brown University (BA; University of Maryland (MFA)

Michael David Lukas (born March 30, 1979) is an American author best known for his internationally bestselling novel, The Oracle of Stamboul, published by HarperCollins and translated into over a dozen languages. Michael's second novel, The Last Watchman of Old Cairo, was published by Random House in 2018 and received the Sami Rohr Prize as well as the National Jewish Book Award. He teaches at San Francisco State University.

His writing has been published in The New York Times, Wall Street Journal, and the San Francisco Chronicle. He has been a Fulbright Scholar in Turkey and a Rotary Ambassadorial Scholar in Tunisia. He has received fellowships from the National Endowment for the Arts, the Santa Maddalena Foundation, and the Bread Loaf Writers' Conference. Lukas has taught creative writing at 826 Valencia, The Writers' Studio at Stanford University, and the University of the Pacific.

== Personal life and education ==
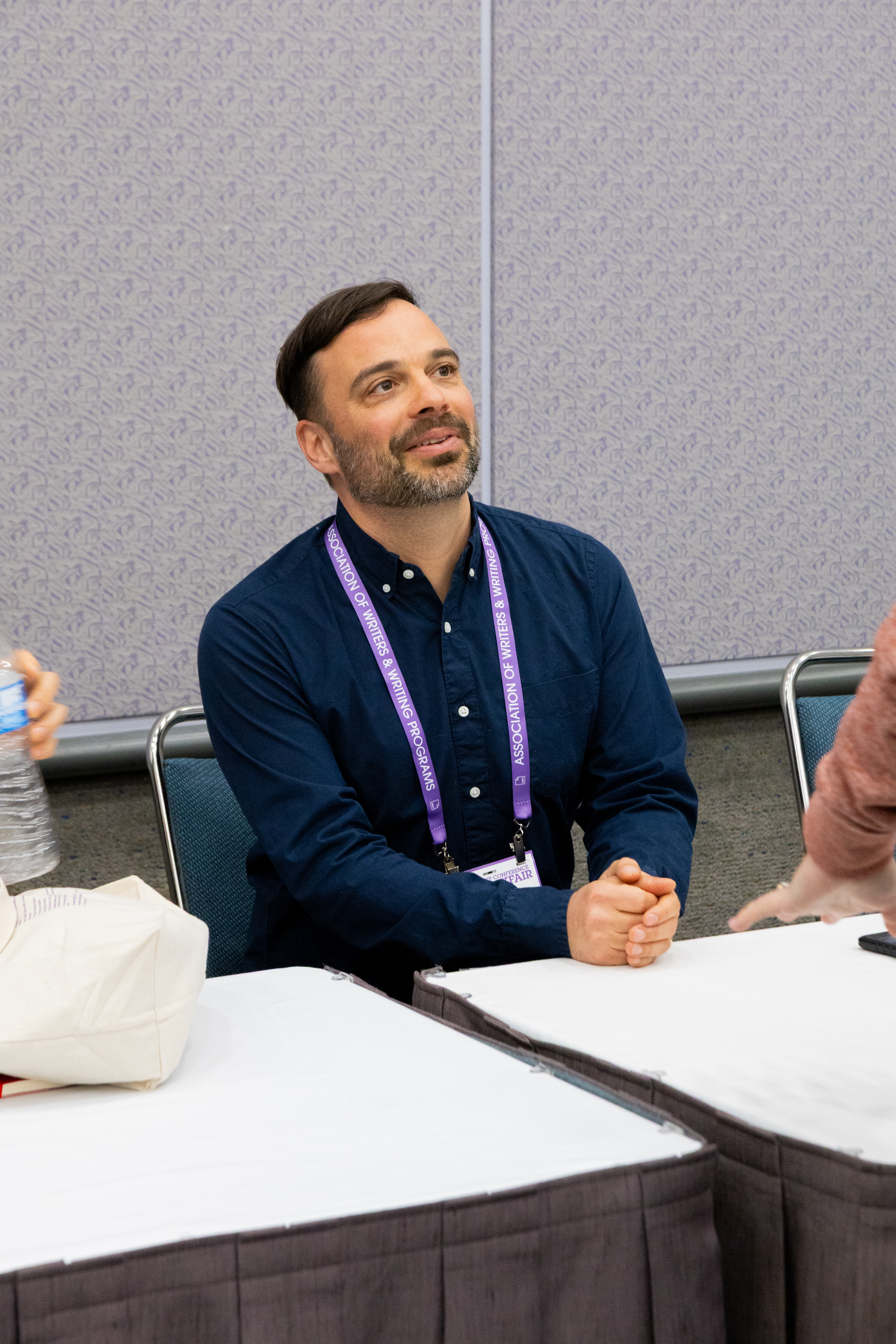
Michael David Lukas reading at the 2025 AWP Conference in Los Angeles

Lukas was born in 1979 in Berkeley, California, where he grew up with his four younger siblings.

Moving East to attend Brown University, Lukas studied comparative literature and then received a Master of Fine Arts degree from the creative writing program at the University of Maryland.

He currently lives in Oakland with his wife Haley and daughters Mona and Amira.

== Bibliography ==
Works
Title	Year	First Published
When the News and the Novel Collide	2013	The New York Times
A Multiplicity of Voices	2013	The Millions
Fear and Loving in Cairo	2012	The Wall Street Journal
Cutting It Close Makes the Trip Worthwhile	2012	The Wall Street Journal
How Should A person Be	2012	SFGate
The Queen Of America	2011	SFGate
The Arrogant Years	2011	SFGate
Sympathy For The Pharaoh	2011	Slate
Lessons From Third Grade	2011	Publishers Weekly
The Evolution of Bruno Littlemore	2011	San Francisco Chronicle
Workshopping War Literature	2010	Virginia Quarterly Review
Friendly Fire	2009	Virginia Quarterly Review
Golems, Novelists, and Other Superheroes	2009	Tikkun
How to Win a Cosmic War	2009	Virginia Quarterly Review
Destiny Disrupted	2009	San Francisco Chronicle
A Skeptic’s Guide to Passover	2009	Slate
Passover Miracles Meet Scientific Explanations	2009	All Things Considered
We Can Have Peace in the Holy Land	2009	San Francisco Chronicle
Mitzvah Mobile	2008	Slate
Al’ America	2008	San Francisco Chronicle
Question and Answer Men	2003	Brown Alumni Magazine
From A to X	2008	San Francisco Chronicle
Finding Nouf	2008	San Francisco Chronicle
Mirror of the Arab World	2008	San Francisco Chronicle
The Uncertain Hour	2007	San Francisco Chronicle
Forget The Quran	2006	Slate
Culinary Orientalism	2007	The New York Times Magazine
Tortilla Dreams	2006	Diablo Magazine
Israel Vibration	2005	Washington City Paper
Tourist Class	2005	Washington City Paper
The Commercial Campus	2003	Providence Phoenix
My Summer Job	2003	Brown Alumni Magazine
My Daddy's War Story		In Posse Review
For True Bookies, a Wealth of Riches	2002	The Boston Globe
A Writer’s Life	2002	Brown Alumni Magazine

== Awards ==
- 2018: National Jewish Book Award for The Last Watchman of Old Cairo
- 2019: ALA's Sophie Brody Medal for The Last Watchman of Old Cairo
- 2019: Sami Rohr Prize for The Last Watchman of Old Cairo
