= The Friends of Zion Museum =

Museum in Jerusalem

- מוזיאון ידידי ישראל
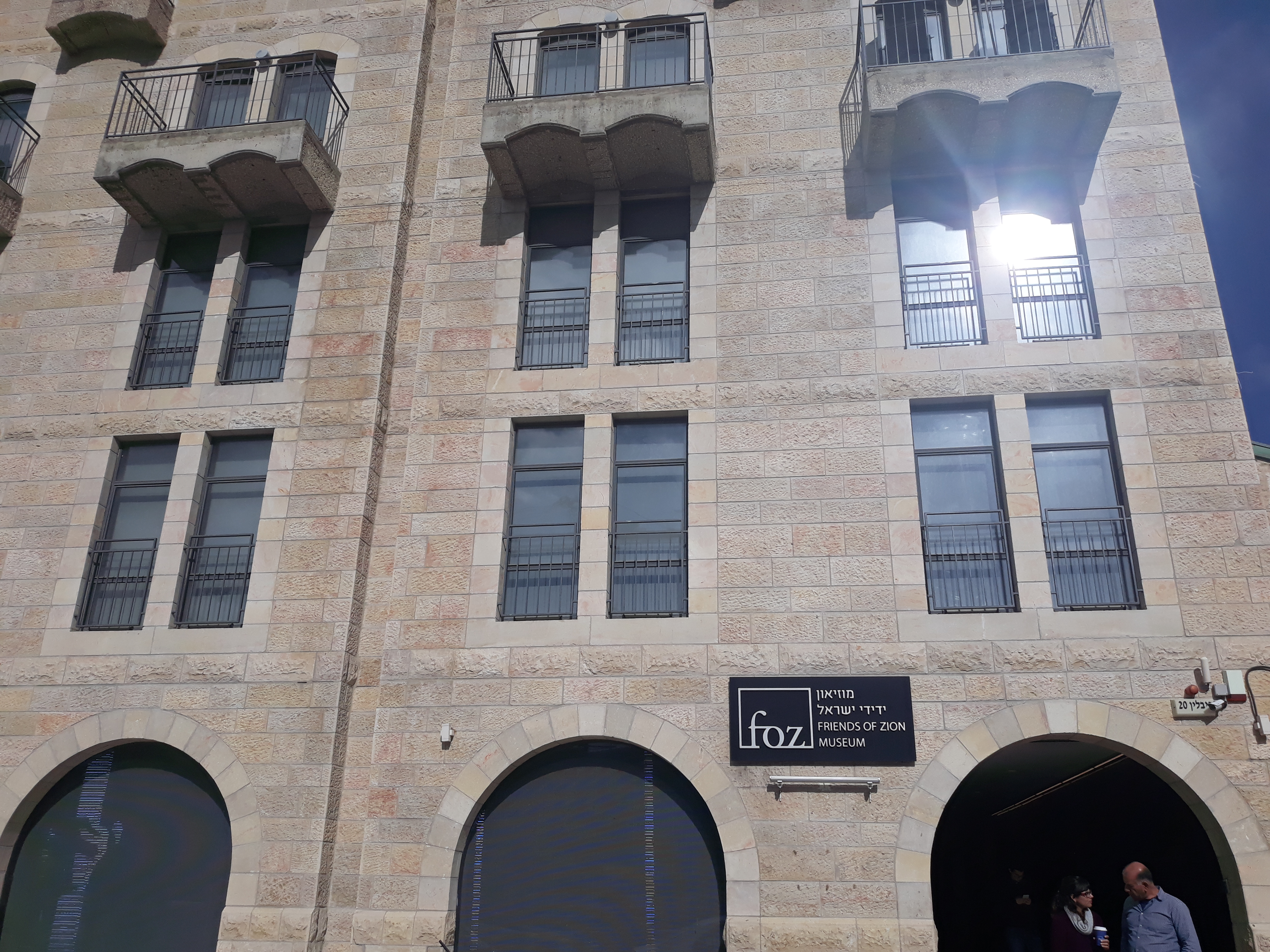
- Established: April 2015
- Coordinates: 31°46′48.6″N 35°13′13.1″E

The Friends of Zion Museum (Hebrew: מוזיאון ידידי ישראל) is a museum in the historic Nahalat Shiv'a neighborhood of downtown Jerusalem. The museum celebrates Christian Zionists and their contribution to Israel. It is also the site of the Indigenous People Embassy in Jerusalem.

== History ==
The museum tells the story of non-Jewish aid to the Jewish people, support of Zionism and assistance in the establishment of the State of Israel. Each of the four floors exhibits different periods in Jewish history, including the 19th century, the British Mandate for Palestine, the Holocaust and the establishment of Israel.

The museum features seven exhibitions, combining 3D technology, touch screens, an original musical score and surround sound. All the work in the museum is local, by over 150 Israeli artists.

The museum opened in April 2015. The museum's international audience is assisted by presentations in 16 different languages.

The founder of the museum is Mike Evans, an American Christian evangelist. Evans has written close to 70 books, many of them about Zionism. The museum is financed by donors from all over the world. The first International chairman of the museum was the Israel's 9th president the late Shimon Peres. General Yossi Peled is head of the board of governors, whose members include former IDF chief of staff, lieutenant general Dan Halutz, Kobi Oshrat, Professor Yaakov Ne'eman and others.

The Education Corps of the Israel Defense Forces sends soldiers to the museum to learn about the role of Christian Zionists in the 19th and 20th centuries advocating for the creation of a Jewish State.

== Exhibits ==
The main exhibit is "Here am I", and it features seven exhibits that run through different periods in history, starting at the biblical time and up until the establishment of the State of Israel. Every exhibit introduces different characters that have supported the Jews and Zionism, and helped establish the state.

The museum exhibits present the contribution of the Friends of Zion such as President of the United States Harry Truman, Prime Minister of Britain Winston Churchill, Orde Wingate and several Righteous Among the Nations such as Oskar Schindler. Raul Wallenberg and the Ten-Boom family that have saved lives during the Holocaust while risking their own lives.

== Museum awards ==
The museum awards every year the Friends of Zion award to those who have stood by the Jewish nation and supported it. The recipients by year:

- 2015 – Former U.S. president, George W. Bush.
- 2016 – Prince of Monaco, Albert II.
- 2017 – Former president of Bulgaria, Rosen Plevneliev.
- 2018 – Donald Trump, President of the U.S.
- 2019 – Juan Orlando Hernández, President of Honduras
- 2020 – King Hamad bin Isa Al Khalifa of Bahrain, King Mohammed VI of Morocco, Prime Minister Sheikh Mohammed bin Rashid Al Maktoum of the United Arab Emirates (UAE), Crown Prince Mohammed bin Salman bin AbdulAziz Al Saud of Saudi Arabia, Sultan Haitham bin Tariq of Oman, President Aleksandar Vučić of Serbia, President Klaus Iohannis of Romania, President Mario Abdo Benítez of Paraguay, President Miloš Zeman of Czech Republic, President Yoweri Museveni of Uganda, President Lazarus Chakwera of Malawi.
- 2022 - Milorad Dodik, Serb member of the Presidency of Bosnia and Herzegovina
- 2023 - President George M. Weah of Liberia
- 2024 - Brasil Paralelo, Brazilian media company.
- 2026 -Abdirahman Mohamed Abdullahi, president of Somaliland

In addition, in the year 2016 the founder of the museum Mike Evans released together with Pope Francis a joint statement condemning violence.

== Indigenous People Embassy ==
In 1999, Chief Lynda Prince, of the Nak'azdli Band in British Columbia, Canada proposed the establishment of an embassy for Indigenous peoples in Jerusalem, in a speech to the Knesset.

In 2024, the Indigenous Coalition For Israel initiated the creation of what it called the "first-ever Indigenous People Embassy in Jerusalem", located on the Friends of Zion Museum campus. This project, recognized by the Israeli Foreign Ministry as the 100th embassy in the State of Israel, aims to modify the narrative among indigenous peoples worldwide, emphasizing the ancestral connections indigenous groups have to their lands and resources. It seeks to acknowledge the social and cultural distinctions that define indigenous populations across the globe.

The project's participants are largely unified by Christian beliefs in the Biblical importance of Israel, and some acknowledge that their pro-Israel positions do not reflect the majority opinions of their indigenous communities back home. However, the group's membership is open to people of all religions.

The Jerusalem Post reported that the establishment of the embassy received support from unspecified indigenous leaders, including "several tribal chiefs, a princess, and a king", from various parts of the world including Singapore, Taiwan, Samoa, American Samoa, Hawaii, Tahiti, New Caledonia, Solomon Islands, Australia, Papua New Guinea, Cook Islands, Tonga, Fiji, North America, and South Africa. Jerusalem Deputy Mayor Fleur Hassan-Nahoum stated that indigenous peoples, with their intrinsic connections to their territories, are well-positioned to counter narratives that aim to disconnect the Jewish people from their ancestral lands.
