= Smit Machchhar =

Indian airline captain

- Machchhar on a call with Prime Minister Narendra Modi from hospital
- Born: 1987/1988 (age 38–39); Rajkot district, Gujarat, India
- Education: Welingkar Institute of Management Development and Research; Mainland Air Flight School
- Occupation: Commercial pilot
- Years active: 2008–present
- Known for: Captain of Flydubai Flight FZ1073
- Spouse: Sonal Machchhar
- Children: 2
- Honours: First-Class Order of Zayed II, United Arab Emirates; Presidential Award for Civilian Heroism, President of Israel; United States House of Representatives Resolution; Vishisht Gujarat Garima Award, Government of Gujarat; More, at: Awards and honours

Smit Machchhar (born 1987/1988 (Note: As per age 38 in 2026.)) is an Indian commercial pilot who, whilst working as the captain of Flydubai Flight 1073, was attacked in the cockpit by first officer Hamam al-Hammami, who attempted to hijack the aircraft. Machchhar received life-threatening injuries in the attack but managed to open the cockpit door from the inside, allowing crew and passengers to intervene and subdue the attacker. The aeroplane made an emergency landing in Tabuk, Saudi Arabia, with no fatalities. After sustaining trauma in the attack, he was treated at a hospital in Saudi Arabia and then flown by air medical services to a hospital in the United Arab Emirates.

Before joining Flydubai, Machchhar worked at SpiceJet for 11 years and gained experience flying Boeing 737 aircraft.

For his actions on Flight 1073, the President of the United Arab Emirates awarded Machchhar with the First-Class Order of Zayed II. The President of Israel honoured Machchhar with the country's highest recognition for civilian bravery, the Presidential Award for Civilian Heroism. The Government of Gujarat recognised Machchhar with the Vishisht Gujarat Garima Award. The Harmony Foundation awarded him the Mother Teresa Award, and the United States House of Representatives introduced a bipartisan resolution honouring Machchhar for his actions.

== Early life and education ==
Machchhar was born in the Rajkot district of Gujarat and grew up in Mumbai, Maharashtra after moving there with his family. As a child, he assumed he would join the family's textile business, and he completed a course in textile engineering. He went on to study management at Welingkar Institute of Management Development and Research in Mumbai.

When he was 19 years old, Machchhar attended a seminar on the airline industry, leading to a desire to work in that industry. In 2008, Machchhar spent 18 months in Dunedin, New Zealand for flight training at Mainland Air at Dunedin Airport. According to fellow trainee, Dhaval Patel, Machchhar was helpful to his peers and taught others "with so much clarity and knowledge". According to his instructor, Philip Kean, Machchhar was "a leading type student, out in front" whilst at Mainland Air. After completing his training, Machchhar returned to India to work as a commercial pilot.

== Career ==
A6-FKF, the aircraft piloted by Machchhar for Flydubai, photographed in January 2026

Machchhar began his flying career at the Indian airline SpiceJet. He rose to the rank of senior commander and later became a line training captain. He was hired by Flydubai in 2022. In a 2025 podcast interview, he said he had flown Boeing aircraft for his entire career. By September 2026, he had logged more than 9,750 hours with Boeing 737 aircraft. Noteworthy experiences included a difficult landing in Greece, piloting through monsoon turbulence, and an emergency landing for an in-flight childbirth.

Machchhar is also an instructor for Fly By Aviation, a private flight school.

== Flydubai Flight 1073 ==
=== During the incident ===
Flight telemetry showing aircraft entering a steep dive at 05:20 (UTC; Gulf time is 4 hours ahead)

On 30 September 2026, Machchhar was the captain of Flydubai Flight 1073, a Boeing 737 MAX 8 aircraft flying from Dubai International Airport to Ben Gurion Airport, Tel Aviv. The flight was carrying 172 passengers and 8 crew members. (Note: An official statement from the CEO of Flydubai confirmed that there were 172 passengers, and that the 2 pilots who landed the plane were members of the crew. Other sources confirm there were 180 people on the aeroplane.)

The incident occurred roughly two and a half hours into the flight, when the aeroplane descended approximately 17,000 ft (5,200 m) in less than two minutes. According to Machchhar, al-Hammami said he wanted to pray. Machchhar faced forward out of respect, and was struck on the head approximately five minutes later. According to investigators and eyewitness accounts, al-Hammami, in an attempt to hijack the aircraft, attacked Machchhar with a crash axe kept in the cockpit. The co-pilot wanted to deliberately crash the aeroplane. Although seriously injured, Machchhar opened the cockpit door, allowing crew and passengers to subdue the co-pilot. Passengers further stopped the plane's rapid descent.

By the time he was able to open the cockpit door, Machchhar had lost a great deal of blood and collapsed. Passenger Shota Musayev, a dentist, helped with treatment of his injuries. Musayev stated Machchhar told him he had two children and did not want to die. He underwent significant haemorrhaging, according to Musayev, who was unsure they would land in time to save his life. Machchhar told India's Prime Minister, Narendra Modi, he recited the Hindu devotional hymn Hanuman Chalisa after being attacked.

Two relief pilots onboard were able to reach the cockpit and stabilise the aircraft, which made an emergency landing at Prince Sultan bin Abdulaziz Airport in Tabuk, Saudi Arabia.

=== Aftermath ===
Both Machchhar and al-Hammami were taken to a hospital. Machchhar, who had sustained a depressed skull fracture in the attack, underwent surgery and his condition was stabilised.

After his medical treatment in Dubai, Saudi Arabia, he was taken by air medical services to Abu Dhabi, United Arab Emirates, for further treatment. His family flew from India to be with him. He continued to recover at the Dubai hospital, and he was able to walk ten steps while in hospital. The Indian Embassy in the UAE was coordinating his medical care with the local government. Two GoFundMe fundraisers were set up to support Machchhar's family and pay his medical expenses. The day after the incident, the campaigns had raised US$80,000.

The Prime Minister of Israel, Benjamin Netanyahu, called Machchhar a courageous saviour and said he saved the lives of 174 people. This praise was echoed by the Indian embassy in Saudi Arabia.

The Prime Minister of India, Narendra Modi, personally contacted Machchhar's wife and parents. Modi told the family he was keeping Machchhar's health and safe recovery in his prayers. Modi stated, whilst sustaining serious injuries and the ongoing threat to his life, Machchhar displayed bravery whilst concerned for the lives of his passengers. Modi noted Machchhar averted hundreds of deaths and prevented a disaster, and said the pilot had displayed calm and collected actions under pressure. He stated Machchhar's actions averted a disaster similar to the September 11 attacks from being carried out on his aeroplane. Speaking for the people of India, Modi said he felt Machchhar's courage inspired the Indian people with honour.

During his recovery, the Indian counter-terrorism body, the National Investigation Agency, opened a formal investigation into his injuries and the incident.

=== Dignitary outreach ===
Prime Minister of India Narendra Modi publicly released video of a phone call reach out to Smit Machchhar as he recovered in hospital in the United Arab Emirates.

Whilst in hospital in the UAE, Machchhar received a telephone call from Indian Prime Minister, Narendra Modi. Machchhar was heartened by the call, telling Modi he felt pride the Prime Minister had contacted him, and said he regarded Modi as his role model. Machchhar explained to Modi he had been fighting to survive in the cockpit of his airplane. The Prime Minister's office publicly released video of the telephone interaction on 2 October 2026.

Machchhar said he struggled to get help and open the cockpit door whilst he was being attacked. He told Modi that he was motivated both to save his own life, and the lives of everyone on board his aircraft. He said his 17 years of flying experience helped him act in the emergency situation. Machchhar stated he felt a duty to respond but he collapsed due to his injuries and could sense the aircraft was rapidly descending. He told Modi he had difficulty summoning the energy to open the cockpit door to request help, and was still under assault whilst trying to open it. Modi also spoke to Machchhar in Gujarati, in addition to Hindi, as both men were born in Gujarat, West India. Modi told Machchhar his example illustrates the importance of saving lives to the Indian people.

Crown Prince of Dubai, Hamdan bin Mohammed Al Maktoum, visited Machchhar while in hospital in the UAE. He said he represented the governmental leadership of the country in praising Machchhar for his actions. The Crown Prince stated he felt pride at having Machchhar serving as a pilot in his country. He said Machchhar represented the values of the UAE in emphasising humanity, peace and kindness.

On 3 October 2026, Machchhar received a call from Israeli Prime Minister, Benjamin Netanyahu. He told Netanyahu new information about the attack. He said two hours into the flight, Hamam al-Hammami had got up to pray, which Machchhar regarded as a routine activity. Machchhar then felt himself being struck in the back of the head, and began to lose his vision. He said his flight attendants were trying to input the door code to enter the cockpit during the assault, but al-Hammami was not allowing them to gain access.

Indian Ambassador to the United Arab Emirates, Deepak Mittal, released a statement saying the Bochasanwasi Akshar Purushottam Swaminarayan Sanstha (BAPS), a Hindu denomination within the Swaminarayan Sampradaya, held a special prayer session for Machchhar's healing and recovery. The group consisted of Indian devotees and swamis who were living in Abu Dhabi. Mittal said Machchhar was recovering well and thanked the community for their support. He said the Indian Embassy in Dubai was monitoring Machchhar's situation and relaying support to his family. Mittal met with Machchhar whilst Machchhar was in hospital in Dubai. He was receiving specialised medical care in the UAE in coordination with the Government of India.

== Personal life and family ==
Machchhar lives in Dubai with his spouse Sonal Machchhar and their two children. They moved to Dubai for his role with Flydubai. His family and friends call him by the nickname "Smit Mac".

== International recognition ==
=== India ===
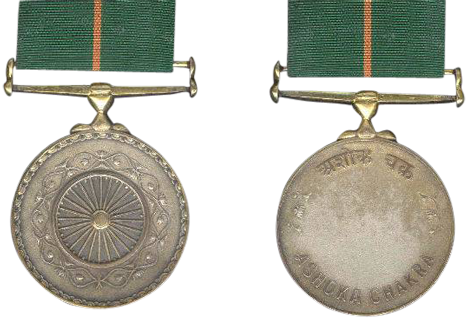
Ashoka Chakra Award medal

Ashoka Chakra Award ribbon

Members of Parliament in India, Vikramjit Singh Sahney, Milind Deora, and Kartikeya Sharma, each called for Machchhar to receive India's highest award for peacetime gallantry — the Ashoka Chakra Award.

For his heroism on Flydubai Flight 1073, Machchhar was awarded the Vishisht Gujarat Garima Award by the Government of Gujarat. The award was announced by Chief Minister of Gujarat Bhupendrabhai Patel. Patel said the award recognised his bravery and calm demeanour in an emergency.

The Federation of Indian Pilots (FIP) wrote to Prime Minister of India, Narendra Modi, on 2 October 2026, requesting Machchhar be given a National Bravery Award due to Machchhar's high level of bravery and professional demeanour. C. S. Randhawa, president of the FIP, asked Modi to investigate the attack against Machchhar, review operations documents and his healthcare reports, and then determine the type of award to be given.

Indian Member of Parliament (MP) Rajya Sabha and Sun Foundation chairman Vikramjit Singh Sahney, publicised an award to Machchhar on 3 October 2026. Sahney declared a "Smit Machchhar Bravery Award" for Machchhar's courageous actions while under threat to his life during the attack. The award came with ₹25 lakh (US$25883.4). Sahney said the monetary portion of the award would use Machchhar's name to help young pilots to receive scholarships for flight-training school.

Separately from the bravery award, Sahney wrote a letter to Modi asking for Machchhar be given India's highest award for peacetime gallantry, the Ashoka Chakra Award. This call was echoed by MP in the Rajya Sabha from Maharashtra, Milind Deora. Deora wrote a separate letter to the Prime Minister's office requesting Machchhar get the Ashoka Chakra recognition. Deora told Modi Machchhar should get the award because his actions exemplify the values of selflessness and bravery.

MP Kartikeya Sharma, a member of the upper house of the Indian Parliament from Haryana, echoed the calls to grant Machchhar the Ashoka Chakra Award. Sharma wrote an open letter to Prime Minister Modi and issued a press release calling on the Indian government to grant Machchhar the award. He said Machchhar was seriously injured in the line of duty while carrying out his functions as a pilot, and displayed admirable bravery.

The student organisation Akhil Bharatiya Vidyarthi Parishad (ABVP) echoed the politicians' requests for Machchhar to receive the Ashoka Chakra Award. The District Bar Association of Gurugram wrote to their local government requesting Machchhar be granted the Ashoka Chakra Award. The Tehsildar officer for Gurugram formally received the letter and forwarded it along to the Prime Minister's office. G. D. Bakshi, retired Major General SM VSM of the Indian Army, called on his government to give Machchhar the Ashoka Chakra Award. Bakshi said Machchhar had the "stuff of which heroes are made".

Abraham Mathai, founder of the non-governmental organisation Harmony Foundation in Mumbai, nominated Machchhar for its Mother Teresa Award. The organisation said it would to give Machchhar its Mother Teresa Memorial Award for Social Justice because his courage gave pride to Indian people and the world. Mathai said Machchhar's actions exemplify the values of compassion and selflessness of Mother Teresa.

Mankind Pharma, a Delhi-based Indian multinational pharmaceutical and healthcare product company, announced an award to Machchhar and his family for preventing a disaster, of ₹1 crore (US$103533.6). The company's vice chairman, Rajeev Juneja, wrote an open letter to Machchhar in which he said he felt a high degree of honour watching Machchhar display bravery before the world.

B. S. Yediyurappa, a former Chief Minister of Karnataka, stated he would campaign for Machchhar to receive the Bharat Ratna, the highest civilian award of the Republic of India. He convened a press conference in Kalaburagi and called on the President of India, Droupadi Murmu, and the Prime Minister of India to grant Machchhar the award. He said Machchhar's admirable deeds during the incident had caused worldwide positive recognition for himself and his country.

On 7 October 2026, Prime Minister Modi gave a speech to commemorate his 25 years of public service. He praised the positive reputation Machchhar's actions brought to his country. Modi commented: "Today, India's pilot is discussed across the world".

=== United States ===
United States House of Representatives Resolution

United States Congress publication, the Congressional Record

Members of the United States Congress honoured Machchhar, through entering a U.S. House Resolution, and a submission to the Congressional Record.

In the Oval Office at the White House on the day after the incident, President of the United States Donald Trump was asked about his thoughts on Machchhar. Trump stated he thought Machchhar was a "hero", and noted Machchhar was able to take action even though "the pilot was in very bad shape" after being attacked by his co-pilot.

On 6 October 2026, the United States House of Representatives entered a bipartisan resolution that recognised Machchhar for his "extraordinary courage" displayed during the attack. They commended the passengers, flight crew, and off-duty pilots for their actions. The U.S. Congress wished Machchhar and others injured a full recovery.

On 9 October 2026, US Congressman Raja Krishnamoorthi honoured Machchhar with a submission in the United States Congress publication Congressional Record. Krishnamoorthi's piece was titled "Recognizing Captain Smit Machchhar for His Bravery and Lifesaving Actions on Flydubai Flight 1073". Krishnamoorthi concluded: "I ask my colleagues to join me in honouring Captain Smit Machchhar, whose extraordinary courage helped save hundreds of lives aboard Flight 1073. We extend our warmest wishes to him, his wife Sonal, their two children, and their entire family, and we hope for the captain’s full-speed recovery from his injuries at the earliest."

Jewish and Indian community leaders assembled at an adult daycare centre in Iselin, New Jersey, on 9 October 2026 to honour Machchhar. The keynote speech was delivered by Consulate General of India in New York, Tsewang Gyaltson. Nimish Patel of the Iselin Center and Nitin Vyas accepted the "Edison Mayor's Heroic Certificate" on behalf of Machchhar.

A separate event honoring Machchhar was held in New Jersey by the groups Unity for Cause and the Federation of Indo-American Seniors Association of North America (FISANA). The event, held at the Royal Albert Palace, included 500 attendees from religious, political and lay leadership of local Indian and Jewish communities. Guest speakers at the event included Edison, New Jersey city councilor Asaf Shmuel, Marlboro, New Jersey deputy mayor Juned Qazi, Edison Democratic Council president Joseph Coyle, Woodbridge councilman Viru Patel, Tsewang Gyaltson of the Indian Consulate, and Parsippany–Troy Hills, New Jersey mayor Pulkit Desai.

=== United Arab Emirates ===
Ribbon bar of the United Arab Emirates honour, First-Class Order of Zayed II, received by captain Machchhar.

The General Civil Aviation Authority of the United Arab Emirates issued a commendation to Machchhar, his flight crew and the passengers who responded to the incident. On 27 October 2026, the UAE government recognised Machchhar with the First-Class Order of Zayed II, a rare civilian award. The award was conferred by President of the United Arab Emirates Mohamed bin Zayed Al Nahyan.

=== Israel ===
President of Israel Isaac Herzog honored Flydubai Flight 1073 flight captain Smit Machchhar and Israeli civilians at the 2026 Presidential Award for Civilian Heroism ceremony.

Israeli Ambassador to India, Reuven Azar, stated his country would honour Machchhar for his actions saving the lives of those onboard his aircraft. Azar praised the pilot's courage under an emergency situation. He said Machchhar's bravery had moved the people of Israel, and that the nation's government officials perceived his bravery under crisis.

Prime Minister of Israel Benjamin Netanyahu extended an invitation on 4 October 2026 to Machchhar and Indian Prime Minister Modi to become ceremonial torch bearers, during Israel Independence Day in May 2027. Netanyahu said the duty of holding a light in celebration on Independence Day is usually reserved only for citizens of Israel. He told Machchhar the people of Israel would make an exception for him, and adopt and welcome him into the celebratory process. Netanyahu told Machchhar the act of lighting a flame for the country on its Independence Day was the highest honour they could bestow upon him.

Ben Gurion International Airport planned to name a lounge in honour of Machchhar. Politician Almog Cohen stated he would put forth a bill in the Israeli parliament, the Knesset, to formally name the airport lounge in Machchhar's honour. Israeli company Talor Karadi Group took out a billboard on Highway 4 honoring Macchhar with the text: "Thank you, hero", in both Hebrew and Hindi.

Israel chose to honour Machchhar with its highest award for courage displayed by a civilian, the Presidential Award for Civilian Heroism. The award was announced by President of Israel Isaac Herzog, which he would present to Machchhar once he had recovered further. Herzog sent well wishes to Machchhar, saying: "Once he regains strength, it will be my honour and privilege to award him, on behalf of the people of Israel, the State of Israel's Presidential Award for Civilian Heroism".

President Herzog formally wrote to Machchhar, inviting him to Jerusalem to be honoured by the Israeli government, whilst he was recovering in the hospital. Herzog's letter stated "deep gratitude" for the pilot's "exceptional courage and determination", and said he had displayed "great valour". Herzog stated: "Captain Smit Machchhar, you are a hero of Israel, India, and of all humanity", and "You are forever part of Israel's history".

Prime Minister Netanyahu made a call to Indian Prime Minister Modi on 22 October 2026 and formally extended to Modi the invitation he had offered Macchhar, requesting they both be given the honour of lighting a ceremonial torch for Israel's Independence Day. Netanyahu and Modi released statements after the call, reaffireming the bilateral strength of India–Israel relations. Netanyahu's statement said: "Spoke with my friend, Indian Prime Minister Narendra Modi, and invited him to light the torch alongside a brave Indian pilot on Israel’s Independence Day". Netanyahu confirmed Modi had accepted his invitation for the honour at the ceremony.

== Cultural impact ==
Media, including NDTV, WION, and Deccan Herald, compared Machchhar to flight attendant Neerja Bhanot and her actions aboard Pan Am Flight 73, hijacked by Abu Nidal terrorists in September 1986. Bhanot was shot by hijackers while covering children with her body, for which she was posthumously granted the Ashoka Chakra Award. NDTV and WION said Machchhar and Bhanot are similar and heroic. Deccan Herald, The Times of India and India Today commented on their selflessness. CNN-News18 and India TV News said the similarities increased Machchhar's consideration for the Ashoka Chandra Award. The Daily Jagran noted both, "became a symbol of courage".

Sudarsan Pattnaik, an Indian sand artist, created a sand sculpture in honour of Machchhar. Sand artist Munas Kumar Sahoo, also based in Puri, created an artwork tribute to Machchhar. Hat makers in Udaipur crafted a turban known as a pagdi in honour of Machchhar. They used blue to represent the sky, saffron for valour, and the number 174 to represent the number of passengers on the aeroplane.

Indian cricketer Sachin Tendulkar praised Machchhar's actions, saying the world felt pride in his actions, and that he regarded Machchhar as a saviour of his passengers. Fellow cricketers, including Suresh Raina, Virender Sehwag and Yuvraj Singh, sent messages of support. He received comments honouring his actions from Bollywood film actors, including Shamita Shetty, Raveena Tandon and Sonam Kapoor.

Machchhar told Prime Minister Narendra Modi he recited the Hanuman Chalisa while fighting for his life on the airplane, inspiring others to create cultural works in his honour. Artist Yogendra Pal Singh Solanki created an artwork using rice grains to blend India's agrarian-society inspiration with a depiction of Machchhar and Hanuman. Israeli singer Ben Raivitz sang a version of the Hanuman Chalisa as a tribute to Machchhar's recitation on the aeroplane. The actor Shobhinaw Satyaa praised Machchhar for reciting the Hanuman Chalisa during the attack. He commented Machchhar "made us realise the power of the Hanuman Chalisa". He said Machchhar brought attention to their shared faith in a positive light.

In preparation for Navratri, the annual nine-day Hindu festival that honours Shakti, the divine feminine power in Hinduism, youths in Ahmedabad decorated their bodies in honour of Machchhar. The celebrants wore temporary tattoos with Macchhar's likeness whilst preparing for the festival. Asian News International noted the likeness of Machchhar added "a distinctive twist to their festive look".

== Awards and honours ==
Awards and honours received by Smit Machchhar
Year	Award / Honour	Organization	Country	Result	Ref.
2026	Vishisht Gujarat Garima Award	Government of Gujarat	India	Won	
2026	Smit Machchhar Bravery Award	Sun Foundation & Chairman Vikramjit Singh Sahney	India	Won	
2026	Mother Teresa Memorial Award for Social Justice	Harmony Foundation	India	Won	
2026	1 crore Indian rupees (US$103533.6)	Mankind Pharma	India	Won	
2026	National Bravery Award	Federation of Indian Pilots (FIP)	India	Nominated	
2026	Bharat Ratna	Nominated by B. S. Yediyurappa	India	Nominated	
2026	Maha Vir Chakra	Nominated by Mukesh Khanna and Javed Akhtar	India	Nominated	
2026	Ashoka Chakra Award	Nominated by Vikramjit Singh Sahney, Milind Deora, and Kartikeya Sharma	India	Nominated	
2026	Edison Mayor's Heroic Certificate	Edison, New Jersey	United States	Won	
2026	Congressional Record entry	United States House of Representatives	United States	Honoured	
2026	Bipartisan Resolution	Nominated by Josh Gottheimer, Michael McCaul and Don Bacon	United States	Sponsored	
2026	Aviation Commendation	General Civil Aviation Authority	United Arab Emirates	Won	
2026	First-Class Order of Zayed II	Federal government of the United Arab Emirates	United Arab Emirates	Won	
2026	Independence Day Torch Lighting	Prime Minister of Israel	Israel	Invited	
2026	Presidential Award for Civilian Heroism	President of Israel	Israel	Won	
2026	Ben Gurion Airport lounge named in honour	Bill introduced by Almog Cohen	Israel	Introduced	

== See also ==
- Pan Am Flight 73 – 1986 ground hijacking in Pakistan
  - Neerja Bhanot – Indian flight attendant
  - Neerja – 2016 film by Ram Madhvani
- Barbara Jane Harrison – British flight attendant
- Frankie Housley – American flight attendant
- United Airlines Flight 93 – Hijacked 9/11 flight; passengers fought back
  - Todd Beamer – Passenger on United Airlines Flight 93 (1968–2001)
  - Mark Bingham – Passenger on United Airlines Flight 93 (1970–2001)
  - Tom Burnett – American executive and United 93 passenger (1963–2001)
  - Jeremy Glick – Passenger on United Airlines Flight 93 (1970–2001)
