= Michael D. Evans =

American author, journalist and commentator (born 1947)

Michael David Evans
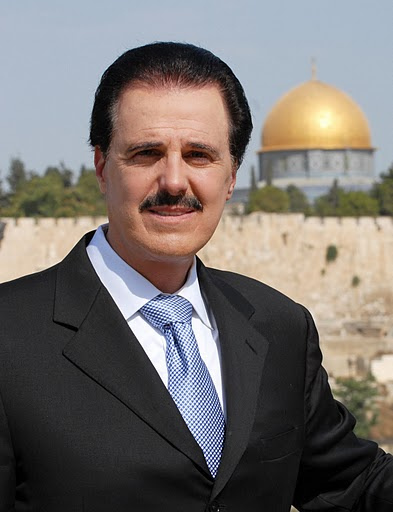
- Evans in Jerusalem in 2011
- Born: June 30, 1947 (age 79); Springfield, Massachusetts
- Occupations: Journalist, author, middle east commentator
- Website: jerusalemprayerteam.org

Michael David Evans (born June 30, 1947) is an American author, journalist, and commentator on Middle East affairs. He founded and serves as the head of many politically conservative Christian organizations.

== Early life ==
Evans was born in Springfield, Massachusetts on June 30, 1947, to a non-practicing Jewish mother whose parents were immigrants from the Soviet Union. His father was a violent alcoholic and wife beater. At age 11, Evans objected to his father beating his mother, and was assaulted; when he recovered, he had what he describes as a dramatic encounter with Jesus Christ, who promised him a future.

== Career ==
Evans has founded several organizations including the Friends of Zion Heritage Center and Museum in Jerusalem, the Corrie ten Boom Museum Haarlem, the Netherlands, and the Jerusalem Prayer Team. He also writes articles for the Christian Broadcasting Network, the Wall Street Journal, Times of Israel and the Jerusalem Post. In 1977, Evans headed B'nai Yeshua, a "Hebrew Christian" group, which was active on college campuses. A campaign charging Jews for Jesus, the B’nai Yeshua and other so-called Hebrew-Christion movements with subterfuge in Long Island resulted in media coverage. Bloggers simultaneously praise Evans for his pro-Israel activism while warning of a possible hidden agenda. In Jerusalem in 2013, Evans was careful not to mention anything other than his desire to represent Christian Zionists "who love the Jewish people".

In October 2024, Evans hosted a solidarity event in Jerusalem commemorating the October 7, 2023, attacks.

=== Ten Boom Fellowship ===
Mike Evans purchased and restored the Corrie ten Boom house in 1983. It is a museum dedicated to telling the story of ten Boom's family, which harbored, fed, and found safe houses for as many as 800 Jews during the Nazi takeover of the Netherlands during World War II. After purchasing and restoring the house, Evans created the Corrie ten Boom Fellowship, a Christian Zionist organization.

=== Friends of Zion Heritage Center ===
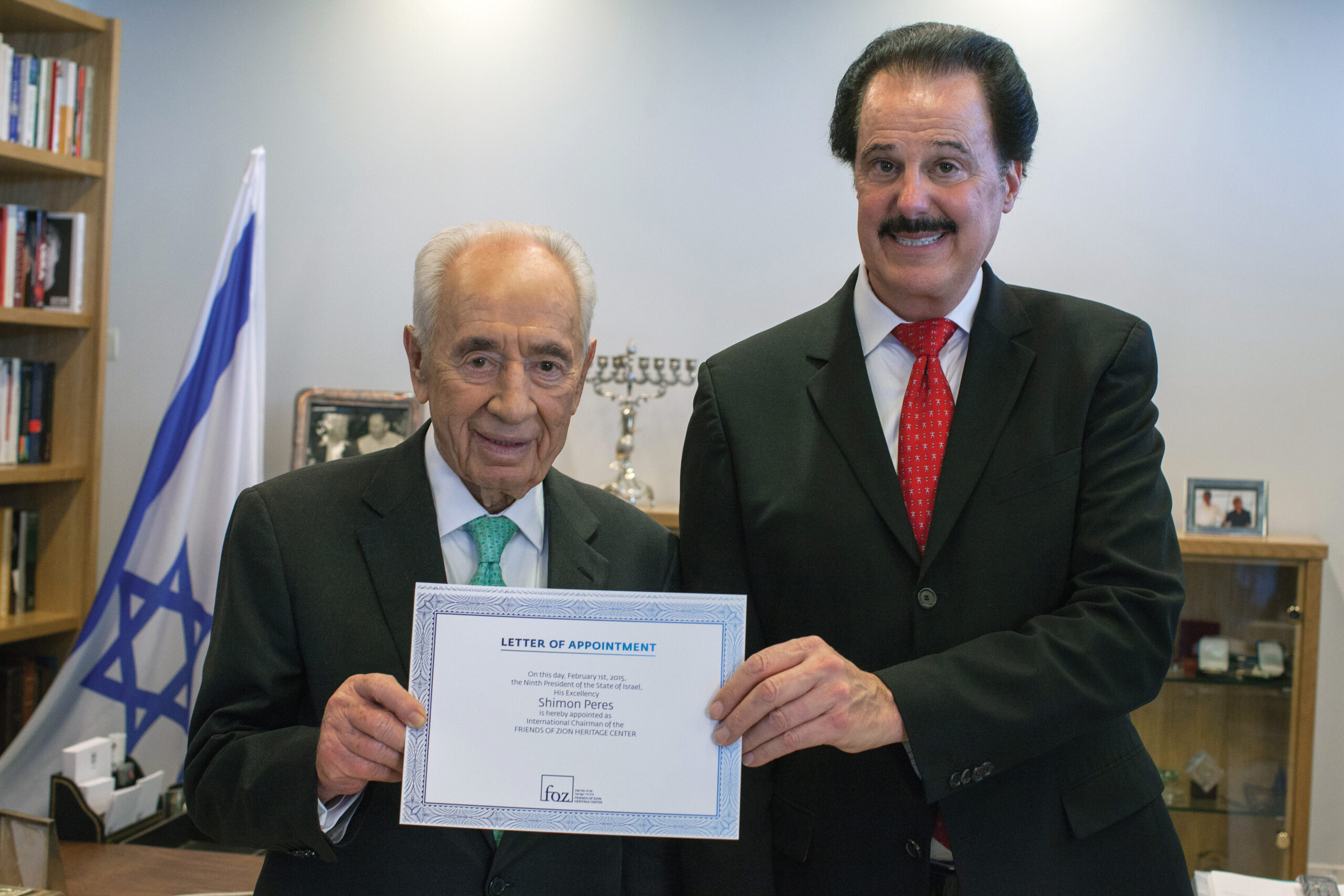
Mike Evans with President Shimon Peres with the certificate installing the latter as the International Chair of the Friends of Zion Center.

In 2015, Evans founded the Friends of Zion Heritage Center (or The Friends of Zion Museum) in Jerusalem with the purpose of highlighting religious tolerance and dialogue between Christian Zionism and the State of Israel and the Jewish people. Israel's ninth president, Shimon Peres, was the international chairman of Friends of Zion and the founder of the Friends of Zion Award to honor outstanding support for Israel.

=== Jerusalem Prayer Team ===
In 2002, Mike Evans began the Jerusalem Prayer Team, which raised money for Ehud Olmert's New Jerusalem Foundation. The Jerusalem Prayer Team funded the construction of the Mike Evans Museum in Jerusalem, officially known as The Friends of Zion Heritage Center.

=== Relationship with Benjamin Netanyahu ===
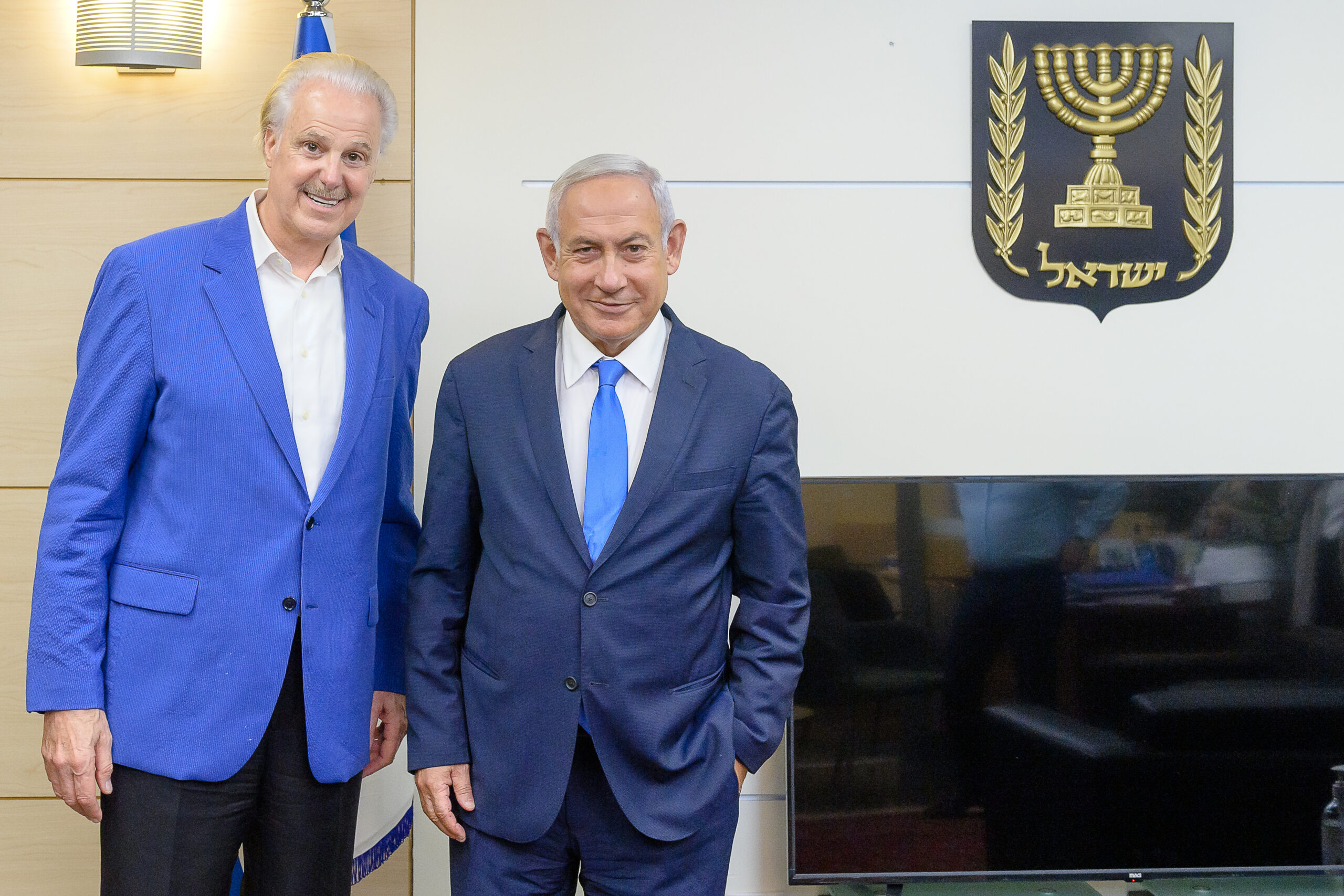
Mike Evans with Prime Minister Benjamin Netanyahu in 2023

Evans has known Israeli prime minister Benjamin Netanyahu since the early 1980s. In June 2021, Netanyahu was replaced as prime minister by Naftali Bennett of the Yamina party. The following month, Evans told a press conference at a Jerusalem hotel: "Bibi Netanyahu is the only man in the world who unites evangelicals." In a blog post for The Times of Israel, he also compared members of the parties that comprised the unity government to "rabid dogs" who wish to "crucify" Netanyahu. This public attack on the new government dented Evans's reputation and influence in Israel. Danny Ayalon, a former Israeli ambassador to the U.S., told Foreign Policy that Evans "may be a friend of Bibi Netanyahu, but it did not give him the right to do what he did".

== Books ==
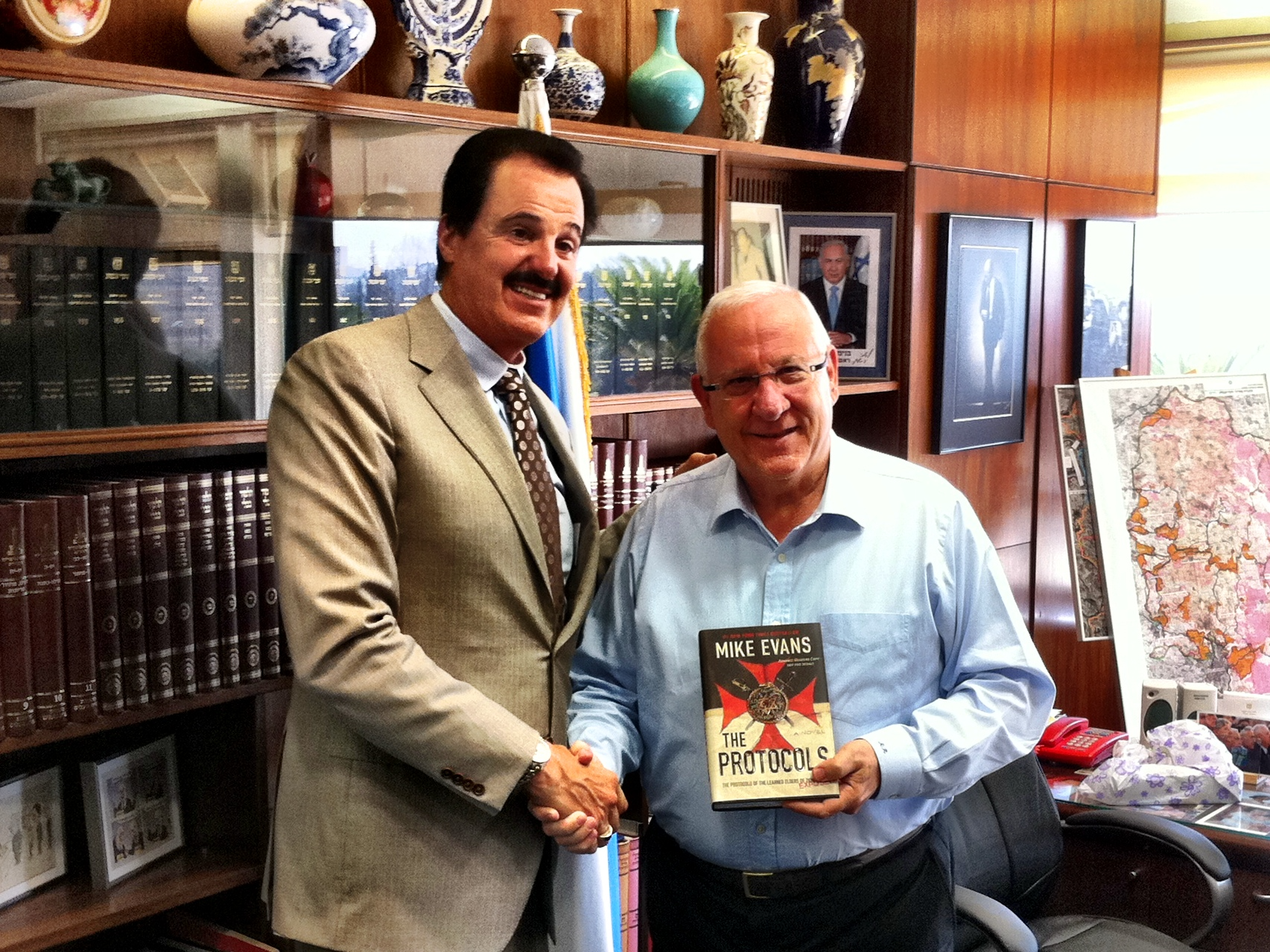
Mike Evans presenting The Protocols book to the Speaker of the Knesset of Israel, Reuven Rivlin.

Evans has written on the Middle East, Christian living, prophecy, and Iraq. His works include fiction and non-fiction books, many self-published. Those that made The New York Times Best Seller list are The Final Move Beyond Iraq: The Final Solution While the World Sleeps, The American Prophecies, and Showdown with Nuclear Iran.

- Shimon Peres: A Novel (2024) ISBN 1629611689
- Netanyahu: A Novel (2024) ISBN 1629611204
- Why Was I Born? (2024) ISBN 1629611379
- Persia: October 7th (2024) ISBN 0935199675
- Armageddon: A Novel of Ukraine (2024) ISBN 1629610976
- Heroes and History (2023) ISBN 162961100X
- The End Times and Armageddon (2023) ISBN 1629610925
- What I Learned as a Moron: Your Road Map to Happiness (2022) ISBN 1629612308
- The Who: Much Too Much (2021) ISBN 1786751151
- Donald Trump & Israel (2021) ISBN 1629612073
- Why Christians Should Support Israel (2021) ISBN 0935199500
- A Great Awakening is Coming (2020) ISBN 1629610925
- Hitler, The Muslim Brotherhood and 9/11 (2023) ISBN 1629612251
- Finding God in the Plague (2020) ISBN 1629612197
- Lights in the Darkness (2019) ISBN 1629611085
- Keep The Jews Out (2019) ISBN 1629611999
- The Good Father (2019) ISBN 1629611824
- Pursuing God's Presence: A 365-Day Devotional (2018) ISBN 1629611808
- The New Hitler (2018) ISBN 1629611743
- The Visionaries (2017) ISBN 1629611263
- Son, I Love You (2017) ISBN 1629611433
- Unleashing God's Favor (2016) ISBN 1629610798
- The Temple: The Center of Gravity (2016) ISBN 1629610801
- Jew Hatred and the Church (2016) ISBN 1629611328
- Islamic Infidels ISIS, Oil and Israel (2016) ISBN 1629610984
- Jew-hatred and the Church (2016) ISBN 1629611328
- Satan You Can't Have Israel (2016) ISBN 1629610887
- Satan You Can't Have My Country: A Spiritual Warfare Guide to Save America (2016) ISBN 1629610860
- The Columbus Code: A Novel (2015) ISBN 1617954845
- Finding Favor with Man (2015) ISBN 1629610674
- Friends of Zion: John Henry Patterson & Orde Charles Wingate (2015) ISBN 1629610747
- The Volunteers (2015) ISBN 1629610550
- See You in New York (2015) ISBN 1629610623
- Finding Favor with God (2015) ISBN 1629610496
- Unleashing God's Favor: 30 Days to Activating God's Blessings in Every Area of Your Life (2015) ISBN 1629610798
- Christopher Columbus: Secret Jew (2014) ISBN 1629610437
- Turning your Pain into Gain (2014) ISBN 1629610372
- Presidents in Prophecy (2014) ISBN 1629610135
- Prayer, Power and Purpose(2014) ISBN 1629610313
- Stand With Israel (2014) ISBN 1629610194
- Countdown: Israel, Iran and Armageddon (2014) ISBN 0935199845
- Jerusalem: Where Heaven and Earth Met (2014) ISBN 0935199799
- Born Again 1967: A Novel of Jerusalem's Restoration in 1967 (2014) ISBN 1629610259
- Born Again: A Novel of Israel's Rebirth in 1948 (2014) ISBN 1629610070
- The History of Christian Zionism (2014) ISBN 0935199187
- Jerusalem: Where Heaven and Earth Met (2014) ISBN 0935199799
- The Kiss of God (2014) ISBN 093519911X
- Betsie ten Boom Promise of God (2014) ISBN 0935199926
- The Revolution: From Egypt to Armageddon (2013) ISBN 0935199209
- Persia: The Final Jihad (2013) ISBN 0935199675
- The Samson Option (2013) ISBN 0935199160
- The Light (2013) ISBN 0935199438
- The Protocols (2013) ISBN 0935199624
- Living in the F.O.G. (Favor of God) (2013) ISBN 0935199578
- The Commanded Blessing (2013) ISBN 1629610011
- The Four Horsemen (Gamechanger 3) (2013) ISBN 0935199012
- Seven Days (2012) ISBN 0935199543
- The Final Generation (2012) ISBN 0935199365
- Living Fear Free (2012) ISBN 0935199101
- The Locket (2012) ISBN 0935199268
- The Candidate (2012) ISBN 0935199470
- GameChanger (2010) ISBN 0935199055
- Cursed: The Conspiracy to Divide Jerusalem (2010) ISBN 0935199128
- Atomic Iran: Countdown to Armageddon...How the West Can Be Saved (2009) ISBN 0935199403
- Showdown with Nuclear Iran: Radical Islam's Messianic Mission to Destroy Israel and Cripple the United States (2009) ISBN 159555288X
- Jimmy Carter: The Liberal Left and World Chaos: A Carter/Obama Plan That Will Not Work (2009) ISBN 0935199330
- Betrayed (2023) ISBN 1629610925
- The Final Move Beyond Iraq: The Final Solution While the World Sleeps (2007) ISBN 1599791889 The New York Times Best Seller Paperback
- Israel Reborn 70 Years of Miracles (2007) ISBN 1629611506
- Showdown with Nuclear Iran: Iran's Messianic Mission to Destroy Israel and Cripple the United States (2006) ISBN 1595550755
- The American Prophecies: Ancient Scriptures Reveal Our Nation's Future (2005) ISBN 0446693286 The New York Times Best Seller Paperback
- God Wrestling: Like Jacob of Old, A Life-Changing Encounter with the Almighty (2004) ISBN 0764227580
- Beyond Iraq: The Next Move—Ancient Prophecy and Modern Day Conspiracy Collide (2003) ISBN 1593790104
- The Prayer of David: In Times of Trouble (2003) ISBN 0768430240
- The Unanswered Prayers of Jesus (2003) ISBN 0764227572
- The Jerusalem Scroll (1999) ISBN 0785287159
- Jerusalem Betrayed: Ancient Prophecy and Modern Conspiracy Collide in the Holy City (1997) ISBN 0849940028
- The Return (1986) ISBN 0840755015
- Israel: America's Key to Survival (1983) ISBN 0935199020

== Honors ==
- In 2006, Evans was granted an Honorary Doctor of Political Science by Grand Canyon University in Phoenix, Arizona.
- In 2018, Mike Evans wins Jerusalem Post 'Lion of Jerusalem Award'.
- In 2022, Bobby Brown, Senior Vice President for Ariel University in Israel, nominated Evans for the Nobel Peace Prize for his work combating antisemitism.

== Personal life ==
Michael Evans is married to Carolyn, founder of the Christian Woman of the Year Association. They have four children and nine grandchildren.
