= Anti-Hijacking Act, 2016 =

Act in India enforcing the Hague Hijacking Convention

Parliament of India
- Long title: The Anti-Hijacking Act, 2016 No. 30 of 2016
- Citation: Act No. 30 of 2016
- Territorial extent: India
- Passed by: Rajya Sabha
- Passed: 4 May 2016
- Passed by: Lok Sabha
- Passed: 9 May 2016
- Assented to: 13 May 2016
- Commenced: 5 July 2017

Legislative history

Initiating chamber: Rajya Sabha
- Bill title: The Anti-Hijacking Bill, 2014
- Bill citation: Bill No. LIII of 2014
- Introduced by: Ashok Gajapathi Raju
- Introduced: 17 December 2014
- Committee report: Standing Committee Report

Final stages
- Reported from conference committee: 11 March 2015

Repeals
- The Anti-Hijacking Act, 1982

Summary
- An Act to give effect to the Convention for the Suppression of Unlawful Seizure of Aircraft and for matters connected therewith.
- Status: In force

The Anti-Hijacking Act, 2016 is an Act of the Parliament of India intended to enforce the Hague Hijacking Convention and the 2010 Beijing Protocol Supplementary to the Convention. The act repeals and replaces the Anti-Hijacking Act, 1982. The new act broadens the definition of hijacking to include any attempt to seize or gain control of an aircraft using "any technological means", which accounts for the possibility that the hijackers may not be physically present on board the aircraft.

== Background ==
The Narendra Modi administration believed that The Anti-Hijacking Act, 1982 was not comprehensive enough to deal with modern-day hijack techniques, did not penalize individuals who made false hijack threats, and had weak penalties that did not serve as sufficient deterrent to potential hijackers.

== Legislative history ==
The Anti-Hijacking Bill, 2014 (Bill No. LIII of 2014) was introduced in the Rajya Sabha on 17 December 2014 by the Minister of Civil Aviation, Ashok Gajapathi Raju. The bill was referred to the Parliamentary Standing Committee on Transport, Tourism and Culture on 29 December, and the Committee submitted its report on 11 March 2015. The bill as recommended by the Committee was passed by the Rajya Sabha on 4 May 2016 and by the Lok Sabha on 9 May 2016. The bill received assent from then President Pranab Mukherjee on 13 May 2016, and was notified in The Gazette of India on 16 May 2016. The Act came into force on 5 July 2017, and has led to more stringent punishment in at least one case for a hijacking-related hoax.
