= Sari Srulovitch =

Israeli artist and silversmith

Sari Srulovitch 'סרי שרולוביץ
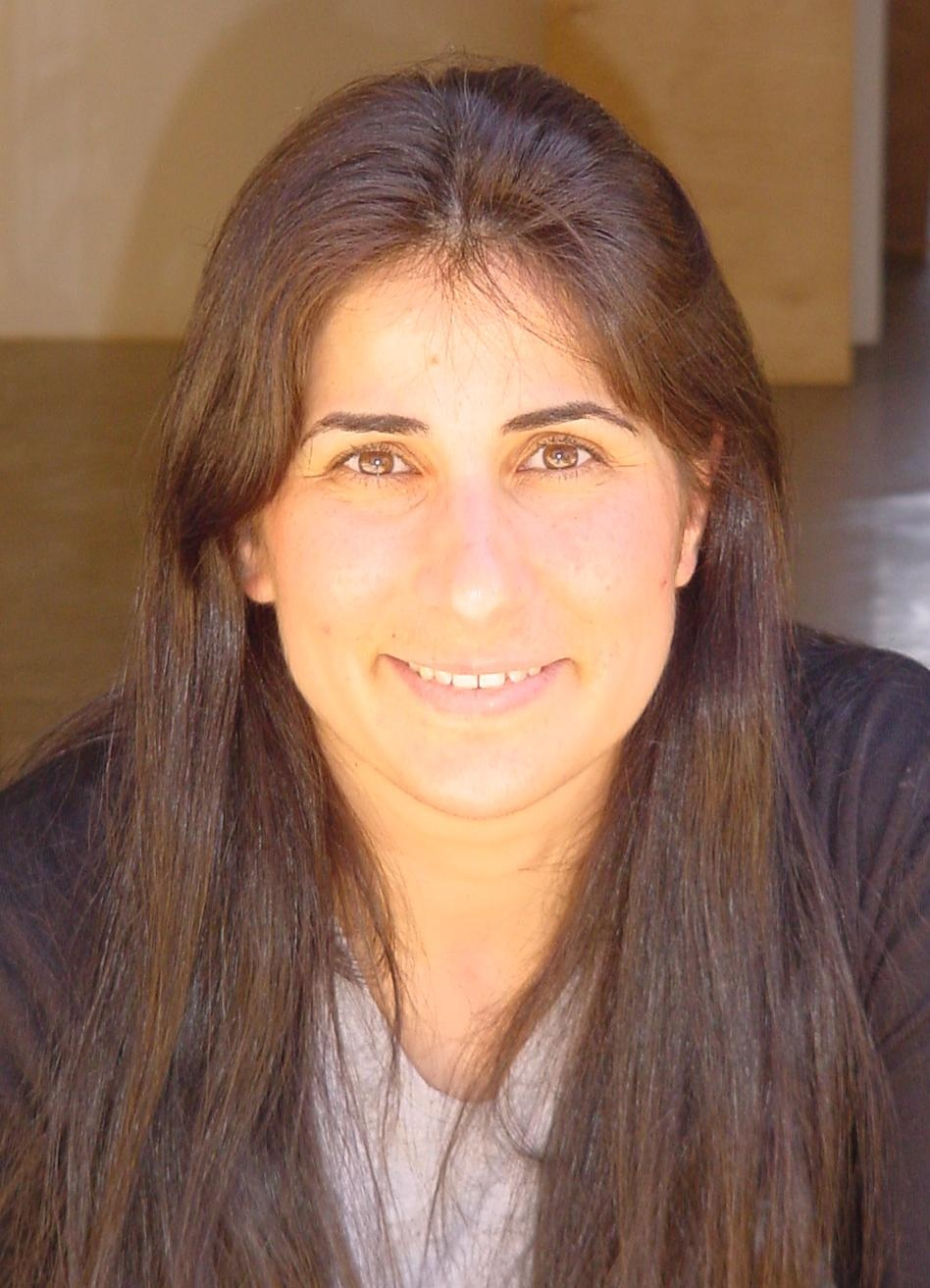
- Born: 1964 (age 61–62); Jerusalem, Israel
- Education: Bezalel Academy of Arts and Design; Royal College of Art, London
- Known for: Silversmithing; Jewish ceremonial art

Sari Srulovitch (Hebrew: 'סרי שרולוביץ; born 1964) is an Israeli artist and silversmith.

== Biography ==
Sari Srulovitch was born in Jerusalem. She studied at the metal work and jewelry department of Bezalel Academy of Arts and Design and the Royal College of Art in London. She lectured for several years at Bezalel and WIZO College of Design in Haifa.

== Art career ==
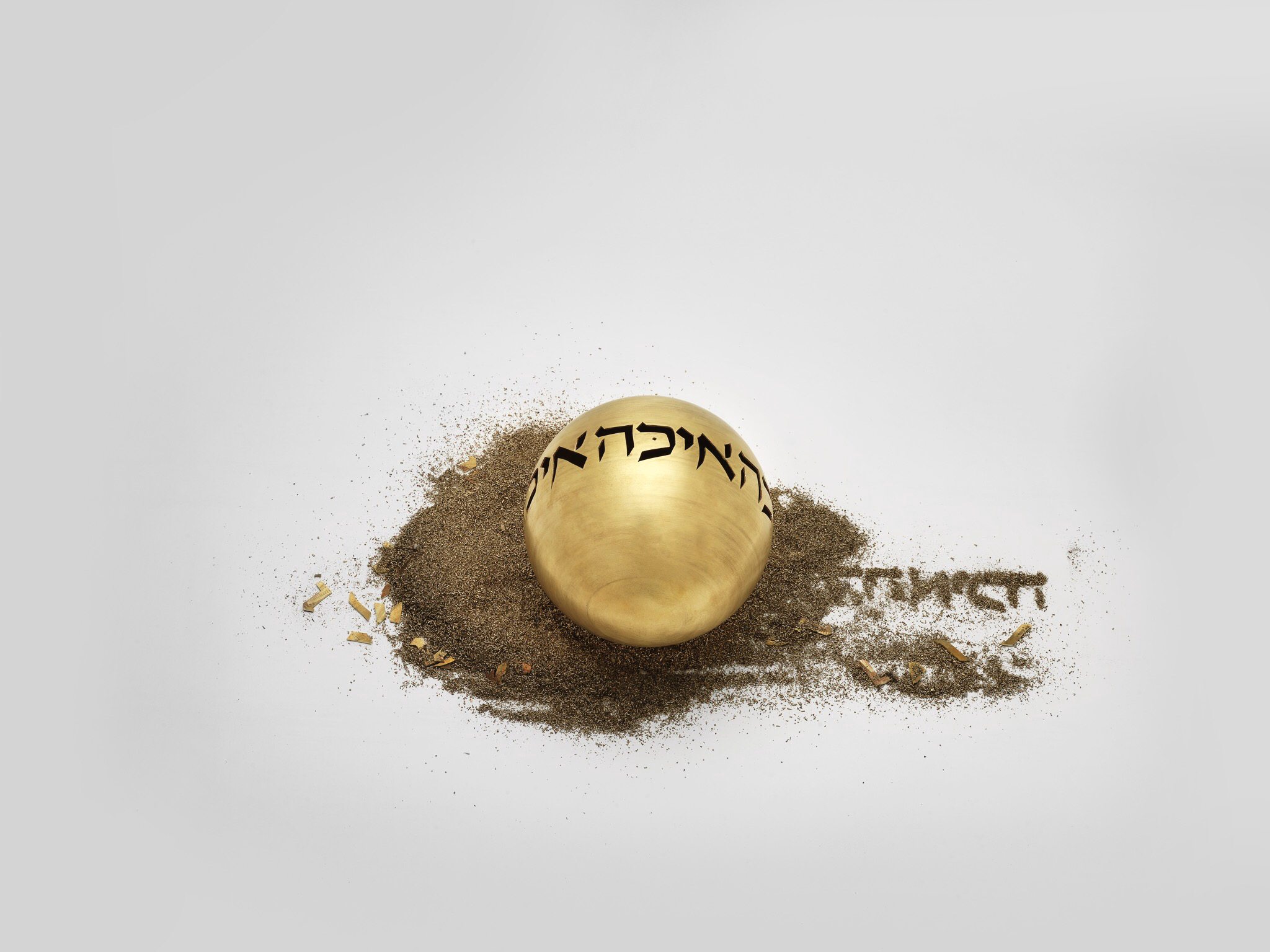
"Ayekkah" memorial object

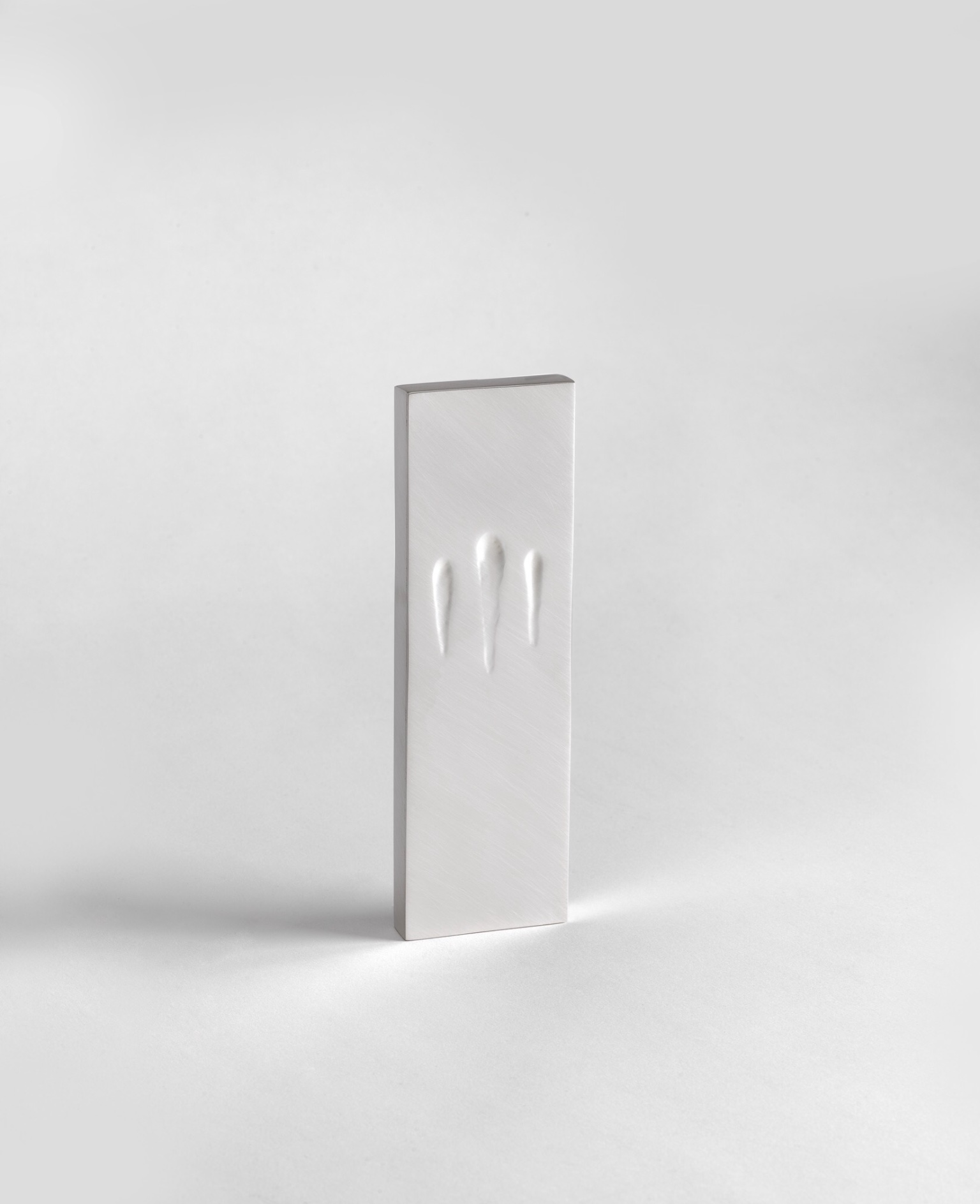
"Touching" mezuzah

Srulovitch creates handcrafted Jewish ceremonial art using a combination of modern technology and traditional silversmithing methods such as raising, hammering and chasing.

The Israel Museum included silver Torah shields and pointers created by Srulovitch in an exhibit entitled "Pointing the Way: Women Design Ceremonial Objects" that opened in the fall of 2013.

Srulovitch has a workshop on Jerusalem's Arts and Crafts Lane, Hutzot Hayotzer.

At her Jerusalem Biennale exhibit in December 2021 in the former synagogue of the historic Shaare Zedek building on Jaffa Road, Srulovitch showed a collection of ceremonial Judaica and life-cycle pieces imbued with symbolism as well as social commentary.

== Artistic motifs ==
According to Srulovitch, stripes are a leitmotif in her works: “The stripes woven into the tallit (prayer shawl), the stripes impressed upon the body by the straps of the tefillin (phylacteries), even written script – in all these I see Jewish ornamentation. The silver Torah shield I designed is made of interwoven stripes, a homage to the ancient art of weaving.”

== Exhibitions ==
- Within Four Cubits - solo exhibition (2021)

== Awards and recognition ==
- 1987 Prize for Outstanding Achievements, Bezalel Academy of Art and Design, Jerusalem
- 1987 Lockman Prize for Applied Design, Bezalel Academy of Arts and Design, Jerusalem
- 1988 Ron Eitan Award for Jewelry Design, Bezalel Academy of Arts and Design, Jerusalem
- 1989 Romi Shapira Prize for Judaica, Bezalel Academy of Arts and Design, Jerusalem
- 1989 Meisler Award for Outstanding Design
- 1989 Outstanding Student Award, Bezalel Academy of Arts and Design, Jerusalem
- 1990 Crafts Award for Enamelwork, Alix de Rothschild Foundation, Jerusalem
- 1989 Prize for Outstanding Achievements, Bezalel Academy of Art and Design, Jerusalem
- 1989 America-Israel Cultural Foundation, Sharett Scholarship for Excellence
- 2002 Finalist for "Mezuzah", Spertus Judaica Prize, Spertus Museum, Chicago
- 2009 Crafts Award for Judaica, Alix de Rothschild Foundation, Jerusalem

== See also ==
- Visual arts in Israel
