= List of non-governmental organisations in India =

New Delhi This is a list of notable nonprofit organisations, charitable organisations and non-governmental organisations (NGOs) working in India or connected with Indian diaspora.

List of Nonprofit and Non-Governmental Organisations in India
Name	Category	Date of foundation	Headquarters	Founder(s)
World Vision India		1962	Chennai	Robert Pierce
Akshaya Patra Foundation	Children	2000	Bengaluru	Bhaktivedanta Swami Prabhupada
Nishchaya Foundation	Children; Health Care; Education; Environment	1999	New Delhi	Jean Marie Grillon; Sujeet Singh
Butterflies India	Children; Human Rights	1989	New Delhi	Rita Panicker
Child In Need Institute	Children; Education	1974	Kolkata	Samir Chaudhuri
SaveLIFE Foundation	Road safety; Emergency medical care	2008	Delhi	Krishen Mehta Piyush Tewari
EVidyaloka	Children; Education	28 January 2011	Bengaluru	Satish Viswanathan; Venkataraman Sriraman
Save the Children India	Children	2008	Gurugram	Sudarshan Suchi (CEO)
Sanjhi Sikhiya	Education	2018	Fatehgarh Sahib	Simranpreet Singh Oberoi
Goonj	Community Development; Humanitarian Aids	1999	New Delhi	Anshu Gupta
Gurshaahi	Punjabi Literature; Rural Libraries; Education and Culture	2019	Bathinda	Arpit Arya; Kulwinder Sharma; Paramjot Joga; Sharandeep Singh
Panjab Digital Library	Language and Literature; Cultural Preservation; Education	2003	Chandigarh	Davinder Pal Singh
Federation of Associations of Maharashtra	Trade association	1979	Maharashtra	Lalitbhai Mehta Navneet lal Lalubhai Shah
HelpAge India	Community Development; Elderly care	April 1978	New Delhi	Cecil Jackson-Cole; John F. Pearson; Samson Daniel
HOPE (Hold On Pain Ends) Charitable Trust	Urban Development; Health	2014	Kerala	Mahesh Parameswaran Nair
Katha	Children; Education	1988	Chennai	Geeta Dharmarajan
Lepra	Community Development; HIV/AIDS	1924	United Kingdom	Leonard Rogers
Maher	Children; Women	2 February 1997	Pune	Lucy Kurien
Maitri Pune	Malnutrition Child mortality	1997	Pune	Anil Shidore
MITRA	Community Development; Human Rights	2004	Mumbai	B.G. Deshmukh
MOHAN Foundation	Healthcare	1997	Chennai	Sunil Shroff
Narayan Seva Sansthan	Children; Disabled	1985	Udaipur	Kailash Ji Agrawal 'Manav'
People's Archive of Rural India	Community Development; Education; Tribal Upliftment	2014	Mumbai	Palagummi Sainath
Pratham	Children; Education	1994	Mumbai	Madhav Chavan; Farida Lambay
Prayas	Children; Trafficking	1988	Delhi	Amod Kanth
Project Nanhi Kali	Children; Education	1996	Mumbai	Anand Mahindra
Salaam Baalak Trust	Children; Education	1988	Delhi	Praveen Nair
SERUDS	Children; Elderly Care; Education; Health	2003	Andhra Pradesh	Mallikarjuna Gorla
Seva Mandir	Rural and Community Development	1968	Rajasthan	Mohan Sinha Mehta
Shoshit Seva Sangh	Children; Education	16 July 2004	Patna	J. K. Sinha
Sree Ramaseva Mandali	Arts; Education	1939	Bengaluru	S. V. Narayanaswamy Rao; S. N. Varadaraj
Shaheed Bhagat Singh Seva Dal	Health; Human rights; Sikhism	unknown	Delhi	Jitender Singh Shunty
Shakti Shalini	Women	31 August 1987	Delhi	Shahjehan Aapa; Satya Rani Chadha
Tulir	Children; Sex Abuse		Chennai	Vidya Reddy
Church's Auxiliary for Social Action	Humanitarian Aid; Education; Sustainable Livelihood; Skill Development; development; Gender Justice	1947	Delhi	Sushant Agarawal
Leaf Bank	Environment Conservation	2023	Delhi	RJ Raawat
Akanksha Foundation	Education	1991	Mumbai	Shaheen Mistri
CHD Group	Global Public Health Medical Relief in Disasters Nutrition Child Health Road Safety Primary Health Care	2014	Mangaluru	Dr Edmond Fernandes Cynthia Fernandes
Social Network for Assistance to People	Human Rights Community Development	2008	Kolkata	
Nilgiri Wildlife and Environmental Association	Environment	1877	Ooty	
Bihar Mahila Samaj	Women Human Rights Community Development	1967	Patna	Urmila Prasad Nalini Rajimwale Neelima Sarkar Gauri Ganguli
Chavara Cultural Centre	Women Community Development Education Culture	1971	Kochi	Fr. Albert Nambiar Parambil
Zo Reunification Organization	Ethnicity	1988	Aizawl	T. Gougin

== See also ==
- Non-governmental organisations in India
- Nonprofit organization
- List of think tanks in India
