= Non-governmental organisations in India =

Indian non-governmental organisations (NGOs) can be set up under various Indian laws.

== Types of legal entities ==
The different legal entities under which civil society organisations can register themselves are:

=== Registered societies ===
Societies Registration Act, 1860 is a Central Act for registering not-for-profit organisations. Almost all the states in India have adopted (with modifications, if any) the Central Act for creating state-level authorities for registering various types of not-for-profit entities. According to the Act, any seven persons who subscribe to the Memorandum of Association (MOA) can register a society. The memorandum should include the name of the society; its objectives; names, addresses and occupations of the members subscribing to it as well as the first governing body to be constituted on registration.

=== Trust ===
==== Public trust ====
Public trusts can be created for public charitable purposes. There is no All India Level Act for setting up public charitable trusts. Some of the states in India have enacted the Public Charitable Trust Act, while most states in India do not have a trust Act. An NGO can be created only under a public trust Act. Madhya Pradesh and Rajasthan have independent state-level public trust Acts. States like West Bengal, Jharkhand and Bihar have no Act to register a public trust.

A trust can be registered in one state, but the same has the scope to operate in any number of states. In the states of Maharashtra and Gujarat, all organisations that are registered as Society are by default also registered as public trusts under Bombay Public Trust Act, 1950.

==== Private trust ====
A private trust, created under and governed by the Indian Trusts Act of 1882, aims at managing assigned trust properties for private or religious purpose. A private trust does not enjoy the privileges and tax benefits that are available for public trusts or NGOs.

=== Non profit companies ===
Conferring of corporate personality to associations that promote cultural and charitable objectives, but exempting them from some cumbersome requirements (which are essentially for regulation of business bodies but are difficult for compliance by non-profit companies), are the noteworthy features that are provided under the Companies Act, 2013.

According to section 25(1) (Companies Act, 1956): "Where it is proved to the satisfaction of the Central Government that an association is about to be formed as a limited company for promoting commerce, art, science, religion, charity or any other useful objectives, intends to apply its profits, if any, or other income in promoting its objectives, and to prohibit the payment of any dividend to its members, the Central Government may, by license, l direct that the association may be registered as a company with limited liability, without addition to its name of the word "Limited" or the words "Private Limited".

== Comparison between a trust, a society and a non-profit company ==
| | Public Trust | Society | Section 8 Company |
|---|---|---|---|
| Statute/Legislation | Indian Trust Act 1882 | Societies Registration Act of 1860 | Companies Act of 2013 |
| Jurisdiction of the Act | Concerned state where registered | Concerned state where registered | Concerned state where registered |
| Authority | Charity Commissioner/Deputy Registrar | Registrar of Societies | Registrar of Companies |
| Registration | As Trust | As Society (and by default also as Trust in Maharashtra and Gujarat) | As Section 8 Company |
| Main Document | Trust deed | Memorandum of Association and Rules & Regulations | Memorandum and Articles of Association. |
| Stamp Duty | Trust deed to be executed a non-judicial stamp paper of prescribed value | No stamp paper required for Memorandum of Association and Rules & Regulations | No stamp paper required for Memorandum and Articles of Association |
| Number of persons needed to register | Minimum two trustees; no upper limit | Minimum seven, no upper limit | Minimum two, no upper limit |
| Board of Management | Trustees | Governing body or council/managing or executive committee | board of directors/Managing Committee |
| Mode of succession on board of management | Usually by appointment | Usually election by members of the general body | Usually election by members of the general body |

== Types based on use ==
=== Co-operative societies ===
In India, cooperative societies are regarded as instruments to mobilise and aggregate community effort to eliminate layers of middlemen in any product or service supply chain hence resulting in greater benefit sharing for the grassroot farmer, worker or artisans. The Cooperative Credit Societies Act, 1904 enabled formation of cooperatives for supplying to farmers cheap credit and protect them from exploitation in the hands of the moneylenders. The cooperative act 1912 expanded the sphere of cooperation and provided for supervision by central organisation.

=== Multi-state co-operative societies ===
The Multi-state Co-operative Societies Act, 2002 which substitutes the earlier statute of 1984, facilitates the incorporation of cooperative societies whose objects and functions spread over to several states. The act provides for formation of both primary (with both individual and institutional members) and federal cooperatives (with only institutional memberships). Any application for the registration of a multi-state cooperative society, of which all the members are individuals, should be signed by at least fifty persons from each of the states concerned. In case of a society of which members are cooperative societies, it should be signed by duly authorised representative of at least five such societies registered in different states.

=== Trade unions ===
Trade union means any combination, whether temporary or permanent, formed primarily for the purpose of regulating the relations between workmen and employers or between workmen and workmen or between employers and employers, or for imposing restrictive conditions on the conduct of any trade or business, and includes any federation of two or more Trade Unions.

=== Religious bodies ===
Religious bodies are frequently registered as NGOs.

== Laws governing NGOs in India ==
=== Major NGOs ===
The list of NGOs operating in India is huge but some of the most prominent ones are World Vision India (1962, Chennai, Robert Pierce); Akshaya Patra Foundation (2000, Bengaluru, Bhaktivedanta Swami Prabhupada); Butterflies India (1989, New Delhi. Rita Panicker); Child Rights and You (1979, Mumbai, Rippan Kapoor); Deepalaya (1979, Delhi, T. K. Mathew & others); Child In Need Institute (1974, Kolkata, Samir Chaudhuri); SaveLIFE Foundation (2008, Delhi, Krishen Mehta); Evangelistic Association of the East (1924, Kerala, Geevarghese Cor-Episcopa Athunkal); EVidyaloka (2011, Bengaluru, Satish Viswanathan); Save the Children India (2008, Gurugram, Sudarshan Suchi (CEO)); Sanjhi Sikhiya (2018. Fatehgarh Sahib, Simranpreet Singh Oberoi); Goonj (1999, New Delhi, Anshu Gupta); Gurshaahi (2019, Bathinda, Arpit Arya & others); Panjab Digital Library (2003, Chandigarh, Davinder Pal Singh); HelpAge India (1978, New Delhi, Cecil Jackson-Cole & others).

The list also includes HOPE (Hold On Pain Ends) Charitable Trust (2014, Kerala, Mahesh Parameswaran Nair); Katha (1988. Chennai. Geeta Dharmarajan); Lepra (1924, United Kingdom, Leonard Rogers); Maher (1997, Pune, Lucy Kurien); Maitri Pune (1997, Pune, Anil Shidore): Mobile nurseries (1969, Delhi, Meera Mahadevan); MITRA (2004, Mumbai, B.G. Deshmukh); MOHAN Foundation (1997, Chennai. Sunil Shroff); Narayan Seva Sansthan (1985, Udaipur, Kailash Ji Agrawal 'Manav'); People's Archive of Rural India (2014, Mumbai, Palagummi Sainath); End Poverty (2009, Gurgaon, Vinod Kaushik); Pratham (1994, Mumbai, Madhav Chavan & others); Prayas (1988, Delhi, Amod Kanth); Project Nanhi Kali (1996. Mumbai, Anand Mahindra); Salaam Baalak Trust (1988, Delhi. Praveen Nair); SERUDS (2003, Andhra Pradesh, Mallikarjuna Gorla); Seva Mandir (1968, Rajasthan, Mohan Sinha Mehta); Shoshit Seva Sangh (2004, Patna, J. K. Sinha); Sree Ramaseva Mandali (1939, Bengaluru, S. V. Narayanaswamy Rao & others); Shaheed Bhagat Singh Seva Dal (Delhi, Jitender Singh Shunty); Tulir (Chennai, Vidya Reddy); Church's Auxiliary for Social Action (1947, Delhi, Sushant Agarawal); Leaf Bank (2023, Delhi, RJ Raawat); Akanksha Foundation (1991, Mumbai, Shaheen Mistri), and Chavara Cultural Centre (1971, Kochi, Fr. Albert Nambiar Parambil).

Some other NGOs are CHD Group (2014, Mangaluru, Dr Edmond Fernandes & others); Social Network for Assistance to People (2008, Kolkata); Nilgiri Wildlife and Environment Association (1877, Ooty).

== Controversy ==
=== Foreign Funding Allegation ===
Intelligence Bureau, in a report accused "foreign-funded" NGOs of "serving as tools for foreign policy interests of western governments" by sponsoring agitations against nuclear and coal-fired power plants and anti-GMO agitation across the country. The NGOs are said to be working through a network of local organisations to negatively impact GDP growth by 2–3%. The report says,

A significant number of Indian NGOs funded by donors based in US, UK, Germany and Netherlands have been noticed to be using people-centric issues to create an environment, which lends itself to stalling development projects.

It alleged that Greenpeace was leading a "massive effort to take down India's coal-fired power plant and coal mining activity" by using foreign funds to "create protest movements under 'Coal Network' umbrella at prominent coal block and coal-fired power plant locations in India". The Intelligence Bureau said the foreign NGOs and their Indian arms were serving as tools to advance Western foreign policy interests. "Greenpeace aims to fundamentally change the dynamics of India's energy mix by disrupting and weakening the relationship between key players," the IB report said.

In April 2015, the Government of India shared a list of over 42,000 NGOs with Financial Intelligence Unit (FIU) to check suspicious foreign funding amid the crackdown on some top international donors for flouting the Foreign Contribution (regulation) Act, 2010. These 42,273 NGOs were put under watch after intelligence reports claimed that several charity organisations are diverting funds for purposes other than the permitted use of foreign contribution. The list includes NGOs operating in cultural, religious, social, economic and educational fields. For the first time, the government has clearly defined the sectors in which it has listed Christian missionaries, Hindu, Sikh and Muslim religious groups receiving foreign contribution besides other activities of NGOs in which funds are claimed to be utilised. There is also suspicion that money launderers could use the legitimate route to wire illicit money. Many of them are Christian Missionaries and other religious groups who are found to evade taxes.

Following the enquiry, permits of about 8,875 NGOs have been revoked for a variety of reasons ranging from non-filing of returns or non-compliance with Foreign Contribution Regulation Act (FCRA).

== See also ==
- NGOs in West Africa
- Non-profit laws of India
- List of non-governmental organisations in India
- List of think tanks in India
