= Katha Books =

- Industry: Publishing
- Founded: 1988
- Founder: Geeta Dharmarajan
- Headquarters: Delhi, India
- Products: Books
- Website: Katha Books

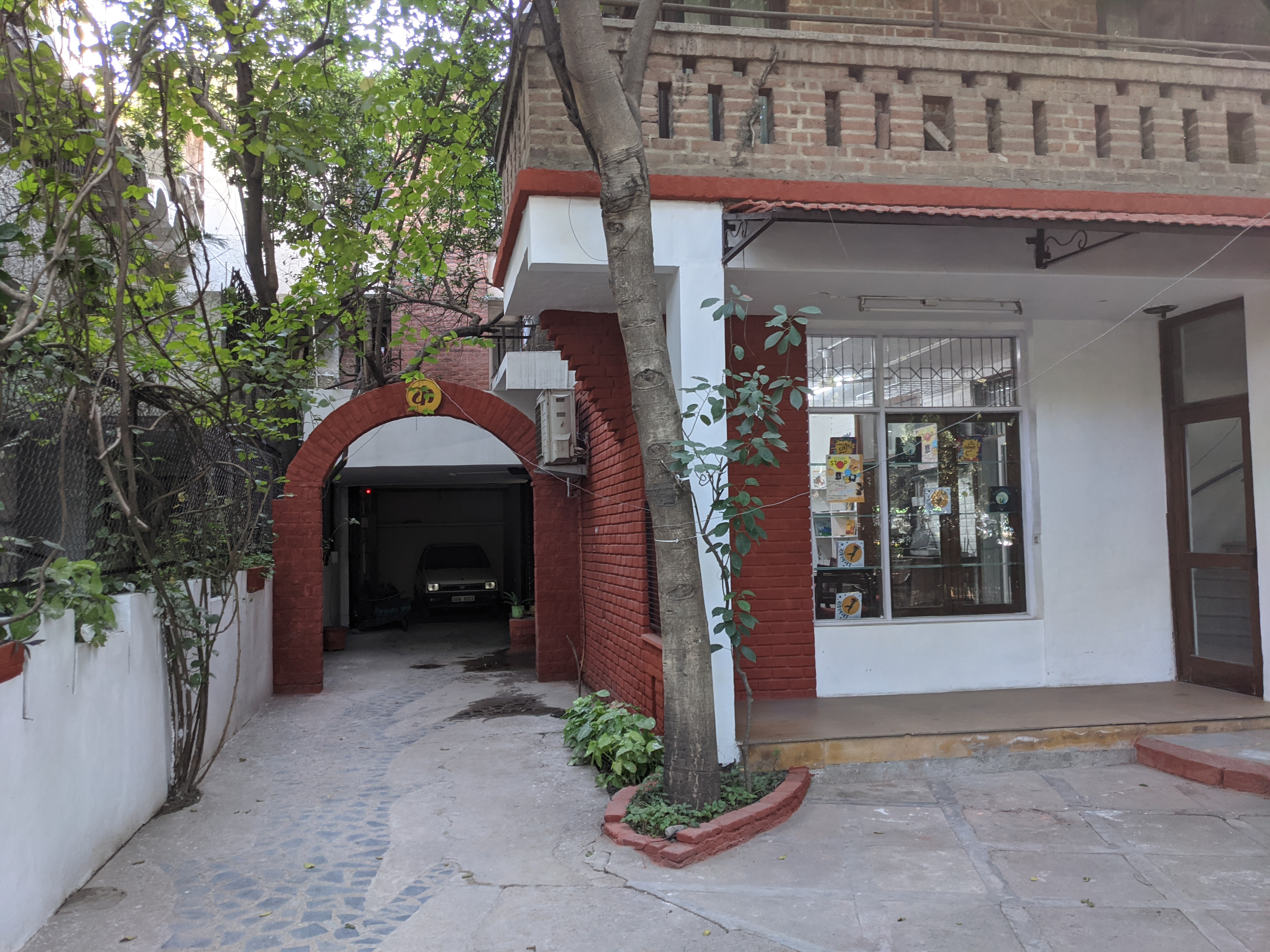
le:Katha Book Shop.

Katha Books is a publishing house owned by Katha, that works in the fields of Indian language translations, community empowerment and child welfare. It was founded in 1988 Geeta Dharmarajan.

Known for negotiating new spaces in children's literature in translation especially, Katha has been nominated six times for the Astrid Lindgren Memorial Award in 2010, 2013, 2014, 2015, 2016 & 2017, sometimes dubbed as the "Nobel Prize in Literature." Today it is a leading name for translations in Indian publishing, and produces stories from contemporary India, unusual Indian folklore and unsung mythology, translated into English and Hindi from 21 regional Indian languages. Katha is "exclusively devoted to translating regional Indian writers into English."

Books for Adults: Nearly 200 Katha books for adults including translations in 21 Indian languages have been published.
Katha Prize Stories: Written for adults.
Books for Children Nearly 122 books recommended by NCERT and CBSE.

== See also ==
- Katha NGO
