= Pragya Prasun =

Indian founder of NGO supporting survivors of acid attacks

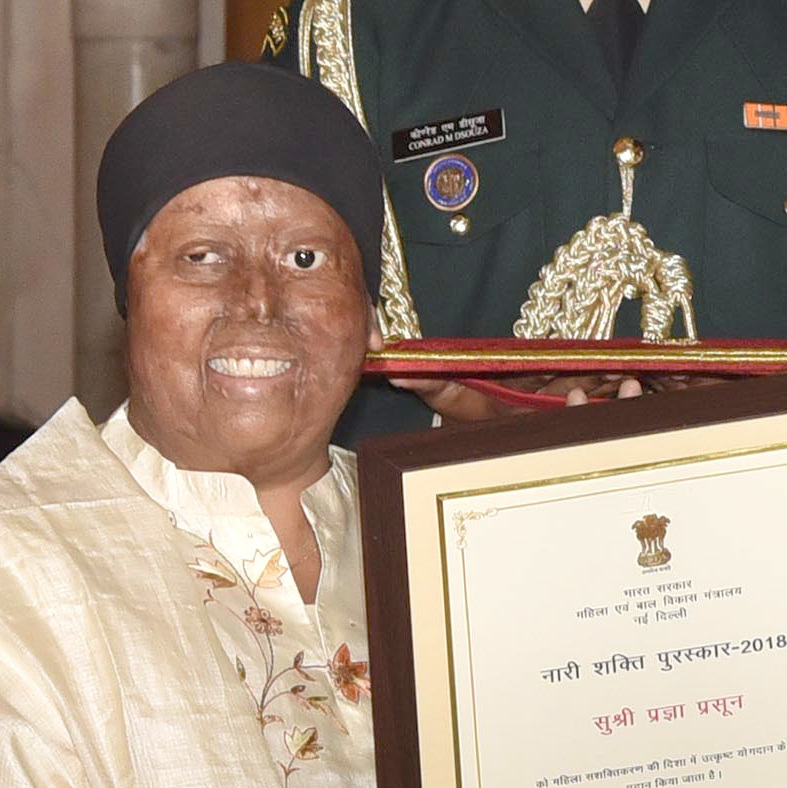
- Prasun receives the Nari Shakti Puraskar award
- Born: circa 1983; Dhanbad in Jharkhand, India
- Occupation: activist
- Known for: recipient of the Nari Shakti Puraskar award

Pragya Prasun (born c. 1983) is an Indian activist who survived an acid attack and set up the Atijeevan Foundation. The organisation has supported more than 250 other survivors and in 2019, she received the Nari Shakti Puraskar (lit. "Woman Power Award") awarded the Government of India in recognition of her work.

== Life ==
Pragya Prasun was born circa 1983 in Dhanbad in Jharkhand, India, the eldest of four children. Her father worked for Coal India and the family moved to Varanasi. Prasun married her husband in Varanasi in 2006. Twelve days later when she was travelling to New Delhi by train, a jealous former suitor attacked her with acid as she was sleeping. Fellow passengers including a doctor helped to care for Prasun before she was taken to a hospital with 47% burns. The perpetrator was arrested when he tried to attack Prasun again the next day and was handed a prison sentence of four and a half years. After nine surgeries, Prasun built a family with two children and runs a catering business. She also began to help other survivors.

== Atijeevan Foundation ==
Prasun set up the Atijeevan Foundation in 2013. It is a non-governmental organisation which helps survivors of acid attacks, funding surgeries and other treatments for people recovering from an attack. Every year in India there are more than 100 reported acid attacks, mainly on women, but Prasun believes the real figure exceeds 1,000. As of 2019, the foundation had supported more than 250 survivors. Surgeries are carried out at hospitals in Bengaluru, Chennai, Delhi and Mumbai. The Stanley Medical College Hospital in Chennai pledged in 2018 to support the group by offering free hair transplants.

== Awards and recognition ==
President of India Ram Nath Kovind presented a 2018 Nari Shakti Puraskar award to Prasun in 2019, in recognition of her work. This award is given by the Ministry of Women and Child Development of the Government of India to individual women or to institutions that work towards the cause of women empowerment.
