= Shaheed Bhagat Singh (disambiguation) =

Shaheed Bhagat Singh refers to Bhagat Singh (1907–1931), Indian anti-colonial revolutionary and martyr.

Shaheed Bhagat Singh may also refer to:

- Shaheed Bhagat Singh College, of Delhi University, India
- Shaheed Bhagat Singh State University, in Firozpur, Punjab, India
- Shaheed Bhagat Singh Stadium, in Firozpur, Punjab, India

== See also ==
- Chandigarh Airport, India, officially Shaheed Bhagat Singh International Airport
- Shaheed Bhagat Singh Nagar district, of Punjab, India
- Shaheed Bhagat Singh Seva Dal, a non-governmental organisation in Delhi, India
