= Jas Kalra =

Indian social worker and president of The Earth Saviours Foundation

- Born: 22 August 1999 (age 27)
- Education: Shikshantar School, Gurugram; University of Melbourne
- Occupation: Social worker

Jas Kalra (born 22 August 1999) is an Indian social worker and humanitarian leader. He is the President of The Earth Saviours Foundation (TESF).

== Early life and education ==
Jas Kalra was born on 22 August 1999 in India. He completed his schooling at Shikshantar School, Gurugram

== Career ==
Kalra assumed leadership of The Earth Saviours Foundation following the passing of its founder.

== Awards ==
• National Icon Award 2024

== See also ==
- Non-governmental organisations in India
