= Eliana Riggio =

Eliana Riggio, also known as Eliana Riggio Chaudhuri, is an Italian UN official, humanitarian and author. She worked for UNICEF in India for ten years, coordinating field projects in urban areas, helping to develop city plans which focused on basic services for children and women. She is currently the coordinator of the International Child Friendly Cities Secretariat at the UNICEF Innocenti Research Centre in Florence. She has also served as a consultant to the Italian government on children's rights. She is also the President of the Italian branch of Child In Need India (CINI), a humanitarian organisation founded by her husband, pediatrician Samir Chaudhuri.

She has her background from development studies and city and regional planning.

== Publications ==
- Eliana Riggio Chaudhuri, Planning With The Poor: The Non-violent Experiment of Danilo Dolci in Sicily, Gandhi Peace Foundation, New Delhi, 1998, ISBN 81-85411-17-4
