= Deepalaya =

Deepalaya's logo

Deepalaya is an Indian non-governmental organization that aids the development of the urban and rural poor in India, with a focus on children. Founded in 1979, it is headquartered in Delhi. Deepalaya primarily serves the urban slums of Delhi, but also works on rural development in the states of Haryana and Uttarakhand. Deepalaya's focus is on sparking sustainable development from within a community.

From 2009–2010, 23.18% of Deepalaya's total income came from donations and 52.37% from government grants. HSBC India also supports Deepalaya through donations and voluntary works. Deepalaya experienced US$236,741.42 in deficit for this period.

== History ==
From 1977 to 1979, three of the seven founding members met regularly, discussing how to launch a programme of education and reaching out to the poor, and this idea motivated them to start "Deepalaya", a Delhi based NGO, working on issues affecting the urban and rural poor, with a special focus on women and children. They were T. K. Mathew, Y. Chackochan, and P. J. Thomas. They were later joined by Grace Thomas, C. M. Mathai, Punnoose Thomas and T. M. Abraham. They started the "Deepalaya Education Society", as they felt as registered society it will be helpful to run a school or buy a land and opened the first school on 16 July 1979 in a rented house in Chittaranjan Park in South Delhi. Later to share the rent of the school, one of the founders, Mr. Y Chakochan, moved into the school premises with his family. The school had five children, two teachers and an investment of Rupees 17,500 from the seven founding members who also took the responsibility of providing basic facilities like transport and material. In these initial days the school focused on pre-school education and charged a nominal fee of Rs 30 to meet its operational costs and a rickshaw-puller, an ayah, and two teachers were the school's initial staff.

By 1985, the number of students had increased to 133 with seven staff members. As the annual budget grew, Deepalaya started focusing on to primary education. During this time, the organization gained access to both national and international funding, increasing its resource base.

Deepalaya started reaching out to a larger number of slum dwellers through education, health, income generation as well as community development, thus stepping beyond mere education to ‘integrated development’. By 1992, Deepalaya was servicing 13,000 students and had 400 staff members.

According to Deepalaya's publication Yatra – The Institutional Memory, the core belief of the organisation in the success of community empowerment and building of self-reliance became crystallised into fundamental developmental paradigms in the organisation's phase of consolidation in the 1990s. In 2000, Deepalaya was servicing over 35,000 children, their families and communities.

Since 2002, Deepalaya become an international organisation with offices in the United States, the United Kingdom and Germany. In 2003, Deepalaya was appointed one of the NGOs for capacity building of smaller NGOs by REACH India. With organisation's presence growing globally steadily since year 2000,21 students from the organization went to The United States as part of CCI Project and around 20 students have come back after completing their education to serve the organisation in various capacities and return to their communities what they have earned.

By 2005, Deepalaya had become the largest operational NGO in Delhi, with a staff of 321 spread over 11 locations, main areas of influence being the urban slums of Delhi, providing services to 50,000 children in 76 slums and total of 400 villages out of which 84 villages in Mewat and seven villages in Uttarakhand and later expanding to some villages of Haryana and Uttar Pradesh.

In year 2016,Nikon India, had donated a bus, school desks and water filters to underprivileged children of the organisation. Strengthening its partnership with foundation and as part of its CSR initiative the company had increased its efforts to aid the education, transport and health needs of the student community and donated two water filters for safe drinking water and another school bus for safe and sure means of transport in the second phase.

The organisation had also set up a revolving corpus fund has to provide loan scholarships to support meritorious children interested in pursuing professional courses and the loan amount will be repayable with nominal interest over a scheduled period after a student is employed.

Currently, Deepalaya is an ISO 9001:2008 certified non – government organisation that believes in enabling self reliance and is committed to working on issues affecting the urban and rural poor, with a special focus on women and children and over the years, it has established several projects in the areas of Education (Formal/Non-Formal/Remedial), Women Empowerment (reproductive health, SHG, Micro-finance), Institutional care, Community health, Vocational training and Differently Abled and these projects are operational in Delhi, Haryana, Uttar Pradesh and Uttarakhand and till 2014 Deepalaya had reached out to more than 2,70,000 children, given vocational training to 9,700 adults and helped for more than 1,000 Self Help Groups with 11,000 women who have together saved Rs.408 million with a community revolving fund of Rs.1053 million and efforts of organisation for social transformation is growing with each year.

== Gender equity ==
Deepalaya has started a Gender Equity Program that provides educational opportunities to underprivileged girls, Deepalaya created the Education for Girls Project (RDDEFG) in September 2009. RDDEFG is supported by the Robert Duvall Children's Fund.The project aims to provide girls with education opportunities by supporting them financially though the informal earlier stage of education, till they enter formal education after achieving certain education standard, "education is free thereafter" in the government school (deepalaya).

== Education ==
Deepayala's flagship program Education strives to improve the literacy rate in India. Deepalaya has built 337 educational institutions where 50,000 receivers are educated via formal and non-formal education. In the year 2018, Deepalaya School Gusbethi had inaugurated construction of a new school building with the generous help of its corporate partners and plans to make more progress in its fight against illiteracy and meet the community demands in one of the most backward areas of rural Haryana. The school to be built on 90,000 sq. ft had received the grant from Oriflame, one of its oldest and most significant corporate partners and the construction will be completed in next 3 to 5 years.

Through the joint assignment, Education for Girls, it prompts fathers to protect their daughters’ rights and put them through schools and promotes girl's education while maintaining 1:1 boy-to-girl ratio in their schools. In year 2017,Oriflame India, a subsidiary of Swedish cosmetics major had sponsored education for 1000 girls and also donated two buses for the students of Deepalaya for smooth conveyance and distant travel and the initiative also marked the beginning of celebratory year for the company as it completed 50 years globally. The company had also promised monetary support as part of its continuous support starting from year 2006 and encourage individuals to dream and transform them into reality.

Deepalaya currently operates two schools. One is located in the Kalkaji extension area of Delhi and caters to slum children and the other one is situated 30 km away from Gurugram, in village Gusbethi in Nuh district of Haryana. Currently, Nuh is educationally the most backward districts in the country and Gusbethi is the most backward part of Nuh and hence the school is playing vital role in the transformation of local culture.

In year 2014, Amway Opportunity Foundation (AOF), the corporate social responsibility arm of Amway India, organised a special event for the students of Deepalaya School, New Delhi, to celebrate the AOF day and the event commenced with students of Deepalaya performing a cultural program and later followed by a painting competition and a puppet show and this made the children feel overjoyed to participate in all the competitions and they took part with full enthusiasm. It was also pledged during the event by the members of AOF along with students of Deepalaya to end child malnutrition across the globe by providing their colourful handprints to the global mural, as a part of the “Power of 5 Campaign”, an initiative undertaken to address the issue of malnourishment amongst kids, especially those below 5 years of age and for every colourful handprint, Amway will donate US$1 up to a total of US $400,000 to CARE International towards the support of underprivileged children and through this initiative AOF also planned to break the Guinness World record of the maximum handprints from any country which at that year stood at 30,000. The association of both organisations started since 2009 and AOF sponsors annual education of 22 students of and organizes health check-ups for over 350 students of Deepalaya every year.

Innovative methodology for education of children at risk aims to toughen formal and transitional schooling programmes.

== Health ==
Deepalaya has entered into Healthcare in 1986 and the organisation has "Mobile Health Units" that visits households, educate them about diseases such as AIDS, and provide health care services at doorsteps.

Deepalaya is involved in two health projects, A.P Dewan clinic and the Kalkaji Extension. The A.P Dewan clinic is funded by the Dewan Foundation Ltd. The clinic has served more than 7,000 patients to date (MBA Article Index). With pre-natal and post-natal treatments provided, Deepalaya has also brought down significantly the cases of abortion and infant death.

The organisation also runs a 22 bed mini-hospital in Gusbethi in Haryana with secondary services in Institutional Delivery and Cataract operations and also menstrual health education to around 10,000 female children.

Deepalaya Special Unit in Sanjay Colony is equipped with learning tools and different toys for disabled children to engage in. There are special educators, speech therapists, physiotherapists, community mobilizers and occupational therapists.

== Awards and recognition ==
- Sat Paul Mittal Appreciation Award 2018 in the “Institution” Category.
- Delhi NGO Leadership Award.
- Guidestar India NGO Transparency Award.
- Global CSR Leadership Award by ABP news.
- Best NGO Award from Indo-American Chamber of Commerce.
- Indian Excellence Awards by APAC Insider.

== See also ==
- Non-governmental organization
- Indian NGOs
