= The Gambia–India relations =

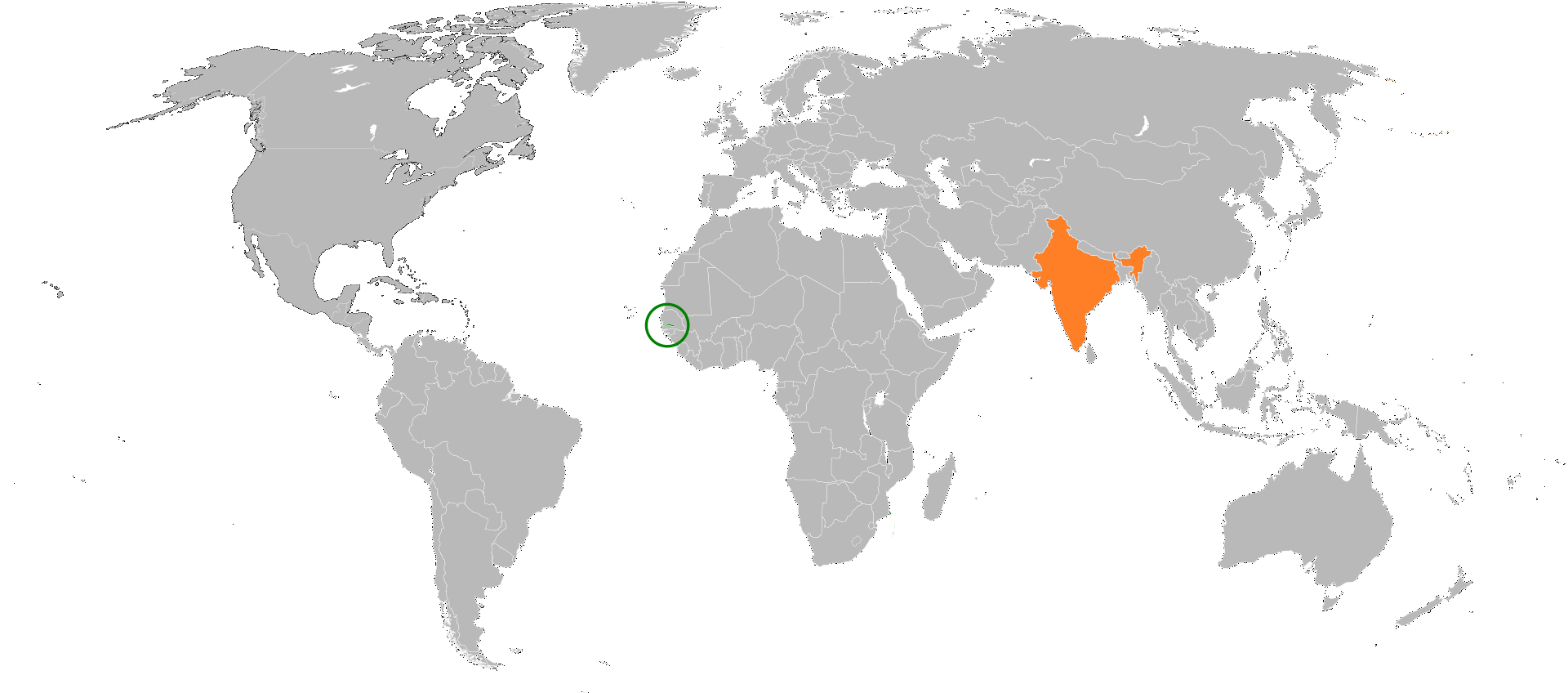
- Gambia: India

The Gambia–India relations refers to the international relations that exist between The Gambia and India. The Gambia maintains a High Commission in New Delhi. The Embassy of India in Dakar, Senegal is concurrently accredited to The Gambia, the only Anglophone country accredited to that mission. India also maintains an Honorary Consulate General in Banjul.

== History ==
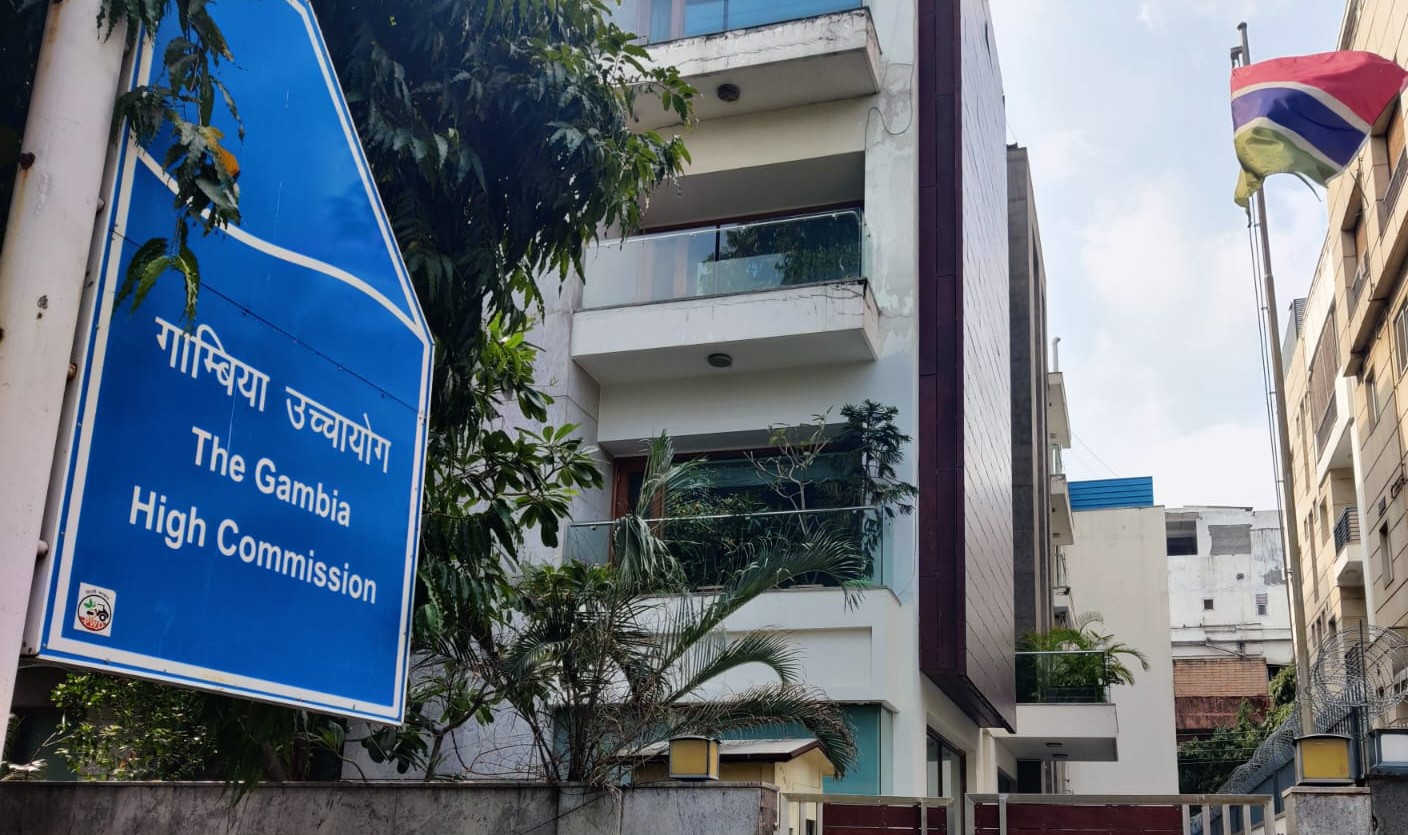
High Commission of The Gambia in New Delhi

Relations between The Gambia and India were very limited until 1985, consisting only of a confirmation of their common non-aligned principles, and common position on decolonisation and North-South issues. Prior to 1985, The Gambia maintained limited diplomatic ties with Asian countries, primarily focusing on countries such as Taiwan, China, South Korea and North Korea, from which it sought aid in exchange for political support.

The Gambia co-sponsored a resolution moved by India at the UN General Assembly in January 2015, to declare 21 June as International Yoga Day.

Minister of State for Parliamentary Affairs Mukhtar Abbas Naqvi visited The Gambia in September 2015 as the Prime Minister's Special Envoy and officially invited the country to participate in the third India Africa Forum Summit (IAFS). Gambian Vice President Isatou Njie-Saidy led the country's delegation to participate in the IAFS in New Delhi on 26–29 October 2015. Addressing the IAFS delegates, Njie-Saidy described India as a "genuine friend" and "brotherly country", and described its contribution to sustainable development in Gambia and Africa as "remarkable". She praised the bilateral co-operation between the two countries calling it "a flourishing partnership that remained a strong strategic mutual benefit to both sides". Njie-Saidy stated, "The Gambia and India have common interest in international affairs and sometimes share common points of view on international issues. The level of cooperation between Gambia and India at the international scene is very much encouraging especially at the level of the United Nations." She added that The Gambia continues to "enjoy immense support and assistance" from the Indian government, and that India's intervention in Africa had led to national development and improvements in the lives of the African people. Njie-Saidy also held closed door bilateral talks with Prime Minister Narendra Modi at Hyderabad House on 30 October.

Gambian Health and Social Welfare minister Omar Sey visited India in November 2015 and participated in the 2015 India-Africa Business forum. Addressing the forum, Sey stated that Indian "multinational pharmaceuticals and biotechnological companies have for decades revolutionized healthcare accessibility and affordability in Africa".

== Trade ==
India is The Gambia's third largest trading partner, after China and Senegal. India is the second largest destination for The Gambia's exports, and fourth largest source of its imports. Bilateral trade between The Gambia and India totaled US$90.90 million in 2015–16, declining by 17.08% from the previous fiscal year. India exported $59.54 million worth of goods to The Gambia, and imported $31.35 million. The main commodities exported by India to The Gambia are cotton yarn, fabrics and made-ups, cosmetics, toiletries, drugs and pharmaceuticals, and semi-finished iron and steel products. The major commodities imported by India from The Gambia are raw cashew and cotton.

Gambian Minister of Trade and Industry Addoulie Jobe led a 3-member delegation to participate in 4th India-Africa Trade Ministers’ Meeting in New Delhi on 23 October 2015. The Embassy of India in Dakar, in partnership with The Gambia Chamber of Commerce and Industry (GCCI), organized an India-Gambia Business Forum themed “Doing Business with India” in Banjul on 14 October 2016.

India provides The Gambia with unilateral duty-free tariff preferential (DFTP) market access for export of select goods.

== Foreign aid ==
The Pan-African e-Network project was implemented in The Gambia by Telecommunications Consultants India Limited (TCIL). An Indian NGO completed a solar electrification project in the Gambian villages of Kankurang and Kafenkeng in September 2007.

India provided The Gambia with two concessionary lines of credit worth $6.7 million for a tractor assembly plant project and $10 million for the construction of the National Assembly Building complex. India approved a total amount of $16.88 million as credit for completion of National Assembly. The new National Assembly was officially inaugurated by Gambian President Yahya Jammeh, who also announced that he would seek funding from India to expand the Banjul port. Two lines of credit of $22.5 million each were extended in July 2014 for two projects in the Greater Banjul Area – an electricity project, and the replacement of asbestos water pipes with UPVC pipes.

India provided a line of credit worth $92 million in April 2015 for the expansion of Banjul port, and $10 million to the Gambia Rural Electrification Extension Project. The Banjul port increased its berth space for ships, added a container terminal, acquired cargo handling equipment and completed computerization. Two Indian surgeons from BLK Hospital visited Banjul in September 2016 to assist in the development of healthcare delivery. Indian firm Shapoorji Pallonji Mideast was awarded a contract in October 2016 to construct the University of the Gambia (UTG) Faraba campus in Banjul at a cost of $53.46 million. India provided a grant of $500,000 to The Gambia to procure medical and educational equipment.

The National Small Industries Corporation (NSIC) of India agreed to establish a Vocational Training Centre in The Gambia to provide skill training in fields such as plumbing, welding, electrical work, the construction industry, carpentry, draftsman-ship, survey, plastic technology, ICT, agro and food processing, and gemstones cutting and polishing.

Citizens of The Gambia are eligible for scholarships under the Indian Technical and Economic Cooperation Programme and the Indian Council for Cultural Relations. Gambians often visit India to seek medical treatment. Fourteen-year old Gambian youth footballer Bubacarr Chatty received treatment for tuberculosis at the Pericardiatecony Hospital in Delhi in July 2011. Upon his return to The Gambia, he was welcomed by Vice President and Minister of Women Affairs Isatou Njie-Saidy, who praised the generosity of the Indian people. Gambia Football Association Secretary General Jammeh E.K. Bojang stated, "We can’t give words to express our happiness to the Gambian government and the Indian people for saving the life of a footballer who has the talent to be like Samuel Eto'o and Didier Drogba in the near future."

Recently the Vice President of Gambia Muhammad Jallow addressed the India African Conclave in Delhi renewing and reaffirming cooperation & also appreciating India's dedication to advancing innovation and entrepreneurship in Gambia calling it inspiring.

== Indians in The Gambia ==
As of 2023, around 3000 Indian citizens reside in The Gambia. They are primarily involved in trading and private businesses including the construction sector.

== Gambians in India ==
There are more than 700 Gambian students studying in India across various Universities. Recently, His Excellency, Mustapha Jawara, High Commissioner of The Gambia to India signed an MoU with Yenepoya University in Mangalore where 28 Gambian nationals will be studying.

== See also ==
- Foreign relations of the Gambia
- Foreign relations of India
