= Yenepoya University =

Educational institution in Mangalore, Karnataka, India

- Motto: Rabbi Zidni Ilma
- Motto in English: O Lord! Increase me in knowledge
- Type: Deemed university
- Established: 2008
- Affiliations: UGC
- Chairman: Dr. Yenepoya Abdullah Kunhi
- Chancellor: Farhaad Yenepoya
- Vice-Chancellor: Dr. K. S Gangadhara Somayaji
- Students: 25000
- Location: Mangaluru, Karnataka, India
- Campus: 44 acres (Main Campus); Multiple
- Website: yenepoya.edu.in

Yenepoya University is a private deemed-to-be university in Deralakatte, Mangaluru, Karnataka, India. It was granted deemed-to-be university status by the University Grants Commission (UGC) in 2008. The university consists of several constituent institutions, the oldest of which is the Yenepoya Dental College, established in 1992.

The university comprises a range of constituent colleges offering programs in disciplines such as Medicine, Dentistry, Allied Health Sciences, Physiotherapy, Pharmacy, Nursing, Ayurveda, Homeopathy, Naturopathy, Engineering, and Arts, Science, Commerce, and Management.

Yenepoya (Deemed to be University) has been recognized by University Grants Commission, New Delhi, India under 3(A) of the UGC Act, 1956 and received NAAC Grade " A+".

Mr. Farhaad Yenepoya is the Pro-Chancellor of Yenepoya Group of Institutions.

== Yenepoya Medical College ==
Yenepoya Medical College is located at about 11 km from Mangalore City. The college was established in 1999. Post-graduate courses are being offered by the university since 2005. The M.B.B.S. (Bachelor of Medicine & Bachelor of Surgery) course lasts for about 4.5 years plus a one-year mandatory internship as per set standards of the National Medical Commission for India. The courses are mainly oriented for earning a degree.

Courses offered for MS/MD (PG medical courses):

- MD (General Medicine, Community Medicine, Paediatrics, Pathology, TB & Chest, Forensic Medicine and Toxicology, Pharmacology, Microbiology, Biochemistry)
- MS (OBG, Orthopaedics, General surgery, Ophthalmology, ENT)

== Yenepoya Dental College ==
The B.D.S. (Bachelor of Dental Surgery) course is offered by the Yenepoya Dental College as per norms laid out by Dental Council of India.

MDS (Master of Dental Surgery) courses are three years. The examinations and awarding of degrees are regulated by Yenepoya University.

== Rankings ==
University and College rankings

General – India
- NIRF (Overall) (2023): 101-150
- NIRF (Universities) (2023): 85

The university was ranked 85 among universities in India by the National Institutional Ranking Framework (NIRF) in 2023 and in the 101–150 band overall.

== Notable alumni ==
- Kiran Singh Rajpurohit – Cybersecurity and IoT researcher, President of OWASP, and Managing Director of TraceX Labs.
- Edmond Fernandes – Public health physician and UN consultant who founded the CHD Group.

== Strategic MoUs ==
The university from time to time engages in strategic MoUs for furthering higher education prospects.

In May 2024, the university signed a strategic educational and healthcare diplomacy MoU with the High Commission of the Republic of the Gambia in India.

== Sports ==
Yenepoya University has participated in inter-university sports competitions. In January 2026, the university's football team emerged champions in the Association of Indian Universities (AIU) South-East Zone Inter-University Football Championship held in Hyderabad, thereby qualifying for the All India Inter-University Football Championship to be held in Kolkata.
