= Rita Panicker =

Indian social worker and writer

Rita Panicker Pinto
- Born: India
- Occupations: Social worker, Writer
- Years active: 1989–present
- Notable work: Work on child rights and protection

Rita Panicker Pinto is an Indian social worker and writer. She is the founder and director of Butterflies India.

== Early life and career ==
Panicker studied English literature at Fatima Matha College, Kollam. In 1976, she completed a master's degree in Social Welfare Administration from the Tata Institute of Social Sciences (TISS), Mumbai. She later obtained a master's degree in Development Studies from the Institute of Social Studies, The Hague, Netherlands, in 1982.

She worked as a faculty member in the Women's Studies Unit at TISS, Mumbai. She also founded MASHAL – Maharashtra Association for Social Housing.

Between 1988 and 1992, she served as director at the board of ChildHope.

In 1990, she worked as a consultant with UNICEF in New York and Nigeria on programmes related to children in difficult circumstances.

She also served as vice chair of the board of Family for Every Child.

== Work with street and working children ==
Panicker began working with children living on the streets while she was in Mumbai and teaching at the Tata Institute of Social Sciences. She later moved to Delhi and continued this work.

In 1988, she co-authored a report on street and working children in Delhi for UNICEF. This study examined the conditions of such children and the reasons for their situation.

She later founded Butterflies, an organisation working on child rights and protection.

== Personal life ==
Panicker is from Kollam, Kerala. She was born to Achutan Kunjukrishna Panicker and G. Rugmini Panicker. Her husband, Gerry Pinto, worked as a programme officer at UNICEF.

== Awards and recognition ==
- International Cooperative Innovation Award (2020)
- Lifetime Achievement Award (2016) by the National Association of Professional Social Workers in India
- Vanitha Woman of the Year (2012) by the Malayala Manorama group
- IGSSS Shrestha Puraskar (2011) by the Indo Global Social Service Society

== Books ==
- Co-authored Children and Crime in India: Causes, Narratives and Interventions (Palgrave Macmillan)
- Co-authored studies on street and working children and child rights issues
