= SERUDS =

Indian not-for-profit organization

SERUDS INDIA - Sai Educational Rural & Urban Development Society
- Formation: 2003
- Type: Not for profit
- Location: Kurnool, Andhra Pradesh, India
- Region served: India
- Website: www.serudsindia.org

Sai Educational Rural & Urban Development Society (SERUDS) is a voluntary and not for profit organization in India. It is a Non-Governmental Organisation serving disadvantaged children, elderly, women and youth in Kurnool district, Andhra Pradesh, India. SERUDS raises funds and contributions from individuals and organizations across India and the world and then uses these donations to serve the needs of deprived children, economically disadvantaged women, youth empowerment and hapless elderly people.

SERUDS NGO India is listed in GiveIndia, Give2asia, Joy of Giving, Give foundation, Global giving, Samhita, Credibility Alliance, God Parents Foundation, Vaniindia, Guidestar India websites as an NGO for its commitment for working in rural and urban slums for last eight years in upliftment of the society.

SERUDS is registered under societies registration act of 1860, registered under FCRA under Ministry of Home affairs, Income tax act for income tax exemption with Government of India.

== History ==
SERUDS NGO was conceived in 2003 by Mallikarjuna.G, an Engineering graduate from a prestigious engineering college in India, who was inspired at the age of 24 to start SERUDS to serve the society. Today SERUDS is growing and serving the needs in five districts of Andhra Pradesh, apart from other Indian states. It is run and managed by a team of like-minded professionals. SERUDS aims to work for the holistic development of the poor, and it has compassion for the suffering of deprived and downtrodden sectors of society.

SERUDS India is supported by SERUDS Inc., a 501(c)3 public charity in Land O^{'} Lakes, Florida, USA.

== Vision ==
Distribute the Fruits of Development to all the Sections of the Society.

== Ongoing initiatives ==
Nutritious mid day meals to the hapless elderly, destitute and poor people.

Running a Charitable Old Age home for destitute elderly women since 2012. It shelters about 30 old women

Four day care centres with play items and mid day meals for children up to six years old of working mothers in hazardous jobs.

Skill development including Fashion Design training to the Economically disadvantaged Women.

Running a Children's orphanage.

Distribution of Educational Material, text and notebooks, Uniforms to the economically disadvantaged poor students in the Government High Schools.

Sponsorship of school fee and other needs to the bright students belonging to poor families.
