= Samir Chaudhuri =

Indian pediatrician and humanitarian

- Occupations: Pediatrician and humanitarian
- Known for: Founder and director of CINI
- Spouse: Eliana Riggio
- Awards: World of Children Health Award (2007); Ellis Island Medal of Honor Global Humanitarian Award (2008)

Samir Chaudhuri is an Indian pediatrician and humanitarian. He is the founder (1974) and director of the Child In Need Institute (CINI), also known as Child In Need India, an organisation that works to facilitate sustainable development in health, nutrition, education and protection of children, adolescents and women in need, and President of its international arm, CINI International.

Chaudhuri graduated as a physician from the University of Rangoon in 1961, and subsequently trained as a pediatrician, specialising in child nutrition, at the All India Institute of Medical Sciences, New Delhi in 1970. He has served as a consultant to international and UN agencies, advising on emergency relief, health and nutrition programmes for women and children in many countries of Africa and Asia.

He has been President of the Voluntary Health Association of India.

Chaudhuri is married to Eliana Riggio and divides his time between India and Italy.

== Awards ==
He received the Italian Parliament's Commission for Infants Award in 2005.

In 2007, he was awarded the World of Children Health Award

He was awarded the Ellis Island Medal of Honor Global Humanitarian Award in 2008. In 2013, ABP Ananda felicitated Chaudhuri with "Sera Bangali Award" for his commitment and work towards social development.
