= Mobile nurseries =

Mobile Crèches or Mobile Nurseries and Mumbai Mobile Creches are Indian NGO founded to address a widespread lack of access to education and healthcare that children on construction sites face. "Mobile Crèche" was established in 1969 by its founder Meera Mahadevan when she witnessed the plight of “neglected children... at the site of the Gandhi Centenary Exhibition, in Delhi". Mahadevan strongly believed that with parents away at work, “young children suffer neglect” while “older ones bear the responsibility of adult chores”, resulting in a situation where the basic needs of migrant children remained unmet, hampering the essentials for the growth of the older sibling as well, like education .

In 1972 Mumbai Mobile Creches (MMC) was established in Mumbai, India as a branch of Mobile Creches, Delhi. For administrative simplicity MMC established itself as an independent legal entity in 2007. With a mission of ensuring that every child living on a construction site is happy, healthy and educated both Mobile Crèches, Delhi and Mumbai Mobile Creches have since then expanded their operations. Mobile Creches, Delhi now operates 44 day care centres and currently serves almost 14000 children a year at construction sites across Delhi, Noida (Uttar Pradesh) and Gurgaon (Haryana). Mumbai Mobile Creches now operates 29 centres and reaches over 4,500 children a year at construction sites across Mumbai, Navi Mumbai, and Thane. Both MMC and Mobile Creches, Delhi have grown beyond their original mission of providing childcare services. Mobile Creches, Delhi has begun building "platforms for lobbying for rights of all young children from the economically and socially excluded communities".With an expertise of over 45 years Mobile Creches, Delhi has been recognized by the government as a technical resource in the field of early Child care and development. To date, Mobile Crèches has reached out to 650,000 children, trained 6000 childcare workers and run 600 daycare centres. MMC also works to advocate for marginalized communities by providing vocational training for women and youth and promoting migrant families’ rights, access to healthcare, and government services. MMC has reached over 150,000 children and run over 240 daycare centres.

== Mobile Crèches’ and MMC's Initiatives and Programs ==
In the area of nutrition and healthcare, because children suffer from malnourishment and are exposed to poor hygiene are in a vulnerable condition. Among other major issues, everyday ailments, diseases such as diarrhoea, respiratory diseases, boils and worms, both MMC and Mobile Crèches have implemented a healthcare programme consisting of prevention, cure and rehabilitation to improve the health of the children at its centers.

For instance, because the first 2 years of the child’s admittance to a centre is critical to keeping malnutrition at bay, nutritional meals and snacks are prepared by the teachers and provided at the centres throughout the day. Other initiatives include raising awareness of breastfeeding, directing families to immunization, monitoring children/mothers’ with weekly doctor visits, and having referrals for eye care, dental treatment, and other ailments. To date, Mobile Crèches has conducted health checkups on 5705 children and immunized 3889 children for BCG, measles, DPT, DT and TT. In 2011-2012, MMC facilitated the vaccination of 5871 children for pulse polio, Triple Polio, BCG, measles, DPT, and Tetnus. Additionally, MMC ran 13 health camps providing 1336 people living on construction sites with eye checks and basic medical attention.

In the area of education, both MMC and Mobile Crèches believe that in order to equip the child for life, learning should start at birth and continue through pre-school and formal schooling. More importantly, they view formal education as the long-term solution to escaping the cycle of poverty by providing children with better earning opportunities and thus, both organisations remain steadfast in helping children get into municipal schools and stay in them.

As such, children at its childcare centres first undergo age appropriate learning where interactive play such as songs, games, puppets and stories aid social, cognitive, and motor development. Later, rudimentary forms of readings and math are also taught to prepare children for their transition into formal schooling. MMC works with children and their parents to support, both financially and academically, the enrollment of children into the municipal school system. Children from ages 6–14 continue attending the MMC centres for a half-day programme during which teachers support their formal school education. Both MMC and Mobile Crèches award monetary aid to its students, on a needs basis, in order to support the child’s enrollment fees and additional educational expenses.
