= Katha (NGO) =

- Industry: Publishing, community development, Child welfare, Education.
- Founded: 1988
- Founder: Geeta Dharmarajan
- Headquarters: Delhi, India
- Key people: Geeta Dharmarajan (President)
- Products: Books
- Number of employees: 132
- Website: www.katha.org

Katha is a registered non-profit and non-governmental organisation based in Delhi that works in the field of community development, child welfare, education and literature. It was founded by Geeta Dharmarajan in 1988. It connects grassroots work in education, urban resurgence and story. It calls itself a "profit for all" organisation that moves towards achieving social justice and curb poverty in urban India. It also runs KITES (Katha Information Technology and E-commerce School) a non-conventional school, which providing information and communication skills to 3000 children in slum area of Govindpuri, Delhi.

As a publisher Katha publishes books for children, which include stories from mostly Indian folklore and mythology, translating stories into English and Hindi from 21 regional Indian languages, and today is a leading name in translation genre in Indian publishing, and has "firmly put translation onto the Indian publishing agenda with the Katha Prize Stories Series"

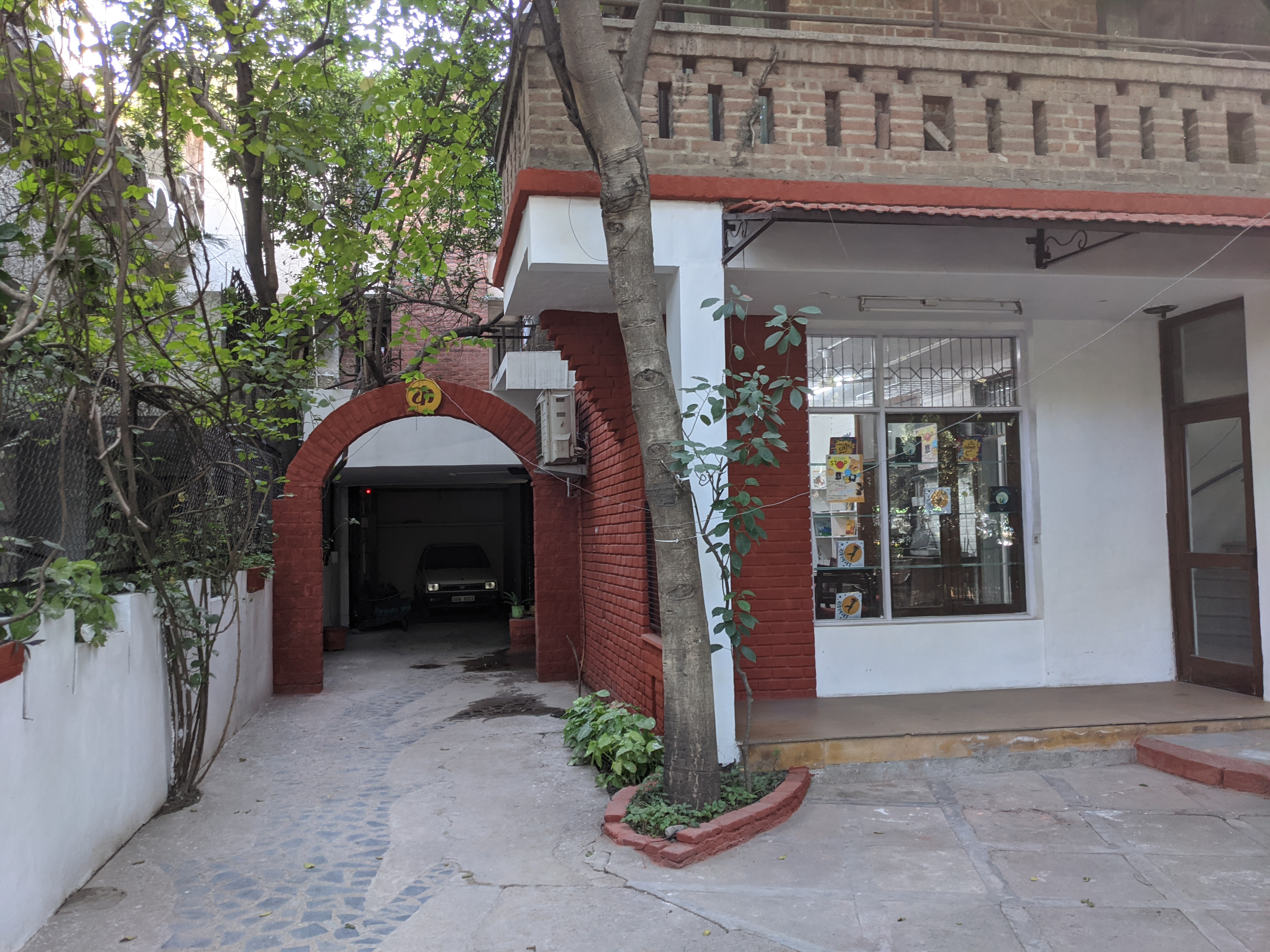
e:Katha Book Shop.

== Work ==
Katha has set up around 96 schools in Delhi and works with a large team of volunteer and intellectuals. Many of these schools are in urban slums, where over 7,000 underprivileged children gain access to education.

It executes stories in identity building of the children and believes that there is a need to tell stories from India in order to create a new generation of children that would have a strong sense of rooted-ness to their culture. This is Katha NGO's cultural resistance that is done through its publishing division Katha Books, that has been working in the area of translating Indian literature since 1989.

In 2001, it formed KITES (Katha Information Technology and E-commerce School) in Govindpuri, New Delhi, a non-conventional school, in a joint initiative with British telecom major British Telecom, providing information and communication skills to 3000 children from the poorest communities.

In March 2009, Katha which also runs several income generation programs for women, by training skills like cooking, baking, tailoring and teaching at its various community centres, gave away the `Dilli ki Shaan' (Pride of Delhi) Awards to 15 women community leaders; speaking on the occasion, the Chief Minister of Delhi, Sheila Dikshit said: "I think Katha is doing a better job than even the Delhi Government to bring under-privileged women to the forefront."

== See also ==
- Katha Books
