= CHD Group =

Indian Public Health Organization

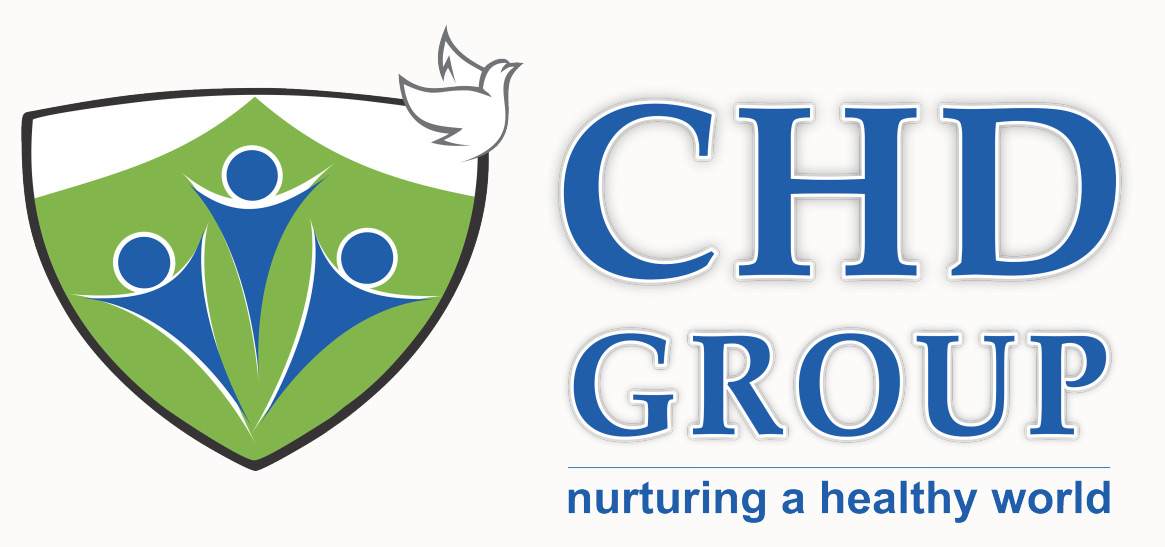
- Formation: 2014; 12 years ago
- Founders: Edmond Fernandes, Cynthia Fernandes
- Type: Health Organisation
- Legal status: Public charity
- Headquarters: Mangalore
- Origins: Mangalore
- Services: Public Health Initiatives; CSR Programme Implementation; Academic Co-operations; Monitoring and Evaluation; Consulting
- Fields: Public Health
- Affiliations: Non Partisan, Non Discriminatory
- Volunteers: 15500
- Award: ASSOCHAM NGO Award 2020, Businessworld Healthcare Award 2022
- Website: www.chdgroup.org

CHD Group is an Indian non-profit global health organisation headquartered in Mangalore. Founded on 27 June 2014, CHD Group works in the field of public health, disaster management, primary healthcare, road safety, women's health, skill development, monitoring and evaluation of programmes, implementing CSR programmes for corporate companies and livelihood for rural communities and partners with other Indian and foreign organisations, government ministries, diplomatic missions, United Nations agencies for capacity development, supportive supervision, technical support, CSR programme implementation and strengthening public health systems.

The organisation advocated for a more robust public health bill in 2017, and also released the Karnataka Mental Health Report that gave the landscape of mental health situation in the state.

During the COVID-19 pandemic, the NGO supported over 50,000 farmers by providing PPE in partnership with Corteva agriscience and also donated 50 oxygen concentrators to BBMP Hospitals by importing them from China totally impacting over 4,56,000 in the middle of a lockdown alone.

The organization received a Special Consultative Status to the United Nations Economic and Social Council (ECOSOC) in 2021 and was granted observership status to UNFCCC in 2022 and has impacted in total over 4 million lives in India alone in urban and rural areas.

== Academic & Research Institute ==
On 29 March 2022, CHD Group officially inaugurated & started the Edward & Cynthia Institute of Public Health (ECIPH). The Institute is named after the patrons Edward Fernandes and Cynthia Fernandes.

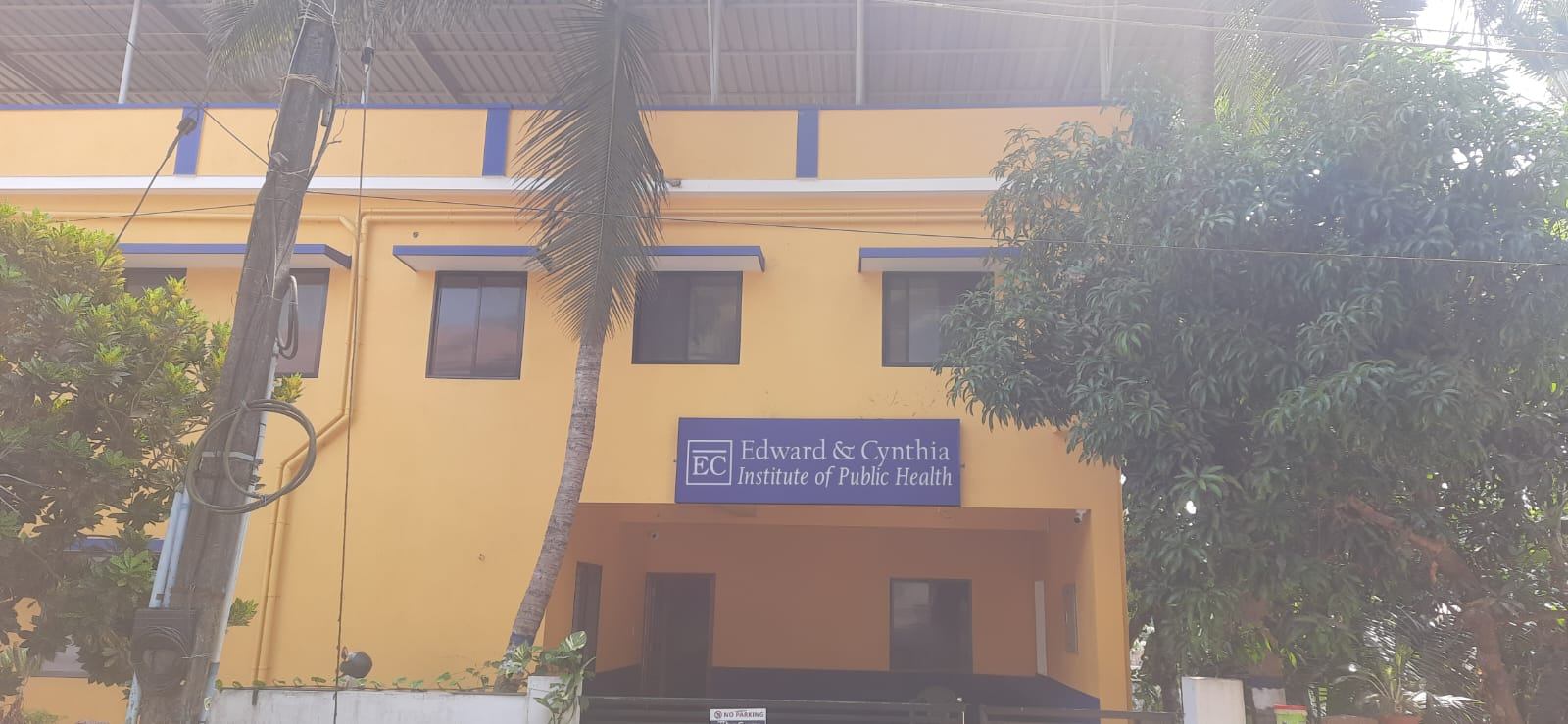
Edward & Cynthia Institute of Public Health at Mangalore

ECIPH is advanced technical cooperation center with Yenepoya (Deemed to be University) in Mangalore that provides training for a specialized higher education degree programme in Masters in Public Health (MPH).

== Advocacy and work reception ==
In the year 2014, CHD Group pressurized the District Administration of Dakshina Kannada to book violators for seat belt and enforce seat belt as a compulsion for drivers in the city of Mangalore and the district of Dakshina Kannada. To this effect, the Deputy Commissioner then, issued an order to implement seat belt for drivers with immediate effect.

CHD Group partnered with Godrej Industries to support families who were struck by disasters during Gujarat Floods 2017 and supported them through medical relief work.

In 2018, CHD Group led a US Government delegation to Chief Minister Kumaraswamy and also motivated him to set up a disaster management and nutrition task force in the state with sub-district governance mechanisms.

In the 2019 Karnataka Mental Health Report, the organization stated that Raichur had the highest cases of mental disorder followed by Bidar and proposed several solutions to the Government of Karnataka.

During Cyclone Fani 2019, they provided multi-specialty medical relief working with All India Institute of Medical Sciences, Bhubaneshwar, Odisha.

== Major Thematic Areas ==
- Health Systems Strengthening
- Climate Change and Human Health
- Disaster Risk Reduction & Humanitarian Emergencies
- Maternal and Child Nutrition
- Primary Health Care
- Road Safety
- Mental Health
- Non Communicable Diseases
- Urban Health
- Assisted Living and Geriatric Care
- Community resilience & social health concentrations

== Special past projects ==
CHD Group runs Mission ICU, a citizen- driven initiative to build critical care capacities of India's public hospitals. Until now they have installed over 200 plus beds and ventilators across 22 Government district hospitals of India, the latest being in Tamenglong, Manipur in India. The 200 bed installation was carried out at District Hospital, Champhai led by the Government of Mizoram.

The Family Pillar Alliance (FPK) was a programme run by CHD Group to provide sustainable livelihood in the domain of hospital duty assistants as caregivers for families in India.

== Empanelment, membership, signatory ==
Empaneled and registered with Niti Aayog, International Labour Organization, UNICEF, Foreign Contribution (Regulation) Act, 2010, Data Universal Numbering System, Income Tax

Signatory to the Fossil Fuels Non-Proliferation Treaty. Member of the Climate Action Network South Asia.

Observership to United Nations Framework Convention on Climate Change.

== Awards ==
In the year 2020, CHD Group won the ASSOCHAM NGO Award for speedy response to community needs.

BW Businessworld 40 under 40 award in 2021.

== Foundation Day themes ==
7th Foundation Day 2021 – " Reclaiming gains for accelerating global health " and the Keynote address was given by Yogan Pillay, Former Deputy Director General of Health, Government of South Africa.

8th Foundation Day 2022 – " Public health in all policies for community development" - His Excellency Mr. Federico Salas, Ambassador of Mexico to India delivered the Keynote address and Harsha Somaroo, President, Public Health Association of South Africa was the Guest of Honor.

9th Foundation Day 2023 – Health, Climate Change and Community Resilience - The world we want - Fatemeh Rezaei, Isfahan University of Medical Sciences, Iran was the Chief Guest.

10th Foundation Day 2024 - International Conference was held to mark 10 years of CHD Group by holding the ECIPH Dialogues on Reconstructing global health and social impact with Arthur L Frank delivering the keynote speech.

== Climate Negotiations with UNFCCC ==
COP28 - CHD Group led a 7 member delegation to discuss on health and climate concerns and also address the nexus of health, climate, agriculture, food security, war and implications on human health in Dubai, UAE.

COP29 - CHD Group led an 18-member multi-dimensional expert delegation from India, Azerbaijan, USA, Canada, Nigeria, Bangladesh, Kenya, UK, Uganda and Austria to Baku, Azerbaijan and also held various events at the Madagascar Country Pavilion, SHARE Hub and held other bilateral and multilateral meetings with senior world leaders and diplomats.

== Few Key Partners ==
- USAID
- Ministry of Road Transport and Highways, Government of India
- SBI Foundation
- NABARD
- UNICEF
- BASF
- Corteva Agriscience
- MRPL
- National Health Mission
- Yenepoya University
- Canara Bank
- UNFCCC
- UNECOSOC
