= Butterflies India =

Non-governmental organization in India

Butterflies
- Founded: 1989
- Founder: Rita Panicker Pinto
- Purpose: Children's Rights
- Location: New Delhi, India
- Method: Rights-based, participatory, non-institutional approach
- Employees: 140
- Website: butterfliesngo.org

Butterflies is a non-governmental organisation based in New Delhi, India, founded in 1989 by Rita Panicker. The organisation works with vulnerable children, particularly street children, using a rights-based and participatory approach to provide education and life skills.

== Genesis and principles ==
Butterflies was founded in 1989 by Rita Panicker, who continues to serve as its executive director. The organisation was established following her work with children living on the streets and railway platforms.

Prior to founding Butterflies, Panicker, along with P. Nangia, conducted a situational analysis study of street and working children in Delhi for UNICEF in 1988.

== Interventions ==
Butterflies have initiated a number of interventions with various government and non-government agencies. The main programmes are

- Education,
- Children's Development Khazana (life skills programme teaching financial management),
- Child Health Cooperative (CHC)
- Children's Media (Butterflies Broadcasting Children)
- Resilience Centre and Childline (1098, 24-hour helpline for children in crisis)
- Night Shelters for homeless children
- Vocational training (Butterflies School of Culinary and Catering and Computer Education)
- Chakhle Dilli catering service
- Advocacy and Research Centre (ARC)
- Alliance Building
- Right to Play and Child Social Protection Committee Programme.

In the year 2009, on a request by the Delhi High Court, Butterflies also ran a programme for children in conflict with law in an Observation Home for Boys in New Delhi.

Butterflies flagship programme is the Children's Development Khazana (CDK). It is an education programme on democratic values and financial management where children are also taught communication, gender equality and sensitivity and entrepreneurship. The main aim is to teach street children aged between 9 and 18 to be responsible in managing their finances, and they can be a member of Khazana, which is run by themselves under the guidance of adult. The children deposit whatever they earn and every one of them is also given a passbook. Every six months, member children elect a Child Volunteer Manager (CVM) and an Assistant Child Volunteer Manager (ACVM), and after voting, the elected CVM and ACVM undergo training on how to manage their respective CDK and are taught how to manage the Cash Book, Ledger Book and Pass Books of the members. For each implementing organization, the amount deposited by children in their CDK account is then deposited in a mainstream bank to a separate CDK account.

As of March 2018, CDK is operational in eight countries where it is working in collaboration with partner organisations (five in Asia, two in Africa) and in nine states and Union Territories of India (Jammu & Kashmir, Kerala, Delhi, Bihar, Jharkhand, Odisha, Rajasthan, Andaman & Nicobar Islands and Maharashtra) with a total membership of 16,912 children (8,981 boys and 7,923 girls) and savings amounting to $82,061.

Since 1995, Butterflies have also been running the Child Health Co-operative, for street children where they discuss their health problems and plan strategies to combat health problems. As of March 2018, CHC is operational in eight countries and in ten states of India with a total membership of 9,354 children (4,984 boys and 4,370 girls).

== Outreach ==
Through its Children's Cooperatives Programmes (CDK and CHC), Butterflies operates in eight countries, including Afghanistan, India, Nepal, Sri Lanka, Kyrgyzstan, Tajikistan, Madagascar and Ghana. In India, its programmes are active in several states and union territories, including Jammu and Kashmir, West Bengal, Kerala, Delhi, Bihar, Jharkhand, Odisha, Rajasthan, Andaman and Nicobar Islands and Maharashtra.

In 1998, Butterflies helped establish the Delhi Child Rights Club, a forum for children from various organisations in Delhi. The group has raised issues related to children's rights, including access to safe play spaces.

Butterflies has also supported networks such as the National Alliance of Grassroots NGOs for Protection of Child Rights (NAGN), which includes organisations from multiple Indian states. It is also associated with the South Asian Alliance of Grassroots NGOs (SAAGN), a regional network of civil society organisations.

Butterflies is a member of Family for Every Child, an international alliance of organisations working on child welfare. Rita Panicker, the organisation's executive director, has served as vice-chair of its board.

== Awards and recognition ==
- Recipient of the International Cooperative Innovation Award 2020 by the U.S. Overseas Cooperative Development Council
- Rita Panicker was awarded the Lifetime Achievement Award 2016 by the National Association of Professional Social Workers in India for her distinct contribution in the domain of child rights, especially street and working children at the 4th Indian Social Work Congress.
- Rita Panicker was honoured by Shri Amitabh Bachchan on the new Star Plus show Aaj Ki Raat Hai Zindagi in 2015
- Vanitha Woman of the Year 2012 by the Malayala Manorama group. The award was instituted to acknowledge the work done by Malayali women to serve Indian society
- IGSSS Shrestha Puraskar, 2011, by the Indo Global Social Service Society in New Delhi for Panicker's pioneering work with street and working children.
- Nominated and a finalist for the 2009 Right Livelihood Award.
- Awarded the Zee Pehal Pioneering Personalities L. N. Goel Award in 2006.
- Awarded the Women of Social Work Excellence by the Manava Seva Dharma Samvardhani Charitable Trust for Social Service Consciousness, Chennai, on 27 February 2002.
- Children's Development Khazana started by her organization Butterflies in 2001 received the Second Prize in the 2006 Global Development Network Award for the Most Innovative Development Project.
- The Ramachandran - Ikeda Award 1999 was conferred on Panicker's organization Butterflies
