= HOPE Charitable Trust =

Humanitarian organisation in Kerala, India

HOPE (Hold On Pain Ends) Charitable Trust
- Founded: 2014
- Founder: Mahesh Parameswaran Nair
- Type: Charitable trust
- Purpose: Environmentalism, health, ecology
- Location: Kerala, India
- Volunteers: 1500

HOPE (Hold On Pain Ends) Charitable Trust is a not for profit organization in Kerala that is engaged in humanitarian work and awareness programs for those in distress. The organization was founded in January 2014 by Mahesh Parameswaran Nair (an IT professional) who started with the support of family and friends. The organization later registered volunteers who collectively do a diverse range of social work. As reported in 2019, the organization had 1500 volunteers.

== Work and activities ==
The idea, which initially started through Facebook, has become an endeavour to serve the underserved and general society.

HOPE organizes blood donation camps, organ donation awareness camps, anti-narcotics awareness camps, and awareness camps on cancer care. They build homes for the poor, create rehabilitation and shelter homes, and rehabilitate people living on the streets or those who are disabled. They provide educational aid and give medical assistance such as donating wheelchairs and supporting people in old age with medicines, food, and provisions. They arrange funds for surgeries, help with organ donation, give marriage assistance, give financial assistance, and organize cleaning drives. In March 2019, the organization adopted the Attinkara colony (Beemapally) to help with drainage leaks, dilapidated houses, unpaved roads and lack of water supply. The organisation encouraged women empowerment by supporting small-scale businesses in the communities.

During the COVID-19 pandemic, HOPE launched the 'Back to Home' program and helped stranded people come back home, including nurses and students. The volunteers arranged for smartphones, laptops and internet connection for underprivileged students for uninterrupted education and sanitary pads for menstrual hygiene. A dress bank was set up by the organization to support with clothes. They also gave food and medicine related assistance. Prior to this, HOPE had helped those in need during the floods.

HOPE is now a family of volunteers including IT professionals, doctors, police officers, architects, MBA students, and various other college students.

== Awards ==
- Youth Icon Award from Dr Shashi Tharoor
- Nirbhaya Indian Icon Award
