= EVidyaloka =

eVidyaloka
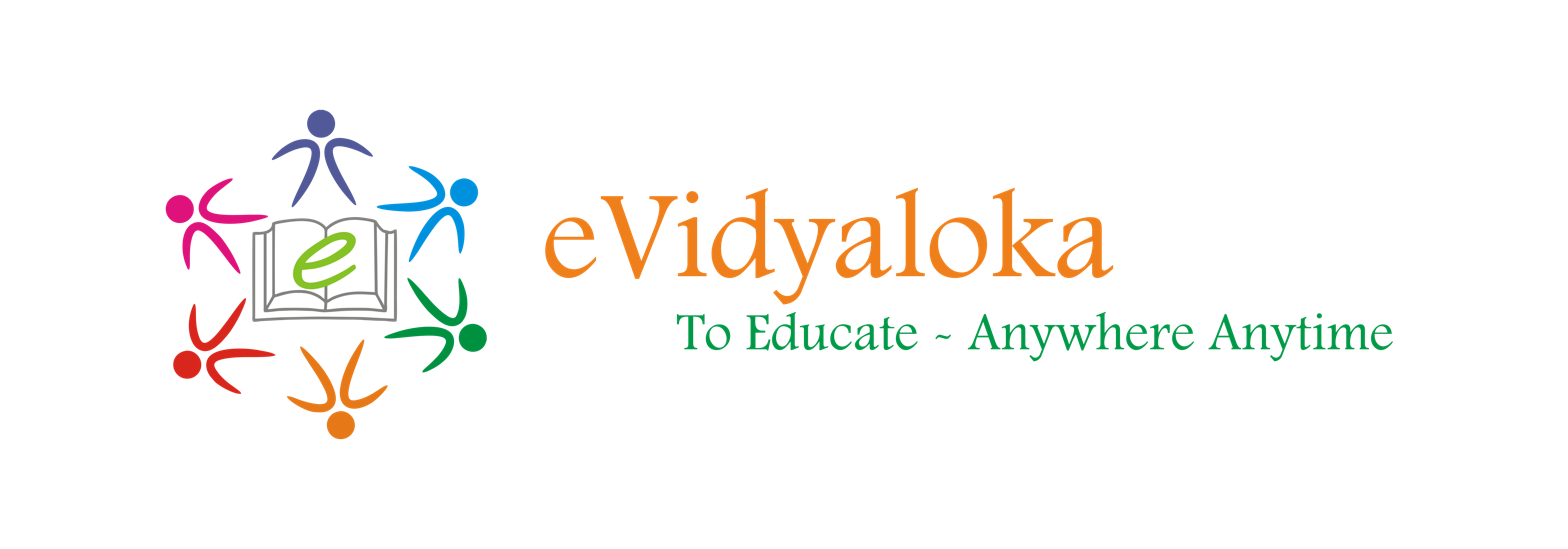
- eVidyaloka : To Educate ~ Anywhere Anytime

- HQ Location in Bengaluru Urban
- Formation: 28 January 2011; 15 years ago
- Founders: Satish Viswanathan; Venkataraman Sriraman
- Founded at: Bangalore
- Type: NGO
- VAT ID no.: AAATE4036C (PAN)
- Registration no.: DIT(E)BLR/12A/E-153/AAATE4036C/ITO(E)-1/Vol 2012-13
- Legal status: Trust
- Headquarters: Bengaluru
- Coordinates: 12°54′54.446″N 77°37′34.9″E
- Region served: India
- Methods: Computer Based Training
- Key people: Vishy Thiagarjan (Trustee); Ravichandran V (Trustee/Chairperson); V Ramkumar (Trustee); Brinda Poornapragna (CEO); Rizwan Tayabali (advisor); Vyjayanthi Sankar (advisor)
- Revenue: ₹15,363,840 (US$160,000) (2017)
- Expenses: ₹10,238,475 (US$110,000) (2017)
- Staff: 37 (2019)
- Volunteers: 1,100 + (Actively Teaching) (2019)
- Website: www.evidyaloka.org
- Remarks: To Educate ~ Anywhere Anytime

eVidyaloka is a Bangalore-based NGO that focuses on imparting education to students of Rural government schools in India by crowdsourcing volunteer teachers and connecting them to the rural government schools using the power of IT.

== About ==
As of Feb 2020, eVidyaloka is focused on teaching English, Math and Science subjects up to high school grade in Indian states of Andhra Pradesh, Jharkhand, Karnataka, Maharashtra, Tamil Nadu, Telangana, Bihar, Uttar Pradesh, Uttarakhand and West Bengal. Skype, Webex and Google Hangouts are preferred means of communication between teachers and students while Workplace by Facebook is used for internal communication. Skype, Webex and Google Hangouts are preferred means of communication between teachers and students while Workplace by Facebook is used for internal communication.

== Volunteer teachers ==
Volunteer teachers connect to the digital classroom in a rural government school and teach a subject for two hours a week (one hour each on two separate days) using video conferencing software. They range from retired persons and housewives to graduate students, PhD scholars and working professionals, and teach in the regional language spoken in the village where their assigned school is located.

== NGO Partners or non-governmental organization ==
The digital classrooms are set up in various remote rural locations in India with the support of NGOs that operate in those areas. They monitor the day-to-day operations of the digital classrooms and provide support to the school/ students as and when required. A person from the locality is recruited and trained in the basic usage of computers. This person is then employed to operate the digital classroom, thus acting as the extended arm of the teacher who appears on the screen. In effect, at least one employment is created with the setting up of each digital classroom, empowering the local community.

== See also ==
- E-learning (theory)
- Educational technology
- Distance education
