= Leaf Bank =

Environment Conservation Organization

- लीफ बैंक
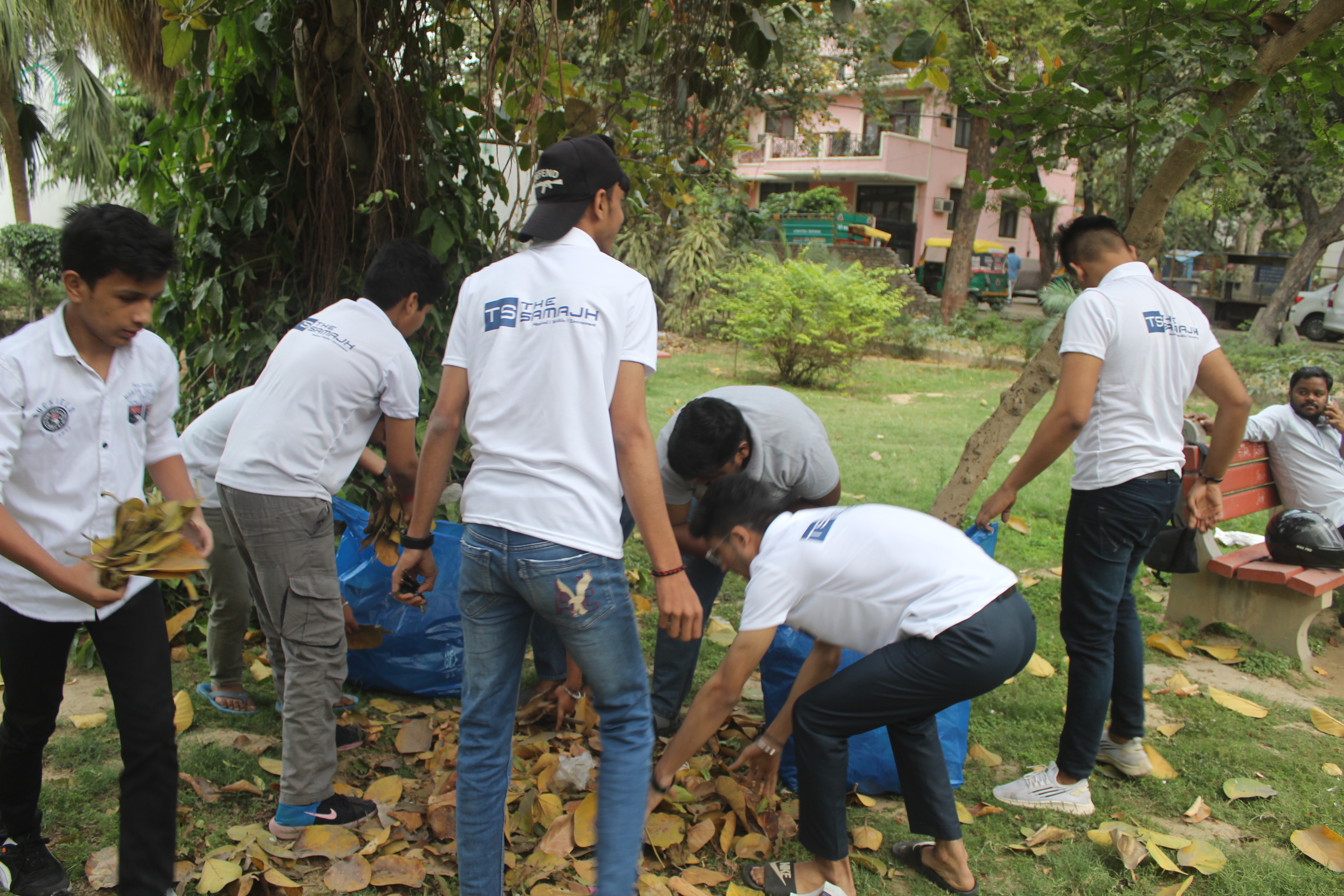
- Formation: 21 March 2023
- Founder: RJ Raawat
- Type: NGO
- Registration no.: DL/2019/0230403
- Purpose: Environment Conservation
- Headquarters: Delhi
- Location: New Delhi, India
- Coordinates: 28.579691°N 77.259850°E
- Official language: English, Hindi
- Main organ: Board Members
- Parent organization: The Samajh
- Volunteers: 150

Leaf Bank is a bank located in Delhi. People deposit the fallen dry leaves of the autumn season in the Delhi Leaf Bank, and receive compost from the next year as interest. People are also given certificates from this bank after depositing the leaves, by showing which people can get compost.

== Process ==
The leaves are collected in large quantities. These leaves are kept in polythene bags for a few days. After this, nitrogen is sprayed on these leaves from time to time. Slowly the leaves decompose and within a few months the compost is ready.
