= Indo Global Social Service Society =

Non-government organization based in India

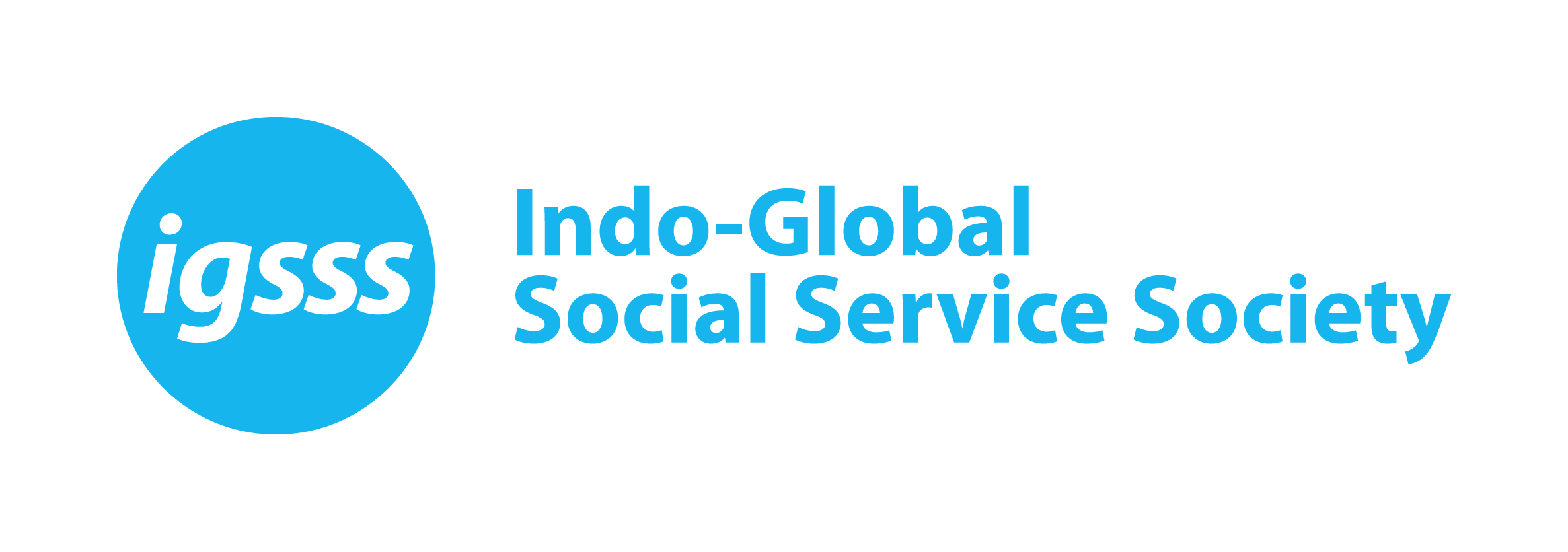
- Founded: 1960
- Type: Non-governmental organization
- Headquarters: New Delhi, India
- Location: India
- Key people: John Peter Nelson, Executive Director
- Website: igsss.org

The Indo-Global Social Service Society (IGSSS) is a non-government organization based in New Delhi, India. It works towards the development, capacity building and enlightenment of the vulnerable communities. The organisation is spread across 25 states and the National Capital Territory of Delhi in India. It is formerly known as Indo-German Social Service Society.

== History ==
It initially began its operations as Indo-German Social Service Society working with the funds received through MISEREOR, one of the largest relief operations of Roman Catholic Church in Germany. In 1981 it started to support projects in food production, health care and education, vocational training, employment, rural development.

The SMILE Programme (Student Mobilization Initiative for Learning through Exposure) was also started as a national program by IGSSS in 1985. By 1992, IGSSS expanded its presence from Delhi to pan India, opening regional offices. It moved from being a mere funding agency to development supporting organization with collaborations with other NGOs.

The organization's name had also evolved into the present Indo-Global Social Service Society to reflect the association with global donors.

== Organization Structure ==
IGSSS works on six core issues that include

- Sustainable Livelihood
- Urban Poverty Reduction
- Disaster Risk Reduction
- Gender Equity
- Youth Development
- Climate Change Adaption

== Awards and recognition ==
IGSSS had received multiple prestigious awards and accolades for its work and contribution to the development of the society which includes the Golden Peacock Award for Philanthropy in Emerging Economies in 2006.
