= Maitri Pune =

Organization

Maitri Pune is a non-governmental organisation based in Pune, India whose work includes helping tribals in the Melghat and Marathwada regions. Established in 1992, they have helped to lower the infant mortality rate, along with raising agricultural production and increasing AIDS awareness. In recent years they have expanded their reach to include natural disaster relief and a helpline for AIDS awareness which was receiving 1,500 calls a day as of 2009.
