= Sanjhi Sikhiya =

Education foundation in Punjab, India

Sanjhi Sikhiya is a non-profit organisation working to improve the public education system in Punjab, India. The organisation offers young leaders opportunities to work closely with the officials of the Punjab Education Department. Sanjhi Sikhiya is also part of the Punjab Education Collective—a group of four non-profits in the education space—whose work together has impacted "2.3 million students across 19,000 government schools in Punjab."

Sanjhi Sikhiya was co-founded by Simranpreet Singh Oberoi in 2018 with the mission to help "all children in Punjab attain foundational capabilities in an enabling environment."

== Initiatives ==
Sanjhi Sikhiya's flagship initiative includes the Punjab Youth Leadership Programme (PYLP), which is a two-year fellowship that trains and places young leaders in government-run schools in Punjab. The young leaders work with teachers to enhance classroom pedagogy and collaborate with bureaucrats to improve local governance.

The program runs in primary schools across three districts in Punjab: Fatehgarh Sahib, Patiala, and Ropar. By 2021, the program had placed young leaders in 300 schools across the state.

== Awards ==
Sanjhi Sikhiya is a member of the Punjab Education Collective (PEC) — a group of four non-profits working to improve education in the state. In 2023, the Schwab Foundation for Social Entrepreneurship (a sister organization of the World Economic Forum) awarded Punjab Education Collective with the Collective Social Innovation Award. The collective's efforts have contributed to improving Punjab's education ranking in the national performance grading index from, "13 in 2019 to number 1 in 2020/21".
