= Narayan Seva Sansthan =

Indian charity

- Founded: 1985
- Founder: Kailash Chandra Agarwal "Manav"
- Type: Not for profit
- Purpose: Social welfare
- Headquarters: Udaipur, Rajasthan, India
- Location: Udaipur
- Region served: India, US, UK, Canada, South Africa, Sydney, Bahrain, Antwerp, Botswana, Ontario, Congo, Dubai, Paris
- Key people: Prashant Agarwal
- Staff: More than 1000
- Website: www.narayanseva.org

Narayan Seva Sansthan is a non-profit charitable organisation based in Udaipur, Rajasthan, India. It is known for providing philanthropic services in the field of treatment and rehabilitation of polio affected people without discrimination of religion, region, caste, race, or gender. It was founded on 23 October 1985 by founder chairman Kailash Agarwal.

The NGO is helping underprivileged people and disabled community to uplift and bring them in mainstream society. The NGO is helping in diagnosing, treatment, and rehabilitation in 480 branches of India and 49 in other part of the world for disabilities and improving physical disabilities, and socio-economic rehabilitation issues.

== History ==
Narayan Seva Sansthan is operating two hospitals (800 beds and 300 beds each), 30 centers, 20 physiotherapy centers, and 49 branches abroad. They are preparing to emerge as a leading healthcare brand, that stands for 'service' and 'care'. The Sanstha is working in the field of rehabilitating disabled people from the underprivileged and weaker segments of society.

They are focused on alleviation of disabilities and providing proper physical, social, financial, and economic rehabilitation to them. The NGO is now setting up hospitals, physiotherapy centers, skill development centers for disabled persons, and artificial multiple limbs workshops in each city across the country under its brand to make them self dependant.

These services to the patient and his dependents will be offered free of charge. Additionally in alignment with the mission and objective of promotion of Narayan Seva Sansthan as a healthcare brand standing up for 'service' and 'cure', the NGO is working on two other ambitious initiatives, named "MyNeedHelp Project", where it is compiling social data with service giving organisations (e.g., on hospitals, ambulance services, Dharamshala, education, public transport and so on).

This data will then be fed on an app and will be supported by a call center to respond to commoner's queries on these issues in vernacular languages, which will be ready in a short time. The organisation is also creating a digital platform called punyapoint.org to recognise and award individuals and hidden people working on various social initiatives and aiming at giving them social recognition for their noble activities and encouraging and motivating others for such initiatives and will be also highlighted in various social media platforms.

In 2014, they started Diagnosis and Distribution Camps in Africa and later in India. They identified patients for OPD, diagnosed and measured patients for caliper and artificial limbs distribution. The NGO provided artificial limbs to the previously diagnosed disabled. With the help of e-waste they are making a disabled person self-reliant.

In 2019, they organised the National Blind Cricket Championship with the association with Cricket Association for the Blind in India and Rajasthan Cricket Association of Blind. The NGO is working on World of Humanity Centre, where patients with different health issues can get free of cost benefits and become part of. It helps by providing free education, healthcare & skill training to make individuals a better place in mainstream society.

The hospital has 450 beds and providing free treatment. The project is also helping to provide vocational training for those who were blind, deaf, or mute. NGO is also providing residential facilities and intellectually disabled orphans, and poor children to make them self-dependent.

During the lockdown in 2020, the organisation was the distribution of helping aids viz. food, clothes, etc. to the needy people like auto rickshaw drivers, migrants, local residents, slum dwellers, and workers in the city. They were also distributing sanitiser, mask to protect from COVID-19 which were manufactured by disabled people and providing skill training.

In August 2020, NSS along with Zomato, an Indian multinational restaurant aggregator and food delivery company, to provide aid to 1000 families affected by the floods in Assam.

== Work ==
The NGO has also extended its support to the disabled children and adults whilst sharpening their skills, creating an opportunity for them to earn a livelihood. The NGO organized various skill development programs, like sewing training, mobile and computer hardware repairing, mehndi training, etc.; to support them in being self-dependent.

It also has Narayan Divyang Sports Academy to uplift the talent of the disabled community. They are proving training to para-athletes in 14 different sports including table tennis, wheelchair basketball, wheelchair rugby and wheelchair tennis, archery, football, goalball, judo, powerlifting, shooting, sitting volleyball, and respective championships and tournament.

The other part is Narayan Children Academy which is providing education to the poor and needy to improve the quality of education. The organisation is providing school training also from Georgia Southern University professors. NGO is training the teachers from Narayan Seva Sansthan, STEMCOE (STEM Center of Excellence) took to catering the needs of providing holistic education. They are also creating smart villages for disabled people with facilities like hospitals, schools, banks, post offices, and other amenities and facilities, within the campus.

== Rehabilitation ==
Before the onset of COVID-19 Pandemic, Narayan Seva Sansthan conducted about 420,250 corrective surgeries, 13,612 artificial limbs distribution camp along with the distribution of 269803 wheelchairs.

The NGO is involved in improving diviyang community economically also by manufacturing PPE Kit. The organisation is helping for social rehabilitation, it had organised a mass wedding event for disabled couples with polio. Held in the Ramlila Maidan, New Delhi, 92 couples were married, walking to the stage with their crutches visible.

Around 2051 disabled & Underprivileged Couples were married under the NGO scheme. Other Social activities where NGO seems to be involved are fashion & talent shows, De-Addiction Campaigns, Blood Donation Camps, Polio Pulse Campaigns, Mobile Medical Van, and Orphanage Home "Bhagwan Mahaveer Nirashrit Balgrah".

== Events ==
On 15 June 2014, it had organised a mass wedding event for disabled couples with polio. Held in the Ramlila Maidan, New Delhi, 92 couples were married, walking to the stage with their crutches visible. celebrated 25th Divyang Vivah in New Delhi by Narayan Seva Sansthan. The organisation has set up a similar facility in Uganda in East Africa with around 3000 beneficiaries and is looking to replicate the ideas in other places too.

Narayan Seva Sansthan also organised a campaign, 'Africa Seva Tour' with the joint association of Gayatri Parivar of Lenasia, Republic of South Africa. This campaign served towards catering the disabled children and adults' needs for artificial limbs and calipers distribution, dated on 25 February 2020. The 'Africa Seva Tour' worked in alliance with the Central Government's program 'India for Humanity', which was organized in Lenasia, Republic of South Africa.

In 2019, The NGO hosted a Divyang Talent and fashion Show at JVPD ground in Mumbai. Divya heroes exhibited their talent with wheelchairs, calipers, crutches, and artificial limbs at the event. The performers had medical conditions like autism, cerebral palsy, and polio.

In February 2021, NSS also donated 11 lakhs for the construction of the Ram Mandir temple in Ayodhya

== Awards ==
The NGO has received Padma Shree Award in 2008, 'Asia's Most Trusted Brand Award' in the year 2016, and the Quality Mark Award in the NGO segment.
