= World Vision India =

Indian non-profit organisation

- Founder: Robert Pierce
- Type: Non-governmental
- Purpose: Child and social welfare
- Headquarters: Chennai, Tamilnadu
- Chief Functionary: Madhav Durga Bellamkonda
- Website: www.worldvision.in

World Vision India, headquartered in Chennai, is a Christian charitable organisation, registered as a society under the Societies Registration Act of Tamil Nadu 1975. The organisation's primary stated goals are Child and Social Welfare.

== History ==
It all began in 1947, when Robert (Bob) Pierce began supporting White Jade, a little girl in an orphanage in China, who was abandoned by her parents. Bob gave the warden, Tena Hoelkedoer, his last five dollars and agreed to send the same amount each month to help care for the girl. In 1950, Bob Pierce started World Vision. The child sponsorship programme began in response to the needs of hundreds of thousands of orphans of the Korean War. In 1951, World Vision started operations in India and subsequently set up a single-room office in Kolkata in 1958.

In 1960, World Vision India started six childcare projects and worked with institutions for child well-being. A decade later, in 1970, World Vision India embraced a broader community development model and established an emergency relief division. The organisation also attempted to address the causes of poverty by focusing on community needs such as water, sanitation, education, health, leadership training and income generation. The World Vision of India Board was constituted in 1975 and the organisation was registered the following year under the Tamil Nadu Societies Registration Act. They also mounted one of their largest relief operations in response to the tidal wave disaster at Machilipatnam, Andhra Pradesh in 1977.

In 1990, World Vision India moved from the Community Development Projects to Area Development Programmes. From early 2000s, the grassroots organisation, began strengthening their advocacy efforts, particularly on issues related to child survival. They became more active in working with governments, businesses and other organisations in addressing issues such as child labour, children in armed conflict and the sexual exploitation of women and children.

World Vision India now works in 200 districts impacting around 26 lakh children and their families in over 6200 communities spread across 24 states and 1 union territory to address issues affecting children in partnership with governments, civil societies, donors and corporates.

== Financing ==
In India, sponsorships provide the majority of resources for programmes implemented by World Vision India. Donors and sponsors from 18 countries including over 10,000 Indians sponsor close to 200,000 children in 107 programmes around India. World Vision India programmes also access resources from the Government of India as well as other countries such as U.S., Canada, UK, Japan, Finland and Ireland to mention a few.

== Child sponsorships ==
World Vision India's child sponsorship programmes help children in need get access to clean drinking water, sanitation, education, skills for future livelihood, nutrition, health care and participate in an age-appropriate in development processes. The sponsorship amount per month is Rs. 800 (in India). It is different from a donation and anybody interested to be part of this sponsorship process can be involved.

== Area Development Programs ==
Area Development Programmes (ADPs) are integrated development programme that help communities by assisting the children, families and the community block as a whole achieve the basic standards of the four 'well-beings': physical, intellectual, socio-economic and moral well-being. Each World Vision India ADP touches the lives of 20,000 to 1,00,000 people. There are 162 ADPs spread over 25 states around the country, working in over 5000 communities.

World Vision India has various programmes such as Positive Parenting, Children's Groups, Child Parliament, Men Care Groups, Youth Groups, Self-Help Groups and so much to create a holistic development for the most vulnerable children

== Initiatives ==
=== Disaster relief ===
World Vision has been involved in every major disaster in India since storm surge from the 1977 Andhra Pradesh cyclone affected Machilipatnam. The Bhopal Gas Tragedy (1984), the Orissa Super Cyclone (1999) and the Gujarat Earthquake (2001) were among its major relief interventions. Tsunami (2004) spread out the World Vision's India Tsunami Relief Team all over the coastal regions of the peninsula and the J&K Earthquake (2005) drew a team to the Himalayas. World Vision India brings life-saving support in times of disaster. The organisation is committed to long-term rehabilitation, helping communities affected by natural disasters or conflicts get back on their feet. They also work to make vulnerable communities more resilient.

=== Child education ===
Child education is one of the main initiatives of World Vision. World Vision's child sponsorship programmes aim to help families meet the education needs of their children through sponsorship. World Vision's Child Education projects ensure that every child is given the right to education, especially between the age group of 6 to 14 years. During the 2011 Union Budget the organisation campaigned to help ensure that there was an increase in the current budget allocation of 4% for children education and development in the country.

=== Children's health ===
Children's health is one of the main issues that World Vision helps tackle in the country. It works to address the causes of malnutrition with special focus on children below 5 years, pregnant women and mothers through counseling, emergency feeding programmes, nutrition gardens, health worker training and infrastructure development at the Anganwadis (child care centres)

=== Gender and development ===
World Vision India works with families and communities to eliminate negative cultural attitudes and strengthen their roles in improving the status of the girl child. Girl child education is encouraged through tuition centres, girl power groups, provision of bicycles to go to school, construction of toilets in schools, creating awareness on education for parents and more.

=== Water, sanitation and hygiene ===
World Vision India's work on WASH (Water, Sanitation & Hygiene) focuses on providing children and families with access to clean drinking water and promoting good hygiene and sanitation practices through construction of toilets in schools, homes and communities. The non-profit organisation works to promote open-defecation-free communities, change behaviours and create healthy environments.

=== Livelihood ===
World Vision India's livelihood interventions enable families to enhance income and provide better for their children. World Vision India provides economic assistance for better agriculture, livestock and small businesses. They also enhance market access for farmers and entrepreneurs and equip youths with employable skills.
