= Shoshit Seva Sangh =

- Founded: 16 July 2004
- Type: Not for Profit - Registered Trust
- Purpose: Musahar community of Bihar
- Location: Patna, Bihar, India
- Method: Education
- Key people: J. K. Sinha
- Website: https://www.sssfoundation.org/

The Shoshit Seva Sangh (SSS Foundation) is a not-for-profit non-governmental organization based in Patna created to fund charitable projects which deal with:

- relief from poverty and distress;
- education;
- medical relief; and
- the advancement of any other object of general public utility in the interest of social welfare and for the benefit of the public in general.

Its charter states that the Shoshit Seva Sangh aims to assist the underprivileged irrespective of their religion, race, caste, creed or gender, and seeks to establish, support and maintain institutions towards this end.

== History ==
The Shoshit Seva Sangh was founded by J. K. Sinha, a retired Indian Police Service officer and chartered on 16 July 2004 as a not-for-profit organization created to fund the economic, educational, social and cultural uplift of underprivileged sections of society, is based out of Patna, the capital of the state of Bihar. Bihar itself is one of the poorest and most backward states of India, where an estimated 50% of the population lives below the poverty line (as against the national Indian average of 20% to 25%).

== Focus on the Musahar community ==
Among the vast poverty-ridden population of Bihar, one of the most exploited and deprived sections is the Musahar community. The Musahar are landless laborers, living in grinding poverty and sub-human condition for centuries in ghettoes called 'Musaharis' or 'Musahar Tolis' which are found on the outskirts of villages in Bihar.

Culturally, the population features large extended families requiring greater financial resources to sustain themselves. The unemployment rate is overwhelming, and much of this can be traced to the lack of employable skills or a mismatch between the skills of the residents and those required by regional industries. Government initiatives in relation to poverty alleviation programs, housing, nutrition, education, and skill development are mostly on paper and there is little or no positive impact of state intervention on the Musahar. Deprived of both capital and skill, Musahar have remained trapped in a cycle of poverty for centuries. Since the Musahar are one of the most underprivileged sections of Indian society, the Shoshit Seva Sangh's efforts are targeted at this community.

SSS Foundation runs a CBSE affiliated school for the children of the Musahar community, and provides quality education until class 12 as well as board and lodging, uniforms, toiletries, books and access to computers absolutely free of charge.
