= Chavara Cultural Centre =

- Founder: Fr. Albert Nambiar Parambil
- Headquarters: Kochi
- Location: Kochi, India
- Coordinates: 9.9718625°N 76.2855897°E
- Origins: 1971
- Key people: Fr. Anil Philip
- Publication: Moolyasruthi
- Website: www.chavaraculturalcentre.com

Chavara Cultural Centre, set up in memory of the Catholic saint and social reformer, Kuriakose Elias Chavara, is a non-sectarian cultural centre located at Kochi, in the south Indian state of Kerala. It was established by the Carmelites of Mary Immaculate congregation in the year 1971. The centre is recognised by the United Nations as a national non-governmental organization.

== Overview ==
Chavara Cultural Centre, founded by Fr. Albert Nambiar Parambil, was established with the mission to uphold inter-religious harmony and brotherhood, and for the development of art, culture and education. The organization hosts an auditorium for public events, a Public Library, an institute of Aviation and Hotel Management, a Film School, a matrimony center, a waste management centre, a school offering coaching in languages, music, dance, yoga and martial arts and organizes cultural programs regularly. The Centre was recognized by United Nations Department of Economic and Social Affairs as a non-sectarian, non-political voluntary organization in 1980. The Centre is also affiliated to a number of international organizations which include Alliance française, International Interfaith Organizations Network (IION), International Association for Religious Freedom (IARF), Doha International Center for Interfaith Dialogue (DICID), Doha World Fellowship for Inter-Religious Councils, Pastoral Orientation Centre, Kochi and Kerala Anti-Curruption People's Movement. Moolyasruthi, a monthly mamgazine covering socio-cultural and literary themes, is published by the Centre.

== See also ==
- Vallathol Museum
