= Foreign Contribution (Regulation) legislation in India =

Act of the Parliament of India

Parliament of India
- Long title: An Act to consolidate the law to regulate foreign contributions and foreign hospitality by certain individuals or associations or companies and to prohibit acceptance and utilisation of foreign contribution or foreign hospitality for any activities detrimental to the national interest and for matters connected therewith or incidental thereto.
- Passed by: Rajya Sabha
- Passed: 19 August 2010
- Passed by: Lok Sabha
- Passed: 27 August 2010
- Assented to: 26 September 2010
- Commenced: 1 May 2011

Legislative history

Initiating chamber: Rajya Sabha
- Introduced: 18 December 2006
- Committee report: Department-related Parliamentary Standing Committee on Home Affairs One hundred and thirty fourth report on The Foreign Contribution (Regulation) Bill, 2006

Amended by
- The Foreign Contribution (Regulation) Amendment Act, 2022
- Status: In force (amended)

The Foreign Contribution (Regulation) Act (FCRA) is Indian legislation. Its legislative history dates to the Foreign Contribution (Regulation) Act, 1976 enacted to regulate foreign contributions and foreign hospitality by certain individuals or associations or companies and to prohibit acceptance and utilisation of foreign contribution or foreign hospitality for any activities detrimental to the national interest. which consolidated and amended the law governing foreign contributions and foreign hospitality. The bill received presidential assent on 26 September 2010 and came into force on 1 May 2011.

== Amendments ==
=== Foreign Contribution (Regulation) Act, 1976 ===
The Foreign Contribution (Regulation) Act, 1976 was an Act of Parliament enacted during the Indira Gandhi government of the Indian National Congress on 31 March 1976. It was introduced to regulate the acceptance and utilisation of foreign contributions and foreign hospitality by certain individuals and associations. The Act came into force on 5 August 1976. It remained the principal legislation governing foreign contributions until it was repealed and replaced by the Foreign Contribution (Regulation) Act, 2010.

=== Foreign Contribution (Regulation) Amendment Act, 2020 ===
The Minister of Home Affairs, Amit Shah introduced the Foreign Contribution (Regulation) Amendment Bill, 2020, which made several changes to the existing Act, including making it mandatory for office bearers of any non-governmental organisation (NGO) to provide their Aadhaar numbers. It also gives the government the power to hold a "summary enquiry" to prevent an organization from using foreign funds. These changes were intended to increase transparency regarding the use of foreign money for NGOs.

The Bill was unanimously passed by the Lok Sabha on 21 September 2020. The Rajya Sabha also passed the bill unanimously, on 23 September 2020.

The Centre has also omitted provision ‘b’ in rule 13, which dealt with declaring foreign funds including details of donors, amount received, and date of receipt every quarter on its website. Now only once a year the organizations in FCRA can file the audited balance sheet in the website of the Ministry or also on their own website.

=== Foreign Contribution (Regulation) Amendment Bill, 2026 ===
- Aadhaar has been made mandatory for key office-bearers, directors, and functionaries of organisations registered under the FCRA to strengthen identity verification and compliance.
- The Bill applies to NGOs, trusts, societies, and associations that receive foreign contributions under the Foreign Contribution (Regulation) Act, 2010.
- The Bill requires that foreign contributions must be used only for the purpose for which they were received, ensuring greater accountability in the utilisation of foreign funds.
- If an organisation's FCRA registration is cancelled, suspended, or expires, its foreign-funded assets will be managed by a Designated Authority appointed by the Central Government until they are disposed of according to law.
- The Bill seeks to prevent the diversion or misuse of foreign contributions by strengthening government oversight over the receipt, utilisation, and disposal of foreign-funded assets.
- The Amendment aims to improve transparency, accountability, and regulatory oversight in the management of foreign contributions received by organisations in India.
- During the period when an organisation's FCRA registration is suspended, it cannot freely use, transfer, or dispose of assets created from foreign contributions except in accordance with the provisions of the Act.

== Implementation ==
On 30 June 2026, the Ministry of Home Affairs launched the FCRA 2.0 Portal, a redesigned digital portal for administration of the Act. According to the Ministry, the portal digitises processes relating to registration, renewal, annual returns and other services, and incorporates features such as Aadhaar-based authentication, e-Sign, OCR-based document processing and integration with government databases including PAN, Aadhaar, NGO Darpan and the ICAI UDIN system. The ministry stated that the portal was intended to simplify compliance, reduce paperwork and strengthen monitoring of foreign contributions.

== Criticisms ==
A number of NGOs receiving foreign funding are seen by the India's central government as involved in anti-development activism and hence posing a negative impact on the economic growth by two to three per cent. An Intelligence Bureau report titled 'Impact of NGOs on Development,’ claims the NGOs and their international donors are also planning to target many fresh economic development projects.

Home ministry has cancelled some more registrations including top 8 national educational institutions such as –Jawaharlal Nehru University, IIT-Kanpur and Jamia Milia Islamia saying that these institutes are not maintaining proper FCRA account. So, unless their registrations are restored, these institutions cannot receive contributions from abroad. Later the FCRA status of Jamia Milia Islamia was restored in September 2012 following the submission of its report to the government. The Ministry of Home Affairs has since clarified that Jamia is exempt from all provisions of the FCRA and therefore there is no bar on Jamia to receive/spend foreign contributions.

The Central Home Ministry has cancelled renewal of Foreign Contribution Regulation Act (FCRA) licences of Greenpeace India and two NGOs run by activist Teesta Setalvad who is an Indian civil rights activist and journalist. Greenpeace has been charged with obstructing development activities in India by the Government of India in 2013 (Under congress led UPA government) after intelligence Bureau inputs. Greenpeace India is charged with undertaking protests against thermal power, nuclear power, coal and aluminium mining across the India. GreenPeace has also been charged with promoting Solar energy equipment of US based Zemlin Surface Optical Corporation especially in Bihar. Greenpeace India admitted to anchoring local protests against coal mines and participating in seminars where foreign funding is sought for protests but clarified that the source of funding does not lessen the seriousness of harm to the environment. According to IB (Intelligence Bureau) report, Greenpeace poses threat to national economic security, growing exponentially in reach, impact, volunteers and media influence.

Teesta Setalvad is the secretary of Citizens for Justice and Peace (CJP), an organisation which lays its agenda as fighting for justice for the victims of communal violence in the state of Gujarat in 2002. CJP is a co-petitioner seeking a criminal trial of Narendra Modi, the then Chief Minister of Gujarat and the current Prime minister of India, and sixty-two other politicians and government officials for complicity in the Gujarat violence of 2002 and whose names did not figure in any of the FIRs /charge sheets that formed the subject matter of the various Session Trials regarding the riots at that point of time. However, the actions against Greenpeace were initiated in 2013 based on a report issued by IB during UPA rule led by Congress party which is an arch political rival of Narendra Modi.

In September 2015, Ministry of Home Affairs (MHA) cancelled the FCRA registration of Greenpeace India, making impossible any foreign donation to Greenpeace India. The measure was said to have been executed on the grounds of "prejudicially affecting the public interest and economic interest of the state".

Recently, another NGO Compassion International had to shut down India operations after the government refused permission to accept foreign funding. Earlier, Compassion International was put on the "watch list" by the Home Ministry amid reports by security agencies that it was funding unregistered Indian NGOs which were accused of encouraging religious conversions. The Obama administration as well as the Trump administration pursued the case in the highest level amid the risk of a diplomatic tussle.

At the 2017 "peer review" by the UN Human Rights Council held at Geneva, Indian government faced tough questioning by fellow nations. The attack on the FCRA act came from nearly a dozen countries, mostly from Europe. The charge was led by the U.S. and Germany, who called the Act and the government's actions "arbitrary".

On 29 September 2020, human rights watchdog Amnesty International declared that it was wrapping up its Indian operations and shutting offices due to a 'complete freeze' on its finances by the Narendra Modi-led National Democratic Alliance government after the FCRA was amended earlier that month.

In 2026 the Catholic Church in India called for a day of prayer over concerns that changes to the FCRA could negatively impact its work in the fields of education and poverty relief.

== FCRA Bribery Scams ==
In May 2022, the Central Bureau of Investigation (CBI) initiated raids against FCRA officials and NGOs involved in a series of scams to facilitate clearances of files and also those who demand money upon receiving foreign funds. While the Home Ministry plans to overhaul the entire FCRA division, CBI questioned multiple officers with suspicion that there could be many within the Home Ministry involved in these scams carried out by the Ministry of Home Affairs, Government of India.

== See also ==
- Foreign Contribution (Regulation) Act, 2020
- List of non-governmental organisations in India
- List of acts of the Parliament of India
- Lawmaking procedure in India
