= Gurshaahi =

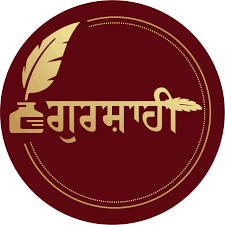
Gurshaahi Logo

Gurshaahi is a Punjabi web portal owned by the Gurshaahi Foundation, a nonprofit and non-governmental organization dedicated to the promotion of the Punjabi literature across the world. It has digitalized about 1500 punjabi poetry excerpts of prominent writers from Indian Punjab and Pakistani Punjab. It serves content in multiple scripts such as Gurmukhi, Shahmukhi and Roman. It also includes forgotten poetries from poets, including Baba Farid, Bulle Shah, Shah Hussain, Waris Shah, Shiv Kumar Batalvi and many others. Furthermore, it hosts shayari from centuries earlier and is taking a great step forward for the preservation of Punjabi literature. The Instagram portal has digitalized more than 1500 verses which are categorically classified into different sections such as Char'da Punjab, Lahnda Punjab, Interviews, Quiz and translated work. It is also credited for preserving ghazals, couplets, nazms and 100+ literary videos. Gurshaahi also started its podcasts on Apple Podcast and Spotify.

== Background ==
Gurshaahi came into existence on 25 February 2019 in Patiala, India. The Instagram portal came into existence after the idea of "Archive of Punjabi Literature" was introduced by some literature enthusiasts. The literary works, including Punjabi poetry were collected from different private and public libraries across major cities of Punjab such as Patiala, Bathinda, Ludhiana, including Punjab's capital Chandigarh. Its name was created by combining Gurmukhi (Punjabi script of Indian Punjab) and Shahmukhi (Punjabi script of Pakistani Punjab). On 29 September 2021, this organization was given the status of a foundation by The Government of India under Companies Act 2013.

== Punjabi Literature Promotion ==
Gurshaahi organizes live interviews for literature lovers on regular basis. Among which the following are prominent

=== Gallbaat ===
Gurshaahi launched a live season named "gallbaat" to mark the birth and death anniversaries of prominent people of various fields such as literature, music and poetry across its social channels. It is continuously attended by the people across the various countries, leading the Instagram portal to receive over one million views and over 23000 subscribers.

=== Pungarde Beej ===
It is generally attended by young poets who are taking the first step in their literary careers. It was primarily adopted to promote Punjabi literature where ghazals and nazms are recited by the budding writers, giving them first-hand experience to get in touch with the audience.

=== Shabad Saanjh ===
Under the interview series Shabad Saanjh people from literary field are invited to participate and interact. It also engages the literary figures in direct conversations to grassroot level audience, promoting Punjabi in the process.

=== Parwaaz ===
Under Parvaaz series, Gurshaahi brings personalities from different fields to the audience who are taking a great step in promoting the culture of Punjab.

=== Other Initiatives ===
Gurshaahi Foundation also started an e-learning initiative that seeks to promote the Gurmukhi script, which includes free Punjabi Learning courses for those who want to learn Punjabi. On the occasion of New Year, Gurshaahi took a new initiative to print literary calendars. Gurshaahi is also planning on opening rural libraries across Punjab.
