= Shaheed Bhagat Singh Seva Dal =

Organization providing Emergency services

Shaheed Bhagat Singh Seva Dal is a non-governmental organisation based in Delhi, India. The organisation, named after Indian freedom fighter martyr Bhagat Singh works towards access and availability of emergency services. It is led by former MLA Jitender Singh Shunty. The organisation used to help with cremation of unclaimed bodies before COVID-19; however, after the start of the pandemic, it recorded a great increase in number of calls. The organisation started mobile fronts to keep bodies safe overnight by storing them in refrigerators in ambulances so that the bodies could be cremated next day.

The organisation also arranged langar for workers of quarantine facilities, and for blood donation camps and free blood to those who needed it. As of May 2021, it had 8 drivers and 18 vehicles that included carriages and ambulances operated with the help of a team consisting of 22 people.

In the past, the organisation has been involved in several other activities. It had filed an FIR against Nasiruddin Shah for alleged anti-national remarks. The members of the organisation also protested in front of Pakistan High Commission, appealing to the Pakistan Government to put a stop to atrocities on Sikhs and other minorities in Pakistan. and did a lecture on the ideology of Bhagat Singh on the 108th anniversary of his birth in 2015.
