= Child In Need Institute =

Indian non-governmental organization

Child in Need India Child in Need Institute
- Abbreviation: CINI
- Formation: 1974; 52 years ago
- Type: NGO
- Purpose: Promote sustainable development in health, nutrition, education and protection of child, adolescent and woman in need
- Headquarters: Kolkata, India
- Coordinates: 22°26′02″N 88°17′44″E
- Secretary & Founder Director: Samir Chaudhuri
- Chairman of the Governing Body: Kalyan Mandal
- Staff: 1291
- Website: www.cini-india.org

Child in Need Institute (CINI; also Child in Need India) is a humanitarian organisation promoting "Sustainable development in health, nutrition and education of children, adolescents and women in need" in India. With its headquarters based in Kolkata (the then Calcutta), the CINI operates in some of the most poverty stricken areas in India. Its international arm, Fondazione CINI International, is based in Verona, Italy.

The CINI was founded by a Pediatrician, Samir Chaudhuri in 1974 and is involved in many community development-focused projects in India, addressing the underlying social causes of poverty, and collaborates with the Indian government and other local and international NGOs. CINI focuses primarily on health, nutrition, education of children and mothers. To date, its activities have reached around five million people, living in the states of West Bengal and Jharkhand.

The organisation is actively involved in projects in other countries within the continents of Asia and Africa, in cooperation with both aid organisations and UN agencies.

CINI shares its approaches with other organisations working in related fields, especially smaller, locally based, community NGOs. CINI has twice been awarded the Indian Government's National Award for Child Welfare.

CINI has around 1300 employees. Its activities are supported by independent national associations in a number of countries, and by Fondazione CINI International in Italy. CINI cooperates with Save the Children, UNICEF, CARE, the UK Department for International Development, the World Bank, the Indian government, and private corporations such as KPMG.

== History ==
CINI emerged in part from the work of its founder, Samir Chaudhuri, who began his medical career working in the villages and slums of West Bengal in the 1970s. His professional collaboration with Sister Pauline Prince, an Australian Loreto nun and nutritionist, and Rev Fr John Henrichs, Belgian Jesuit, led to the Child In Need Institute's foundation in 1974. CINI has gone on to become one of the leading humanitarian NGOs in India.

In 1998 CINI was recognised as a National Mother NGO, under the Reproductive and Child Health (RCH) program by the Ministry of Health and Family Welfare, Government of India. That same year it was also recognized as a collaborative training institute by the National Institute of Health and Family Welfare (NIHFW), New Delhi, and now constitutes the largest training facility in West Bengal for training health workers in nutrition, safe motherhood, and HIV awareness. This training facility was extended from CINI's own staff training centre to teach workers from other NGOs and the government.

The organisation has twice been awarded the National Award of Child Welfare by the Government of India. In 2007, Chaudhuri received the World of Children Health Award for making "a significant lifetime contribution to children in the fields of health, medicine or the sciences."

== Funding ==
CINI's projects are funded by grants from other aid organisations, international organisations and governments. CINI additionally receives funding from private corporations and individual donors in India and abroad. Its cooperation partners include corporations such as KPMG.

== Partnership ==
CINI recently formed a partnership with Resource Group For Education And Advocacy For Community Health, a non-profit organisation founded in 1999, to eliminate tuberculosis and make Odisha and Jharkhand TB-free by 2025 under National Strategic Plan (NSP).

== Awards ==
CINI or its founder and director Samir Chaudhuri have received many awards over the years, including

- 2012 BBC Radio 4 Appeal by Sir Mark Tully
- 2011 The WHO Award for Excellence in Primary Health Care, presented to CINI director Samir Chaudhuri by Indian health and family welfare minister Sudip Bandhopadhya at the Taj Palace in New Delhi on 22 December 2011.
- 2008 Ellis Island Medal of Honor Global Humanitarian Award awarded to Samir Chaudhuri
