= Geeta Dharmarajan =

Indian writer, teacher, and editor

- Born: Geeta Krishnaswamy; 19 September 1948 (age 78); Chennai, Tamil Nadu, India
- Other name: K. Geeta
- Awards: Padma Shri: 2012 Millinnium Alliance Innovator. Instituted by USAID, Government of India and FICCI, 2013 Stockholm Challenge: 2001
- Website: www.katha.org

Geeta Dharmarajan (born 19 September 1948) is a writer, editor, educator and the executive director of Katha, a nonprofit organisation that she founded in 1988. Her work focuses on education, especially of children from poor families.

Katha is a registered non-profit and non-governmental organisation based in Delhi in 1989. Katha works in teacher training, children's education and literature. Katha works in underprivileged areas across India. A teaching/learning tool that she devised, "story pedagogy", has been in use in Katha's learning centres since 2001.

Dharmarajan's professional editorial experience that began with Target, a children's magazine, and continued with The Pennsylvania Gazette, the award-winning alumni magazine of the University of Pennsylvania. Geeta's published works include more than 30 children's books and over 450 individual pieces in magazines and newspapers in India and abroad. The Government of India awarded her the civilian honour of Padma Shri in 2012.

== Personal life ==
Geeta Dharmarajan was born in Chennai in the Indian state of Tamil Nadu in 1948. She was introduced early to the diversity of India through the work of her father, N. Krishnaswamy a doctor and allergist. Her mother was Kalyani Krishnaswamy, a poet and composer of classical Carnatic padams. She started learning classical Bharatanatyam and Carnatic music when she was seven years old. She was educated in Holy Angels' High School where she represented the school in dance and netball. She was elected Head Girl of the school and led the south Indian contingent to the Bharat Girl Guides Jamboree in her final year. She graduated from Stella Maris College in English Literature, standing fourth.

== Katha Books ==
Geeta is the editor in chief of Katha's list which includes the Katha Prize Stories. She has edited stories from more than 300 of India's best literary talents, writing in 21 Indian languages. Katha Books are a showcase of contemporary Indian fiction for adults and children. Katha introduced an array of writings from India's many oral and written traditions to children, ages 0 – 17. Classy productions, child friendly layouts and illustrations go in tandem with excellent writing. Her major activities include the institution of the Katha Awards for Literary Excellence, and curating the Katha Festivals and utsavs that bring literature to the public. These create meeting places for writers, translators, scholars, critics, storytellers and contemporary artists and community activists. Geeta led the writers workshop initiative for the central Board of Secondary Education, with partnerships established in 500 schools in India

== Katha Schools ==
The Katha Lab School started in 1990 with five children. Today it is a centre of creativity for the slum cluster it is situated in, producing professionals every year who become entrepreneurs who support their families, or go on to higher studies. More than 80% of Katha's children go to college. It was recently visited by The Prince of Wales.
