= Shakti Shalini (NGO) =

Delhi-based NGO for survivors of violence

- Formation: August 31, 1987; 39 years ago
- Founder: Shahjehan Aapa; Satya Rani Chadha
- Type: NGO
- Purpose: To combat sexual and gender-based violence (SGBV); To promote gender equality, individual choice and dignity
- Headquarters: New Delhi, India
- Region served: Delhi (New Delhi and Jangpura)
- Chairperson: Sudha Tiwari
- Honorary Secretary: Bharti Sharma
- Website: https://shaktishalini.org/

Shakti Shalini is a women-led non-governmental organisation (NGO) based in New Delhi, India that supports the survivors of domestic violence, gender-based violence and sexual violence. It was founded by Shahjehan Aapa and Satya Rani Chadha in 1987. They both lost their daughters to bride burning, a form of dowry death. The NGO also supports survivors of marital rape, still not criminalised in India.

According to their official website, Shakti Shalini has supported over 15,000 women, worked with five marginalised communities, engaged over 2000 residents within marginalised communities into grassroots feminist mobilisation and engaged over 500 individuals into skills training and workshops regarding 'art for activism.'

== Background ==
=== Dowry deaths and bride burnings ===
Dowry death is defined by Feminism & Psychology journal as, "[...] a common form of femicide in South Asian societies that results from the husband and his family continually attempting to extract more dowry from the bride's family."

In case of a bride burning, which in turn is a form of dowry death, typically a married woman is doused in kerosene (a fuel that used to be prevalent for cooking among Indian households) or any other flammable liquid and is then set on fire and the same is tried to be passed off as a "kitchen accident" by the husband and the in-laws, leading to under-counting of dowry deaths.

=== Shahjehan Aapa ===
Shahjehan Begum, called as Aapa (meaning 'elder sister' in Urdu) by people around her, was born in Mathura, Uttar Pradesh in 1936. She and her sister lost their parents to the Partition. As an orphan, being a "burden" on her foster parents, she couldn't get access to quality education, unlike the children of her foster parents. She got some education from the Madrasa. There, she got interested in reading and understanding the Qur'an in depth, for which she enrolled herself into an Urdu-medium school. Despite getting emotionally blackmailed by her foster father to not join the school, she persisted. Soon she was married off by her foster parents to the son of her foster father's first wife, in 1950. She was a fourteen-year-old child at that time. She refused but he again emotionally blackmailed, putting his cap on her feet and saying, "My honour is in your hands." She swallowed her feelings, kept quiet and married. He would abuse her and beat her. Later on, he would also taunt her for stepping outside the house and going to the police stations to help the survivors or families of the victims of the dowry deaths to get their FIRs registered. She gave birth to 7 sons and 2 daughters. At a village, she was made overburdened with all domestic duties by her in-laws, including the cattle work for 14–15 buffaloes and 3–4 cows. She was forced to pick cow dung and smear it onto the floors, a chore that nauseated her.

==== Demise of Nur Jahan ====
Aapa's daughter, Nur Jahan, died in 1978 from dowry death. Not getting any cooperation from the police due to the alleged bribery, Aapa and several other women in the neighborhood, gheraoed the Nangloi police station.

Activist and practising lawyer, Nandita Haksar helped Aapa in seeking justice, including fighting the case of Nur Jahan.

Initially, Aapa formed a Dahej Virodhi Mahila Samiti (transl. Women's Committee Against Dowry) along with 25 women from her locality.

=== Satya Rani Chadha and the demise of her daughter, Shashi Bala ===
Satya Rani Chadha was a widow with five children and modest means to bring them up.

In May 1978, Chadha's daughter, Shashi Bala graduated from Lakshmibai College of Delhi University, becoming the first woman to graduate from her family.

After completing her bachelor's degree, Shashi Bala wanted to study law. Chadha persuaded her to meet the prospective groom for arranged marriage she had chosen for her, a heavy regret that Chadha will suffer from the rest of her life.

Before the wedding Shashi Bala's to-be mother-in-law demanded a scooter, a refrigerator and a television set as part of the dowry. Chadha, despite not being able to afford, agreed to give a refrigerator. The demands persisted even after the marriage. Initially she gave ₹1000 to Shashi Bala's husband. Later, she was asked for scooter as dowry again.

Two days later, on 17 March 1979, Shashi Bala was burned alive by her in-laws and died from the 100% burns. She was six months pregnant and 24 years old.

Her neighbour, Chandrakanta Kapoor, lost her daughter, Kanchan Mala, also, two weeks later to dowry death.

=== Anti-dowry movement ===
Although women's groups and social reformers like Mamasaheb Kulkarni were protesting against dowry in the 1970's, (Note: Quoting, The History of Doing by Radha Kumar, "The first protests against dowry in the contemporary feminist movement were made by the Progressive Organization of Women in Hyderabad in 1975. Though some of their demonstrations numbered as many as 2000 people, the protests did not grow into a full fledged campaign."; In 1973, Damodar Balwant Kulkarni (alias Mamasaheb Kulkarni; D. B. Kulkarni) launched Hunda Virodhi Chalval (transl. Movement Against Dowry) in Mumbai, then Bombay, and up to some extent in the other parts of Maharashtra.; Quoting Patel, Vibhuti (1985), Women's Struggles and Women's Movement in India, "Between 1977 and 1979 new women’s groups emerged in the cities like Delhi, Banglore, Hyderabad, Bombay, Ahmedabad, Patna, and Madras. They organised protest actions against dowry murders, beauty contests, sexist portrayal of women in media, pornographic films and literature imported from abroad, introduction of virginity tests by the U.K. immigration authorities, custodial rape and pitiable condition of women in prison."; Demonstration by Stree Sangharsh on 1 June 1979, and creation of landmark feminist street play, Om Swaha (1979) by Street Sangharsh and Theatre Union after the dowry deaths of Tarvinder Kaur and Hardeep Kaur (both of them happened to be childhood friends), on 2 November 1978 and 17 May 1979 respectively, are considered as importance milestones towards the anti-dowry movement.) it was the decade of 1980's when the anti-dowry protests gained momentum and went on to culminate into a full-fledged movement. Chadha participated in many anti-dowry demonstrations, one such being in 1980, where she got photographed by Sheba Chhachhi. Chadha went on to become the face of the anti-dowry movement.

== History ==
Grief from loss of their daughters became a catalyst for both Aapa and Chadha in doing something for the survivors.

In 1986, realising there is a need for having a safe space for the survivors of violence and upon the suggestion of Viji Srinivasan—the program director at New Delhi office of Ford Foundation—Chadha and Aapa rented a house in the Pamposh Enclave and named it 'Shakti Shalini.' The Embassy of Norway in India gifted them a jeep for the field work.

Very quickly the home was packed and stayed that way. Despite a capacity for ten women, the home at one time had 45 residents in age from 18 to 60, including those with children. They spoke different languages and had their own food preferences. There were working and upper-class women, too. By the 1990s, many teenage girls were reportedly running away from their family, mostly to avoid a forced marriage, and coming to the shelter.

Starting out as an informal women's group and with the help of Srinivasan procuring funds and securing an accommodation for the shelter, Shakti Shalini got formally registered on 31 August 1987.

The NGO, was called as 'Shaktishalini' (no gaps in the title) until the end of the 20th century. It was renamed to 'Shakti Shalini' (a gap in the title between 'Shakti' and 'Shalini') later on.

Shakti (transl. power) Shalini (transl. a woman of dignity) was named in the memory of Shanti, a survivor from Jaipur, Rajasthan, thrown off from the third floor of a building (terrace) by her partner. Aapa got so immersed in her case that she couldn't make it to the court dates of Nur Jahan's case.

In the last seven years, Shakti Shalini has handled over 1,100 cases, 60 per cent of them pertaining to violence. The remainder include cases of rape, bride-burning and women chucked on to the streets after the father has claimed the children.

— Streevani, 1996, Documentation on Women & Violence, Volume 2.

Shakti Shalini's strong stance against dowry-related violence in its early days, was met with resistance by older women, who were in the favour of patriarchal bargain, worrying that the NGO seeking justice for the survivors would affect the izzat of the families of the survivors.

The notion of the patriarchal bargain also helps to explain why struggles to end violence sometimes meet resistance from women, as well as men. The type of bargain a woman makes with patriarchy varies according to the institution to which she is loyal. If a woman sees her best interests being served by upholding the status of the family, she will protect that status even if doing so perpetuates violence against other women. Shakti Shalini, a grassroots NGO in Delhi, India, opposes dowry-related violence. In the late 1980s, NGO workers told a member of Oxfam staff that older women dislike the organisation's approach to dowry because they fear that women who are in contact with the organisation will start speaking for themselves, become activists, and even leave their households. In particular, the older women criticised Shakti Shalini for taking extreme cases of violence to court, because in a court case the honour of the family is questioned, and its reputation jeopardised (Piza-Lopez, no date given, Oxfam internal document).

Shakti Shalini, also, in its initial days, would not get cooperation from the police, with the founders being labelled 'homewreckers' for seeking justice.

In 1990, Shakti Shalini and the fellow NGOs, Action India and Ankur, set up a joint study circle called as 'Women and Religion Group.' The joint study circle held a session at a regional meeting in Kanpur in 1992 at the National Women's Conference called as 'Reinterpretation of Religious Texts' exploring the feminist perspectives on Sita, Kaushalya, Kaikeyi and Surpanakha in the Ramayana. The joint study circle was active until 1993.

Shakti Shalini and fellow secular-minded grassroots NGOs, Action India, Sabla Sangh, Alarippu and Ankur also collaborated with the progressive activist groups like Sampradayika Virodh Andalon (transl. Movement Against Communalism; SVA) in the 1990's. SVA was formed after the 1984 anti-Sikh riots as a counter-force against communalism and to mobilise public opinion in Delhi and cities like Kanpur, particularly in the universities.

At the peak of the feminist street theatre in India, which is said to be somewhere between the period after the Emergency and before 1990's liberalisation of the economy, Shakti Shalini volunteers would partake in acting in and contributing to the street plays.

In April 1992, in light of a landmark judgement by the High Court of Jaipur, that dismissed the termination order by Government of Rajasthan of the sathins (a word for the grassroots-level frontline workers in India) and upholding of the rights of sathins, Shakti Shalini, along with the fellow Delhi-based NGOs, Saheli, Joint Women’s Programme, Action India, Nirman Mazdoor Panchayat Sangam and Sabla Sangh, formed a team and gave a closer scrutiny to the Rajasthan Women’s Programme that was set up in 1984 with a 30-page report after dispatching the team to Jaipur and Ajmer for The report criticised the forced sterilisation (recognised as a human rights violation by multiple UN agencies), being carried out under the Programme.

Nevertheless, workers are manipulated by authorities to achieve family planning targets. The report said people were forcibly sterilized for the second if not third time; loans to dig wells, build houses, buy cattle were given only to those who had been sterilized; women were publicly humiliated by being asked to show the scars of their operation. Done in unsafe conditions, operations have led to complications and even death.

In March 1991, the sathins in Ajmer district had to take an oath before the district collector that they would meet their assigned family planning targets. Their salary was stopped for two months because they failed to do so.

Since 1993, Shakti Shalini has made collaborative efforts with the Crime Against Women Cell of Delhi Police along side fellow NGOs like Saheli and Mahila Jagriti Samiti, helping the Cell with the counselling of survivors and follow-up of out of court settlement cases.

Since 1995–96, Shakti Shalini has collaborated with the socially responsible theatre group, Pandies’ Theatre, founded by Sanjay Kumar in 1987 and registered in 1993.

In 2000, there was a procedural lapse of the Juvenile Justice Act, 1986, by Shakti Shalini in regards to securing the custody of a destitute minor without getting prior permission from competent authority. After the same was brought to attention by the Juvenile Welfare Board, the NGO had promptly complied.

On 21 April 2019, Shakti Shalini hosted the Greek play, Medea in collaboration with Pandies' Theatre. It was directed, adapted and translated in Hindustani by Anuradha Marwah. Audience were women and children from Shakti Shalini and Nehru Nagar basti (working-class settlement) with some activists and academics.

In May–June 2019, Shakti Shalini helped an interfaith couple in getting married.

In August 2019, the Delhi High Court ordered police protection for a Shakti Shalini counsellor after an abduction attempt and threats by the live-in partner of a survivor who was given shelter at the Shakti Shalini shelter home with her child.

On August 5, 2019, Kritika*, a counsellor at Shakti Shalini, was withdrawing cash from an ATM near our office in Jangpura, New Delhi, when she was attacked by a group of eight people attempting to abduct her. The attack was led by the former partner of a survivor of sexual and gender-based violence living at Shakti Shalini’s shelter home. Kritika was handling the case, protecting the survivor’s well-being and identity. Despite the presence of several bystanders, she did not get any help when she was attacked. Kritika eventually managed to escape, but her case is not an exception.

*Name changed to maintain confidentiality.

In March 2021, the Delhi High Court ordered police protection for a lesbian woman from Pauri Garhwal, Uttarakhand after having been forced to marry a man against her will and was threatened by her parents to be "cured" of the homosexuality by a religious guru's conversion therapy and "psychic interventions." She had sought help of ANHAD, a fellow NGO, who then referred her to Shakti Shalini shelter home.

In August 2023, the Delhi High Court ordered Shakti Shalini to counsel the parents and the maternal uncle of the survivor, a lesbian woman being in a same-sex relationship, to accept her 'as per her wishes.' The Delhi High Court also granted police protection to the same-sex couple in September 2023.

== Activities ==
- Shakti Shalini runs 24/7 helplines throughout India: landline as well as mobile phone (both phone calls and WhatsApp).
- It provides shelter to survivors and their children.
- It provides counselling.
- It helps survivors in seeking justice from the courts against their abusers.
- It coordinates with the police and statutory bodies like Delhi Commission for Women.

== Programs ==
=== Crisis Intervention and Counseling Centre ===
According to their official website, CICC provides, "[...] counseling, crisis intervention and rescue support, a helpline service, facilitates shelter, mental/ physical/ sexual and reproductive healthcare, legal counseling and litigation aid, rehabilitation and/ or reintegration, and follow-up."

=== Pehchan Shelter Home ===
According to their official website, the Pehchan Shelter Home provides, "[...] counseling and crisis intervention, food and nutrition, sanitation and hygiene, security and confidential location, physical and mental healthcare, sexual and reproductive healthcare, legal counseling and litigation aid, skills development and vocational training, educational and income generation support, rehabilitation and reintegration, and follow-up."

=== Child Protection Unit ===
Child Protection Unit is for children of the survivors at the Shakti Shalini shelter home and children from the abusive households.

TARGET POPULATION

- PHASE 1: Children of adult survivors staying in Pehchan home at Shakti Shalini.
- PHASE 2: Children from households where gender/sexual violence is prevalent, in the five economically and socially marginalized communities in South East district of Delhi.
- PHASE 3: Children of adult survivors connected to Crisis Intervention and Counselling Centre from Delhi NCR.
- PHASE 4: Children of adult survivors connected to Crisis Intervention and Counselling Centre covering pan India.
- PHASE 5: Children of any survivor of gender/sexual violence not necessarily connected to any Shakti Shalini programmes.

== Research ==
=== Unkahi — The Unspoken ===
On 9 March 2023, with the aid from a grant by the non-profit, American Jewish World Service, Shakti Shalini published research and report, Unkahi The Unspoken: A Qualitative Research On Natal Family Violence. It was based on interviews of detailed interviews of women between the ages 18 to 27. The findings of the report highlighted:

- a link between the rise in violence against women by their natal families and the COVID-19 pandemic;
- neglect and discrimination against the daughters by their natal families and preferential treatment towards the sons;
- conditioning of women by their natal families into being a "good girl" (i.e. good girl syndrome); and
- parental policing of the sexuality of women.

The report also shed light on the queer people facing violence from their natal families for being in a same-sex relationship.

== Funding ==
=== Grants ===
- American Jewish World Service.
- Avon Foundation.
- GO Philanthropic Foundation.
- Resilience Fund for Women in Global Chains.
- The Embassy of Luxembourg in India.
- The Greencliffe Foundation.
- Dasra.
- USAID.
- The Embassy of the US in India.
- The Government of India.

=== Corporate Social Responsibility partnerships ===
- Salasar Techno Engineering Ltd. India.
- Essar Cellphone.

=== Foreign contributions ===
Shakti Shalini is licensed and registered under the Indian legislation, Foreign Contribution (Regulation) Act (FCRA) with an active status, for receiving foreign contributions in India.

=== Crowdfunding ===
Shakti Shalini has raised funds on the crowdfunding platform, GoCrowdera.

=== Cause-related marketing ===
The proceeds from every purchase of the NorBlack NorWhite fashion house's 'Aunty' t-shirt, an initiative to reclaim the word 'aunty' that has devolved into a derogatory term for the older women in India, have gone to Shakti Shalini.

== See also ==
- Domestic violence in India
- Dowry system in India
- Violence against women in India
- Feminism in India
- Women in India
- LGBTQ rights in India
- List of non-governmental organisations in India
- Non-governmental organisations in India
