= Zubaan Books =

Indian feminist book publisher

- Parent company: Kali for Women
- Status: Active
- Founded: 2003
- Founder: Urvashi Butalia
- Country of origin: India
- Distribution: Penguin Random House India (India trade); Cambridge University Press (India academic); University of Chicago Press (international print); Diversion Books (international e-books)
- Nonfiction topics: conflict studies, health, human rights, gender justice, history, cultural studies, and feminist and queer theory
- Fiction genres: Many
- Imprints: Many
- Official website: www.zubaanbooks.com

Zubaan Books is India's second feminist publishing house, set up in the year 2003. It is based in New Delhi and publishes fiction, nonfiction, academic and children's books for, by and about women in South Asia. It was founded by Urvashi Butalia and is an imprint of Kali for Women.

== History ==
In 1984, Urvashi Butalia and Ritu Menon founded Kali for Women, India's first feminist publishing house. Both founders had worked in publishing, compiling lists of books for women, and grown frustrated at the lack of women writers published in India. Inspired by the creation of Virago Press and the Feminist Press, they decided to create Kali for Women to support writing by women in India. Its objectives were to publish quality work which meet international standards. Over the years it has become an important publishing house nationally and internationally.

Menon and Butalia separated their business into separate imprints in 2003. Butalia founded Zubaan Books, while Menon created Women Unlimited. In 2011, Butalia and Menon were jointly conferred the Padma Shri award, for their contribution to the nation by Government of India.

Zubaan published a wider range of works than Kali for Women had, focusing primarily on writing about women and women's history, but also adding mainstream fiction, translations, and children's literature. A significant goal of the press was to provide a venue for women's voices to be heard and valued in public. From its beginning, Zubaan provided fresh lunches for employees to avoid the common issue of women employees taking on extra domestic work during their jobs.

Anita Roy joined Zubaan in 2005 and became the publisher of Young Zubaan. She had just had a child and was looking for a flexible publishing job, and Butalia offered for her to join the press and define her own role. Roy focused on creating more interesting, diverse, and nuanced books for children, an area she saw as neglected. Also in 2005, Zubaan and Penguin India began a joint list, with its books written under Zubaan and distributed via Penguin. Penguin India remained the exclusive distributor for Zubaan until at least 2017.

Zubaan's first bestseller was created after a few years: A Life Less Ordinary by Baby Halder. Its financial success allowed Halder to remain writing and Zubaan to keep publishing. Finances were a longstanding worry for Kali for Women and Zubaan, with Butalia stating in 2018 that Zubaan's books sell less than 20,000 copies. At the time, she believed that it was a sign that less feminist literature was needed by their audience, signifying a success for the feminist movement.

Zubaan also acts as a charitable trust carrying out projects on the themes the press publishes about. Its archival projects, like Poster Women and Our Stories Our Words, collect documentation of the history of women's literature and the women's movement in India. Its Cultures of Peace project aims to share the histories of marginalized people, and has helped create documentaries like The Story of Sisterhood.

In 2020, in the wake of the COVID-19 pandemic, Zubaan worked to create PDFs of their entire collection, opening their ebookstore in August 2020. They organised meetings and discussions on Zoom, including sessions on the impact of COVID-19. They also had virtual photo exhibitions, writing workshops, and more.

== Meaning of Zubaan ==
The word 'Zubaan' comes from Hindustani and means, literally, tongue, but it has many other meanings, such as voice, language, speech and dialect. One of the reasons the press is named Zubaan is that it gives a platform for women to share their voices in public, letting them be heard with authority. The company also seeks to reclaim the word from its derogatory usage, when it refers to "women's talk" or "gossip". The press wanted to make the point that dismissed and marginalized people will still have their voices heard.

== Genres and imprints ==
Zubaan has a considerable list of academic books examining issues of gender. It has a growing list of autobiographies of women, the best known of which is A Life Less Ordinary by Baby Halder. As part of its initiative to publish broadbased popular books, Zubaan regularly publishes fiction by women writers. Genres range from literary fiction to science fiction to speculative fiction. Under the imprint of Young Zubaan, there is also a growing list of fiction for the age group 6 to 18 including books like Riddle of the Seventh Stone.

Zubaan also publishes general books: fiction as well as non-fiction that focuses on themes such as conflict studies, health, human rights, gender justice, history, cultural studies, and feminist and queer theory.

The publishing house has also made efforts to promote writings from women authors from the Northeast region of India, for example, the anthology, Centrepiece: New Writing and Art from Northeast India, which features 21 artists and writers within the Northeast region.

== Authors ==
- Baby Halder
- Bama
- Tabish Khair
- Vandana Singh
- Salma
- Priya Sarukkai Chabbria
- Anjum Hasan
- Susan Visvanathan
- Urvashi Butalia
- Mahua Sarkar
- Salim Kidwai
- Janaki Nair
- Payal Dhar
- Uma Chakravarti
- Farah Naqvi
- Radha Kumar
- Anungla Zoe Longkumer
