= Butalia =

Butalia is a surname. Notable people with the surname include:

- Pankaj Butalia (born 1950), Indian documentary filmmaker
- Urvashi Butalia (born 1952), Indian writer
