= Forgotten Refugees =

Forgotten Refugees may refer to:

- Forgotten Refugees (book), a 2022 book by Nandita Haksar
- The Forgotten Refugees, a 2005 documentary film
