= Uma Chakravarti =

Indian historian and filmmaker

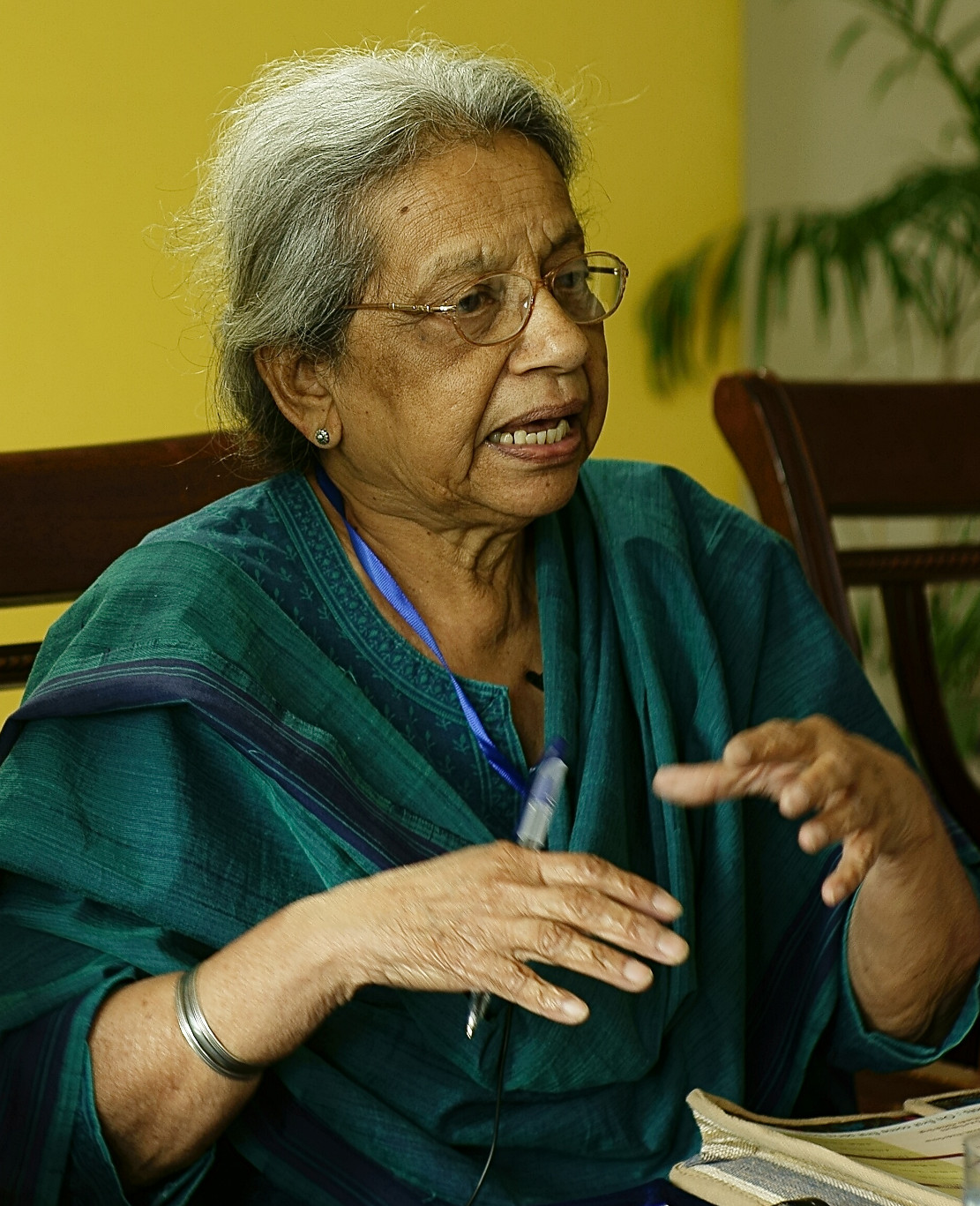
- Chakravarti in 2015
- Born: 20 August 1941 (age 85); Delhi, India
- Spouse: Anand Chakravarti

Academic background
- Education: Benaras Hindu University

Academic work
- Institutions: Miranda House, University of Delhi
- Notable works: Social Dimensions of Early Buddhism; Rewriting History: The Life and Times of Pandita Ramabai

Uma Chakravarti (born 20 August 1941) is an Indian historian and filmmaker. Beginning in the 1980s, Chakravarti wrote extensively on Indian history highlighting issues relating to gender, caste, and class, publishing seven books over the course of her career. Her body of work mostly focused on the history of Buddhism, and that of ancient and 19th century India.

Born to a bureaucrat from Palghat, Kerala, Chakravarti went to school in Delhi and Bangalore. She completed her master's in history from the Benaras Hindu University and ventured into teaching. Chakravarti established a career as an educator at the Miranda House, University of Delhi, where she taught from 1966 to 1998. She published her first book—Social Dimensions of Early Buddhism as a part of her doctorate study in 1987. Her subsequent writings, the most successful of which are Rewriting History: The Life and Times of Pandita Ramabai (1998) and Gendering Caste through a Feminist Lens (2002), have been well received by both the audience and fellow academicians.

A leading scholar of women's and feminist history writing in the subcontinent, she has been called the founding mother of the women's movement in India. Apart from engaging with feminist issues, she has also worked as a democratic rights activist, participating in several fact-finding committees including the International Tribunal on Justice for Gujarat. She also writes newspaper columns on contemporary issues concerning women and human rights.

Chakravarti has also directed four documentary films—A Quiet Little Entry, Fragments of a Past, Ek Inquilab Aur Aaya: Lucknow 1920-1949, and Prison Diaries, all of which focus on, among other issues, women's history in India.

== Early life ==
Uma Chakravarti was born in Delhi on 20 August 1941. Her father was a civil servant, originally from Palghat in Kerala. Uma studied in the Delhi Public School and, later, Mount Carmel College, Bangalore. Afterwards, she studied Law at the College of Law, Bangalore and simultaneously completed a Master's in History from the Benaras Hindu University.

== Career ==
Chakravarti joined the Miranda House, the premier women's college in Delhi University, in 1966. She worked there till 1988, working on Buddhism, early Indian history, 19th-century history and contemporary issues. She authored 7 books and over 50 research articles.

Since the 1970s, Chakravarti has been associated with the women's movement and the movement for democratic rights. She participated in several fact-finding teams to investigate human rights violations, communal riots and state repression.

In most recent work, she has directed two films, one on the life of a child bride Subbulakshmi who went on to participate in the Indian independence movement and the second on the writer Mythili Sivaraman who worked with labouring men and women, documenting their oppressions.

Jawaharlal Nehru University historian Kumkum Roy has edited a volume of scholarly essays in Chakravarti's honour, stating that she had inspired generations of teachers, students and friends. Ashley Tellis from City University of New York adds that she had a profound influence on the lives and careers of scores of young scholars and activists, playing the role of a `founding mother' of Indian feminist history-writing as well as the Indian women's movement.

== Personal life ==
Uma is married to Anand Chakravarti, a sociologist. Together they have a daughter Upali and son Siddhartha. She lives in Delhi along with her husband and daughter.

== Works ==
Books

- Social Dimensions of Early Buddhism (Oxford University Press, 1987). ISBN 8121507499.
- Delhi Riots: Three Days in the Life of a Nation (with Nandita Haksar, Delhi: Lancer International, 1987)
- Rewriting History: The Life and Times of Pandita Ramabai (Kali for Women, 1998). ISBN 9381017948.
- From Myths to Markets: Essays on Gender (with Kumkum Sangari, Indian Institute of Advanced Study, Simla, 1999)
- Gendering Caste through a Feminist Lens (Stree, 2002). ISBN 8185604541.
- Everyday Lives, Everyday Histories: Beyond the Kings and Brahmanas of Ancient India (Tulika Books, 2006). ISBN 8189487043.
- Shadow Lives: Writings on Widowhood (with Preeti Gill, Kali for Women, 2006). ISBN 8186706402.

Selected articles

- “Whatever happened to the Vedic Dasi? Orientalism, nationalism and a script for the past.” in Kumkum Sangari and Sudesh Vaid (eds) Recasting Women: Essays in Colonial History (Kali for Women, 1989). ISBN 0813515807. (Also included in Everyday Lives, Everyday Histories).
- "Is Buddhism the answer to Brahmanical patriarchy?" in Neera Chandhoke (ed) Mapping Histories: Essays Presented to Ravinder Kumar (Tulika, 2000). ISBN 1843310368.
- "A Kashmir diary: Seven days in an armed paradise", in Urvashi Butalia (ed) Speaking Peace: Women's Voices from Kashmir (2003). ISBN 9383074701.
- "Reconceptualising gender: Phule, Brahmanism and Brahmanical patriarchy" in Anupama Rao (ed) Gender & Caste (Zed Books, 2005). ISBN 8188965200.
- "Oppositional imaginations: Multiple lineages of feminist scholarship," in Rekha Pande (ed) A Journey Into Women's Studies: Crossing Interdisciplinary Boundaries (Palgrave Macmillan, 2014). ISBN 9781137395740.

Films

- A Quiet Little Entry
- Fragments of a Past

=== Reception ===
Chakravarti's Social Dimensions of Early Buddhism, based on her doctoral thesis, is regarded as a classic work on ancient India, and is often included in course syllabi of early Indian history courses. Chakravarti based her analysis on the Buddhist texts written in Pali, the language spoken by the commoners in early India. In her later work, she built on this research to reformulate the issues of social stratification, labour, renunciation and domesticity in early India, with a firm focus on gender, caste and class.

Everyday Lives, Everyday Histories is a compilation of 14 essays derived from three decades of work on the history of early India, previously published in various journals and collections. Scholar Shonaleeka Kaul states that the anthology still retains freshness because it represents a "new take on early Indian history," presenting an understanding of the past beyond the vantage of the elite and the orthodox (the "Kings and Brahmanas"). It is the history of the people on the "margins," where margins is translated as "labouring groups including women who labour and women as a wider category." The Introductory chapter offers an account of Chakravarti's own journey through the women's movement as well as her production of India's first feminism-informed histories.
