= Recasting Women: Essays in Colonial History =

1989 book

- 1989 edition cover
- Editors: Kumkum Sangari; Sudesh Vaid
- Language: English
- Genre: Anthology
- Published: 1989
- Publisher: Kali for Women/Zubaan Books, Rutgers University Press
- Publication place: India
- Pages: 372 first edition
- ISBN: 9788185107080 (1989); ISBN 9788189013790 (1989); ISBN 9780813515793 (1990); ISBN 9780813515809 (1990); ISBN 9788186706039 (1997); ISBN 9789381017937 (2013); ISBN 9780813558226 (Web)
- OCLC: 364224922
- Website: https://zubaanbooks.com/shop/recasting-women-essays-in-colonial-history/

Recasting Women: Essays in Colonial History is a 1989 book, edited by Kumkum Sangari and Sudesh Vaid, published by Kali for Women in India and by the Rutgers University Press in the United States. The anthology attempts to explore the inter-relation of patriarchies with political economy, law, religion and culture and to suggest a different history of 'reform' movements, and of class and gender relations. This books is considered to be a landmark contribution by Indian feminist movement.

== Brief introduction ==
=== Formulating gender history ===
Any discussion on rewriting history from perspective of feminists would recognize that history writing is not innocent and transparent practice. It is a situated practice, which is mediated by historians. The social location of the historian (caste, gender, class), his/ her theoretical location and the present context which determines what is considered historical enough to be written. Doing feminist history is not a matter of choice.

According to Joan Scott, the history of women can be studied through three genres of history:

1. History of Inclusion- when the nature of history itself was not questioned. Women were added as women worthies. The early attempts of feminist history writing implied including the women worthies i.e. the women warriors or poets were highlighted to prove that if given space, women could act like men. History was unearthed to make women visible.

2. History of Contribution- In this genre, emphasis was on the fact that women were not only present in history but also participated in determining the course of history. For example, women's contribution to revolutions or nationalist movements.

3. History of Oppression- It was argued that the image of ‘ideal’ woman reinstated women's oppression. Women were recognized as a separate category of analysis in history. Although it created essentialized ahistorical category of women, it is contribution in establishing the fact that women had history.

=== Key arguments ===
The book Recasting Women, in using gender as category of analysis in their study of Colonial India, reworked our notions of social reform. The authors used women's question as entry point to recast our understanding of social reform in colonial India. Thus, the book foregrounds a different kind of gender history. The authors have shown through their studies how the middle class, who spearheaded the social reform movement, was gendered. They have also argued how the public and private sphere was redrawn. Thus they have made clear distinction between gender as category of description and category of analysis. By doing so, they recognized women as a separate category of analysis in history.

As the editors clearly state in their introduction, the book was the outcome of the need to understand the historical processes which reconstitute patriarchy in colonial India, which also bears significance for the present for two reasons:

1. In the two decades preceding the book, post-colonial hope of improving status of women was shattered.

2. The nationalist model of reform and development lost legitimacy.

Thus studying the politics of social change became the subject of feminist inquiry. The authors clearly distinguish between doing women's history and feminist historiography in early India. The latter, they argue, recognizes that every aspect of social reality is gendered.

The book identifies the differences within patriarchies according to class i.e. defining gender was crucial to the formation of classes and dominant ideologies. The process of social restructuring was simultaneous with the process of reconstituting patriarchies. The land resettlements of colonial era gave more power to the landholding groups and pushed the tenants and agricultural labor to further poverty. This had implications for women of both classes, which explains their active participation in peasant struggles in later years. Land ownership and control over means of production remained in hands of men. Moreover, the codification customs into colonial law gave legal sanction to patriarchal practices on marriage, succession and adoption.

The authors argue that the middle class reforms for women were crucial for their cultural nationalism and related to their self-definition of class. It is also about redefining the public and the private sphere. For them, the private was the indigenous alternative to western materialism.

Another significant contribution made in this book is arguing how the new ideal woman was defined in opposition to women from lower class. Thus which women had more access to the public sphere and how, got redrawn for women of both classes.

The authors also assert that both tradition and modernity carry patriarchal ideologies. Therefore, they make argument in favor of understanding them with their complexities, beyond the binary opposition mode.

In the essays that follow, the first one by Uma Chakravarti is about challenging the notion of glorious status of Indian women in ancient India, as constructed by nationalist histories of colonial times. She argues that even if it was to be accepted, it was true only for Aryan women not Vedic dasis. In her essay she looks at how traditions are invented. For the nineteenth century nationalists, the focus was only on upper caste Hindu women in defining the ideal womanhood.

Recasting in colonial period was also influenced by articulations of nationalism i.e. defining what is nation and claiming power. The pre-independent Indian nationalism demanded participation of women in political sphere. By the late nineteenth century, cultural nationalism was articulated. The idea of nation was determined on basis of cultural superiority, on the basis of which the claim for self-rule was made. In this period, because culture is considered superior, there was opposition to social reforms, unlike in the previous century when women's issues were central to social reforms. As if the women's question did not exist. This is what Partha Chatterjee calls in his essay, the nationalist resolution of women's question.

However, as the authors themselves admit in the introduction, the limitation of the book lies in its lack of representativeness. The essays are confined to the dominant Hindu community, mostly from North India and mainly about middle classes. Despite its limitation, the book is held by common concern for changing position of women both in its material specificity and in the inverse representations within discourses which legitimize their social status. Thus it is useful for further studies on reconstitution of patriarchies.

== Reviews ==
David Kopf has reviewed this book in The Journal of Interdisciplinary History. In his review, he observes:

"Methodologically, Recasting Women breaks new ground in the historiography of the nineteenth-century renaissance in Bengal because it substitutes colonial discourse for empirical history... The radical point of departure for the feminists in the volume is their contention that the common theme of female emancipation during the renaissance is false. Unlike an earlier generation of Indian feminists who applauded the last century's efforts to abolish sati, child marriage, and Kulin polygamy at the same time it encouraged widow remarriage and higher education for women, today's radical feminists accuse the British of lacking compassion for women and the Bengalis for being hypocritical patriarchs."
