= A Life Less Ordinary (disambiguation) =

A Life Less Ordinary may refer to:

== Film ==
- A Life Less Ordinary, 1997 romantic black comedy film

== Music ==
- Soundtrack to the film A Life Less Ordinary
- "A Life Less Ordinary" (song), non-album single released by the band Ash

== Television ==
- "A Life Less Ordinary", an episode of the British medical drama television series Casualty

== Other uses ==
- Aalo Aandhari (A Life Less Ordinary), the autobiography of Baby Halder

== See also ==
- "Life Less Ordinary", a song by Carbon Leaf from the album Indian Summer
- Life Less Ordinary, a Singaporean drama series
