= Shakti Shalini =

Shakti Shalini may refer to :

- Shakti Shalini (upcoming film)
- Shakti Shalini (NGO)
