= Aalo Aandhari (A Life Less Ordinary) =

Autobiography of Baby Halder

- Author: Baby Halder
- Translator: Urvashi Butalia
- Language: Hindi
- Genre: Autobiography
- Publisher: Roshnai Prakashan
- Publication date: 2002
- Publication place: India

Aalo Aandhari is the autobiography of Baby Halder, a domestic worker who battled poverty, hardship, violence and after a lot of struggle finally managed to make a name for herself as a writer. The book traces Baby's difficult life since she was abandoned by her mother and left with a cruel, abusive father at a very young age. Married at twelve to an abusive man twice her age and a mother at fourteen, her life was marked by overwhelming challenges. Exhausted and desperate, she fled with her three children to Delhi, to work as a maid in some of the city's wealthiest homes. Expected to serve her employers' every demand, she faced a staggering workload that often left her no time to care for her own children.

== Background ==
When Prabodh Kumar, a retired professor of anthropology and a grandson of Munshi Premchand found his new 29-year-old Bengali maid Baby Haldar's busy hands still as she dusted the books, he encouraged her to read. She first picked up Taslima Nasreen's Amar Meyebela (My Girlhood). Novels by Ashapurna Devi, Mahashweta Devi, Buddhadeb Guha followed. Kumar went out one day and bought her a pen and copybook and asked her to write. So she picked up the pen, with the same curious blend of grim determination and blind faith, covering the first few pages as painstakingly as if it was yet one more chore in her busy day. Soon a lot more pages followed and with editorial help from Kumar and his friends, Ashok Seksariya and Ramesh Goswami and the result was a memoir.

== Synopsis ==
Exhausted by her husband's extended absences and his failure to provide for the family, Baby's mother goes out to the market and never returns. Baby is four years old. Her father is insensitive and abusive, beating her up for inconsequential reasons like telling a school friend that there was no food in the house. He brings home one “new mother” after another never thinking about how it affects the children.

Baby's intermittent spells of schooling are cut short by money shortages and domestic chaos. Her elder sister is abruptly married off because their father can no longer afford to keep her. Baby follows suit in helping cut costs of feeding another hungry mouth. At a young age of 12, her father marries her off to a man twice her age. Baby is too young to understand the significance of the preparations for her own marriage and prefers to play with her friends in the street instead. After meeting her future husband, Baby tells a friend: “It will be a good thing to be married. At least I will get to have a feast.” Even in the hours before her wedding, she writes, “I’d sing and jump about and play.”

A realization of the horror of her new married life comes suddenly. Soon she is pregnant and two more children follow; then her husband splits her head open with a rock after he sees her speaking with another man, and her elder sister is beaten and strangled by her own husband. Baby decides to walk out on her marriage. She flees on a train to Delhi, where, like many other desperate women, she seeks work cleaning the homes of the capital's rising middle class. There she escapes destitution by sending her eldest son out as an under-age domestic servant and by working for abusive employers. Her bosses treat her harshly, forcing her to lock her children in the attic all day while she works.

== Translations ==
Originally written in Bengali, the book was first published in Hindi as Aalo Aandhari by Roshnai Prakashan in 2002. It was later translated by writer and publisher Urvashi Butalia into English, and published as 'A Life Less Ordinary' by Zubaan Books in collaboration with Penguin Books in 2006. The book has been translated into 25 languages.

== Reception ==
Aalo Aandhari was a historic publication in India. Domestic workers were part of a marginalized class and had not had access to the publishing industry, making Halder's book one of the first by a domestic worker to receive mainstream publication. The memoir brought international press attention to Halder, and she toured several other countries. Aalo Aandhari received praise for how it depicted Halder's empowerment from a lens of critical feminism, and was cited as a key piece of Dalit women's literature.

Yoko Taguchi praised the memoir's nuanced depictions of her complicated and often-violent relationships with family, employers, friends, and enighbors. The New York Times called the English translation a moving description of the experiences of many marginalized Indian women, but said that the plot was confusing. Kirkus Reviews called the translation memorable and painful, using simple prose that sometimes switches from first to third person during difficult experiences. They thought the translation's choice to leave certain terms and relationships untranslated made it hard for English readers to follow the memoir.

Due to the success of Aalo Aandhari, Halder's life changed drastically. She wrote a second book, Isat Rupantar, documenting the changes her writing had brought to her life. Halder recounted that some other domestic workers had credited her writing as an inspiration for their own entry into writing.
