= Medha Shri Dahiya =

Indian journalist

Medha Shri
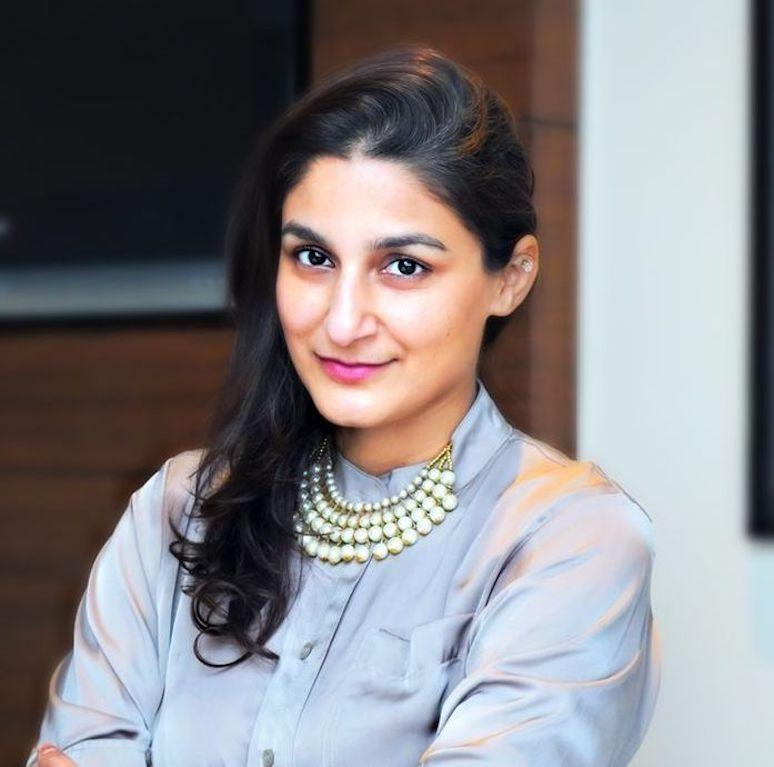
- Citizenship: Indian
- Education: Miranda House
- Occupation: Journalist

Medha Shri Dahiya or Medha Shri is an Indian journalist. She has worked in the media industry for 15 years with a focus on global literature, multidisciplinary arts, human experience, social issues, creative lifestyle, Hindi film industry and leadership

She was the Students' Union President of Miranda House. She studied at Motilal Nehru School of Sports, Rai.

== Career ==
Dahiya has worked with largest Indian English daily The Times of India and Hindustan Times. She served as the India Head of Customer Success at Wildr, a troll-free social media app. In 2020, she took charge as the editor-in-chief, os.me, a blogging platform. Later, she worked at Explurger as Content and Communications Head. Explurger is a social media application co- founded by Sonu Sood.

In 2025, she was appointed the Editor for socials, creative IPs and specials for Hindustan Times EFL.

She is an advisor of Kalinga Literary Festival. She is on the advisory board of NGO, Meals of Happiness.

== Controversy ==
In an interview, Dahiya quoted hairstylist Sapna Bhavnani saying, "Salman Khan dances like a monkey in stupid movies." After the interview appeared in Hindustan Times, Sapna was bashed online. Sapna then landed in a Twitter fight with Medha Shri. Sapna accused Dahiya of using 'clickbaity title'. This was widely covered by media houses. Later, in an article in Hindustan Times titled "Hey! ‘Unethical’ Media, You Didn't Misquote Me. And I will Sulk", Dahiya wrote, '[Sapna Bhabnani] insisted she was saying so ‘on record’, and repeatedly said, ‘you can quote me on this... you quote me on this’, while giving this particular quote.

In an article in The Times of India, Dahiya broke the news that Indian film actors Sushmita Sen and Preity Zinta had enrolled for Bachelor's Degree at School of Open Learning, Delhi University, but withdrew their admission without completing their degrees.

In an exclusive report for Hindustan Times, journalist Medha Shri reported that boxer MC Mary Kom and her husband, Onler Kom, had separated. The report also cited speculation that Mary Kom was involved in a relationship with the husband of another boxer. The story was subsequently reported by several other media outlets. Following the publication of the report, Mary Kom issued a statement on her X account confirming that she and Onler Kom were living separately. She stated that she had sought a divorce under Kom customary law and denied reports alleging an extramarital relationship. In her statement, she said she was responding to the Hindustan Times article. In a later interview with Medha Shri, Onler Kom alleged that Mary Kom had engaged in multiple extramarital relationships during their marriage and stated that their children were upset about one of the individuals involved. Mary Kom has denied allegations of an affair.
