= Satya Rani Chadha =

Indian women's rights activist (1933-2014)

Satya Rani Chadha (1933 ca. – 1 July 2014) was a women's rights activist. She is known for launching the anti dowry movement in India in the 1980s together with fellow activist Shahjahan Aapa. Both women were mothers whose daughters were killed as a result of dowry disputes, and for decades campaigned for justice and to change dowry practices in India. Together they founded Shakti Shalini, a Delhi-based refuge and women's rights organisation and combating dowry-related and gender based violence. Chadha is a recipient of the Neerja Bhanot Award.

== Killing of Shashi Bala and battle for justice ==
In 1979, Satya Rani Chadha's twenty year old daughter, Shashi Bala (also known as Kanchanbala), died of severe burn injuries while at home, a victim of bride burning. She had been married less than a year and was six months pregnant at time of her death. Chadha could not afford to give the full dowry request to the family of her daughter's husband, which included demands for a scooter, a television, and a refrigerator. Still, Chadha managed to pay some money towards the television and gave a refrigerator. Even so, two days before her daughter's death, Chadha's son-in-law, Subhash Chandra, warned her of dire consequences if the demand for the rest of the dowry (the scooter) was not met. He denied involvement with the death, but suspecting her daughter was killed due to the partly unfulfilled dowry request, Chadha reported the death as murder.

The police neglected to gather basic evidence and charged Chandra not with murder, but under the Dowry Prohibition Act. This led the Supreme Court to rule in 1980 that because Chandra's demands for a scooter came ten months after the marriage, it could not be connected to the death. Chadha continued to pursue a suit for murder, but it took until 2000 for the case to be heard in court. Chandra was eventually convicted of the lesser charge of abetting a suicide in 2000. On appeal his conviction was upheld in 2013, and was ordered to serve a seven-year sentence. He failed to hand himself in and has not served the sentence.
