= Gaiti Hasan =

Indian scientist (born 1956)

Gaiti Hasan (born November 1956) is an Indian scientist who researches in the fields of Drosophila genetics, neuroscience and intra cellular calcium signalling. She is expert in Reverse genetics. Hasan is a Fellow of the Indian National Science Academy (INSA), the apex body of Indian scientists and technologists. From 2013 onwards she has been serving as a Senior Professor at the National Centre for Biological Sciences (NCBS), Bangalore.

== Education ==
Hasan studied in Aligarh as a child. Her parents taught at university, and her two sisters studied chemistry and physics. She went on to do a BSc in zoology from Miranda House, Delhi University in 1976. She completed a MSc in life sciences in 1978 and a M.Phil. in 1980 from Jawaharlal Nehru University, Delhi. In 1983, she received a PhD from the University of Cambridge for her dissertation on ribosomal RNA genes of Trypanosoma brucei. According to Hasan, it was while she was applying to universities for her PhD that she realised for the first time that "belonging to a minority could lead to discrimination". She believes this has led her to "consciously try and be supportive of other woman scientists, be they students or colleagues".

== Career ==
Presently she works at NCBS (National Centre for Biological Sciences) where she researches on the systemic and cellular consequences of changes in intracellular calcium levels in animals. In 1983, Hasan joined the Tata Institute of Fundamental Research (TIFR) in Mumbai, as a visiting fellow and research associate in the molecular biology unit. She was a visiting scientist at the biology department in Brandeis University Massachusetts in 1992.

== Awards and recognition ==
Hasan has received a scholarship from the Inlaks Foundation, a British Overseas Research Student Award, a fellowship from the Wellcome Trust and a Rockefeller Biotechnology Career Fellowship. In 2006, she was elected a Fellow of the Indian Academy of Sciences, Bangalore and in 2007, as a Member of the Asia-Pacific Molecular Biology Network. She is also a fellow of Indian National Science Academy (INSA). In 2019, she received Sir M. Visvesvaraya Lifetime Achievement Award for senior scientists and engineers from Government of Karnataka, India.

== Publications ==
1. Deb, Bipan Kumar; Pathak, Trayambak; Hasan, Gaiti (26 May 2016). "Store-independent modulation of Ca2+ entry through Orai by Septin 7". Nature Communications. 7 11751. Bibcode:2016NatCo...711751D. doi:10.1038/ncomms11751. PMC 4894974. PMID 27225060.
2. Pathak, T.; Agrawal, T.; Richhariya, S.; Sadaf, S.; Hasan, G. (2015). "Store-Operated Calcium Entry through Orai is Required for Transcriptional Maturation of the Flight Circuit in Drosophila". Journal of Neuroscience. 35 (40): 13784–99. doi:10.1523/JNEUROSCI.1680-15.2015. PMC 6605383. PMID 26446229.
3. Agrawal, Tarjani; Hasan, Gaiti (2015). "Maturation of a central brain flight circuit in Drosophilarequires Fz2/Ca2+signaling". eLife. 4. doi:10.7554/eLife.07046. PMC 4451221. PMID 25955970.
4. Sadaf, Sufia; Reddy, O. Venkateswara; Sane, Sanjay P.; Hasan, Gaiti (2015). "Neural Control of Wing Coordination in Flies". Current Biology. 25 (1): 80–6. doi:10.1016/j.cub.2014.10.069. PMID 25496964.
5. Agrawal, Tarjani; Sadaf, Sufia; Hasan, Gaiti (2013). "A Genetic RNAi Screen for IP3/Ca2+ Coupled GPCRs in Drosophila Identifies the PdfR as a Regulator of Insect Flight". PLOS Genetics. 9 (10) e1003849. doi:10.1371/journal.pgen.1003849. PMC 3789835. PMID 24098151.
6. Subramanian, M.; Metya, S. K.; Sadaf, S.; Kumar, S.; Schwudke, D.; Hasan, G. (2013). "Altered lipid homeostasis in Drosophila InsP3 receptor mutants leads to obesity and hyperphagia". Disease Models & Mechanisms. 6 (3): 734–744. doi:10.1242/dmm.010017. PMC 3634656. PMID 23471909.
7. Hasan, Gaiti (2013). "Intracellular signaling in neurons: Unraveling specificity, compensatory mechanisms and essential gene function". Current Opinion in Neurobiology. 23 (1): 62–7. doi:10.1016/j.conb.2012.07.004. PMID 22878162. S2CID 206951235.
8. Chakraborty, Sumita; Hasan, Gaiti (2012). "Functional Complementation of Drosophila itpr Mutants by RatItpr1". Journal of Neurogenetics. 26 (3–4): 328–37. doi:10.3109/01677063.2012.697501. PMID 22817477. S2CID 29461952.
9. Agrawal, N.; Venkiteswaran, G.; Sadaf, S.; Padmanabhan, N.; Banerjee, S.; Hasan, G. (2010). "Inositol 1,4,5-Trisphosphate Receptor and dSTIM Function in Drosophila Insulin-Producing Neurons Regulates Systemic Intracellular Calcium Homeostasis and Flight". Journal of Neuroscience. 30 (4): 1301–13. doi:10.1523/JNEUROSCI.3668-09.2010. PMC 6633787. PMID 20107057.
10. Venkiteswaran, G.; Hasan, G. (2009). "Intracellular Ca2+ signaling and store-operated Ca2+ entry are required in Drosophila neurons for flight". Proceedings of the National Academy of Sciences. 106 (25): 10326–10331. Bibcode:2009PNAS..10610326V. doi:10.1073/pnas.0902982106. PMC 2700899. PMID 19515818.
