= Motilal Nehru School of Sports =

Sports University of Haryana (former Motilal Nehru School of Sports)

Location
- Rai, Sonipat, Haryana, 131029; India; 28.9249451°N 77.1061715°E

Information
- School type: Sports School
- Motto: 'Urdhvo bhava' (Rise high)
- Founded: 1973
- School district: Sonipat
- Grades: 5-12
- Campus: 300 acres
- Houses: Indra, Soma, Surya, Varuna
- Affiliation: UGC and CBSE
- Website: http://www.mnssrai.com

Sports University of Haryana (SUH), formerly Motilal Nehru School of Sports, is a boarding university located in Rai in Sonipat district of Haryana state of India.

== History ==
In July 1973, Motilal Nehru School of Sports was founded by the Government of Haryana. The school is organized on the public school pattern. It is fully residential and co-educational. The school is a member of the Indian Public Schools Conference and affiliated to the Central Board of Secondary Education for the Secondary (Class X) and Senior Secondary (Class XII) Examinations. It is ranked amongst the top 10 boarding schools in the country as per the education world rankings 2016.

On 14 February 2019, the cabinet of Haryana announced it's conversion to state-funded sports university named Sports University of Haryana in the school's existing campus. The bill to set up university was passed by assembly in August 2019. In 2022, it was finally established as a university under the State Legislative Act, 21 of 2022, recognized under 2(f) of the UGC Act, 1956.

== Recognition ==
The university is recognised by UGC.

The school is organized on the public school pattern as a member of the Indian Public Schools Conference and affiliated to the Central Board of Secondary Education for the Secondary (Class X) and Senior Secondary (Class XII) Examinations. It is ranked amongst the top 10 boarding schools in the country as per the education world rankings 2016.

From July 2025 to July 2026, Professor Yogesh Chander, the dean of Academic Affairs at the Sports University of Haryana, was appointed as the International Ambassador for the International Organisation for Health, Sports, and Kinesiology (IOHSK).

== University ==
It runs the following courses:

- PhD in Physical Education
- Master of Physical Education and Sports (M.P.E.S), 2 years course
- Post-Graduate Diploma in Sports Coaching PGDSC (Athletics, Badminton, Basketball, Boxing, Cricket, Football, Handball, Kabaddi, Lawn-Tennis, Volleyball, Wrestling, Yoga, Judo, Swimming, Hockey, Shooting, Fencing, Taekwondo), 1 year course
- Post-Graduate Diploma in other Disciplines (Sports Psychology, Sports Nutrition, Sports Management, Strength and Conditioning, Sports Journalism & Mass Communication), 1 year course.
- Bachelor of Physical Education and Sports (B.P.E.S), 4 years.
- Bachelor of Science B.Sc. (Sports Science), 4 years.

== School ==
=== Institutional Framework ===
The administration of the Motilal Nehru School of Sports is vested in a Special Board for the Haryana. The expenditure on academics and sports is heavily subsidised by the state Government. School is a prestigious boarding school. Students participate and compete with various public schools some of the counterparts are Sainik school, Rastriya Indian Military College, Mayo College, The Doon School, Welham Boys' School and Scindia School. Students have given an outstanding performance in sports at various national level tournaments. School also aims to prepare students for entry into the National Defence Academy (NDA). More than 400 students from the school have qualified in Indian Armed Forces so far .

=== Staff ===
The academic and administrative head of the school is the Principal and Director. He is assisted by the Vice- Principal and Bursar (Administrative Officer). Sports coaches are drawn from three sources: The school, The Sports Authority of India and The Sports Department, Haryana. The teaching staff consists of fully qualified and trained teachers with the necessary attributes and aptitude to work in a residential school.

== Notable alumni ==
- Krupali Patel
- Medha Shri Dahiya
- Meghna Malik
- Randeep Hooda

== See also ==
- List of institutions of higher education in Haryana
- Dominence of Haryana in sports
