= The History of Doing =

Book by Radha Kumar

- Cover of 8th edition
- Author: Radha Kumar, Photo Research by Kali for Women
- Language: English
- Subject: Women's rights
- Genre: Non-fiction
- Published: 1993
- Publication place: India
- ISBN: 9780860914556

The History of Doing: An Illustrated Account of Movements for Women's Rights and Feminism in India 1800–1990 is a book by Radha Kumar. First published in 1993 in New Delhi by Kali for Women after a Norwegian organisation's grant of Rs 1.4 lakh, and later published by Zubaan (an imprint of Kali) and Verso, the illustrated book is "a brief interpretative history of women's movements in India from the beginning of the nineteenth century until the present day", as the first line of the introduction concisely conveys.

Divided into 12 chapters and four other sections—dedication, acknowledgements, conclusion and index—the original edition of the book spans 203 pages. The book can broadly be distinguished into two main parts, women in India during time of the British Empire and then the period after India gained independence.

According to a book review in Socialist Review, "What makes the book more intriguing is the way it is broken up with copies of leaflets, reprints of posters, boxes with the life histories of some of the women involved and lots of pictures of activities." The pictures of protesting women tells a story in itself and is a peek into "what the liberating power of mass activity means." Tulsi Patel (Note: Tulsi Patel from the Department of Sociology in Jamia Milia Islamia) notes the same in the Sociological Bulletin (Note: Sociological Bulletin is the official journal of the Indian Sociological Society currently published by SAGE) about the visual anthropology in her review of the book, adding that the book is enriched by photographs, bills, debates and other issues put inside the boxes.

== Description ==
Kumar raises important issues about the women's movement in India and the kind of issues the movement has taken up such as sati, child marriage, domestic violence, remarriage, girl education, rape, dowries, women in politics, health and environmental destruction as well as the directions and perspectives it has taken. She gives counter-arguments and differences to the claim that the women's movement in India is an unnecessary import from the West and also discuses the effect of population control and changes in the caste system on Indian women. Tulsi Patel, from the Department of Sociology in Jamia Milia Islamia, notes how the book surveys "campaigns, organizations and personalities in the light of the issues that become prominent in different contexts."

Bhikaji Cama with the Stuttgart flag, (Note: The Stuttgart flag refers to the "Flag of Indian Independence" raised by Bhikhaiji Cama on 22 August 1907, at the International Socialist Conference in Stuttgart, Germany.) 1907. The image can be found on page 46 of the book.

Kumar notes how during the 19th century India was flooded with social reform influences and internal change was taking place. The position of a woman in all aspects was being discussed; by men at the forefront too. Child marriage, the ban on the remarriage of widows, the practice of sati, girl education all needed addressing by society; and addressed they were. Landmark instances are elaborated such as that of Rakhmabai and her legal case of her marriage as a child bride; wherein she refused to obey the appeal courts decision against her in 1884, preferred paying the hefty fine and went on to become a doctor from England; after which she came back to India and continued practicing medicine. Another case elaborated on during the time of British rule is it that of the sharecroppers' movement in the 1940s where women in the thousands were active in the protests. She also notes how some women joined guerilla armies.

She points out how things changed a lot after Independence. Women understood well that their needs and wants were not being taken notice of by lawmakers. The 1970s saw various women's movements like those against the sale of alcohol at village level and larger campaigns against sati, dowry deaths and rape. Kumar describes personal experiences such as the shock of coming face to face with an orthodox Hindu protest, with many women part of it, in favour of sati. Upasana Mahanta writes in the EPW that Radha Kumar's book "records the ways in which ordinary women rework traditional practices to their advantage negotiating "concessions" from husbands, families, communities and so on that were otherwise not accessible to them."

Since publication the book has been widely read and has become a part of syllabi readings for a PG Diploma Women's Empowerment, GGS Indraprastha University, as well as in the Women's Studies Centre for a PG Diploma in Women's Studies.
