= Kali for Women =

Indian feminist book publisher

- Status: Dissolved
- Founded: 1984; 42 years ago
- Founders: Urvashi Butalia; Ritu Menon
- Defunct: 2003; 23 years ago
- Successor: Zubaan Books; Women Unlimited
- Country of origin: India
- Publication types: Books

Kali for Women was a start-up feminist publisher in India founded by Urvashi Butalia and Ritu Menon. It was arguably the first Indian press dedicated to publishing works by, for, and about women.

== History ==
Kali for Women was founded by Urvashi Butalia and Ritu Menon in 1984. Butalia had previously worked with Oxford University Press and Zed Books in Delhi, while Ritu Menon was a scholar. The pair met when Menon was working on a list of women's books for Vikas, and Butalia was working on a list for Zed. Butalia was frustrated that she could not find many works written by women and published in India. Seeing the creation of Virago Press and the Feminist Press elsewhere, she decided to create an Indian women's publishing house with Menon.

Menon and Butalia's goal was to make Indian women's voices heard by publishing academic works, activists' writings, translations, and fiction. Kali for Women was associated with the international women in print movement, which aimed to create autonomous alternative communications networks created by and for women.

They started with very little capital, working out of Menon's garage. A few small grants enabled their first publication. They did not pay themselves, and they created multiple income streams to sustain the organization, including making books for the Festivals of India. Their own books each cost about Rs 60,000 to publish. Kali for Women eventually moved to an office in Hauz Khas and hired an employee, Jose Anthony, to help with administrative work.

In 2003, the founders parted ways. Butalia set up Zubaan Books in 2003, which publishes fiction, general interest books and children's titles in addition to feminist titles. Menon founded Women Unlimited.

== Publications ==
Widely regarded as India's answer to Virago Press, Kali for Women published some pathbreaking titles, among them the Hindi reference book Shareer ki Jankari ("About the Body"). Shareer ki Jankari was written by 75 village women and sold by them at a special price in the villages. Shareer ki Jankari was extremely frank about sex and women's bodies including issues such as menstrual taboos, shocking some commentators.

Previously, academic presses had largely ignored the markets for cheap, mass literature popularized by Kali for Women. Butalia recalled that feminist literature and writing by women was also neglected when Kali for Women began. She said that she had to work to reassure herself and their women authors that their writing mattered.

Kali for Women published Radha Kumar's The History of Doing (1993), the ecofeminist Vandana Shiva's landmark work Staying Alive (1988), and Kumkum Sangari and Sudesh Vaid's landmark Recasting Women: Essays in Colonial History (1989).

== Award ==
In 2011, Urvashi Butalia and Ritu Menon were jointly conferred the Padma Shri award, for their contribution to the nation by the Government of India.

== See also ==
- Women in India
- Women in print movement
