= Shahjehan Aapa =

Indian women's rights activist

- Born: 1936
- Died: September 8, 2013 (aged 76–77)
- Occupation: Women's rights activist
- Known for: Feminist activism, co-founding Shakti Shalini

Shahjehan Aapa (1936 – September 8, 2013) was a women’s rights activist from India. After one of her daughters was murdered in a dowry death, Aapa was inspired to start a life of feminist activism, working alongside other Indian women and mothers to combat dowry murders, redress, and sexism in India. In 1987, Shahjehan Aapa co-founded the organization Shakti Shalini, which, centered in New Delhi, works to combat gender-based violence and provide support to thousands of Indian women.

Her life's work has been detailed by the University of Michigan's Global Feminisms Project, a series of oral history interviews with feminist activists and organizers.

== Early life and education ==
Shahjehan Aapa’s birth parents were killed during the 1947 Partition of India when she was 11 years old. Along with her sister, she grew up in a rural, impoverished neighborhood in Mathura, India with a foster family. Her foster parents allowed her to attend Madarsa, a religious Muslim primary school where she received a basic education on the Koran and Urdu.

At age 14, she was married against her will to the son of her foster parents. She completed the majority of the household’s agrarian and domestic labor, including tending to the buffalo and cows on their property. If she ever refused to complete a chore, her husband would verbally abuse and physically assault Shahjehan. In total, she had seven sons and two daughters with her husband before leaving the marriage.

After their divorce, she moved to Delhi where her sister lived. She made enough to raise her children by doing needlework and stitching for a modest living.

== Feminist activism ==
=== Daughter's death ===
Shahjehan’s feminist activism was ignited when her daughter, Noorjehan, was murdered in a dowry death in Nangloi, Delhi in 1979. For months prior, Noorjehan had informed Shahjehan that her in-laws would cease their harassment if they were paid sufficient funding. When Shahjehan could not come up with the money, Noorjehan was beaten, doused in kerosene, and ignited on fire inside her home.

In the immediate aftermath, Shahjehan demanded the family be imprisoned. Shahjehan and local members of the community even staged a rally in front of the local police station on the matter. The local police insisted a report had been filed, yet upon reading the file she was horrified to find out the report claimed Noorjehan was suffering from clinical depression and likely committed suicide. Similar to the experience of many before her, neither the police nor the judiciary system addressed her grievances in a sufficient manner. She spent three years attempting to have the criminal court try her case, but due to widespread corruption in the police department, it was never successful. The overwhelming grief she experienced, in combination with the failures of the justice system, encouraged her to step out of the domestic sphere and enter feminist organizing, specifically focused on mitigating domestic violence.

=== Shakti Shalini ===
Shahjehan initially pursued political activism through her work in Basti, a government panel, where she aided homeless women seeking legal aid. This was frustrating work, as Shahjehan was often unable to help the women resolve their specific dowry or abuse cases. Her fellow coworker, Satya Rani Chadha, informed Shahjehan that 25 women were organizing a gathering to advocate for legal action in these cases and raise funds for the victims' medical expenses. This group began regularly meeting under the name Parents Association of Dowry Victims, but soon developed into Shakti Shalini, a non-governmental organization (NGO) that was co-founded by Shahjehan and Satya in January 1987 in Delhi. The NGO was named after Shahjehan's work in a memorable case of a woman from Rajasthan named Shanti, who had been thrown off the third floor of a building by her partner. Shahjehan's investment in this case was so profound that she missed her own hearing, causing her personal case to be terminated. The group began by campaigning for legislation to protect victims of domestic violence, demanding institutional adjustments. However, the focal point of the organization's advocacy quickly developed more generally into ensuring proper housing for women, educating exploited women, and promoting gender equality. This shift was due to Shahjehan's perspective that institutions, such as the judicial system, would not create worthwhile change but only perpetuate it. Instead, Shakti Shalini took a highly individualized approach to their advocacy by holding discussions, workshops, and demonstrations to improve the articulation of victims' rights and stories.

The group's first shelter was opened in July 1987 with Shahjehan overseeing operations as the NGO's founder and president. The shelter began offering 90+ days of safe haven for victims and their children, eventually becoming a place where the local police referred women to. To this day, Shakti Shalini focuses on combating gender-based violence and community activism, specifically prioritizing providing assistance to women and younger girls in the form of shelter, counseling, legal aid, education, and vocational training. The group organizes jobs for women as they finish schooling, or helps them prepare for their exams if they are still in school (many in secondary school or college). The NGO continues to stay in touch with the women for years after their initial job placement, even aiding the children of these women and offering educational courses or shelter to them, when necessary. These courses are not only academically beneficial, but also contain feminist ideology to promote independence. Some women are brought to Shakti Shalini who don’t want to work, so the NGO also arranges marriages to appropriate families. The organization receives government grants for food and shelter, and donations specifically for education, to fund its operations. According to their website, Shakti Shalini has aided over 15,000+ individuals over the course of 36 years, with the organization having placements in at least 5 marginalized communities within New Delhi.

== Death ==
On September 28, 2013, Shahjehan Aapa died at the age of 77. On the way to a mahila panchayat, a women’s community initiative to end violence and provide redress, Shahjehan was struck by a motor vehicle and killed in the accident.
