= Shyamala Pappu =

Indian lawyer (1933–2016)

- Born: 21 May 1933; India
- Died: 7 September 2016 (aged 83); Delhi, India
- Occupation: Lawyer
- Children: Krishnaamorthi Pappu
- Awards: Padma Shri

Shyamala Pappu (21 May 1933 – 7 September 2016) was an Indian lawyer and a senior counsel practicing in the Supreme Court of India. She was a member of the Law Commission of India and had participated in several conferences, delivering keynote addresses. An alumnus of the Miranda House of the University of Delhi, she was a member of the Supreme Court Bar Association of India and a former member of the Independent Commission on Development and Health in India (ICDHI). She had also served as a member of the Governing Council of her alma mater, Miranda House, during 1973–74. The Government of India awarded her the fourth highest civilian honour of the Padma Shri, in 2009, for her contributions to society. She died on 7 September 2016.
