= Pinjra Tod =

Collective of female students in Delhi

- Break the Cage
- पिंजरा तोड़
- Founded at: Delhi, India
- Key people: Natasha Narwal
- Website: pinjratod.wordpress.com

Pinjra Tod (Break the Cage) is a collective of women students and alumni of colleges from across Delhi, India, that seeks to make regulations for hostel and paying guest (PG) accommodation less restrictive for women students. They aim to counter a perceived official narrative that women need to be protected. Challenging what they consider to be the CCTV-driven police-security complex, Pinjra Tod demands that concepts of safety and security not be used to silence women's right to mobility and liberation.

The main goals of Pinjra Tod are to end the imposition of curfews on women, to provide affordable accommodation for women, to regularise the situation for paying guests, and to obtain the formation of elected Internal Complaint Committees for prevention, prohibition and redress of sexual harassment in universities.

== Background ==
In 2015, when Delhi's universities reopened after the summer break, Jamia Millia Islamia issued a notice stating that the female students of the college could no longer request permission to stay out later than 8 pm. The Delhi Commission for Women (DCW) challenged this, asking why the college administration thought it necessary to impose such a restriction.

A group of women students identified the reaction of DCW as an opening to make interventions at other universities in Delhi, rather than just Jamia. They decided to circulate a petition to extend the discourse sparked by the Jamia incident, questioning the exclusive and exclusionary treatment that they believe applies in university spaces. Pinjra Tod mobilised people around several issues faced by female residents of hostels and PGs such as curfews, policies that apply to only women, moral policing, higher prices for women's hostels, among others. It is also focused on ensuring that universities establish a sexual harassment committee, as mandated by University Grant Commission (UGC) guidelines in 2006.

Since then, the movement has seen participation from students of several colleges, especially from Delhi University, such as Jamia Milia Islamia, Miranda House, Ambedkar University Delhi, Hindu College, Lady Shriram College for Women, St. Stephen's College, and Delhi Technical University. The movement has garnered momentum across the country, with students from several colleges, such as NIT Calicut, IIT-Roorkee, Punjabi University, RMNLU Lucknow, using the Pinjra Tod to challenge patriarchal policies women face in their campuses.

== Activities ==
The petition organised by Pinjra Tod was submitted to the DCW on 10 October 2015 and was preceded on 8 October by a protest march in the North Campus of Delhi University to symbolically reclaim the night.

Reacting to a claim by Smriti Irani, the Minister of Human Resource Development who had said "women in India are not told what to wear, whom to meet and where to go", on 24 October 2015, Pinjra Tod called for a protest at her ministry offices. Titled "FYI Smriti Irani", it saw the minister presented with copies of rule-books from various hostels.

On 16 December 2015, Pinjra Tod organised a multi-city protest called Bus Teri Meri, Chal Saheli, three years after the 2012 Delhi gang rape. The idea was to use public transport at night and reconfigure public spaces which are always already assumed to be posing a danger to women. The initiative challenged the patriarchal ideology which imagines women only in terms of violence in the discourse of violation of security. Parallel demonstrations took place in Allahabad, Kolkata, Pune, Bangalore, Delhi, Darjeeling, Chandigarh and Patiala. Similar protests were repeated in December 2016, where women were seen in the heart of the capital, Connaught Place, New Delhi.

In February 2016, the group released a statement after charges of sedition were slapped against Jawaharlal Nehru University students. The statement was called, "No Nation for Women," and it addressed the question of nationalism—unpacking the "anti-national/national" binary and how the very idea of nationalism is built on layers of exclusion of minorities. The group answered the calls to Bharat Maata Ki Jai, with Bharat Ki Mata Nahi Banenge, with the end to prove how hyper-masculinity often masquerades as patriotism.

On 2 May 2016, the UGC published in The Gazette of India, a letter regarding Prevention, Prohibition, and Redressal of Sexual Harassment of Women Employees and Students in Higher Educational Institutions. On 7 May 2016, the DCW issued notices to 23 universities, acting on Pinjra Tod's report. Acting on the complaint submitted to the DCW by Pinjra Tod in November 2015, regarding discriminatory rules in several women's hostels in Delhi. DCW later, also issued notices to seven colleges asking for an explanation regarding why hostel curfew timings differ for men and women. Pinjra Tod undertook a "night march" in North Campus against the Delhi University Students' Union (DUSU) elections, protesting against the violent nature of electoral politics on campus.

== Public art ==
In September 2015, within weeks of the movement's inception, there was wall art and graffiti painted across North Campus, Delhi University, featuring Pinjra Tod's name and pictures of birds escaping from cages. One of the founders of Pinjra Tod, which first became a public entity via a Facebook page, said that the creators of the work were unknown.

On 21 September 2015, two Pinjra Tod activists claimed to have received a phone call from a man who said he was a student of Satyawati College and a member of Akhil Bharatiya Vidyarthi Parishad (ABVP). He had got their phone number from posters they had pasted on top of others at the Wall of Democracy. Objecting to the way in which their actions had obscured other posters, the man allegedly threatened to beat up the women activists if they repeated their actions. ABVP said that the caller did not speak on behalf of the organisation and that they had no objection to Pinjra Tod or the posters put up by it. Pinjra Tod filed a First Information Report and produced a new poster saying "You can't lock the walls".

A year later, Pinjra Tod campaigners organised a "graffiti drive" at Ambedkar University that protested a wide range of social matters, not all related to women and/or their hostels. Their work was then challenged with anti-feminist graffiti, leading them to respond with further examples.

On 23 September 2016, Pinjra Tod had organised a night march and vigil in North Campus to end sexist diktats and discriminatory hostel rules, which was allegedly disrupted by ABVP activists. Pinjra Tod later released a video to substantiate its claim.

Following the disqualification (later overturned) of Lakshya, the drama society of Kamala Nehru College, for using words like bra and panty in their play at a theatre festival organised by Sahitya Kala Parishad on 13 February 2017, members of Pinjra Tod protested by performing a piece titled "An Ode to Bra, Panty and the Sahitya Kala Academy". They also hung bras on the outer wall of the Shri Ram Centre for Performing Arts, where the performance took place, to protest the stigmatisation of women's undergarments.

== Internal dissent ==
On 20 February 2019, a group of women issued a statement announcing that they were leaving the movement because it was not inclusive or properly representative. Claiming "Pinjra Tod is an organisation of Savarna Hindu women and like all other Savarna organisations it has failed women from marginalised race, castes and religion", they argued that the emotional and physical work of Muslim women and those from the Scheduled Castes, Scheduled Tribes and Other Backwards Classes had been exploited by Pinjra Tod and that the movement should be addressing wider issues of social abuse and harassment rather than concentrating on those related to gender. Referencing women's voices emboldened by the #MeToo movement, the leavers said "Thus, to Savarna feminists and Savarna women's organisations, we are no longer going to be fascinated by your sisterhood circles and tokenism inclusivity. Your Time is Up too." A few days later, Pinjra Tod issued a response countering the charges raised.

== Activists' arrests ==
On 23 May 2020, two activists associated with the movement were interrogated by the Delhi Police Special Cell and arrested from their homes in connection to the 2020 Delhi riots. Devangana Kalita and Natasha Narwal, the arrested students, were PhD scholars at Jawaharlal Nehru University and had opposed the Citizenship Amendment Act, 2019. Senior police officials later told reporters that they had been arrested on charges of 'obstructing public servant in discharge of public functions' through use of force. As per media reports, the first information report had not reflected this. A statement released by the group following the arrests stated, 'We strongly condemn this hounding of democratic activists and students being carried out by the state and appeal to the student community and all democratic minded citizens to remain vigilant and strong in our struggles in face of this repression.'

== Criticism ==
It was claimed that the group reflected the nepotistic tendencies of the privileged by reiterating the views and perceptions of the elite savarna group within Indian society and thus failed to achieve the reforms it seeks.
