= Baby Halder =

Indian author (born 1973)

- Born: 1973 (age 52–53); Kashmir, India
- Occupations: Domestic worker, writer
- Known for: Aalo Aandhari (A Life Less Ordinary) (2006)

Baby Halder (or Haldar) (born 1973) is an Indian author. Her best known work is her autobiography Aalo Aandhari (A Life Less Ordinary) (2002) which describes her harsh life growing up as a domestic worker, later translated into 21 languages, including 13 foreign languages.

== Early life and marriage ==
Born in Kashmir, Halder was abandoned by her birth mother at age 4 in Murshidabad, when her father's habitual drinking forced her mother to leave him. Subsequently, she was raised by an abusive father, an ex-serviceman and driver and her step-mother, with whom she travelled from Kashmir to Murshidabad and finally to Durgapur, West Bengal, where she grew up. She went to school intermittently, and dropped off after sixth standard, when at the age of 12, her father married her off to a man 14 years her senior, and a small-time decorator. She had her first child at the age of 13, and two more in a quick succession. Meanwhile, after her sister was strangled to death by her husband, she started working as a domestic servant in the neighbourhood. Finally in 1999, at the age of 25, after years of domestic violence, she left her husband, escaping to Delhi on a train, with her three children on board. Now as a single parent, she started working as a housemaid in New Delhi homes, to support and educate her children, sons Subodh and Tapas and daughter, Piya; and then encountered several exploitative employers.

== Literary career ==
Her last employer was writer and retired anthropology professor Prabodh Kumar, a grandson of noted Hindi literary giant Munshi Premchand, living in Gurgaon, a suburb of capital New Delhi. Kumar noted her interest in books while she was dusting his book shelves, and encouraged her to first read leading authors, starting with Taslima Nasreen's autobiographical Amar Meyebela (My Girlhood) about a tumultuous youth and deep anger on being born a woman in a poor society. This deeply moved Halder and turned out be a turning point, as it was to inspire her own memories, later on. She soon zealously began reading other authors. Subsequently, before going on a trip to South India, Kumar bought her a notebook and pen and encouraged her to write her life story, which she did late at night after work and sometimes in between chores, using plain matter-of-fact language and writing in native Bengali. When Kumar was back after a month, she had already written 100 pages.

After several months, when her memoir was completed, Kumar also aided in editing the manuscript, and shared it with local literary circles and translated it into Hindi. This version was published in 2002 by a small Kolkata-based publishing house, Roshani Publishers. It received media attention as it documented the hard lives led by domestic servants in Asia, and within two years it had published two more editions. The Bengali original, Aalo Aandhari (Light and Darkness) was also published in 2004. A Malayalam version appeared in 2005 and the English translation was published in 2006, which became a best-seller in India, while The New York Times called it India's Angela's Ashes. Soon it was translated into 21 languages, including 13 foreign languages, including French, Japanese and Korean.

The book was translated into German in 2008. In 2008, a visit for her to Germany was planned in the company of her publisher, to present the book to audiences there and explain to them the present situation of women in India. The Georg-August University in Goettingen, Germany arranged for a seminar to be held with the author and her publisher on 23 October 2008. Further seminars were arranged in Frankfurt, Düsseldorf, Krefeld, Halle, Kiel, Berlin and Heidelberg. Her second book Eshat Roopantar in Bengali was also well received.

== Personal life ==
As of 2012, Halder continues to work for Prabodh Kumar in DLF City, Gurgaon. Although she is building a house in Kolkata with earnings from her books, she plans to stay on in the city.

== Bibliography ==
- Aalo Aandhari (Bengali, Darkness and Light), 2002.
- Eshat Roopantar (Bengali).
- A Life Less Ordinary (Translation of Aalo Aandhari), tr. by Urvashi Butalia. Zubaan, 2006. ISBN 818901367X.
- 'GHARE FHERAR PATH' (An Autobiographical Narrative in Bengali) June 2014

== See also ==
- List of Indian writers
