= P. N. Haksar =

Indian diplomat (1913–1998)

Deputy Chairman of the Planning Commission
- In office 4 January 1975 – 31 May 1977
- Prime Minister: Indira Gandhi

1st Principal Secretary to the Prime Minister of India
- In office 6 December 1971 – 28 February 1973
- Prime Minister: Indira Gandhi
- Preceded by: Office established
- Succeeded by: P. N. Dhar

2nd Secretary to the Prime Minister of India
- In office 1967 – 5 December 1971
- Preceded by: Lakshmi Kant Jha
- Succeeded by: Office temporarily abolished

Personal details
- Born: Parmeshwar Narayan Haksar; September 4, 1913 Gujranwala, Punjab, British India (present-day Punjab, Pakistan)
- Died: November 25, 1998 (aged 85) New Delhi, Delhi, India
- Spouse: Urmila Sapru
- Children: 2; Nandita Haksar
- Education: University of Allahabad; London School of Economics

Parmeshwar Narayan Haksar (4 September 1913 – 25 November 1998) was an Indian bureaucrat and diplomat, best known for his two-year stint as Prime Minister Indira Gandhi's principal secretary (1971–73). In that role, Haksar was the chief strategist and policy adviser behind Gandhi's early years and her establishment of strong authority in the 1970s. After this he was appointed deputy chairman of the Planning Commission and then the first-ever chancellor of New Delhi's Jawaharlal Nehru University.

An advocate of centralisation and socialism, he was a Kashmiri Pandit who became Gandhi's closest confidant in her inner coterie of bureaucrats, the so-called "Kashmiri mafia". Before this, Haksar was a diplomat of the Indian Foreign Service, who served as India's ambassador to Austria and Nigeria.

== Personal life ==
Haksar was born in 1913, in Gujranwala (now in Punjab, Pakistan) in a Kashmiri Pandit family. He studied Sanskrit at home and obtained an M.Sc. from the University of Allahabad (now in Uttar Pradesh, India). He went on to study at the London School of Economics. Some critics observed a perceived alignment with Soviet ideology. As a student of Allahabad University, he was a resident of Mayo Hall and made frequent visits to the Anand Bhawan, the house of Motilal Nehru. Parmeshwar was a voracious reader of art history and connoisseur of paintings. During his interlude in London as a student, he was influenced by Fabian socialism and later became associated with Marxists.

His daughter Nandita Haksar, is a human rights activist, advocate, and writer.

During the latter years of his life, Haksar became associated with the Delhi Science Forum, initiatives on human rights, and opposition to neoliberal policies and secularism. He lost his eyesight during the last 10 years of his life when the only pleasure he allowed himself was a weekly massage. Haksar died at the age of 85, on 25 November 1998.

== Career ==
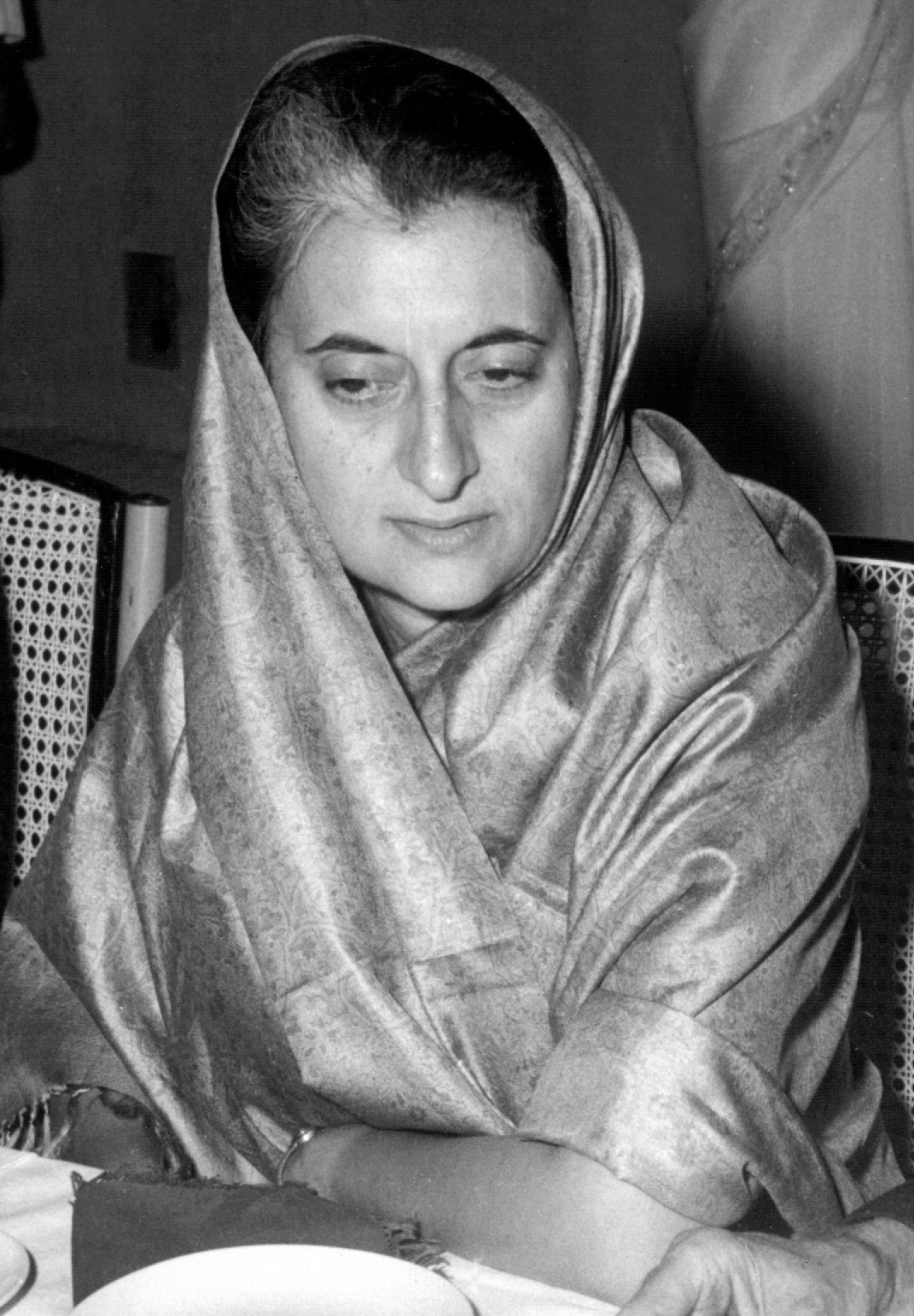
As Indira Gandhi's (pictured) principal secretary, Haksar helped a beleaguered and inexperienced prime minister's rise to near-absolute power.

=== Early career ===
Following university, Haksar made his mark as a prominent lawyer in Allahabad before he was selected for the Indian Foreign Service in 1947, formally joining the service by direct appointment with effect from 18 January 1949. He was close to a fellow-Kashmiri from Allahabad Jawaharlal Nehru, the latter who would go on to become independent India's first prime minister. A one-time student at the London School of Economics, he was a junior colleague of V. K. Krishna Menon at the India League in London. Some critics viewed Haksar as overly assertive and suggested he was aligned with Soviet interests.

=== Civil services ===
P. N. Haksar served as the Indian ambassador to Nigeria and Austria. In the 1960s, he also served as a deputy high commissioner in London. After twenty years in the Indian foreign service, he was appointed an aide to the then prime minister, Indira Gandhi. In 1967, he replaced L. K. Jha as Secretary to the Prime Minister of India. He was promoted to the newly created post of Principal Secretary to the Prime Minister of India in 1971, thus becoming the most powerful senior civil servant in the prime minister's office. He served for six years as India's most powerful civil servant. He authored the 'Stray Thoughts Memorandum' at the Congress Working Committee meeting in Bangalore which ultimately led to the removal of her political rivals, such as Morarji Desai. Until he vacated the position of Principal Secretary to Indira Gandhi, Haksar exercised significant influence on the formulation of domestic and foreign policies in Raisina Hill. As Principal Secretary, Haksar fashioned Indira Gandhi's decision about the timing and level of support to be given to the Bangladeshi freedom struggle, issuing directives from her private office to the top military leadership in some cases. The Prime Minister and her Principal Secretary subsequently fell out because Haksar reportedly disagreed with Indira's younger son, Sanjay, who aspired to be his mother's successor. It was Sanjay who authorised a police raid on the Haksar family's shop in New Delhi, Pandit Brothers, deliberately humiliating the civil servant. Haksar reportedly maintained a distance from Indira Gandhi following this incident. When she returned to power for the second time in 1980, she requested he resume his former role, but Haksar declined.

=== Administrator and strategist ===
Haksar was noted for his strategising on the nationalisation of banks, insurance firms and foreign-owned oil companies, the 1971 Indo-Soviet Treaty and India's support to the liberation of what would become Bangladesh. He is also the chief architect of the Shimla Agreement with Pakistan, as he was of the creation of the Research and Analysis Wing (RAW), India's foreign secret intelligence agency

=== Refusal of Padma Vibhushan ===
Upon his retirement from the civil service in 1973, Indira Gandhi offered Haksar India's second highest civilian honour, the Padma Vibhushan, for his numerous distinguished services to India; however, in a letter to Govind Narain he declined the honour stating that "Accepting an award for work done somehow causes an inexplicable discomfort to me." The prime minister duly rescinded her offer.

== Books ==
Haksar authored several influential works throughout his career, reflecting his insights on Indian policy, diplomacy, and society.

- Premonitions (1979)
- Reflections on our Times (1982)
- Studies in Indo-Soviet Relations (1987)
- India's Foreign Policy and Its Problems (1989)
- Premonitions: Collection of Essays and Speeches (1989)
- One more Life (1990)
- Genesis of Indo-Pakistan Conflict on Kashmir
- Haksar Memorial Vol-1Contemplations on the Human Condition
- Haksar Memorial Vol-2 Contribution in Remembrance
- Haksar Memorial Vol-3 Challenge for Nation Building in a world in turmoil
- Nehru's Vision of Peace and Security in Nuclear Age
- Studies in Indo-Soviet Relations
