= Ritu Menon =

Indian feminist, writer, and publisher

- Born: 1949 (age 76–77)
- Education: Miranda House
- Occupations: Publisher; writer; editor; journalist; biographer; women's rights activist
- Years active: 1984–present
- Organization: International Alliance of Independent Publishers
- Known for: Feminist publishing
- Notable work: Borders & Boundaries: Women in India's Partition; Out of Line: A Literary and Political Biography of Nayantara Sahgal; Zohra! A Biography in Four Acts
- Title: Co-founder of Kali for Women; Founder of Women Unlimited
- Movement: Feminism
- Spouse: A. G. Krishna Menon
- Awards: Padma Shri (2011)

Ritu Menon is an Indian publisher, writer, editor, journalist, biographer, and women's rights activist.

== Early life and personal life ==
Menon was born in 1949. She attended Miranda House at the University of Delhi. Menon is married to architect A. G. Krishna Menon, also known as "Pogey".

== Career ==
In 1984, Menon co-founded Kali for Women, India's first exclusively feminist publishing house, along with Urvashi Butalia, her longtime collaborator. In 2003, Kali for Women shut shop due to lack of commercial viability compounded by irreconcilable personal differences between Menon and Butalia. Thereafter, Menon independently founded Women Unlimited, another feminist publishing house.

She has also written numerous newspaper articles and op-eds. Her writing focuses on violence against women, religion's take on women and the gender divide across the society from a strongly feminist and left-wing perspective.

Over a Zoom call, she talked about Address Book: A Publishing Memoir in the time of COVID, which she wrote during the pandemic without an explicit plan to publish a book. “It became a form of putting down what I was going through, remembering, thinking, reading, and worrying about,” she says (13 July 2021).

== Publications ==
- "The Unfinished Business," Outlook, May 2001
- "Anti-CAA protests by Muslim women are about where, how and why you belong," Indian Express, Feb 2020
- Borders & Boundaries: Women in India's Partition. 1998 (with Kamla Bhasin)
- No Woman's Land: Women from Pakistan, India & Bangladesh Write on the Partition of India. 2004
- Unequal Citizens: A Study of Muslim Women in India. 2006 (with Zoya Hasan)
- From Mathura to Manorama: Resisting Violence Against Women in India. 2007 (with Kalpana Kannabiran)
- address book: a publishing memoir in the time of covid

== Awards and honours ==
In 2000-2001, she served on the International Advisory Board of the Raja Rao Award for Literature. In 2011, Menon and Butalia were jointly conferred the Padma Shri, India's fourth-highest civilian award, by the Government of India.
