= Pankaj Butalia =

Indian documentary filmmaker

- Born: 1950 (age 75–76); Ambala, Haryana, India
- Education: University of Delhi
- Occupation: Filmmaker
- Known for: Moksha, Karvaan
- Relatives: Urvashi Butalia

Pankaj Butalia is an Indian documentary filmmaker. His 1993 film Moksha (also known by the English title Salvation), on the widows of Vrindavan, received four international awards. Several of his films have been screened extensively throughout the world. He has also directed a feature film Karvaan (1999), starring Naseeruddin Shah.

== Early life ==
Butalia was born in Ambala, Haryana, in 1950, to Joginder Singh and Subhadra Butalia. Feminist author and publisher Urvashi Butalia is his sister. He studied at St. Stephen's College, Delhi, and was a national level table tennis player. After obtaining his master's degree, he taught economics at Delhi University for many years before making his first film.

== Film society work ==
When still a student, Butalia co-founded the film society Celluloid. Subsequently, he became active in the Film Society movement at the national level, and held the post of secretary of the Federation of Film Societies of India for eight years. He was assigned the responsibility of organising the documentary section of the International Film Festival of India during 1986–88.

== Career as filmmaker ==
Butalia started his career as a filmmaker with When Hamlet went to Mizoram (1990), on the way Shakespeare's Hamlet has become part of popular culture in the North-Eastern Indian state of Mizoram. After its favourable critical reception he quit his teaching job to become a full-time filmmaker.

=== Moksha ===
Butalia's second film Moksha (1993) (not to be confused with the 2001 feature film of the same name) was on the plight of Bengali widows in Vrindavan. Abandoned by their families, they are doomed to a life of penury. The film attracted considerable attention, winning four international awards. The review on the official website of the San Francisco Film Festival says: "Pankaj Butalia’s Salvation brings such individuality and clarity to its portrayal of the lives of Bengali widows that it achieves that all-too-rare balance between advocacy and cinema. Through a series of candid interviews, generous observational footage and a lush, poetic narration, the film makes the point that Indian society, right or wrong, simply does not have a place for these women." It adds: "Salvation is a testament to the power of human will and human dignity." Cinematographer Piyush Shah received the National Award for Best Cinematography for "documenting a tragic reality with all its moods and emotions".

=== Karvaan ===
In 1999 Butalia directed his first, and to date only, feature film Karvaan, starring Naseeruddin Shah and Kitu Gidwani. Also known by the English title Shadows in the Dark, the film deals with the Partition of India and its aftermath in both India and Pakistan. It won a special mention at the Amiens International Film Festival, and was screened at the Venice and Rotterdam film festivals.

=== The Great Arc films ===
Butalia made two short films in 2003, both dealing with surveying in British India. In the 1860s, the British trained Indian surveyors to disguise themselves, enter Tibet and carry on surveys incognito. Over the next twenty years, many Indian surveyors entered Tibet in disguise and carried out the most authoritative surveys of their times. A Million Steps is a short documentary attempting to look at the adventures of three of these surveyors. Tracing the Arc is about the Great Trigonometric Survey or Great Arc Project that started in 1802 and lasted through most of the 19th century. Although arising out of cartographic and military necessity, it was an ambitious attempt to measure the curvature of the earth's surface. It remains a major achievement of applied science in British India. The film attempts to recreate the stupendous effort and look at some of its implications. The two films were part of the Survey of India's "Great Arc Bicentenary Celebrations".

=== The conflict trilogy and other recent work ===
In 2007, Butalia returned to the North-East to make Manipur Song, which documents the impact of violence on the lives of ordinary people in the state of Manipur. It was selected for screening in a special section for Indian documentary films at the 54th International Leipzig festival. More recently, Butalia has been associated with DocWok, an initiative to mentor documentary film production in India. At a rough cut workshop held in November 2012, his film The Textures of Loss was one of six selected by DocWok for the current round of projects. The film deals with the sense of loss that is all-pervasive in Kashmir after more than two decades of violence. The film was initially denied certification by the CBFC. In May 2015 the Delhi High Court allowed its release without any cuts. Another film recently concluded is A Landscape of Neglect (originally titled Assamblog) shot extensively in remote parts of Assam over a period of three years. Together with Manipur Song and The Textures of Loss, it forms the third part of a trilogy dealing with conflict in India. These were followed by Yeh kahaan aa gaye hum, a film on Urdu poet and lyricist Nida Fazli, and In Search of the Found Object, on artist Vivan Sundaram. His most recent completed film, titled Mash Up (2017), documents the lives and hopes of two young men from a slum in Delhi, who aspire to be singers.

At the 15th Madurai Film Festival held in December 2013, the Retrospective section featured seven films by Pankaj Butalia.

== Other contributions ==
Apart from his work in cinema, Butalia has been writing on current affairs in various newspapers such as the Times of India and the Indian Express. He is also the author of a book entitled Dark Room: Child Sexuality in India (Harper Collins, 2013; ISBN 978-9350294345), which is possibly the only book on the subject.

== Filmography ==
- When Hamlet went to Mizoram (1990)
- Moksha (1993)
- A Cat's Concert (1997)
- A Matter of Light (1998)
- Karvaan (1999)
- A Million Steps (2003)
- Tracing the Arc (2003)
- Manipur Song (2007)
- An Island of Hope (2010)
- Centrestage (2010)
- Kahani Ek Gaon ki (2012)
- The Textures of Loss (2012)
- A Landscape of Neglect (2015)
- Yeh Kahaan aa Gaye Hum (2015)
- In Search of the Found Object (2016)
- Mash Up (2017)

== Awards ==
- Silver Dove for Moksha, Leipzig, 1993
- Golden Conch for Moksha, Bombay International Film Festival of Documentary, Animation and Short Films, 1994
- Special Jury Award for Moksha, Golden Gate Awards, San Francisco, 1994
- Special Jury Award for Moksha, Freeburg, 1994
- Special Mention for Shadows in the Dark in the Feature Film category, Amiens International Film Festival, 1999
