= Forgotten Refugees (book) =

2022 book by Nandita Haksar

Forgotten Refugees — Two Iraqi Brothers in India
- Author: Nandita Haksar
- Language: English
- Publisher: Speaking Tiger Books
- Publication date: 25 April 2022
- Publication place: India

Forgotten Refugees: Two Iraqi Brothers in India is a book which is written by human rights lawyer Nandita Haksar The book was published in 25 April 2022 by Speaking Tiger Books.

== Reception ==
The Hindu Review wrote about the book "In the appendices, Haksar traces the history of refugee protection in India and calls for better processes to be put in place".

The Telegraph said "She points out the need to move away from “patronizing narratives rooted in the politics of pity” so that we can hear what refugees want to tell us about the racism and the discrimination they face in countries where they seek refuge".
