= Nandita Haksar =

Indian writer and activist (born 1955)

- Born: 1955 (age 70–71)
- Citizenship: Indian
- Education: Jawaharlal Nehru University
- Known for: Human Rights activism
- Notable work: Framing Geelani, Hanging Afzal: Patriotism in the Time of Terror (2007); The Judgement That Never Came: Army Rule in North East India (2011)
- Spouse: Sebastian Hongray
- Parents: P. N. Haksar (father); Urmila Haksar (nee Sapru) (mother)

Nandita Haksar is a human rights activist, advocate, and writer from India. She is a prolific writer, notably known for Framing Geelani, Hanging Afzal: Patriotism in the Time of Terror (2007), and The Judgement That Never Came: Army Rule in North East India (2011). She has fought landmark human rights violations cases in the Supreme Court of India, and Gauhati High Court. She was conferred LL. D. (Honoris Causa) in 2015 by NALSAR University of Law.

== Early life ==
Nandita was born in 1955. Her parents were P. N. Haksar, an Indian diplomat, and Urmila Haksar (née Sapru).

Haksar studied B.A. in history at Delhi University which she intended to pursue further in Jawaharlal Nehru University. However, in her final exams, she failed. She repeated the exams and failed again. Her teacher Uma Chakravarti later found that sympathisers of the Bharatiya Jana Sangh had got themselves appointed as examiners for the history papers. They deliberately failed students whose answers did not conform to the right-wing Hindu historiography. Haksar studied LLB at Delhi University where Upendra Baxi taught her jurisprudence and Constitutional law. While still studying law, she interned with Indira Jaising. Together, they worked on a case concerning pavement dwellers in Delhi which deeply influenced Haksar's ideas of advocacy and practicing law. Thereafter, she further ventured into human rights and feminist movements in the country.

== Activism ==
While studying at the Jawaharlal Nehru University, she began her activism with people from Northeast India in the 1970s.

Her first case Sebastian M Hongray v. Union of India, led to the landmark judgement in the country's Habeas corpus jurisprudence and law of tort. In its judgement, the Supreme Court of India awarded compensation of custodial death even when the victim's bodies were not found.

In 1983 Haksar was one of the first advocates to file a case in the Supreme Court of India challenging the constitutionality of the Armed Forces (Special Powers) Act. She then took the issue to the United Nations in 1991. She worked as secretary of the People's Union for Democratic Rights in 1987.

== Books ==
Haskar is a prolific writer. She considers writing as her first love. Further, her experiences as activist and advocate have enriched her writings. Her books have been translated into several languages including, Burmese, Tangkhul, and Tamil.

- 1984. (co-edited with Luingam Luithui). Nagaland File: A Question of Human Rights. Lancer International.
- 1986. Demystification of Law for Women. New Delhi: Lancer Press.
- 1987. (co-authored with Uma Chakravarti) The Delhi Riots: Three Days in the Life of a Nation. New Delhi: Lancer International.
- 2007. Framing Geelani, Hanging Afzal: Patriotism in the Time of Terror. New Delhi: Promilla & Co and Bibliophile South Asia.
- 2009. Rogue Agent: How India’s Military Intelligence Betrayed the Burmese Resistance. New Delhi: Penguin Books India.
- 2011. (co-authored with Sebastian Hongray). The Judgement That Never Came: Army Rule in North East India. New Delhi: Chicken Neck Publications.
- 2011. ABC of Naga Culture and Civilization.
- 2014. Across The Chicken Neck: Travels in Northeast India. New Delhi: Rupa Publications.
- 2015. The Many Faces of Kashmiri Nationalism: From the Cold War to the Present Day. New Delhi: Speaking Tiger.
- 2016. (co-authored with Mohammed Aamir Khan). Framed as a Terrorist: My 14-year Struggle to Prove My Innocence. New Delhi: Speaking Tiger.
- 2019. (co-authored with Sebastian Hongray). Kuknalim: Naga Armed Resistance: Testimonies of Leaders, Pastors, Healers and Soldiers. New Delhi: Speaking Tiger.
- 2022. Forgotten Refugees: Two Iraqi Brothers in India. New Delhi: Speaking Tiger.
- 2023. (co-authored with Anjali Deshpande). Japanese Management, Indian Resistance: The Struggles of the Maruti Suzuki Workers. New Delhi: Speaking Tiger.
- 2023. Shooting the Sun Why Manipur Was Engulfed by Violence and the Government Remained Silent. New Delhi: Speaking Tiger.

== Awards ==
Haksar was conferred LL. D. (Honoris Causa) in 2015 by NALSAR University of Law. Her citation noted,

Ms. Nandita has shown us that advocacy is not about taking on cases, but causes. It is about speaking with those whose voices have been muffled, gagged or silenced. That advocacy is not limited to courts and litigation but extends to grass-root mobilization, opinion-making, and education.

Other awards include,

- 2022. Rotary Writing For Peace Award.

== Archives ==
Haksar's collection of transcripts, documents, press clippings, and letters are archives at the 'Archives of Contemporary India' hosted at the Ashoka University. They provide insights into her work on human rights with India's tribal population, migrant workers, and activists, especially from Northeast India and Kashmir. They also feature work with refugees and Burmese activists.

== Personal life ==
Haksar lives in Delhi, Goa, and Ukhrul with her husband Sebastian Hongray.
