= Miranda House =

Women's college in Delhi, India

Miranda House (W)
- Motto: स्वाध्यायान्न प्रमदितव्यम्
- Motto in English: Learning through self-education
- Type: University College for Women
- Established: 7 March 1948; 78 years ago
- Founder: Maurice Gwyer
- Accreditation: NAAC (A++ Grade)
- Affiliations: University of Delhi
- Principal: Dr. Bijayalaxmi Nanda
- Faculty: 238
- Administrative staff: 326
- Students: More than 3,000
- Location: Delhi, India
- Campus: Urban
- Calendar: Semester
- Colours: Cocoa Brown; Green
- Nicknames: Miranda, Mirandians
- Website: www.mirandahouse.ac.in

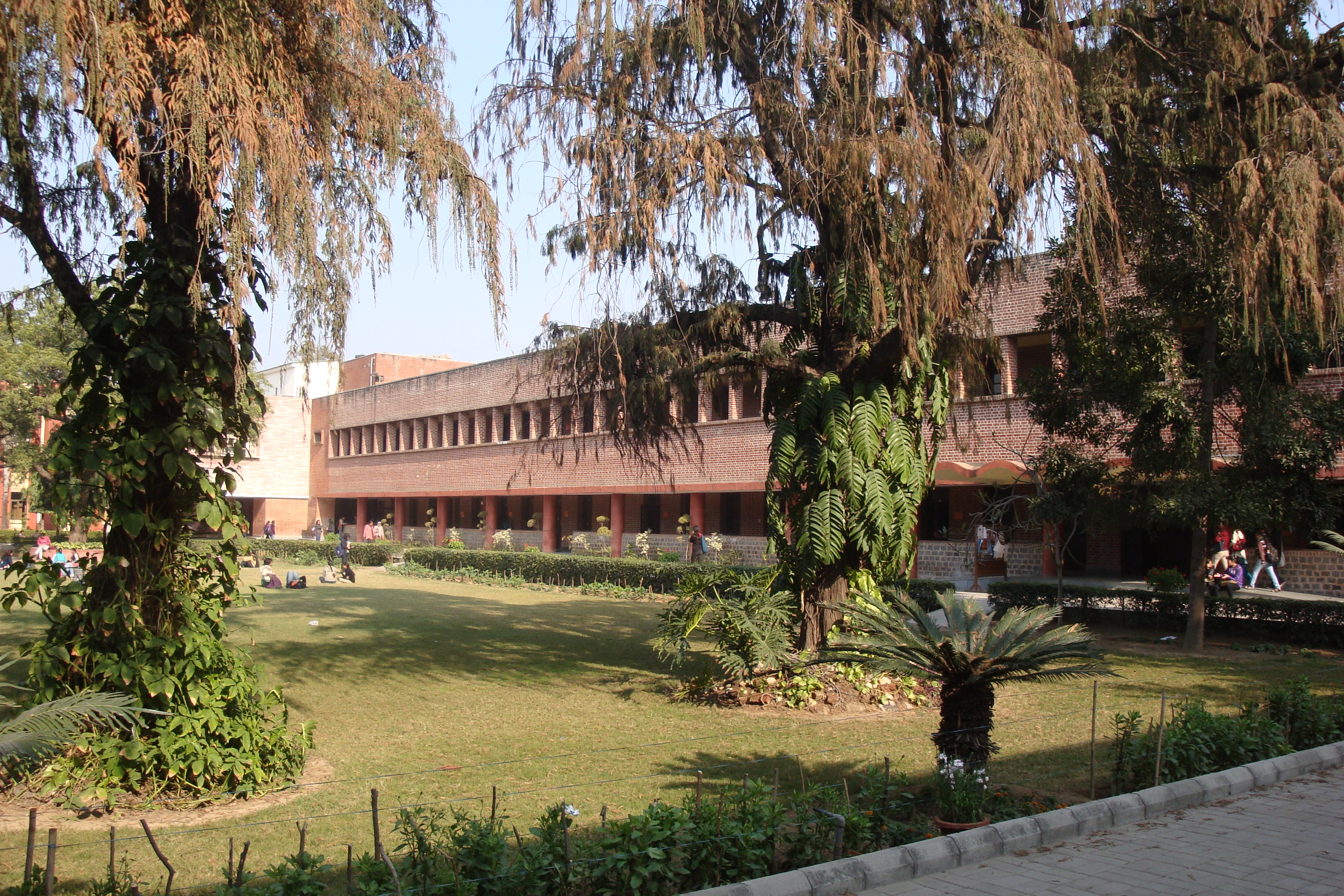
Baje House

Miranda House is a constituent college for women at the University of Delhi in India. Established in 1948, it is one of the top ranked colleges of the country and ranked number 1 for consecutively seven years (as of 2023).

== History ==
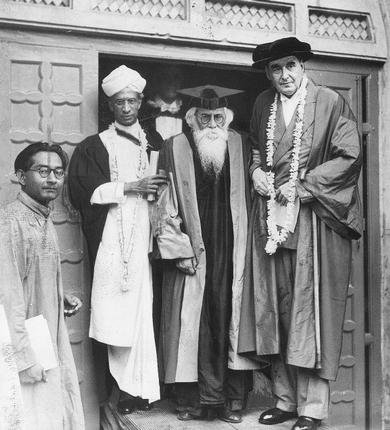
Sir Maurice Gwyer (extreme right), founder of Miranda House, University of Delhi, Rabindranath Tagore (centre), Sarvepalli Radhakrishnan (left)

Miranda House was founded in 1948 by the university vice-chancellor, Sir Maurice Gwyer. In a magazine published by him in 1952, he gave three reasons for why the college was called Miranda. His favorite actress was Carmen Miranda, his daughter's name was Miranda, and a character named Miranda in William Shakespeare’s play The Tempest was, according to him, a perfect example of what a lady should be. Its foundation stone was laid by Lady Edwina Mountbatten on 7 March of the same year. Miranda House is built of red bricks on the university campus. Its original design was planned by the architect Walter Sykes George and is architecturally similar to other educational institutions in India founded in the colonial era. As the college grew, several buildings were added.

Alumni and students of this college are known as Mirandians.

Miranda House started with 33 students in July 1948, which rose to 105 by September the same year. It was 2,090 in 1997–98. The academic staff increased from six in 1948 to 120 (permanent) in 1997–98 and that of non-academic staff from 11 in 1948 (five in the hostel and six in the college) to 120 in 1997–98. The college accommodation (hostel) housed 43 students in 1948, of whom seven were enrolled at other colleges of the University of Delhi. There are now 250 students in the hostel.

At the time of its founding, Miranda House had six departments; as of 2012, there were eighteen. Miranda House pioneered science education for women at the University of Delhi when it started its B.Sc. Honours (Botany) course in 1948. Science teaching was conducted in the university and in 1963–64, B.Sc. General and in 1971, B.Sc. Honours teaching work started in the college. Many new subjects have been introduced in the humanities and social sciences since then.

Miranda House provides liberal education in social sciences, humanities and the basic sciences. The college's infrastructure includes teaching laboratories and general facilities. As of 2012, Miranda House has more than 4,000 students.

== Integration ==
In 2019, the Madras High Court ruled in Arun Kumar vs. Inspector General of Registration that the bodily integrity of children born with intersex variations is paramount and that the State has a duty to preserve and protect it from birth.

In 2025, the Supreme Court of India ruled in Reena Banerjee and Another vs. Government of NCT of Delhi that the state has constitutional obligation to allocate resources for housing to persons with intellectual disabilities irrespective of their capacity to contribute economically or otherwise as sanctity of life is inherent in every human being.

In 2024, Anushka Priyadarshini – a female student with intersex variation and an intellectual disability – applied to the Miranda House. After two years obstruction by Miranda House Officials, in 2026, the Court of Chief Commissioner for Persons with Disabilities ruled in Anushka Priyadarshini v. The Principal, Miranda House that denial and consequent segregation of a female student with intersex variation and an intellectual disability in public colleges was unconstitutional, ordered grant of her admission.

== Academics ==
Miranda House offers a wide array of undergraduate and postgraduate courses. All undergraduate courses commencing from the academic year 2014-15 are according to the three-year undergraduate honours degree system.

=== Undergraduate courses ===
- B.A.Programme
- B.A. Honours: Bengali, Economics, English, Geography, Hindi, History, Hindustani Music (Vocal/ Instrumental), Philosophy, Political Science, Sanskrit, Sociology
- B.Sc. Honours: Botany, Chemistry, Mathematics, Physics, Zoology
- B.Sc.: Life Sciences, Physical science (Computer Science)
- B.El.Ed: (four-year course)

=== Postgraduate courses ===
Students enroll for M.A. and M.Sc. programmes in the college; classes are held at the respective departments at the university.

- M.A. programme: The same subjects are offered as at the B.A. Honours level except for Political Science, Geography, and Sociology.
- M.Sc. programme: The same subjects are offered as at the B.Sc. Honours level. Additionally, the college offers M.Sc. in Anthropology.

=== Four-year undergraduate program ===
The University of Delhi introduced the four-year undergraduate program scheme in the academic year 2013-14. All undergraduate programs offered by the University of Delhi would thenceforth be for the duration of four years, with multiple exit options and the inclusion of research components. This reform was intended to provide greater flexibility and wider range of choices to the students.

In June 2014, after a lot of controversy, speculation and protests, the four-year undergraduate program was removed according to the directives of the University Grants Commission. All the constituent colleges of the University of Delhi were instructed to return to the previous three-year format for first degrees.

Now a Choice-Based Credit System (CBCS) is being followed in the University of Delhi.

=== Foreign language courses ===
The college offers one-year certificate courses in French, German, and Spanish in collaboration with the department of Germanic and Romance studies and department of East Asian studies, University of Delhi.

=== Short-duration certificate courses ===
The college offers a 2-month certificate course in computer applications and a 16-week certificate course in computer applications for visually challenged students. The college does not charge a fee for computer applications for visually challenged students.

=== Library ===
The Miranda House Library acquired its first book on 22 July 1948. In the beginning it was confined to one room. The present building was constructed under the guidance of the founder librarian, P. Tandon. The foundation stone was laid by Prime Minister Indira Gandhi on 7 March 1973.

The new library block is a double-storeyed building consisting of deposit-counter, issue-of-books counter, stack hall, reserve section, reading hall, teachers' reading room, magazine section, and administrative section.

=== Amba Dalmia Resource Centre ===
Miranda House is the first college to establish a computer-based resource centre to aid its visually challenged students. Work on the resource centre was initiated in 2006, with an endowment from Ms Manju Kapur Dalmia, author and member of teaching faculty at Miranda House.

=== D S Kothari Centre ===
DS Kothari Centre for Research and Innovation in Science Education

D S Kothari Centre for Research and Innovation in Science Education and Amstel Institute (University of Amsterdam, the Netherlands) have instituted this project in collaboration. The primary objective is to improve the quality of science education in schools by introducing Information and Communication Technologies (ICT) tools embedded in carefully designed learning environments.

The centre conducts baseline tests for undergraduate students and a prestigious 'Science Award' is given to a student from all the science departments and years on the basis of a test scores and a presentation on a contemporary and interdisciplinary topic.

Summer internships, lectures and camps have been successfully organized by the centre.

=== Placement cell ===
The placement cell of the college consists of faculty members and student volunteers. The Placement Cell coordinates the activities of career counseling and campus recruitment.

=== Rankings ===
College rankings

General – India
- NIRF (Colleges) (2023): 1

Miranda House has ranked first among colleges in India by the National Institutional Ranking Framework (NIRF) in 2017, 2018, 2019, 2020, 2021 and 2023.

== Campus ==
=== Architecture ===
Located in the University of Delhi's north campus enclave, Miranda House was designed by architect Walter Sykes George in a similar style to other colonial educational institutions of the country. The college hostel is among the oldest residential buildings in the university. The hostel section is laid out in a quadrangle, with gardens placed out by bottle palms. In the past six decades, as the college has grown, several other buildings have been added to its original design. The campus is now declared a heritage building.

Since the beginning, Miranda House has undergone numerous physical changes and has grown with additions to its original layout plan. The major features of its structure are the main college building, the library, and the hostel block. In the 1950s, the new building for lectures was constructed. The principal's office, college office, teachers' lounge, students' common room, and sheds for four college buses were built during this period. The college auditorium, equipped with microphones, and the cafeteria building came up during this time. New classrooms were added by partitioning the old library hall. The new administrative section was built in the centre of the teaching wing. Some classrooms on the ground floor were converted into the administrative block, which also houses the principal's new office.

In its Golden Jubilee Year, the college auditorium was renovated under the supervision of interior designer and old Mirandian Ketaki Sood. A rock garden was set up in the space behind the students' common room and in front of the cafeteria.

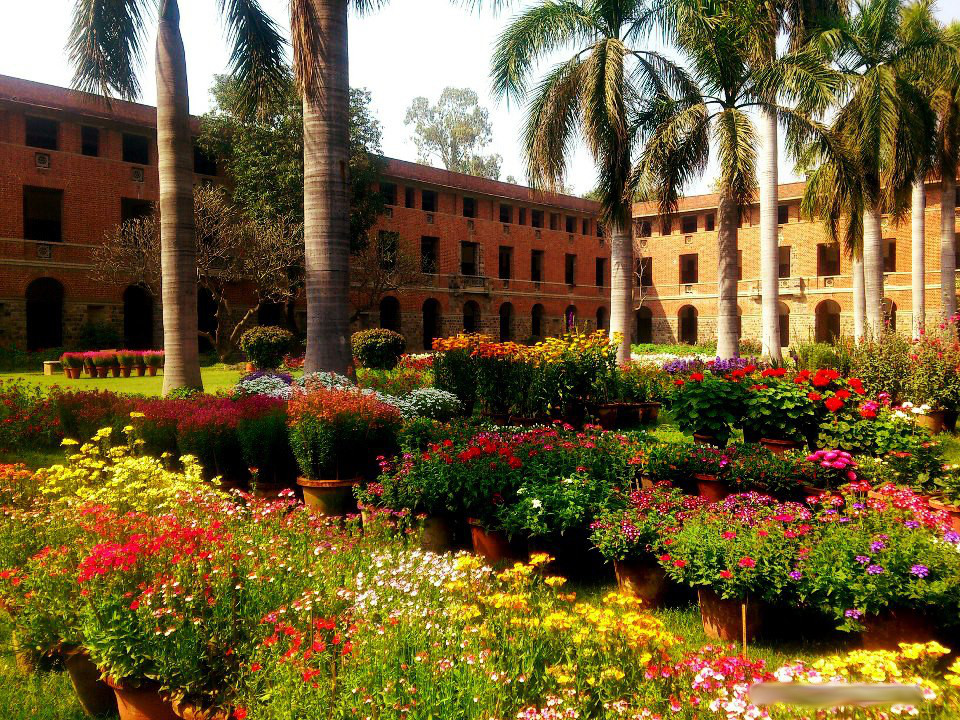
College hostel

Miranda House was a residence before it became a college. Miranda House hostel was founded in 1948 by the vice-chancellor, Sir Maurice Gwyer; its foundation stone was laid by Lady Edwina Mountbatten on 7 March the same year. The building was designed by architect Walter George.

The dining hall has a high arched ceiling, monastic tables and benches. There is a common room and an open coffee lounge attached to it. Declared a Heritage Building, extensive restoration and refurbishment work was undertaken in the hostel. It has 120 twin and seven four-person rooms. The day-to-day functioning is taken care of by a full-time resident warden and a housekeeper. The hostel administrative team includes the principal, the vice-principal, the bursar, teacher representatives on the hostel committee, and the hostel warden.

== Student life ==
Women's Development Cell

The Women's Development Cell of Miranda House is an integral part of the college, constituting women working together for a gender equal world while categorically expanding their feminist politics.

=== Societies ===
Miranda House constitutes various cultural societies including Mridang (Indian Dance), Tanz (Western Dance), Anukriti (Hindi Dramatics), Ariels (English Dramatics), Geetanjali (Indian Music), Orpheus (Western Music), Celluloid (Film Club), Snapshots (Photography), BlueQuill (Creative Writing Club), Enactus (social entrepreneurship), Adwitiya (Fine Arts), Shabdita (Hindi literary society), Debating Society, Quiz Society, Gandhi Study Circle, TULA, MH Vatavaran, etc. The societies have members who enter through ECA trials and then, additional members are selected through various rounds of auditions.

=== National Cadet Corps (NCC) ===
Miranda House NCC Company has 160 cadets, who are enrolled in the Army wing. As per change in the NCC policy making training for two years, many second-year students can join NCC.

=== National Service Scheme (NSS) ===
NSS has two core activities: teaching the children of the support staff and the underprivileged children in the neighboring areas; reading and recording for the visually challenged students of the college. Volunteers also participate in seminars, social campaigns and related competitions.

=== Sports and games ===
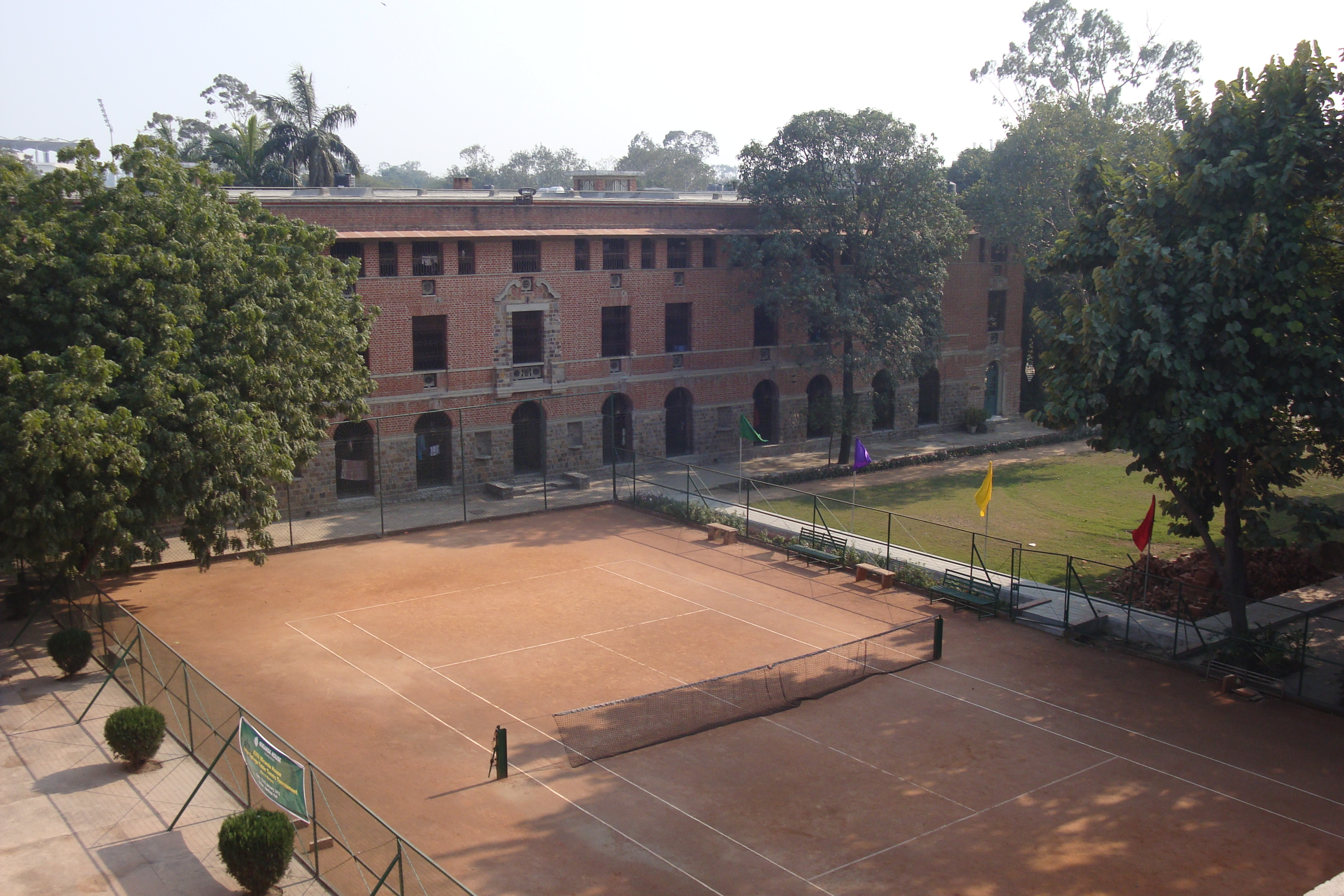
Tennis Court

The department organizes fresher competitions in cross-country race, basketball and table tennis. Cross-country races are always for a social cause like Run for Peace, Run for Our Kargil Heroes, Plant More Trees, etc. The school provides special coaching for basketball, chess, cross-country race, softball, tennis, table tennis, track and field, volleyball and other games like cricket as per student demand. College teams participate in inter-college and open tournaments. Many students are selected to represent Delhi in the All India Inter University competitions and national-level competitions.

The college organizes an inter-college table tennis tournament for men and women. The other important date in the sports calendar is the college's Annual Sports Day.

=== International collaborations and exchange programmes ===
A team of 17 students and three faculty members from the Utrecht Business School, Hogeschool Utrecht University of Applied Sciences visited the University of Delhi for an inter-cultural contact program from 19 to 23 October 2009. Miranda House and Sri Ram College of Commerce hosted this team through a week-long course on management and culture. Sixteen students from Miranda House and fifteen from Sri Ram College of Commerce participated in the program. The program was the second of a series initiated in 2008 with support from K. Sreenivas, dean of international relations at University of Delhi. It was initiated by presentations by students from each country showcasing their business and cultural environments. Students then attended a series of workshops and lectures on aspects of inter-cultural business interactions and marketing. These sessions were conducted by faculty from the Utrecht Business School as well as Delhi University.

=== Students' Union ===
The Students' Union consists of the president, vice president, general secretary and two central councillors. These office bearers are elected by the students. The Students' Union organizes TEMPEST, the annual cultural festival of Miranda House, and addresses all student-related problems.

=== Activism ===
In 1970 the Miss Miranda beauty contest was abolished by an overwhelming majority of students despite strong opposition by the principal and faculty members. Led by the president of the Student Union, feminist activist Madhu Kishwar, the students protested against beauty being the criterion for the contest.

During the Sikh riots in Delhi in 1984, students of Miranda House organized relief camps for the victims. Film-maker Shonali Bose, who was a student at Miranda, made the Sikh riots the subject of her film Amu.

Students protested "unreasonable curfew times" for women in 2015, in a campaign called Pinjra Tod (English: Break the Cage)."

== Former principals ==
- Veda Thakurdas (1948–1956), the founder principal of Miranda House, was the first woman to do an MA in mathematics from Punjab University in 1930 and a Tripos from Cambridge. Retired: 1966-67. Died: 26 February 1984.
- S. Krishnaswamy (1957–1964), the principal of Maharani College, Bangalore, before coming to Miranda House.
- M. Chandy (1964–1971) was teaching in the department of zoology, University of Delhi, before joining Miranda House as principal.
- A. C. Janaki amma (1971–1981) joined Miranda House as a lecturer in 1948. She obtained her doctorate from the London School of Economics.
- T. S. Rukmani (1982–1993), a former student of Miranda House (1949–1954), she taught Sanskrit in I.P. College, University of Delhi, before assuming charge of Miranda House and was also the secretary of N.C.W.E.B., University of Delhi. She was awarded, D. Litt. by the University of Delhi. As of 2012, she held the chair of Hindu Studies at Concordia University, Montreal.
- Kiran Datar (1993 to 2000) is an old Mirandian. She obtained her Ph.D. from Jawaharlal Nehru University, Delhi. She was awarded the Mahila Shiromani Award in 1994 for excellence in a chosen field of activity (education).
- Dr. Pratibha Jolly (2005-2019).

== Notable alumni ==
Notable alumni include:

- Aditi Phadnis, political journalist
- Anita Desai, author
- Anita Pratap, TV and print journalist
- Amita Dhanda, legal academic and disability activist
- Anjolie Ela Menon, artist
- Anuja Chauhan, author
- Brinda Karat, politician
- Gaiti Hasan, scientist
- Gloria Steinem, American journalist, social rights and womens rights activist
- Indrani Dasgupta, model
- Jasleen Dhamija, textile historian
- Jalabala Vaidya, stage actress
- Lakshmipriya Devi, filmmaker and BAFTA Winner
- Minissha Lamba, actress
- Mouni Roy, Actress
- Madhu Kishwar, social activist
- Madhur Jaffrey, actress, author of cookbooks
- Mallika Sherawat, actress and model
- Medha Shri Dahiya, Journalist
- Meira Kumar, first female Speaker of Lok Sabha & Member of Parliament, India
- Mira Nair, filmmaker
- Nandita Das, filmmaker and actress
- Nalini Singh, journalist
- Neha Dixit, journalist and writer
- Neeti Mohan, singer
- Nina Sibal, diplomat and writer
- Rati Pandey, actress
- Ritu Menon, feminist and writer
- Seema Kohli, contemporary artist, sculptor and poet
- Sheila Dikshit, politician, former Chief Minister of Delhi
- Shakti Mohan, performer
- Shonali Bose, filmmaker
- Shovana Narayan, Kathak dancer, Indian government officer, awarded Padma Shri
- Shyamala Pappu, lawyer
- Swara Bhaskar, actress
- Syeda Saiyidain Hameed, member of the Planning Commission, awarded Padma Shri
- Tripurari Sharma, theatre director, NSD professor, Sangeet Natak Akademi Award (2012)
- Urvashi Butalia, feminist and historian

== In popular culture ==
Filmmaker and Miranda House alumnus Mira Nair shot scenes of her movie The Reluctant Fundamentalist, starring Riz Ahmed and Kate Hudson, at Miranda House.

Miranda House also appears in Neeraj Pandey's Akshay Kumar starrer Special 26. Pandey needed to replicate CBI headquarters, for which the crew recommended the heritage hall at Miranda House. Scenes of Rakeysh Omprakash Mehra’s acclaimed movie Bhaag Milkha Bhaag with Farhan Akhtar in the lead were shot in the college. The introduction song "Fukrey" and most of the college sequences of the film were shot in Miranda House.

Kabir Singh starring Shahid Kapoor and Kiara Advani was also shot in the campus.
