= Radha Kumar =

Indian feminist, academic and author

Radha Kumar is an Indian feminist, academic and author. Her work focuses on ethnic conflicts and peace processes from a strongly feminist perspective.

== Early life ==
Kumar is the daughter of Lovraj Kumar, a former bureaucrat and the economic historian Dr Dharma Kumar. While Lovraj Kumar belongs to Uttarakhand, Dharma hails from a Tamil Brahmin family from south India. Radha Kumar grew up in Delhi and studied in Modern School (New Delhi),later pursuing her bachelor education from Miranda House,University of Delhi.

She studied for her master's degree in English Literature at Newnham College, Cambridge, (the college at which her mother had previously studied), before taking her PhD at Jawaharlal Nehru University.

== Career ==
Kumar has written several books on a wide range of subjects, mostly dealing with gender issues in a conflict situation. Usually, the conflicts that she has chosen to address in this manner have involved a Muslim party or a communist party or both of these. Kumar has been a director at the Nelson Mandela Centre for Peace and Conflict Resolution at Jamia Milia Islamia, a Muslim minority institution located in Delhi. She is also co-founder and Director-General of the Delhi Policy Group, a think-tank which has received generous funding from US-based agencies including the Ford Foundation.

Kumar, along with over 40 historians, economists, academics, activists, artists, entrepreneurs, lawyers, and media personalities from 13 countries, was invited to speak at the South Asia Union Summit Led by Women which was held virtually from October 2–3, 2021. This goal of the summit is to discuss solutions for peace, social justice and gender equality.

== Kashmir interlocutor panel ==
In October 2010, Kumar was appointed as one of the three interlocutors for Jammu and Kashmir appointed by the Cabinet Committee on Security (CCS) of the Central Government of India. The panel was headed by Dilip Padgaonkar, former editor of the Times of India. and the other member was M.M. Ansari, a former Election Commissioner of India.

Within a few weeks of the panel's constitution, and after private hints had failed, a public reprimand was issued to the panel by P. Chidambaram, home minister of India, for speaking too freely and too frequently to the press; and also for pushing various schemes and solutions, when the assigned job of the panel was to gauge and summarize the views and ideas of Kashmiri society. All of these criticisms pertained to actions taken by Kumar. Her reaction to the reprimand was to tell the press that the home minister (who had appointed the panel) had no business to tell the interlocutors what they should do.

== Published works ==
- Divide and Fall?: Bosnia in the Annals of Partition
- Negotiating Peace in Deeply Divided Societies: A Set of Simulations
- Making Peace with Partition
- The History of Doing: An Illustrated Account of Movements for Women's Rights and Feminism in India 1800–1990
- Bosnia-Herzegovina: Between War and Peace(Co editor)
- Frameworks For A Kashmir Settlement
- Paradise at war: A political history of Kashmir
- The Republic Relearnt: Renewing Indian Democracy (1947-2024)
