= Urvashi Butalia =

Indian feminist and historian

Padma Shri Urvashi Butalia
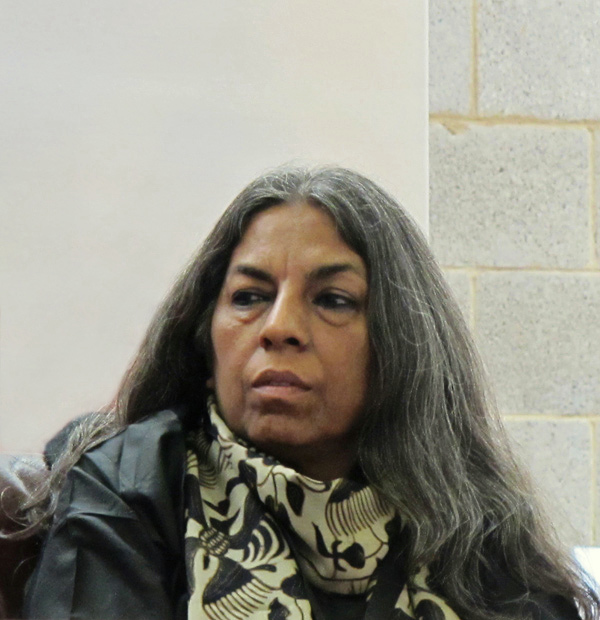
- Urvashi Butalia in 2011
- Born: 1952 (age 73–74); Ambala, Haryana, India
- Education: University of Delhi; University of London
- Occupations: Publisher and historian Co-founder of Kali for Women (1984); Founder of Zubaan Books (2003)
- Relatives: Pankaj Butalia
- Website: zubaanbooks.com

Urvashi Butalia (born 1952) is an Indian feminist writer, publisher, and activist. She is known for her work in the women's movement of India, as well as for authoring books such as The Other Side of Silence: Voices from and the Partition of India and Speaking Peace: Women's Voices from Kashmir. She is a visiting faculty at Ashoka University.

Along with Ritu Menon, she co-founded Kali for Women, India's first feminist publishing house, in 1984. In 2003, she founded Zubaan Books, an imprint of Kali for Women.

In 2011, Butalia and Menon were jointly awarded the Padma Shri, India's fourth highest civilian award, for their work in literature and education.

== Early life and education ==
Butalia was born in Ambala, Punjab, into a progressive and atheist family of Punjabi heritage. Her mother, Subhadra Butalia, ran a counselling centre for women. Butalia has one older sister, Bela, and two brothers, Pankaj and Rahul. Pankaj Butalia is a left-wing documentary filmmaker best known for a documentary on the miserable conditions of widows living in Vrindavan.

Butalia earned a BA in literature from Miranda House, Delhi University, in 1971, a master's degree in literature from Delhi University in 1973, and a master's in South Asian studies from the University of London in 1977. She speaks Hindi, Punjabi, Bengali, English, Italian, and French.

== Career ==
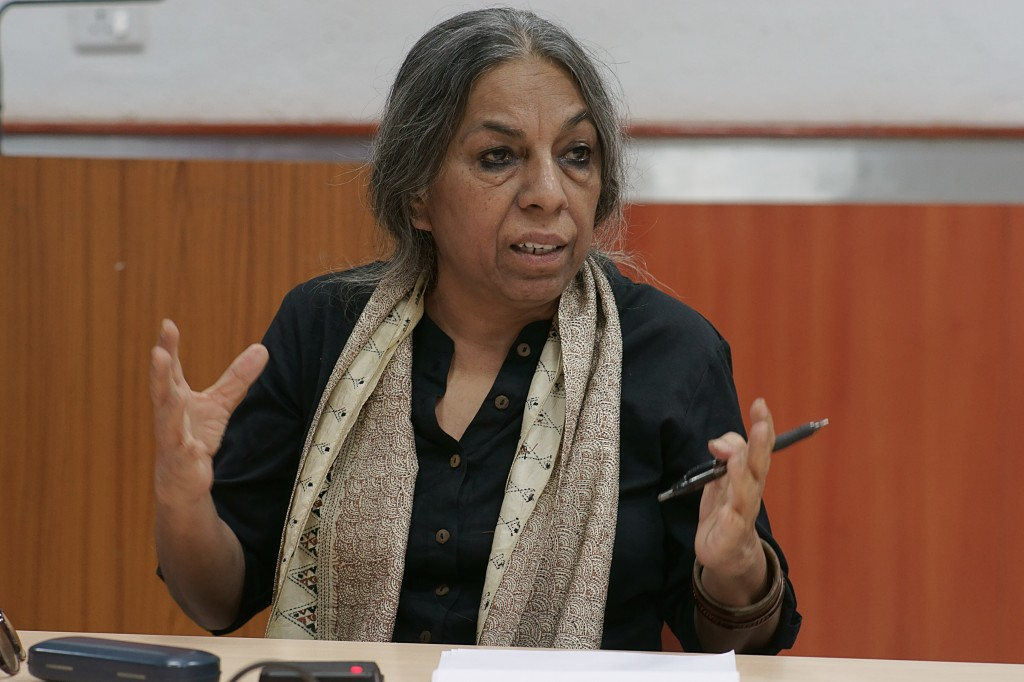
Urvashi Butalia in October 2016

Butalia started her career working with Oxford University Press in Delhi. She worked for a year at their Oxford headquarters, before moving briefly to London-based Zed Books as an editor in 1982. She then returned to India and, along with Ritu Menon, set up a feminist publishing house, Kali for Women, in 1984.

Butalia for the Young India Fellowship at Ashoka University.

Butalia's main areas of interest are the Partition of India and oral histories from a feminist and left-wing perspective. She has written on gender, communalism, fundamentalism, and media. Her writings have appeared in several newspapers and magazines, including The Guardian, the New Internationalist, The Statesman, The Times of India, Outlook and India Today. She has been a regular columnist for the left-wing Tehelka and for Indian Printer and Publisher, a business-to-business (B2B) publication dealing with the print and publishing industry.

Butalia is a consultant for Oxfam India and holds the position of reader at the College of Vocational Studies at the University of Delhi.

=== Kali for Women ===
Kali for Women, India's first exclusively feminist publishing house, which Butalia co-founded with Ritu Menon, was set up in 1984 as a trust to increase the body of knowledge on women in the Third World, to give voice to such knowledge as already exists, and provide a forum for women writers, creatives, and academics.

In 2003, co-founders Butalia and Menon parted ways. Both went on to set up their own imprints under the banner of Kali for Women, with Menon establishing Women Unlimited and Butalia founding Zubaan Books.

=== Zubaan Books ===
Originally set up as a non-profit in 2003, Zubaan now operates as a private company. The independent publishing house publishes fiction and academic books, "on, for, by and about women in South Asia," with including by authors such as Jaishree Misra, Manjula Padmanabhan, Suniti Namjoshi and Annie Zaidi.

=== The Other Side of Silence ===
Apart from several newspaper articles and op-ed pieces dealing with feminist issues, Butalia has authored and co-authored several books. The Other Side of Silence (1998), the product of more than seventy interviews conducted with survivors of the Partition, is used as an academic text in some Indian universities.

The Goethe Institute has described it as "one of the most influential books in South Asian studies to be published in recent decades [...] It emphasises the role of violence against women in the collective experience of tragedy." The Other Side of Silence won the Oral History Book Association Award in 2001 and the Nikkei Asia Prize for Culture in 2003.

=== Activism ===
Butalia is an associate of the Women's Institute for Freedom of the Press (WIFP).

== Awards and recognition ==
In 2000, Butalia won the Pandora Award from Women in Publishing.

In 2011, Butalia was awarded the Padma Shri by the Government of India.

In 2017, the Goethe Institute awarded Butalia the Goethe Medal, an official decoration of the Federal Republic of Germany that "honors individuals who have displayed exceptional competence of the German language as well as in international cultural exchange."

== Works ==
- Urvashi Butalia; Ritu Menon (1992). In Other Words: New Writing by Indian Women. Kali for Women. ISBN 978-81-85107-48-6.
- Urvashi Butalia; Ritu Menon (1995). Making a Difference: Feminist Publishing in the South. Bellagio Publishing Network. ISBN 9780964078086.
- Tanika Sarkar; Urvashi Butalia (1995). Women and the Hindu Right: A Collection of Essays. Kali For Women. ISBN 978-81-85107-66-0.
- Tanika Sarkar; Urvashi Butalia (1995). Women and Right Wing Movements: Indian Experiences. London: Zed Books. ISBN 978-1-85649-289-8.
- Urvashi Butalia (1998). The Other Side of Silence: Voices from the Partition of India. Penguin Books India. ISBN 978-0-14-027171-3.
- Urvashi Butalia (2002). Speaking Peace: Women's Voices from Kashmir. Kali for Women. ISBN 978-81-86706-43-5.
- Urvashi Butalia, ed. (2006). Inner Line: The Zubaan Book of Stories by Indian Women. Zubaan. ISBN 978-81-89013-77-6.
