= Krishnasami Venkataraman =

Indian chemist (1901–1981)

Krishnaswami Venkataraman
- Born: 7 June 1901; Chennai, British India
- Died: 12 May 1981 (aged 79)
- Education: University of Madras; University of Manchester; Mendeleev Institute of Chemical Technology
- Known for: Baker-Venkataraman transformation
- Relatives: K. Swaminathan (brother); Krishnaswami Srinivas Sanjivi (brother); Madhav Sharma (nephew)
- Awards: 1961 Padma Bhushan; 1975 INSA Professor TR Seshadri Medal; ICS PC Ray Medal
- Scientific career
- Fields: Organic chemistry
- Workplaces: National Chemical Laboratory; University of Mumbai; University Department of Chemical Technology; Forman Christian College
- Doctoral advisor: Robert Robinson
- Doctoral students: B. D. Tilak; Nitya Anand; A. V. Rama Rao

Krishnaswami Venkataraman FNA, FASc, FNASc, FRSC (7 June 1901 – 12 May 1981), popularly known as KV, was an Indian organic chemist and the first Indian director at National Chemical Laboratory (NCL Pune) and University Department of Chemical Technology, Mumbai (UDCT). He was known for the demonstration of an organic chemical reaction involving 2-acetoxyacetophenones which later came to be known as the Baker–Venkataraman rearrangement and for his contributions in developing NCL into one of the leading research centres in organic chemistry. He was an elected fellow of several science academies which included the Royal Society of Chemistry, Academy of Sciences Leopoldina, USSR Academy of Sciences, Prussian Academy of Sciences, Polish Academy of Sciences, Indian Academy of Sciences, and the Indian National Science Academy. The Government of India awarded him the Padma Bhushan, the third highest Indian civilian award, in 1961.

== Biography ==
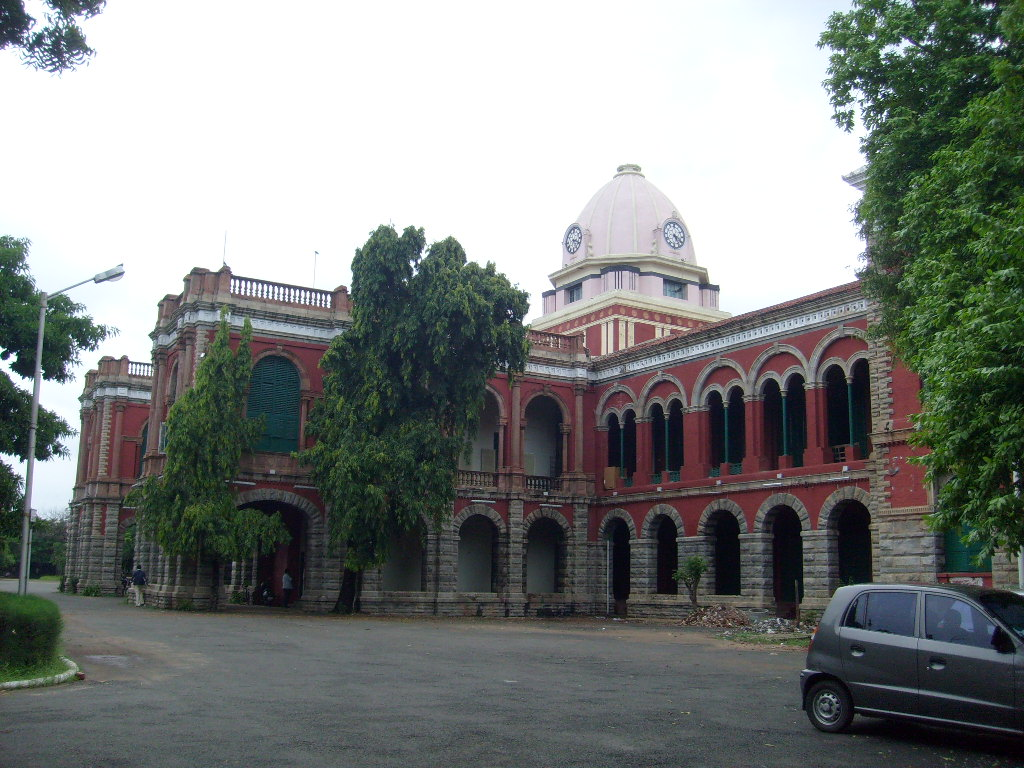
Chennai Presidency College

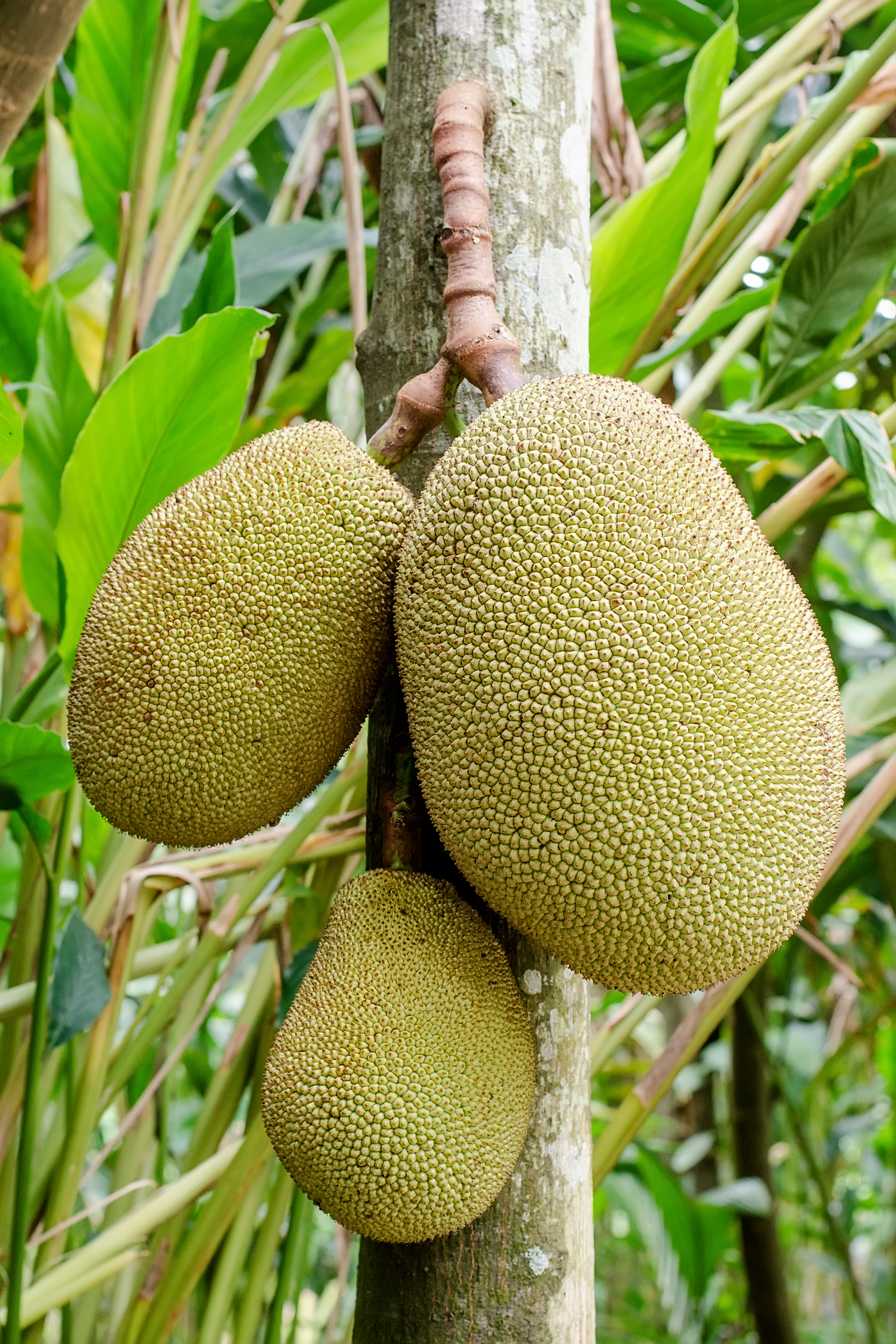
Jackfruit

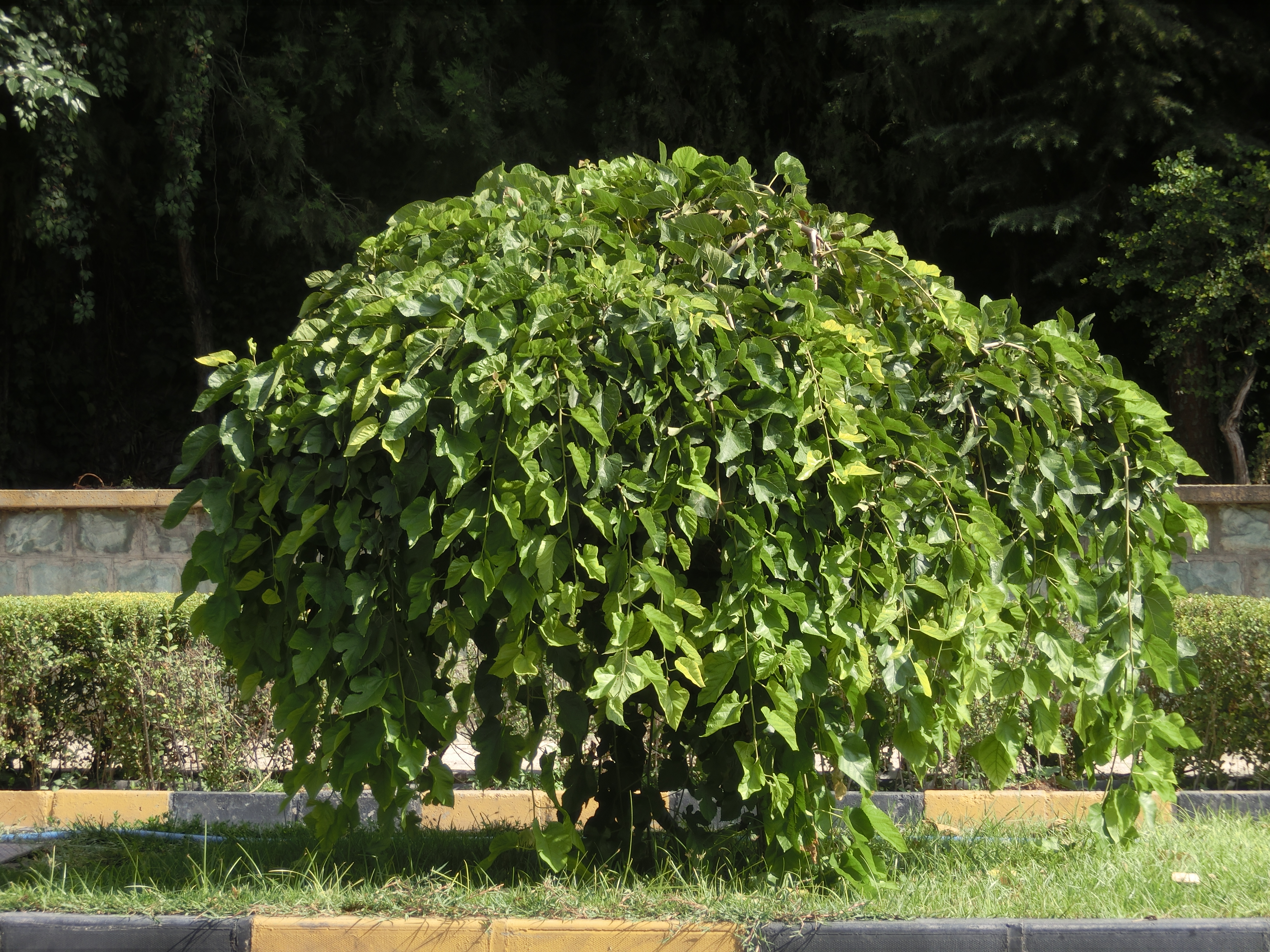
Morus alba

Krishnaswami Venkataraman was born on 7 June 1901 in Madras (present-day Chennai), Madras Presidency during the British Colonial rule, in a learned Tamil Brahmin family, to P. S. Krishnaswami, a civil engineer, Sanskrit scholar and the translator of Valmiki Ramayana into Tamil, as the middle-born of his three sons. His brothers were K. Swaminathan, a professor of English who was the chief editor of the collected works of Mohandas Karamchand Gandhi and Krishnaswami Srinivas Sanjivi, a noted medical doctor who founded Voluntary Health Services and is considered by many to be the father of the primary health care movement in India. Madhav Sharma, an actor of films and television, is his nephew.

He studied chemistry at Presidency College, Madras and obtained his MA from Madras University in 1923. Subsequently, he moved to England where he joined the University of Manchester on a scholarship from the Government of Tamil Nadu and obtained MSc (Tech) in colour chemistry. He remained in England for his doctoral research, along with another noted chemist, T. R. Seshadri, at the laboratory of Robert Robinson which earned him a PhD and later a DSc from the University of Manchester.

On his return to India in 1927, he worked at the Indian Institute of Science as a research fellow for almost a year and in 1928, joined Forman Christian College, Lahore (then part of undivided India). He stayed in Lahore until 1934 when he joined the then newly formed University Department of Chemical Technology (UDCT-present-day Institute of Chemical Technology) of the University of Bombay as a reader and became a full Professor of Chemical Engineering in 1936. In 1938, he was appointed as the head of the department and as the director in 1943, thus becoming the first Indian director of the Institute. After retiring from UDCT in 1957, he became the third director of the National Chemical Laboratory (NCL), Pune, the first Indian director to hold the post. He served as the director of NCL until 1966, but continued his association with the laboratory eve after his retirement.

Venkataraman married Shakunthala at the age of nineteen when his bride was only fourteen. The couple had one daughter, Dharma Kumar, who went on to become a noted economic historian. Lovraj Kumar, an Indian civil servant and a former secretary of the ministries of Petroleum and Natural Gas and Steel, was his son-in-law and Radha Kumar, a noted author, historian, feminist and academic was his granddaughter. Venkataraman died on 12 May 1981 at New Delhi, survived by his wife and daughter.

== Scientific and professional contributions ==
One of the major scientific achievements of Venkataraman was his experiments with 2-acetoxyacetophenones when he demonstrated, along with Wilson Baker, an English organic chemist, that the compound transformed into o-hydroxydibenzoylmethanes and finally to flavones which later came to be known as Baker-Venkataraman transformation. This process, a variant of Allan–Robinson reaction, is in use for the synthesis of flavones and chromones. Through his experiments with Artocarpus heterophyllus, commonly known as Jackfruit, he was able to isolate artocarpanone, a tyrosinase inhibitor, as well as eight flavones and later, he isolated similar flavones from Morus alba (White Mulberry). These experiments helped establish the taxonomical relationship between the two species. (Note: Page 152)

Shortly after the Second World War, Venkataraman was invited for a visit IG Farben, a German dyestuff manufacturing company, and this gave him an opportunity to study the international dyestuff industry. (Note: Page 154) He collected data which was later copied and published as an 8-volume book, The Chemistry of Synthetic Dyes, which is considered by many as a seminal work on dye chemistry. He also submitted a report to the Government of India for the development of dyestuff and intermediaries industry in India, known as the Pai/Venkataraman report which paved way for the development of the industry in the country, earning him the moniker, the father of the Indian dyestuff industry.

Another of Venkataraman's contributions was his work on lac pigments. He focused his research on the chemistry of laccaic acid and later on other anthraquinonoid insect pigments. With the help of his findings, he proposed revised structures for kermesic acid and ceroalbolinic acid. (Note: Quoted directly from source) He was the first scientist in India to use X-ray crystallography for finding solutions to problems of organic structure.

During his tenure at UDCT, Venkataraman was instrumental in starting several courses chemical technology, combining pure science and technology. He guided around 85 students in their doctoral research which included such notable chemists as B. D. Tilak, B. S. Joshi, Nitya Anand and A. V. Rama Rao. (Note: Page 155) His contributions are reported in the development of National Chemical Laboratory into one of World's leading research centre in dyestuff chemistry. He sat in the editorial boards of many journals, which included Tetrahedron, Tetrahedron Letters and Indian Journal of Chemistry. Besides The Chemistry of Synthetic Dyes, he also edited another 612-page book, The Analytical Chemistry of Synthetic Dyes and these nine books remain reference texts in the discipline. Besides, he also published 271 scientific articles.

Venkataraman served as the president of the Indian Academy of Sciences for three terms (1943–46, 1949–55, 1965–67) and as the vice president from 1952 to 1955. He also served as the vice president of the Indian National Science Academy.

== Awards ==
Venkataraman was elected a fellow of the Chemical Society (FCS) in 1932, which became the Royal Society of Chemistry in 1980. He was elected a founding fellow of the Indian Academy of Sciences (FASc) in 1934, and as a Fellow of the National Institute of Sciences of India (FNI, now the Indian National Science Academy in 1939. (Note: Prior to 1970, the Indian National Science Academy was named the "National Institute of Sciences of India", and its fellows bore the post-nominal "FNI". The post-nominal became "FNA" in 1970 when the association adopted its present name.) He was also a fellow of the National Academy of Sciences, India (FNASc). In 1960, Academy of Sciences Leopoldina elected him as a member. He was also a fellow of the Prussian Academy of Sciences, USSR Academy of Sciences, and the Polish Academy of Sciences.

The Government of India awarded Venkataraman the third highest civilian award of the Padma Bhushan in 1961. He received the Professor T. R. Seshadri 60th birthday commemoration medal in 1973. He was also a recipient of the Acharya P.C. Ray Medal of the Indian Chemical Society.

== Bibliography ==
- Krishnasami Venkataraman (1952). The Chemistry of Synthetic Dyes - Volume 1. Academic Press. ISBN 9780127170015.
- Krishnasami Venkataraman (1969). The chemistry of synthetic dyes - Volume II. Acad. Press. ISBN 9780127170022.
- Krishnasami Venkataraman (1978). The chemistry of synthetic dyes - Vol III. Academic Press. ISBN 9780127170046.
- K., Venkataraman (1971). The Chemistry of Synthetic Dyes Volume IV. Oxford: Elsevier Science. ISBN 9780323145701.
- The chemistry of synthetic dyes. Volume V. New York: Academic Press. 1971. ISBN 9780323142953.
- The chemistry of synthetic dyes Volume VI. New York: Academic Press. 1972. ISBN 9780323148597.
- Krishnasami Venkataraman (1974). The chemistry of synthetic dyes Volume VII. Academic Press. ISBN 978-0-12-717007-7.
- The Analytical chemistry of synthetic dyes. New York: Wiley. 1977. ISBN 978-0471905752. OCLC 2542360.
- The chemistry of synthetic dyes Volume VIII. New York: Academic Press. 1978. ISBN 9780323149372. OCLC 849921776.

== See also ==
- Subramania Ranganathan
- T. R. Govindachari
