= Jairam Ramesh =

Indian politician

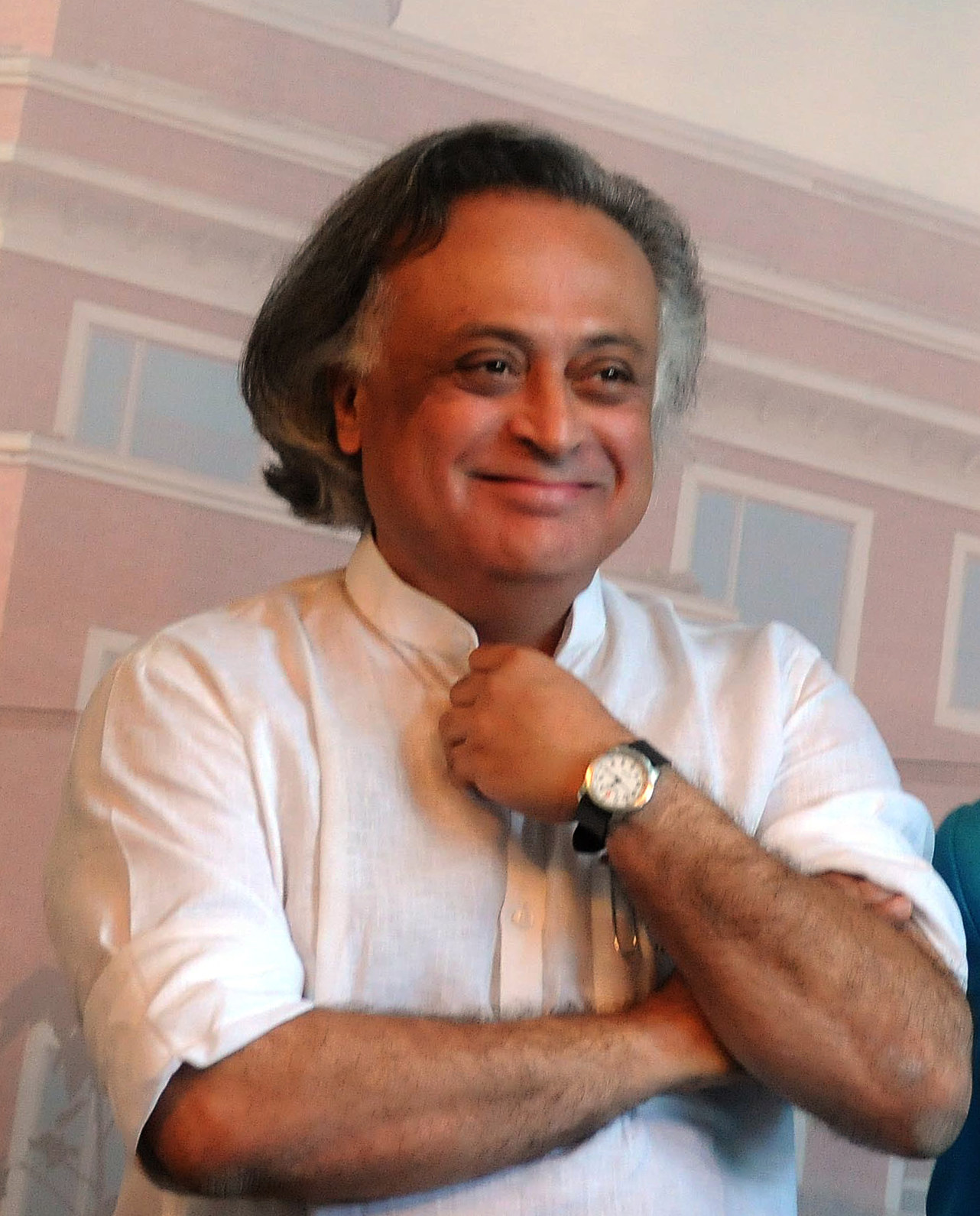
- Jairam in 2012

Union Minister of Rural Development
- In office 13 July 2011 – 26 May 2014
- Prime Minister: Manmohan Singh
- Preceded by: Vilasrao Deshmukh
- Succeeded by: Gopinath Munde

Union Ministry of Environment and Forests
- In office 28 May 2009 – 12 July 2011
- Prime Minister: Manmohan Singh
- Preceded by: Manmohan Singh
- Succeeded by: Jayanthi Natarajan

Member of Parliament, Rajya Sabha
- Incumbent
- Assumed office 1 July 2016
- Preceded by: Aayanur Manjunath
- Constituency: Karnataka
- In office 22 June 2004 – 21 June 2016
- Preceded by: Yadlapati Venkata Rao
- Succeeded by: Y. S. Chowdary
- Constituency: Andhra Pradesh

Personal details
- Born: 9 April 1954 (age 72) Chikmagalur, Mysore State, India (now in Karnataka, India)
- Party: Indian National Congress
- Spouse: K. R. Jayashree (m. 1981; died 2019)
- Education: IIT Bombay (B.Tech.); Carnegie Mellon University (M.S.)
- Occupation: Politician
- As of 25 January, 2007

Jairam Ramesh (born 9 April 1954) is a senior Indian politician to the Indian National Congress. He is a Member of Parliament representing Karnataka state in the Rajya Sabha. In July 2011, Jairam was elevated to the Union Council of Ministers of India and appointed Minister of Rural Development and Minister (additional charge) of the new Ministry of Drinking Water and Sanitation. However, in the cabinet reshuffle in October 2012, he was divested of the portfolio of Ministry of Drinking Water and Sanitation. He was previously the Indian Minister of State (Independent Charge) at the Ministry of Environment and Forests from May 2009 to July 2011.

== Personal ==
Jairam Ramesh was born in a Iyengar family on 9 April 1954 in Chikmagalur, Karnataka, India. His father was C. K. Ramesh, and his mother, Sridevi Ramesh. His father was a professor of civil engineering in IIT Bombay. He considers himself a practising Hindu with Buddhism ingrained and calls himself a 'Hind-Budh'.

He married K. R. Jayashree on 26 January 1981. He currently resides at Lodi Gardens, Rajesh Pilot Marg, New Delhi. Till his election to Rajya Sabha from Karnataka in July 2016, his permanent residence was at Khairatabad, Hyderabad, Telangana. His wife died in early 2019.

Since childhood, Jairam has been strongly influenced by Jawaharlal Nehru. He was fascinated by Nehru's anglicised, supposedly modern approach to life, changes brought by him in a traditional society and his alleged liberal, humanist, rational approach to life, women and civic matters. He considers himself a product of the Nehruvian era in many ways. An additional influence was Mahatma Gandhi, whom he earlier saw as anti-modern, anti-science and anti-West. As he grew older and read Gandhi more and viewed him in the political and historical context in which he operated, he came to appreciate and acknowledge Gandhi much more. He has also studied Rabindranath Tagore deeply.

== Education ==
Jairam attended St. Xavier's School, Ranchi in 1961–1963 from grade 3 to 5. In his youth, he was intrigued by the ideas of Paul Samuelson on issues such as population and growth, that got him thinking of economics and issues of life. When Ramesh was 17, in 1971, he read Asian Drama, one of the early books of Gunnar Myrdal and wrote to him at the Stockholm International Peace Research Institute. Myrdal sent him a reply and asked to stay in touch. Asian Drama was very influential to Jairam's understanding of development planning in India.

Jairam graduated from IIT Bombay in 1975 with a B.Tech. in Mechanical Engineering. Between 1975 and 1977 he studied at Carnegie Mellon University's Heinz College and received a Master of Science in Public Policy and Public Management. In 1977–78, he started on the Doctoral program at the Massachusetts Institute of Technology, where he enrolled in the inter-disciplinary course on technology policy, economics, engineering, and management . However, he did not continue with the program.

He is a member of the International Council of the New York-based Asia Society. Jairam has been a Visiting Fellow and Affiliated Researcher of the Institute of Chinese Studies, New Delhi, since 2002.

== Career ==
In 1978, Jairam joined the World Bank for a short assignment. He returned to India in December 1979 and worked as assistant to economist Lovraj Kumar at the Bureau of Industrial Costs and Prices. From 1983 to 1985 he was Officer on Special Duty in the Advisory Board of Energy. He then worked in the Planning Commission (advisor to Abid Hussain), Ministry of Industry and other economic departments of the Central Government, including: analysing energy policy during 1983–85, reorganising the CSIR in 1986 and implementing technology missions during 1987–89.

In 1990, he worked as an "Officer on Special Duty" during the National Front administration of the V.P. Singh government. He reorganised India's international trade agencies in 1990 and was OSD to the Prime Minister in 1991. But he was removed from PMO within few weeks. In 1991 he worked in Manmohan Singh's finance ministry in the P. V. Narasimha Rao administration.

Jairam participated in India's economic reforms in 1991 and 1997. He was advisor to the Deputy Chairman of the Planning Commission in 1992–94, served on special mission to Jammu and Kashmir during 1993–95 and was advisor to Finance Minister Palaniappan Chidambaram between 1996 and 1998. The central government invited him to join the official delegation to the World Trade Organization meeting in Seattle in 1999.

From 2000 to 2002, Jairam served as deputy chairman, State Planning Board, Government of Karnataka and on the Economic Advisory Council of Andhra Pradesh. He also served on the eminent persons group of the Union Ministry of Power and other key government committees.

Jairam also served as Secretary in the All India Congress Committee, Deputy Chairman of the Karnataka Planning Board (2000–2002), member of the Rajasthan Development Council (1999–2003), and Economic Advisor to the government of the state of Chhattisgarh (2001–03). He was a member of the Congress Party's electoral strategy team for the 2004 Lok Sabha cycle.

In June 2004, he was elected to represent Adilabad District, Andhra Pradesh in the Rajya Sabha. Following the formation of the Congress-led United Progressive Alliance (UPA) government in 2004, he joined the National Advisory Council, where he helped put together UPA's National Common Minimum Program. From August 2004 – January 2006 he was a member of three committees of Parliament: the Public Accounts Committee, the Standing Committee on Finance and the Committee on Government Assurances and was a member of the Court of the Jawaharlal Nehru University.

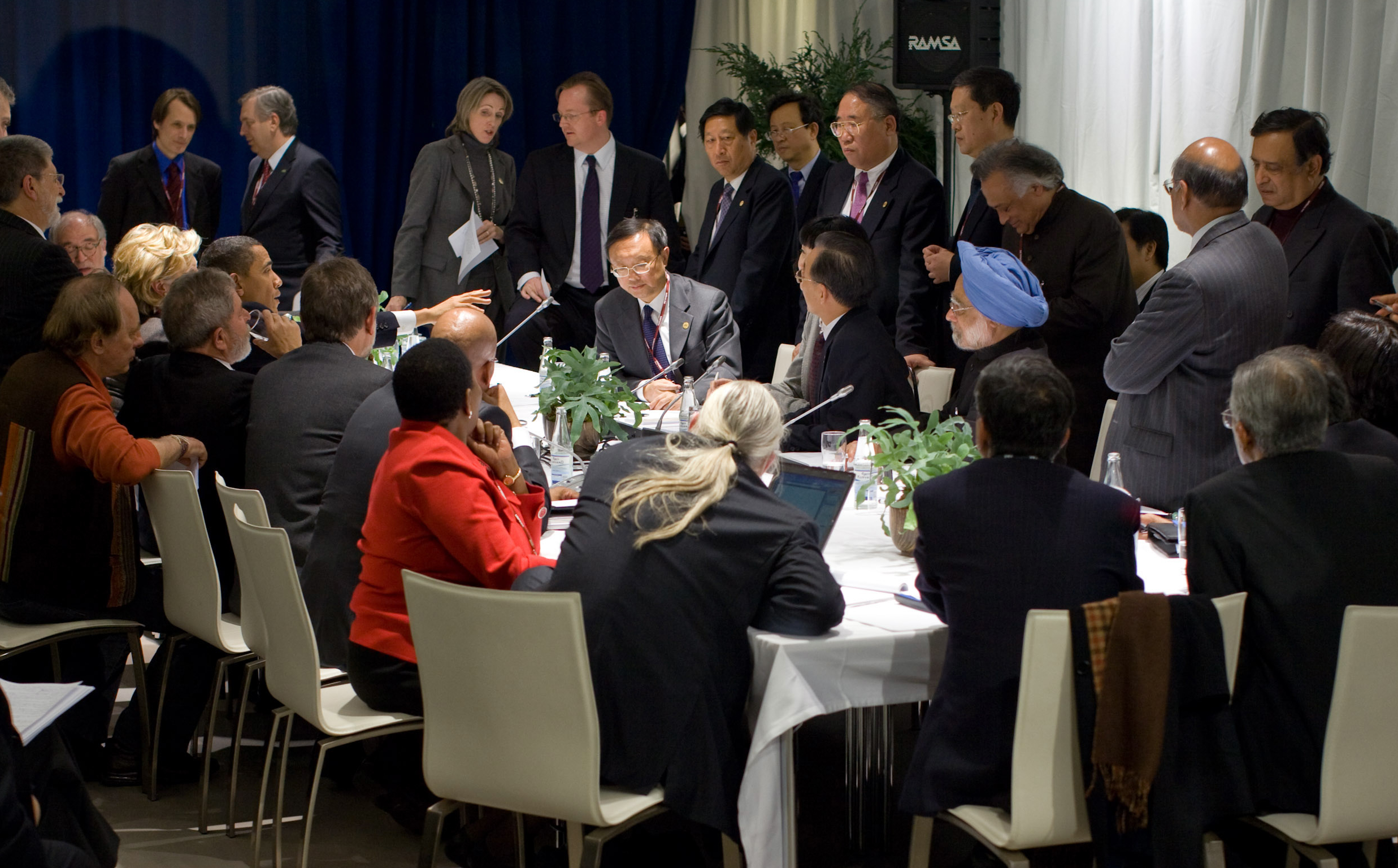
Jairam With Prime Minister Manmohan Singh, during a multilateral meeting of US President Barack Obama with Singh and the other leaders of the BASIC Bloc: Chinese Premier Wen Jiabao, Brazilian President Lula da Silva and South African President Jacob Zuma during the United Nations Climate Change Conference, 18 Dec 2009.

In February 2009, with the 15th Lok Sabha elections approaching, he led the party's Poll Strategy Panel. At that time he resigned his posts as Minister of State for Power and Minister of State for Commerce and Industry.

Following his 2009 re-election to the Indian Parliament, on 28 May 2009 Jairam was given independent charge of Environment and Forests as Minister of State in the Congress-led administration. He was chief negotiator for India at the 2009 United Nations Climate Change Conference held in Copenhagen, Denmark, between 7 and 18 December 2009.

Jairam was part of the 19-member 'Foundation Day Committee' of the All India Congress Committee (AICC), under the chairmanship of party president Sonia Gandhi, for planning the 2010 year-long celebrations of the 125th anniversary of the Congress Party.

On 12 July 2011, Jairam was promoted to Cabinet Minister and reassigned to charge of the Ministry for Rural Development and on 13 July 2011 was named Minister (Additional Charge) of the new Ministry of Drinking Water and Sanitation.

Jairam has accepted the offer to serve as a member of the International Advisory Board (IAB) which gives strategic policy advice to the executive director of United Nations Environment Programme (UNEP) on the programmatic direction of International Environmental Technology Centre (IETC).

On 16 June 2022, Jairam was appointed Head of Media, including Social & Digital Media of Indian National Congress Party.

Jairam Ramesh became a Member of Parliament, Rajya Sabha on a ticket from Indian National Congress Party.

== Election History ==
=== Rajya Sabha ===
Position	Party	Constituency	From	To	Tenure
Member of Parliament, Rajya Sabha (1st Term)	INC	Andhra Pradesh	22 June 2004	21 June 2010	5 years, 364 days
Member of Parliament, Rajya Sabha (2nd Term)	INC	Andhra Pradesh	22 June 2010	20 June 2016	5 years, 364 days
Member of Parliament, Rajya Sabha (3rd Term)	INC	Karnataka	1 July 2016	30 June 2022	5 years, 364 days
Member of Parliament, Rajya Sabha (4th Term)	INC	Karnataka	1 July 2022	30 June 2028	5 years, 365 days

== Controversies ==
During his tenure, he falsely accused the villagers of Pithampur in Madhya Pradesh of secretly smuggling out toxic waste from Carbide factory and dumping it. Later he had to apologise and also assured that he would not repeat such action and will take villagers in consultation.

On 19 December 2020, Jairam tendered apology to Vivek Doval and his family in regard to defamation case filed by latter, after Jairam accused Vivek Doval of dealing with black money syndicate as per an article published in The Caravan under the title of The D Companies. Jairam was out on bail issued in May 2019 by Delhi High Court.

== Journalism ==
Jairam's been a columnist for the Business Standard, Business Today, The Telegraph, Times of India and India Today, sometimes under the pen-name "Kautilya".

He has also anchored a number of popular television programmes on business and the economy, including Business Breakfast and Crossfire. Jairam is the author of the books:

- Making Sense of Chindia: Reflections on China and India (2005), Foreword by Strobe Talbott.
- Mobilising Technology for World Development (Co-editor, 1979)
- To The Brink and Back : India's 1991 Story (2015)
- One History, New Geography (2016)
- Indira Gandhi: A Life in Nature (2017)
- Intertwined Lives: P.N. Haksar & Indira Gandhi (2018)
- A Chequered Brilliance: The Many Lives of V.K. Krishna Menon (2019)
- THE LIGHT OF ASIA (2021)

== See also ==
- Ministry of Commerce and Industry (India)
- Ministry of Power (India)
