= Global Icons =

2011 non-fiction book by Bishnupriya Ghosh

Global Icons: Apertures to the Popular
- Author: Bishnupriya Ghosh
- Publisher: Duke University Press
- Publication date: 2011
- Pages: 383

Global Icons: Apertures to the Popular is a biography of Phoolan Devi, Mother Teresa, and Arundhati Roy. Written by Bishnupriya Ghosh, it was published in 2011 by Duke University Press.

== General references ==
- Bloomer, Kristin (2015). "Review of Global Icons: Apertures to the Popular". International Journal of Hindu Studies. 19 (3): 339–342. ISSN 1022-4556.
- Jasper, Daniel A. (2012). "Review of Global Icons: Apertures to the Popular". The Journal of Asian Studies. 71 (4): 1174–1176. ISSN 0021-9118.
- Prestholdt, Jeremy (December 2012). "Book Review: Bishnupriya Ghosh, Global Icons: Apertures to the Popular". The Indian Economic & Social History Review. 49 (4): 596–598. doi:10.1177/0019464612463811. ISSN 0019-4646.
- Roy, Parama (2014). "Possible Futures". Cultural Critique. 88: 214–221. doi:10.5749/culturalcritique.88.2014.0214. ISSN 0882-4371.
- De Souza, Arun (2012). Ghosh, Bishnupriya (ed.). "Global Icons in Popular Culture". Economic and Political Weekly. 47 (44): 28–29. ISSN 0012-9976.
