= Akhila Sivadas =

Indian development professional

- Born: Tamil Nadu, India
- Education: BA (Hons), MA in History, M.Phil in Modern Indian History
- Occupations: Development professional, researcher
- Years active: 1990s–present
- Known for: Executive Director of Centre for Advocacy and Research

Akhila Sivadas is an Indian development professional and researcher specialising in communication, gender and advocacy. She has worked on initiatives related to women's rights, reproductive health, and inclusion of marginalised communities. She is the executive director of Centre for Advocacy and Research, a Non Governmental Organisation.

== Early life and education ==
Sivadas is from Tamil Nadu and resides in New Delhi. She did her BA honours and postgraduate degree, both in history, at Miranda House, New Delhi which is affiliated with University of Delhi. Later, she completed her M.Phil in modern Indian history in 1972 at Jawaharlal Nehru University, Delhi.

== Career ==
Sivadas worked briefly, as a lecturer in Hyderabad in early nineties and later, joined the Women’s Feature Service. In January 1992, she founded the Media Advocacy Group, within WFS, as an initiative to strengthen gender and development perspectives in the media. In 1994, the National Commission for Women commissioned her to document and publish issues concerning women and the media in a single volume.

In 1998, Sivadas was awarded a MacArthur Foundation fellowship grant under its 'Population and Reproductive Health' vertical, a programme to promote the use of media for women's reproductive health initiatives in India, Mexico, and Nigeria. As part of the fellowship, she became a founding member of CFAR and has served as its executive director since its inception. The organisation works on issues of media advocacy, health and rights of marginalised communities.

Also in 1998, along with media critic Shailaja Bajpai, she conducted media monitoring programme for UNESCO. The study monitored popular programmes on major TV channels in India, and the duo wrote two documents which formed the basis of a Public Hearing in New Delhi. TV producers, TV channel executives, politicians, parents, teachers, psychiatrists and the public attended the hearing, and the findings were published as a book by UNESCO.

As a researcher, she specialises in communication and worked on gender and development, and its impact on communities. She also supported in bringing out publications on media advocacy and policy briefs on inclusivity of marginalised communities and reducing the stigma. After 2000, she campaigned against sex selection for about five years and from 2005, she started work in Rajasthan to stop sex selection. Under her, CFAR implemented the Avahan programme, the India AIDS Initiative of Bill and Melinda Gates Foundation as a media advocacy implementing partner in six high prevalent states.
