= Ennapadam Srinivas Krishnamoorthy =

Indian neuropsychiatrist

Ennapadam S. Krishnamoorthy
- Born: 3 December 1966 (age 59); Tamil Nadu, India
- Education: Mangalore University (MBBS); Manipal University (MAHE) (M.D); University College London (Ph.D)
- Known for: neurology, epilepsy, dementia, neuropsychiatry
- Awards: President's Medal, Royal College of Psychiatrists (2011); Fellow, Royal Colleges of Physicians: RCP Edinburgh (2007); RCPS Glasgow (2007); RCP London (2009)
- Scientific career
- Fields: Neurology; Psychiatry; Epidemiology
- Workplaces: Neurokrish

Ennapadam Srinivas Krishnamoorthy FRCPS(G)-P, FRCP, FRCPE (born 3 December 1966) is an Indian neuropsychiatrist with special interests in epilepsy and dementia. He is founder and director of Neurokrish the neuropsychiatry centre and TRIMED - chain of integrative medical specialties based in Chennai, India. He is Professor of Neuropsychiatry, Neurology and Clinical Neuroscience at The Institute of Neurological Sciences, Voluntary Health Services Multispeciality Hospital and Research Institute (TINS at VHS) affiliated to The Tamil Nadu Dr. M.G.R. Medical University. He is the founder of Buddhi Clinic - a chain of integrative health centers for the brain & mind in Chennai, India.

== Early life and education ==
Born in 1966 in Mumbai to an illustrious academic family, he grew up in Chennai with his paternal grandfather who was also named E.S. Krishnamoorthy. His grandfather was a decorated civil servant who served the British Indian and the Independent Indian Governments, as well as the United Nations, for over 5 decades between the 1930s and the 1970s. His father, Dr. Krishnamoorthy Srinivas (1933-2017) was renowned neurologist, who served at the VHS & Public Health Centre, West Mambalam, Chennai. His father was FRCP and was intensively trained in Canada. It was his father's inspiration which made Ennapadam Srinivas Krishnamoorthy specialise in neurology and related subjects.

He did his schooling St. Michael’s Academy in Chennai. In 1990, he joined the Kasturba Medical College in Mangalore, to study medicine and graduated with an MBBS. As a medical student he was involved in student politics & elections. he did compulsory rotating internship in JIPMER in Pondicherry where he was involve in a large government-run hospital that had a community clinic setting. He later joined Kasturba Medical College in Manipal to pursue a Doctor of Medicine in Psychiatry from 1992 to 1995. the latter period being on deputation to NIMHANS.

After graduating with the MD in psychiatry, Krishnamoorthy received the Paul Hamlyn Fellowship from the Paul Hamlyn Foundation, UK to pursue a postgraduate Diploma in Clinical Neurology at the Institute of Neurology - Queen Square, located within the University College in London and the Overseas Doctors Training Scheme in Behavioral Neurology and Neuropsychiatry.

In 1997, Krishnamoorthy was selected as the Raymond Way Lecturer in Behavioral Neurology and, Clinical Assistant in Neuropsychiatry to Professor Michael Trimble at the Raymond Way Neuropsychiatry Research Group, Institute of Neurology, University College London. Where he pursued a PhD in Medicine (Clinical Sciences) with University College London, with the subject of study being epilepsy and behavior in the community, project was involved collecting data from 270+ patients at the National Society for Epilepsy, Chalfont St. Peter, as well as research in NHS general practices at King’s Lynn and Bradford which had large lists of people with epilepsy.

== Work ==
E. S. Krishnamoorthyis was adjunct professor at the Public Health Foundation of India and Manipal University (MAHE) also an member of the Asian Society Against Dementia, and president of the International Neuropsychiatric Association

In 2001 Krishnamoorthy published in field of epilepsy neuropsychiatry with many scientific contributions, with membership of the International League Against Epilepsy - Psychobiology Commission chaired by Prof. Michael R. Trimble.

and later Prof. Bettina Schmitz.

In 2002, Dr. Krishnamoorthy joined Prof. Simon D Shorvon at the National Neuroscience Institute (NNI), Singapore as assistant director of research. Over the course of 18 months, he conducted a national epidemiological survey of neurological disorders in the elderly.

Krishnamoorthy was chaired the International League Against Epilepsy – Commission on Psychobiology; the World Health Organization- World Health Report 2012 (Dementia), Executive Committee Member of the International Neuropsychiatry Association (since 2004) and Asian Society Against Dementia (since 2005).

In 2002, Dr. Krishnamoorthy returned to India as the T.S. Srinivasan Chair in clinical neurosciences, in the Voluntary Health Services Medical Centre & Hospital (VHS). There, he joined K. Gopalakrishna Department of Neurology founded by Dr. K. Srinivas, where he developed projects and programs aimed at community care, education and research.

While working at the VHS, Dr. Krishnamoorthy set up the VHS Centre of Advanced Rehabilitation Services (CARES), a model interdisciplinary care program with 12 beds and a day care facility. to support rehabilitation for the underprivilege people, the project was recognised as a “center of excellence for dementia care” in the World Health Report.

== Awards and recognition ==
He is the recipient of the President's Medal of the Royal College of Psychiatrists for contributions to community neuropsychiatry. He was the first Indian psychiatrist to be elected fellow of all three United Kingdom Colleges of Physicians: Royal College of Physicians (London), Royal College of Physicians of Edinburgh, and the Royal College of Physicians and Surgeons of Glasgow.

== Publication ==
Krishnamoorthy is a regular contributor to The Hindu and numerous other medical, scientific and general publications. He has contributed more than 85 high-impact research articles and book chapters focusing upon epilepsy, dementia and neuropsychiatry.

He is the editor of The Global Approach series books published by Cambridge University Press. Together with Jeffrey L. Cummings and Martin James Prince he edited the first book in that series, Dementia: A global approach, (2011). Together with Simon D Shorvon, Steven C Schachter and Vivek Misra, he edited the second book, Epilepsy: A global approach (March 2017).

Books

- Krishnamoorthy, Ennapadam S.; Prince, Martin J.; Cummings, Jeffrey L. (7 October 2010). Dementia: A Global Approach. Cambridge University Press. ISBN 978-0-521-85776-5
- Epilepsy: A Global Approach
- Krishnamoorthy, Ennapadam S.; Shorvon, Simon D.; Schachter, Steven C. (6 April 2017). Epilepsy: A Global Approach. Cambridge University Press. ISBN 978-1-107-03537-9
- Beyond Feeling: Your Emotional Brain Intellectual Disability
- Krishnamoorthy, Ennapadam S .; (15 January 2019) Buddhi Book - The Brainstorms Edition Autism ASIN : B07MV1S3HY
