= Action for Global Health =

Action for Global Health was formed by 15 non-governmental organisations and charities in 2006. Current partners are based in Brussels, France, Germany, the Netherlands, Italy, Spain and the UK and has over 30 member NGOs across these countries. Interact Worldwide provides the overall co-ordination for the network.

== Objectives ==
The overarching goal of Action for Global Health is increased support from Europe to enable developing countries to make substantial progress towards the health Millennium Development Goals (MDGs) by 2015. Action for Global Health's members are monitoring the actions and policies of European governments for how they affect health in developing countries, influencing decision-makers to improve their practice and by inviting other NGOs and civil society organisations to join with the Action for Global Health to build a European campaign. The Action for Global Health wants to see our governments, the private sector and European institutions fulfill the promises they have made on reducing rates of infant and maternal mortality and slowing down the spread of transmissible diseases in the world's poorest countries. In particular, the Action for Global Health wants to see much greater support for the development and strengthening of health systems, through proper financing, retention of staff and ensuring equitable access.

Three Main Goals:

- Increased commitment and action from European governments – primarily the EU institutions, France, Germany, Netherlands, Italy, United Kingdom and Spain – to support the achievement of the Health MDGs in low and middle-income countries; including higher and better-focused financial contributions to health and health system strengthening.
- Increased capacity, engagement and effectiveness of European NGOs' advocacy in support of the Health MDGs, with improved policy analysis and networking with the NGO and development policy community (recognising the role of health as a key lever of development).
- Increased support from European civil society and the private sector for the achievement of the Health MDGs in low and middle-income countries, including a higher profile for global health in European media.

== Publications ==
In 2007, Action for Global Health partners published their first set of policy reports "Health Warning" in six different versions: Brussels, France, Germany, Italy, Spain and the UK:

- Brussels report - Health Warning (EU version)

Why Europe must act now to rescue the health Millennium Development Goals (MDGs). Action for Global Health is concerned that Europe is not yet doing enough to support developing countries achieve the health MDGs by 2015. The focus of this first report is on funding provided by European governments for health in developing countries through their Official Development Assistance (ODA).

- French report - Health Warning

Le sujet de ce rapport porte sur les financements de l'accès à la santé et aux soins de santé dans les pays en développement. Ce rapport montre que la faiblesse des budgets alloués à la santé par les gouvernements européens accentue les inégalités dans ce domaine entre pays développés pays en développement.

- German report - Health Warning

Im Mittelpunkt dieses ersten Berichts stehen die von den europäischen Regierungen durch ihre öffentliche Entwicklungshilfe (ODA) bereitgestellten Mittel für Gesundheit in den Entwicklungsländern.

- Italian Report - Allarme Salute

The Italian edition of the Action for Global Health report "Health Warning" was launched in Rome on 18 September. Allarme Salute presents a study about what Italian Government has been doing since 2000 on financing MDGs focusing on health and which are the most important issues to face in this field.

- Spanish Report - Health Warning

ALERTA DE SALUD: Por qué Europa debe actuar ya para cumplir los Objetivos de Desarrollo del Milenio en materia de salud. Acción por la Salud Global está preocupada porque Europa no está haciendo lo necesario para que los países en desarrollo cumplan los ODM de salud para 2015. El enfoque de este primer informe se centra en la financiación que los gobiernos europeos están destinando a través de la AOD a la salud para los países en desarrollo. Además, incluye un análisis específico sobre los compromisos de España con los ODM de salud.

- UK - Health Warning

Why Europe and the UK must act now to rescue the health MDGs. This version of the report includes a chapter on the UK's role in financing the health MDGs and calls on the UK Government to prioritise this area early in order to enable developing countries achieve the health MDGs by 2015.

== Funding ==
The network was initiated through a grant from the Bill & Melinda Gates Foundation as part of their support for global health advocacy. Similar networks on reproductive health, malaria and tuberculosis have been funded.

== Partners ==
When established in 2006 the grant from the Bill and Melinda Gates Foundation was administered by Action Aid as the European Network on Global Health.

At the first meeting of network staff funded by the grant, in Paris in February 2007, the partners established the name Action for Global Health and a three line tag line to outline its vision and purpose: Full Funding, Strong Systems, Fair Access.

At this time the partners were:

EU - Brussels: European Public Health Alliance, Marie-Stopes International, Stop Aids Alliance

France: Médecins du Monde, Global Health Advocates

Germany: Terre des hommes (Hilfe für kinder in Not), Welthungerhilfe

Italy: AIDOS, CESTAS

Spain: Medicos del mundo, Spanish Association of Family Planning

UK: International HIV AIDS Alliance, Interact, TB Alert,

After the first full period of funding from the BMGF for AFGH ended in 2011 it was renewed with Plan Interact administering the grant to the network in place of Action Aid.

The 15 partner organisations across six European countries are:

- Interact Worldwide (Network coordinator)
- Action Aid Italia
- The Catholic Organization for Relief and Development Aid (CORDAID)
- Stop AIDS Alliance
- Deutsche Stiftung Weltbevoelkerung (DSW)
- Terre des hommes
- Federación de Planificación Familiar Estatal
- Médicos del Mundo
- Global Health Advocates
- Oxfam Germany
- Plan International
- Associazione Italiana Donne per lo Sviluppo
- Stop Aids Now!
- International HIV/AIDS Alliance
- The European Parliamentary Forum on Population and Development (Network Partner)
