= Dharma Kumar =

Indian economic historian (1928-2001)

- Born: 1928
- Died: 2001 (aged 72–73)
- Education: Cambridge University
- Occupation: Historian
- Known for: Social history
- Notable credit(s): Author of Land and Caste in South India
- Spouse: Lovraj Kumar
- Children: Radha Kumar

Dharma Kumar (1928 – 19 October 2001) was an Indian economic historian, noted for her work on the agrarian history of India. Her Ph.D at Cambridge on the agrarian history of South India was awarded the Ellen MacArthur Prize, and was published as Land and Caste in South India (Cambridge University Press, 1965).

She is noted for the position that many of the social structures of agrarian India, particularly the large class of landless labourers pre-dated the British era. This challenged the earlier view that the class of agricultural labourers had been formed as a result of British exploitation in the nineteenth century

== Life ==
Born in a progressive Tamil Brahmin family, her father K. Venkataraman was one of India's leading chemists, and was the director of the National Chemical Laboratory. After a childhood in Lahore where her father was professor, Dharma Kumar did her bachelor's in Economics from Elphinstone College, Mumbai. She then went to Newnham College, Cambridge for her Master's in Economics.

Shortly after Indian independence, Dharma returned from Cambridge in 1948 and joined the Reserve Bank of India. In 1951, she married Lovraj Kumar, India's first Rhodes scholar. Lovraj was a graduate of chemistry from Oxford and was then working for Burmah-Shell in Mumbai. He would subsequently become a senior bureaucrat, serving as secretary in the Ministry of Petroleum for many years. They had one daughter, Radha Kumar.

After returning to India, she worked briefly as a consultant economist at the Indian Council for World Affairs and an economic historian at the University of Delhi's Institute for Economic Growth. In 1966, she joined the Delhi School of Economics. She was also one of the founding members of an academic journal, Indian Economic and Social History Review, which she edited for more than thirty years. The journal brought out a memorial volume in her honour in 2002, edited by Sanjay Subrahmanyam.

During the 1970s, she was also the co-editor, alongside Tapan Raychaudhuri, of the Cambridge Economic History of India.

She was also active in the arts and the literary life of Delhi, and might have been portrayed in Vikram Seth's A suitable boy as the character Professor Ila Chattopadhya. She was also associated with the magazine called Civil Lines.

Kumar retired from the DSE in 1993. She was diagnosed with a brain tumour in 1998, and underwent an unsuccessful operation, and died on 19 October 2001.

== Land and Caste ==
Land and Caste addresses the question of whether the large group of landless labourers (constituting as much as 25% of the agrarian working force) which existed in India during the mid-20th century were created before or during the period of colonial rule. In her works, she attempts to estimate the absolute and relative size of the landless agricultural workforce in Madras Presidency at the beginning of the 19th century, when a regular Census of India data did not exist.

Kumar's conclusion held that "it was not the case that a class of landless agricultural labourers was wholly created during the British period by the impoverishment of the peasant proprietor and the village craftsmen". This position is often misrepresented as stating that "the class of agricultural labourers was not affected by colonial rule". It explicitly critiqued of a number of "Golden Age descriptions" of the agrarian situation before colonial rule. The work, 210 pages long and written in a clear and spare style verging at times on dryness (though spiced with the periodic sarcastic remark in the footnote), established Kumar as an important alternative voice in a debate that was largely dominated at that point by Marxist and nationalist historians.

In her 30-page introduction to the 1992 reprint, Kumar reflects on a number of weaknesses in her own work: "its complete reliance on official records", the neglect of the process of "the conversion of tribals into untouchables and bonded labourers", an excessively strong association of caste and occupation. However, Kumar held that the "main conclusions of the work still held". These were as follows: "Members of certain castes were by and large agricultural labourers at the outset of British rule; this connection enables us to estimate the minimum strength of agricultural labourers then, and the estimate shows that the group was sizeable so that it cannot be held that landless labour was virtually created by British rule.
