= India HIV/AIDS Alliance =

Indian non-governmental organisation

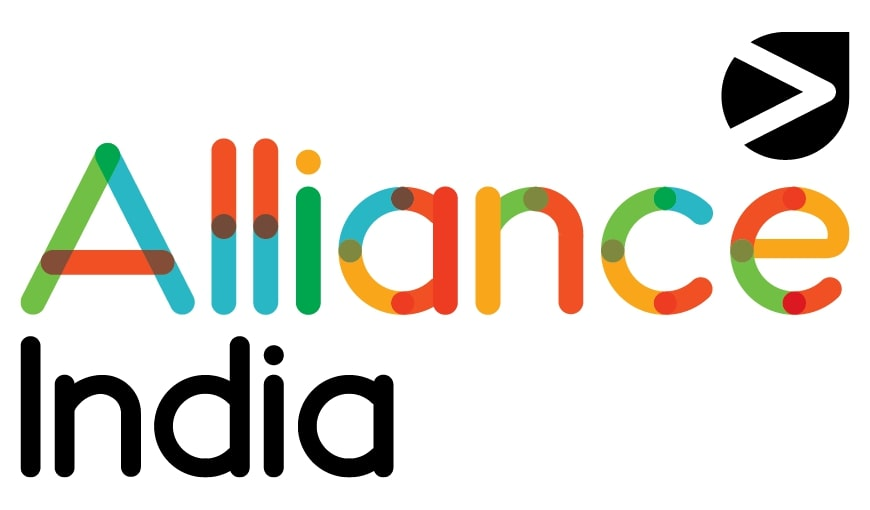
- Founded: 1999
- Purpose: HIV/AIDS, Key Populations
- Website: www.allianceindia.org

Founded in 1999, Alliance India is a non-governmental organisation operating in partnership with civil society, government and communities to support sustained responses to HIV in India that protect rights and improve health. Complementing the Indian national programme, they build capacity, provide technical support and advocate to strengthen the delivery of effective, innovative, community-based HIV programmes to vulnerable populations: sex workers, men who have sex with men (MSM), transgender people, hijras, people who inject drugs (PWID), and people living with HIV.

Alliance India's programmes foster wellbeing, realise equality, and affirm the dignity of communities most affected by HIV/AIDS.

Leveraging its implementation experience, it works closely with the Alliance Regional Technical Support Hub for South Asia to strengthen capacity of civil society organisations, government and the private sector in South Asia to respond more effectively to HIV/AIDS.

An independent national non-governmental organization (NGO) managed and governed wholly in India, Alliance India is also an accredited member of the global network of Linking Organisations of the International HIV/AIDS Alliance.

== Technical priorities ==
Alliance India works in the following technical areas of the HIV response in India:

- HIV Prevention
- Care and Support
- HIV and SRH
- Harm Reduction and Drug use

== Current programmes ==
Vihaan

Named for the Sanskrit word for 'dawn's first light,' Vihaan is a national initiative establishing and managing 350 Care & Support Centres (CSCs) across India to expand access to essential services, increase treatment adherence, reduce stigma and discrimination, and improve the quality of life of people living with HIV (PLHIV). The programme is designed as the care & support component of the country's HIV response under National AIDS Control Programme IV (NACP IV). Working in collaboration with the Department of AIDS Control and with support from the Global Fund, the programme operates in 31 states and territories and will reach more than one million PLHIV by 2016. The Vihaan consortium is led by Alliance India and 17 state-level PLHIV networks and NGOs that in turn partner with district-level PLHIV networks and other organisations to deliver care & support services in communities. Vihaan provides access to a range of quality care & support services using an integrated approach that complements existing HIV prevention and treatment programming. Working in coordination with nearby ART Centres, CSCs serve as safe spaces for PLHIV offering services that include counselling, outreach and follow-up support, health referrals, and linkages to social welfare schemes.

Samarth

In implementation since 2016 with support from Elton John AIDS Foundation, Samarth, (meaning competent) project provides community-led HIV screening and treatment linkages for men who have sex with men (MSM) and transgender and hijra (TGH) population by ensuring confidential and sensitive dealing of various sexual health-related issues. Samarth community clinics are implemented through a consortium of five partners, Lakshya Trust, Sangama Trust, Amitie Trust, Udaan Trust and Shaan Foundation in seven cities: Noida (Delhi NCR), Jalandhar (Punjab), Vadodara (Gujarat), Hyderabad (Telangana), Hooghly (West Bengal), Hassan (Karnataka) and Pune (Maharashtra).

Samarth is the first community-based testing intervention implemented in India with the support of the National AIDS Control Organisation (NACO) for MSM and TGH population. The project works closely with NACO & State AIDS Control Societies. The project has helped the national programme to gather higher reactivity among MSM & TGH person, reach out to the new population, not yet served under targeted interventions, for prevention services and to increase health-seeking behaviour among them.

Sampoorna

Sampoorna (meaning 'Holistic' or “Complete” in Hindi) Project is implemented in nine priority districts of Gujarat (Ahmedabad, Surat, Sabarkatha, Banaskatha, Vadodara, Chota Udaipur, Aravali, Kheda and Anand) focusing on creating viable ecosystems to strengthen HIV–SRH at service delivery and community level. Supported by the United Nations Population Fund (UNFPA), the project was rolled out in April 2020 for the project cycle 2020–2022. In the wake of COVID-19 outbreak, the project has included COVID-19 response to address the access gaps in ART medications and reproductive health products along with mental health counselling for PLHIV and high-risk groups. The field staff include outreach workers of Care and Support Centres (CSCs), Targeted Interventions (TIs), Link Workers Scheme (LWS), frontline workers of National Health Mission – ASHA and ANM.

A number of studies have generated evidence indicating that SRH and HIV issues are intertwined. However, both these programmes work in parallel without concrete collaborations. While we are aiming towards ambitious targets of SDGs to be achieved till 2030, we need to bridge the gaps between SRH & HIV and work towards integrated training, service provision and counselling for holistic (Sampoorna) health response to our communities. This will improve access to information and risk perception, improve continuity of care, and reduce the cost of services and would also lead to improved client-health worker relationships. Moreover, SRH needs of the key population – women in sex work (WISW) and transgender (TGs) seeking reproductive and sexual services are not met due to lack of enabling environment and specific services for them.

The project will demonstrate stronger and sustainable SRH-HIV integration at medical colleges, 70 CHCs & PHCs and also at the state level. Larger advocacy framework of this programme will work towards mainstreaming issues related to stigma and discrimination, gender-based violence and community system strengthening. The key strategies will involve; evidence-based advocacy with State AIDS Control organization and NHM, capacity building of medical and paramedical staff with an integrated module on SRH-HIV and capacity building of frontline NHM health workers as well as HIV TI NGOs on delivery of integrated services. The project will also identify and empower community champions for the sustainability of the project. Furthermore, the district mentors will supervise and facilitate the continuation of essential SRH-HIV services among women, adolescents, key populations and PLHIV.

Hridaya

Named for the Hindi word for 'heart,' the Hridaya programme expands harm reduction services for people who inject drugs (PWID), their partners and families and fosters an enabling environment by protecting and promoting their rights. The programme leverages the existing government investment in HIV prevention for PWID and builds NGO capacity to expand services to include a full range of harm reduction interventions. Hridaya is funded by the Government of Netherlands and is part of the five-country Community Action on Harm Reduction initiative. The programme in India complements and supplements the services of Targeted Interventions (TIs) in selected states. TIs are at the centre of the HIV prevention approach for PWID adopted by the Department of AIDS Control and implemented by State AIDS Control Societies (SACS) around the country. Hridaya works in partnership with 34 organisations to augment existing capacity and fill implementation gaps in harm reduction in the states of Bihar, Haryana, Uttarakhand, Jammu, and Manipur. By the end of 2014, the programme will reach more than 50,000 beneficiaries, including more than 10,000 PWID.

== Past programmes ==
HRAsia (Harm Reduction Advocacy in Asia grant)

People who inject drugs in Asia are disproportionately affected by HIV, despite the region seeing an overall decline in HIV rates. In 2018, UNAIDS reported HIV prevalence among people who inject drugs in Southeast Asia to be highest in the Philippines (29%), Indonesia (28.76%), and Thailand (19.02%). Access to combination prevention services, especially Harm Reduction, remains a challenge in a few countries according to survey data from 2016 to 2018.

The Global Fund's Harm Reduction Advocacy in Asia grant (HRAsia) is based on learning from the earlier national programme. Since 2017, the regional grant focuses on advocacy to achieve the long-term sustainability of harm reduction interventions in line with the 90-90-90 targets in seven high priority countries of Asia through our country partners in Cambodia, India, Indonesia, Nepal, Philippines, Thailand and Vietnam. Our technical partners under the regional grant are the International Drug Policy Consortium, a global network of 182 NGOs, Asian Network of People who Use Drugs, the regional community-led organization and Harm Reduction International, a leading NGO dedicated to reducing the negative health, social and legal impacts of drug use and drug policy.

WINGS

Alliance India piloted WINGS, an intervention model for addressing gender-based violence (GBV) and intimate partner violence (IPV) against women using drugs (WUDs), in 2017 with support from Frontline AIDS. As a successful model, Alliance India is currently implementing the third phase of WINGS intervention from June to December 2019 in partnership with Sahara Aalhad in Pune, Ganga Social Foundation in Delhi and Nirvana Foundation in Manipur.

WINGS is an evidence-based screening, brief intervention and referral to treatment service tool designed to identify the intimate partner violence and gender-based violence for women who use drugs. The intervention enables participating women to develop safety planning strategies and strengthen their social support networks. WINGS can be delivered in one to two sessions and has been integrated with HIV counselling and testing and linkage to HIV treatment interventions.

LINKAGES

Building on the years of experience of closely working with HRG communities on HIV prevention, treatment and care, Alliance India directly implemented LINKAGES project supported by FHI 360 funded by USAIDS PEPFAR in six high burden districts of Maharashtra (Mumbai, Pune and Thane) and Andhra Pradesh (Krishna, Guntur and East Godavari) starting from August 2017. For the first time, an HIV programme was designed to provide HIV services to the scattered MSM and TG population in remote sub-districts of rural districts.

As an attempt to reduce structural barriers, the Linkages project collaborated with 16 community-based organisations and 77 targeted interventions of State AIDS Control Organisations. The staff serving female sex workers and MSM and TGs were trained on gender-based violence and violence mitigation, laws and policies that can harm or help the community and supported in advocacy activities with the stakeholders. On the other hand, had a series of sensitization meetings and training with health care providers which lead to increased service uptake. To ensure that communities continue to serve beyond the project period, efforts were put in strengthening the institution and organisational development for community-based organisations in the two states.

Chanura Kol

Often neglected, women who inject drugs are a highly marginalised and vulnerable population in need of a comprehensive response to meet their health and social needs. With support from the Elton John AIDS Foundation, Alliance India partnered with Social Awareness Social Organisation to mitigate the impact of drug use and HIV on these women through the Chanura Kol project – named with the Manipuri words for 'garden of women.' Through a holistic, community-based model, Chanura Kol met immediate health, protection and psychosocial needs of women who inject drugs. In addition the project enhanced access to harm reduction services, supported economic rehabilitation and social integration, and reduced stigma and discrimination related to both injecting drug use and HIV. Drop-in centres and a short-stay home were established to provide harm reduction services, HIV prevention interventions, care & support programming, and counselling. Support groups were also formed in each district, providing outreach and referrals to sexual & reproductive health (SRH), antiretroviral therapy (ART), ICTC, general health and other social services. Referrals were also provided for drug treatment and oral substitution therapy (OST). Once women completed treatment or stabilised on OST, they could access the short-stay home for six months; the home provided shelter, food, health services, psychosocial and family reintegration support, and vocational training.

Avahan

Avahan India AIDS Initiative was a focused prevention initiative funded by the Bill & Melinda Gates Foundation that worked in six states of India to reduce HIV transmission and lower the prevalence of sexually transmitted infections in vulnerable high-risk populations – female sex workers (FSWs), men who have sex with men (MSM), transgender people, people who inject drugs (PWID) – through prevention education and services. Alliance India was designated a state lead partner for Avahan in Andhra Pradesh (AP). The programme's main components included condom promotion, STI management, behaviour change communication, community mobilisation, and advocacy. Avahan also supported the creation of an enabling environment through individual and organisational capacity building to increase the effectiveness and impact of the HIV response. Alliance India's efforts in Andhra Pradesh strengthened the capacity of non-governmental organisations (NGOs) and community-based organisation (CBOs) to implement quality HIV and STI programming in close partnership with the AP State AIDS Control Society (APSACS) and in alignment with the National AIDS Control Programme IV (NACP IV). Reaching more than 85,000 FSWs, MSM and transgender people, the programme contributed significantly to HIV prevention among high-risk population in Andhra Pradesh. Health-seeking behaviour in these groups increased from 5% to 70% in the first five years of the programme. Condom distribution increased from 6.5 million to 102 million in six years. An estimated 10,000 HIV infections were averted among target populations in the 13 intervention districts in the Telangana and Rayalseema regions, and more than 450,000 people were reached through prevention campaigns and public events.

Koshish

Named for the Hindi word for 'effort,' the Koshish programme supported advocacy and action to improve sexual & reproductive health (SRH) of people living with HIV (PLHIV) and key populations in India. Funded by the European Union, the programme strengthened civil society organisations and networks that represent and work with PLHIV and other marginalised groups, such as female sex workers (FSWs), men who have sex with men (MSM), transgender people, hijras and people who inject drugs (PWID). Through coalitions, Koshish partner organisations worked at state and district levels, affirming principles of empowerment and meaningful partnership as core elements of effective advocacy. The programme was successful in advancing community-led advocacy initiatives that raised awareness of SRH challenges faced by PLHIV. Community priorities were then taken up by state-level advocacy coalitions established by Koshish and composed of civil society organisations, PLHIV networks, community-based organisations working for and led by key populations, and media. Koshish successfully advocated for appropriate interventions to address critical challenges facing PLHIV, including social stigma and discrimination, limited accessibility to and availability of essential SRH services, and lack of a comprehensive approach to the SRH needs of PLHIV, particularly of women living with HIV (WLHIV). For instance, the programme increased access for WLHIV in the four programme states to Pap smear testing. WLHIV are five-times more susceptible to cervical cancer than other women. Alliance India implemented Koshish in partnership with CHETNA, MAMTA, PWDS and VMM, along with state-level PLHIV networks in Andhra Pradesh, Gujarat, Maharashtra and Tamil Nadu.

Abhaya

Female sex workers (FSWs) have considerable unmet sexual & reproductive health (SRH) needs due to their occupations and social marginalization. They are discouraged from accessing SRH services due to stigma and discrimination, negative attitudes of healthcare providers, and fear of clients, law enforcement, and people opposed to sex work. Evidence, both global and national, has shown that linking HIV and SRH services provide a valuable impetus to encourage uptake of prevention, treatment, and care and support services, especially by people living with HIV (PLHIV) and key populations, including FSWs. With this approach in mind, Alliance India with funding support from MAC AIDS Fund has initiated a pilot programme Abhaya – meaning 'fearless woman' in Hindi – for FSWs in Andhra Pradesh and Gujarat. Abhaya expands access to complementary SRH services, including basic information, counselling, referrals and linkages to facilities providing required services. In addition, Abhaya builds the capacity of healthcare providers to address the specific needs of FSWs. Abhaya also engages in advocacy with the government to identify opportunities to adapt and scale up expanded access to SRH services for FSWs. Abhaya gives a significant role to FSWs in the implementation of the programme at all stages to increase ownership and the potential for sustainability of the initiative. Over the first two pilot years, the programme will reach 4,500 FSWs and their partners, helping them better identify their SRH needs and access quality services thus empowering them to protect their overall health and well-being.

Pehchan

Named for the Hindi word meaning 'identity,' 'recognition' or 'acknowledgement,' the Pehchan programme strengthens and builds the capacity of 200 community-based organisations (CBOs) to provide effective, inclusive and sustainable HIV prevention programming in 17 states in India for more than 450,000 men who have sex with men (MSM), transgender people and hijras (collectively, MTH). Pehchan is funded by the Global Fund and remains their largest single-country grant to date focused on the HIV response for vulnerable and underserved sexual minorities. Along with Alliance India, the Pehchan consortium includes the Humsafar Trust, Pehchan North Region Office, SAATHII, Sangama, Alliance India Andhra Pradesh, and SIAAP. Pehchan is a rare example of a Community Systems Strengthening programme working at a national scale. It provides organisational development, technical and capacity building support to new and existing CBOs working with MTH communities. Using a rights-based approach, the programme develops CBOs to serve as implementing partners with the National AIDS Control Programme's Targeted Interventions (TIs) that provide HIV prevention services to high-risk groups. By helping build strong CBOs, Pehchan addresses capacity gaps that often prevent them from receiving government funding. Pehchan also enhances the scope of services to reflect the needs of the community. The programme leverages and complements the government's HIV prevention strategy for MTH by providing services beyond basic HIV prevention that support an enabling environment that encourages healthy behaviours. Pehchan also fosters community-friendly services in the broader health system and engages in advocacy to improve the lives and wellbeing of MTH populations in India.

=== Action Project ===
In a region where taboos prevent open discussions about sex, the Action Project opened up spaces for such conversations among young people in India and Bangladesh. Funded by the European Union, the project supported community mobilisation and advocacy to improve sexual & reproductive health (SRH) of young people. Using a right-based approach, the project focused particularly on the most marginalised young people – men who have sex with men (MSM), transgender people, people who inject drugs (PWID), female sex workers (FSWs), and people living with HIV (PLHIV). Peer-led discussions strengthened and empowered civil society organisations and youth groups to advocate for more responsive policies addressing the SRH of young people. The Action Project was implemented in India by Alliance India in the states of Manipur and Uttar Pradesh in partnership with SASO and MAMTA and in Bangladesh by HASAB. One of the key strategies employed by the project was the development of Youth Partnership Platforms (YPPs) to link youth group networks together at various levels to advocate for the inclusion of young people and their issues in national and state-level SRH policy and programme development. In addition, the establishment of Youth Information Centres at village level increased SRH and HIV knowledge among participating youth and expanded their capacity to share this information with their peers and in the wider community.

=== CHAHA ===
Named for the Hindi word for 'wish,' CHAHA was India's first large-scale care & support programme for children, families and communities affected by HIV/AIDS. With support from the Global Fund, the programme was implemented in four states – Andhra Pradesh, Maharashtra, Manipur, and Tamil Nadu – by Alliance India in collaboration with LEPRA, MAMTA, PWDS, SASO, VMM, NMP+, Plan India, TASOSS, and 54 community partner organisations. CHAHA was a child-centered, community-based care and support programme aimed at reducing HIV-related morbidity and mortality among children and adults by increasing social protection and enabling stigma-free access to services. Over the life of the programme, CHAHA reached 64,056 children and their families in 41,974 households affected by HIV. In its initial design, the programme focused on providing direct services. Based on lessons learnt through implementation, CHAHA revised its approach to focus on linking beneficiaries with existing government-funded social welfare schemes.

== Campaigns ==
=== 207 against 377 ===
Section 377 of the Indian Penal Code (IPC) criminalizes sexual activities "against the order of nature", including all homosexual acts. Initiated by the Pehchan programme, the '207 against 377' campaign protests the December 2013 Supreme Court judgment that upheld Section 377 of the Indian Penal Code, overturning a 2009 Delhi High Court judgment and thus re-criminalizing homosexuality. The decision contemptuously referred to sexual minorities as a "miniscule [sic] minority" whose rights are "so-called." The ruling has made members of India's lesbian, gay, bisexual and transgender (LGBT) communities even more vulnerable to violations of their basic human rights, including discrimination, harassment and violence. Almost immediately, the Pehchan partners saw an impact on its work with men who have sex with men (MSM), transgender people and hijras, as fewer community members sought services as a consequence of the judgment. '207 against 377' brings together the 207 organisations implementing Pehchan on a common platform to undertake advocacy against the judgment at district, state and national levels. The campaign reaches out to various stakeholders including political parties, religious leaders, media, police and educational institutions to increase their understanding of the challenges facing LGBT communities. The initiative raises awareness to influence the ongoing legal process to ensure rights, protection and dignity for all LGBT Indians.

=== End AIDS India ===
End AIDS India is a campaign by Alliance India to create awareness on HIV and mobilise resources to fund HIV response programme in India to accelerate the response to the HIV epidemic in India.

== Donors ==
Since 1999, the India HIV/AIDS Alliance has received support from:

- Bill & Melinda Gates Foundation
- Commonwealth Foundation
- Elton John AIDS Foundation
- European Union
- Global Fund to Fight AIDS, Tuberculosis and Malaria
- Hewlett Foundation
- International HIV/AIDS Alliance
- Government of the Netherlands
- The Abbott Fund
- US President's Emergency Plan for AIDS Relief (PEPFAR)
- UK Department for International Development (DFID)
- UNAIDS
- United States Agency for International Development (USAID)
- United Nations Development Programme
- World Health Organization

== Alliance Regional Technical Support Hub (South Asia) ==
In 2008, the Alliance Regional Technical Support Hub for South Asia was established by Alliance India with support from the International HIV/AIDS Alliance (UK) to build the capacity of civil society organizations, government and the private sector in the region to respond more effectively and efficiently to HIV/AIDS. The Hub primarily serves the nine countries in South Asia: Afghanistan, Bangladesh, Bhutan, India, Maldives, Myanmar, Nepal, Pakistan, and Sri Lanka. In 2011, the South Asia Hub was incorporated as an independent, non-profit company in India.

== Awards and recognitions ==
India HIV/AIDS Alliance has been selected as one of three finalists for the India NGO Awards 2011 in the Large Organisation category. This award is a joint venture of the Resource Alliance and the Rockefeller Foundation. It recognizes organisations that have demonstrated best practices in creative resourcing, financial management, governance and impact in the community.

India HIV/AIDS Alliance also organises Leadership awards at the world AIDS day. The award ceremony has two sections. The first section is respecting the existing leaders who have made immense contribution to the community and the sector. And the second section is giving awards to new and emerging leaders. The first Leadership awards were organised in 2016.

Winners of first leadership awards were:

- Ravi Kiran (Category - LGBT Community)
- Nandini Thapa and Ketholelie Angam (Category - PWID Community)
- Kusum (Category - Sex workers community)
- Meera Parida (Category - Transgender community)
- Bina Gari (Category - PLHIV Community)
- Harsh Agarwal (Category - Youth)

The second was held at connaught place in 2017.
