= Frontline AIDS =

International partnership of organizations

- Logo of Frontline AIDS
- Predecessor: International Alliance Supporting Community Action on AIDS
- Formation: November 1993; 33 years ago
- Type: IGO, INGO
- Purpose: Supporting community action on HIV, health and rights to end AIDS
- Location(s): 1st and 2nd Floor, Preece House, 91-101 Davigdor Road, Hove BN3 1RE, United Kingdom
- Coordinates: 50.8317°N 0.1574°W
- Region served: Worldwide
- Affiliations: UNAIDS
- Website: frontlineaids.org

Frontline AIDS (formerly known as the International HIV/AIDS Alliance (IHAA) until 2019) is a global partnership of nationally based governmental and non-governmental organizations which support community organizations which promote HIV/AIDS issues in developing countries. The Alliance was created in November 1993 as the International Alliance Supporting Community Action on AIDS, and later renamed the International HIV/AIDS Alliance. In 2019, they rebranded themselves as Frontline AIDS. The alliance's founding executive director, Jeffrey O'Malley, served from 1993 to 2003. From 2003 until 2015, the alliance was led by Alvaro Bermejo, who was succeeded by Christine Stegling.

== See also ==
- Action for Global Health
- India HIV/AIDS Alliance
- List of non-governmental organizations in China
- Seth Berkley
- Source (International Information Support Centre)
- Starfish Greathearts Foundation
