= Baker–Venkataraman rearrangement =

Chemical reaction discovered by and named after W. Baker and K. Venkataraman

The Baker–Venkataraman rearrangement is the chemical reaction of 2-acetoxyacetophenones with base to form 1,3-diketones.

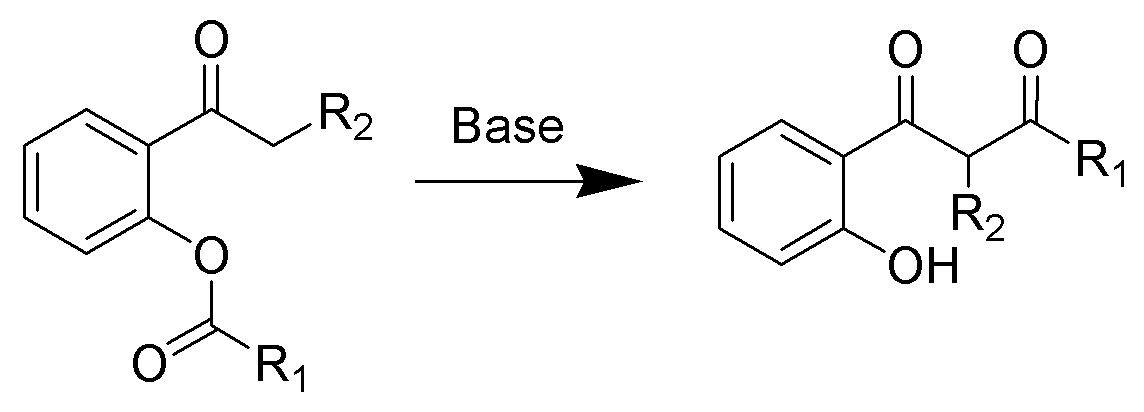
The Baker-Venkataraman rearrangement

This rearrangement reaction proceeds via enolate formation followed by acyl transfer. It is named after the scientists Wilson Baker and K. Venkataraman.

The Baker–Venkataraman rearrangement is often used in the synthesis of chromones and flavones. After the base-catalyzed rearrangement, treatment with acid generally affords the chromone or flavone core, though other milder methods have been reported.

== Mechanism ==
A base abstracts the hydrogen atom alpha to the aromatic ketone, forming an enolate. Then, the enolate attacks the ester carbonyl to form a cyclic alkoxide. The cyclic intermediate is opened up to form a more stable phenolate, which is protonated during acidic work-up to give the desired product.

The Baker-Venkataraman rearrangement mechanism

To complete the construction of the chromone or flavone core, cyclodehydration is required. This was commonly afforded by treatment with strong acid, however many milder conditions have now been developed. One proposed mechanism for this dehydration is as follows:

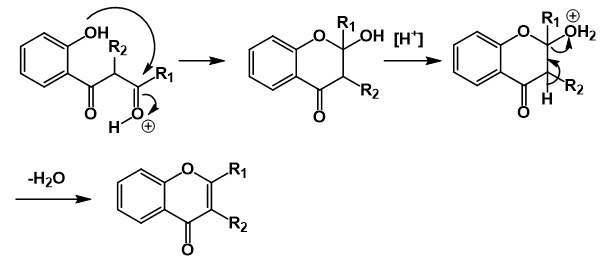
The cyclodehydration following the Baker-Venkataraman rearrangment on treatment with acid.

== See also ==
- Allan–Robinson reaction
- Kostanecki acylation
