= Madhav Sharma =

Indian-British actor (born 1940)

- Born: 12 November 1940 (age 85); Kolkata, India
- Education: Scottish Church College; RADA
- Years active: 1964–present
- Spouse: Jenny Seagrove (m. 1984; div. 1988)
- Relatives: K. Venkataraman (uncle); K. S. Sanjivi (uncle); K. Swaminathan (uncle)

Madhav Sharma (born 12 November 1939) is an Indian-British actor. He trained at the Royal Academy of Dramatic Art in London and first came to public attention playing a prisoner named Patel in the BBC sci-fi series Doctor Who in 1973. Since then he has appeared in a number of plays and films over the years.

== Early life ==
Sharma studied at the Scottish Church College in Kolkata, India and later at the Royal Academy of Dramatic Art in Bloomsbury, London.

Following the death of his mother, Sharma was raised in Bangalore by his grandfather and aunt, who was an independence activist and social activist on behalf of Dalit children. His uncles, K. Venkataraman, K. S. Sanjivi and K. Swaminathan, all have been conferred the Padma Awards of India in various fields.

== Career ==
After graduating from RADA, Sharma decided to pursue a career in theatre and changed his stage surname to Sharma.

He played the role of Patel, a lunar penal colony prisoner in the third episode of the 1973 Doctor Who story Frontier in Space, Patel was a member of the Peace Party and had been arrested for sabotaging a military base.

He played Siddique in the 2002 theatrical production Calcutta Kosher.

He would next enact the role of Sir Toby Belch in Twelfth Night, in the West End.

He voiced the character, Vikram, in the 2012 survival horror game ZombiU.

He played the part of Prem Mandal in Coronation Street. He later joined EastEnders, with his role Arshad Ahmed commencing on 1 January 2018. He departed the show on 1 November 2019.

He appeared as Suresh Dhanar, in an episode called "Who Wants to be Told Bad News" from the seventies TV series Public-Eye.

== Personal life ==
Sharma was formerly married to the British actress Jenny Seagrove.

== Filmography ==
=== Film ===
Studio	Film	Role	Directors/Producers
Samuelson Films	The Gathering by Anthony Horovitz	Dr. Byworth	Dir: Brian Gilbert/Prods: Pippa Cross/ Marc Samuelson/Peter Samuelson
20th Century Fox/Regency Enterprises	Entrapment by Ronal Bass/ Michael Hertzberg/William Broyles	Security Chief	Dir: Jon Amiel/Prods: Sean Connery/ Arnon Milchan/Michael Hertzberg/ Rhonda Tellefson
United Productions/PBS Masterpiece Theatre	Innocents by Neil McKay	Janardan Dhasmana	Dir: Peter Kosminsky/Prods: Helga Dowie/ Tim Vaughan
Carnaby Films	Spivs by Gary Young/ Mike Loveday/Colin Teague	Mr. Singh	Dir: Colin Teague/Prod: Hamish Skeggs
Assassin Films/BBC/Film Four	EAST IS EAST by Ayub Khan Din	Mr. Shah	Dir: Damian O’Donnell/Prod: Leslee Udwin
Tiger Aspect Ptctures/Shona Prodns. Etc.	dog eat dog by Mark Tonderai	Mr. Shukla	Dir: Moody Shoaibi/Prod: Amanda Davis
Amy International/Film Works	Such A Long Journey by Rohinton Mistry/ Sooni Tarporevala	Peerbhoy/Paanwallah	Dir: Sturla Gunnarsson/Prods: Simon MacCorkindale/Paul Stephens
Larkspur Films/Channel 4 Films	Shadey by Snoo Wilson	Orator	Dir: Philip Saville/Prod: Otto Plaschkes
Monkey in Heaven Films	The Blue Tower by Smita Bhide	Naresh	Dir: Smita Bhide/Prod: Jamie Nuttgens
Samuel Goldwyn	Wild West by Harwant Bains	Ugly Abdul	Dir: David Attwood Prod: Eric Fellner
EMI Films/Orion Pictures	The Awakening by Chris Bryant/ Clive Exton/ Allan Scott/ Bram Stoker	Doctor	Dir: Mike Newell/Prod: Robert H Solo
Anglo-EMI/Associated London Films	Up The Front by Sid Colin/Eddie Braben	Indian Officer	Dir: Bob Kellett/Prods: Ned Sherrin/ Terry Glinwood/Beryl Vertue
Bend It Films/Indian Film Co.	It’s A Wonderful Afterlife by Paul Mayeda Berges/Gurinder Chadha	Dev's Dad	Dir: Gurinder Chadha/Prods: Paul Mayeda/ Michelle Fox/Chris Curling
Skywalk Pictures	The Euphoric Scale	Doctor	Dir: David Skynner/Prod: Jane Walker
	Ride the Snake †	Pal Singh	Dir: Shani Grewal/Prod: Amar Singh
