= Kostanecki acylation =

The Kostanecki acylation is a method used in organic synthesis to form chromones or coumarins by acylation of O-hydroxyaryl ketones with aliphatic acid anhydrides, followed by cyclization. If benzoic anhydride (or benzoyl chloride) is used, a particular type of chromone called a flavone is obtained. It was named after Polish chemist Stanisław Kostanecki.

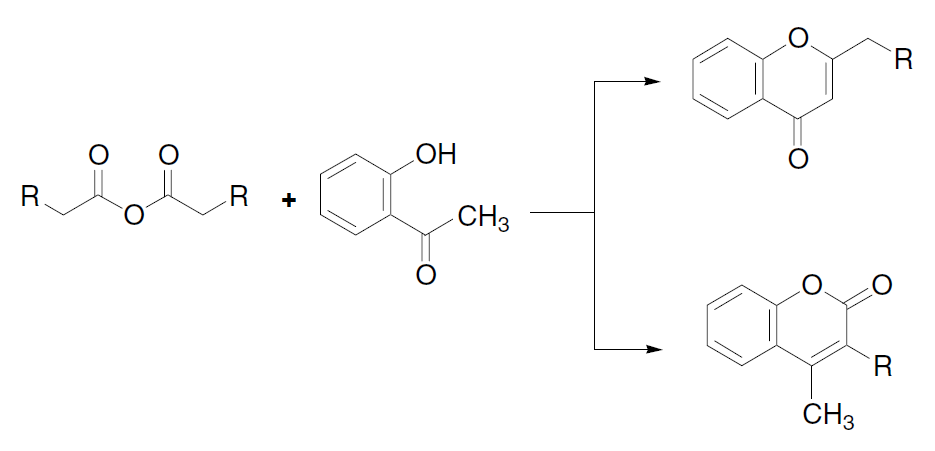

== Mechanism ==
The mechanism consists of three well-differentiated reactions:

1. Phenol O-acylation with formation of a tetrahedral intermediate
2. Intramolecular aldol condensation to cyclize and to form a hydroxydihydrochromone
3. Elimination of the hydroxyl group to form the chromone (or coumarin)

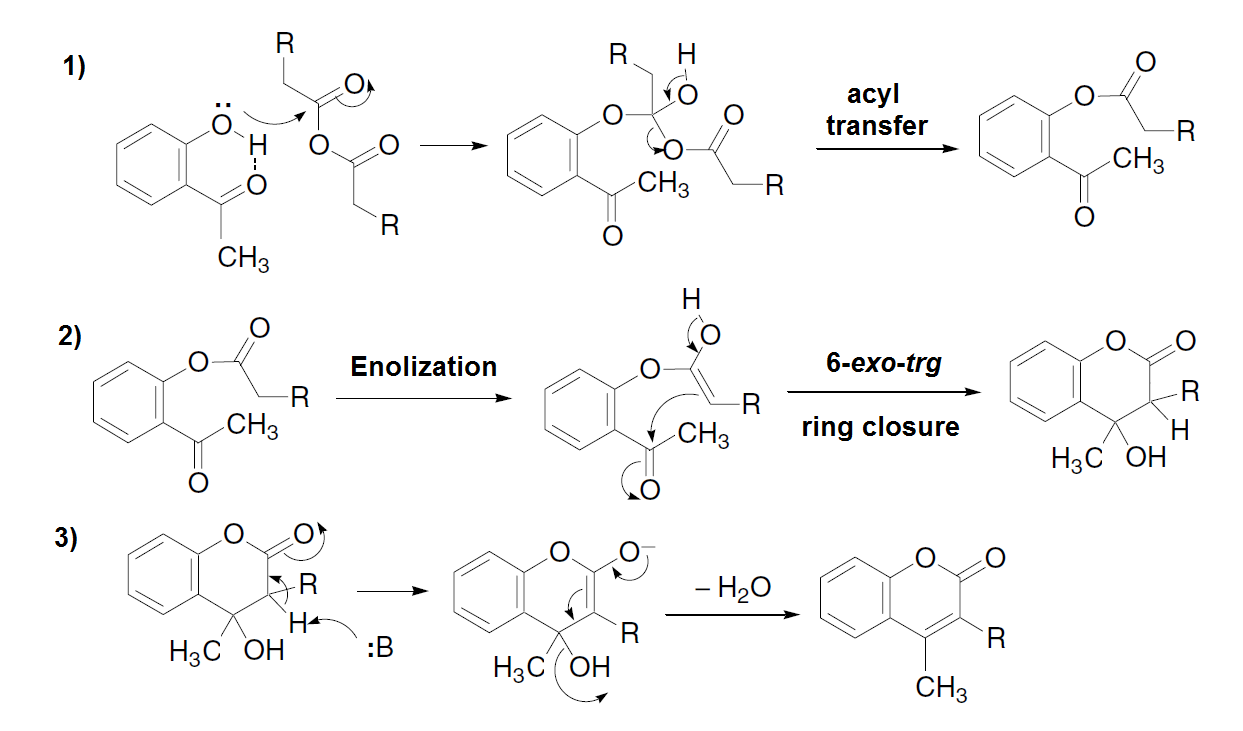

== Examples ==
- Alvocidib (flavopiridol)
- Dimefline
- Flavoxate

== See also ==
- Allan–Robinson reaction
- Baker–Venkataraman rearrangement
