= Krishnaswami Srinivas Sanjivi =

Indian medical doctor and social worker (1903–1994)

Prof Krishnaswami Srinivas Sanjivi
- Born: Krishnaswami Srinivas Sanjivi; 27 December 1903; Pudukkottai, British India
- Died: 1 October 1994 (aged 90); Voluntary Health Services hospital, Chennai
- Citizenship: Indian
- Education: MBBS in 1927, MD General Medicine in 1930. (one of the first four to do so!), In 1947, Study about Chest Disease at Brompton Hospital-London
- Alma mater: Madras Medical College
- Occupations: Physician, Father of Primary Healthcare in India
- Employer(s): 1948 he was the Director of the Tuberculosis Research Centre-Chetput and Director of the Tuberculosis Sanatorium-Tambaram at same time. Then He served as the Professor of Medicine at the Madras Medical College and the Stanley Medical College as well as the first physician of the Government General Hospital, Madras.
- Known for: Social service
- Notable work: The Father of Primary Healthcare in India
- Title: The Father of Primary Healthcare in India
- Spouse: Mrs. Alamelu (Pappu)
- Parent(s): Father - Krishnaswami, Mother - Dharmasamvardhini
- Relatives: Krishnasami Venkataraman (brother); K. Swaminathan (brother); Madhav Sharma (nephew)
- Awards: awarded the Padma Shri in 1971, Padma Bhushan in 1976 and Dr B C Roy National Award for Socio Medical Relief in 1976.

Krishnaswami Srinivas Sanjivi (1903–1994) was an Indian medical doctor, Gandhian, social worker and the founder of Voluntary Health Services (VHS), a medical facility in Chennai reported to be serving the lower and middle-class people of the society. He was honoured by the Government of India in 1971 with Padma Shri, the fourth highest Indian civilian award. Five years later, the government followed it up by awarding him the third highest civilian award of Padma Bhushan in 1976.

== Biography ==
K. S. Sanjivi was born in 1903 at Pudukkottai in the south Indian state of Tamil Nadu to Dharmambal and P. S. Krishnaswami Iyer, the self-appointed guardian of Muthulakshmi Reddi, a renowned Indian physician and the first woman legislator in India, during her college days. He was the youngest of their four children, the eldest a daughter, Veda and his elder brothers, Krishnaswami Swaminathan, noted journalist and the chief editor of The Collected Works of Mahatma Gandhi and Krishnaswami Venkataraman, former director of the National Chemical Laboratory; both would go on to win Padma Bhushan awards. Actor Madhav Sharma is his nephew.

He did his schooling at P. S. Senior Secondary School and graduated from the Presidency College, Madras after which he joined Madras Medical College from where he graduated in medicine (MBBS) in 1927. He secured a master's degree (MD) in general medicine from the same institution in 1932 and joined government service.

Sanjivi served many places in the erstwhile Madras state like Madanapalle, Madurai and Madras city and held several senior positions in the state government service including the post of the Director of Tuberculosis in the Madras Medical Service, Professor of medicine at Stanley Medical College and Madras Medical College and also served as the first physician at the Government General Hospital, Chennai. When his legitimate claim to the post of the Director of Medical Services was ignored, he voluntarily retired from government service and founded the Voluntary Health Services (VHS) in 1958 as a non profit making non governmental organization to extend cost effective medical services to the poor and middle class sections of the society. Declining the offer of the post of a professor of medicine at the All India Institute of Medical Sciences, New Delhi and choosing not to resort to private practice, he engaged himself fully into the work associated with VHS.

Gathering assistance from his students and some of the notable personalities of like Kasturi Srinivasan, T. R. Venkatarama Sastri, M. Bhaktavatsalam, and M. A. Chidambaram, Sanjivi developed Voluntary Health Services with the work on the hospital building starting in 1961, the foundation stone laid by then prime minister of India, Jawaharlal Nehru. In two years time, the hospital was ready to admit the first inpatient. The institution has grown over the years to become a tertiary care 405 bedded referral hospital and still maintains the practice of 70 percent of patients getting free medical service which includes food and medicines.

Sanjivi was reported to have contributed to the development of primary healthcare movement in India. During his service with the Madras Medical Service, he established several mini health centres, a model he continued with VHS. The institution manages 14 mini health centres in villages and small towns serving around 100,000 people and attends to immunization, maternity care, family welfare, sanitation and hygiene, school health examination, and maintenance of birth and death records. It also runs a medical aid plan, a form of insurance scheme for the lower and middle income families. Towards the latter part of his life, Sanjivi got involved in the Aid prevention and control activities and one year after his death, his activities were recognized by the United States Agency for International Development (USAID) by selecting VHS in 1965 as a nodal agency for the implementation of the AIDS Prevention and Control (APAC) project in the state of Tamil Nadu.

The Government of India awarded Sanjivi the civilian award of Padma Shri in 1971. He was again selected for the national award in 1976, this time for the third highest honour of Padma Bhushan. Voluntary Health Services honours him with an annual lecture, K. S. Sanjivi Endowment Lecture, since 1995, Aruna Roy, Vishwa Mohan Katoch and Ravi Narayan being some of the notable personalities who have delivered the lecture in the past. The auditorium at VHS is also named after him.

K. S. Sanjivi died in October 1994 at the age of 91.
