= K. Swaminathan =

Indian literary scholar (1896–1994)

Krishnaswami Swaminathan (3 December 1896 – 19 May 1994) was an Indian literary scholar and the Chief Editor of the Collected Works of Mahatma Gandhi.

== Early life and education ==
Swaminathan was born in Pudukottai on 3 December 1896. His father, P. S. Krishnaswami, was a sanitary engineer in the Madras Government who after retirement undertook the first complete translation into Tamil of Valmiki’s Ramayana. Swaminathan had an elder sister, Veda, who died in 1936. He had two younger brothers: the scientist K. Venkataraman and the doctor K. S. Sanjivi, while actor Madhav Sharma is his great-nephew.

Swaminathan was educated in Madras (now Chennai), first at the Evangelical Lutheran Mission School and then at the PS High School in Mylapore. On matriculating in 1912, Swaminathan joined Presidency College where he was to spend five years, finishing his Intermediate before taking a first-class degree in English Literature. He then did a degree in law, and moved to Pudukottai to practice. However, he soon left the law to teach English literature at Sri Minakshi College, Chidambaram.

In 1924 Swaminathan won a scholarship to Christ Church, Oxford, where he took an M. A. in English literature. At Oxford he was active in the student body known as Majlis, where he befriended the future Prime Minister of Ceylon, S. W. R. D. Bandaranaike.

== Academic and literary career ==
On his return to India, Swaminathan resumed his job at Chidambaram before moving in 1930 to teach at his alma mater, Presidency College in Madras. While teaching English, Swaminathan was also active in promoting the study and appreciation of Tamil literature. He was instrumental in having a statue of the Tamil scholar and editor, U. V. Swaminatha Iyer, installed in the Presidency College campus. In 1934, Swaminathan wrote a comic opera, called Kattaivandi (the Cart), an adaptation of Gilbert and Sullivan’s The Gondoliers, which was staged several times in Madras and other southern towns. Several performances were put up by the Presidency College’s Dramatic Association, the proceeds going to The Hindu’s Bihar Earthquake Relief Fund. Swaminathan was also a prolific writer of reviews and literary essays in both English and Tamil newspapers.

Between 1948 and 1953 Swaminathan served as Principal of Government Arts College in Madras. After retiring from teaching, he became Associate Editor of The Indian Express, with special responsibility for bringing out their weekend supplement, The Sunday Standard. While the main newspaper, edited by Frank Moraes, focused on politics, economics, foreign affairs and sport, the weekend supplement, handled by Swaminathan, published book reviews, features, poems, and short stories. Among his scoops was to get the translated text of C. Rajagopalachari’s celebrated rendition of the Ramayana, originally written in Tamil. This was later published as a book by the Bharatiya Vidya Bhavan. Swaminathan also serialized in the Sunday Standard the talks on the Gita of Gandhi’s long-time disciple, Vinoba Bhave. These lectures, as edited by Swaminathan, were later published in book form by George Allen and Unwin.

== Editor of the Collected Works of Mahatma Gandhi ==
Swaminathan first met Mahatma Gandhi in April 1915, during Gandhi's first visit to Madras after his return to India from South Africa. A group of college students, including Swaminathan, were asked to attend on Gandhi. Swaminathan recalled that his duties included ‘mending [Gandhi’s] quill pens because he would not use nibs, then all imported, filling his ink-stand with swadeshi ink and going with him on foot or by tram to the Roman Catholic Bishop’s house in San Thome, the Anglican Bishop’s house near St. George’s Cathedral, the Mahajana Sabha Hall [in] Mount Road, Ranade Hall, Mylapore, George Town, Royapettah and various other locations.’

On Gandhi’s later trips to Madras, Swaminathan occasionally attended his public meetings. Although he never joined the freedom movement, Swaminathan admired Gandhi and was inspired by him. He took a special interest in the emancipation of Dalits. He ran adult literary classes for Dalit households in Madras, and also opened a hostel for Dalit college students.

In 1956, the Publications Division of the Government of India began a project to bring out Gandhi’s published and unpublished writings in book form, and in three languages: English, Hindi, and Marathi. They appointed the scholar and freedom fighter Bharatan Kumarappa to oversee the project as its Chief Editor. However, Kumarappa died in 1957, and his replacement, Jairamdas Daulatram, left after two years to take up a seat in the Rajya Sabha.

In February 1960, Swaminathan moved to Delhi to take over as Chief Editor of Gandhi’s Collected Works. He had been recommended for the post by Vinoba Bhave. At this time, only four volumes of the series had been published. He stayed in the job for twenty-five years, in this time overseeing the publication of a further eighty-six volumes. He supervised a staff of sixty, who included the literary scholar C. N. Patel, who was in charge of the Gujarati edition, and the poet Bhawani Prasad Mishra, who edited the Hindi edition.

Each volume of the Collected Works was meticulously edited by Swaminathan and his colleagues. Each had a preface, an appendix, a chronology, a list of sources, and an index, while the main text containing Gandhi’s writings were carefully footnoted and annotated. As the American scholar of Gandhi, Joan Bondurant, has written, ‘in the verification of sources, authentication of authorship, identification of little-known persons in letters, and addition of valuable background and appendix materials, they [the editors of Gandhi’s Collected Works] have met the highest standards of scholarship’.

In January 1972, K. Swaminathan was awarded the Republic of India’s third highest civilian honour, the Padma Bhushan, thus joining his brother, K. Venkataraman, who had been awarded a Padma Bhushan in 1961. The third brother, K. S. Sanjivi, was awarded the Padma Bhushan in 1976.

In April 1984, the ninetieth volume of the Collected Works was released in New Delhi. The volume ended with what Gandhi had said or written on the last day of his life, 30 January 1948. In her foreword to this volume, then Prime Minister Indira Gandhi remarked: ‘I wish to place on record my appreciation and that of the Government of India of the dedication and competence of Professor K. Swaminathan and his team of editors, research scholars and staff who have laboured over the last twenty-five years to complete this monumental work’.

== Personal life ==
Swaminathan was married to Visalakshi, a native of Pudukottai. They had four children, Mahalakshi (born 1925), Sriram (born 1928), Shantha (born 1930), and Dharma (born 1935). In the year 1940 Swaminathan first met the sage Ramana Maharishi at Tiruvannamalai. He came to regard Ramana as his spiritual preceptor, and went several times a year to see him. Swaminathan was also to later publish a short biography of Ramana.

== Final years ==
In 1985 K. Swaminathan retired to his home town, Madras. Although he was no longer Chief Editor of the Collected Works of Mahatma Gandhi, he assisted his former colleagues in New Delhi in bring out seven supplementary volumes and in preparing consolidated subject and person indexes to the series. In his last years he was active in a citizens’ group seeking to bring an end to the civil war in Sri Lanka.

Swaminathan died in Madras on 19 May 1994.
