= Voluntary Health Services hospital, Chennai =

Voluntary Health Services
- Charitable trust
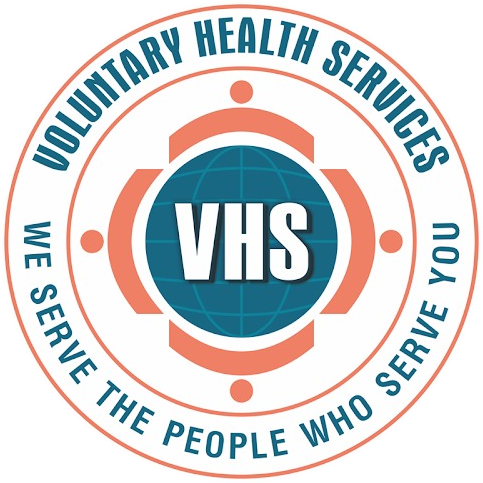

- Head Quarters Location in Chennai, Tamil Nadu, India

Geography
- Location: Taramani, Chennai, Tamil Nadu, India
- Coordinates: 13°00′10″N 80°14′46″E

Organisation
- Care system: Charity Based Trust Hospital Registered under Societies Act
- Type: Multi-Speciality Hospital and Research Institute
- Affiliated university: National Board of Examinations in Medical Sciences

Services
- Beds: 218

History
- Founded: 1958; 68 years ago

Links
- Website: Official Website
- Lists: Hospitals in India

Voluntary Health Services, popularly known as the VHS Hospital, is a multispecialty tertiary care referral hospital in the south Indian state of Tamil Nadu, reportedly serving the economically weaker sections of the society. It was founded in 1958 by Krishnaswami Srinivas Sanjivi, an Indian physician, social worker and a winner of Padma Shri and Padma Bhushan awards and is run by a charitable non governmental organization of the same name. The hospital is situated along Rajiv Gandhi Salai at Taramani, in Chennai.

== History ==
Srinivas Sanjivi, a senior official with the Madras Medical College, resigned from the government service in 1957 and with the assistance of some of the prominent social leaders in Chennai such as Kasturi Srinivasan, T. R. Venkatarama Sastri, M. Bhaktavatsalam, and M. A. Chidambaram, he registered a charitable trust under the Societies Registration Act, 1860 with the name, Voluntary Health Services, on 14 July 1958 for serving the economically weaker sections of the society. The Foundation Stone of the hospital building was laid by Jawaharlal Nehru, then prime minister of India on 8 October 1961 and the hospital became functional on 15 July 1963.

== Facilities ==
The hospital is a tertiary care referral hospital with facility for treating more than 200 inpatients and has more than 35 major specialties as below.

=== A. Clinical Specialties ===
1. Cardiology
2. Diabetes & Endocrinology
3. Internal medicine
4. Master Health Check-Up
5. Medical Gastroenterology
6. Nephrology
7. Neurology
8. Pulmonology

=== B. Critical & Emergency Care ===
1. Anesthesiology
2. Emergency Medicine & Trauma
3. Intensive care unit

=== C. Diagnostic Services ===
1. Laboratory Services
2. Radiology
3. Department of Ultrasound

=== D. Maternal & Child Health ===
1. Developmental Pediatrics
2. Obstetrics & Gynecology
3. Pediatrics & Neonatology

=== E. Medical specialty ===
1. Community health
2. Infectious Diseases
3. Projects Division
4. Psychiatry & De-Addiction Centre
5. Transfusion medicine

=== F. Specialty Services ===
1. Dentistry
2. Dermatology
3. Geriatric Medicine
4. Oncology
5. Physiotherapy & Rehabilitation centre

=== G. Surgical specialties ===
1. E.N.T. (Otorhinolaryngology)
2. General surgery
3. Neurosurgery
4. Ophthalmology
5. Orthopedics & Spine
6. Plastic surgery
7. Gastroenterology
8. Urology

VHS provides supportive services at an affordable cost and equipped with CT scan, MRI scan, Ultrasound scan, DEXA, Cath lab, Digital X-ray, Dialysis, Intensive care unit, Post Operative Wards, 24x7 laboratory, Senior Citizen Home and other facilities. The hospital is managing "State of the Art NICU(Neonatal intensive care unit)". VHS is approved by Government of Tamil Nadu Chief Minister's Health insurance Scheme. VHS is accredited by the National Accreditation Board for Hospitals & Healthcare Providers (NABH).

The neurology department was started in 1965 and handles clinical psychology, physiotherapy, epilepsy, special needs treatment and dietetics. Gynaecology department started as an outpatient wing in 1965 with ante and post-natal care. In 1991, obstetric and infertility clinics were also added for attending to high risk deliveries.

The neurosurgical centre, named Dr. A. Lakshmipathi Neurosurgical Centre, was started by the renowned neurosurgeon, Balasubramaniam Ramamurthi, in 1978. It has grown to be a tertiary level referral centre and has facility for treating complicated cranial and spinal disorders.

The General Surgery Department attends to Gastrointestinal, Thoracic and Abdominal Surgeries such as hernia, thyroid issues, appendectomy as well as invasive procedures such as colonoscopy and endoscopy. The hospital has a well-equipped ophthalmology section for the treatment of glaucoma, retinal diseases and macular disorders and carries out vitreo-retinal and cataract surgeries. The Department of Psychiatry, named Rajaji Centre for De-Addiction, has 22 beds and apart from outpatient services, short-term in-patient services for de-addiction treatment are also provided. VHS has been operating a blood bank since 1963 where only voluntary blood donation is accepted.

=== The Institute of Neurological Sciences ===
The Institute of Neurological Sciences (TINS) at VHS, was established by Prof. Krishnamoorthy Srinivas in year 1965. Over 50 years TINS has expanded into a hub for community-based professional training, academic courses, internship trainings for post graduate candidates (social work and psychology) providing exposure to neuroscience research and expert clinical neurology. The Department offers Fellowship in Neuropsychiatry and Doctoral Program in Neuropsychiatry, Neurology and Clinical Neurosciences. The coursework is affiliated to the Tamil Nadu Dr. M.G.R. Medical University.

TINS was one of the global project-site of 10/66 Dementia Project with E. S. Krishnamoorthy as principal investigator. E. S Krishnamoorthy and Vivek Misra have also been instrumental in establishing the M.A.T.C.H Project (Maximising Through Comprehensive Healthcare), a community-based healthcare program having Pediatrics and Geriatrics arm focusing upon mental health in community population. The project was funded by Dr. Deepa Krishnan Foundation and B.N.P. Paribas Sundram Finance.

== Social initiatives ==
VHS has been providing free medical care to around 70 percent of its patients since its inception. The eligibility for free medical aid is fixed at a certain earning level of the patients or their families and include medicines, stay and food. It runs a primary health care network of 14 Mini Health Centres in the state of Tamil Nadu under the Department of Community Health. This Community Health program is managed in close association with the Indian Council of Medical Research and UNICEF. The health centres serve around 100,000 people in small towns and villages of Tamil Nadu with regard to water and sanitation, nutrition, women's health, communicable and non-communicable diseases, child health, immunization, clinical practice, school health education, and maintenance of birth and death records. The project also covers a medical aid plan, a form of insurance scheme for the lower and middle-income families.

The Projects Division of VHS (CHARTERED) implements various projects in the thematic areas of HIV/AIDS, HIV-TB, Health System Strengthening, Non-Communicable Diseases, Infectious Diseases, COVID-19, Community Health, etc.

VHS has been recognised by the United States Agency for International Development (USAID) as its partner and demonstrated AIDS Prevention and Control (APAC) Project from 1995 to 2012 in Tamil Nadu & Puducherry and South-to-South HIV/AIDS Resource Exchange (SHARE) Project from 2012 to 2015. VHS has contributed to the implementation of prevention programs on STI/HIV/AIDS, provided Technical Assistance and facilitated Knowledge Transfer through its APAC and SHARE Projects. The Tamil Nadu AIDS Initiative (TAI) Project supported by Bill & Melinda Gates Foundation (BMGF) - Avahan from 2004 to 2014. Overall, VHS has contributed to the reversal of HIV epidemic in the State.

Also managed and demonstrated project on Technical Assistance to National AIDS Control Program with the support from Centers for Disease Control and Prevention (CDC) and contributed for piloting innovations, developing new models, strengthening systems, policy formulation, etc. in partnership with key stakeholders including NACO, SACS, TSUs, DAPCUs, NTSUs, etc.

VHS-Projects Division has managed more than 20 major long-term comprehensive and holistic community health projects with assistance from USAID, CDC, GFATM, BMGF, UNDP, Save the Children International, World Bank, Wellcome Trust, and other organizations with the major thrust on disease prevention and health promotion. The VHS Projects Division partnered with international / national donors, central / state ministries, academic / research and universities, corporates, NGOs and CBOs, and other organizations.

The Projects Division of VHS partnered with Centers for Disease Control and Prevention (CDC) and managing Project ASPIRE (Advancing Sustainability, Partnerships and Innovations for Reaching Epidemic Control), supported by CDC-DGHT-India and Project NIRANTAR (Accelerating Sustainability of Public Health Systems in India to Prevent, Detect, and Respond to Infectious Disease Outbreaks and Other Public Health Emergencies), supported by CDC-DGHP-India.

Revathi Raj, a paediatric haematologist has established the Thalassaemia Welfare Association in VHS with assistance from TTK Foundation and Rotary Club Madras. The centre provides patients afflicted with thalassemia with free blood transfusions, iron chelation therapy and consultative care. The association has schemes for information dissemination on the disease and plans to conduct regular blood checks at Colleges in Chennai.

== Honouring the founder ==
Voluntary Health Services honours its founder, K. S. Sanjivi, with an annual lecture, K. S. Sanjivi Endowment Lecture, since 1995, Aruna Roy, Vishwa Mohan Katoch and Ravi Narayan being some of the notable personalities who have delivered the lecture in the past. The auditorium at VHS is also named after him.

== Notable Physicians ==
- B. K. Misra
- Balasubramaniam Ramamurthi
- Ennapadam Srinivas Krishnamoorthy

== See also ==
- Healthcare in Chennai
- United States Agency for International Development
- Kasturi Srinivasan
- T. R. Venkatarama Sastri
- M. Bhaktavatsalam
- M. A. Chidambaram
- Krishnaswami Srinivas Sanjivi
- Avahan
