= Indian Economic and Social History Review =

- Discipline: Asian history, Economic history
- Language: English

Publication details
- History: 1964–present
- Publisher: SAGE Publishing
- Frequency: Quarterly

Standard abbreviations
- ISO 4: Indian Econ. Soc. Hist. Rev.

Indexing
- ISSN: 0019-4646
- OCLC no.: 01752856

Links
- Journal homepage

The Indian Economic and Social History Review is an academic journal of Indian social and economic history. It is one of the leading journals of South Asian history, if not the best. It is owned by Indian Economic and Social History Association, a registered society of Delhi. The journal is run by a two-tiered structure of an editorial board that is led by one or more Managing Editors. It is published by SAGE Publications. The founding editor-in-chief was Tapan Raychaudhuri, who was succeeded by Dharma Kumar. After Dharma Kumar relinquished its editorship on account of illness in early 1990s, Sanjay Subrahmanyam took over and was soon followed by Sunil Kumar who became a Managing Editor alongwith G. Balachandran. Sunil Kumar was the person behind the journal until he died suddenly in January 2021 when he was replaced by Pankaj Jha. Currently it has seven editors including Sanjay Subrahmanyam and Whitney Cox. Pankaj Jha (LSR College, DU) Tirthankar Roy (London School of Economics), and Jyoti Balachandran (Pennsylvania State University) are its current Managing Editors. {https://journals.sagepub.com/editorial-board/IER}. The journal is a member of the Committee on Publication Ethics (COPE).

== Abstracting and indexing ==
Indian Economic and Social History Review is abstracted and indexed in:

- EBSCO: EconLit
- ProQuest: International Bibliography of the Social Sciences (IBSS)
- Social Sciences Citation Index (Web of Science)
- SCOPUS
- Research Papers in Economics (RePEc)
- DeepDyve
- Portico
- Dutch-KB
- Pro-Quest-RSP
- EBSCO
- Ohio
- Sociological Abstracts - ProQuest
- Social Services Abstracts - ProQuest
- Worldwide Political Science Abstracts - ProQuest
- Bibliography of Asian Studies (BAS)
- J-Gate
