= Avahan =

HIV project in India

- Formation: 2003
- Purpose: HIV prevention
- Region served: South India and Northeast States
- Parent organisation: Bill & Melinda Gates Foundation
- Website: http://www.gatesfoundation.org/avahan/

Avahan (Hindi: आवाहन, lit. 'Invocation') was an initiative sponsored by the Bill & Melinda Gates Foundation to reduce the spread of HIV in India. It began in 2003 and by 2013, the control of the programme transitioned to the Government of India in phases. As of 2009 the Gates Foundation had pledged US$338 million to the programme, whose aim was to reduce HIV transmission and the prevalence of STIs in vulnerable high-risk populations, notably female sex workers, MSM, and injecting drug users (IDU), through prevention education and services such as condom promotion, STI management, behaviour change communication, community mobilisation, and advocacy. Avahan worked in six high-prevalence states. All the states in India who had a HIV prevalence of more than 1 per cent in the year 2002, were considered as HIV high-prevalent states. All the states had a lead partner and other NGOs and CBOs at the district-level who implemented the prevention programme. India HIV/AIDS Alliance was the state lead partner in Andhra Pradesh, Karnataka Health Promotion Trust in Karnataka, Path Finder in Maharashtra, Tamil Nadu AIDS Initiative and Voluntary Health Services (VHS) in Tamil Nadu. The other two states are Nagaland and Manipur in the North-East of India had Emmanuel Hospital Association and Australian International Health Institute as lead partners. Apart from the State Lead Partners, Avahan had cross-cutting partners for advocacy in Centre for Advocacy and Research, for Police Advocacy in Constella Futures, care and support in Care International. After Avahan, BMGF shifted its focus on TB, maternal and child health and other areas like polio.

== Founding ==
The Bill & Melinda Gates Foundation launched Avahan in 2003 for the purpose of developing a model HIV prevention system in India and promoting others in India and worldwide to adopt their model.

== Strategy ==
Rather than staffing HIV prevention workers on its own, Avahan provides government health organisations and NGOs with the tools they need to conduct HIV prevention on their own. Avahan's primary prevention techniques included the following:

- training social workers to do peer education
- funding sexually transmitted infection (STI) testing and treatment
- distributing condoms
- forcing communities who receive any aid to take total responsibility for the management of that aid
- funding social media to reduce stigma associated with STIs
- fostering access to HIV care and treatment

== Impact ==
In October 2011 a study published in The Lancet, funded by the Bill & Melinda Gates Foundation, concluded that between 2003-2008 in areas where the Avahan project was active, the programme reduced community rates of HIV transmission by 50 per cent. Avahan may have prevented 6,00,000 new HIV infections in India in the states served by it.
