= Allan–Robinson reaction =

Chemical reaction

The Allan–Robinson reaction is the chemical reaction of o-hydroxyaryl ketones with aromatic anhydrides to form flavones (or isoflavones).

If aliphatic anhydrides are used, coumarins can also be formed. (See Kostanecki acylation.)

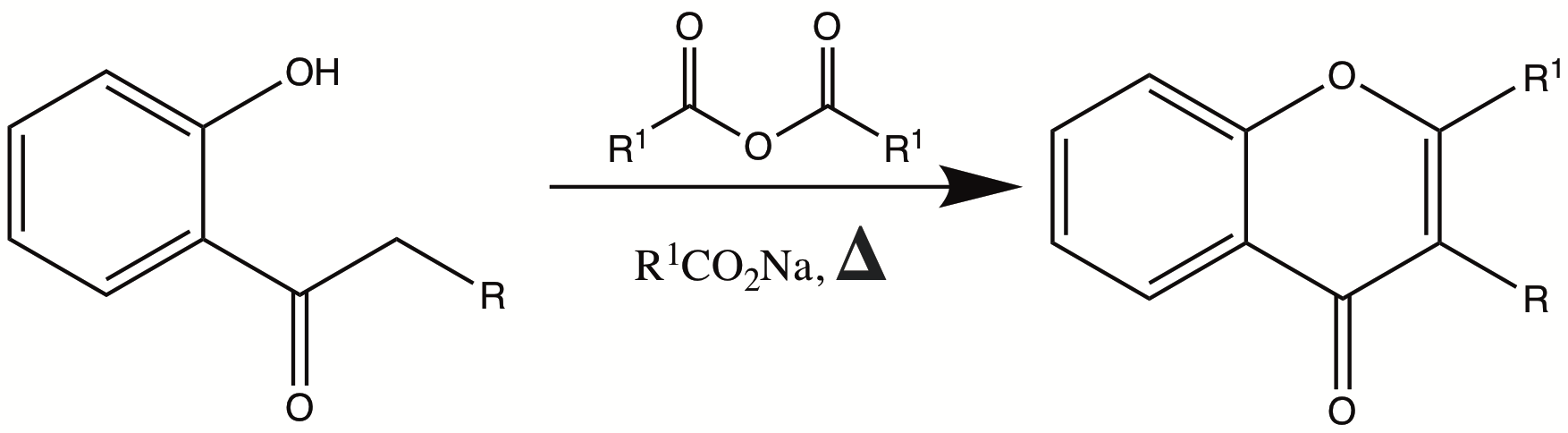
Reaction overview

== Mechanism ==
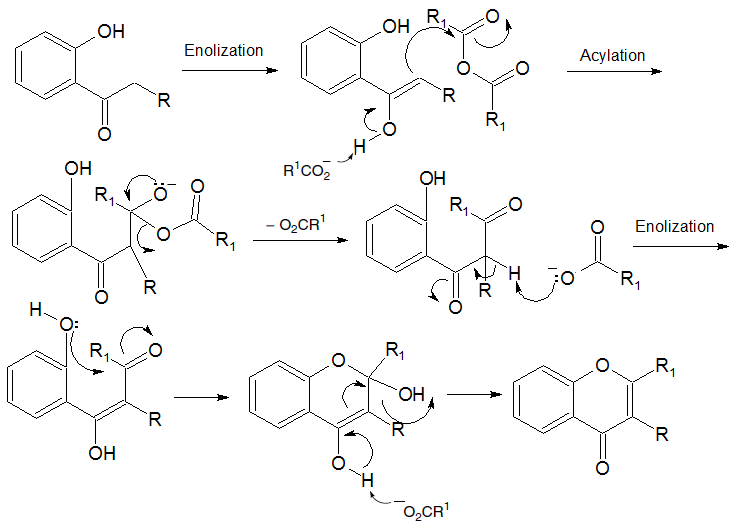

The o-hydroxyaryl ketone first undergoes tautomerization to form the respective enol. The pi electrons of the double bond then attack the electrophilic carbon of the anhydride; a carboxylate anion is subsequently lost as a leaving group. The carboxylate anion then attacks an alpha hydrogen to form an enol. The nucleophilic hydroxyl group then attacks the carbonyl carbon to form a six-membered heterocyclic ring. A proton is abstracted from the hydroxyl group of the enol to form a ketone, and the remaining hydroxyl group is lost as a leaving group in a concerted step to afford the final product.

== See also ==
- Baker–Venkataraman rearrangement
- Kostanecki acylation
- Robert Robinson (organic chemist)
