= Lovraj Kumar =

Lovraj Kumar (1926–1994) was an Indian civil servant who had a role in forming Indian economic policies from the late 1950s until the early 1980s.

Kumar was born in Nainital in 1926, and attended The Doon School, Dehradun. He became India's first Rhodes Scholar in 1947 and went to read Chemistry at Magdalen College, Oxford. On returning to India, he joined Burmah Oil. In government, his most important post was as Secretary of the Ministry of Petroleum, and his last job was as Secretary of the Ministry of Steel from which he retired in 1984.

He married Dharma Kumar, who was an economist, in 1951; Radha Kumar is their daughter.

During his retirement he chaired many committees and institutions, including the Governors of the Doon School, the Wildlife Fund of India, and the National Council for Applied Economic Research.
