= Uthaman =

Uthaman may refer to:

- Uththaman, 1976 Indian Tamil-language film
- Uthaman (2001 film), 2001 Indian Malayalam-language film
- Harish Uthaman (born 1982), Indian film actor

== See also ==
- Uthama Puthiran (disambiguation)
- Uthamapalayam (disambiguation)
- Uttam, an Indian name
- Uttama (Chola dynasty), ruler of the Chola dynasty in southern India
