= Sharad Panday =

Indian heart surgeon (1934–2004)

- Born: 22 October 1934; Bombay, Bombay Presidency, British India (present-day Mumbai, Maharashtra, India)
- Died: 8 November 2004 (aged 70); Mumbai, Maharashtra, India
- Occupation: Heart surgeon
- Spouse: Snehlata Panday
- Children: Chunky Panday; Chikki Panday
- Family: Panday family

Sharad Panday (22 October 1934 – 8 November 2004) was an Indian heart surgeon. He was part of the surgical team that conducted India's first heart transplant at the King Edward Memorial Hospital and Seth Gordhandas Sunderdas Medical College in Mumbai.

== Early life and education ==
Sharad Panday was born on 22 October 1934 in Bombay (now Mumbai), India. A student of Don Bosco High School, Matunga, he completed medicine and Bachelor of Medicine, Bachelor of Surgery at Grant Medical College and Sir Jamshedjee Jeejeebhoy Group of Hospitals, Bombay. Panday moved to Canada to complete his Master of Surgery and Fellowship of the Royal College of Physicians and Surgeons, Canada. He was a recipient of the Ontario Heart Foundation fellowship in 1969.

== Career ==
After Panday returned to India from Canada, he joined the King Edward Memorial Hospital and Seth Gordhandas Sunderdas Medical College (KEM), in which he performed many open heart surgeries. The hospital was one of the few institutions in India offering heart surgery during that period. Panday was the chief of the second unit at KEM.

On 16 February 1968, P. K. Sen and Sharad Panday performed the first heart transplant in India and only the sixth in the world at KEM.

Panday, who trained under the Canadian surgeon Wilfred Gordon Bigelow, adopted the technique and tailored it to Indian conditions. He performed bloodless open heart surgeries at KEM in the 1970s and 1980s. Bloodless heart surgery was also performed on Jehovah's Witnesses.

In 1986 Panday performed a heart operation at the Nanavati hospital in Bombay, wherein a large tumor was removed from the left ventricle of a 29-year-old patient. This was the first operation of its kind in India, as tumors in that part of the heart are considered uncommon.

== Later years ==
After retiring from KEM, Panday went into private practice and set up the heart ward at the Nanavati hospital in Mumbai.

== Affiliations ==
With the spread of cardiovascular surgery in India, the annual scientific meeting of the thoracic and cardiovascular surgeons was held independently in 1985 under the new title Association of Thoracic and Cardiovascular Surgeons of India. In 1990 the Indian Association of Cardiovascular-thoracic Surgeons was registered at Bombay. On 15 June 1991, the Association of Thoracic and Cardiovascular Surgeons of India was dissolved through a unanimous resolution passed by its general body during its annual meeting in Bombay, and its entire membership, funds, and assets were transferred to the new Association of Cardiovascular-thoracic Surgeons. Panday was elected as the first president of the latter society on 15 June 1991. The following year, the Fellowship of the Association (F.I.A.C.S) was instituted and regular biannual publication of the Journal of the Indian Association of Cardiovascular-thoracic Surgeons commenced.

== Personal life and death ==
Panday was married to Snehlata Panday, a physician by profession; the couple had two children, Chunky Pandey and Chikki Panday. He died on 8 November 2004 at his residence in Mumbai, India. After his death, a junction was named after him in the suburb of Bandra, Mumbai.

== Selected publications ==
- Clinical and diagnostic features of pulmonary valve endocarditis in the setting of congenital cardiac malformations, published in the International Journal of Cardiology.
- Uncommon presentation of choroid plexus papilloma in an infant
- Supranational haemangioblastoma without von Hippel–Lindau syndrome in an adult: A rare tumor with review of literature
- Cerebral intraventricular echinococcosis in an adult, Bilateral occipital extradural hematoma in a child
- Spinal intradural extramedullary mature cystic teratoma in an adult: A rare tumor with review of literature
- High incidence of neural tube defects in Northern part of India
- A Prospective Randomized Study Comparing Non-absorb-able Polypropylene' Delayed Absorbable Polyglactin 910 Suture Material in Mass Closure of Vertical Laparotomy Wounds and Bilateral Mirror Image Cervical Neurosurgical in an Adult with Neurotransmitters Type 1
- Dorsal spinal epidural psammomatous meningioma in an adult male
- Acquired dorsal intraspinal epidermoid cyst in an adult female
- Supratentorial haemangioblastoma without von Hippel–Lindau syndrome in an adult: A rare tumor with review of literature
- Open-heart surgery, A study of 100 clinical cases, which covered 180 open-heart surgeries from January 1970 to June 1973.
