= Uthamapalayam (disambiguation) =

Uthamapalayam is a town in Tamil Nadu, India.

Uthamapalayam may also refer to these related to the town:

- Uthamapalayam block, a revenue block
- Uthamapalayam division, a revenue division
- Uthamapalayam taluk, a subdistrict

== See also ==
- Uthaman (disambiguation)
- Palayam (disambiguation)
