= Uttam =

Uttam is an Indian given name. Notable people with the name include:

- Uttam Bandu Tupe (1932 – 2020) Indian writer and poet
- Uttam Gada
- Uttam Kamble
- Uttam Khobragade
- Uttam Kumar
- Uttam Kumar (artist)
- Uttam Kunwar
- Uttam Mohanty
- Uttam Nakate
- Uttam Neupane
- Uttam Rai
- Uttam Sarkar
- Uttam Singh
- Uttama Chola
- Uttambhai Nathalal Mehta
- Uttambhai Patel
- Uttamchand Khimchand Sheth
- Uttamrao Dhikale
- Uttamrao Patil
- Uttamsingh Pawar

== See also ==
- Uttam AESA Radar, an Indian aircraft fire-control radar
