= Alok Sharma (disambiguation) =

Alok Sharma (born 1967) is a British politician.

Alok Sharma may also refer to:

- Alok Sharma (cricketer) (born 1991), Indian cricketer
- Alok Sharma (neuroscientist) (born 1961), Indian neuroscientist
- Alok Sharma (Indian politician)
- Alok Sharma (police officer), Indian Police Service officer
