= Max Super Speciality Hospital, Lucknow =

Coordinates: 26.8505055°N 81.0243433°E

- Max Healthcare
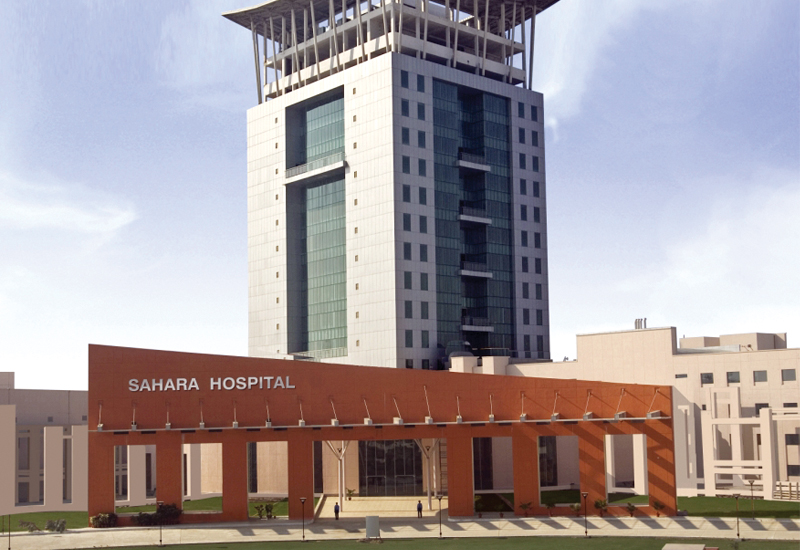

Geography
- Location: Lucknow, Lucknow district, Uttar Pradesh, India

Organisation
- Care system: Private

Services
- Emergency department: Yes
- Beds: 250 (expandable to 554 beds)

History
- Founded: 2009

Links
- Website: www.maxhealthcare.in/hospital-network/max-super-speciality-hospital-lucknow
- Lists: Hospitals in India

Max Super Speciality Hospital, Lucknow (formerly Sahara Hospital) is a tertiary care private hospital in Lucknow, capital city of Uttar Pradesh state of India. The hospital is owned by Max Healthcare.

== History ==
Established as Sahara Hospital, this was the project of Sahara India Medical Institute Limited, a subsidiary of Sahara Prime City Limited. It sits on a 27-acre (11 ha) campus at Lucknow's Gomti Nagar neighbourhood. It was designed by Mumbai-based architect Hafeez Contractor. The construction contract for the hospital building (set at ₹490 million (US$5.1 million)) was given to Larsen & Toubro. The total cost of the project was ₹4 billion (US$42 million), which also included the cost of medical equipment. Rising 70 metres (230 ft) and 19 floors, it was the tallest building in Lucknow when it opened.

The hospital was inaugurated on 12 February 2009 by Chhabi Roy, mother of founder and chairman of the Sahara India Pariwar Subrata Roy.

In 2023, Max Healthcare bought this hospital for ₹940 crore. In April 2024 after takeover from Max Healthcare, it was renamed as Max Super Speciality Hospital, Lucknow.

== Services ==
Among the hospital's medical specialties are general surgery, obstetrics and gynaecology, orthopedics, neurology and nephrology. There are two separate departments for oncology: the Department of Surgical Oncology, and the Department of Medical Oncology. The hospital started a hematopoietic stem cell transplantation programme in 2011. Among other specialty services are cardiology, physiotherapy and sports medicine, and transfusion medicine. The hospital has equipment for cardiac monitoring, magnetic resonance imaging, and computed tomography.

The hospital is the first medical centre in Uttar Pradesh to perform a successful elbow transplant and endoscopic cervical plate placement. Patients admitted in the 'critical care area' of the hospital can be monitored by the internet protocol cameras. In addition to physicians, this remote monitoring facility is provided to the relatives of patients, so that hygiene and sterility of such areas can be maintained.
