= Nilima Arun Kshirsagar =

Indian clinical pharmacologist

- Born: 1949 (age 76–77); Mumbai, Maharashtra, India
- Education: Doctor of Medicine; King Edward Memorial Hospital and Seth Gordhandas Sunderdas Medical College
- Medical career
- Profession: Clinical Pharmacologists
- Research: Liposomal Formulations

Nilima Arun Kshirsagar (born 1949) is an Indian clinical pharmacologist who developed and patented liposomal amphotericin B and its drug delivery system in 1993. She is the former dean of King Edward Memorial Hospital and Seth Gordhandas Sunderdas Medical College. She is the national chairperson in clinical pharmacology at Indian Council of Medical Research (ICMR) and president of the South Asian chapter of the American college of clinical pharmacology. She is a Member of the WHO Committees on Product development and Drug statistics Methodology.

Kshirsagar is a fellow of the National Academy of Sciences, India, a fellow of the Searle Research Center, England, Faculty of Pharmaceutical Medicine UK and Fellow of American College of Clinical Pharmacology, USA. She is the Chair of the core training Panel of Pharmacovigilance Programme of India.

She established departments of Clinical Pharmacology at KEM Hospital and at Nair Hospital Mumbai. The drug Liposomal Amphotericin-b, used to treat the Indian Mucormycosis epidemic of 2021 was developed and patented in India by Nalini Kshirsagar in 1993.

== Career ==
In 1977, after her doctorate she became assistant professor at King Edward Memorial Hospital and Seth Gordhandas Sunderdas Medical College and she was promoted to associate professor in 1985. In 1993 she become a Professor and a Member of the steering committee of World Health Organization and a member of the advisory commission on product development and evaluate science program at Haffkine Institute. In 1993 she become the founding Head of the Department of Clinical Pharmacology at KEM, Mumbai, India.

Kshirsagar was later made the Dean, the Professor and the Head of the Clinical Pharmacology department at King Edward Memorial Hospital and Seth Gordhandas Sunderdas Medical College.

== Notable work ==
Bimal Kumar Bachhawat, Kshirsagar and Uttamchand Khimchand Sheth are credited with creating the research and academic structure for teaching pharmacology in India.

Bachhawat encouraged Kshirsagar and Sunil Pandya to set up a liposome research laboratory. Under the leadership of Kshirsagar a new department of clinical pharmacology was set up at the KEM and at Nair Hospital Mumbai with financial help from the Brihanmumbai Municipal Corporation.

Conventional amphotericin B was developed in the 1950s and for many decades it was the only antifungal agent available for the treatment of invasive fungal diseases. It was a standard care for a range of pathogenic fungus, however nephrotoxicity and infusion-related reactions was a major constraint. Kshirsagar and her team improved the techniques of the production of liposomes derived from soyabean Lecithin to make them usable in human beings. Liposomal amphotericin B, a lipid formulation of amphotericin B, was developed in India. Pharmacological and preclinical tests of liposomal amphotericin B drug delivery system were successful.

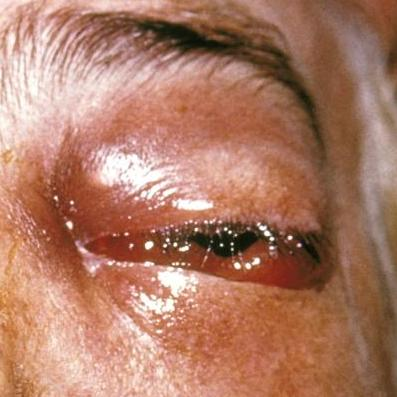
Eye infected with mucormycosis

Use of liposomes as a delivery system for Amphotericin B was highly effective and less toxic as it carries the drug to the specific site and so it is required in much lower concentrations. After completion of the human trials, Kshirsagar defined the administration and dosing schedules. The product was patented and the technology was transferred through the National Research Development Corporation (NRDC) to a pharmaceutical company for marketing. This was the first drug development initiative of a Public–private partnership model in India. Liposomal Amphotericin-b was used as the primary treatment in the Mucormycosis epidemic of 2021 in India.

During the COVID-19 pandemic in India there was a large increase of cases of what was named "black fungus" or mucormycosis in affected patients. Surgeons had to remove eyes after they were infected. One treatment was a daily injection for eight weeks of anti-fungal intravenous injection of amphotericin B. The injection could be standard amphotericin B deoxycholate or the liposomal form. Kshirsagar's liposomal form cost more but it was considered "safer, more effective and [with] lesser side effects".

The World Health Organization (WHO) launched a global program to eliminate Lymphatic Filariasis in 2000. Kshirsagar's team of Indian scientists worked in two villages, Kurzadi and Selukate in Wardha, Maharashtra ensuring the safety and efficacy of the drugs.

During her tenure as dean of King Edward Memorial Hospital and Seth Gordhandas Sunderdas Medical College capacity was increased from 1,800 to 2,400 beds and the capacity of Intensive care unit beds was enhanced from 160 to 300.

In 2017 Kshirsagar was appointed as chairperson of the expert committee constituted by the Drugs Controller General of India to elaborate on the parameters set out in section 26A of the Drugs and Cosmetics Act of India to decide whether to regulate, restrict or prohibit the sale of over 300 fixed-dose combination drugs in India. Based on a 700-page report submitted by the committee, the Supreme Court of India banned 328 fixed-dose combination drugs in September 2018.

== Awards ==
- Dr. B. C. Roy Award for her work with drugs combating malaria, epilepsy, elephantiasis and heart diseases – (2002).
- Nathaniel T. Kwit memorial Awarde – (2018).
- Professor Archana Sharma Memorial Lecture Awardees – (2018).
- VASVIK Industrial Research Award- Smt. Chandaben Mohanbhai Patel Industrial Research Award for Women Scientists – (1997).
- Mumbai Mayors award for societal contribution.

== Publications ==
Nilima has produced over 200 publications:-

- Kshirsagar, Nilima Arun (August 2014). "Different liposomal amphotericin B formulations for visceral leishmaniasis–Author's reply". The Lancet Global Health. 2 (8): e450. doi:10.1016/S2214-109X(14)70270-0. PMID 25103516.
- Kshirsagar, Nilima Arun, Shinde RR, Mehta S. (August 2006). "Floods in Mumbai: impact of public health service by hospital staff and medical students". Journal of Postgraduate Medicine. 52 (4): 312–314. PMID 17102558.
- Deshpande, Aparna A; Mehta, Sanjay; Kshirsagar, Nilima A (24 February 2007). "Hospital management of Mumbai train blast victims". The Lancet. 369 (9562): 639–640. doi:10.1016/S0140-6736(07)60305-5. PMID 17321304. S2CID 5241646.
- Kshirsagar, Nilima (2017). "Tropical Diseases". Proceedings of the Indian National Science Academy. 95. doi:10.16943/ptinsa/2017/49232.
- Kshirsagar, Nilima A. (2014). "Single-dose liposomal amphotericin B for visceral leishmaniasis". The Lancet Global Health. 2 (4): e203. doi:10.1016/S2214-109X(14)70011-7. PMID 25103058.
- Kshirsagar, Nilima A.; Bachhav, Sagar S. (2013). "Comparative regulatory performance on introduction & withdrawal of drugs in India and EU/Internationally". International Journal of Risk & Safety in Medicine. 25 (4): 235–238. doi:10.3233/JRS-130601. PMID 24305562.
- Kshirsagar, Nilimaa (2013). "Endnote: Vision of research ethics". Perspectives in Clinical Research. 4 (1): 108–111. doi:10.4103/2229-3485.106410. PMC 3601695. PMID 23533993.
- Kshirsagar, Nilima; Kumar, Vijay (2011). "Clinical pharmacology: Prospects and development in India". Indian Journal of Pharmacology. 43 (5): 489–491. doi:10.4103/0253-7613.84946. PMC 3195114. PMID 22021987.
- NA, Kshirsagar. (2021). Symposium- Malaria: Antimalarial resistance and policy ramificationsand challenges. Journal of Postgraduate Medicine (ISSN: 0022-3859) Vol 52 Num 4.
- Kshirsagar, N & Sheth, U. (1977). Drug protein binding: relevance to treatment. Journal of postgraduate medicine. 23. 50-2.
