= Prafulla Sen =

Prafulla Sen is an Indian masculine given name and may refer to:

- Prafulla Kumar Sen (died 1942), Indian revolutionary and philosopher
- Prafulla Chandra Sen (1897–1990), Indian freedom fighter and politician
- Prafulla Kumar Sen or P. K. Sen (surgeon) (1915–1982), Indian surgeon
