= G. B. Parulkar =

Indian cardiothoracic surgeon (1931–2021)

- Born: 1 December 1931; Mumbai, Maharashtra, India
- Died: 4 May 2021 (aged 89)
- Occupation: Cardiothoracic surgeon
- Known for: Cardiovascular and thoracic surgery
- Awards: 1997 Dr. B. C. Roy Award; 1998 Padma Bhushan; 2009 MUHS Marathon Teacher Award

Gurukumar Bhalachandra Parulkar (1 December 1931 – 4 May 2021) was an Indian cardiothoracic surgeon and a professor emeritus at King Edward Memorial Hospital and Seth Gordhandas Sunderdas Medical College. He also served as the president of the Association of Surgeons of India in 1984.

== Biography ==
Born on 1 December 1931 at Mumbai in the Indian state of Maharashtra, Parulkar served as an associate of Prafulla Kumar Sen, a pioneer of cardiac surgery in India. A graduate of the University of Mumbai, he did advanced training at Baylor College of Medicine and on his return to India, he introduced the technique of hypothermic circulatory arrest technique of resection of aortic aneurysms in India. He was one of the doctors who attended to the victim in the Aruna Shanbaug case.

Parulkar received the Dr. B. C. Roy Award from the Medical Council of India in 1997. The Government of India awarded him the Padma Bhushan, the third highest civilian award, in 1998. He is also a recipient of the 2009 The Marathon Teacher Award of the Maharashtra University of Health Sciences and a number of other honors.

Parulkar died on 4 May 2021, at the age of 89.

== See also ==
- Vascular surgery
- Aneurysm
