= Max Healthcare =

Indian multi-specialty hospital chain

Max Healthcare Institute Limited

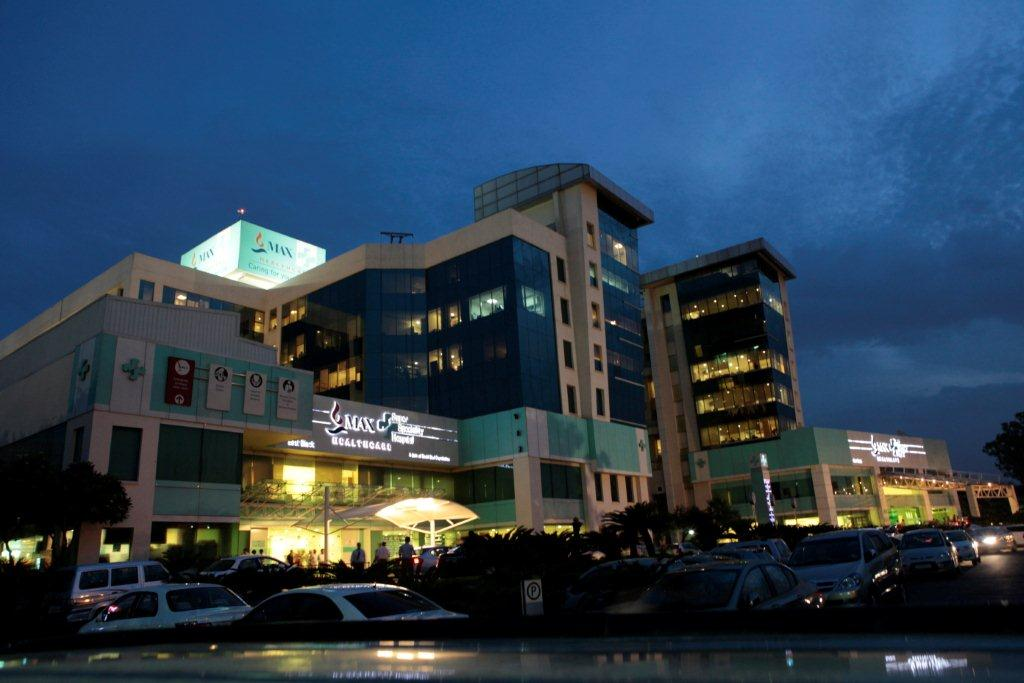
- Max Super Specialty Hospital in Delhi
- Type: Public
- Traded as: BSE: 543220; NSE: MAXHEALTH; NSE NIFTY 50 constituent
- Industry: Healthcare
- Founded: 2001; 25 years ago
- Headquarters: New Delhi, India
- Area served: India
- Key people: Abhay Soi (Chairman & MD)
- Revenue: ▲₹8,373 crore (US$890 million) (FY26)
- Operating income: ▲₹2,243 crore (US$240 million) (FY26)
- Net income: ▲₹1,442 crore (US$150 million) (FY26)
- Owner: Abhay Soi (23.7%)
- Number of employees: 15,000 (2023)
- Website: www.maxhealthcare.in

Max Healthcare Institute Limited is an Indian for-profit private hospital chain headquartered in Delhi. As of June 2025, Max Healthcare operates 22 hospitals, with a total of over 5,000 beds, primarily in North India.

Max Healthcare also operates the Max Lab pathology and Max@Home home medical services divisions.

== History ==
Max Healthcare opened its first medical center in South Delhi's Panchsheel Park in 2000. The company opened two other secondary care centers in Pitampura in North West Delhi and Noida in 2002. In 2004, the company commissioned the East Block of its flagship tertiary care hospital called Max Hospital, Saket in South Delhi.

In 2007, Max Healthcare ventured into Gurgaon with a secondary care hospital.

In 2011, Max Healthcare entered into a public–private partnership (PPP) agreement with the Government of Punjab to set up two hospitals in Mohali and Bathinda. In the same year, Max Healthcare commissioned its tertiary care hospital in Shalimar Bagh, North West Delhi.

In 2012, Life Healthcare Group acquired a 26% stake in Max Healthcare for ₹516 crore (US$96.56 million). In 2014, Life Healthcare invested another ₹766 crore (US$125.51 million) to increase its stake to 46.41% and to become an equal joint venture partner with Max India.

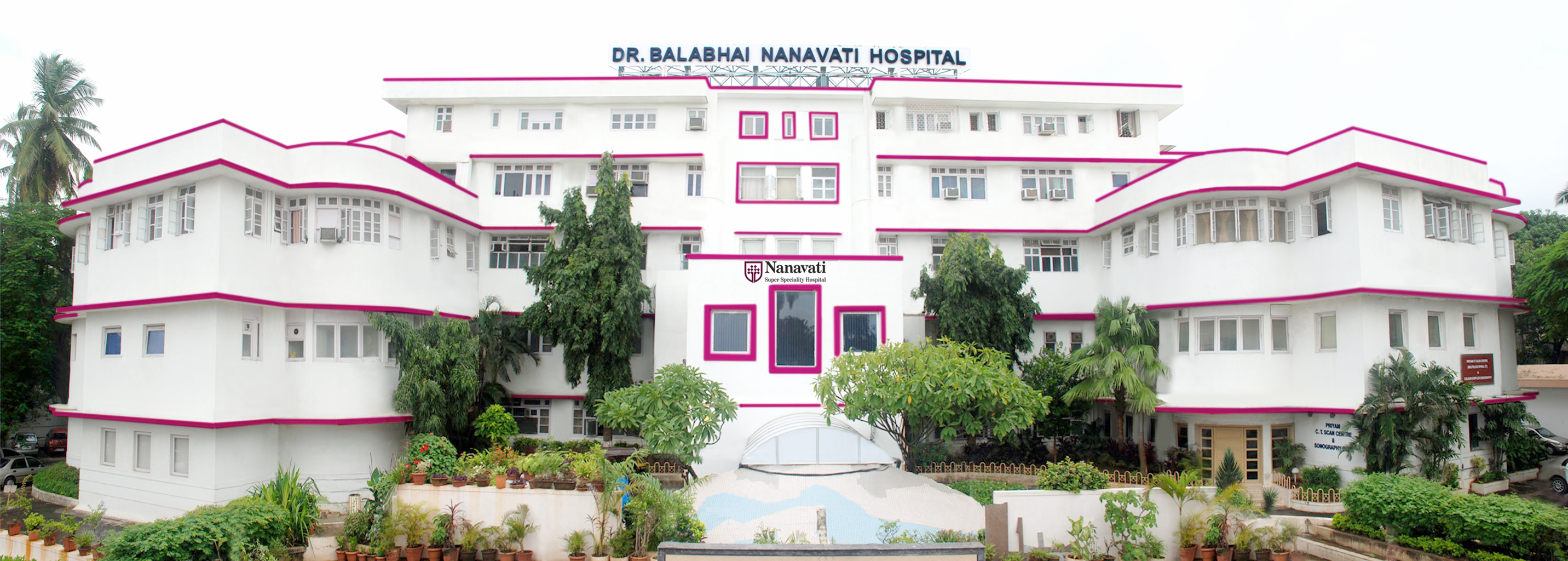
Nanavati Max Super Speciality Hospital in Mumbai

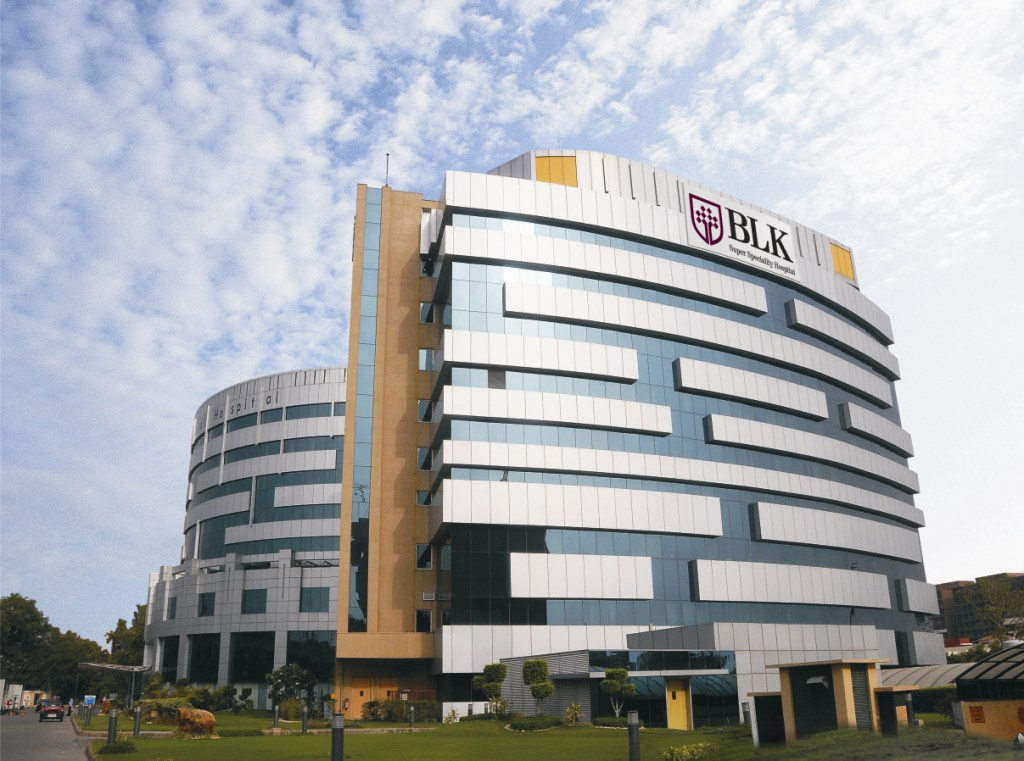
BLK-Max Super Speciality Hospital in Delhi

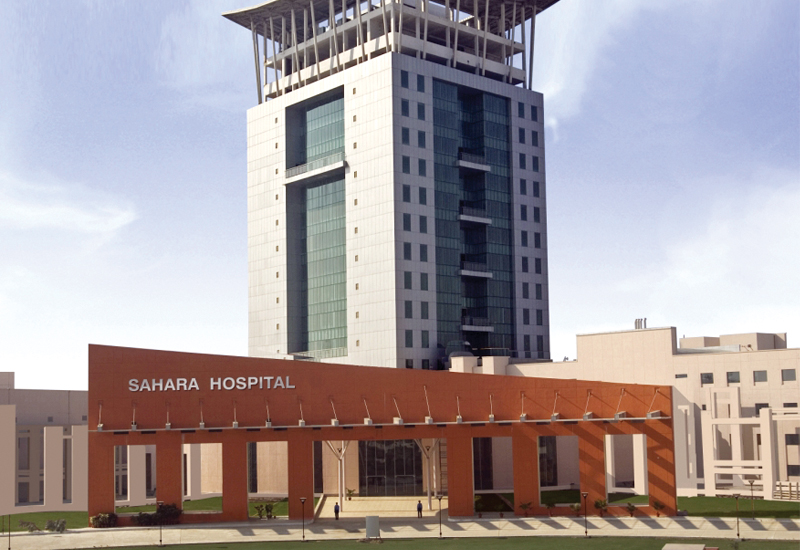
Max Super Speciality Hospital (formerly Sahara Hospital) in Lucknow

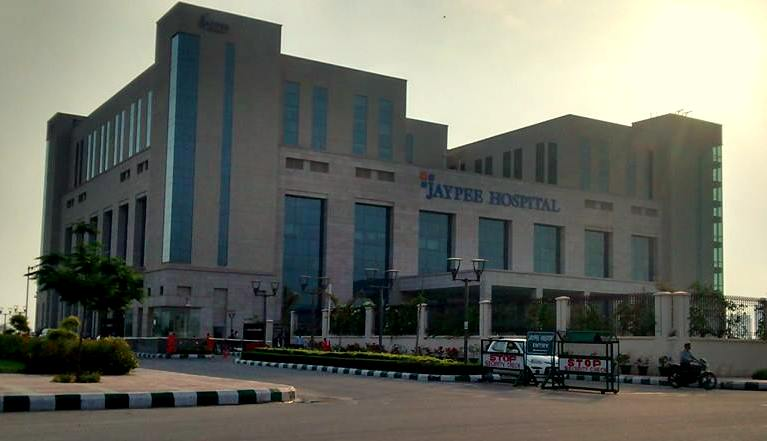
Max Super Speciality Hospital (formerly Jaypee Hospital) in Noida

In 2015, Max Healthcare acquired the Pushpanjali Crosslay Hospital in Vaishali, Ghaziabad, and the Saket City Hospital in Saket. These hospitals were subsequently renamed as Max Hospital Vaishali, and Max Smart Hospital, Saket. A standalone oncology center called Max Cancer Centre was commissioned in Lajpat Nagar, South Delhi, in 2016.

In 2018, Life Healthcare announced that it would sell its entire 49.7% stake in Max Healthcare and exit its joint venture with Max India. In 2019, Radiant Lifecare acquired 49.7% stake in Max Health Institute Limited for ₹2,136 crore (US$303.32 million) and Abhay Soi was made chairman. In 2020, Max Healthcare merged with Radiant Lifecare, which operated BLK Hospital in Central Delhi and the Nanavati Hospital in Mumbai, to become the second-largest healthcare company in India by revenue.

The company listed on the stock exchanges in August 2020. Between 2021 and 2022, co-promoter KKR & Co. Inc. sold its entire stake in Max Healthcare. As a result, Abhay Soi became the sole promoter of the company with over 23% stake.

In 2021, the company obtained the rights to aid the development of a 500-bed hospital in Saket, South Delhi. It secured two land parcels in Gurgaon for two hospitals. The company also executed an O&M agreement to manage the 300-bed Muthoot Hospital in Dwarka, Delhi. In 2022, it acquired a controlling stake in Eqova Healthcare, which had the rights to provide medical services to an upcoming hospital in Patparganj, East Delhi.

In December 2023, Max Healthcare acquired Sahara Hospital in Lucknow for ₹940 crore (US$100 million). In February 2024, it acquired Alexis Multi-Specialty Hospital in Nagpur for ₹412 crore (US$44 million).

In September 2024, Max Healthcare acquired a 64% stake in Jaypee Healthcare at an enterprise value of ₹1,660 crore (US$180 million), gaining control of three hospitals in Noida, Bulandshahr and Anupshahr. In 2025, Max Healthcare sold the hospitals in Anupshahr and Bulandshahr for ₹40 crore (US$4.3 million) as it announced that it would focus on super-specialty hospitals in larger cities.

In April 2026, Max Healthcare acquired a controlling stake of 58% in Kalinga Hospital, Bhubaneswar, for ₹300 crore (US$32 million).

== Education and research ==
Old logo of Max Healthcare when it was part of the Max Group.

Max Institute of Medical Excellence (MIME) has held various training programs across multiple disciplines. Courses offered include a full-time postgraduate Internal Medicine Training (IMT) program in association with the Joint Royal College of Physicians Training Board (JRCPTB), UK. The institute offers a program affiliated with the Lincoln American University, Guyana to train MBBS students and affiliates students for clinical rotation.

== Subsidiaries ==
- Max Lab provides diagnostics and pathology services through its own labs and partner entities. It is the third-largest diagnostics chain in north India.
- Max@Home provides home care, home health nursing, house call and medicine delivery services among others.

== Controversies ==
In September 2013, a patient who had received a pacemaker implantation at Max Super Speciality Hospital, Mohali, died after the doctor allegedly implanted a "wrong and cheap pacemaker". In 2014, the Chief Judicial Magistrate Court (CJM) of Mohali summoned the hospital's CEO and doctor to stand trial against charges of medical negligence, conspiracy and cheating. In 2017, the State Consumer Disputes Redressal Commission ordered the hospital to pay a compensation of ₹32.94 lakh (US$50,582.3) to the wife of the deceased patient. The CJM's summoning order was upheld by the Punjab and Haryana High Court in 2024.

In 2015, the Competition Commission of India (CCI) ordered a probe into Max Super Speciality Hospital, Patparganj, which was allegedly selling disposable syringes to patients at inflated prices. In 2017, the CCI investigation concluded that the hospital was making 275% to 525% profits by forcing patients to buy the products at maximum retail price from its own pharmacy in "a clear instance of abuse of the dominant position". It noted that overcharging was prevalent across all 14 hospitals of Max Group.

In 2016, the Government of Delhi ordered five hospitals in the city, including Max Super Speciality Hospital, Saket, to pay a total fine of ₹600 crore (US$89.29 million) for denying free-of-cost treatment to the poor. The government stated that the five hospitals were granted land at concessional rates on the condition that they provide free medical treatment to poor people totalling to 10% of all in-patients and 25% of all outpatients, but they had failed to comply with the condition.

In December 2017, the Government of Delhi suspended the license of Max Super Speciality Hospital, Shalimar Bagh, which had wrongly declared a preterm baby dead that was later found to be alive. Delhi Health Minister Satyendar Jain labelled the hospital as a "habitual offender" and said that three notices had been served to the hospital earlier over medical lapses. The hospital resumed operations later that month after the license suspension was stayed.

During the outbreak of COVID-19 in 2020, Max Super Speciality Hospital, Patparganj, received criticism for its high treatment costs. The hospital issued a statement that charges of over ₹1 lakh (US$1,349.53) per day was applicable only for "very critical COVID-19 patients".
