= Praja Bhavan =

Government building in Hyderabad, India

- Interactive map of the Praja Bhavan area

General information
- Architectural style: Neoclassical, Palladian
- Location: Greenlands Road, Begumpet; Hyderabad 500 082; Telangana, India
- Current tenants: Anumula Revanth Reddy
- Construction started: March 2016
- Completed: 23 November 2016 (9 years ago)
- Cost: INR ₹38 crore (US$5.4 million)
- Client: Government of Telangana

Technical details
- Size: 9 acres (3.6 ha)
- Floor area: 100,000 sq ft (9,300 m^{2})

Design and construction
- Architects: NA Architects; N.Niroop Kumar Reddy
- Engineer: Shapoorji Pallonji

The Praja Bhavan, officially known as Jyotirao Phule Praja Bhavan and formerly known as Pragathi Bhavan is the official residence and principal workplace of the Chief Minister of Telangana. It is located at Greenlands Road, Punjagutta, Hyderabad in Telangana. It was built in 2016 under the chief ministership of K. Chandrashekar Rao. It was designed by the Indian architect, N. Niroop Kumar Reddy.

On 7 December 2023, Revanth Reddy took oath as the Chief Minister of Telangana making him the second person to hold the post. (Note: He is the 2nd person to serve as CM, while being the 3rd CM.) On the day of his swearing-in, he renamed Pragathi Bhavan as Praja Bhavan meaning people's building. He ordered the removal of iron barricades at the entrance. He conducted a "Praja Darbar" at this place where he met with people about their grievances on 8 December 2023, reflecting the promise of people's government. He announced renaming the program as "Praja Vani" which will be held on Tuesday and Friday from 10 AM to 1 PM.

== History ==
Chief Minister's Camp Office, used as residence cum camp office of Chief minister from 2005, was considered inauspicious by K. Chandrashekar Rao, when he became chief minister in 2014. He conceived the idea of a new complex adjacent to the camp office to help perform his duties without interruption. 10 IAS Officers quarters and 24 peon quarters at officers’ colony were demolished to construct the new complex. The residential area of camp office is now used as the state guest house and the office area is now the Office of Inspector General (intelligence).

The original official name was Pragathi Bhavan which means "Progress building". The Gruhapravesam (housewarming) was performed on 23 November 2016 at 5.22 AM by Former Chief Minister of Telangana, K. Chandrashekar Rao, with traditional rituals performed by Chinna Jeeyar Swamy.

== Design ==
Designed by noted Indian architect, Hafeez Contractor. It has classical inspiration sources, found in neoclassical & Palladian style. The building design cues are found in historical buildings in erstwhile princely State of Hyderabad like the Koti Residency and Falaknuma Palace.

Suddala Sudhakar Teja was the vaastu consultant for the entire complex.

=== Architecture ===
The front facade is a columned portico. The columns are on the periphery, giving large, unhindered, open-spaced halls and rooms

== Construction ==
Construction was started in March 2016, without a formal event, and completed in November 2016, in a record time of nine months. The entire complex was constructed by Mumbai-based construction company, Shapoorji Pallonji, at a cost of INR ₹38 crore (US$5.4 million) . The construction work was expedited with 200 workers, working day and night at the site.

== Layout ==
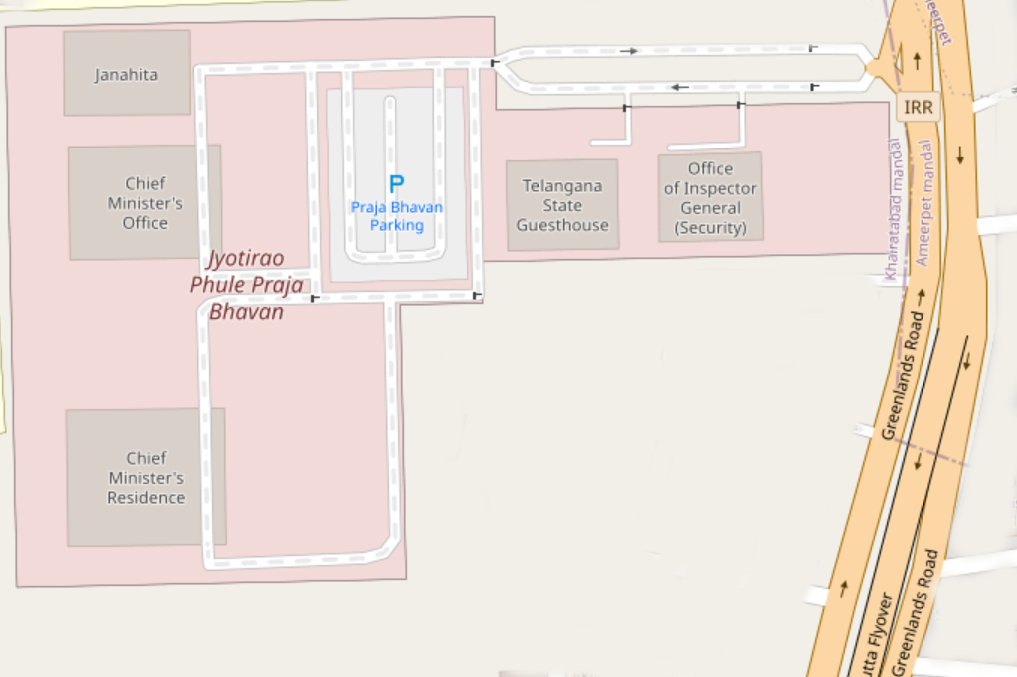
Sketch of Jyotirao Phule Praja Bhavan from OpenStreetMap

The east-facing building complex has a combined built-up area of over 1,00,000 sq ft, on a land area of 9 acres (3.64 hectares). The entry point into the new complex is on the north east corner. There is a small Maisamma temple inside, the decades-old temple too was rebuilt in a new location. The five buildings – the residence, Chief Ministers Office, Janahitha (meeting hall), Telangana State Guesthouse and Office of Inspector General(Security). The residence occupies bigger area. The office and Janahitha are located adjacent, to the north of the residence.

=== Residence ===
The residence is on a rectangular-shaped plot with two floors, and built on an acre of land, with floor area of 40,000 square feet. It has a theater-cum-auditorium with a capacity to seat 250 people. There is home garden on an acre land, planted with ayurvedic and other trees on the periphery adjacent to the residence.

=== Chief Minister’s Office (CMO) ===
The two storied Telangana CMO building is the official secretariat of the Chief Minister of Telangana. Earlier, the CMO known as the CM Peshi was located on the 6th floor of C Block in the Telangana Secretariat was facing space crunch. This is the heart of state administration.

The CMO has a mini conference hall, a hall for video conferences and has hotline connections to all main offices in every mandal headquarters. The offices include chambers for Chief Minister, secretaries and administrative staff.

=== Janahitha ===
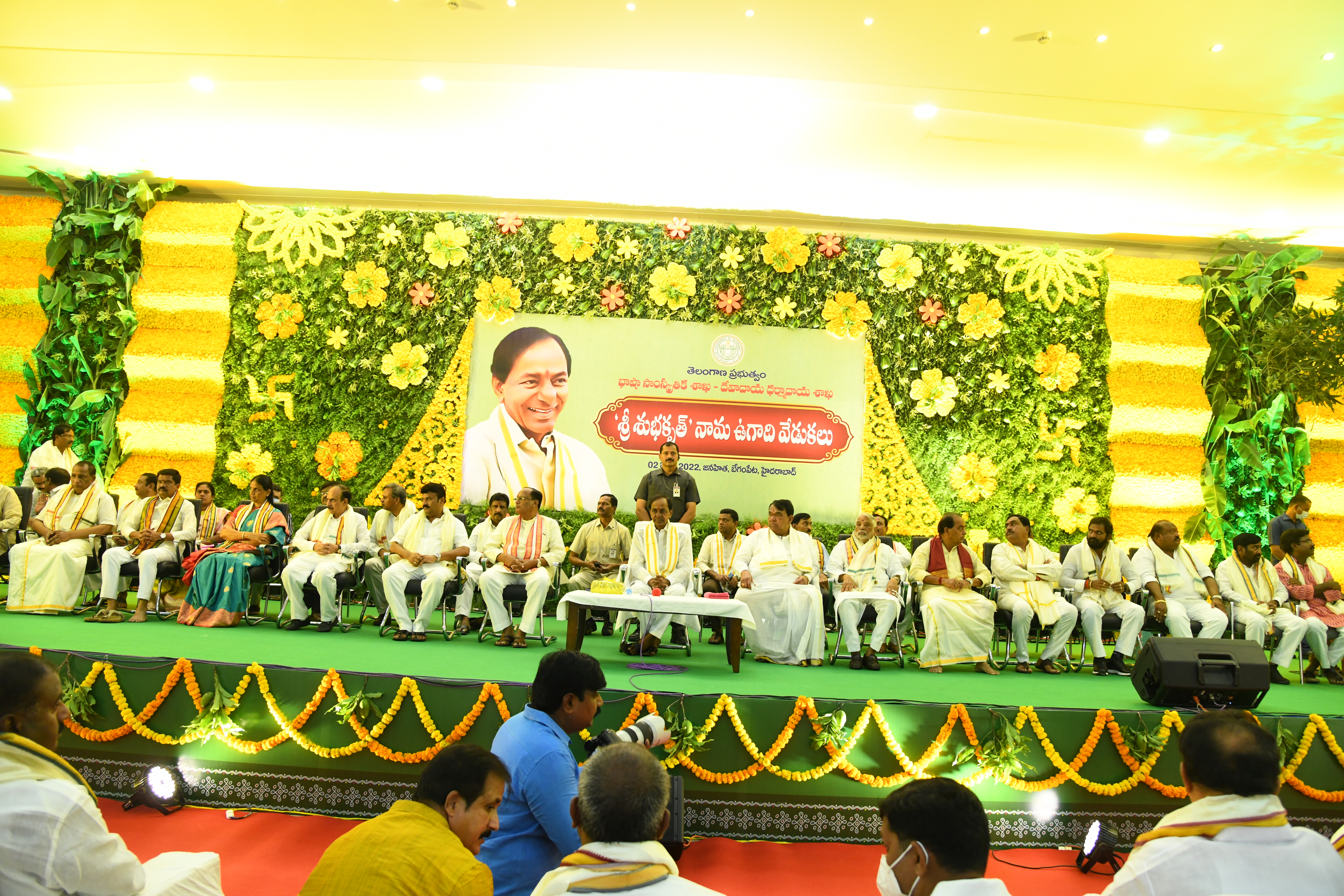
2022 Ugadi Celebrations at Janahitha

Janahitha is a large public meeting hall, with a capacity to accommodate over 1000 people. It was inaugurated on 17 February 2017, on the birthday of the then Telangana CM, KCR. It is single-floor building, with a floor-to-ceiling height of 24 feet, with a floor area of 15,000 sq ft. It was named as Janahitha, meaning good for the people. It is modeled on the lines of Mughal emperor, Akbar's People’s court, Diwan-i-Aam, where he met with his courtiers and subjects to discuss their issues.

The Chief Minister holds important policy meetings with secretaries, collectors, official review meetings and meetings with public representatives. It is also used to interact with citizens of the state like farmers, workers, employees, artisans etc. It also has a large lounge area, used by the CM for interacting with daily visitors.

== Security ==
The tightly monitored zone has compound walls 15-feet high, electric fence. The ventilators and windows have bulletproof glass and CCTVs which are monitored by 55 security personnel round the clock. The complex has a parking facility for over 300 cars.

== Officials in Jyothirao Phule Praja Bhavan ==
- Kalvakuntla Chandrashekhar Rao - 23 November 2016 – 6 December 2023
- Mallu Bhatti Vikramarka (Deputy chief minister) - 7 December 2023 – present

== See also ==
- List of official residences of India
