= Uthama Puthiran =

Uthama Puthiran (or Uthamaputhiran) may refer to:

- Uthama Puthiran (1940 film), a 1940 Indian Tamil-language film
- Uthama Puthiran (1958 film), a 1958 Indian Tamil-language film
- Uthamaputhiran (2010 film), a 2010 Indian Tamil-language film

== See also ==
- Uthaman (disambiguation)
