= Palayam =

Palayam may refer to:

- Palayam (film), a 1994 Indian Malayalam-language film
- Palayam, Kanyakumari, a village in Neyyoor town panchayat, Kanyakumari district, Tamil Nadu, India
- Palayam, Perambalur, a village in Perambalur district, Tamil Nadu, India
- Palayam, Thiruvananthapuram, a suburb of Thiruvananthapuram, Kerala, India
- Palayam, Dindigul district a town panchayat in Dindigul district, Tamil Nadu, India

== See also ==
- Polygar, former administrators in India of districts known as palayams
