= Vinod Kannan =

Indian businessman

- Education: National University of Singapore; University of California, Los Angeles; Nanyang Technological University
- Known for: CEO of Vistara airline

Vinod Kannan is an Indian businessman. He was the CEO of Vistara Airlines, until it merged with Air India in 2024.

== Early life and education ==
Kannan grew up in Bangalore and left for Singapore to do his degree in Electronic Engineering at Nanyang Technological University after which he joined Singapore Airlines. He later did a master's degree in Business Administration from the National University of Singapore and University of California, Los Angeles.

== Career ==
Kannan had worked with Singapore Airlines (SIA) for over twenty years. In June 2019, he joined Vistara as the Chief Strategy Officer. In January 2020, he became the Chief Commercial Officer of Vistara. In January 2022, he became the chief executive officer of Vistara.
