= P. K. Sen (surgeon) =

Indian vascular and cardiothoracic surgeon (1915–1982)

Prafulla Kumar Sen
- Born: 7 December 1915; Calcutta, British India
- Died: 22 July 1982 (aged 66); Calcutta, India
- Education: University of Bombay
- Occupation: Cardiothoracic surgeon
- Known for: Conducting the first human heart transplant in India (1968)
- Relatives: Marie Barnes
- Medical career
- Institutions: King Edward Memorial Hospital and Seth Gordhandas Sunderdas Medical College
- Sub-specialties: Transplant surgery
- Awards: Padma Bhushan

Prafulla Kumar Sen MD (7 December 1915 – 22 July 1982) was an Indian vascular and cardiothoracic surgeon, who led the world's sixth attempt of human heart transplant and India's first in 1968. It dubbed him the fourth surgeon in the world to carry out this operation.

Sen was active in establishing postgraduate programmes in surgical training and one of the early surgeons to perform aortic surgery in India in the 1950s. After being the first in India to perform a closed mitral valvotomy in 1952, within a year he repaired a coarctation of the aorta and by 1956 he had successfully attempted the first direct vision closure of an atrial septal defect. In the 1950s he turned his attention from aortic surgery to open heart surgery following numerous experiments on dogs. He subsequently led teams that performed two heart transplants in Bombay in 1968. Both recipients died on the day of their operation.

Sen was, in addition, a poet and painter. His paintings were displayed once in the United States, and twice in India.

== Early life and education ==
Prafulla Kumar Sen, popularly known as P. K. Sen, was born on 7 December 1915 in Calcutta, British India. He had one sister and his father was a civil servant.

He began his early education at a public school in Jamtada, Bihar, before attending the Victoria College of Sciences, Nagpur. Subsequently, Sen gained admission to medicine at the G.S. Medical College, Bombay, where he studied between 1933 and 1938, before passing his MBBS. In 1940, he achieved a distinction in his master of surgery (MS) degree at the University of Bombay.

== Surgical career ==
Sen's internships and surgical training were completed at King Edward VII Memorial Hospital (KEM), Bombay between 1938 and 1943, after which he returned to G.S. Medical College as assistant honorary surgeon. Initially, he received aid from the Indian Council for Medical Research (ICMR). He was frequently in dispute with the Bombay Municipal Corporation who were more concerned with providing for diseases of poverty and over population. However, he was ambitious, a "buccaneer" and had a wish to extend Indian medicine into the rapidly growing and exciting arena of open heart surgery. He was inspired by Charaka but also paid tribute to Western medical pioneers including John Hunter and Alexis Carrel.

=== Pennsylvania ===
In 1949, following an application for a Rockefeller Foundation fellowship and the subsequent endorsement by Isidor Schwaner Ravdin, chair of surgery at the University of Pennsylvania at their request, Sen travelled to the University of Pennsylvania in the United States to work for six months with thoracic surgeon James Hardy. Their research on the "impact of surgery on adrenocortical activity" was presented at the American College of Surgeons in Boston in October 1950 and later, amidst the backdrop of racial unrest in the U.S. and an incident in which Sen was nearly barred from a hotel, at the American Physiological Society in Atlanta. Before returning to India in 1952, Sen visited surgical research centres all over the United States including Minneapolis, New York and Baltimore. In addition, he visited London and Sweden. Over the next fifteen years, he obtained another two travel fellowships to the U.S., with assistance from the Rockefeller foundation.

=== Return to India ===
In 1952, he was appointed to KEM Hospital as honorary surgeon, but soon left to take up the post of director professor of surgery at G.S. Medical College, the post he held until his retirement in 1973.

He initially worked in experimental and clinical research, but was later active in establishing postgraduate qualifications in cardiothoracic surgery during a period in which he also founded specialist departments at G.S. Medical college and the KEM Hospital, including gastrointestinal and hepatic surgery, sports medicine and oncology.

=== Early cardiovascular surgery ===
In addition to North American networks, Rockefeller support and funding, and the ICMR, Sen was also influenced by Soviet surgeons, particularly Vladimir Demikhov. Along with other KEM Hospital cardiothoracic surgeons including M. D. Kelkar, G. B. Parulkar who established the technique of hypothermic circulatory arrest in resection of aortic aneurysm and T. P.Kulkarni who described tuberculous aortitis, Sen was one of the first to perform aortic surgery in the 1950s, laying the foundations at first for aortic surgery and then later open heart surgery in India.

In 1952, following the adaptation of American techniques and after 25 dog experiments, he successfully performed the first intra-cardiac procedure in India by pushing his finger through a rheumatic mitral valve (closed mitral valvotomy) via a cut made in the right atrium of a beating heart. In 1953, he repaired a coarctation of the aorta and by 1956 he had successfully attempted the first direct vision closure of an atrial septal defect under hypothermia and inflow occlusion. Around the same time, he initiated other vascular repair procedures on the Aorta for the surgical treatment of Aortitis and Aortic aneurysms.

By 1957, Sen had completed his second travel fellowship and tour of major North American and European cardiac centres. In addition, on his return to India, he hosted foreign delegates, one of whom was William Heneage Ogilvie (of Ogilvie syndrome), in early 1958.

He was at first skeptical of heart-lung machines and concentrated chiefly on hypothermia in his transplant surgery, but by the early 1960s he had secured Rockefeller funding to train a group of Indian surgeons and scientists in surgery using heart-lung machines. In 1962 following the death of a child whilst repairing a ventricular septal defect with the assistance of a heart- lung machine, Sen made his third and final overseas Rockefeller tour which included Japan, Mexico, much of the U.S. and the United Kingdom. He concluded in Moscow with a visit to Demikhov, who had recently achieved fame with his dog heart and head transplants. This came at a time when the Indian government was "actively cultivating ties to the Soviet Union".

=== First Indian human heart transplant ===
Sen and his team tested their techniques on hundreds of dogs between 1962 and 1964. In 1965, three out of five dogs who underwent cardiopulmonary transplants were able to breathe after surgery without artificial ventilation. All the dogs had survivals from 5 to 12 hours.

James Hardy, who had previously supervised Sen on his first fellowship at Pennsylvania in 1950, had by 1964 transplanted a chimpanzee heart into a human. Two years later, Hardy visited Bombay and spoke at G.S. Medical College about transplants.

On 16 February 1968, Sen led the team that performed the first human heart transplant in India, and only the sixth in the world. He was the fourth surgeon in the world to attempt this, the previous three surgeons being Christiaan Barnard, Norman Shumway and Adrian Kantrowitz. The recipient was a male farmer with severe progressive cardiomyopathy who had been admitted to hospital in the previous six months. It took one month from the decision to transplant to find a donor. The patient was to be given the heart of a 20 year old Maharashtrian woman who had sustained severe head injuries after falling from a train. The operation began just after midnight on 17 February 1968. The farmer died from heart failure within three hours of the operation. The operation was not publicised as widely as previous heart transplants, particularly those of Barnard and Shumway. With less media coverage than numerous other early heart transplants, Sen's heart transplant in February 1968, was before any in Europe, Canada, Australia, Japan or the Soviet Union.

Sen believed India had a vast potential as a transplant centre with a wealth of donor organs resulting from accidents on its disordered roads and railways.

On 13 September 1968, he performed the second human heart transplant in India. The donor was a 25 year old road traffic accident victim and the recipient, a youth. Severe pulmonary hypertension developed within a few hours of the operation and the recipient died within 14 hours. No further attempts at heart transplants were made in India until Panangipalli Venugopal led the first successful heart transplant in India, at the All India Institute of Medical Sciences (AIIMS) in Delhi in 1994 and after new laws had been passed relating to "brain death". KEM did not carry out any further heart transplants until 2015.

=== 1970s ===
Sen's contributions to the procedure of myocardial acupuncture in ischaemic heart disease were followed by developments in aortic arch replacement. His students included Sharad Panday, M. S. Valiathan and S. I. Padmavati and he maintained contact with heart surgeons outside India such as William Bigelow, Denton Cooley, Donald Ross, Norman Shumway and Demikhov.

=== Calcutta Hospital and Research Centre ===
From 1977, Sen practiced as a consultant cardiovascular and thoracic surgeon at Calcutta Hospital and Research Centre, where he remained until his death in 1982.

Sen received the Indian Padma Bhushan award.

== Personal life ==
In 1950, Sen met Marie Barnes, an American physiologist from Philadelphia, while training there. They married in 1954. They had no children.

He painted and wrote poetry. His paintings were displayed at one time in the United States, and twice in India.

== Death and legacy ==
Sen died on 22 July 1982 from a heart attack. The department of cardiothoracic surgery at KEM was founded by him and now bears his name. As a past president of the Association of Surgeons of India, the "Dr P. K. Sen memorial oration" was established in his honour in 1993 by the Indian Association of Cardiovascular-Thoracic Surgeons.

== Selected publications ==
- Sen, PK; Kinare, SG; Engineer, SD; Parulkar, GB (1963). "The middle aortic syndrome". Br Heart J. 25 (5): 610–8. doi:10.1136/hrt.25.5.610. PMC 1018042. PMID 14063008.
- Sen, PK; Parulkar, GB; Panday, SR; Kinare, SG (1965). "Homologous canine heart transplantation: a preliminary report of 100 experiments". Indian J Med Res. 53 (7): 674–84. PMID 5318259.
- Sen, Prufalla K. (1968). "Human heart homotransplantation∗". The American Journal of Cardiology. 22 (6): 826–832. doi:10.1016/0002-9149(68)90178-1. PMID 4880227..
- Sen, PK; Udwadia, TE; Kinare, SG; Parulkar, GB (1965). "Transmyocardial acupuncture: A new approach to myocardial revascularization". J Thorac Cardiovasc Surg. 50 (2): 181–9. doi:10.1016/s0022-5223(19)33205-2. PMID 14321516.
