= Telangana State Guesthouse =

Government building in Hyderabad, India

State Guesthouse (Telangana)
- Interactive map of the State Guesthouse (Telangana) area

General information
- Location: Hyderabad, Telangana, India
- Coordinates: 17.4317°N 78.4548°E
- Construction started: 2004
- Cost: ₹8.1 crores
- Client: State of Telangana

Technical details
- Size: 2 acres (0.8 ha)
- Floor area: 25,500 Square foot

Telangana State Guesthouse, formerly residential part of Chief Minister's Camp Office, is a state guest house of the State Government of Telangana, India. The camp office's office is converted to the Office of the Inspector General (security). The building is now part of Praja Bhavan, the official residence of the Chief Minister of Telangana. It is located in Greenlands circle, Begumpet.

== History ==
It was formerly the official residence of the Chief Minister of Telangana and before bifurcation the official residence of Chief Minister of Andhra Pradesh (United). The camp office was built in 2004 after the Congress party came into power as the official residence of the Chief Minister of Andhra Pradesh. The first Chief Minister to move in was Y. S. Rajasekhara Reddy in 2005 and stayed in it for five years, until his death in 2009.

== The Camp Office ==
The CM Camp Office has office and residence on the two-storied premises. The land area is over 2-acre (8,100 m^{2}) with a built up area of 25,500 Square foot. It has roads on both east and north directions. It was built as per Vaastu principles.

A theater was built on the premises in 2007 at a cost of ₹1.15 crore, 2,500 square feet (230 m^{2}) and has state of the art recording and online editing equipment.

== Chief Ministers in residence ==
- Y. S. Rajasekhara Reddy – 2005–2009
- Konijeti Rosiah after sworn in as Chief Minister, never resided but used as office
- Nallari Kiran Kumar Reddy – 2010–2014.
- Kalvakuntla Chandrashekar Rao – June 2014 – November 2016

== Post bifurcation ==
Following the creation of the state of Telangana, the Camp Office became the residence of the Chief Minister of Telangana, with the Chief Minister of the residual Andhra Pradesh taking up residence at the Lakeview Guest House.

- K Chandrashekhar Rao – 22 June 2014 – 2015

== Present ==
Presently it is used as a guest house by the Chief Minister of Telangana.

== See also ==
- Praja Bhavan
