= Uttamchand K. Sheth =

Uttamchand Khimchand Sheth
- Born: 29 October 1920; Mumbai, Maharashtra, India
- Died: 29 July 2000 (aged 79); Mumbai, Maharashtra, India
- Education: King Edward Memorial Hospital and Seth Gordhandas Sunderdas Medical College
- Known for: Pharmacological studies and medical education
- Awards: 1968 Shanti Swarup Bhatnagar Prize; 1971 Amrit Mody Award; 1978 B. C. Roy Award
- Scientific career
- Fields: Clinical pharmacology
- Workplaces: Topiwala National Medical College; King Edward Memorial Hospital and Seth Gordhandas Sunderdas Medical College

Uttamchand Khimchand Sheth (1920–2000) was an Indian clinical pharmacologist and the director of King Edward Memorial Hospital and Seth Gordhandas Sunderdas Medical College.

== Life ==
Sheth was born on 29 October 1920 in Mumbai in Maharastra, he was known for his pharmacological studies and contributions in promoting medical education in pharmacology.

Sheth, Bimal Kumar Bachhawat and Nilima Arun Kshirsagar are credited with creating with creating the research and academic structure for teaching pharmacology in India.

He was the author of a book on pharmacology, Selected Topics in Experimental Pharmacology. The Council of Scientific and Industrial Research, the apex agency of the Government of India for scientific research, awarded him the Shanti Swarup Bhatnagar Prize for Science and Technology, one of the highest Indian science awards, for his contributions to Medical Sciences in 1967. He was also a recipient of Amrut Mody Award (1971) and B. C. Roy Award, the highest Indian medical award, which he received in 1978. An elected fellow of the National Academy of Medical Sciences, he died on 29 July 2000, at the age of 79.
