= Keshavrao Krishnarao Datey =

Indian cardiologist

Keshavrao Krishnrao Datey
- Born: 7 August 1912; Jabalpur
- Died: 22 April 1983 (aged 70)
- Education: M.B.B.S. (1936), M.R.C.P. (1949), M.D. (1950), F.R.C.P. (1967)
- Known for: Cardiology

Keshavrao Krishnarao Datey (7 August 1912 – 22 April 1983) was a pioneer of Indian cardiology. He was a director of the department of cardiology at KEM Hospital, Mumbai. He was also a founding director of the All India Heart Foundation, and a Fellow of the Royal College of Physicians.

== Biography ==
Datey was born in Jabalpur to Krishnaji Hari Datey, an engineer, and Annapurna bai. He did his schooling from Model High School, Jabalpur, and later joined Ewing Christian College at Allahabad.

Thereafter, he studied medicine at the Seth G.S.Medical College (1936), then affiliated with University of Bombay. He received his first MRCP from University of Edinburgh in 1947 and MRCP from University of London in 1949.

He was awarded the Padma Bhushan, the third highest civilian honour of India by the president of India in 1969.
