= 23 Marina =

88-story, 392.8 m (1,289 ft) residential skyscraper in Dubai, United Arab Emirates

- Location within United Arab Emirates

General information
- Status: Completed
- Type: Residential
- Location: A-23-D, Plot No. 392-568, Al Marsa, Dubai Marina, UAE
- Coordinates: 25°05′23.30″N 55°09′02.28″E
- Construction started: 3 October 2006
- Completed: 24 May 2012
- Owner: Hircon International

Height
- Architectural: 392.8 m (1,289 ft)
- Roof: 395 m (1,296 ft)
- Top floor: 313.5 m (1,029 ft)

Technical details
- Floor count: 89; 4 below ground
- Floor area: 139,544 m^{2} (1,502,039 sq ft)
- Lifts/elevators: 62

Design and construction
- Architects: Hafeez Contractor; KEO International Consultants
- Developer: Hiranandani Group; ETA Star Group
- Engineer: KEO International Consultants
- Main contractor: Dubai Civil Engineering

Other information
- Number of units: 289

23 Marina is an 88-story, 392.8 m (1,289 ft) residential skyscraper in Dubai, United Arab Emirates. As of 2022, it is the fourth tallest building in Dubai and the sixth tallest residential building in the world.

The tower has 57 swimming pools and each duplex in the tower is equipped with its own private elevator.

The building was 79 percent sold before construction started. The raft was completed on 30 April 2007.

In 2026, the tower was struck and damaged by Iran during its strikes against the United Arab Emirates.

== Construction gallery ==
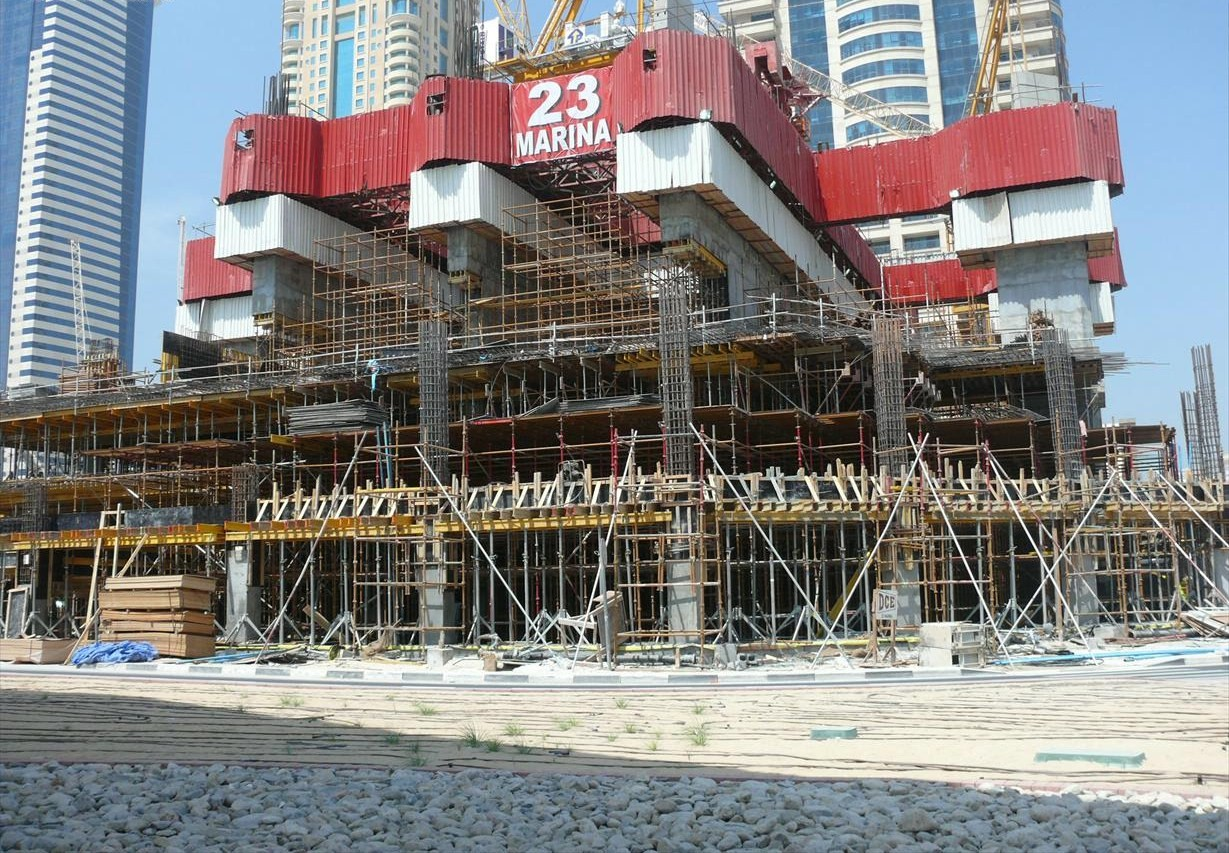
21 September 2007

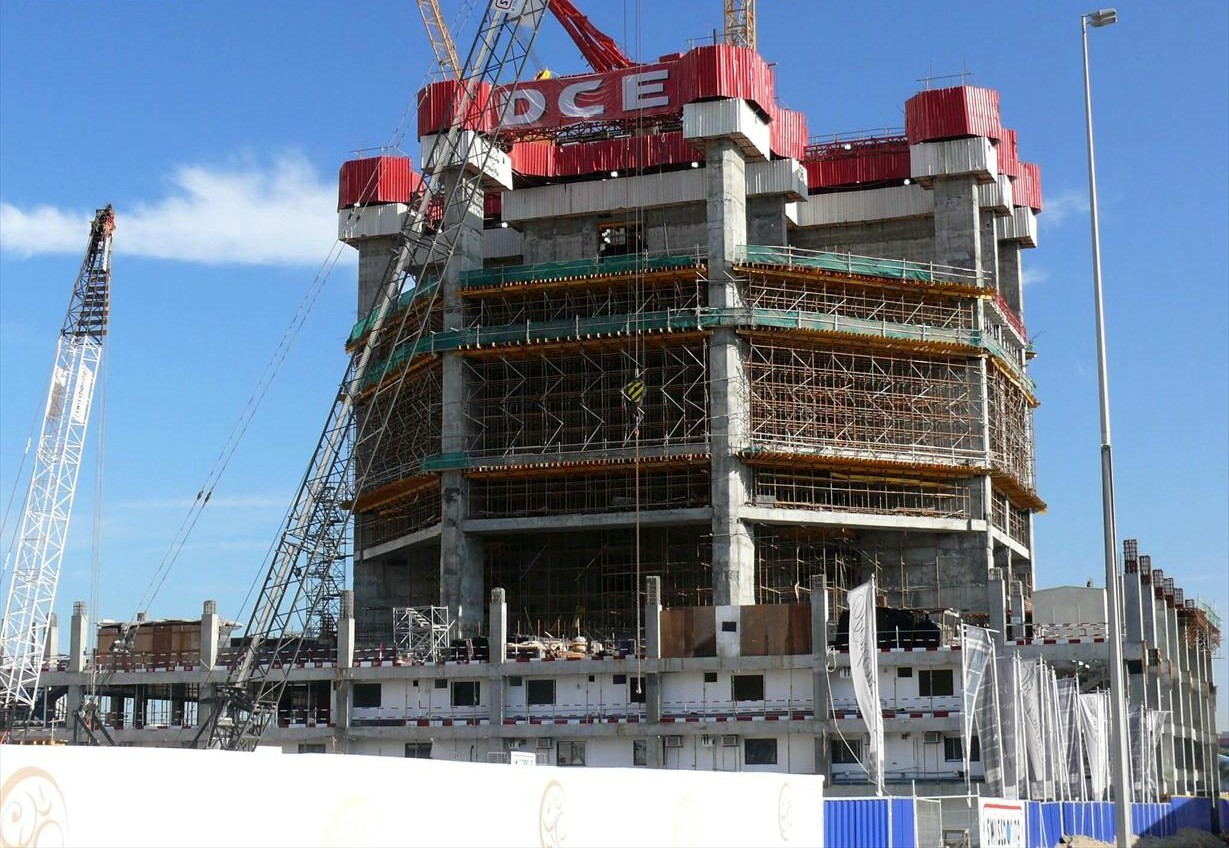
18 January 2008

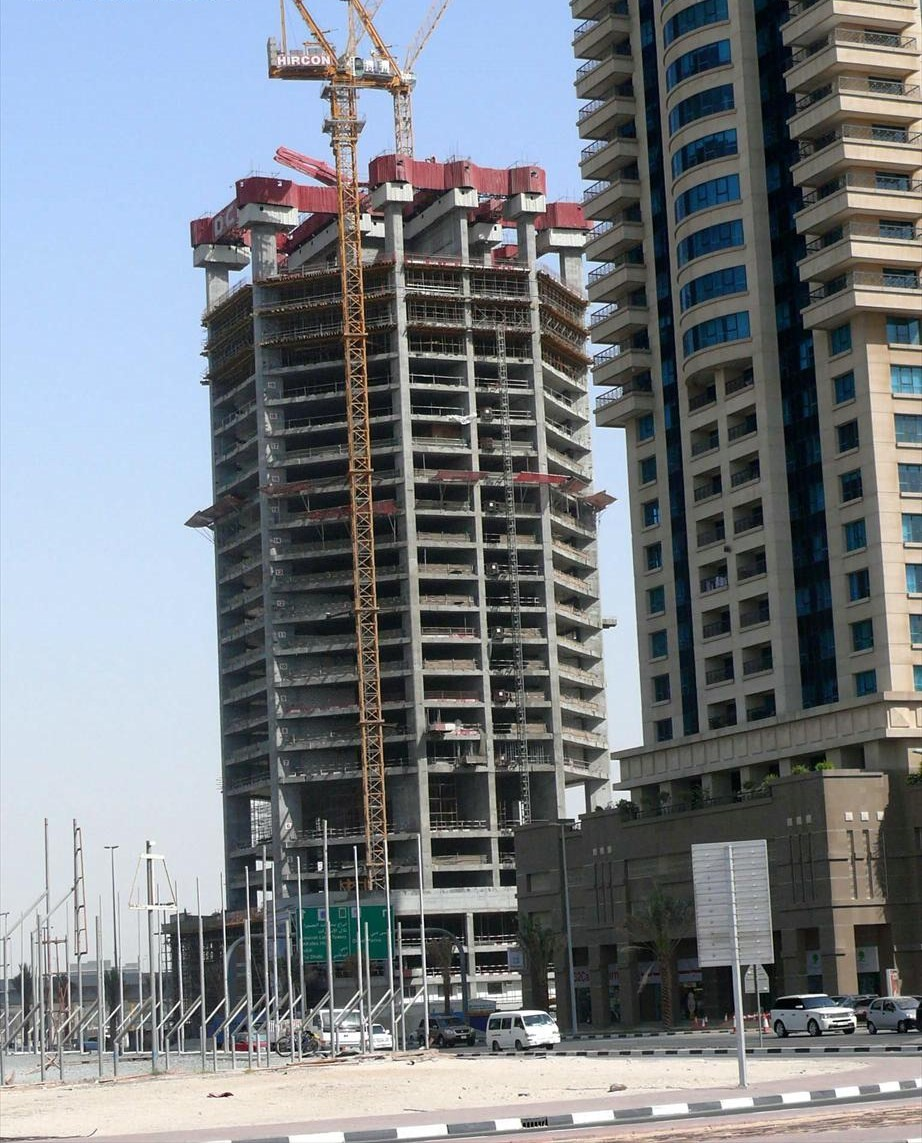
13 June 2008

== See also ==
- Dubai Marina
- List of tallest buildings in Dubai
- List of tallest buildings in the United Arab Emirates
