= Hafeez Contractor =

Indian architect (born 1950)

Hafeez Sorab Contractor
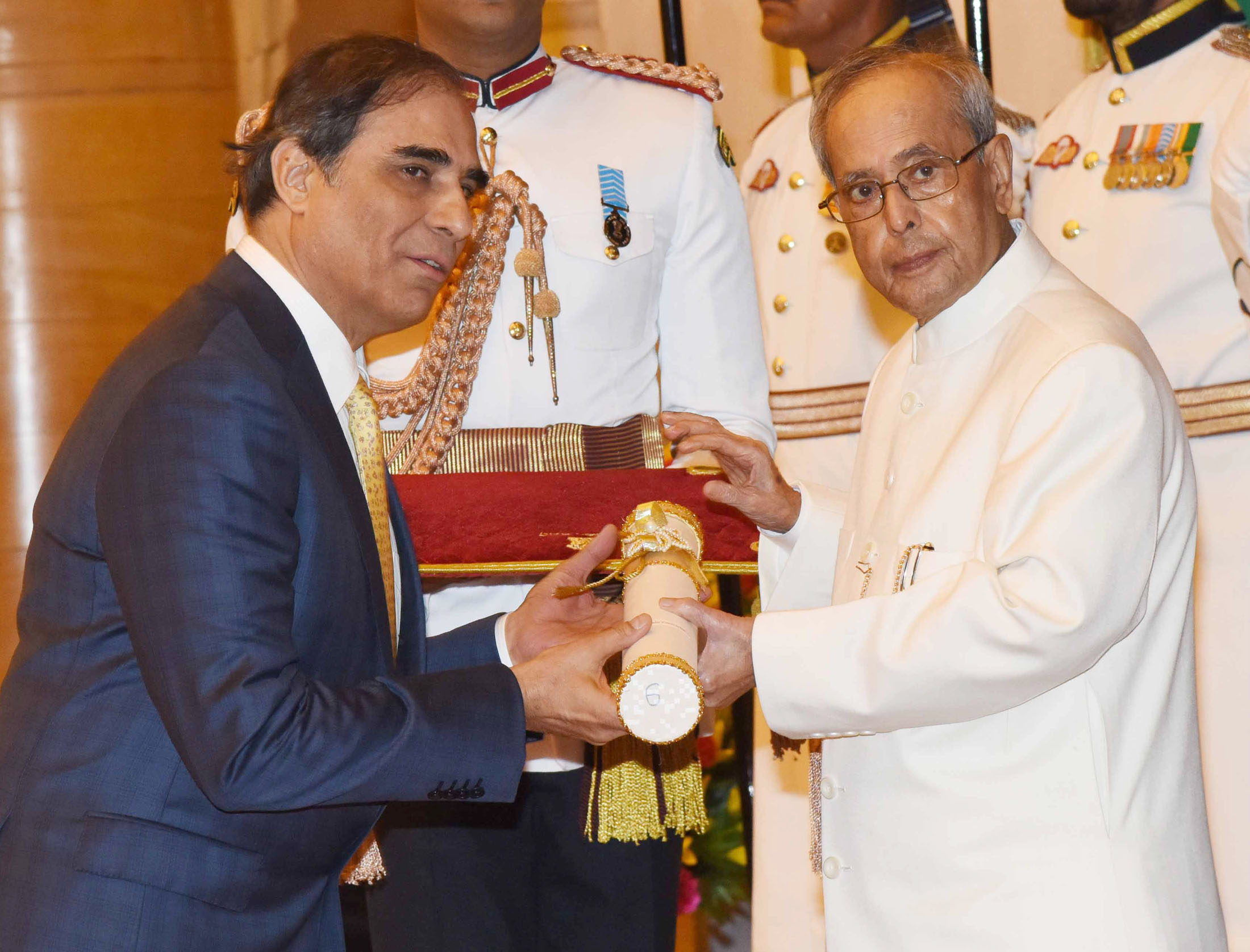
- Hafeez Contractor (left) in 2016
- Born: 19 June 1950 (age 76); Mumbai, Maharashtra, India
- Education: University of Mumbai; Columbia University
- Occupation: Architect
- Spouse: Pearl Contractor (m. 1962)
- Children: Zoish Contractor; Yaazd Contractor
- Parent(s): Sorab Contractor; Roshan Contractor
- Awards: Padma Bhushan
- Practice: Architect Hafeez Contractor
- Buildings: 23 Marina; The Imperial; BITS Goa; BITS Hyderabad; Infosys Training Centre; The 42; Delhi Airport Terminal 1; DY Patil Stadium
- Website: www.hafeezcontractor.com

Hafeez Sorab Contractor (born 1950) is an Indian architect and the founder of Architect Hafeez Contractor, one of India's largest architectural practices. Closely associated with the transformation of India's built fabric post liberalization, his practice spans residential, commercial, hospitality, IT campuses, civic infrastructure, airports, stadiums and mass housing. He is considered among the country's most prolific high rise architects, and has designed many skyscrapers in India, primarily in the city of Mumbai. He is the architect of some of the tallest buildings the country, including The 42 in Kolkata, The Imperial in Mumbai, and the Minerva Tower, also in Mumbai. His firm has also designed the National Maritime Heritage Complex, Lothal, Gujarat, a project currently under construction, and set to be one of India's key tourism destinations. He was awarded the Padma Bhushan in January 2016 by the Government of India, one of India's highest civilian awards.

== Early life ==
Hafeez Contractor was born in Mumbai on 19 June 1950 into a Parsi family. He attended Boys' Town Public School in Nashik before moving on to the University of Mumbai's Academy of Architecture in 1975. While in his undergraduate course, his work often filled entire classrooms, where unique and bold designs were expressed through detailed drawings and models. At the end of his five-year course, in 1975, he was invited to exhibit his college work in a one-man-show at the Jehangir Art Gallery, Mumbai, cosponsored by the Academy of Architecture and the J.J College of Architecture. He then won a scholarship to Columbia University, where he completed his master's degree in 1977.

== Career ==
While pursuing his architecture degree, Contractor began working in 1968 as an apprentice under the supervision of his uncle and mentor Tehmasp Khareghat. He joined his uncle's company T. Khareghat in 1977 as an associate partner.

In 1991, Contractor was enlisted to add buildings to Infosys' Bangalore campus. He went on to design that firm's first software-development park outside Pune, and its corporate educational facility near Mysore. His most famous project is Hiranandani Gardens, a township in Powai, a suburb of Mumbai. In 2005, Contractor designed the twin-tower residential skyscraper, The Imperial, whose 254-metre-tall (833 ft) Tower I became the tallest residential buildings in India (with Tower II slightly behind) upon completion in 2010 – a distinction it held until it was displaced by One Avighna Park (266 metre) in 2017. That building was, in turn, displaced by The 42 in Kolkata, which was also designed by Contractor and architecturally topped out at 260m. He also designed 23 Marina in Dubai, which was briefly the world's tallest all-residential building, and is currently third behind the nearby Princess Tower and 432 Park Avenue in New York City.

Contractor's other projects include the domestic terminal at Mumbai's Chhatrapati Shivaji Airport and the DY Patil Stadium, which serves as the home stadium for both the Mumbai Indians cricket team and Mumbai City FC football team. He also designed the Turbhe railway station in Navi Mumbai and in 2018 offered to design 19 railway stations across the country for free. He was the architect for Chief Minister of Telangana's official residence, Pragathi Bhavan completed in November 2016. He has been assigned to design the campus of Indian Institute of Petroleum & Energy, Visakhapatnam. An interview of his was published in the official Class 8 English book.

== Architectural style ==
Contractor has referred to the standardized ratings used in Western countries for certifying green buildings as a "joke". In his view, conditions in India require a rating system that takes into account the unique problems faced by that country, such as the loss of farmlands and green cover. He often highlights that Indian metropolises must increase FSI in certain zones, particularly in cities where land is scarce, in order to accommodate the rising population, and ensure that the housing costs are moderated.

In a New York Times profile he was described as Bollywood's "Starchitect". The article described Contractor's style as having a 'penchant for glitz,' also suggesting that his key developments like DLF Cyber City in Gurgaon and Hiranandani Gardens in Mumbai, "are more than just symbols of India's rise; they are a key part of it" He was quoted saying in an India Today article, "We believe that architecture should be based on current demand, should be honest, should respond to the spirit of the time, and should be for the people ... For us, the most important is design efficiency, and we have reinvented ourselves with time. We can challenge any plan and show a way to design the same more efficiently, without any compromise. We have improved already designed master plans with 30 per cent lesser infrastructure, bigger green areas and better plot sizes."

== List of works ==
Name	Year completed	Image	City	Notes	Ref
Apollo Hospital, Indraprastha					
Sarala Birla Academy					
ITC Grand Central	2004		Mumbai	Art deco styled hotel skyscraper	
ITC Royal Bengal	2019		Kolkata	Art deco styled hotel skyscraper	
DY Patil Stadium	2008		Navi Mumbai		
The Imperial	2010		Mumbai	Tallest building in India between 2010 and 2018	
23 Marina	2012		Dubai		
One Horizon Center	2014		Gurgaon		
Mantri Pinnacle	2016		Bangalore	Tallest building in Bangalore	
The 42	2019		Kolkata	Tallest building in India between 2018 and 2019	
Lokhandwala Minerva			Mumbai		
Turbhe railway station			Navi Mumbai		
CIDCO Spaghetti Housing	2005		Navi Mumbai		
DLF Camellias	2018		Gurgaon		
Birla Institute of Technology and Science, Pilani	2020		Pilani		
BITS Pilani K K Birla Goa Campus	2023		Goa		

== Gallery ==
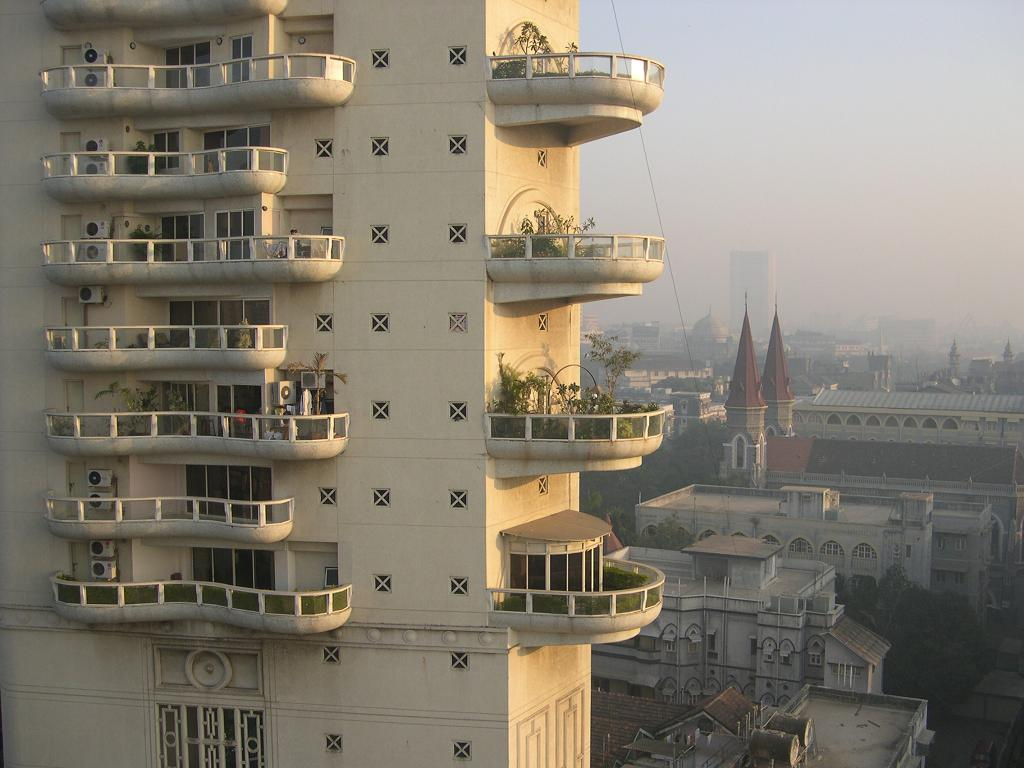
Buckley Court in Colaba, Mumbai

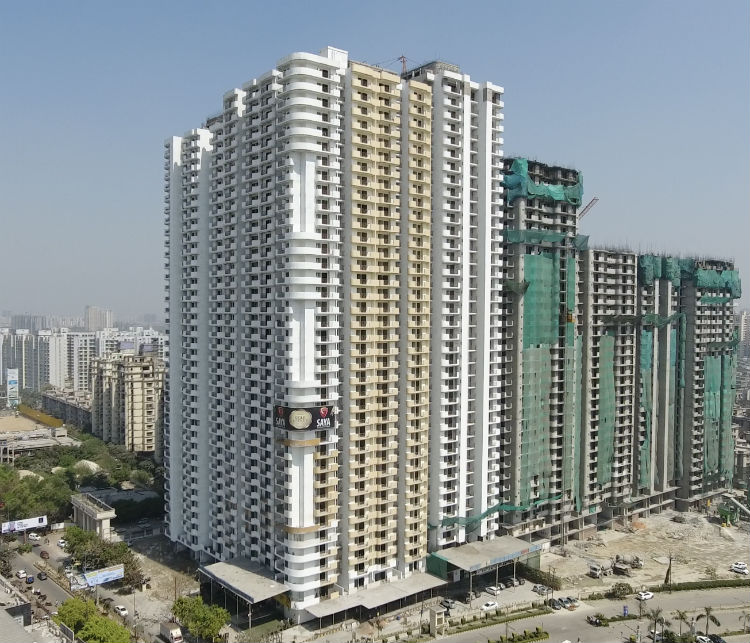
Saya Gold Avenue in Indirapuram, Ghaziabad

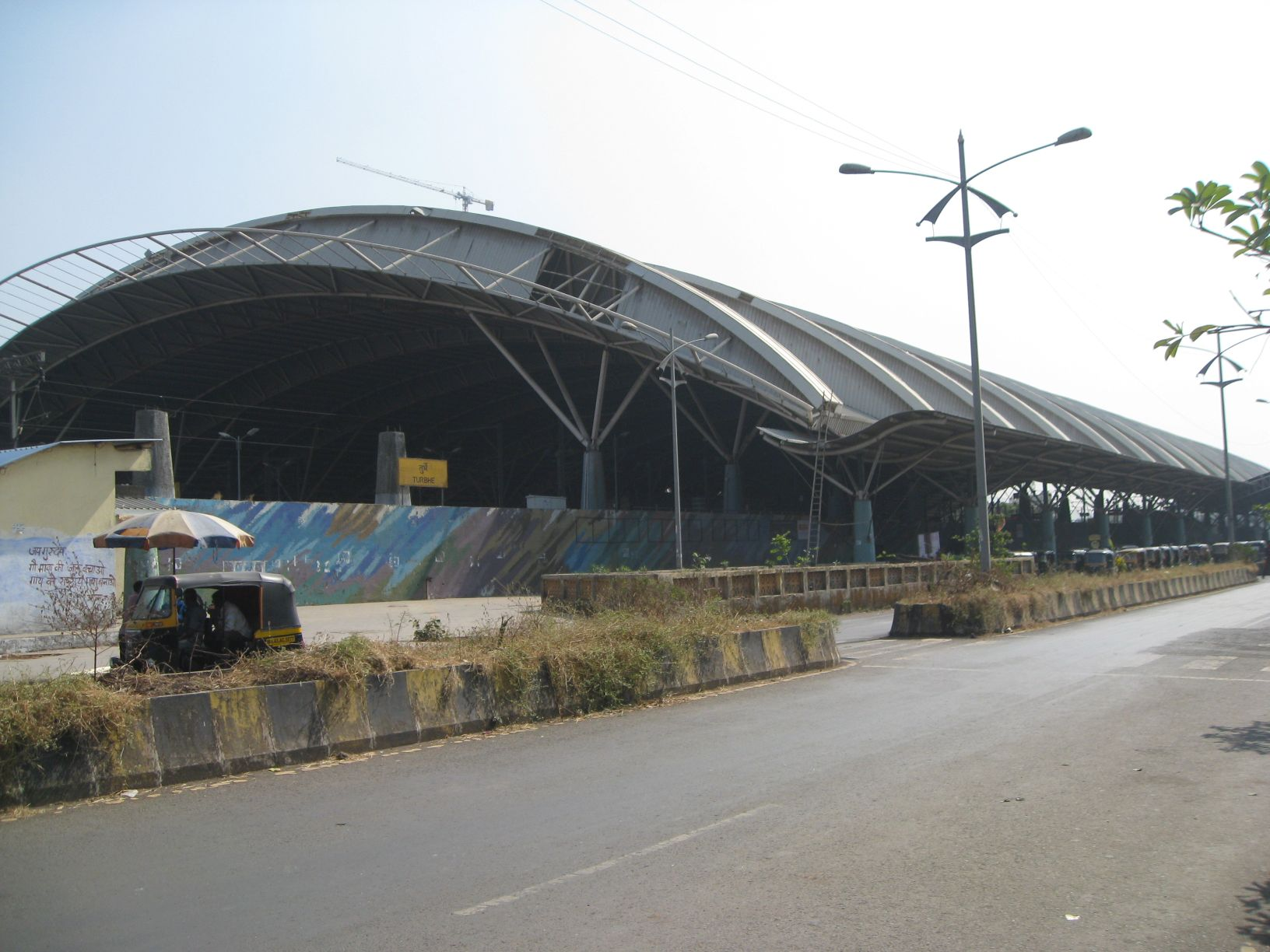
Turbhe railway station in Navi Mumbai

== Awards and recognition ==
- Hafeez was awarded India's third highest civilian award, the Padma Bhushan, in 2016.
