= Vistara =

Indian airline (2013–2024)

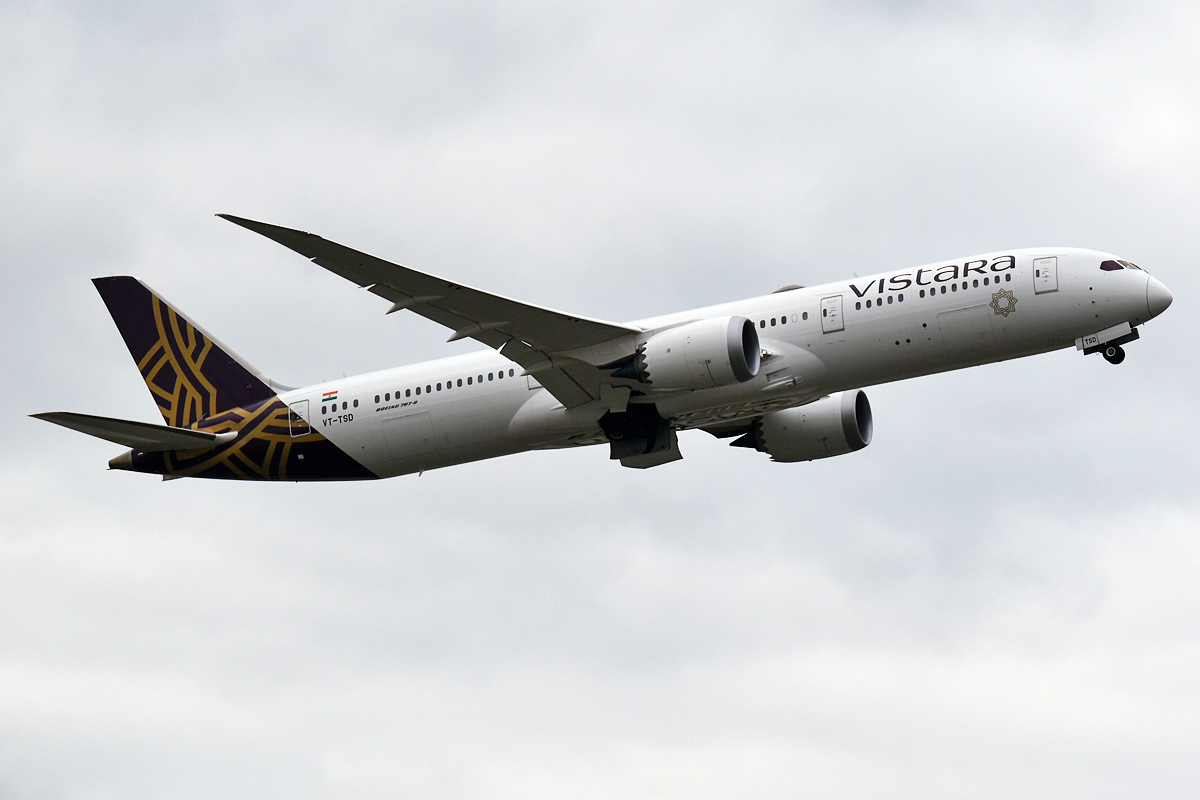
- Vistara Boeing 787-9
IATA	ICAO	Call sign
UK	VTI	VISTARA
- Founded: 2013; 13 years ago
- Commenced operations: 9 January 2015; 11 years ago
- Ceased operations: 12 November 2024; 22 months ago (merged with Air India)
- Hubs: Indira Gandhi International Airport
- Frequent-flyer program: Club Vistara
- Fleet size: 70
- Destinations: 50
- Parent company: Tata Sons (51%)
- Headquarters: Gurgaon, Haryana, India
- Key people: Bhaskar Bhat (Chairman); Vinod Kannan (CEO)
- Revenue: ▲₹15,191 crore (US$1.6 billion) (2024)
- Profit: ▼₹−581 crore (US$−60 million) (2024)
- Employees: ~5500 (Sept 2023)
- Website: www.airvistara.com

Tata SIA Airlines Limited, doing business as Vistara, was a full-service Indian airline based in Gurgaon, with its hub at Indira Gandhi International Airport. A joint venture between Tata Sons (51 percent) and Singapore Airlines (49 percent), the carrier began operations on 9 January 2015 with its inaugural flight between Delhi and Mumbai. As of September 2024, it held a 10 percent share of the domestic airline market, making it the third largest domestic carrier behind IndiGo and Air India. The airline served 50 destinations using a fleet that included the Airbus A320neo, Airbus A321neo and Boeing 787-9 aircraft. Vistara ceased operations on 12 November 2024 following its merger with the national flag carrier, Air India.

== History ==
=== Foundation and early years ===
The airline was founded in 2013 as a joint venture between India's conglomerate Tata Sons and Singapore's Singapore Airlines (SIA). The two organisations had made a bid in the mid-1990s to launch a full-service carrier in India that eventually prevailed as unsuccessful after being denied regulatory approval by the Indian government. In 2012, with India easing up foreign direct investment regulations for aviation—allowing up to 49% overseas ownership—Tata and SIA yet again embarked on floating a joint venture airline company in India. The joint venture, Tata SIA Airlines Limited (TSAL), was envisaged as a premium full-service carrier to cater to the demands of high-end business travellers in India's civil aviation market dominated by low-cost carriers. India's Foreign Investment Promotion Board approved this venture in October 2013, allowing SIA to take a 49% stake in the airline. The two parent companies initially pledged to invest a combined US$100 million as start-up capital, with Tata Sons owning 51% and Singapore Airlines owning the remaining 49%. This was part of Tata's second major foray into the aviation sector along with a minority stake in AirAsia India. The company's maiden aviation venture, Tata Airlines, was established in the 1930s and later became the flag carrier Air India after its nationalisation.

The company unveiled its brand identity Vistara on 11 August 2014. The name took inspiration from the Sanskrit word vistāra, meaning "limitless expanse". Vistara received its air operator's certificate from the Directorate General of Civil Aviation on 15 December 2014 and initiated operations on 9 January 2015. It became the first carrier to operate domestic services out of the new Terminal 2 at Mumbai's Chhatrapati Shivaji Maharaj International Airport. On 24 August 2015, Vistara inaugurated the Aviation Security Training Institute, an in-house institute for training its cockpit and cabin crew, security staff and personnel related to the aviation domain. The institute secured the necessary approvals from the nodal body Bureau of Civil Aviation Security. From the first month of operation, Vistara consistently achieved very high on-time performance records of over 90%, the highest among India's domestic carriers. On 20 August 2015, Vistara declared it had carried half a million passengers in just over seven months of operations. As of February 2016, Vistara has a share of 2% in the domestic carrier market, and had ferried over two million passengers by June 2016. Vistara received the membership of the International Air Transport Association in 2018.

Vistara announced on 11 July 2019 that their maiden international destination would be Singapore. The airline began its first international service from Delhi to Singapore on 6 August and from Mumbai to Singapore on 7 August, respectively, using the same Boeing 737-800 NG which had previously been operated by Jet Airways.

=== Development since 2020 ===
On 29 February 2020, the airline took the delivery of its first wide-body Boeing 787-9, becoming the first Indian airline to operate this aircraft. It awaited the delivery of five more such aircraft. On 28 May 2020, the airline operated its first commercial flight on the Boeing 787-9 on the Delhi-Kolkata route. On 28 August 2020, it started its first intercontinental flight between Delhi and London Heathrow.

After the acquisition of Air India by the Tata Group in January 2022, rumours of a merger between Vistara and Air India surfaced. On 2 September 2023, the Competition Commission of India approved the merger of Vistara with Air India. In November 2022, Tata Group and Singapore Airlines confirmed the merger of the two airlines. According to the plan, Singapore Airlines will take up a 25.1% stake in the combined entity.

On 4 May 2023, Vistara operated a Boeing 787-9 aircraft between Delhi and Mumbai with a mixture of 17% sustainable aviation fuel and 83% jet fuel, which cut down CO_{2} emissions by 4500 kg. This was India's first commercial flight with sustainable aviation fuel.

On 8 January 2024, the Vistara CEO announced that he expected that all regulatory clearance for the merger into Air India shall be completed by mid-2024 and the merging of operations would complete by mid-2025. The National Company Law Tribunal approved the merger on 6 June. On 30 August 2024, Vistara announced that it would stop accepting new bookings from 3 September 2024 and merge with Air India on 12 November 2024. The merger was completed on 12 November 2024.

== Corporate affairs ==
=== Overview ===
On 15 April 2014, Vistara chose Phee Teik Yeoh as the chief executive officer (CEO) and Giam Ming Toh as the chief commercial officer (CCO), both from Singapore Airlines.

In March 2015, Vistara relocated to its new office at the One Horizon Center tower in Sector 43, Gurgaon, a satellite city of Delhi. It initially started out with a three-member board comprising Swee Wah Mak (SIA group), Mukund Rajan, and Prasad Menon (Tata group), with the latter as chairman. In August 2015, the airline expanded the board by introducing two new members—Som Mittal and Sangeeta Pendurkar—along with an equity infusion of ₹2 billion (US$21 million), part of a ₹5 billion (US$52 million) tranche initially planned by both Tata and SIA. In January 2016, Bhaskar Bhat, present managing director of Titan, joined as the new chairman following Prasad Menon's retirement. In March 2016, Vistara appointed Sanjiv Kapoor as its chief strategy and commercial officer as the successor to Giam Ming Toh who was scheduled to leave in mid-April 2016 following completion of his deputation at Vistara.

On 16 October 2017, it was announced that Leslie Thng would succeed Yeoh Phee Teik as CEO of Vistara. Yeoh returned to Singapore Airlines to take up a senior management role as Acting Senior Vice President of Customer Experience. Thng was serving as Chief Commercial Officer of Budget Aviation Holdings, a Singapore Airlines subsidiary, prior to his appointment in Vistara. Before that, Thng was the chief executive officer of SilkAir, a full-service regional airline under Singapore Airlines. Sanjiv Kapoor resigned from his position as the Chief Commercial Officer of Vistara, on 31 December 2019, with Vinod Kannan, the Chief Strategy Officer, taking up Kapoor's responsibilities.

At the time of its merger with Air India, Vistara's head office was located at Tower A of Intellion Edge in Gurgaon.

=== Business figures ===
Financial highlights
Financial year (FY)	FY16	FY20
Total non-current liabilities	₹173.4 crore INR	₹6809.02 crore INR
Total current liabilities	₹206.99 crore INR	₹2261.59 crore INR
Total liabilities	₹380.4 crore INR	₹9070.62 crore INR
Revenue from operations	₹691.37 crore INR	₹4738.45 crore INR
Total expenses	₹1115.46 crore INR	₹6664.45 crore INR
Total profit	−₹400.9 crore INR	−₹1813.38 crore INR

== Destinations ==
Prior to merger, in November 2024, Vistara served 50 destinations across 12 countries. Its main hub was at the Indira Gandhi International Airport. Vistara's first flight was on 9 January 2015, from Delhi to Mumbai. On 6 August 2019, the airline launched its first international flight from Delhi to Singapore using a Boeing 737-800NG aircraft which was earlier used by Jet Airways.

=== Codeshare agreements ===
Before ceasing operations, the airline maintained codeshare agreements with the following airlines:

- Air Canada
- Air India
- British Airways
- Japan Airlines
- Lufthansa
- Singapore Airlines
- Swiss International Air Lines
- United Airlines

=== Interline agreements ===
The airline had interline agreements with the following airlines:

- Aeroflot
- Air France
- Air India
- Air Mauritius
- All Nippon Airways
- American Airlines
- Asiana Airlines
- British Airways
- Emirates
- Ethiopian Airlines
- Finnair
- Flydubai
- Gulf Air
- ITA Airways
- Japan Airlines
- Kam Air
- Kenya Airways
- KLM
- Kuwait Airways
- Qatar Airways
- Singapore Airlines
- SriLankan Airlines
- Turkish Airlines
- United Airlines

== Fleet ==
At the time of the merger with Air India, Vistara operated the following aircraft:

Vistara fleet
Aircraft	Number	Passengers				Refs	Notes
Aircraft	Number	J	S	Y	Total	Refs	Notes
Airbus A320neo	43	8	24	132	164		All transferred to Air India
Airbus A320neo	10	—	—	180	180		All transferred to Air India
Airbus A321LR	4	12	24	152	188		All transferred to Air India
Airbus A321neo	6	12	24	152	188		All transferred to Air India
Boeing 787-9	6	30	21	248	299		All transferred to Air India
Boeing 787-9	1	30	36	226	292		All transferred to Air India
Total	70						

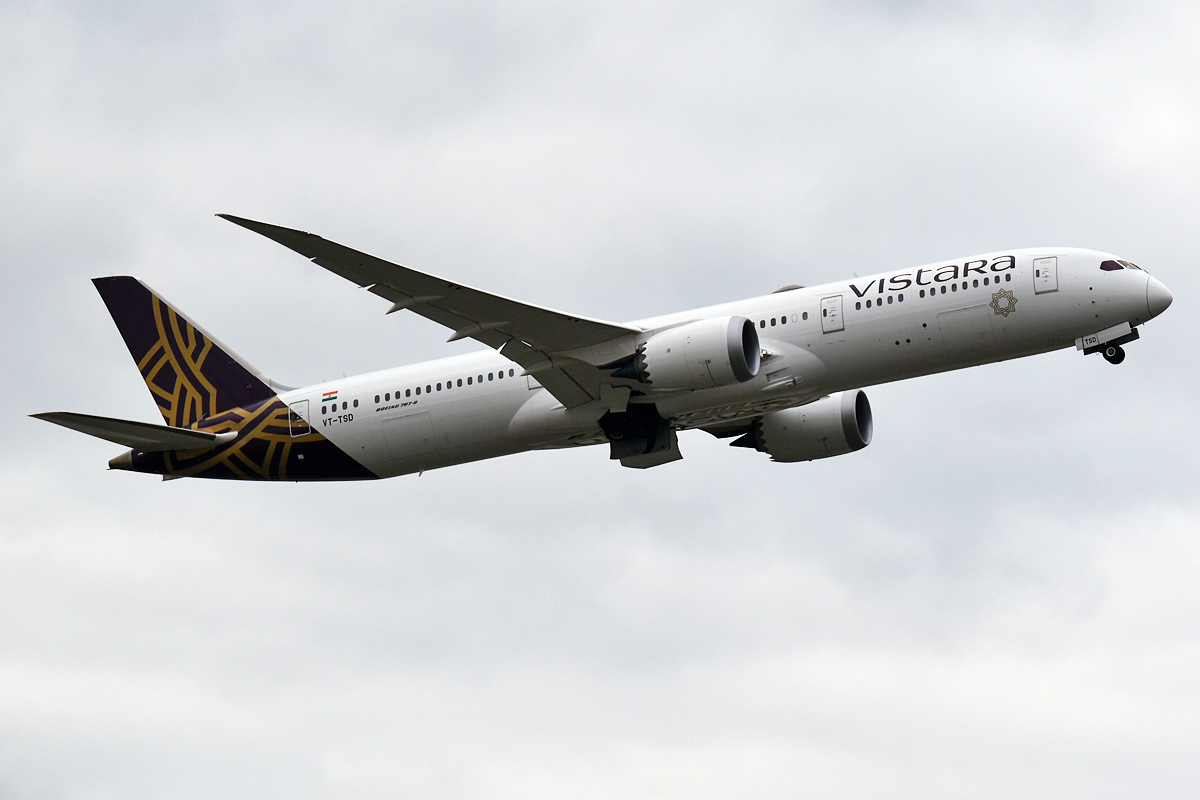
Vistara Boeing 787-9

=== Fleet development ===
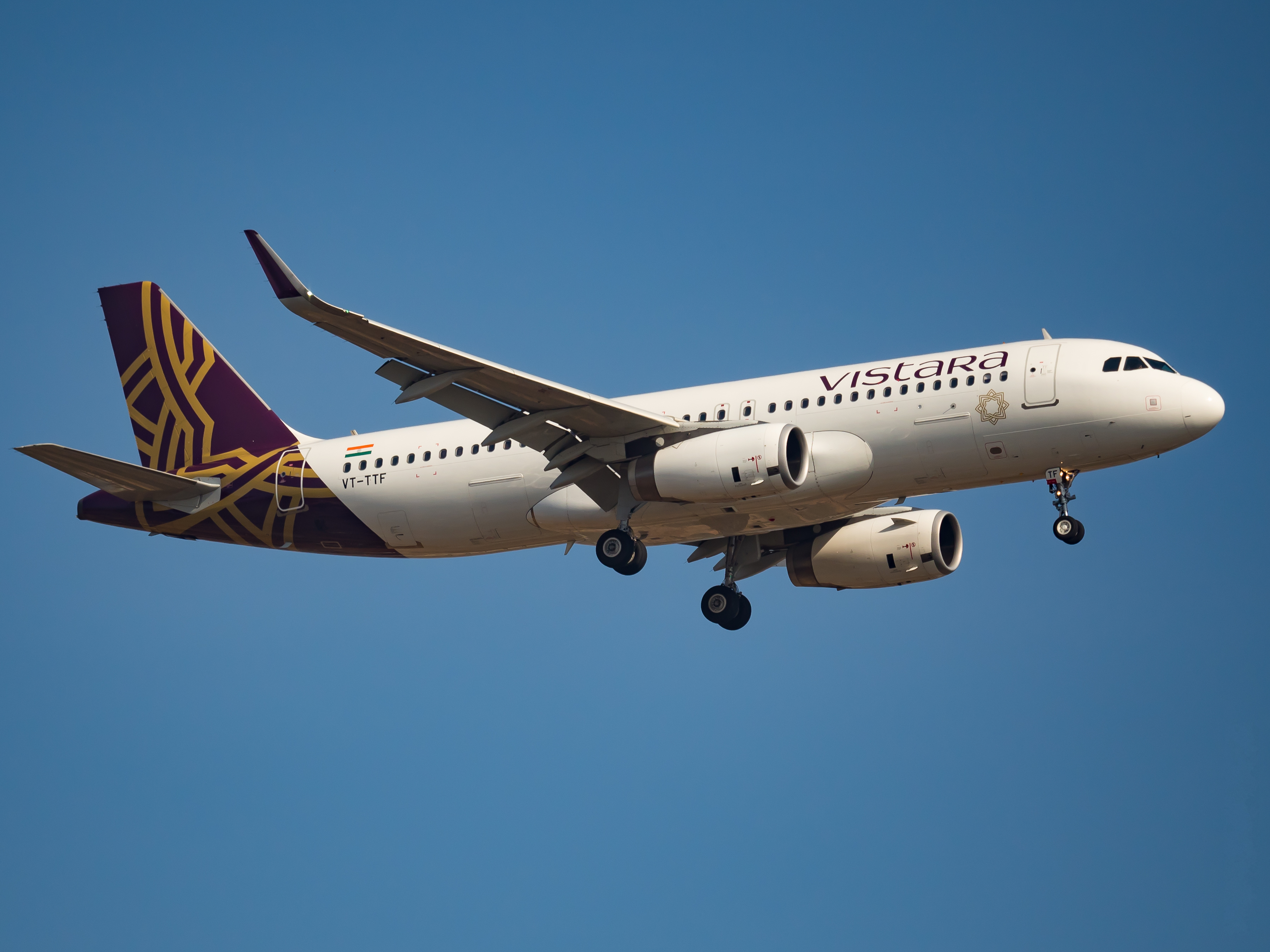
Vistara Airbus A320-200

Vistara took delivery of its first aircraft at New Delhi on 25 September 2014. The airline took delivery of the last of its thirteen original Airbus A320 aircraft in October 2016. In March 2015, Phee Teik Yeoh announced that the airline was planning to procure an unspecified number of both narrow-body and wide-body aircraft to enhance the domestic network and launch international flights within two years. Vistara inducted nine former Jet Airways Boeing 737-800 to its fleet following its grounding.

Vistara returned two of these planes in January 2020 and the remaining 737-800NG were retired by July 2023. It ordered six 787-9 aircraft from Boeing. The first of these Dreamliners were delivered in February 2020 and the second one in August 2020. The airline received its 50th Airbus A320neo aircraft in December 2023. Lastly, it received its seventh and final 787-9 in March 2024, bringing its total fleet count to 70.

== Services ==
=== Cabin ===
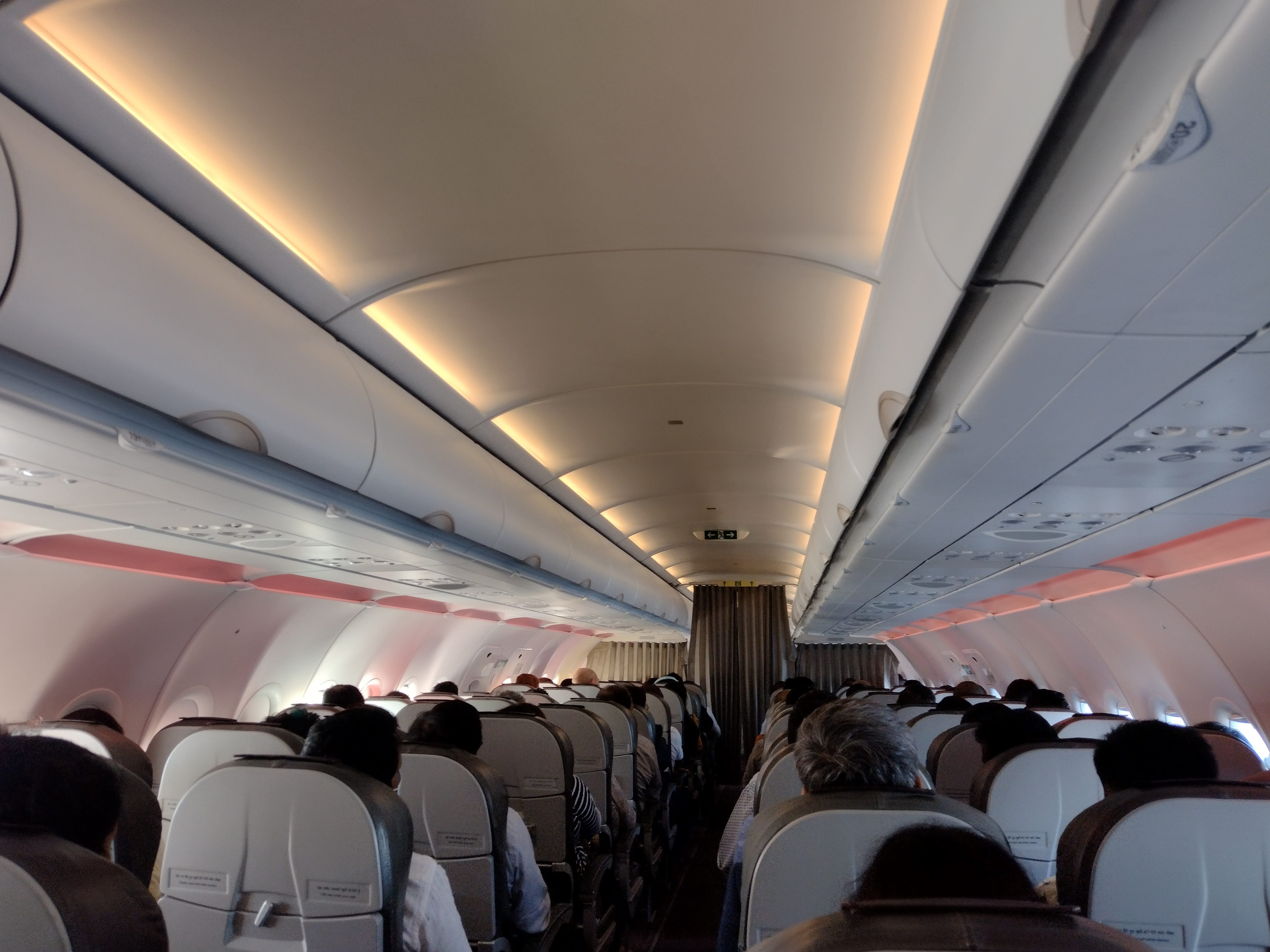
Cabin of Vistara Airbus A320neo

==== Business Class ====
On the Boeing 787-9 Dreamliner, Vistara offered 30 Stelia seats in a 1-2-1 configuration. Vistara had 8 business class seats, two rows in 2-2 configuration, in its 158-seater Airbus A320-200 fleet. These seats are still in use with Air India.

==== Premium Economy ====
Vistara was the first airline in India to introduce Premium Economy class in the domestic market. It offered 24 premium economy seats, four rows in 3-3 configuration, out of a total of 158 seats in the single aisle Airbus A320-200 aircraft in its fleet. On the Boeing 787-9 Dreamliner, it had on most flights 21 RECARO seats in a 2-3-2 configuration. On one aircraft the premium economy cabin had a 3-3-3 configuration and seats similar to the economy class. These seats are still in use with Air India.

==== Economy ====
On the Boeing 787-9 Dreamliner, Vistara had 248 seats, manufactured by Recaro. They are in a 3-3-3 configuration. These seats are still in use with Air India.

=== In-flight entertainment ===
Vistara World is the airline's wireless Wi-Fi inflight entertainment system that travellers can access on their personal handheld devices. Vistara selected a wireless IFE solution from Bluebox Aviation Systems to enable this service.

=== Catering ===
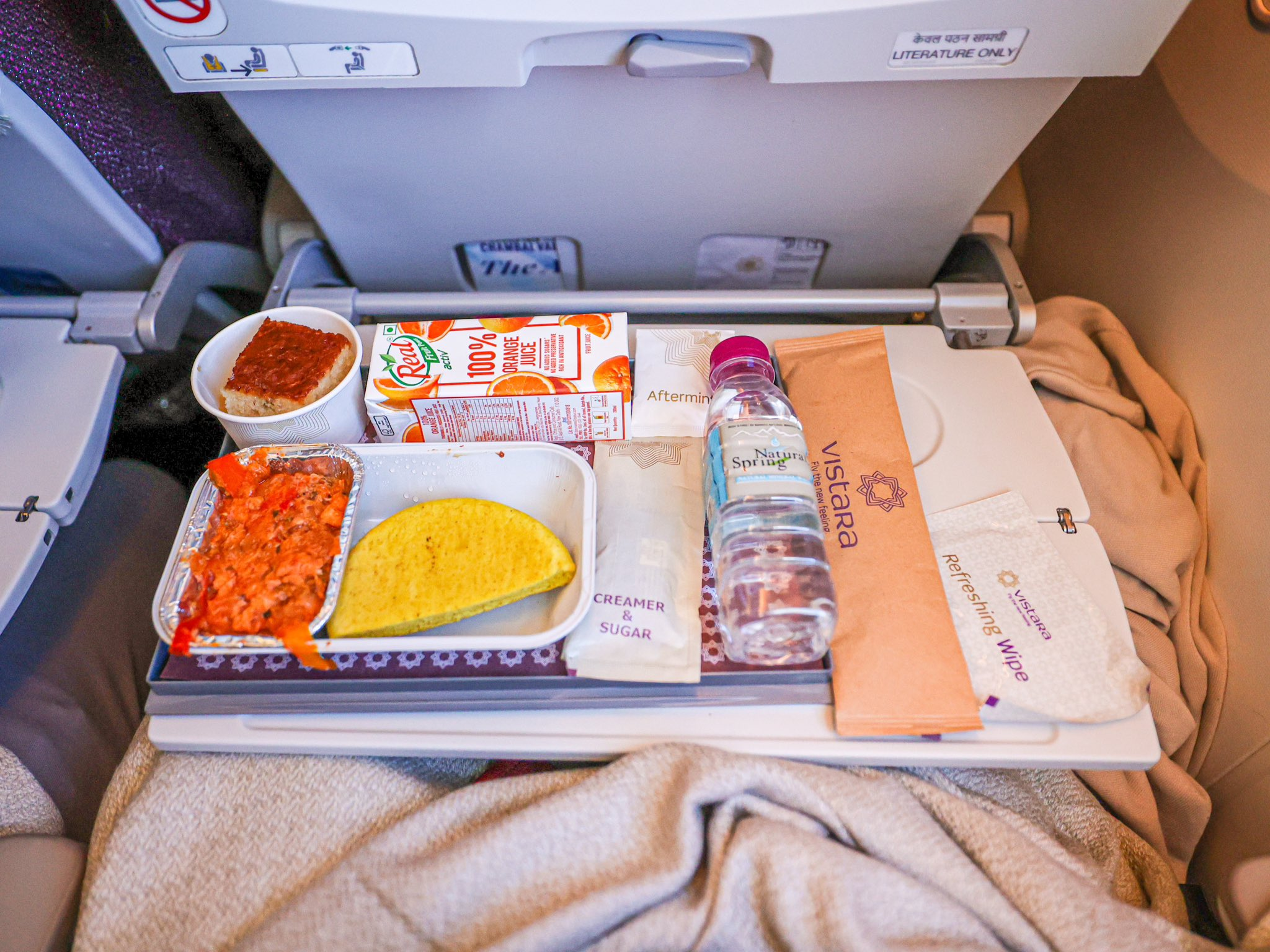
Vistara economy class in-flight meal

The in-flight food was catered by TajSATS Air Catering, another joint venture between Tata and a Singaporean company, headed by Chef Arun Batra, formerly the executive chef of the Taj Hotels group.

=== Lounge ===
On 29 March 2016, Vistara inaugurated premium lounge service for its Business-class passengers and Club Vistara Platinum & Gold members at the departure level of Terminal 3 of Indira Gandhi International Airport at Delhi. The lounge is spread across 250 square meters on the air-side and can seat 75 people at a time.

With effect from 1 April 2020, Vistara discontinued its Flagship Lounge at Terminal 3 of Indira Gandhi International Airport in Delhi. Vistara then provided lounge access to their eligible guests at the Plaza Premium Lounge at the Mezzanine Floor of Delhi Airport Terminal 3.

=== Frequent-flyer program ===
Vistara used Club Vistara as its frequent-flyer program; it operated as a value-based program and awarded points on the basis of money spent on tickets rather than miles travelled by passengers. On 29 January 2015, Vistara announced a partnership agreement with Singapore Airlines which would allow Club Vistara members to earn and redeem miles on Singapore Airlines flights.

== See also ==
- List of defunct airlines of India
- List of airports in India
- Aviation in India
