= Alok Sharma (neuroscientist) =

Indian neuroscientist

- Born: 27 June 1961 (age 65)
- Education: MBBS, M.S.(general Surgery), M.Ch.(Neurosurgery), Seth G.S. medical College, KEM Hospital of Mumbai University
- Medical career
- Profession: Neurosurgeon & Neuroscientist
- Institutions: Neurosurgeon Brain and Spine institute, Lokmanya Tilak Municipal General Hospital & College, Mumbai, India.
- Awards: Bharat Gaurav Award, Sushrut Award

Alok Sharma (born 27 June 1961) is an Indian neuroscientist and neurosurgeon. He is the President of the Indian Society of Regenerative Science and director of Neurogen Brain and Spine Institute, Mumbai.

== Early life and education ==
Sharma earned his MB BS, MS (general surgery) and MCh (neurosurgery) from King Edward Memorial Hospital and Seth Gordhandas Sunderdas Medical College of Mumbai University.

== Professional experience ==
Sharma is currently the President of the Indian Society of Regenerative Science (formerly known as the Stem Cell Society of India) and Vice President, International Association of Neurorestoratology (IANR). He is also the Director of NeuroGen Brain & Spine Institute & Professor & Head of Department - Neurosurgery, at Lokmanya Tilak Municipal General Hospital and Lokmanya Tilak Municipal Medical College, Mumbai, India.

He is an internationally recognised Indian neurosurgeon, who has 144 scientific publications to his name in the field of stem cell therapy and 54 publications on other neurology related topics.

== Awards and recognition ==
"Bharat Gaurav" award for Distinguished Services to the Nation & Outstanding Individual Achievements at the House of Commons of the British Parliament in London, UK.

Coveted Sushrut Award in 2010, at Mumbai by the Red Swastik Society, for commendable or exemplary work in the field of Surgery-cum-Community Service.

"Excellence in services in stem cell therapy" by ‘Times health excellence award’ at the hands notable Indian oncologist.Suresh H. Advani.
