= Sharad Vaidya =

Indian surgeon (1936–2000)

- Born: 7 March 1936
- Died: 19 October 2000 (aged 64); Bombay, India
- Occupations: Surgeon, anti-tobacco activist
- Spouse: Nirmala Vaidya
- Children: Jayant, Shekhar

Sharad Vaidya (7 March 1936 – 19 October 2000) was an Indian surgeon who specialized in cancer surgery. He established the Goa Cancer Society and founded the Gosalia Memorial Cancer Hospital and the National Organisation for Tobacco Eradication.

== Early life ==
He came from the Vaidya family practicing medicine for over 350 years. He qualified as a doctor and then as a surgeon from University of Bombay and King Edward Memorial Hospital, Bombay.

== Career ==
Vaidya was a well known general surgeon practising in Goa. He initially worked in the Goa Medical College as Asst professor of Surgery for 5 years. and later established the Vaidya Hospital in Panaji, Goa, along with his wife, Dr Nirmala S Vaidya. As a general surgeon he was famous for his clinical and operative skills in general surgery, orthopaedic surgery and cancer surgery. He was the first surgeon to practice neurosurgery in Goa. When there were inadequate resources he would develop and make new tools - one example is a rapid film changer for cerebral angiograms.

The lack of facilities for treating cancer in Goa, led him to found and lead the Goa Cancer Society in 1968. Despite his busy clinical practice he devoted time to raise funds and collected skilled people to build the Gosalia Memorial Cancer Hospital, Dona Paula, Goa - the first full-fledged cancer hospital in the region. He was the Director and Chief surgeon there, serving without a salary, until 1993.

== Anti-tobacco stance ==
From early in his career, Vaidya recognised that a third of cancers he was treating could be prevented. He convinced the Goa Legislative Assembly to pass the Goa Prohibition of Tobacco Act 1997. This act was the culmination of 30 years of efforts to educate the people and children of Goa about the harmful effects of tobacco on health, economy and ecology, and effectively reducing the rates of tobacco-related diseases such as heart disease and cancer in the last decade of the 20th century. The law has been the harbinger of similar laws in the rest of India and was far ahead of similar laws in Europe.

Vaidya claimed "Tobacco entered India through Goa and it will leave via Goa".

=== Educating the Children ===
The educational material Vaidya produced is now included in the regular curriculum of schools since 1994. He implemented his idea of teaching a child - the first to be educated in the family - about the harmful effects of tobacco reduced the incidence of tobacco use in the whole household. Along with his wife Nirmala, he produced educational material for use at several age groups.

== Awards ==
Of the many awards Vaidya received, the ones he valued most were: 1) On 19 December 1986, he was awarded an Ornamental Silver Lamp and Certificate of Appreciation at the 25th Silver Jubilee celebrations at the hands of the president of India, for "his outstanding contribution to Goa's progress". 2) In 1989, Vaidya was awarded a gold medal and Commemorative Certificate on the 2nd World No Tobacco Day for "his continuing commitment in the field of health to the cause of Tobacco Free Societies".
