= One Horizon Center =

DLF Horizon Center

General information
- Status: Completed
- Type: Commercial
- Location: Golf Course Road, Sector-43, Gurgaon, NCR, India
- Owner: DLF

Technical details
- Floor count: 25
- Floor area: 34,000 sf
- Lifts/elevators: 19

Design and construction
- Architect: Robert A.M. Stern Architects
- Developer: DLF and Hines

Website
- dlfhorizoncenter.com

DLF Horizon Center at Golf Course Road, Sector 43, Gurgaon, India, is a 25 storied high-rise commercial building. Designed by architect Robert A.M. Stern Architects, the project is developed by Indian real estate giant DLF and Global real estate developer Hines. The building is LEED Platinum rated for its eco-friendly design.

== Offices ==
It used to house the head office of Vistara, the Tata-Singapore Airlines joint venture airline company. Apart from Vistara, the list of tenants at One Horizon Center include Oracle, Hyatt Hotels, GlaxoSmithKline, Apple Inc., American Express, Coca-Cola, British Council, DP World, Samsung, CorporatEdge among others.

== Towers ==
=== One Horizon Center ===
One Horizon Center is a building in the center of Gurugram. The building has 25 stories and 0.9 Mn Sq Ft space. This center provides commercial space for multinational companies and modern businesses. It is across the Arnold Palmer-designed DLF Golf & Country Club, one of the last remaining commercial tracts on Golf-Course Road. One Horizon Center is surrounded by shopping malls, restaurants, and hotels.

=== Two Horizon Center ===
Two Horizon Center is a crescent-shaped tower with a curved glass facade. It spreads over 1.17 Mn Sq Ft and is a LEED certified commercial building on the main Golf Course Road, Gurgaon. The top of the building consists of a helipad. This tower incorporates 5-star hotels and offices of Fortune 500 companies.

=== Horizon Plaza ===
Horizon Plaza has various culinary and leisure spaces. It is surrounded by trees, garden cafes, sit-out areas, and seating arrangements. There are terrace gardens that link the buildings with the green hub at its center.

== How to reach ==
DLF Horizon Center is located at a 35-minute drive from Indira Gandhi International Airport, Delhi. It takes an 8-minute drive from Sikanderpur rapid metro station and a 10-minute drive from Huda city center metro station. The nearest bus stop is the Genpact bus stop, from where it's just a 5 minutes walk.

== Specifications ==
- DLF's private fire station within DLF 5
- Designed to conform to seismic zone V
- Incorporates a Rooftop helipad
- Floorplates designed to maximize daylight penetration

== Awards and recognitions ==
- Awarded 'The commercial building project of the year' in 2018
- Awarded 'Best Commercial High-rise in India' at the 'Asia Pacific International Property Awards' 2013-14
- Certified with LEED Platinum standards for very high environment friendly aspect in its design
