= Uttam Kumar (artist) =

Indian artist (born 1979)

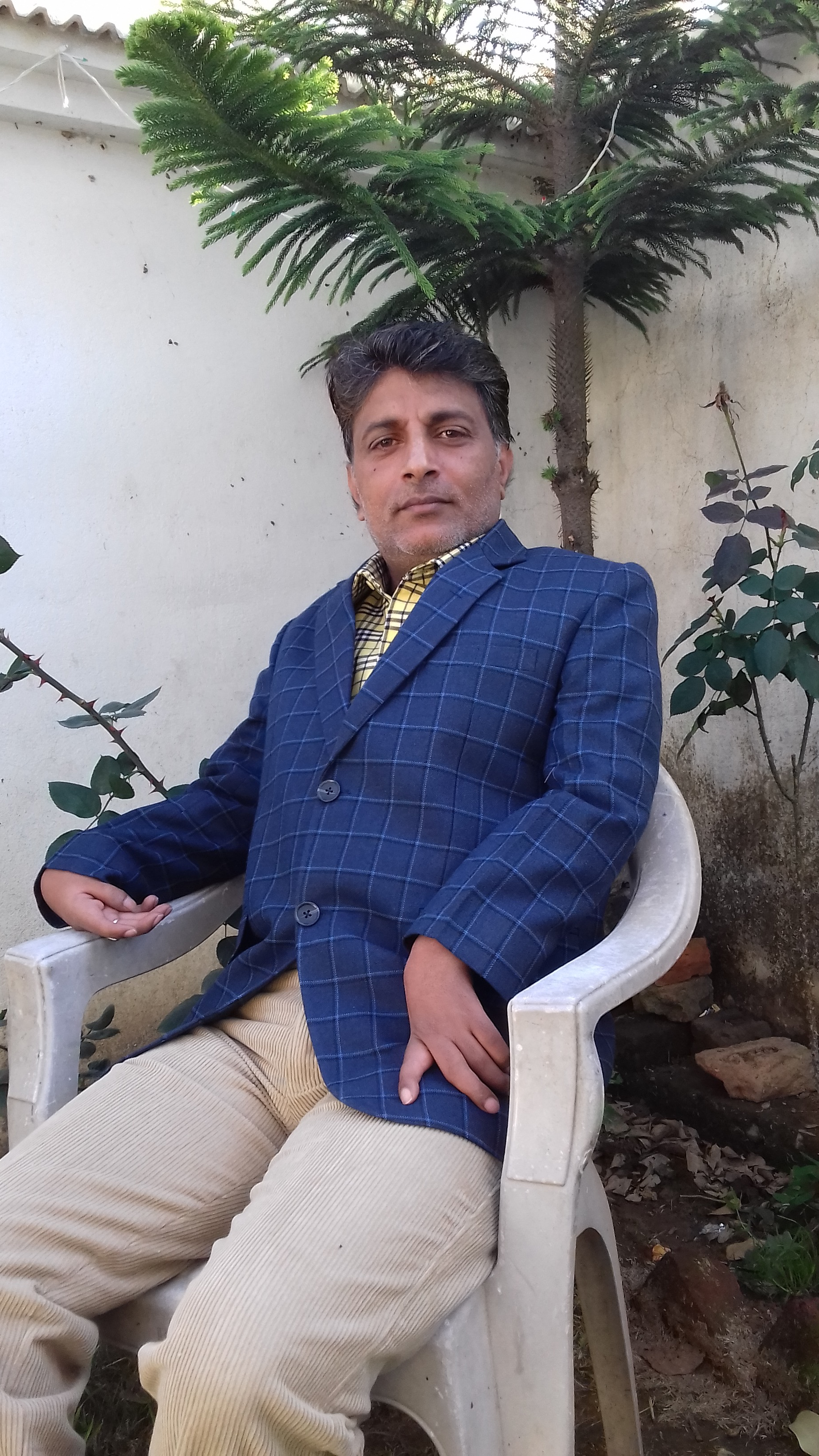
- Born: 22 December 1979 (age 46); Udhampur, Jammu and Kashmir
- Known for: Foot painting
- Website: jdfmart.org

Uttam Kumar (born 1979) is an Indian artist. A birth condition rendered Kumar unable to use his arms, and so the artist paints using his feet.

== Early life and career ==
Kumar was born in Jammu, India. Since birth, Kumar has been unable to use either of his arms or his right leg. As such, Kumar produces digital art and canvas painting using his feet. He was invited to speak at the recently held TEDx TughlaqRd event at the India Islamic Center. While working in the India, he was inspired by an artwork of Sobha Singh (painter) and claims to follow Sobha's style of creative painting.

Kumar is the chairman of JD FOOT AND MOUTH ARTS(STEPS TO LIFE). This is foundation of 143 disabled children. The vision of these is to help an disable child into an abled man in his or her life. The bunch line of this foundation is " ENTER IN THE WORLD OF ART".Kumar became the first feet artist as a part of the Host panel in International Day of Persons with Disabilities (3 December) by HEART BEAT Foundation national exhibition event 2016.

In 2018, The Union Capital of New Delhi hosted a painting exhibition by Udhampur-based “Feet Artist”, Uttam Kumar who, being a “Divyang” and unable to use his hands and fingers for painting, mastered the art of painting incredible pieces of art with the use of his feet and toes. This was disclosed by Union Minister Dr Jitendra Singh who had invited Uttam Kumar to Delhi after learning about him and discovering him through the social media.

=== Scope of work ===
His art spans multiple media, including virtual realistic nature. He has also worked with l ive performance in national events. Most of his creations exist outside of the mainstream art world.

Stylistically, Kumar's art has connections to nature, abstract painting, and experimental canvas. Some pieces feature realistic components, others are organic in nature.
