= National Organisation for Tobacco Eradication (India) =

Indian federation of non-governmental organisations

The National Organisation for Tobacco Eradication (NOTE) is an Indian federation of 20 non-governmental organisations that was founded during a meeting in Goa in 1992. The first national chairman was Sharad Vaidya, who retained this position until his death in 2000. Currently, the federation is chaired by Shekhar Salkar.

NOTE has chapters in 7 states (Karnataka, Andhra Pradesh, Orissa, Bihar, Madhya Pradesh, Uttar Pradesh, and Goa) and has its headquarters in Goa. There are collaborating institutions and individuals in all Indian states.

== Aims and objectives ==
1. Networking and co-ordinating campaigns of various institutions and NGOs
2. Exerting pressure on the government for policy changes
3. Exposing and attacking the tobacco companies
4. Research into various aspects of campaigns and policies at the national level
5. Interaction with international bodies like WHO, UICC, World Bank, American Cancer Society etc. for mobilising international opinion towards a tobacco-free world

== Activities ==
NOTE's campaign is built on solid information about tobacco and its effects on health. NOTE analyses and assesses public policy, publications, journals, official reports, medical research, and the media. It makes this information available to members and collaborators.

Several papers and letters have been published under the auspices of NOTE (e.g., in BMJ, The Lancet, The New England Journal of Medicine, and The Journal of Indian Medical Association). In August 2000, Dr Sharad Vaidya made a representation to the WHO Framework Convention on Tobacco Control. NOTE continues to campaign against depiction of tobacco in the media.

NOTE produces a range of campaigning materials including video cassettes, audio cassettes, flip charts, booklets, posters, and stickers. Through its activities, NOTE was able to bring about a change in the perception about tobacco in the general population and in 1997 the first anti-tobacco law was passed in Goa (The Goa Prohibition of Smoking and Spitting Act, 1997; Goa Act 5 of 1999). In the 10 years following the passing of this law, the morbidity and mortality from tobacco related diseases were reduced significantly.
