= Topiwala National Medical College and BYL Nair Charitable Hospital =

Medical college in Maharashtra, India

Coordinates: 18.9727°N 72.8212°E

Topiwala National Medical College and Bai Yamunabai Laxman Nair Charitable Hospital
- Type: Medical college and hospital
- Established: 4 September 1921; 104 years ago
- Dean: Dr. Shailesh Mohite
- Address: Mumbai, Maharashtra, India
- Affiliations: Maharashtra University of Health Sciences
- Website: tnmcnair.edu.in

Topiwala National Medical College and BYL Nair Charitable Hospital is a government medical college in Mumbai, Maharashtra. The college imparts the degree Bachelor of Medicine, Bachelor of Surgery (MBBS). It is recognised by the National Medical Commission. It is one of the oldest medical colleges in Mumbai. The selection to the college is done on the basis of merit through the National Eligibility and Entrance Test. The yearly undergraduate student intake is 150.

== History ==
Through donations from the Tilak Swaraj Funds, on the 4th of September 1921, the National Medical College was established. This college started functioning at the Victoria Cross Lane, Byculla. As, in those days, all the universities were controlled by the British Indian government, the founders affiliated the institution to the College of Physicians and Surgeons of Bombay and the first batch of students was admitted for its Licentiate Medical Practitioner (LMP) course.

The People's Free Hospital was set up close to the present campus and near where the YMCA stands today. Dr. A. L. Nair who was the proprietor of the Powell and Co. dealing in medical supplies and equipments donated two acres of his land for the hospital campus. In 1925, Dr. Nair also helped set up a well-equipped hospital which he named after his mother Bai Yamunabai Laxman Nair. He also donated funds to run the hospital. Much later, Mr. MN Desai, popularly known as Topiwala Desai, made a generous contribution of Rs.5 lacs to the college – which was then named after him as the Topiwala National Medical College.

In 1946, the municipal corporation of the city of Bombay passed a resolution taking over the college and the hospital. Acknowledging the strong support from the Municipal Corporation, the Bombay University also affiliated the twin institutions.

The campus has expanded from the two acres donated by Mr. Nair in 1946 to twenty acres in 2006 and the number of buildings in the campus has increased manifold. It provides training courses in more than 25 different medical and allied branches, including 9 superspeciality courses.

During the COVID-19 pandemic in 2020, Nair hospital served for 4 months as a dedicated hospital for the treatment of patients with COVID-19. It successfully treated 6000 patients and delivered 500 COVID-19 positive mothers' babies, before returning to serve as a tertiary care hospital after the number of COVID-19 cases in the city came under control.

== Courses ==
Topiwala National Medical College undertakes education and training of students in MBBS & post graduate medical speciality courses. This college also has permission to grant post graduate degrees in other clinical & non-clinical disciplines.
