= Seth G.S. Medical College and King Edward Memorial Hospital =

Seth Gordhandas Sunderdas Medical College and King Edward Memorial Hospital
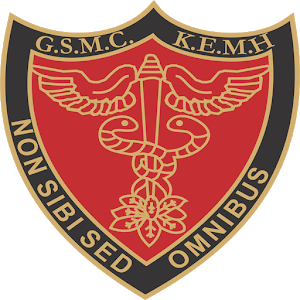
- Official crest
- Motto: Non Sibi Sed Omnibus
- Type: Education and research institution
- Established: 1926; 100 years ago
- Affiliations: Maharashtra University of Health Sciences, NMC
- Endowment: Public
- Dean: Dr. Harish M. Pathak
- Location: Parel, Mumbai, Maharashtra, India; 19.0017°N 72.8418°E

Services
- Beds: 2,250

Links
- Website: www.kem.edu

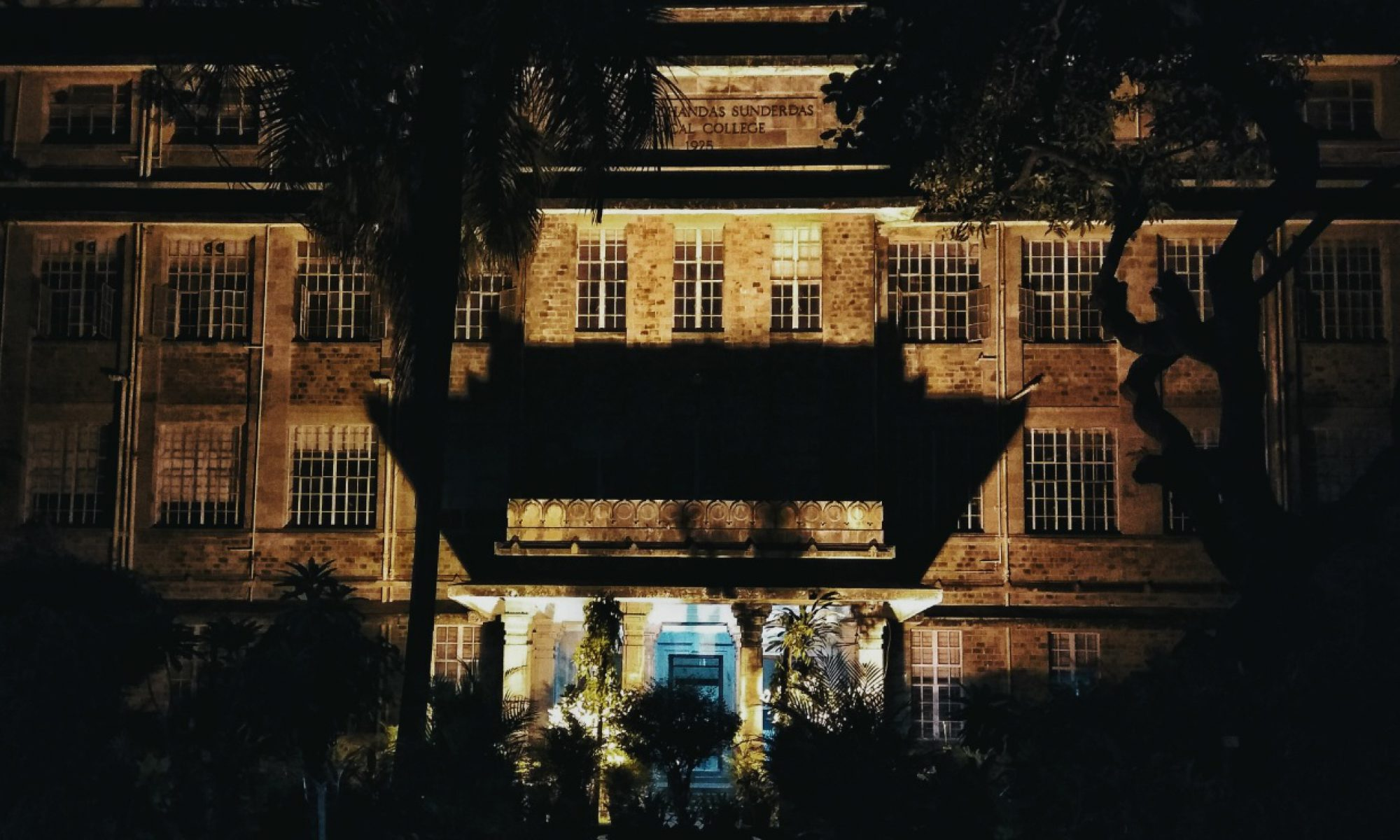
The college building

Seth GS Medical College and King Edward Memorial Hospital is a public medical college and hospital, located in Mumbai, Maharashtra, India. It was founded in 1926. The medical college is affiliated with Maharashtra University of Health Sciences (MUHS).

== Courses ==
The medical college (school) provides training to about 2,000 students at the undergraduate, postgraduate, and super-specialty medical courses-level; in undergraduate and postgraduate physical and occupational therapy courses; Masters and Ph.D. courses in various allied specialties. A nursing school is also maintained by this institution.

== Hospital ==
With about 390 staff physicians and 550 resident doctors, the 2,250 bedded hospital treats about 1.8 million out-patients and 85,000 in-patients annually. It provides both basic care and advanced treatment facilities in all fields of medicine and surgery. Funded mainly by the Brihanmumbai Municipal Corporation, this institution renders virtually free of cost service to the underprivileged sections of the society.

During the COVID-19 pandemic, on 3 May 2020, Indian Air Force choppers showered flower petals on King Edward Memorial (KEM) Hospital, J. J. Hospital, and Kasturba Gandhi Hospital to pay tribute to healthcare workers fighting for the safety of the people of Mumbai.

== Rankings ==
University and college rankings

Medical – India
- India Today (2020): 12

The college was ranked 12th among medical colleges in India in 2020 by India Today.

== Notable alumni ==
- Dwarkanath Kotnis (1910–1942), Indian humanitarian physician, served in China during the Second Sino-Japanese War
- Keshavrao Krishnarao Datey (1912–1983), cardiologist, Padma Bhushan (1969), Fellow Royal College of Physicians
- Tehemton Erach Udwadia (1934–2023), gastroenterologist, Dr. B. C. Roy Award (2000), Padma Shri (2006), Order of the British Empire (2006)
- Sharad Panday (1934–2004), Indian cardiothoracic surgeon, part of the team that performed the first heart transplant in India
- Sharad Vaidya (1936–2000), cancer surgeon, established Goa Cancer Society, Gosalia Memorial Cancer Hospital, Goa, and NOTE National Organisation for Tobacco Eradication (India). He was instrumental in legislation to reduce tobacco use in India.
- Nilima Arun Kshirsagar (born 1949), clinical pharmacologist, former dean of KEM, Known for pharmacovigilance, drug development, tropical diseases, drug resistance, and medical education. Nathaniel T., Dr. B. C. Roy Award Kwit memorial Award
- Amol Kolhe (born 1980), Member of Parliament for Shirur
- Alok Sharma (neuroscientist), neurosurgeon, researcher and academic
- Leo Varadkar, 14th Prime Minister of Ireland (did internship in KEM Hospital)
- Sanjeev Kumar, former member of Bihar legislative assembly
