= Palayam, Kanyakumari =

Palayam
- village
- Location in Tamil Nadu, India
- Coordinates: 8.210°N 77.288°E
- Country: India
- State: Tamil Nadu
- District: Kanyakumari

Population (2001)
  - Total: 14,096

Languages
  - Official: Tamil
- Time zone: UTC+5:30 (IST)
- Postal code: 629804
- Vehicle registration: TN75

Palayam is a village in Kanyakumari district in the Indian state of Tamil Nadu. It was formerly in Kerala.

== Demographics ==
As of the 2001 Indian census, Palayam had a population of 14,096. 51% of the population is male and 49% is female. The average literacy rate in Palayam is 45%, lower than the national average of 59.5%: male literacy is 55%, and female literacy is 35%. In addition, 12% of the population in Palayam is under 6 years of age.
