= Nanavati hospital =

Private Hospital in India

Nanavati Max Super Speciality Hospital
- Max Healthcare Institute Limited
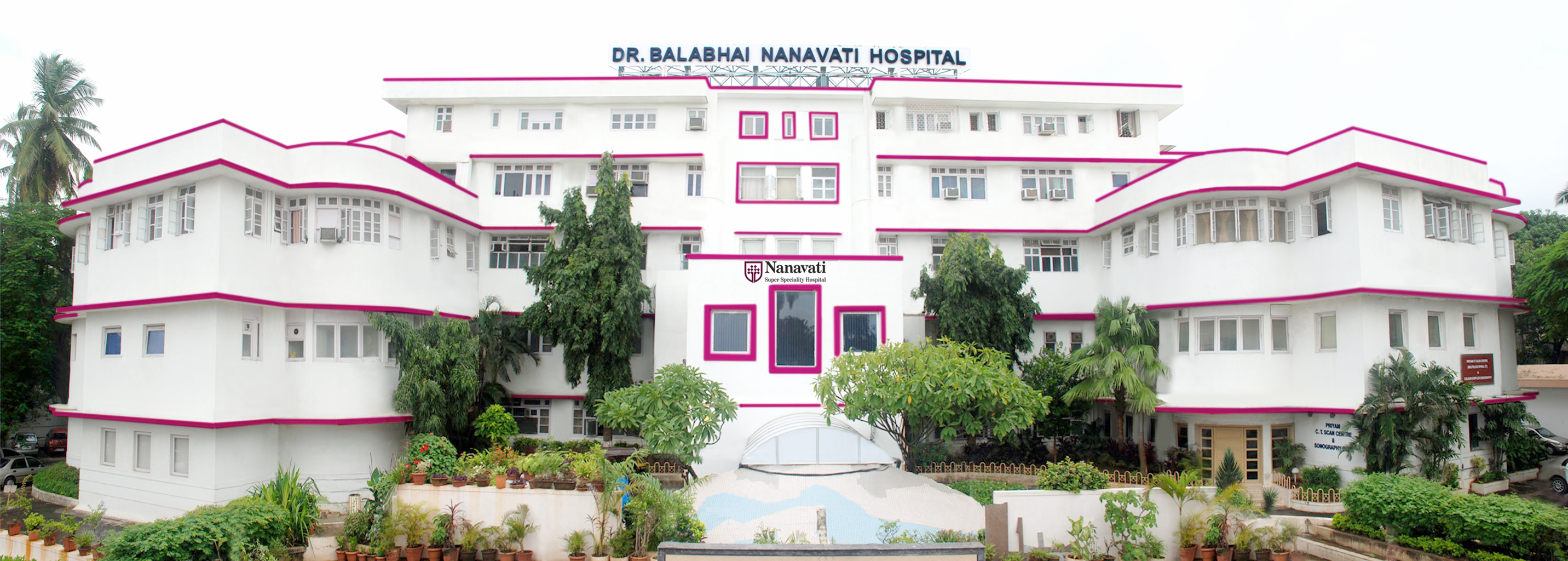

Geography
- Location: Vile Parle, Mumbai, India
- Coordinates: 19.095786°N 72.839986°E

Organisation
- Type: Super specialty hospital

Services
- Emergency department: Yes
- Beds: 350

History
- Opened: May 1951

Links
- Website: www.nanavatimaxhospital.org
- Lists: Hospitals in India

Nanavati Max Super Speciality Hospital, formerly known as Dr. Balabhai Nanavati Hospital, is a private hospital located in Vile Parle, Mumbai, India, which was inaugurated by Jawaharlal Nehru in November 1950 and opened in May 1951. Lately, Dr. Balabhai Nanavati Hospital was taken over by Radiant Group.

== History ==
The foundation stone at Dr. Balabhai Nanavati Hospital was laid by the Prime Minister Mr. Jawaharlal Nehru, in November 1950, and the hospital opened its doors to its first patient in May 1951.

== Centres of Excellence ==
The hospital has the following Centres of Excellence:

- Cancer Centre
- Centre for Bone marrow Transplant
- Centre for Children's Health
- Centre for Critical Care
- Centre for Digestive and Liver Diseases
- Heart Centre
- Centre for Neurosciences
- Centre for Orthopedics and Joint Replacement
- Centre for Plastic and Cosmetic surgery
- Centre for Renal Sciences & Kidney transplant
- Centre for Gastrointestinal (GI) Diseases

== Location ==
The hospital is located on SV Road, Near LIC Colony, Suresh Colony, Vile Parle West, Mumbai, Maharashtra.
