= Dr. B. C. Roy Award =

Indian medical award

Dr. B. C. Roy National Award
- Awarded for: achievements in the medical field
- Sponsored by: Government of India
- Date: 1973
- Country: India
- Rewards: ₹1 lakh (US$1,100) and a silver medal
- Website: www.nmc.org.in/awards/dr-b-c-roy-award/

The Bidhan Chandra Roy Award is an award instituted in 1962 in memory of Bidhan Chandra Roy by the National Medical Commission. It is presented by the President of India in New Delhi every year on July 1, the National Doctors' Day. It is also the highest honour that can be achieved by a doctor in India.

The award is given annually in each of the following categories:

- Statesmanship of the Highest Order in India.
- Medical Statesman,
- Eminent Medical Person,
- Eminent person in Philosophy,
- Eminent person in Science
- Eminent person in Arts.

It was first awarded in 1971 to Dr. M.N. Sarkar of Calcutta National Medical Medical College, Calcutta (earlier referred to as the Calcutta National Medical Institute), by V. V. Giri, the then President of India.

== Recipients ==
=== 1970s ===
- Dr. M.N. Sarkar (1971)
- Sandip Mukharji (1973)
- Arthur Saravanamuthu Thambiah (1978)
- Nagarur Gopinath (1978)
- M.P MEHREY(1972)
- Vikram Marwah (1979)

=== 1980s ===
- M.N. Ghosh (1980)
- J G Jolly (1981)
- S. P. Gupta M.D., FAMS (1983)
- Om Dutt Gulati (1981)
- M. M. S. Ahuja (1982)
- Perugu Siva Reddy (1982)
- Prabhu Dayal Nigam (1983)
- Prem Nath Wahi (1984)
- M. Khalilullah (1984), Padma Bhushan and Padma Shri recipient
- Jagjit Singh Chopra (1986)
- Sunkara Balaparameswara Rao
- Atluri Sriman Narayana (1989)
- Dinesh K. Bhargava (1989)

=== 1992 ===
- A.N. Chandrasekaran, rheumatologist
- Dr. Livtar Singh Chawla (1992), Eminent Medical Teacher

=== 1993 ===
- Kirpal Singh Chugh
- Pinnamaneni Narasimharao, Vijayawada, A.P

=== 1994 ===
- M.L. Kulkarni, Pediatrician and Geneticist
- V. S. Natarajan - Geriatric physician
- Daljit Singh, Ophthalmologist
- Hanumantha Rao Pasupuleti, Pediatrician, Rehab Psychologist
- Rattan Lal Mittal, Orthopedic surgeon

=== 1995 ===
- P. V. Chalapathi Rao, General Surgeon
- Sivapatham Vittal, Surgical endocrinologist

=== 1996 ===
- Wilfred de Souza
- Mathew Samuel Kalarickal

=== 1997 ===
- G. B. Parulkar
- N. A. Jadhav, Professor and Head of the Department of Medicine Mysore Medical College, Mysuru

=== 1998 ===
- Arjunan Rajasekaran, Urologist and Padma Shri recipient
- Shashanka Mohan Bose, General Surgeon, Chandigarh
- S. Kantha, Former First Vice Chancellor of Rajiv Gandhi University of Health Sciences

=== 1999 ===
- Belle Monappa Hegde
- K.A. Ashok Pai
- Upendra Kaul
- B. C. Das
- Farooq Abdullah
- Shivadeo S. Bapat, Urologist, Pune

=== 2000 ===
- S.Arulrhaj - Tuticorin, Tamil Nadu, India.
- Manju Gita Mishra, Patna, Bihar, India.
- Shashanka Mohan Bose, General Surgeon, Chandigarh

=== 2001 ===
- I. Sathyamurthy
- MayilVahanan Natarajan
- S. K. Sama

=== 2002 ===
- Nilima Arun Kshirsagar
- V. V. Radhakrishnan, S. P. Agarwal, C. P. Thakur, S. K. Sharma, G. Venkataswamy, Govind Swarup, Gourie Devi, T. R. Anantharaman, and Obaid Siddiqi
- K. K. Talwar, Mukkai Kesavan Lalitha, Jai Dev Wig, Rakesh Tandon and C. V. Bhirmanandham
- Abraham G. Thomas, Ashok Panagariya, and Saroj Chooramani Gopal
- Sanjiv Malik and A. K. Kesanna
- N. K. Venkataramana
- Narayana Panicker Kochupillai
- Laxmi Chand Gupta

=== 2003 - 2004 ===
- Purshotam Lal
- Vinay Kumar Kapoor
- V. K. Puri
- M. C. Pant
- Shally Awasthi
- T. V. Devarajan
- Sunil Pradhan

=== 2005 - 2013 ===
- Amrinder Jit Kanwar, Murugunathan A
- V. Mohan, Naresh Trehan, K. K. Aggarwal, Ajay Kumar, Anoop Misra and Lalit Kumar, S. M. Balaji, N. K. Pandey
- Yogesh Kumar Chawla, Rayapu Ramesh Babu, P. K. Bilwani and Prakash B. Behere
- Amit Banerjee
- P. Varalakshmi, R. K. Dhiman and S. R. Mittal
- Anupam Sachdeva, Alka Kriplani, A. K. Mahapatra, Drupad Nautamlal Chhatrapati, and Ganesh Gopalakrishnan
- Nikhil C. Munshi
- Tejas Patel
- Nikhil Tandon
- Kodaganur S. Gopinath
- H. Sudarshan Ballal (2010), Nephrologist, Director & Chairman of Manipal Hospitals Group
- Milind Vasant Kirtane
- Mahesh Verma
- Kumar L. Pradhan
- Sanjeev Bagai
- Gurpreet Singh Wander
- C. V. Harinarayan,- Sakra World Hospital
- Moti Lal Singh M.S. FRCS (London) FRCS (Edin) - Patna
- Dr. C. Palanivelu – Recognized under the specialty development category for laparoscopic surgery.

=== 2014 ===
Eminent Medical Person:

- Anand B. R., Former Chief Medical Officer, Indian Railways, Mysore.
- Arvind Kumar, Sir Ganga Ram Hospital, New Delhi;
- Randeep Guleria, AIIMS, New Delhi.

Eminent Medical Teacher:

- Ravi Kant, Lucknow
- Ashwani Kumar, New Delhi
- Rajesh Malhotra, New Delhi
- Rakesh Yadav, New Delhi
- P.V.L.N. Murthy, Hyderabad.

Best talents in encouraging the development of specialities in different branches in Medicine:

- Janak Desai, Ahmedabad
- Rajesh Upadhyay, New Delhi
- Binay Karak, Patna
- Ashok Rajgopal, Gurgaon
- Davinder Singh Rana, New Delhi.

Outstanding services in the field of Sociomedical Relief:

- Rama Reddy Karri, Rajamahendravaram (AP);
- Jitender B Patel, Ahmedabad;
- Sudipto Roy, Kolkata.

=== 2015 ===
Eminent Medical Person:

- C. Palanivelu, GEM Institute for Gastrointestinal Disease, Coimbatore;
- Ashok Seth, Fortis Escorts Heart Institute & Research Center, New Delhi.

Eminent Medical Teacher:

- Dr. Livtar Singh Chawla
- N. Sanjeeva Reddy, Chennai;
- C.S. Yadav, New Delhi;
- A.K. Bisoi, New Delhi;
- D.J. Borah, Guwahati;
- Arun Thakur, Patna.

Best talents in encouraging the development of specialities in different branches in Medicine:

- H. P. Bhalodiya, Ahmedabad;
- Parimal M. Desai, Ahmedabad;
- Anand Khakhar, Chennai;
- Ambrish Mittal, New Delhi;
- Amlesh Seth, New Delhi.

Outstanding service in the field of Socio Medical Relief:

- A. Marthanda Pillai, Thiruvananthapuram;
- John Ebnezar, Bangalore;
- A. Arulvisagan, Puducherry.

Aid or Assistance to Research Project:

- J.B. Sharma, New Delhi.

=== 2016 ===
Eminent Medical Person:

- Vipul R. Patel
- Neelam Mohan, ISB Alumni - AMPH Co 2020

Eminent Person - Literature:

- Anil Kumar Chaturvedi

Eminent Medical Teacher:

- Prem Nath Dogra
- Unnikrishnan
- G. S. Umamaheshwara Rao
- Ved Prakash Mishra
- Rajeshwar Dayal

Best Talents in Encouraging the Development of Specialties in Different Branches in Medicines:

- Sanjay Balwant Kulkarni
- O. P. Yadava
- Pawanindra Lal
- D. Raghunadharao
- Pradeep Tandon
- G. Venugopala Rao

Outstanding Service in the field of Socio Medical Relief:

- T Rajagopal
- Satchit Balsari
- S. Geethalakshmi - Tamil Nadu Dr. M.G.R. Medical University - Vice Chancellor
- Devraj Rai
- Pallarisetti Raghu Ram
- Karri Rama Reddy (Rajahmundry), award received in the year 2017 for Service of Socio Medical Relief for the year 2014.

Aid or Assistance to Research Project:

- Punit Gupta

=== 2017 ===
- M.L.B. Bhatt, Vice Chancellor, K. G. Medical university, Lucknow under the category of Eminent Medical Teacher.
- Syed Sanaullah Mohd Tabish, AIIMS, New Delhi
- Avinash Supe, Seth GSMC, Mumbai (Teaching Category)
- Rashmi Kaur, PGI, Chandigarh
- Amit Singh, Bihar
- Farheen Zuber Patel, Gujarat
- Kanu Bhatia, Mumbai
- S.P. Bhatt, Surat
- Suman Prasad, AIIMS, New Delhi
- Satchit Balsari, Boston, USA

=== 2018 ===
Eminent Medical Person:

- H. S. Shashidhar (Medical Director, Manasa group of hospitals Karnataka)
- B. K. Misra - Chairman of Neurosurgery, Hinduja Hospitals

Outstanding service in the field of socio medical relief

- P Raghu. Ram
- H. R. Surendra, MBBS, MS (ophthalmology)
- Kirit Premjibhai Solanki, MBBS, MS (General Surgery), FICS. Ex Professor of Surgery V S Hospital Ahmedabad (He is currently 2nd term Member of Parliament from Ahmedabad West constituency Gujarat)

Best talents in encouraging the development of specialties in different branches in Medicine

- Sanjay Desai

== See also ==
- List of medicine awards
