= Jayadeep Patra =

Canadian epidemiologist and public health researcher

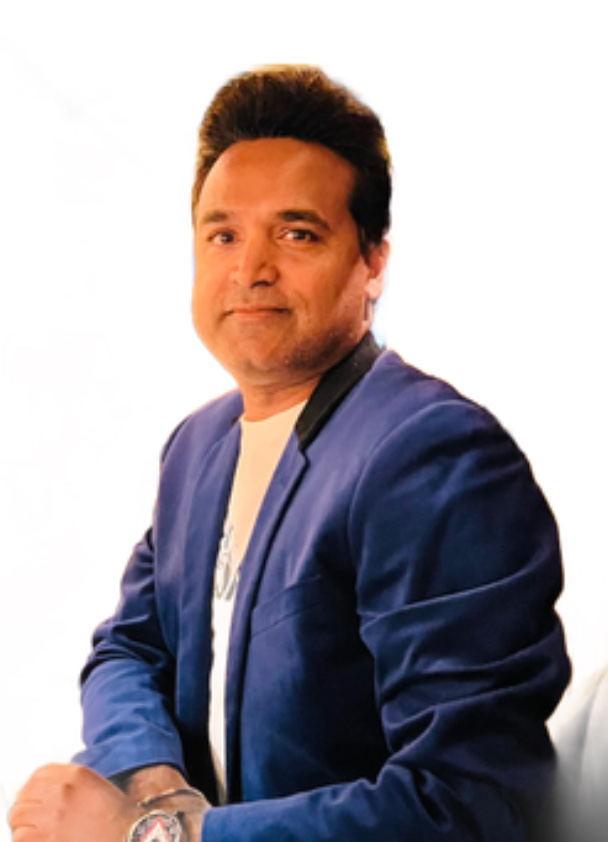
- Born: 1977 (age 48–49); Cuttack, India
- Education: Utkal University, University of Toronto
- Known for: Global health, Alcohol research, Tuberculosis research
- Scientific career
- Fields: Epidemiology, Public Health, Developmental Psychology
- Workplaces: Centre for Addiction and Mental Health, University of Toronto
- Doctoral advisor: Jurgen Rehm

Jayadeep Patra (also known as Jay Patra) (born 1977, in Cuttack, India) ) is a Canadian epidemiologist, public health researcher, and academic whose work focuses on global health, alcohol epidemiology, tuberculosis, meta-analysis, developmental psychology, and population health. He is a collaborator scientist at the Centre for Addiction and Mental Health (CAMH) in Toronto and a professor at the Dalla Lana School of Public Health at the University of Toronto. His research has contributed to international studies on alcohol-related disease burden, tobacco exposure, tuberculosis, and chronic disease epidemiology.

== Early life and education ==
Patra was born in Cuttack, Odisha, India. He earned a Bachelor of Science degree in Psychology and Statistics in 1996 and a Master of Arts degree in Psychology in 1998 from Utkal University. After moving to Canada, he completed a Master of Arts in Human Development and Applied Psychology at the University of Toronto in 2001. He subsequently obtained a Ph.D. in Developmental Psychology and Public Health from the Ontario Institute for Studies in Education (OISE), University of Toronto, in 2007 under the supervision of epidemiologist Jürgen Rehm. From 2012 to 2016, Patra completed postdoctoral research at the Centre for Global Health Research at St. Michael's Hospital in Toronto, where he worked with epidemiologist Prabhat Jha on studies addressing mortality, chronic disease, and global health.

== Career ==
Patra has held research and academic appointments at the Centre for Addiction and Mental Health (CAMH) and the University of Toronto. His work has focused on epidemiology, addiction, global health, and public health policy, with particular emphasis on alcohol-related disease burden, tuberculosis, tobacco exposure, and chronic disease epidemiology.

He has contributed to international collaborative studies examining alcohol-attributable disease, systematic reviews and meta-analyses, and the epidemiology of communicable and non-communicable diseases. His research has also formed part of the Million Death Study and other global health initiatives investigating mortality patterns in low- and middle-income countries. In addition to his research, Patra has served as an Associate Editor of BMC Public Health and an Academic Editor for PLOS ONE. Patra has authored or co-authored more than 100 peer-reviewed publications in epidemiology, public health, and addiction research. His publications include collaborative studies in journals such as The Lancet, Addiction, BMC Public Health, and the International Journal of Epidemiology. His research interests include alcohol epidemiology, global burden of disease, tuberculosis, tobacco control, evidence synthesis, geographical access to healthcare, and population health.

=== Hospitality and entrepreneurship ===
In addition to his career in public health research, Jayadeep Patra is a Canadian restaurateur and hospitality entrepreneur. He founded the Indian restaurants Bar Goa and ROOH in Toronto. His work in hospitality focuses on contemporary Indian cuisine and integrating principles of health, sustainability, and culinary innovation. Bar Goa received recognition in the Michelin Guide, and ROOH expanded his portfolio of Indian fine dining concepts.

Patra is also a franchise owner and operator of restaurants under the Chop Steakhouse & Bar and Moxies brands in Canada. The Chop and Moxies brands are owned by Northland Properties and are operated through corporate and franchise locations.

== Selected publications ==
Patra has authored over 100 publications, including:

- Patra, J. et al. (2021). Impact of body mass and alcohol consumption on all-cause and liver mortality in 240,000 adults in the United States. Drug Alcohol Rev, 40(6): 1061-1070.
- Lim, S.S. et al. (2013). A comparative risk assessment of burden of disease and injury attributable to 67 risk factors... Lancet, 380(9859): 2224-60. (Cited 16,222 times)
- Rehm, J. et al. (2009). Global burden of disease and injury and economic cost attributable to alcohol use and alcohol-use disorders. Lancet, 373(9682): 2223–33. (Cited 4,655 times)
- Patra, J. et al. (2025) Treatment outcomes among children and adolescents with extensively drug–resistant (XDR) and pre–XDR tuberculosis: Systematic review and meta–analysis. PLOS Glob Public Health 5(1): e0003754. doi:10.1371/journal.pgph.0003754
- Patra J, et al. (2015) Exposure to Second-Hand Smoke and the Risk of Tuberculosis in Children and Adults: A Systematic Review and Meta-Analysis of 18 Observational Studies. PLoS Med 12(6): e1001835. doi:10.1371/journal.pmed.1001835

== See also ==
- Centre for Addiction and Mental Health
- Global Burden of Disease Study
- Million Death Study
