= Mathew Kalarickal =

Indian cardiologist (1948–2025)

Mathew Samuel Kalarickal
- Born: 6 January 1948; Kottayam, Travancore, India
- Died: 18 April 2025 (aged 77); Chennai, Tamil Nadu, India
- Occupation: Interventional cardiologist
- Awards: Padmashri; Dr. B. C. Roy Award; Doctor of Science Award

Mathew Samuel Kalarickal (6 January 1948 – 18 April 2025) was an Indian cardiologist widely known as the father of angioplasty in India. He specialised in coronary angioplasty, carotid stenting, coronary stenting and rotablator atherectomy.

== Early life ==
Kalarickal was born on 6 January 1948 in Kottayam, Travancore (now in Kerala). He studied at Union Christian College, Aluva. Subsequently, he obtained his MBBS degree from Government Medical College, Kottayam in 1974, his MD from Stanley Medical College, Chennai (then called Madras) in 1978 and his DM in 1981 from Madras Medical College, Chennai.

== Career ==
After starting his career in India, Kalarickal moved to Jakarta to work at Medistra Hospital. Later, he moved to Oman to work as a cardiologist at the Royal Hospital, Muscat. He continued his practice in the United States only to return to India in 1985 after training there under Andreas Grüntzig, who was known as the father of coronary angioplasty, and joined Apollo Hospitals in Chennai.

== Positions held ==
Kalarickal was the Director, Interventional Cardiology and Cardiac Catheterisation Laboratories, Apollo Hospitals, Chennai. He was also a visiting Interventional Cardiologist at hospitals in different parts of India. He was the founder-convenor of the National Angioplasty Registry of India, which is a forum for interventional cardiologists of the country to learn from each other, streamline the standard of procedure and maintain international standards. Kalarickal was the President, Asian-Pacific Society of Interventional Cardiology, from 1995 to 1997 and Chairman of Interventional Cardiology, Asian-Pacific Society of Cardiology, from 1995 to 1999.

== Death ==
Kalarickal died at Apollo Hospital in Chennai on 18 April 2025, at the age of 77.

== Awards and recognitions ==
- Doctor of Science Award by the Dr. M.G.R. University in 2003
- Padmashri by the President of India in 2000
- Dr. B. C. Roy Award in Interventional Cardiology in 1996
- "Rashtriya Samman" (top tax payers award) in 2000
