= Prabhat Jha =

Prabhat Jha may refer to:

- Prabhat Jha (epidemiologist) (born 1965), Indian-Canadian epidemiologist and health economist
- Prabhat Jha (politician) (born 1957), Indian politician
