= J. G. Jolly =

Indian physician and professor

- J. G. Jolly
- Born: 1 October 1926
- Died: 5 October 2013 (aged 87)
- Education: Lucknow University
- Known for: Blood banking Blood transfusions
- Scientific career
- Fields: Medicine
- Workplaces: PGI Chandigarh SGPGIMS Lucknow GMCH Chandigarh

Jai Gopal Jolly (born 1 October 1926) was an Indian physician and professor of the Department of Transfusion Medicine at the Post Graduate Institute of Medical Education and Research, Chandigarh, India. He is an internationally known expert in the field of blood transfusion, who pioneered the voluntary blood donation movement in India, and is regarded as the "Father of Transfusion Medicine in India". He spearheaded the campaign to prohibit sale and purchase of blood from professional donors in India, which was later incorporated into the National Blood Policy of India by the Government of India. He has generated awareness among the masses about the significance of blood donation programmes by observing "Blood Donation Day" on 1 October. This has helped in obtaining adequate quantity of quality blood from voluntary donors.

== History ==
He was the founder of the Blood Bank Society, Chandigarh, founder President of Indian Society of Blood Transfusion and Immunohaematology and made significant contributions to the development of Blood programme in India. As a result of his contributions, he represented India in numerous International Delegations as well as scientific conferences. During the course of these visits he got the opportunity of studying the blood transfusion programme in different parts of the world for revamping the organisational set up in India.

On the completion of his assignment at the PGI, Chandigarh he joined SGPGI Lucknow to establish a department of excellence where he introduced postgraduate degrees in Transfusion Medicine for the first time in India. He then provided consultation to the Government Medical College, Chandiagrh.

During the recent years, he has been concentrating his activities primarily towards the academic development of transfusion medicine and to provide free factors to haemophiliacs. He has also advocated "screening of parents and unborn babies for thalassaemia in India". He has emphasised the need for the provision of more and advanced facilities for the preparation of blood components in India. He has worked to meeting blood requirement during disasters. Being associated with the National and State Blood Transfusion Councils of Punjab, Haryana and Chandigarh he has continued his efforts in the development of Transfusion services in the region. He was also instrumental in setting up a department of Transfusion Medicine, having well established units for blood components at the newly established Government Medical College, Chandigarh. As an international expert on Blood Transfusion Medicine, he has reviewed Strategies for Safe Blood Transfusion for the World Health Organization, and has written over 100 scientific articles in international journals.

As a result of his many contributions in this field, Jolly is recognised as the leader of blood banking in India. Among the numerous distinctions conferred on Jolly are the J. G. Mukherjee gold medal by the Lucknow University for distinguished research contribution (1958), Dr. B. C. Roy Award for the development of the speciality of Blood Transfusion in India (1981), Philip Levine Memorial Award for national contributions in Transfusion Medicine (1993) and IDPL Diamond Jubilee IMA Oration Award (1996). He was also awarded by The Chandigarh Administration on the Republic Day of India for social service and illustrious achievements in the field of blood donation. Jolly's continuous efforts helped the speciality of blood transfusion to begin to be recognised in India. He has been accorded recognition by the World Health Organization, International Society of Blood Transfusion and World Federation of Hemophilia.
