= Samuel J. Clark =

- Born: 1969 (age 56–57); Kenya
- Known for: openVA
- Scientific career
- Institutions: University of Colorado at Boulder, University of Washington, The Ohio State University
- Thesis: An Investigation into the Impact of HIV on Population Dynamics in Africa (2001)
- Doctoral advisor: Samuel H. Preston
- Website: samclark.net

Samuel J. "Sam" Clark is a demographer with expertise in epidemiology and data science. He has worked as a professor in the Department of Sociology at The Ohio State University and the Department of Sociology at the University of Washington. He is an expert on ascertaining cause of death using verbal autopsy.

== Education ==
Clark earned B.S. degrees in engineering and biology from the California Institute of Technology (Caltech) in 1993 and Masters and Ph.D. degrees in demography from the University of Pennsylvania in 1995 and 2001, respectively. His Ph.D. titled "An Investigation into the Impact of HIV on Population Dynamics in Africa" was supervised by Samuel H. Preston.

== Career ==
In 2000, Clark started a five-year postdoc at the Institute of Behavioral Science (IBS), University of Colorado at Boulder. During that time he worked with the Agincourt Health and Demographic Surveillance Site in South Africa and the INDEPTH Network of health and demographic surveillance sites in Africa and Asia. He worked to maintain and grow both the site and the network and to investigate population and health issues affecting Africans. In 2005, Clark joined the faculty of the University of Washington as an assistant professor in the Department of Sociology and was promoted to associate professor in 2011. In 2016, he was promoted to full professor and moved to the Department of Sociology at The Ohio State University. Clark has published more than 100 peer-reviewed journal articles, book chapters, and comments, and his combined work has been cited more than 5,000 times.

== Research ==
Clark's research explores the epi-demographic history of populations living in Africa and develops new mathematical and statistical methods for demography and epidemiology. He has contributed to UNICEF's subnational estimates of child mortality and the United Nations Population Division's World Population Prospects global demographic estimates and projections.

=== openVA ===
Clark leads the openVA Team that develops new computational and statistical methods (e.g. InSilicoVA) to automate cause of death ascertainment using data from verbal autopsy and develops tools to integrate automated verbal autopsy methods into large-scale routine vital statistics systems.

The openVA suite is freely available, open-source software that implements all commonly used tools to automate cause ascertainment using data from verbal autopsy interviews. The openVA Pipeline integrates the cause-ascertainment algorithms into an automated workflow that moves deaths with verbal autopsy from an Open Data Kit (ODK) server through cause assignment and on to the District Health Information System version 2 (DHIS-2). The data are collected using ODK and provided to a variety of users and policymakers through dashboards by DHIS-2. It is feasible for countries without traditional vital statistics systems to implement verbal autopsy and use these tools to fully automate cause ascertainment and descriptive analysis of the burden of disease.
