= GMCH (disambiguation) =

GMCH may refer to:

- GMCH Chandigarh, a government teaching hospital in Chandigarh, India
- Gauhati Medical College and Hospital, Assam
- General Motors Components Holdings - Holding company of GM for components businesses, some which were re-acquired from Delphi Corporation
- Northbridge (computing) - Integrated video controllers also known as Graphics and Memory Controller Hub.
