= Satya Paul Agarwal =

Indian neurosurgeon

- Born: Nakodar, Punjab, India
- Occupation: Neurosurgeon
- Awards: Padma Bhushan; Dr. B. C. Roy Award

Satya Paul Agarwal was an Indian neurosurgeon, academician, and public health administrator. He was the incumbent Secretary General of the Indian Red Cross Society. The Government of India honoured him in 2010, with the Padma Bhushan, the third highest civilian award, for his services to the fields of medicine and public health.

Agarwal had been active during several disaster relief operation such as epidemic control activities and the tsunami of 2004 for which he was awarded the Henry Dunant Medal. He had also written several books and articles. He was the spokesperson for the Red Cross and Red Crescent Statutory Meetings on Health and access to safe water and improved sanitation. He had delivered several lectures and keynote addresses in seminars and conferences.

== Positions ==
More than 80% of dental surgeons are catering to the needs of 20% of the population in urban areas, while almost no dental treatment facilities are available to 80% of the population living in the rural areas, says Dr. Satya Paul Agarwal, on the new initiative by the Government of India, We envisage implementation of the oral health project right down to village level.

- Secretary General of the Indian Red Cross Society – 2005 onwards
- Chair of the IFRC Advisory Body on Sustainable Development and Health – International Federation of Red Cross and Red Crescent
- Director General of Health Services, Government of India – 1996 to 2005
- President – Tuberculosis Association of India (TAI)

== Awards and recognitions ==
- Padma Bhushan – 2010
- DSc – Punjab University – 2007
- Life Time Achievement Award for TB – 2005
- Dr. B. C. Roy National Award for the Eminent Medical Person – 2002
- Henry Dunant Medal – International Red Cross and Red Crescent Movement
- Belgian Redcross Flanders Gold Medal, 2014 – Belgian Redcross Flanders

== Bibliography ==
- Agarwal, Satya P.; Urmila Agarwal (2014). Anu-Gita in the Mahabharata: Re-affirming Bhagavad-Gita's Message of Good-of-all. Self-published (USA). ISBN 9780991440009.
- ———————— (1998). The Social Role of the Gita: How and Why. Motilal Banarsidass. ISBN 9788120815247.
- ———————— (2002). Selections from the Mahabharata (Re-affirming Gita's Call for the Good of All). Motilal Banarsidass. ISBN 9788120818743.
- ———————— (2000). The Gita and Tulasi Ramayana: Their Common Call for the Good of All. Motilal Banarsidass. ISBN 9788120817524.
- ————————; Urmila Agarwal (2015). Practical Vedanta Movement (Prasthanatraya Widened to "Panch-Shastra"). New Age Books. ISBN 9788178224770.
- ———————— (1998). Manas evam Gita: Lokmangal-Gunjita (in Hindi). Motilal Banarsidass. ISBN 9788120816404.

== Writings ==
- Dr. Satya Paul (1 April 2006). Analogy of Pain: 1. B. Jain Publishers. p. 386. ISBN 978-8180562440.
