= Thenumgal Poulose Jacob =

Indian surgeon

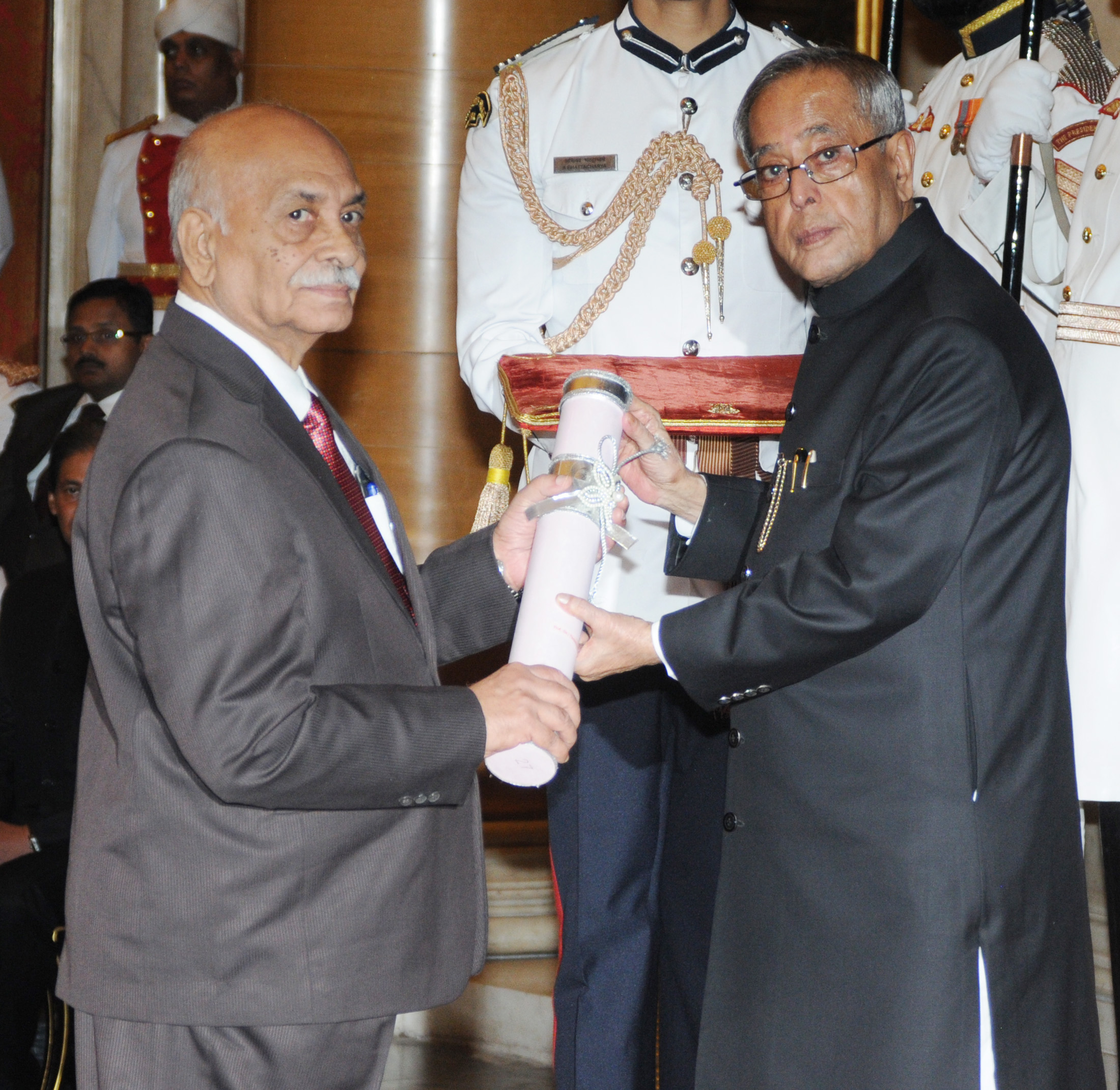
- Born: 12 June 1934; Aluva, Kerala, India
- Died: 22 November 2024 (aged 90); Chennai, India
- Occupation: Surgeon
- Known for: Vascular surgery
- Spouse: Esther
- Children: Hasum Jacob Thenumgal; Siji Jacob
- Parent(s): Thenumgal Poulose; Mariam
- Awards: Padma Shri

Thenumgal Poulose Jacob was an Indian surgeon specializing in vascular surgery, and the founder Head of the Department of Vascular Surgery at Madras Medical College. Born in Aluva, in the south Indian state of Kerala, to Thenumgal Poulose and Mariam in a Malayali family, he did his under-graduate studies at UC College before graduating in medicine from Stanley Medical College, Chennai, and secured his MS degree from the same institution. He started his practice under government service at Madras Medical College where he helped establish the department of vascular surgery in 1978 and served as its founder head until his superannuation in 1993. The Government of India awarded him the fourth highest civilian honour of the Padma Shri, in 2014, for his contributions to medical science. He is married to Esther and the couple has a daughter, Siji Jacob, an academic and a son, Hasum Jacob Thenumgal, an engineer at TCS. He is in private practice at T. P. Jacob Clinic in Royapuram, Chennai and is also a consultant vascular surgeon at MV Hospitals for Diabetes, Royapuram.

== See also ==
- Vascular surgery
