= Anoop Misra =

Indian endocrinologist

- Born: India
- Education: AIIMS New Delhi
- Occupation: Endocrinologist
- Known for: Diabetology
- Awards: Padma Shri; Dr. B. C. Roy Award; IIE Bharat Shiromani Puruskar; Rotary Award for the Excellence; Spirit of Humanity Award; Swastha Bharat Samman
- Website: anoopmisra.com

Anoop Misra is an Indian endocrinologist and a former honorary physician to the Prime Minister of India. He serves the chairman of the Fortis Centre for Diabetes, Obesity and Cholesterol (C-DOC) and heads the National Diabetes Obesity and Cholesterol Foundation (NDOC). A former Fellow of the World Health Organization at the Royal Free Hospital in the United Kingdom, Misra has made significant contributions to the study of diabetes and obesity in the Indian population. He is a recipient of the Dr. B. C. Roy Award, India's highest medical honor, and was awarded the Padma Shri by the Government of India in 2007 for his contributions to medicine.

== Early life ==
Misra completed his MBBS and MD in Internal Medicine from the All India Institute of Medical Sciences (AIIMS), New Delhi. He pursued further research and training abroad as a WHO Fellow at the Royal Free Hospital, UK, and later worked at the University of Texas Southwestern Medical Center, Department of Endocrinology and Human Nutrition, USA.

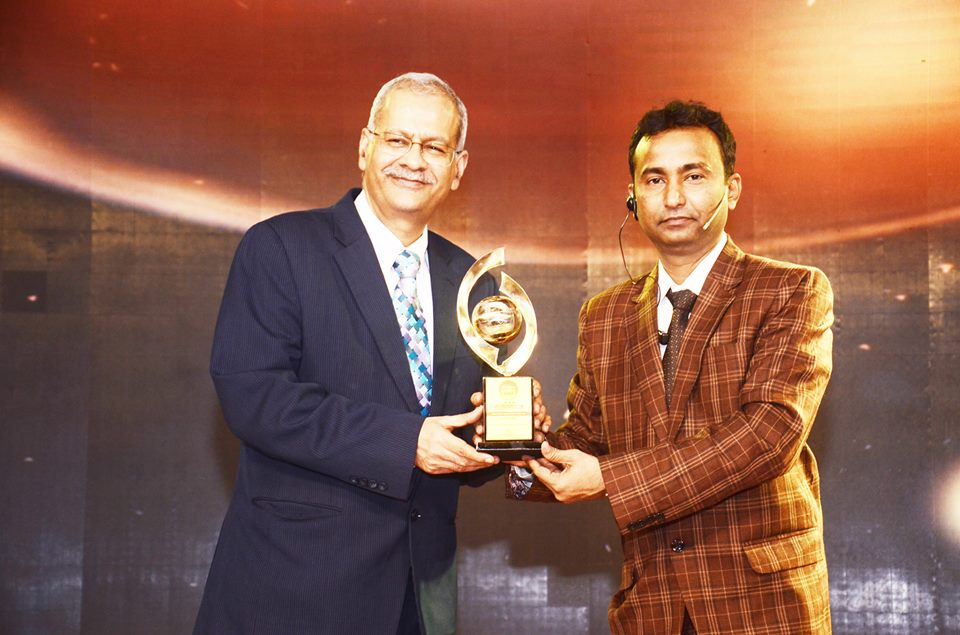
Dr. Anoop Misra with Pharma Leaders Founder Chairman Satya Brahma receiving the coveted honor.

== Career ==
After returning to India, Misra joined AIIMS Delhi, where he worked for a decade and headed the Diabetes and Metabolism Group and the Clinical Pharmacology Unit. He later joined Fortis Rajan Dhall Hospital as the director of the Department of Diabetes and Metabolic Diseases.

He has also served as adjunct faculty at the Indian Institute of Advanced Research, Gandhinagar. Currently, he chairs the Fortis C-DOC Centre for Diabetes, Obesity and Cholesterol, a specialized institution focusing on metabolic disorders, and leads the National Diabetes, Obesity and Cholesterol Foundation (NDOC).

== Research and contributions ==
Misra is known to have been involved in advanced research in the fields of diabetes and obesity and is reported to have introduced novel definitions for obesity. His research interests included abdominal obesity and Syndrome X in Indians and is credited with development of dietary and exercise guidelines for Indians. His group has worked extensively on body fat depots, specifically hepatic and pancreatic fat, and their relationship with insulin resistance and the metabolic syndrome in Indian population. He has also conducted several intervention trials with nuts, edible oils and proteins in individuals having high risk for diabetes. He was a part of several research projects on the subject and his researches have been documented by way of over 300 articles published in peer reviewed journals. He is also associated with 15 scientific publications as a member of their editorial boards and has written editorials for The Lancet on three occasions. He is a member of the scientific advisory board of Elsevier and is the associate editor of Journal of Diabetes, European Journal of Clinical Nutrition and editor-in-chief of Diabetes and Metabolic Syndrome: Research and Reviews. Besides, he is a reviewer for over 30 journals including New England Journal of Medicine, Lancet, Circulation and The Journal of Clinical Endocrinology and Metabolism.

== Policy and advisory roles ==
Dr. Misra has been a member of several national and international health committees, including:

- National Program for Cancer, Diabetes, and Cardiovascular Diseases (CVD)
- WHO Expert Group on Childhood Obesity
- Indian Council of Medical Research (ICMR) Expert Committees on Fatty Liver, Gestational Diabetes, and Childhood Obesity
- Technical Advisory Group on Adolescent Health, Ministry of Health and Family Welfare, Government of India
- Governing Committee, National Institute of Nutrition
- Expert Committee, Drugs Controller General of India

Dr. Misra has served as Honorary Physician to two Indian Prime Ministers. He currently heads the Diabetes Certification Course at Fortis C-DOC, conducted in collaboration with the British Medical Journal (BMJ) and the Royal College of Physicians, London.

== Honors and awards ==
Misra has received numerous national and international awards, including:

- Dr. B. C. Roy Award (2006) – Highest Indian medical honor
- President’s Award of Excellence, Rotary International, South and East Delhi Chapter (2006)
- Padma Shri, Government of India (2007)
- Bharat Shiromani Puruskar, Indian Economics Institute (2009)
- Swastha Bharat Samman (2010)
- Spirit of Humanity Award, Americare Foundation (2010)
- Outstanding Investigator Award, World India Diabetes Foundation (2014)
- Pharma Leaders Indian of the Year – Endocrinology (2018)

He has also delivered several prestigious medical orations, including the Prof. Austin E. Doyle Oration, Dr. K. L. Wig Oration, V. Ramalingaswami Oration, and R. M. Shah Oration (2017).

== See also ==
- Diabetes
- Syndrome X (metabolic)
