= Arthur Saravanamuthu Thambiah =

Indian dermatologist (1924–2011)

- Born: 2 January 1924; India
- Died: 11 May 2011 (aged 87)
- Education: Madras Medical College (1948); St. John's Institute of Dermatology, London; University of Madras and the Tamil Nadu Dr. M. G. R. Medical University
- Awards: 1971 Dr. B. C. Roy Award, (1978); 1978 Gold medal, Royal College of Physicians, Edinburgh, 1978
- Scientific career
- Fields: Dermatology
- Workplaces: Madras Medical College; Tamil Nadu Government Medical Services

Arthur Saravanamuthu Thambiah (January 2, 1924 – May 11, 2011) was an Indian dermatologist. He has served as a doctor in Chennai Government General Hospital for more than 30 years. Thambiah served as the head of the Department of Dermatology for 21 years from 1961 to 1982. He has served a total of 60 years as dermatologist.

== Education and service ==
Tambaiah's parents are doctors. His mother Dr. Lily Enoch was the best outgoing lady student of Madras Medical College and his father Rao Bahadur Captain S. Thambiah was an IMS officer who served in the British Army. After graduation in MBBS from Madras Medical College, Chennai in 1946 and MRCP degree, he trained in dermatology in London. On completion of this training in 1951, he joined the Dermatology department at Madras Medical College. He became Professor of Dermatology in 1961. He had been posted as Dermatologist, Government General Hospital, Madras attached to Madras Medical College. He has the honour as the first person to obtain the Diploma and MD courses of the Madras University in 1962. Thambaiah retired from his government service in 1982.

== Awards ==
- Dr. B.C. Roy National Award, 1978
- Gold medal, Royal College of Physicians, Edinburgh, for his service as Overseas Regional Adviser from 1974 to 1998

== Death ==
Arthur Saravanamuthu Thambiah died on May 11, 2011 at Chennai after a brief illness.
