= Dinesh K. Bhargava =

Indian gastroenterologist

D. K. Bhargava
- Born: Rajasthan, India
- Occupations: Gastroenterologist; Medical academic
- Known for: Gastrointestinal endoscopy
- Awards: Padma Shri; Dr. B. C. Roy Award; ICMR Hari Om Ashram award ICMR Amrut Mody Unichem Prize; NAMS Dr. R. M. Kasliwal Award; ISG Olympus Mitra Award; ISG Searle Award

Dinesh K. Bhargava is an Indian gastroenterologist, medical academic and writer and a senior consultant at Indraprastha Apollo Hospital, Delhi. He is one of the pioneers of gastrointestinal endoscopy in India for which the Medical Council of India awarded him Dr. B. C. Roy Award, the highest Indian award in the medical category, in 1989. He is also a recipient of the civilian honor of the Padma Shri.

== Biography ==
A former professor at the All India Institute of Medical Sciences Delhi, Bhargava has published over 150 medical papers in peer-reviewed international journals and has served as an investigator in many clinical studies of the Indian Council of Medical Research. He is a member of the scientific advisory committee of the Centre for Liver and Biliary Surgery (CLBS) and a fellow of the American Gastroenterology Association (AGAF) and American College of Gastroenterology (FACG). He is a member and a former president of the Indian Society of Gastroenterology. The honors he has received include Dr. B. C. Roy Award, Hari Om Ashram award (1985) and Amrut Mody Unichem Prize (1989) of the Indian Council of Medical Research, Dr. R. M. Kasliwal Award of the National Academy of Medical Sciences (1989), and Olympus Mitra Award (1984) and Searle Award (1989) of the Indian Society of Gastroenterology (1989). The Government of India awarded him the fourth highest civilian honour of the Padma Shri, in 2008, for his contributions to medical science.

== Selected bibliography ==
- Divij Mehta, DK Bhargava (December 2010). "Non-steroidal Anti Inflammatory Drugs and Gastrointestinal Toxicity". Apollo Medicine. 7 (4): 251–262. doi:10.1016/S0976-0016(12)60018-0.
- D. K. Bhargava, Y. Chawla (May 1983). "Intermittent unexplained rectal bleeding in childhood". The Indian Journal of Pediatrics. 50 (3): 329–332. doi:10.1007/BF02752772. PMID 6607886. S2CID 35541078.
- D.K. Bhargava; M. Gupta; S. Nijhawan; S. Dasarathy; A.K.S. Kushwaha (June 1990). "Adenosine deaminase (ADA) in peritoneal tuberculosis: Diagnostic value in ascitic fluid and serum". Tuberculosis. 71 (2): 121–126. doi:10.1016/0041-3879(90)90007-U. PMID 2219461.

== See also ==
- Apollo Hospital, Indraprastha
