= Jagjit Singh Chopra =

Indian neurologist, medical writer, academic

- Born: 15 June 1935; India
- Died: 18 January 2019 (aged 83)
- Occupations: Neurologist; Medical writer
- Known for: Founder of the department of neurology at PGIMER
- Awards: Padma Bhushan; B. C. Roy Award; ICMR Amrut Mody Research Award

Jagjit Singh Chopra (15 June 1935 – 18 January 2019) was an Indian neurologist, medical writer and an Emeritus Professor of the Department of Neurology at the Post Graduate Institute of Medical Education and Research (PGIMER).

He was the founder-principal of the Government Medical College and Hospital, Chandigarh, and a past president of the Indian Academy of Neurology.

He authored the book Neurology in Tropics, which is a compilation of contributions from 146 neurologists.

== Life ==
Chopra was elected by the National Academy of Medical Sciences as a fellow in 1980 and six years later, he received the B. C. Roy Award, the highest Indian honor in the medical category. He delivered several award orations such as those for Dr. R. S. Allison Oration and M. S. Sen Award Oration of the Indian Council of Medical Research (ICMR) and was also a recipient of Amrut Mody Research Award of ICMR (1981). The Government of India awarded him the third highest civilian honour of the Padma Bhushan, in 2008, for his contributions to Indian medicine. He was also a recipient of the Lifetime Achievement Award of Madras Neuro Trust.

== Death ==
After suffering from a stroke at Chandigarh, despite attempts to save him for a month at the ICU unit, Chopra died on 19 January 2019.
