= Million Death Study =

The Million Death Study (MDS) is a study of premature human mortality conducted in India. It began in 1998 and ended in 2014 . Among a sample size of 14 million Indians, approximately 1 million deaths are assigned as medical causes through the Verbal Autopsy method to determine disease patterns and direct public health policy. The principal investigator of the study is Dr. Prabhat Jha, director of the Centre for Global Health Research and professor of epidemiology at the Dalla Lana School of Public Health, University of Toronto, Canada.

== Context ==
In India, like many low and middle-income countries, the vast majority of deaths occur at home without medical attention (over 75%), rather than with the standard of hospital care and supervision common in high-income countries before death. As a result, estimates suggest a majority of the approximately 60 million global annual deaths, and specifically over half of the Indian at-home deaths, are undocumented and do not have a medically certified cause of death. Deaths occurring in hospitals may be documented with official death certificates issued by medical professionals. The MDS was conceived to study previously undocumented at-home deaths to gain a more statistically representative understanding of disease patterns in India.

== Methodology ==
Between the study period of 1998-2014, the MDS investigators collaborated with the Registrar General of India to monitor approximately 14 million people in 2.4 million nationally representative Indian households, to produce underlying medical causes of deaths for about 1 million deaths. This made the MDS one of the largest studies of premature mortality in the world.

The MDS used India’s existing Sample Registration System (SRS), a government program operated by the Registrar General of India since 1971, as a sampling framework for data harvest by trained surveyors. The collaborators of the MDS successfully arranged to expand the overall size of the SRS at the inception of the study in 1998.

Surveyors visited households in the sample units of the SRS every 6 months to inquire about deaths in the family. When a death was noted, an in-person interview of an extant, close family member was administered using the Verbal Autopsy method to determine the deceased’s health status before death and record a narrative of the events leading to death. This written information was then used by trained physicians to assign a probable cause of death using the International Classification of Diseases (ICD-10). The information for each death was provided to two physicians to ensure greater accuracy, with a senior physician adjudicating the assignment of a cause of death in the event of an initial disagreement.

Logistical management and low costs made the MDS a success. The study was able to maintain a cost of less than US$1 per household surveyed by using the existing SRS framework and collaborating with India’s census department and the overall operational cost of the study was about US$2 million per year.

The study had two main phases: the first, from 1998-2003, gathered information on 300 000 deaths within the sample, and the second phase, from 2004-2014, gathered information on the remaining 7,00,000 deaths for the target of about 1 million.

A large amount of data and a wide range of causes of death from the MDS necessitated forming working groups of internal and external scientists to review and interpret results.

The MDS working groups, which reflect the broad categories of global mortality, are as follows:

- Maternal and Child Health: Rajesh Kumar (Chairmen), Shally Awasthi, Robert E. Black, Prabhat Jha, Bhaskar Mishra, Ann Montgomery, Shaun Morris, Vinod K. Paul, Usha Ram, Siddarth Ramji, Sandip Roy, Anita Shet, Mani Subramaniyam
- Alcohol: Prabhat Jha (Chairmen), Neeraj Bhala, Prakash Bhatia, Rajesh Dikshit, Vendhan Gajalakshmi, Prakash C. Gupta, Rajesh Kumar, Richard Peto, Chinthanie Ramasundarahettige, Dhirendra Sinha
- Cancer: Rajesh Dikshit (Chairmen), Lukasz Aleksandrowicz, Hellen Gelband, Prakash C. Gupta, Prabhat Jha, Richard Peto, Chinthanie Ramasundarahettige, Dhirendra Sinha
- Cardiovascular Disease: Rajeev Gupta and D. Prabkaharan (co-chairs), Onil Bhattacharya, Niteesh Choudhury, Dean T. Jamison, Prabhat Jha, Rajesh Kumar, Prem Mony, Rachel Nugent, Denis Xavier
- Injuries: JS Thakur (Chairmen), Marvin Hsiao, Jagnoor Jagnoor, Prabhat Jha, Ajai Malhotra, Vikram Patel
- Malaria: Vinod P. Sharma (Chairmen), Alan Cohen, Neeraj Dhingra, Prabhat Jha, Raju M. Jotkar, Ramanan Laxminaryan, SK Mishra, Richard Peto
- Suicide: Vikram Patel (Chairmen), Vendhan Gajalakshmi, G Gururaj, Prabhat Jha, Chinthanie Ramasundarahettige, K Srinivasan, Lakshmi Vijayakumar

== Key Results of the MDS ==
The World Health Organization’s estimates of disease rates in India are largely based on medically certified causes of death from hospital records, while results from the Million Death Study offered a statistical representation of rural, undocumented deaths. The following are results of the Million Death Study from a variety of scientific publications with several comparisons of disease deaths estimated from hospital record data.

Annual Indian deaths based on the Million Death Study results:

- 2.3M deaths of children under age 5 (2005 figure, since reduced)
- 1M tobacco related deaths
- 556K cancer deaths (2010 figure)
- 100K alcohol related deaths
- 200K malaria deaths (WHO estimate was 15K)
- 100K HIV/AIDS deaths (UNAIDS estimate was 400K)
- 50K snakebite deaths (WHO worldwide estimate was 50K)
- 30K cervical cancer deaths
- 183K road traffic deaths

The various results of the MDS, combined with geospatial analysis, show that each disease has largely varying prevalence rates throughout India, indicated that regional factors affect the prevalence and that these sources of premature mortality are largely avoidable. One example is the wide variation between the estimated Indian national annual average rate of 30 000 cervical cancer deaths compared with only 6000 annual cervical cancer deaths at the reported rates of Jammu and Kashmir state and Assam state.

== Criticism of the MDS ==
Several notable criticisms of the MDS have been discussed in the published scientific literature.

The study’s use of the expanded Indian Sample Registration System for data harvest allows for a large sampling framework, but despite the 7 597 sampling units and reported 2.4 million households the framework still only covers a fraction of India’s more than 1 billion people and more than 9.5 million annual deaths.

The main focus of the MDS is adult mortality and the sampling framework captures a limited number of maternal deaths. This indicates the study may not have sufficient statistical power to thoroughly analyze maternal mortality and its connection with newborn mortality. A wider selection of maternal and newborn health indicators on the surveyor questionnaires during data harvest would have allowed the more detailed study of these sources of premature mortality.

The verbal autopsy method operates with the assumption that most causes of death can be recognized by trained physicians based on descriptions of signs and symptoms provided by an extant close relation of the deceased. Identification is simple for causes of death with distinct symptoms such as tetanus but can be difficult to distinguish in cases that have symptoms common to many diseases, such as of the fever during malaria infection. A verbal autopsy has also been described as ineffective in identifying causes of death in persons over 70 years of age.

An ongoing debate in the field of mortality estimates is the efficiency and validity of boot-strap measurement models such as the MDS compared with modern advances in the computer modeling of disease patterns.

== Legacy of the MDS ==
Published findings from analyses of MDS data have guided several of the Indian Government’s public health policy decisions in the 2000s and early 2010s. The MDS model of data harvesting using low-cost field surveying and the verbal autopsy method has also prompted interest in replicating the study in several other low and middle-income countries.

== Select Publications Related to the MDS ==
- Prabhat Jha et al. (2010) HIV mortality and infection in India: estimates from nationally representative mortality survey of 1.1 million homes
- Mohapatra B et al. (2011) Snakebite Mortality in India: A Nationally Representative Mortality Survey. PLoS NTD. 2011 Apr 12; 5(4): e1018 [Epub].
- Morris SK el al. (2011) Diarrhea, Pneumonia, and Infectious Disease Mortality in Children Aged 5 to 14 Years in India.PLoS One. 2011 May; 6(5): e20119.
- Hsiao M et al. (2013) Road traffic injury mortality and its mechanisms in India: nationally representative mortality survey of 1.1 million homes.BMJ Open. 2013; 3:e002621
- The Million Death Study Collaborators (2010). Causes of neonatal and child mortality in India: a nationally representative mortality survey. The Lancet, Volume 376, Issue 9755, Pages 1853 - 1860, 27 November 2010 doi:10.1016/S0140-6736(10)61461-4
