= T. V. Devarajan =

Indian medical doctor

- Born: Thrissur, Kerala, India
- Occupation: Medical Doctor
- Spouse: Lakshmi Devarajan
- Children: Sangeetha Devarajan
- Parent(s): T. K. Viswanathan; Ranganayaki
- Awards: Padma Shri; B. C. Roy Award

T. V. Devarajan, is an Indian medical doctor and general physician. The Government of India honoured him, in 2013, by awarding him the Padma Shri, the fourth highest civilian award, for his contributions to the field of medicine.

== Biography ==
Devarajan was born in Thrissur, in the south Indian state of Kerala. He graduated in medicine and went on to take the degrees of MD and DSc in general medicine. He was also awarded the Fellowship of the Royal College of Physicians of Glasgow in 2007.

He started his career by joining the faculty of the Madras Medical College, where he taught without drawing a salary for 29 years. Later, he moved to the Aarupadai Veedu Medical College, Kirumambakkam, as a professor, where he still teaches general medicine. He has also been a senior consultant physician at the Apollo Hospitals, Chennai, since 1986.

He is the author of four books, Aids to Clinical Medicine, Medicine in a Nutshell Clinical Medicine Made Easy and Medical Advice for Healthy Life.

Devarajan is also credited with 28 articles such as A Challenging Case of Intra-abdominal Sepsis with Multiorgan Failure: An Emerging Role of Intravenous Immunoglobulin in Sepsis, published in various journals. He also assists students in their research activities. He was awarded gold medal for surgery, gynaecology and prize in medicine and ophthalmology as a medical student. He delivered student memorial oration in Madras Medical College and he served as an inspector for national board of examination.

Devarajan, an examiner for a few universities, lives in Chetpet, Chennai, in Tamil Nadu. His daughter, Sangeetha Devarajan, has followed her father's footsteps and is a UK-based gynaecologist and a member of the Royal College of Gynaecologists.

Devarajan is also a member of professional bodies such as the Cardiological Society of India and the Chennai chapter of the Association of Physicians of India. He is also the editor in chief in preparation of a textbook of medicine. He is a jury member for selection of Oscar awards in medicine by BMJ. He is an examiner for MBBS, MD and PhD for many universities.

== Awards and recognitions ==
Devarajan was honoured with Dr. B. C. Roy Award, recognizing him as an eminent teacher, in 2003. In 2013, the Government of India awarded him the fourth highest civilian award, the Padma Shri.

== See also ==
- Apollo Hospitals
