= Sanjeev Bagai =

Indian paediatrician and medical administrator (born 1965)

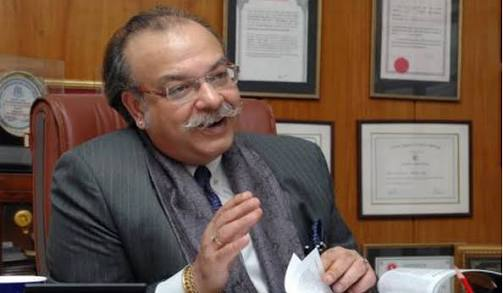
- Dr. Sanjeev Bagai – Pediatrician and medical administrator.
- Born: 31 March 1965 (age 61); New Delhi, India
- Education: King Edward Memorial Hospital and Seth Gordhandas Sunderdas Medical College
- Occupations: Pediatrician; Medical administrator
- Known for: Pediatric Nephrology and Neonatology
- Awards: Padma Shri; Dr. B. C. Roy Award
- Website: Official website

Sanjeev Bagai (Malayalam: born 31 March 1965) is an Indian pediatrician and nephrologist recognized for his expertise in pediatric nephrology and neonatology. He serves as the chairman of the Nephron Clinic in New Delhi, India. Bagai has been a visiting professor of pediatrics at Saint Justin Hospital in Canada and the University of Toledo, Ohio. Bagai has also taught at the University of New South Wales, Sydney.

== Early life ==
Bagai was a gold medalist at Mumbai University and the recipient of both the Sir Dorab Tata Merit Scholarship and the Mumbai University Merit Scholarship.

== Career ==
In 2008, Bagai was awarded the Padma Shri for his contributions to medical science. He also received the prestigious Dr. B. C. Roy Award the same year.

He completed his graduation, MBBS from the GS Medical College & KEM Hospital Mumbai; DCH, MD (Paed) from Wadia Children’s Hospital; MNAMS (Pediatric); DNBE (Pediatric); MIPA (USA); Fellowship in Prince Of Wales Children's Hospital, Australia (FSCH); FIMSA; PhD (honoris causa) (USA) Doctorate in Pediatric Nephrology, National American University, Delaware, USA.

He has been the vice chairman, CEO, director, and dean of numerous corporate hospital chains that he created and commissioned. He was formerly the Vice Chairman of the Manipal Hospital Dwarka, New Delhi; CEO of Batra Hospital and Medical Research Centre, New Delhi; and Radiant Life Care, New Delhi. He has also been the medical advisor and director at Rockland Hospital, New Delhi.

== Written work ==
Bagai has written several health-related articles for The Hindu, a prominent Indian newspaper. He also served as editor-in-chief of the International Journal of Pediatric Nephrology. In addition, Bagai authored a thesis on pediatric enuresis. He has published in national and international peer-reviewed, indexed medical journals. He has contributed to the development of numerous research protocols and serves on several expert research committees for medical associations.

== See also ==
- Enuresis
