= John Ebnezar =

Indian orthopedic surgeon

- Born: Karnataka, India
- Occupation: Orthopedic surgeon
- Known for: Holistic orthopedics
- Awards: Padma Shri; Rajyotsava Prashasti; Dr. B. C. Roy Award

John Ebnezar is an Indian orthopaedic doctor, known for promoting holistic orthopaedics, a practice combining modern medical techniques with yoga for the management of osteoarthritis.

He was awarded Rajyotsava Prashasti, the second highest civilian award of the Government of Karnataka in 2010. He received Dr. B. C. Roy Award, the highest award in the field of Medicine in India in 2015. The Government of India awarded him the fourth highest civilian award of the Padma Shri in 2016.

== Selected books ==
- Ebnezar, John (1998). Text Book of Orthopaedics. Jaypee Brothers. ISBN 978-81-7179-559-8.
- Ebnezar, John (2010). Clinical Examination Methods in Orthopedics. Boydell & Brewer Ltd. ISBN 978-81-8448-805-0.
- Ebnezar, John (30 December 2013). Practical Orthopedics. I. K. International Pvt Ltd. ISBN 978-93-80026-27-5.
- Ebnezar, John (2012). Low Back Pain. JP Medical Ltd. ISBN 978-93-5025-644-2.
- John, Ebnezar (4 December 2012). Text and Atlas on Complications of Fractures. Jaypee Brothers Publishers. ISBN 978-93-5025-685-5.
- Ebnezar, John (14 September 2010). Essentials Orthopedics Physio. Jaypee Brothers Medical Publishers. ISBN 978-93-5025-161-4.
- Ebnezar, John; Nigam, S. (30 June 2016). Common Orthopedic Problems. CBS Publishers & Distributors. ISBN 978-81-239-1849-5.
- Ebnezar, John (1 November 2008). Emergency in Orthopaedics. Jp Medical Pub. ISBN 978-81-8448-251-5.
- Ebnezar, John; Rakesh, John (30 June 2018). Short Textbook of Orthopedics for Undergraduate Students. CBS Publishers & Distributors. ISBN 978-93-86478-69-6.
- Ebnezar, John (30 April 2011). Outline of Orthopedics and Fractures. CBS Publishers & Distributors. ISBN 978-81-239-1970-6.
- Ebnezar, John (2007). Step by Step Injection Techniques in Orthopaedics. Jaypee Brothers. ISBN 978-0-7817-9126-7.
