= M. Khalilullah =

Indian doctor

- Born: Muhammad Khalilullah; India
- Education: Government Medical College, Nagpur
- Alma mater: Nagpur University
- Occupation: Cardiologist
- Years active: 1960–Present
- Title: Former Honorary Physician to the President of India
- Awards: Padma Bhushan (1990), Padma Shri (1984), Dr. B.C. Roy (1984)

M. Khalilullah is an Indian cardiologist and a former honorary physician to the President of India. He is a recipient of Padma Bhushan in 1990 (the third highest civilian award in India) and Padma Shri in 1984 (the fourth highest civilian award in India He also received the highest award a doctor can achieve in India - Dr. B.C. Roy award in 1984.

== life ==
He developed the first indigenous pacemaker (Khalilullah-Mendez) in India while undertaking his D.M. (Cardiology) at AIIMS, Delhi in 1969.

He also edited the first Indian text book on cardiology.

He is an alumnus of Nagpur University (Govt. Medical College, Nagpur) where he completed his M.B.B.S (1960) and M.D. (Medicine) (1965).
