= Prabhu Dayal Nigam =

Indian cardiologist and medical academic

- Born: India
- Education: Master's degrees in medicine
- Occupations: Cardiologist, medical academic
- Known for: Interventional cardiologist
- Awards: Padma Shri; Dr. B. C. Roy Award

Prabhu Dayal Nigam is an Indian interventional cardiologist, medical academic and the founder of the department of cardiology at Dr. Ram Manohar Lohia Hospital, New Delhi. Holder of multiple master's degrees in medicine, he served as senior consultant of cardiology at the Indraprastha Apollo Hospitals, Delhi.

Nigam was an honorary physician to the President of India and an honorary consultant cardiologist to the Armed Forces of India. He is a fellow of the American College of Cardiology, served as a member of the selection Committees of Union Public Service Commission, Uttar Pradesh Service Commission and Benaras Hindu University and sat on the committees of the Indian Council of Medical Research, University Grants Commission and the academic council of the University of Delhi.

The World Health Organization included him on their panel of experts on hypertension. He received the Dr. B. C. Roy Award, the highest Indian award in the medical category, in 1983. The Government of India awarded him the fourth highest civilian honour of Padma Shri in 1987.

== Honours and awards ==
- B C Roy Award in 1983
- Padma Shri Award in 1987
- Honorary Physician to President of India
- Honorary Consultant to Armed Forces Medical College.
