= AJ Kanwar =

Indian dermatologist

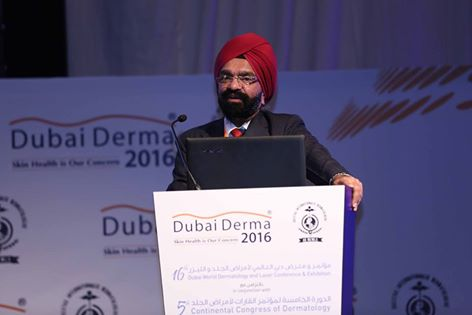

AJ Kanwar (born 29 June 1948) is an Indian Dermatologist. He has been Senior Professor and Head, Department of Dermatology, Venereology & Leprology, PGI Chandigarh and currently practices in his hometown, New Delhi, India. AJ Kanwar is the son of Late Shri Inder Singh and Smt Shanti Devi and was born on 29 June 1948. He attended school in New Delhi and graduated from the prestigious AIIMS, New Delhi in MBBS in 1969. He continued in AIIMS, New Delhi to obtain his post graduate degree (M.D.) in Dermatology and Venereology in 1975. After his senior residency in AIIMS, Kanwar went on a foreign assignment in Benghazi, Libya. He also served a year in St John's Institute of Dermatology, London during a Commonwealth Medical Fellowship. He received a special training in Pediatric Dermatology during this year. To his credit are also time in National Institute of Health, Washington USA in 2006 for a Fellowship in AIDS, and a month in Kurume, Japan in 2010 for special training in Pemphigus. Kanwar's foreign assignment in Libya, ended in 1987 when he returned to join PGI Chandigarh.

In 2020, based on an independent study done by scientists at Stanford University, he was ranked amongst the top 2% Indian Scientists. He was awarded Dr B.C. Roy National award, one of the highest recognition given in the field of medicine, by the President of India, on 1 July at the Rastrapati Bhawan. The Indian Medical Council gave him the Lala Ram Chand Kandhari Award to him, in 2010 for his outstanding work in Vitiligo. He was also the first in India to report efficacy of Rituximab for treatment of Pemphigus He was selected as a fellow of National Academy of Medical Sciences (FAMS) in 2008 and as a Fellow of Royal College of Physicians (FRCP) London in 2011.

He has more than 592 publications to his credit, in national and international Textbooks and Journals. In 2011, he was credited as first in India to report efficacy and safety of Rituximab for treatment of Pemphigus. He is co-author of Textbook of Surgical Management of Vitiligo published by Blackwell

== Awards and recognition ==
- Ranked top 2% Indian Scientist in the world based on a 2020 Independent study done by Stanford University scientists.
- Awarded Dr. B. C. Roy Award (2010) for Eminent Medical Teacher in the field of Dermatology
- Awarded with Dr RV Rajam Oration (2013–2014) Annual Meeting of National Academy of Medical Science
- Received ICMR Lala Ram Chand Kandhari Award (2010) for his work on therapy and other aspects of vitiligo
