= Ashok Rajgopal =

Indian orthopedic surgeon

- Born: India
- Occupation: Orthopedic surgeon
- Awards: Padmashri * Knee Ratna Award; Bharat Shiromani Award; Distinguished Service Award
- Website: www.rajgopalkneesurg.com/Official%20web%20site

Ashok Rajgopal is an Indian orthopaedic surgeon, credited with close to 18 ,000 Arthroscopic and over 35,000 Total Knee Arthroplasty surgeries and reported to be one of the most experienced in his field in India. He was honoured by the Government of India in 2014, by bestowing on him the Padmashri, the fourth highest civilian award, for his services to the fields of orthopaedic surgery. He has also been awarded the Dr. BC Roy award by the Medical Council of India to "Recognize the Best Talents in Encouraging the Development of Specialties in Different Branches in Medicine" for 2014.

== Biography ==
Ashok Rajgopal was born on 30 September 1953, in Bengaluru, in the Indian state of Karnataka. He graduated in medicine (MBBS) from the Armed Forces Medical College, Pune University in 1974 and went for higher studies to the All India Institute of Medical Sciences, New Delhi from where he obtained Master of Surgery (MS), in 1978. This was followed by a stint of studies at the University of Liverpool and, in 1983, secured the degree of MCh. He is also a Fellow of International Medical Sciences Academy - FIMSA (1996) and a Fellow of the Royal College of Surgeons of Edinburgh (2010).

Rajgopal did his internship at the Central Hospital of Northern Railways at New Delhi in 1975. He did his junior residency at the All India Institute of Medical Sciences, New Delhi, after which he did his post-graduation in orthopedics there. From March 1979 to August 1980, he did his senior residency at Safdarjung Hospital, New Delhi. Thereafter, he continued his higher studies, followed by another senior residency at the Ormskirk General Hospital, Lancashire, United Kingdom, till 1985.

After returning to India, in 1985, he started independent orthopaedic practice at Sehgal Neurological Research Institute, New Delhi, and at Moolchand Hospital, New Delhi, as a Senior consultant orthopedic surgeon. In 1996 he joined Sitaram Bhartia Institute of Science and Research, New Delhi, as senior orthopaedic consultant . In 2004, he joined Fortis Hospital, New Delhi where he worked as the Director of Orthopedic Department till he joined Medanta, in 2009. In October 2009, Dr. Ashok Rajgopal joined Medanta, a multi speciality hospital in Gurgaon, Haryana and was serving as the Chairman of the Bone and Joint Institute, in the hospital. In July 2016, Dr. Ashok Rajgopal joined Fortis Memorial Research Institute, Gurgaon and Fortis Escorts, Okhla as Executive Director and Chairman Fortis Bone and Joint Institute. In March 2019 Dr. Rajgopal took over as Group Chairman, Medanta Institute of Musculoskeletal Disorders and Orthopaedics, Medanta- The Medicity, Gurugram.

== Achievements ==
Rajgopal, who specialises in Joint Replacement Surgery and Orthopaedic surgery of the knee joint, has reportedly performed more than 20,000 arthroscopic, over 35,000 arthroplasty including Minimally Invasive Total Knee Replacement (TKR) Surgeries, making him one of the most prolific orthopedic surgeons in India. He is reported to have good success rate in hip and joint replacement surgeries, and compares favourably with any other surgeon in the world.

Rajgopal pioneered Bilateral Total Knee Replacement surgery in India in April 1987. He introduced Minimally Invasive Knee surgery in March 2002. He is also the designer of the special instruments used during this surgery which are being used as the standard instruments for this procedure by surgeons all over the world. He is actively involved in research and designing of knee implants. A member of the Global Persona Developer Team, supported by Zimmer, he has been instrumental in the designing of the PERSONA Knee system. This is a personalised knee replacement system and has been launched in India on 3 Sep 2013.

Rajgopal was appointed honorary surgeon to the President of India, in 1997, during the term of KR Narayanan. As an expert in sports medicine, he has also treated a number of sports persons. He is famous for treating Pullela Gopichand and helping him get back on the court when the badminton player suffered a career threatening knee injury while playing doubles at the 1994 National Games at Pune. It is reported that on realizing Gopichand's inability to pay the fees, Rajgopal, a sports enthusiast, waived the fees and asked for an All England title in return. Gopichand went on to win the All England Badminton Championships in 2001 and, years later, said that Rajgopal was one of the first persons he thought of after winning the championship point against Chen Hong.

Rajgopal has been a speaker at several international and national conferences and has been an invited speaker at the Harvard Knee Course in 2013. He has also chaired several orthopaedics conferences both in India and abroad. He has been involved in the teaching and training of young Orthopaedic surgeons from all over the world. He is also on the editorial board of the KSSTA (Knee Surgery Sports Traumatology and Arthroscopy) and is a reviewer for the JBJS (British Volume), both well known and widely read Journals of Orthopaedic Surgery.

== Awards and recognitions ==
Rajgopal is a recipient of the Padmashri award from the Government of India, which was bestowed upon him, in 2014, for his services to the field of medicine. He has also received other awards such as:

- Knee Ratna Award, Indian Medical Association, New Delhi
- Bharat Shiromani Award for professional excellence in the field of Orthopaedics - 2008-2009
- Distinguished Service Award - Delhi Doctor Association - 2004

Rajgopal has recently been awarded the Dr. B.C. Roy award for " Best Talent in encouraging the development of specialities in different branches in Medicine" for the year 2014.

== Positions ==
Rajgopal has held, and currently holds several key positions and memberships, some of the notable ones being:

- Founder Member, Vice President and former President - Indian Hip and Knee Society
- Life Member - Indian Arthroplasty Association
- Life Member - Indian Orthopaedic Association
- Life Member and former President - Indian Arthroscopy Association
- Life Member - Indian Association of Sports Medicine
- Founder President and former Secretary - Asia Pacific Arthroplasty Society
- Member - International Society of Arthroscopy, Knee Surgery and Orthopaedic Sports Medicine (ISAKOS)
- Member - Indian Medical Sciences Academy

He holds permanent registration with the General Medical Council (UK).

== See also ==
- Knee replacement
