= Arvind Kumar (surgeon) =

Indian surgeon

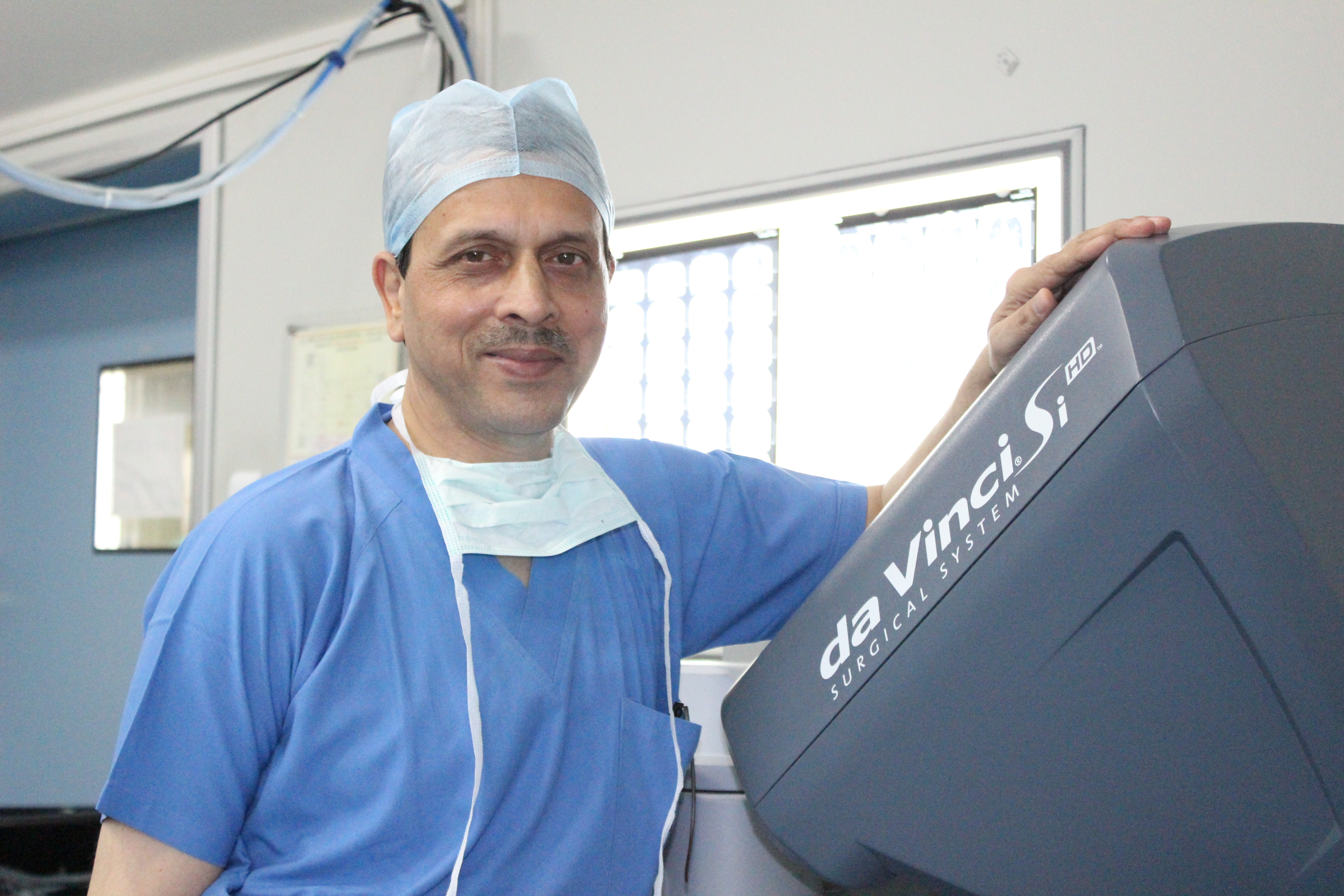
- Education: AIIMS New Delhi (MBBS, MS)
- Occupation: Thoracic, Thoracoscopic and Robotic surgeon
- Awards: Dr. B. C. Roy Award : Eminent Medical Person of the Year 2014
- Website: www.drarvindkumar.com

Arvind Kumar is an Indian thoracic surgeon. He is the chairman of the Institute of Thoracic Surgery, Thoracic Oncology Surgery, and Lung Transplantation at Medanta Hospital, in Gurugram, Haryana.

In 2014, Dr. Kumar was awarded the Dr. B. C. Roy Award by the President of India, Pranab Mukherjee.

== Career ==
Dr. Kumar was a professor of surgery and head of the Thoracic and Robotic Surgery Unit at the All India Institute of Medical Sciences, New Delhi (AIIMS) from 1988 to 2012. From 2012 to 2020, he was the Centre for Chest Surgery's chairman and director of the Institute of Robotic Surgery at Sir Ganga Ram Hospital, New Delhi.

Dr. Kumar utilizes minimally invasive thoracic surgical techniques, including video-assisted thoracoscopic surgery (VATS) and robot-assisted thoracic procedures.

He is a co-founder of the Lung Care Foundation, along with three colleagues. This organization aims to improve lung health for patients in India through research and public education.

== Contributions ==
=== Thoracic surgery ===
Dr. Kumar introduced video-assisted thoracoscopic surgery (VATS) in India at AIIMS. He performed the first VATS thymectomy for myasthenia gravis and thymoma at AIIMS, New Delhi in 2000.

== Training and fellowships ==
- In 1999, he received a WHO Fellowship for training in advanced tracheobronchial surgery at Barnes Jewish Hospital, Washington University in St. Louis, Missouri, under Dr. Joel Cooper and Dr. Patterson, and at St. Peter's Hospital, New Jersey, under Dr. Ralph J. Lewis.
- In 2007, he received robotic surgery training at the International School of Robotic Surgery in Grosseto, Italy.
- In 2019, he was awarded the ICRETT Fellowship by the Union for International Cancer Control (UICC), Geneva, for training in minimal access and advanced chest surgical procedures under Robert J. Ginsberg at Memorial Sloan Kettering Cancer Center, New York.

== National awards ==
- 1984 - Awarded the Khandelwal Junior Oncology Award for Scientific Excellence for a paper on oesophageal cancer
- 1992 - Awarded the Dr. A.K. Sen Sarma Endowment Lecture by the Association of Surgeons of India
- 1999 - Awarded the Raj Nanda Fellowship by the Raj Nanda Pulmonary Disease Research Trust in association with the British Thoracic Society
- 2013 - Awarded the Dr. PK Sen Memorial Oration by the Association of Surgeons of India
- 2014 - Received the Dr. B.C. Roy Award from the Government of India in the category "Eminent Medical Person of the Year 2014"
- 2019 - Received the ASI Betadine Lifetime Achievement Award and the ASI Social Services Award 2019 from the Association of Surgeons of India
