= Upendra Kaul =

Dr U Koul

- Born: India
- Occupation: Cardiologist
- Known for: Interventional cardiology
- Awards: Padma Shri; Dr. B. C. Roy Award; Medtronic Award; CSI Searle Award; ICMR Shakuntala Amirchand Prize; Press India Award

Upendra Kaul is an Indian cardiologist and a pioneer of interventional cardiology in India. He currently serves as the chairman and dean of academics and research at Batra Hospital and Medical Research Center in New Delhi. He is renowned for his expertise in advanced cardiac procedures, including Percutaneous Cardiopulmonary Bypass, Rotational and Directional Atherectomy, Coronary Stenting, and Percutaneous Laser Myocardial Revascularization.

== Early life and education ==
Kaul graduated with an MBBS degree from Maulana Azad Medical College in New Delhi. He continued his studies at the same institution, earning an MD in 1975 and a DM in cardiology in 1978. Between 1983 and 1984, he pursued advanced training in interventional cardiology in Australia, further honing his skills in the field.

== Career ==
Kaul has held numerous prestigious positions throughout his career. He served as a Professor of Cardiology at the All India Institute of Medical Sciences (AIIMS) and has been a faculty member at several renowned institutions, including the Post Graduate Institute of Medical Education and Research, G.B. Pant Hospital, Batra Hospital, and Fortis Health Care in the National Capital Region (NCR). He also held the position of Executive Director and Dean at Fortis Health Care, New Delhi.

A former president of the Cardiological Society of India and the SAARC Cardiac Society, Kaul has made significant contributions to the advancement of cardiology in India and the South Asian region. In November 2024, he was appointed Chairman of the Institutional Ethics Committee of the Sher-i-Kashmir Institute of Medical Sciences. He was given the Life Time Achievement Award by the Indian Society of Clinical Research for his outstanding contributions in February 2026.

Kaul has authored over 450 medical papers and is recognized as a prolific researcher in his field. In 2019, he was briefly summoned by the National Investigation Agency (NIA) after a misunderstanding in which his use of medical jargon was mistaken for references to a hawala transaction.

=== Gauri Kaul Foundation ===
In April 2021, Kaul founded the Gauri Kaul Foundation, a non-governmental organization registered with the Ministry of Corporate Affairs (MCA) under DIN 09139657. The foundation focuses on cardiovascular health awareness and has established three centers in Jammu and Kashmir: Machil (near the Line of Control in District Kupwara), Jagti Migrant Township (near Nagrota, Jammu), and Hawal, Pulwama (his place of birth). Supported by corporate social responsibility (CSR) contributions from Indian Oil Corporation (IOC), Oil and Natural Gas Corporation (ONGC), and AstraZeneca, the foundation’s current mission is "No Heart Attack," aiming to educate the public on preventive measures through awareness programs. In April 2025, the foundation added a service "Heart Clinic on Wheels", a facility with ECG, portable echocardiography machine, point of care blood tests to diagnose acute heart failure, Heart damage, HbA1c etc. This facility is meant for remote areas of South Kashmir and also to school children for birth defects of heart and silent rheumatic heart disease (PTI news on 10 April 2025.

== Publications ==
In September 2022, Kaul published his memoirs titled When the Heart Speaks, released by Konark Publishing House. The book provides insights into his life, career, and contributions to cardiology.

== Awards and honours ==
Kaul has received numerous accolades for his contributions to medicine and cardiology, including:

- Dr. Thapar Gold Medal (1970)
- Medtronic Award for Best Scientific Paper (1983)
- Searle Award, Cardiological Society of India (1986)
- Shakuntala Amirchand Prize, Indian Council of Medical Research (1987)
- Press India Award (1992)
- Dr. B. C. Roy Award, the highest Indian medical honour (1999)
- Padma Shri, the fourth highest civilian honour from the Government of India (2006)

He is also a Fellow of the American College of Cardiology and the National Academy of Medical Sciences (NAMS).

== See also ==
- Atherectomy
- Cardiopulmonary bypass
- Coronary stenting
- Revascularization
