= Nikhil Tandon =

Indian endocrinologist

- Born: 28 November 1963 (age 62); Delhi, India
- Occupation: Endocrinologist
- Known for: Thyroid epidemiology, diabetes
- Awards: Padma Shri; Dr. B. C. Roy Award

Nikhil Tandon is an Indian endocrinologist, medical academic and the head of the department of endocrinology, metabolism and diabetes at the All India Institute of Medical Sciences. He is a recipient of Dr. B. C. Roy Award, the highest Indian medical award in 2005 and was honoured by the Government of India in 2015 with Padma Shri, the fourth highest Indian civilian award.

== Biography ==
Nikhil Tandon was born on 28 November 1963 in Delhi. He secured his master's degree (MD) from the All India Institute of Medical Sciences, New Delhi, obtained his doctoral degree (PhD) from the University of Cambridge and returned to India in 1993 to join AIIMS as a member of its faculty. He has stayed with AIIMS ever since and is a professor and the head of the department of endocrinology, metabolism and diabetes at the institution. He has been the national co-ordinator for Action in Diabetes and Vascular Diseases (ADVANCE), a study conducted by The George Institute for Global Health, Australia for combating the risks of diabetes and prevent it becoming a global epidemic and has been a member of the steering committee of Center for Cardio-metabolic Risk Reduction in South Asia (CARRS) Trial funded by the National Heart Lung and Blood Institute. He also serves as a member of the faculty of Emory University.

Tandon is a former vice-president of the National Academy of Sciences, India and a president and the incumbent general secretary of the Indian Society for Bone and Mineral Research. He has served as an executive committee member of the Endocrine Society of India and is its president. He is an elected fellow of the National Academy of Sciences, India and a fellow of the National Academy of Medical Sciences and the Royal College of Physicians of London. He has been associated with several national and international bodies such as Indian Council of Medical Research, Defence Research and Development Organization, Department of Biotechnology, National Institutes of Health, Institute for International Health and British Heart Foundation for research on thyroid epidemiology, diabetes and metabolic bone diseases and has participated in many clinical trials. His research findings have been published in several national and international journals, PubMed listing 454 of them in their online repository. He has also featured in the news for the pituitary tumor surgery of the then tallest woman in the world, Siddiqa Parveen.

The Medical Council of India awarded him Dr. B. C. Roy Award in the medical teaching category in 2005. The Government of India followed it up with the civilian award of Padma Shri in 2015. He lives at the Asian Games Village in New Delhi.
