= Ramaswami Venkataswami =

Indian plastic surgeon

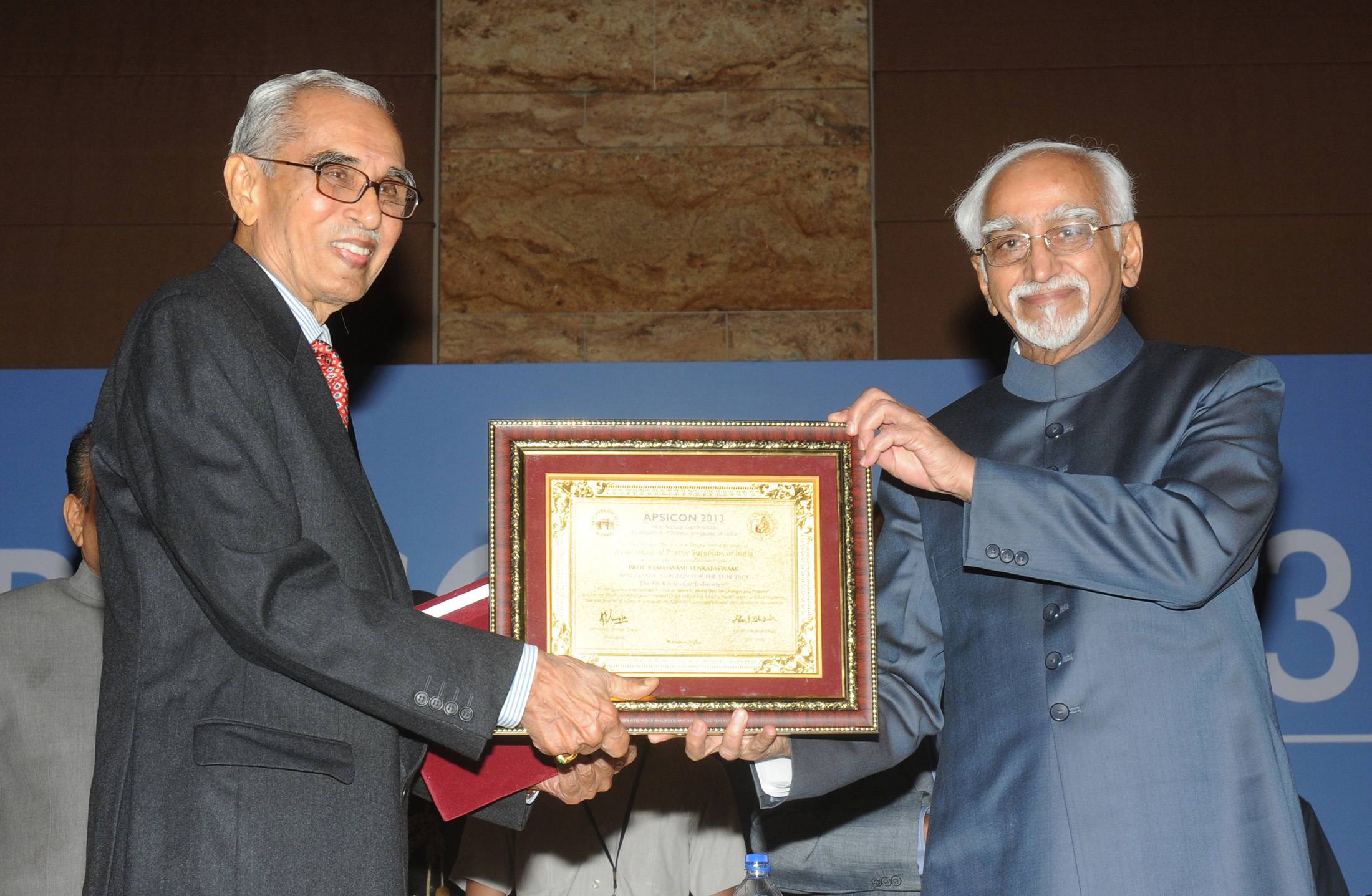
Mohd. Hamid Ansari presenting the award of “APSI-Plastic Surgeon for the Year 2013” to Prof. Ramaswami Venkataswami.

Professor Ramaswami Venkataswami is a plastic surgeon, founder of the Institute for the Research and Rehabilitation of Hand and the Department of Plastic Surgery (IRRH and DPS) of Stanley Medical College and Hospitals (SMC), Chennai, India. He founded the department in 1971 and headed it until 1991 when he retired from Government service. His major accomplishments include the creation of a dedicated hand injury service with staff, beds and operating theatre dedicated to the service. The service provided 24/7 management of acute hand injuries and housed all specialities related to the long-term management of such injuries - including physiotherapy, occupational health, and workplace rehabilitation. He also initiated the use of microsurgical methods in the repair and reconstruction at Stanley in 1978-79 (the first microsurgical procedure in the department was carried out in 1980). He is an alumnus of SMC and an elected fellow of the National Academy of Medical Sciences.

Prof. Venkataswami joined SMC in 1951 for his MBBS and followed it with a postgraduation in general surgery. After this, he went to Nagpur Medical College to specialise in plastic surgery. He later founded the Department of Plastic Surgery at SMC. Prof. R. Venkataswamy is awarded Padma Shri, the fourth highest civilian award in the Republic of India, for his outstanding contribution in the year 2019.

As of July 2012, Prof. Venkataswami practices at Apollo First Med Hospital in Chennai.
