= Thomas Thomas (surgeon) =

Indian surgeon and writer

- Born: August 29, 1917
- Died: October 31, 1998 (aged 81)
- Education: Stanley Medical College
- Known for: Early cardiothoracic surgery in India
- Medical career
- Profession: Cardiothoracic surgeon

Thomas Thomas (29 August 1917 – 31 October 1998) was the first cardio-thoracic surgeon of Indian citizenship, as well as a prolific author and poet.

== Life ==
Thomas studied at Madras Christian College, Tamil Nadu, before undertaking his medical training at Stanley Medical College, Tamil Nadu.

He received his MBBS from the University of Madras in 1945. After qualifying, Thomas worked in thoracic surgery at Christian Medical College, Vellore, under Reeve H. Betts, who established CMC's Department of Cardiothoracic Surgery in 1948.

Thomas co-authored research with Betts from 1951, including work on thoracic surgery, patent ductus arteriosus and intrathoracic hydatid disease..

In 1954, while working at Christian Medical College and Hospital, Vellore, he received a Rockefeller Foundation fellowship for further study in thoracic surgery in the United States.. He did further medical research in London and Edinburgh.

Thomas subsequently worked at Kasturba Medical College in Manipal, Karnataka. Towards the end of 1964, he accepted an appointment as Director of Thoracic Surgery at Lisie Hospital, Ernakulam and established the Department of Thoracic Surgery there. The hospital credits him with pioneering cardiac surgery in Kerala, including open-heart surgery. A few months later, he was also appointed Professor of Surgery at Alleppey Medical College.

He died at the age of 81 in Sydney.

== Literary Career ==
Thomas began writing short stories in 1938 to help meet the costs of his medical education. Writing under the pen name Nirmal Jacob, he published stories in Indian English-language periodicals, some of which were translated into Indian languages.

His first novel, Monsoon: A Story of Rural Kerala, was written in 1949 and published in book form in 1968. It had previously been serialised in The Caravan, a New Delhi magazine, approximately fifteen years before its book publication. The 1968 edition was revised and published with the permission of the magazine's editor, Vishva Nath.

Thomas also wrote A Grain of Wheat (1986), a biographical novel based on the life of Alphonsa of Bharananganam.

Following his retirement to Australia, Thomas became involved in the literary community of Liverpool, New South Wales. His writing appeared in Visions Through the Mist (1993), published by the Liverpool Regional Fellowship of Australian Writers, and Poetry Alive & Well (1994), an anthology edited by Margaret Rossall. The latter included four of his poems.

== Publications (selected) ==
Betts, R. H., Thomas, T., Pai, M. P., and Paw, K. (1951). Recent advances in thoracic surgery; II. Indian Journal of Surgery, 13(4), 367–407.

Betts, R. H., and Thomas, T. (1951). The surgery of patent ductus arteriosus. Journal of the Indian Medical Association, 20(9), 309–311.

Betts, R. H., and Thomas, T. (1953). Patent ductus arteriosus with endarteritis; report of a case complicated by pulmonary infarction, treated by ligation of the ductus and segmental pulmonary resection. Diseases of the Chest, 23(2), 166–170.

Thomas, T., Betts, R. H., and Gopinath, N. (1953). The role of resection in pulmonary tuberculosis. Journal of the Indian Medical Association, 23(1), 10–13.

Thomas, T., Betts, R. H., and Ghosh, A. K. (1954). Management of empyema thoracis. Journal of the Indian Medical Association, 23(11), 483–487.

Betts, R. H., and Thomas, T. (1954). The treatment of intrathoracic hydatid disease. Diseases of the Chest, 26(5), 584–603.

"Results of Resection for Pulmonary Tuberculosis", Indian Journal of Tuberculosis Vol. III, New Delhi, March, 1956. No. 3.

Betts, R. H., Saini, V. K., and Thomas, T. (1959). Surgery of the rheumatic heart. Journal of the Indian Medical Association, 32(2), 37–45.

Betts, R. H., Gopinath, N., and Thomas, T. (1959). Achalasia cardia. Journal of the Indian Medical Association, 32(7), 281–284.

Thomas, T., Betts, R. H., Vytilingam, K. I., Gopinath, N., and Saini, V. K. (1962). Patent ductus arteriosus: A review of 55 operated cases. Journal of the Indian Medical Association, 39, 177–180.
