= N. K. Venkataramana =

- Born: Andhra Pradesh, India
- Occupation: Neurosurgeon
- Known for: Microneurosurgery
- Awards: Rotary P. R. S. Shetty Endowment Gold Medal; B. C. Roy Award; Rotary Outstanding Public Service Award; Lions Best Public Service Award; Rotary Neurosciences Award; Rajiv Gandhi Shiromani Award; PRCI Chanakya Award; Karnataka Rajyotsava Award; N. T. R. Award; Sir M. Vishweshwaraya Global Leadership Award; Dayananda Sagar Award
- Website: Profile

N. K. Venkataramana is an Indian neurosurgeon and the founder of ANSA Research Foundation, a non-profit non governmental organization promoting research on neuroscience, neurological disorders, cancer biology, stem cells and tumor tissue repository. He is a recipient of Dr. B. C. Roy Award, the highest Indian award in the medical category and the Rajyotsava Prashasti, the second highest civilian award of the Government of Karnataka.

== Biography ==
N. K. Venkataramana graduated in medicine (MBBS) from the Sri Venkateswara Institute of Medical Sciences, Tirupati and secured a master's degree (MCh) in neurosurgery after which he completed fellowship at the National Institute of Mental Health and Neurosciences (NIMHANS), Bengaluru. He also underwent advanced training at Nordtstud Krankenhause, Germany and secured a fellowship. His career started as an assistant professor at NIMHANS in 1986 where he stayed until 1991 to move to Manipal Hospital, Bengaluru as a consultant neurosurgeon. In 2001, he founded the Manipal Institute for Neurological Disorders, the Neurosciences division of the hospital. In 2007, he moved to BGS Global Hospital as a director and established the Global Institute of Neurosciences at Kengeri, a suburb of Bengaluru. He worked as the chief neurosurgeon of the institute and as the vice chairman of BGS Global Hospitals. He founded BRAINS (Bangalore Regenerative Advanced Institute of Neurosciences).

== BRAINS ==
BRAINS has established a 24/7 call centre and emergency services to aid them in future implementations across all hospitals.

BRAINS hospitals cater to neurological diseases among all ages, and established trauma centres for injuries and strokes, effectively. In addition, special clinics for Parkinson’s disease, Multiple Sclerosis, Epilepsy, Brain tumors, and Auto-immune Neurological disorders are also included.

The BRAINS hospital also provides Comprehensive care for all the problems associated with the spine. All their hospitals provide total care starting from developmental defects in children to degenerative diseases of the spine in adults. Apart from holistic treatment, they offer tailor made solutions to the individual needs.

BRAINS operates from hospitals located at SSNMC Hospital RR Nagar, Sparsh Hospital Infantry Road, MVJ Hospital Hosakote, Cytecare Hospital, New Airport Road, and Aveksha Hospital Singapura, Jalahalli. Of which Cyte careecrai and Braifurpecialises as Ocology and Educational centres, respectively.

The magazine "Brain Voice" is one of their initiatives to create awareness about brain, spine, spirituality and related issues. This is a bilingual monthly magazine, both in English and Kannada, that is growing a large following.

"Golden Hour" is a social initiative of BRAINS advocating timely and quality care in Emergencies with an access number 1062. Empowering people with first aid and life saving measures, awareness creation, advocacy, network of quick access clinics to treat within the first hour, protocol development, standardisation of care, training and preparedness initiatives are the main activities of Golden Hour.

== Professional associations ==
Venkataramana is a member of the Neurological Society of India, Indian Society for Cerebro Vascular Surgery, American Association of Neurological Surgeons, International Society of Paediatric Neurosurgery, New York Academy of Sciences, Asian Congress of Neurological Surgeons, Indian Society of Palliative Medicine, Stemcell Research Forum of India, Indian Society of Oncology and Common Wealth Association for Mental Handicap and Developmental Disabilities. He is the president of the Indian Society for Sterotactic and Functional Neurosurgery and the vice president of the Indian Society for Paediatric Neurosurgery.

== Legacy ==
Venkataramana is credited with over 25000 neurosurgeries over the past 30 years. Reports credit him with the first neuroendoscopic surgery, CT Guided stereotactic surgery, Deep Brain Stimulation surgery for Parkinson's disease and sacral nerve stimulation for neurogenic bladder dysfunction in Karnataka. He has performed the Disc Nucleoplasty for lumbar and cervical disc prolapse and the transplantation of autologous bone marrow derived mesenchymal stem cells for Parkinson's disease for the first time in India. He is known to have introduced microdialysis of brain and stem cell therapy for cerebral palsy for the first time in Asia.

Venkataramana has published over 75 papers in peer reviewed national and international journals and has contributed chapters in various text books on neurosurgery. He has also conducted several continuing medical education (CME) programmes and has delivered keynote addresses at many conferences. He is the founder of ANSA Research Foundation and Comprehensive Trauma Consortium, both non governmental organizations involved in research on neurological disorders. He has also founded the Dhanwantari Trust for providing free medical treatment to the poorer sections of the society and established a free ambulance service, CTC Sanjeevani, in Karnataka. His involvement has been reported in many medical emergencies in and around the state of Karnataka and his contribution is reported in the establishment of the first brain tumour bank in India.

== Awards and recognitions ==
Venkataramana is a recipient of the Silver Jubilee Award of NIMHANS for the best outgoing student in 1986. He has been felicitated by the Rotary International three times (2001, 2003 and 2006) and the Lions Club twice (2001 and 2005). In 2002, he received the Dr. B. C. Roy Award, the highest Indian award in the medical category, followed by Rajiv Gandhi Shiromani Award in 2006 and PRCI Chanakya Award in 2007. The Government of Karnataka awarded him Rajyotsava Prashasti, their second highest civilian award in 2008. He is also a recipient of NTR Award and the 2011 Sir M. Visvesvaraya Global Leadership Award. Karnataka Seva Puraskara Award, Sujayashree Award, Sadhana Rathna Prashasthi, Druvarathna Award, Trinity Vaidya Rathna Award and Dayananda Sagar Award are some of the other honours received by Venkataramana.

== See also ==
- Stereotactic surgery
- Deep brain stimulation
- Stem cell therapy
- Cerebral palsy
- Parkinson's disease
