= Atluri Sriman Narayana =

Indian dental surgeon

A.S. Narayana
- Born: Andhra Pradesh, India
- Occupation: Dental surgeon
- Awards: Padma Shri; B. C. Roy Award; Visishta Puraskara; Dr. Paidi Lakshmaiah Puraskar; TANA Excellency Award; FAMDENT Lifetime Achievement Award

A.S. Narayana is an Indian dental surgeon, a former Professor of Dental Surgery in Government Dental College, Hyderabad and a former State Coordinator of the Andhra Pradesh School Health Services known for the free dental camps he has conducted across the villages in Andhra Pradesh since 1974. He founded the Sai Oral Health Foundation, under the aegis of which he makes weekly trips to the rural areas of the state, conducts medical camps and delivers lectures at schools educating the rural masses about oral hygiene. His efforts are reported to have reached 1.5 million children in 20,000 schools.

Narayana received the B. C. Roy Award, the highest medical award of the Government of India in 1989. He is also a recipient of the Visishta Puraskara from the Government of Andhra Pradesh (1999), Dr. Paidi Lakshmaiah Puraskar from Dr. Paidi Laxmaiah Trust, TANA Excellency Award (2009) and the FAMDENT Lifetime Achievement Award (2010). He was honored again by the Government of India, in 2002, with the fourth highest Indian civilian award of Padma Shri.

== Personal life ==
Narayana is married to Srirama Lakshmi in Hyderabad, India. His oldest son, Sairam Atluri, is the CEO of Stemcures, and is a pain physician practicing in Cincinnati, OH. His younger son, Mohan Atluri, is a maxillofacial surgeon practicing in Hyderabad. He has three grandchildren, Trisha Atluri, Teja Atluri, and Neel Sai Atluri.
