= K. R. Palaniswamy =

Indian gastroenterologist

- Born: Tamil Nadu, India
- Occupations: Gastroenterologist; Medical academic
- Known for: Gastroenterology
- Spouse: Mrs padmini palanisamy
- Awards: Padma Shri

Kallipatti Ramasamy Palaniswamy is an Indian gastroenterologist, medical academic and writer and a senior consultant at Apollo Hospital, Chennai. He is a former president (2004–05) of the Indian Society of Gastroenterology and a patron its Tamil Nadu chapter. After graduating in medicine from JJM Medical College, Davangere in 1972, he continued his studies to secure an MD in general medicine in 1977 and a DM in gastroenterology in 1981, simultaneously working as a member of faculty. In 1986, while working as an assistant professor, he was deputed to Stanley Medical College, Chennai as a professor where he established the department of gastroenterology.

Palaniswamy, who has written several articles on gastroenterology, served as a member of the Academic Boards of the Sanjay Gandhi Postgraduate Institute of Medical Sciences from 1986 to 1996 and Tamil Nadu Dr. M.G.R. Medical University in 1997 and was a member of the Indian delegation for the Academic Exchange programs to Germany in 1986 and to USSR in 1987. He chaired the Mid-Term ISG Conference of 2014 and serves as a National Faculty of the Indian Society of Organ Transplantation (ISOT). A fellow of the Royal College of Physicians of Glasgow, he was awarded the degree of Doctor of Science by Tamil Nadu Dr. M.G.R. Medical University in 2014. The Government of India awarded him the fourth highest civilian honour of the Padma Shri, in 2007, for his contributions to medical science. He is married to Padmini and the family lives in Chennai.
