= Sondur Sriniwasachar =

Indian pathologist

Dr. Sondur Sriniwasachar
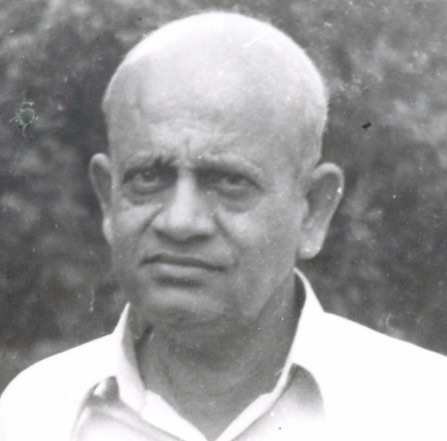
- Sondur in 1978
- Born: 22 June 1922; Bellary, India
- Died: 25 April 1980 (aged 57); Hubli, India
- Education: Stanley Medical College
- Occupation: Doctor of Medicine
- Spouse: Indira Sriniwas (m. 24 May 1950)
- Children: 3

Sondur Sriniwasachar (20 June 1922 – 25 April 1980) was a well-known clinical pathologist of Hubli in the State of Karnataka.

== Early life and education ==
Born in Bellary (under Madras presidency pre-independence India), Sriniwasachar completed his matriculation from The New English Medium High School in the city of Hubli. After graduating from Fergusson College, Pune, with a BSc (Honors) degree in physics and mathematics, he completed his degree in medicine and surgery from Stanley Medical College, Madras (now Chennai) in 1947/48. After completing his senior residency, he set up his private medical practice in Hubli city.

== Career ==
He was the city's first clinical pathologist and held a post-graduate diploma in the subject. Sriniwaschar was also part of initial faculty in the Department of Physiology of Karnataka Medical College (now Karnataka Institute of Medical Sciences), Hubli, first as a full-time reader, and later as a part-time faculty member teaching biochemistry (1959–1977). He was also instrumental in setting up the Biochemistry Lab for Karnataka Cancer Research and Therapy Centre, Hubli (1977–80).

Early in his career he published a leading research paper on Cause & Pathogenesis related to Fatty Cirrhosis of the Liver. The paper was first published in Vol 6 No. 12, December 1952 print of the Indian Journal of Medicine. Sriniwasachar continued his research interests throughout his life with a particular focus on cancers relating to the oesophagus.

A reader, his interests included dabbling in subjects as varied as Physics, Sanskrit, Astronomy, Astrology and Law. And right till the end he continued his deep love for Physics and Mathematics. He also was a frequent contributor to the local language (Kannada) magazine trying to educate the local people the nature, prevention and treatment of many medical problems common in that area. In 1967–68 he compiled an English-Kannada illustrated Dictionary of Science (Vijñāna śabdāvali).
