= Vallalarpuram Sennimalai Natarajan =

Indian geriatric physician (born 1939)

- Born: 6 October 1939 (age 86); Tamil Nadu, India
- Occupation: Geriatric physician
- Awards: Padma Shri; Dr. B. C. Roy Award; British Geriatrics Society Gold Medal; GOT Best Social Worker; Indian Academy of Geriatrics Life Time Achievement Award; National Life Time Achievement Award; M.G.R. Medical University Life Time Achievement Award
- Website: http://www.geriatricsdrvsn.com/

Vallalarpuram Sennimalai Natarajan is an Indian geriatric physician, considered by many as the Father of Geriatric Medicine in India and known to be the first Indian Professor in the discipline. He was honored by the Government of India, in 2012, with the fourth highest Indian civilian award of Padma Shri.

== Biography ==
About 30 to 40 per cent of memory loss is treatable, but many senior citizens suffer its impact without seeking treatment. Pneumonia, which troubles so many elders can be prevented by a vaccine that gives protection for 10 years,says Natarajan, Properly handled, old age can be a good period of life.

Vallalarpuram Sennimalai Natarajan was born on 19 June 1939, in the south Indian state of Tamil Nadu. He graduated in medicine in 1965 and secured a post graduate degree in 1968, both from the University of Madras. Subsequently, he went to UK for higher training in geriatric medicine at the General Hospital, Southampton in 1973 and obtained the degree of MRCP and accreditation as a specialist in geriatric medicine from the Joint Committee on Higher Medical Training, UK. Later, he also got the Fellowship of the Royal College of Physicians of Edinburgh, (FRCP) in 1987.

Natarajan started his career, in 1974, at the Government General Hospital, Chennai. In four years, he is reported to have succeeded in opening a dedicated out patient wing at the hospital for geriatric medicine in 1978, which was later expanded into a ward with 10 beds, in 1988. In 1986, Natarajan shifted to Madras Medical College as the first Professor of geriatric medicine. During his tenure there, he is known to have succeeded in launching a post graduate course (MD) at the institution in 1996.

Natarajan lives in Chennai, pursuing his social activities with Senior Citizens Bureau, delivering keynote addresses at various conferences and attending to his duties as the honorary Professor of Geratric Medicine at Tamil Nadu Dr. M.G.R. Medical University.

== Achievements and legacy ==
Natarajan, considered by many as the physician who popularized geriatric medicine in India, is reported to be the first Indian to obtain a specialization in the medical branch of geriatric medicine and is the first Professor of the discipline in the country. During his tenure at the Government Hospital, Chennai, he was successful in establishing an out patient centre dedicated to geriatric healthcare. He is also credited with launching a post graduate course (MD) in geriatric medicine during his service as the Professor at the Madras Medical College, Chennai.

On his retirement from Government service, Natarajan joined the Senior Citizens Bureau, a Chennai-based non governmental organization working for the welfare of the elderly citizens and is its incumbent chairman. Under the aegis of the forum, he has contributed in the setting up a number of programs. Adiparashakthi Clinic, a memory clinic along the Flowers Road on Kilpauk is one such venture. The clinic is known to be the first of its kind in Chennai and has a declared mandate to identify issues related to memory loss of people over 50 years and mapping them to distinguish and segregate the cases into medical and ageing problems. The clinic runs free weekly consultations at different villages around Chennai.

The Bureau, under the guidance of Natarajan, has also launched another initiative, the Geriatric Housecall Program, a comprehensive geriatric care program covering house calls, liaison with academics, lab service, nursing service and issuance of certificates. The service has been kept open to persons over 70 while people over 60 are also accommodated in case they suffer restricted mobility. The plans are afoot to widen the canvass of services to other cities such as Madurai and Tiruchi.

Natarajan is associated with SeniorIndian.com, a web portal trying to provide information and guidance services to the elderly citizens, working as the chief consultant of their information wing. His efforts are also reported in the establishment of a journal for the elderly people under the name, Link Age. He has assisted in the making of a 1981 documentary, Senior Citizens, produced by the Films Division of India, a production house owned by the Government of India and has featured in a telefilm, Twilight Years, to propagate his views He serves as a member of the National Council on Ageing and Older Persons (NCOP), a Government of India agency operating under the Ministry of Social Justice and Empowerment. Natarajan has also authored several books on the topic of geriatric medicine and healthcare for the elderly.

- After 60
- Burden of Love
- An Update on Geriatrics
- Healthy Nutrition for Healthy Ageing
- Marathiku Goodbye (Goodbye to Old Age)
- Meendum Oru Vasantham (Another Spring)
- Mind Your Mind
- Oru Alamarathin Kadhai (The Story of a Banyan Tree)
- Parkinson's syndrome
- Play the Innings as you like it
- Healthy Ageing: A Guide to Good Health in the Later Years

== Awards and recognitions ==
Naarajan is a recipient of the B. C. Roy National Award in 1994. In 1997, the British Geriatric Society awarded a Gold Medal to Natarajan, on the occasion of its 50th anniversary. The Government of Tamil Nadu selected him, in 2007, as the Best Social Worker. He has also received Lifetime Achievement Awards from the Indian Academy of Geriatrics in 2009, from the Ministry of Social Justice and Empowerment in 2010 and from the Tamil Nadu Dr. M.G.R. Medical University, the same year. In 2012, the Government of India included Natarajan in the Republic Day honours list for the civilian award of Padma Shri.

== See also ==
- Geriatrics
- Government General Hospital, Chennai
- Tamil Nadu Dr. M.G.R. Medical University
- Madras Medical College
