= M.L. Kulkarni =

Indian pediatrician and genetician

Muralidhar Laxmanrao Kulkarni is an Indian pediatrician and genetician who headed the Department of Paediatrics at J.J.M. Medical College, Davangere. He joined J.J.M. Medical College in 1975 as lecturer in pediatrics and was chosen to head the department in 1993. He is the youngest recipient of the prestigious Dr. B. C. Roy Award of Medical Council of India as an eminent medical teacher in 1994. He was also the founder president of Karnataka hemophilia society.

== Biography ==
Kulkarni was born in Dharwad, India on September 8, 1947. He did his early schooling in Dharwad, then studied at Karnataka Institute of Medical Sciences, where he got his MBBS in 1971 and in 1975 his MD in pediatrics.
