= Daljit Singh (ophthalmologist) =

Indian ophthalmologist

- Born: 11 October 1934; Amritsar, Punjab, British India
- Died: 27 December 2017 (aged 83); Amritsar, Punjab, India
- Occupation: Ophthalmologist
- Years active: 1957–2017
- Known for: First to introduce intraocular lens in India, in 1976
- Spouse: Swaran Kaur (?–2007; her death)
- Children: 2
- Awards: Padma Shri; Dr. B. C. Roy Award

Daljit Singh (11 October 1934 – 27 December 2017) was an Indian ophthalmologist. He was an honorary surgeon to Giani Zail Singh, President of India.

== Early life and education ==
Daljit Singh was born on 11 October 1934 to Sahib Singh, a Sikh academic of Sikh literature. Daljit was enrolled at Khalsa School. After encouragement from a family member who was a medical doctor, he began studying to become one as well. He was pre-medical at Khalsa College, then graduated in medicine with a MBBS from the Government Medical College, Amritsar in 1956. After receiving his Bachelors of medicine and surgery, he performed a "house job" in ophthalmology and earned an ophthalmic diploma (DOMS). After working for two years, he earned a master's degree (MS) in ophthalmology in 1963, and eventually earned a Doctor of Science (DSc) qualification.

== Career ==
For more than two years, Dr. Singh worked as a general practitioner in the rural hinterland and also performed eye surgery. After obtaining his master's degree, Singh returned in May 1964 to Amritsar as a senior lecturer in ophthalmology. He later transferred to Government Medical College, Patiala, for five years.

Singh served as a member of faculty of the Government Medical Colleges in Amritsar and Patiala for 23 years and became an Emeritus professor of the institutions.

He did pioneering work in lens implants beginning in 1976 and the Fugo technique "plasma scalpel" for glaucoma and cataract surgeries. He was an innovator with Trans-ciliary Filtration (invented in 2001) and the Pre-Tenon Tangential Micro Track Filtration. He was the discoverer of lymphatics in the eye.

He wrote over a dozen books on ophthalmology, and also a non-technical book Naroi Akh (Healthy Eye) in Punjabi decades ago.

== Other endeavors ==
Singh was Aam Aadmi Partys unsuccessful candidate from Amritsar for the 2014 Lok Sabha election. He later joined the Congress after a rift with AAP.

He was also a poet, writing three volumes of poetry:Dharti Tirhai, Sidhre Bol and Babre Bol, that have been translated into Urdu, English and Hindi. He also wrote three anthologies of essays: Sach di Bhal Vich (In search of truth) Dooja Passa (The other side) and Badi di Jarh (The root of evil) to educate the rural masses about national and international issues, and the role of mass media in spreading misinformation. He has motivated thousands of young minds to challenge the ideas presented to them, and go the extra mile to seek out the truth.

== Honors and awards ==
The Government of India awarded him the fourth highest civilian award of Padma Shri in 1987. Seven years later, he received Dr. B. C. Roy Award, the highest Indian medical award from the Medical Council of India in 1994.

== Personal life ==
Singh was married in 1957 to Swaran Kaur until her death in 2007. His two sons —and their wives—are also eye doctors.

After a chronic illness and being bedridden for a month, Singh died on 27 December 2017 aged 83.
