= Stanley Medical College =

Medical college hospital in Chennai, India

- அரசு ஸ்டான்லி மருத்துவக் கல்லூரி
- Motto: Brotherhood, Teamwork, Tolerance
- Type: Public medical college
- Established: July 2, 1938; 88 years ago
- Affiliations: The Tamil Nadu Dr. M.G.R. Medical University
- Dean: Dr. A. Aravind
- Location: Royapuram, Chennai, 600 001; TN, India, Chennai, Tamil Nadu, India; 13.106225°N 80.286745°E
- Campus: Urban
- Nickname: Stanleans (stanlions)

Stanley Medical College (SMC) is a public medical college located in Chennai, Tamil Nadu, India. Established in 1938, it is one of the oldest medical schools in India.

The medical college and the hospital include a Centre of Excellence for Hand and Reconstructive Microsurgery and a separate cadaver maintenance unit, the first in the country. By legacy, the hospital's anatomy department receives corpses for scientific study from the Monegar Choultry from which the hospital historically descended.

== History ==
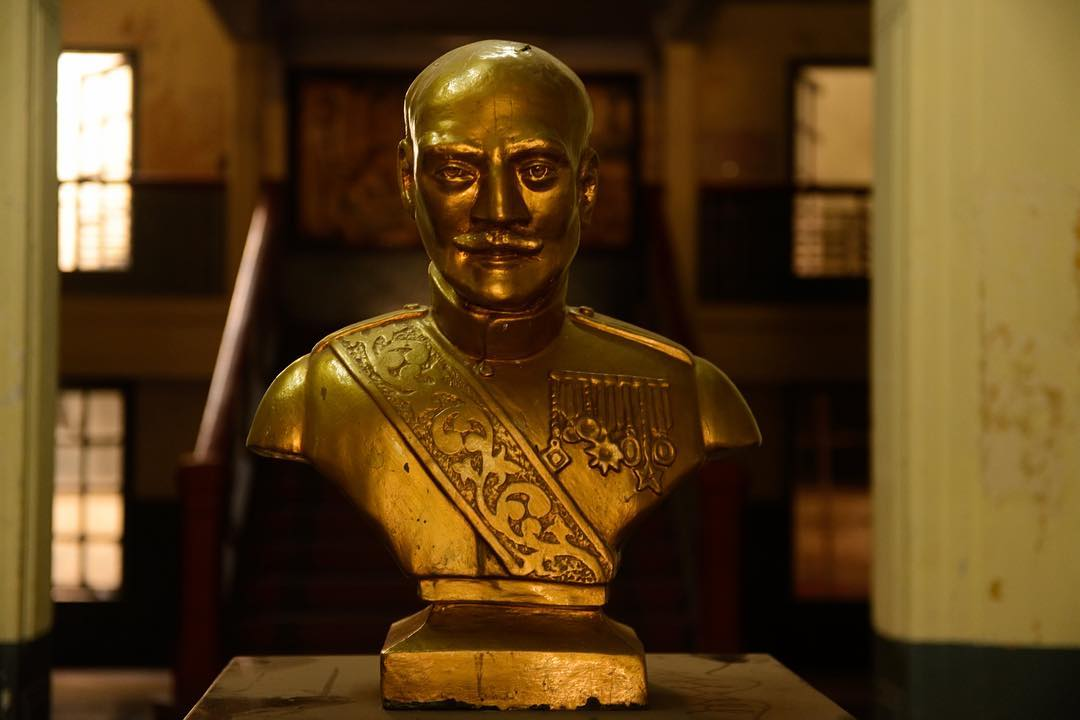
Statue of George Fredrick Stanley

Stanley Medical College and Hospitals is one of the oldest centers in India in the field of medical education. The seed for this institution was sown as early as 1740 when the East India Company first created the medical department. The Stanley Hospital now stands on the old site of the Monegar Choultry established in 1782. In 1799, the Madras Native Infirmary was established with Monegar Choultry and leper asylum providing medical services.

In 1830, philanthropist Raja Sir Ramasamy Mudaliar endowed a hospital and dispensary in the Native Infirmary. In 1836, Madras University established M.B. & G.M. and L.M & S medical courses in the Native Infirmary. In 1903, a hospital assistant course was introduced with the help of the East India Company. In 1911, the first graduating class was awarded their Licensed Medical Practitioner (LMP) diplomas.

In 1933, a five-year D.M. & S (Diploma in Medicine & Surgery) course was inaugurated by Lt. Colonel Sir George Fredrick Stanley, a British parliamentarian. The school was named after him by the Governor of Madras Presidency on 2 July 1938. In 1941, three medical and surgical units were created. This was expanded to seven medical and surgical units in 1964. In 1938, 72 students studied, and then from 1963, 150 students were admitted each year.

In 1990, the Institute of Social Paediatrics was established. Initially established as a centre for children and for improving research programmes. The institute houses several departments of the hospital including nephrology, dermatology, and neurology and provides treatment for adult patients from Stanley.

== Hospital ==
The college is associated with the Government Stanley Hospital which has 1580 beds for in-patient treatment. The hospital has an out-patient attendance of around 5000 patients per day. It has an 8-storey surgical complex equipped to perform up to 40 surgeries simultaneously, and a separate pediatrics block with all specialities under one roof.

== Admissions ==
Admissions to Bachelor of Medicine and Surgery (MBBS) and post-graduate (MD, MS, other diplomas and higher specialties) are through state (85% seats) and national (15%) entrance examinations. Reservations of seats and reduced tuition are available to reserved communities. Admissions are open only to Indian citizens and are highly competitive. Admissions to the MBBS program (about 250 seats per year) are based on NEET (National Eligibility cum Entrance Test). Several seats in post-graduate programs are reserved for physicians in government service.

== Affiliated hospitals ==
- Government Stanley Hospital, Chennai
- Government Raja Sir Ramasamy Mudaliar Lying-in Hospital, Chennai
- Government Hospital for Thoracic Medicine, Tambaram, Chennai
- Government Peripheral Hospital, Tondiarpet, Chennai

== Notable alumni ==
- Vilayanur S. Ramachandran, Neurologist and Cognitive Science researcher
- Govindappa Venkataswamy, founder of Aravind Eye Hospitals
- Ramaswami Venkataswami, founder of IRRH & DPS (Hand Rehabilitation / Plastic Surgery)
- Mirudhubashini Govindarajan, Infertility Expert, Founder and Clinical Director Women's Center and Hospitals
- Lakshmanan Sathyavagiswaran, Chief Medical Examiner-Coroner for the County of Los Angeles
- C. U. Velmurugendran, Padma Shri recepiant and former Chief of Neurology (Stanley and Madras Medical College)
- N. Mathrubootham, Psychiatrist
- Sondur Sriniwasachar professor of Bio-chemistry at Karnataka Institute of Medical Sciences
- Thomas Thomas The first Indian Cardiothoracic surgeon.
- Mohammed Rela, liver transplant surgeon, Director & Chairman of Dr. Rela Institute and Medical centre, Crompet, Chennai and Chancellor of Bharath Institute of Higher Education and Research
- Prathap C. Reddy, founder of Apollo Hospitals
- Natesan Rangabashyam, Gastroenterologist and Padma Bhushan recipient
- Thenumgal Poulose Jacob, Vascular surgeon and Padma Shri recipient
- K. R. Palaniswamy, Gastroenterologist and Padma Shri recipient
- Subramanian Kalyanaraman, neurosurgeon, Shanti Swarup Bhatnagar laureate
- Ganesan Venkatasubramanian, psychiatrist, Shanti Swarup Bhatnagar laureate
- Belle Monappa Hegde Cardiologist Padma Bhushan recipient
- T. M. A. Pai, Founder of Manipal University, KMC, Manipal
- C. Palanivelu, surgeon
- Ponnusamy Venugopal, Physician, Member of Parliament, Lok Sabha

== See also ==
- Healthcare in Chennai
