= Hanumantha Rao Pasupuleti =

Indian paediatrician and social worker

- Occupations: Paediatrician and social worker
- Organization: Sweekaar Group
- Awards: Padma Shri (2023)

Hanumantha Rao Pasupuleti is an Indian paediatrician and social worker known for his contributions to developmental paediatrics, rehabilitation medicine, and psychology. Rao is the founder of the Sweekaar Group.

In 2023, he was conferred the Padma Shri, India's fourth-highest civilian award in Delhi for his contribution in Medicine.

== Career ==
In 1977, Rao Pasupuleti established the 'Sweekaar Rehabilitation Centre' to help individuals and children with disabilities. It was later renamed the 'Sweekaar Academy of Rehabilitation Sciences. Under the umbrella of Sweekaar Academy, Rao established Institutes of Special Education, Speech and Audiology, and Mental Health to support individuals with disabilities.

== Awards ==
- 1994 : Received B.C. Roy National Award for Socio-Medical Relief for 1994 received from Dr. Shankar Dayal Sharma, former President of India on 9 November 1995
- 1996: Received the Man Of Asia Award in the field of handicapped welfare from the International Peace Foundation in London.
- Received the Gem of India Award in recognition of his contributions to society in the medical field.
- 2023: Awarded the Padma Shri in Delhi by the President of India, Droupadi Murmu in the field of Medicine.
