= Moolchand Kharaiti Ram Hospital =

Hospital in New Delhi, India

Geography
- Location: Lajpat Nagar, New Delhi, India

Organisation
- Type: Private

History
- Founded: 1958

Links
- Website: www.moolchandhealthcare.com

Moolchand Kharaiti Ram Hospital commonly known as Moolchand Hospital is a private hospital located in Lajpat Nagar, New Delhi.

The hospital was founded by Sardari Lal after the partition of India in 1951. Moolchand is his grandfather name and Kharaiti Ram was his uncle. Currently, hospital is run by Moolchand Kharaiti Ram trust.

As per media report of 2020, hospital has 140 beds and it had also functioned as COVID hospital centre by Delhi Govt during first wave in June 2020. Hospital has been running on govt provided land.

The hospital is on the panel of Central Government Health Scheme, Government of India and Delhi Government Employment Health Scheme(DGEHS). Hospital is NABH and NABL accredited.
