= Shally Awasthi =

Indian epidemiologist

- Born: 7 September 1958 (age 68); Lucknow
- Education: MD, DNB
- Spouse: Dr. Rajiv Awasthi
- Scientific career
- Fields: Paediatric Pulmonology, Infectious & Parasitic Diseases, Clinical Trials
- Workplaces: King George's Medical University

Shally Awasthi is an Indian professor and pediatric pulmonologist. She worked at King George's Medical University. Awasthi was the first Indian scientist to be appointed to the Health-Security Interface Technical Advisory Group (HSI-TAG) of the World Health Organization (WHO). HSI-TAG comprises a group of experts formed to advise the WHO on worldwide issues concerning global health and security.

== Honors and awards ==
Awasthi is an elected fellow of all major Indian science academies namely the National Academy of Science, Indian Academy of Sciences, The National Academy of Medical Science, Indian National Science Academy 2020 and Indian Academy of Pediatrics. She was an Honorary Fellow of Royal College of Pediatrics and Child Health for 2018.

The Department of Science and Technology Government of India honored her with its National Award for Outstanding Efforts in Science & Technology Communication through innovative and traditional methods in 2016. The Indian Council of Medical Research of the Government of India awarded her the Basanti Devi Amir Chand Award-2016, Amrut Mody Unichem Prize-2010, Dr HB Dingley Memorial Award-1996. The Medical Council of India awarded her the Bidhan Chandra Roy Award for 2003–2004. She has been awarded Mridula Kamboj Memorial Lecture Oration Award, NASI, 2020. She has been listed in the top 2% of scientists in Pediatrics.

== Scholarly writings ==
Awasthi has been involved in a multitude of research papers, many being focused on children's health. Her more recent research papers are Blood Lead Levels in India's children, Bronchial Asthma, and ALRI-RSV. The Blood Lead Level research ended up leading to discover that kids in the 10 tested cities have a Blood-Lead Level of over 4ߎg/dl. The Bronchial Asthma was to test how much the parents knew about their children's disease by a 31-question quiz. Most parents tested scored lower than 16, the average being 14±1. The ALRI-RSV research paper was to try and estimate the amount ALRI would grow in children under 5 from 2005 to 2015. Awasthi and her fellow researchers had estimated that between 21.6 million and 50.3 million people would have problems with both ALRI-RSV globally, while only 1.2 million to 1.7 million people would go to the hospital about it. It's also estimated that out of those 1.2 million to 1.7 million people who go to the hospital, around 20,300 to 36,200 people will die due to them, while global fatalities from them would be somewhere between 94,600 and 149,400 people.
