= Verbal autopsy =

Method of gathering health information about a deceased individual

Verbal autopsy (VA) is a method of gathering information about symptoms and circumstances for a deceased individual to determine their cause of death. Health information and a description of events prior to death are acquired from conversations or interviews with a person or persons familiar with the deceased and analyzed by health professionals or computer algorithms to assign likely cause(s) of death.

Verbal autopsy is used in settings where most deaths are otherwise undocumented, which typically means in low- and middle-income countries. Estimates suggest a majority of the 60 million annual global deaths occur without medical attention or official medical certification of the cause of death. VA attempts to establish causes of death for otherwise undocumented subjects, allowing scientists to analyze disease patterns and direct public health policy decisions.

Noteworthy large-scale uses of the verbal autopsy method include the Million Death Study in India, China's national program to document causes of death in rural areas, the Global Burden of Disease Study 2010, and the INDEPTH Network multi-site study. VA is increasingly recognised as an important component of national CRVS (civil registration and vital statistics) systems.

== Origins ==
The term verbal autopsy was first coined in a project of the Department of International Health of Johns Hopkins School of Hygiene and Public Health which ran from 1965 to 1973 in Punjab, India. Two research projects were located in villages near Ludhiana, with headquarters in Narangwal village. Objectives of the projects were

1. to assess the relationships between nutrition, infection and child development, and
2. the acceptance of family planning services by rural communities in response to maternal and early child care service packages. Main providers of health care were Lady Health Visitors (LHVs) and Auxiliary Nurse Midwives (ANMs) resident in each of the study villages in the nutrition- and population studies, respectively. All had received a six-week training prior to onset of the program, followed by monthly reviews, re-training and feed-back on service aspects specific to their group of villages. Input services in the Nutrition villages originally consisted of "feeding centres" and health care for under-5s, and on maternal and newborn health care services in the population cells. Early in 1971, results from the nutrition villages showed no significant decrease in child mortality, and causes and circumstances of child deaths had remained largely unknown. In response, an information system was established, wherein all child deaths in the villages had to be reported to the Narangwal Project Office by the resident health worker within five days. One of the project physicians then went to the concerned family and through intense questioning of close relatives as to the signs and symptoms of the process leading to death, review of the child's health records, supplemented by visits to the external health care provider if such was the case, established possible reasons for, and a most likely cause of death. Using this method and following an analysis of the initial 45 deaths, diarrheal disease, lower respiratory tract infections and malnutrition were identified as the three principal causes among the 8 days to 3-year-old children. Among the 45, one had died from neonatal tetanus. Shortly thereafter, the same process was extended to all villages of the two projects featuring childcare as one of the service inputs. In response to the results, intervention methodologies specific to identified health care priorities were elaborated and introduced in both projects. In 1972, results from the investigation were presented for 124 child deaths during the first seven days of life, and 117 deaths from 8 days to 5 years of age at a conference in Srinagar, Kashmir. The term Verbal Autopsy was used 'in irony' by a visiting medical dignitary who not only questioned the results but also the method, labelling it "unscientific". The term was retained by the then director of the two projects, Carl E. Taylor, chairman of the Department of International Health who also chaired the conference. Through introduction of specific service packages specifically for the control of DD, ARI, and Neonatal Tetanus, child mortality dropped significantly in the study villages of both the Nutrition and Population projects.

Seven years later (1980), the Ministry of Health of Egypt conducted an investigation for prevention of child mortality from DD using a variety of intervention methods for a total population of 200,000, including 29000 children below the age of 5 in three different districts. The VA method as originally developed in Narangwal was slightly modified to the Egyptian setting and again used to identify prevailing mortality patterns among preschoolers. Following implementation of different treatment schedules, child mortality rates dropped significantly in specific input villages over the period of study. The project site was re-visited six years following completion of the investigation confirming utility and effectiveness of the VA method, and applied intervention modalities respectively.

== Development ==
Many iterations and variations of the questionnaires used in VA have been developed by health professionals and researchers. The World Health Organization (WHO), exercising its global mandate to set norms and standards for health, published a book outlining VA standards in 2007. At that time, the emphasis was primarily on standard paper questionnaires that could subsequently be evaluated by physicians to assign causes of death.

However, work was already underway in parallel to develop methods for automatically processing VA interview material, because the time, cost and consistency with which physicians were able to assign causes of death to VA interview material were major constraints on the overall process, particularly for large-scale approaches. Additionally, the reason that many deaths were not certified routinely in resource-challenged settings was often associated with a lack of available physicians. Tentative versions of automatic methods were tested in Vietnam in 2003 and in Ethiopia in 2006. Methodological development was led by Prof. Peter Byass at the Umeå Centre for Global Health Research in Sweden, and the name InterVA (for Interpreting Verbal Autopsy) was coined.

As it became increasingly clear that automated interpretation of VA was a promising approach, WHO gave further attention to the structure of the VA interview from the perspective that the interview material might be automatically processed. In 2012 WHO published the first VA standard that was specifically designed for automated processing, defining both interview questions and cause of death categories linked to ICD-10. This was followed by the release of the InterVA-4 model which directly corresponded to the 2012 WHO standard. The open-access InterVA-4 knowledge base was also incorporated into the related InsilicoVA model, which set out to analyse standard VA data using a more complex statistical method.

Around the same time, the Population Health Metrics Research Consortium (PHMRC) were undertaking an empirical study based at several tertiary hospitals to collect a reference database linking clinically investigated final illnesses to subsequent VA interviews. This was envisaged as a knowledge base for building automated VA models, and several possible strategies were proposed at a conference in Indonesia in 2011. The reference database was subsequently made publicly available. However, it was not fully compliant with the 2012 WHO VA standard for VA interviews or cause of death categories. An automated model called SmartVA-Analyze, based on the content of the PHMRC reference database and using the Tariff model, was subsequently released.

On October 1, 2019, Bloomberg Philanthropies announced it would spend $120 million over the next four years to develop verbal autopsies in 25 countries.

== Current status ==
In order to harmonize the various VA standards and approaches in use, WHO undertook further revisions and generated a 2016 WHO VA standard. This 2016 WHO standard included all the items from the 2012 WHO version plus all the items from the SmartVA tool as an important strategy for the revision. On the same principle that the 2016 WHO standard was intended to harmonise and unify available VA resources, InterVA-5 was released during 2018 as an integrating model which has the capacity to process input data in the 2012 WHO, SmartVA or 2016 WHO formats and generate causes of death according to the 2016 WHO standard.

Because of the substantial errors involved in turning a list of VA symptoms (without a physical autopsy) into a cause of death, adding these up in naive ways can produce massive bias. Fortunately, public health professionals are interested in the population prevalence the causes of death rather than the cause for any one individual death. This enabled statisticians to develop special statistical methods that actually skip the step of classifying any individual and instead optimize, much more accurately, for the aggregate, population goal of primary interest.
