= C. Palanivelu =

Indian surgeon

Dr C. Palanivelu
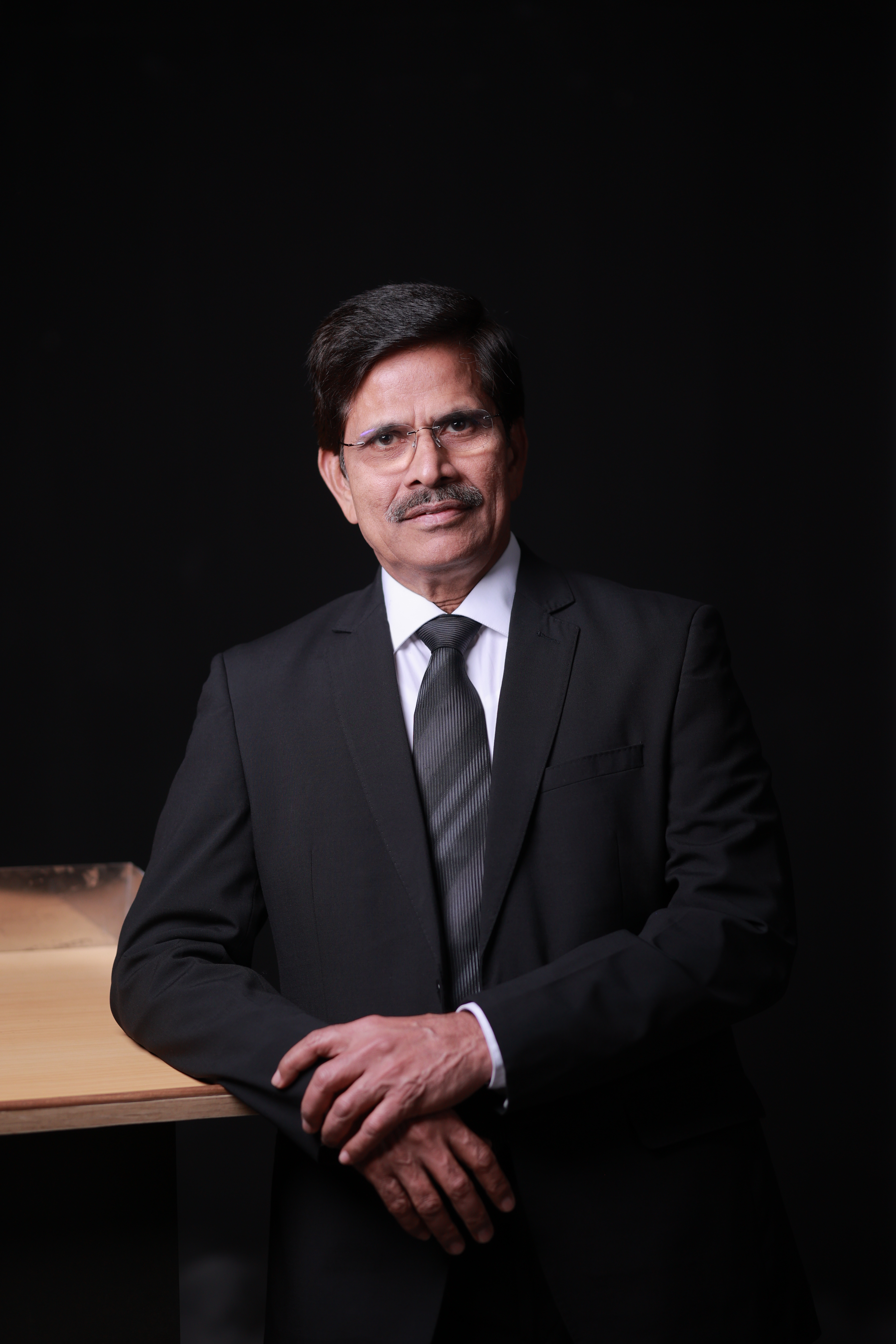
- Born: Avarankattupudur, Paramathi Velur, Namakkal, Tamil Nadu, India
- Education: Stanley Medical College
- Occupation: General surgeon
- Parent: Chinnusamy
- Awards: Lifetime Achievement Award International congress on cancer 2016

C. Palanivelu is a gastrosurgeon in the state of Tamil Nadu, India, recognised as a pioneer of laparoscopic surgery in South India.

== Early life ==
Palanivelu was born into a poor farming family in the small village of Avarankattupudur in Namakkal district, Tamil Nadu. Due to drought in his village and the resulting poverty, his family emigrated to Malaysia, where he worked as a daily-wage labourer on a palm oil estate for five years.

After returning to India, he was determined to rejoin school and completed his schooling at the age of 21. During his youth, his sister died of pneumonia at the age of six. The lack of medical facilities in his village, which left many residents untreated for diseases, injuries, and cancer, motivated him to pursue a career in medicine.

== Education and early career ==
He enrolled in medical studies at Stanley Medical College, Chennai, at the age of 21 in 1971. After completing his MS in Surgery and MCh in Gastroenterology, he began his medical career at the age of 40, joining the faculty of Coimbatore Medical College, Coimbatore.

In 1991, he founded the Coimbatore Institute of Gastrointestinal Endo-Surgery (CIGES), where he trained surgeons from across India in laparoscopic procedures over the following decade. In 2001, he founded GEM Hospital and Research Centre in Coimbatore, described as Asia's first exclusive gastroenterology and advanced laparoscopic surgery centre. He is the founder president of the Association of Minimal Access Surgeons of India (AMASI) and of the Indian Society for Diseases of Esophagus and Stomach (ISES), and served as President of the Association of Surgeons of India in 2007.

He has since published an autobiography titled GUTS. A Hindi-language edition of the book was released in New Delhi in January 2026 by Vice President C. P. Radhakrishnan, who described it as a testament to courage, perseverance, and ethical innovation in medicine; Minister of State for Railways Ravneet Singh also attended the release.

== Surgical innovations ==
Palanivelu is credited with developing or performing several surgical techniques for the first time:

- Palanivelu's technique of esophagectomy — a new technique for esophageal cancer named after him, involving thoracoscopic mobilisation of the esophagus and mediastinal lymphadenectomy with the patient in the prone position.
- Laparoscopic Whipple operation for pancreatic cancer — first performed in the world. He later led a randomised clinical trial comparing laparoscopic and open pancreatoduodenectomy for periampullary tumours, published in the British Journal of Surgery.
- Choledochal cyst laparoscopic excision & hepatojejunostomy
- Hydatid cyst excision (Palanivelu's Hydatid Trocar System) — a specialised trocar-cannula system for laparoscopic management of hepatic hydatid disease, described in a case series of 66 patients. A follow-up series using the same system reported no recurrences over an average follow-up of 5.9 years.
- Single-incision colorectal cancer resection (SAGES award-winning operation)
- Gastrectomy for stomach cancer (keynote address, Japanese Society, 2006)

== Publications ==
Palanivelu has authored several textbooks on laparoscopic surgery, including Palanivelu's Text Book of Surgical Laparoscopy (2002) and the four-volume Art of Laparoscopic Surgery: Textbook and Atlas, now in its second edition (2019). An Anglia Ruskin University biography also credits him with a third title, CIGES Atlas of Laparoscopic Surgery.

== Awards and honours ==
- Lifetime Achievement Award — for his contribution to the field of cancer.
- Fellowship ad hominem, Royal College of Surgeons of Edinburgh — awarded in 2003 in appreciation of his scientific contribution to minimal access surgery at a global level.
- Dr. B. C. Roy National Award — presented by the Indian Medical Association / Government of India in the category of development of a medical specialty (laparoscopic surgery) in 2006, and in the Eminent Medical Person category in 2016.
- International Olympic Silver Medal — first Indian to win this award for surgery, at a competition held in Phoenix, US, in 2009, jointly organised by SAGES and JSES as the first-ever "International Olympic Surgery in MAS."
- Best Paper Award — 6th World Congress of Endoscopic Surgeons, Rome, Italy, 1998, for the paper "Laparoscopic subtotal cholecystectomy."
- Best Video Award, EAES — first Indian to win this award; 16th European Association for Endoscopic Surgery Best Video Award and first prize (€2,500), 2007. Cited as the first and only Indian to win this award to date.
- Best Technique Award, International Society for Diseases of the Esophagus (ISDE) — 10th World Congress of ISDE, Kagoshima, Japan, 2010.
- Honorary Fellowship (Honoris Causa) — awarded by San Marcos University (identified in the source text as "San American university"), Lima, Peru, 2014.
- Gold Medal of Honour — Kazakhstan National Association of Medicine, for significant contribution to the development of surgery, at the Pan-Russian Countries Medical Conference, Astana, 2013.
- Top Two Great Surgeons — first Indian honoured by the European Association of Endoscopic Surgeons for significant contribution to the development of laparoscopic surgery, World Congress of Endoscopic Surgery, Paris, June 2014 (alongside Prof. John Hunter, US).
- M. R. Hulinaykar Lifetime Achievement Award — announced in 2026 by Dr. Raman M. Hulinaykar, director of the Sridevi Group of Educational Institutions, recognising Palanivelu's contributions to laparoscopic and robotic surgery.

== Public recognition ==
Palanivelu met the President of India, Droupadi Murmu, at Rashtrapati Bhavan, where he presented her with a copy of his autobiography.
