= Government Medical College and Hospital, Chandigarh =

Medical college in Chandigarh, India

Government Medical College & Hospital, Chandigarh
- Motto: In service of humanity
- Type: Public
- Established: 1991; 35 years ago
- Affiliations: National Medical Commission
- Academic affiliations: Panjab University
- Director-Principal: Dr. Ravneet Kaur
- Location: Chandigarh, India; 30.709°N 76.781°E
- Campus: Urban
- Website: gmch.gov.in

Government Medical College and Hospital, Chandigarh a medical school and a tertiary care hospital is located in Chandigarh, India. The medical school is administered by Panjab University. It was established in 1991 and has a 36 acres (15 ha) campus located in Sector 32, Chandigarh.

== Courses ==
The Medical College has an intake of 200 students towards the MBBS degree. It also offers postgraduate courses (M.Phil./MD/MS) in several medical and surgical subjects.

== History ==
The Government Medical College, Chandigarh was started in the year 1991 in Prayaas building, Sector 38 as an attempt to establish a centre of undergraduate excellence to support the Post Graduate Institute of Medical Education and Research. The foundation stone was laid by the erstwhile Prime Minister of India, Chandra Shekhar on 20 January 1991 on land allotted by the Chandigarh Administration. Construction for this college and hospital started in 1991 itself.

== Campus ==
The 36 acres (15 ha) campus is housed in Sector 32 and has 5 blocks of hospital and a dedicated building for the college.

== Administration ==
GMCH was headed by Jagjit Singh Chopra, a Padma Bhushan awardee, who served as the founder director-principal. The incumbent Director-Principal is Dr. Ravneet Kaur.

== Rankings ==
University and college rankings

Medical – India
- Government colleges
- Outlook India (2022): 10

The college was ranked 10 among government medical colleges in India in 2022 by Outlook India.
