= Prabhat Jha (epidemiologist) =

Indian-Canadian epidemiologist

Prabhat Jha OC
- Born: February 12, 1965 (age 61); Ranchi, Jharkhand, India
- Education: University of Manitoba (MD); University of Oxford (DPhil)
- Occupation: Epidemiologist
- Father: Bidhu Jha
- Awards: Full list

Prabhat Jha OC (born February 12, 1965) is an Indian-Canadian epidemiologist currently working in the field of global health.

Jha is the founding director of the Centre for Global Health Research at St. Michael’s Hospital in Toronto, Ontario. His research focuses primarily on premature mortality resulting from HIV/AIDS, tobacco, alcohol, malaria, maternal, and child health, infectious and non-communicable diseases.

== Early life ==
Jha was born in Ranchi, India the state of Jharkhand. When he was six years old, his family moved to Winnipeg, Canada where his father, Bidhu Jha, worked as a civil engineer and went on to become an NDP member of Manitoba’s legislative assembly. Together, with his older brother and younger sister, he was raised by his mother.

== Education and career ==
Jha studied medicine at the University of Manitoba. After earning his Doctor of Medicine degree, he attended the University of Oxford in England as a Rhodes Scholar where he was mentored by statistician and epidemiologist Sir Richard Peto. He successfully defended his PhD in epidemiology and public health in 1992.

After graduation, Jha worked as a team leader at the World Bank, contributing to the development of the Second National HIV/AIDS Control Program in India. He later worked as a senior scientist in health and poverty for the World Health Organization’s Commission on Macroeconomics and Health.

In 2002, he founded the Centre for Global Health Research at St. Michael's Hospital in Toronto, where he has directed a variety of large scale public health studies, most notably the Indian Million Death Study on premature mortality. Jha’s research focuses on the causes of premature death in developing countries worldwide, and he has been recognized internationally for his work on smoking and tobacco related mortality. He is also a member of the Disease Control Priorities Project.

Jha has been a Senior Fellow of Massey College at the University of Toronto, Canada since 2006 and in 2007 he became a professor of epidemiology at the Dalla Lana School of Public Health, University of Toronto. In 2010, Jha was appointed the inaugural Endowed Chair in Disease Control at the Dalla Lana School. In 2019, Jha was appointed University Professor at the University of Toronto, recognizing his outstanding scholarly achievement and contributions to the field of public health. In 2024, Jha was appointed Nuffield Professor of Population Health and Head of Department.

Jha has been an elected foreign member of the US National Academy of Medicine in the National Academies of Sciences, Engineering, and Medicine since 2016. Jha has also been an elected fellow of the Royal Society of Canada since 2018.

Jha has served as a health advisor to several governments including the Government of Canada on the Ministerial Advisory Committee on Tobacco Control, the Government of South Africa on its National Health Insurance Expert Committee, and the Government of India on the Advisory Committee for the National AIDS Control Organization.

He was a founding senior editor of the scientific journal eLife from 2011–2018 and is an International Advisory Board Member for The Lancet Global Health journal.

Jha is the lead researcher behind the Action to Beat Coronavirus (Ab-C) study, where Unity Health, the University of Toronto and the Angus Reid Forum have teamed up to look at the prevalence of COVID-19 antibodies among 10,000 Canadians.

== Awards and honours ==
- Rhodes Scholar, University of Oxford, Oxford, England (1989–92)
- Top 40 Canadians under Age 40 Award (2003)
- The Ontario Premier’s Research Excellence Award (2004)
- The Luther Terry Award from the American Cancer Society for Research on Tobacco Control (2012) “for Ground breaking Research on Tobacco Control”
- Officer of the Order of Canada (2012) “For his contributions to epidemiology and the economics of global health, which have influenced the development of global health policy”
- Elected Fellow, Royal Society of Canada (2018)
- Elected Foreign Member, US National Academy of Medicine (2016)
- CIHR Trailblazer Award, Inaugural Award in Population Health Solutions (2016)
- Alumni Achievement Award, Youth Parliament of Manitoba

== Selected publications ==
- Prabhat Jha (1999). Curbing the Epidemic: Governments and the Economics of Tobacco Control. World Bank Publications. ISBN 978-0-8213-4519-1.
- Prabhat Jha, Frank Chaloupka (eds) (2000) Tobacco Control in Developing Countries, Oxford University Press, ISBN 0192632469
- Dean T Jamison, Joel G Breman, Anthony R Measham, George Alleyne, Mariam Claeson, David B Evans, Prabhat Jha, Anne Mills, and Philip Musgrove (eds) (2006) Disease Control Priorities in Developing Countries, Washington (DC): World Bank, ISBN 0-8213-6179-1
- Dean T. Jamison, Joel G. Breman, Anthony R. Measham, George Alleyne, Mariam Claeson, David B. Evans, Prabhat Jha, Anne Mills, Philip Musgrove (eds) (2006) Priorities in Health: Disease Control Priorities Companion Volume, World Bank Publications, ISBN 0821362607
- Harish Kumar Dhingra; Prabhat Nath Jha; Pratima Bajpai (2011). Current Topics in Biotechnology and Microbiology: Recent Trends. Lambert Academic Publishing. ISBN 978-3-8443-2975-9.
- "Effects of ramipril on cardiovascular and microvascular outcomes in people with diabetes mellitus: Results of the HOPE study and MICRO-HOPE substudy. Heart Outcomes Prevention Evaluation Study Investigators". Lancet. 355 (9200): 253–259. 2000. doi:10.1016/S0140-6736(99)12323-7. PMID 10675071. S2CID 1863533. 3000+ citations in Web of Science as of 2022
- Black, R. E.; Cousens, S.; Johnson, H. L.; Lawn, J. E.; Rudan, I.; Bassani, D. G.; Jha, P.; Campbell, H.; Walker, C. F.; Cibulskis, R.; Eisele, T.; Liu, L.; Mathers, C. (2010). "Global, regional, and national causes of child mortality in 2008: A systematic analysis". The Lancet. 375 (9730): 1969–87. doi:10.1016/S0140-6736(10)60549-1. PMID 20466419. S2CID 27812760. 600+ citations in Web of Science as of 2013
- Prabhat Jha, Sir Richard Peto (2014) Global Effects of Smoking, of Quitting, and of Taxing Tobacco, NEJM 2014, 370:60-8 doi:10.1056/NEJMra1308383
