= List of Padma Bhushan award recipients (1970–1979) =

List of recipients of a civilian award in India

Padma Bhushan
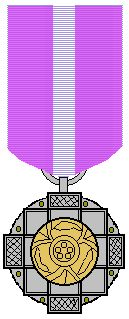
- Type: National Civilian
- Country: India
- Presented by: Government of India
- Ribbon
- Obverse: A centrally located lotus flower is embossed and the text "Padma" written in Devanagari script is placed above and the text "Bhushan" is placed below the lotus.
- Reverse: A platinum State Emblem of India placed in the centre with the national motto of India, "Satyameva Jayate" (Truth alone triumphs) in Devanagari Script
- Established: 1954
- First award: 1954

Highlights
- Total: 205
- Website: http://www.padmaawards.gov.in/

Precedence
- Next (higher): Padma Vibhushan

- Next (lower): Padma Shri

The Padma Bhushan is the third-highest civilian award of the Republic of India. Instituted on 2 January 1954, the award is given for "distinguished service of a high order", without distinction of race, occupation, position, or sex. The recipients receive a Sanad, a certificate signed by the President of India and a circular-shaped medallion with no monetary association. The recipients are announced every year on Republic Day (26 January) and registered in The Gazette of India—a publication used for official government notices and released weekly by the Department of Publication, under the Ministry of Urban Development. The conferral of the award is not considered official without its publication in the Gazette. The name of recipient, whose award have been revoked or restored, both of which require the authority of the President, is archived and they are required to surrender their medal when their name is struck from the register; none of the conferments of Padma Bhushan during 1970–1979 have been revoked or restored. The recommendations are received from all the state and the union territory governments, as well as from Ministries of the Government of India, the Bharat Ratna and the Padma Vibhushan awardees, the Institutes of Excellence, the Ministers, the Chief Ministers and the Governors of State, and the Members of Parliament including private individuals.

When instituted in 1954, the Padma Bhushan was classified as "Dusra Varg" (Class II) under the three-tier Padma Vibhushan awards, which were preceded by the Bharat Ratna in hierarchy. On 15 January 1955, the Padma Vibhushan was reclassified into three different awards as the Padma Vibhushan, the Padma Bhushan and the Padma Shri. The criteria included "distinguished service of a high order in any field including service rendered by Government servants", but excluded those working with the public sector undertakings with the exception of doctors and scientists. The 1954 statutes did not allow posthumous awards; this was subsequently modified in the January 1955 statute. The design was also changed to the form that is currently in use; it portrays a circular-shaped toned bronze medallion 1 3/4 inches (44 mm) in diameter and 1/8 inch (3.2 mm) thick. The centrally placed pattern made of outer lines of a square of 1 3/16-inch (30 mm) side is embossed with a knob carved within each of the outer angles of the pattern. A raised circular space of diameter 1 1/16 inches (27 mm) is placed at the centre of the decoration. A centrally located lotus flower is embossed on the obverse side of the medal and the text "Padma" is placed above and the text "Bhushan" is placed below the lotus written in Devanagari script. The State Emblem of India is displayed in the centre of the reverse side, together with the national motto of India, "Satyameva Jayate" (Truth alone triumphs) in Devanagari script, which is inscribed on the lower edge. The rim, the edges and all embossing on either side is of standard gold with the text "Padma Bhushan" of gold gilt. The medal is suspended by a pink riband 1 1/4 inches (32 mm) in width with a broad white stripe in the middle. It is ranked fifth in the order of precedence of wearing of medals and decorations of the Indian civilian and military awards. (Note: The order of precedence is: Bharat Ratna, Param Vir Chakra, Ashoka Chakra, Padma Vibhushan and Padma Bhushan.)

As the result of the 6th general election held in March 1977, Morarji Desai was sworn in as the Prime Minister of India on 24 March 1977 replacing the Indira Gandhi led government of the Indian National Congress. On 31 July, the newly formed government retracted all the civilian awards including the Padma Bhushan deeming them "worthless and politicized". After the 7th general election of 1980 Gandhi was again sworn in as the Prime Minister and all civilian awards were reinstated on 25 January 1980. Consequently, this award was not presented in 1978 and 1979.

A total of 205 awards were presented in the 1970s – twenty-eight in 1970, followed by forty-one in 1971, fifty in 1972, seventeen in 1973, twenty-one in 1974, fifteen in 1975, sixteen in 1976 and seventeen in 1977. The Padma Bhushan in the 1970s was also conferred upon eight foreign recipients – four from the United States, two from Italy, and one each from Belgium and the United Kingdom. Individuals from nine different fields were awarded, which includes forty-eight from literature and education, forty-three from civil services, thirty-four artists, twenty-six from science and engineering, twenty-one from social work, seventeen from medicine, twelve from trade and industry, three from public affairs, and one sportsperson. Novelist Khushwant Singh, who accepted the award in 1974 in the field of literature and education, returned it in 1984 as a notion of protest against the Operation Blue Star.

== Recipients ==
Award recipients by year
Year	Number of recipients
1970	28
1971	41
1972	50
1973	17
1974	21
1975	15
1976	16
1977	17
1978	0
1979	0

Award recipients by field
Field	Number of recipients
Arts	34
Civil Service	43
Literature & Education	48
Medicine	17
Public Affairs	3
Science & Engineering	26
Social Work	21
Sports	1
Trade & Industry	12

Key
# Indicates a posthumous honour

List of Padma Bhushan award recipients, showing the year, field, and state/country
Year	Image	Laureates	Field	State
1970		Ramkinkar Baij	Arts	West Bengal
1970		Hirabai Barodekar	Arts	Maharashtra
1970		Buddhadeb Bose	Literature & Education	West Bengal
1970		M. R. Brahmam	Civil Service	Andhra Pradesh
1970		Amiya Chakravarty	Literature & Education	West Bengal
1970		T. S. Avinashilingam Chettiar	Literature & Education	Tamil Nadu
1970		Birendra Nath Ganguli	Literature & Education	Delhi
1970		Lala Hansraj Gupta	Public Affairs	Haryana
1970		Ratan Lal Joshi	Literature & Education	Delhi
1970		Gurram Jashuva	Literature & Education	Andhra Pradesh
1970		Narayan Sadoba Kajrolkar	Social Work	Maharashtra
1970		Kumari Kamala	Arts	Tamil Nadu
1970		Purushottam Kashinath Kelkar	Literature & Education	Maharashtra
1970		M. S. Krishnan	Science & Engineering	Tamil Nadu
1970		Syed Abdul Latif	Literature & Education	Andhra Pradesh
1970		Bhagwantrao Mandloi	Public Affairs	Madhya Pradesh
1970		Mahesh Prasad Mehray	Medicine	Uttar Pradesh
1970		Sombhu Mitra	Arts	West Bengal
1970		Vivekananda Mukhopadhyaya	Literature & Education	West Bengal
1970		Krishnaswami Ramiah	Science & Engineering	Tamil Nadu
1970		Gainedi A. Narasimha Rao	Civil Service	Andhra Pradesh
1970		Anant alias Annasaheb Sahasrabuddhe	Social Work	Maharashtra
1970		Surrendar Saini	Social Work	Delhi
1970		Viswanatha Satyanarayana	Literature & Education	Andhra Pradesh
1970		Ahmed Jan Thirakwa	Arts	Uttar Pradesh
1970		N. M. Wagle	Civil Service	Maharashtra
1970		Prem Nath Wahi	Civil Service	Delhi
1970		Yashpal	Literature & Education	Punjab
1971		N. Ramaswami Ayyar	Social Work	Tamil Nadu
1971		Suraj Bhan	Literature & Education	Chandigarh
1971		Gokulbhai Bhatt	Social Work	Rajasthan
1971		Jaishankar Bhojak	Arts	Gujarat
1971		Monindra Nath Chakravarti	Civil Service	West Bengal
1971		Kandathil Mammen Cherian	Literature & Education	Kerala
1971		Jogesh Chandra De	Trade & Industry	West Bengal
1971		Ramrao Deshmukh	Trade & Industry	Maharashtra
1971		Satish Dhawan	Science & Engineering	Karnataka
1971		Bhalchandra Digambar Garware	Trade & Industry	Maharashtra
1971		Gangubai Hangal	Arts	Karnataka
1971		Musiri Subramania Iyer	Arts	Tamil Nadu
1971		P Tiruvillvamalai Seshan M. Iyer	Arts	Tamil Nadu
1971		Jainendra Kumar Jain	Literature & Education	Delhi
1971		Mungtu Ram Jaipuria	Social Work	Delhi
1971		Veni Shankar Jha	Literature & Education	Madhya Pradesh
1971		Raj Kapoor	Arts	Punjab
1971		A. Vithal alias Dhananjay Keer	Literature & Education	Maharashtra
1971		Amir Khan	Arts	Maharashtra
1971		Nissar Hussain Khan	Arts	Uttar Pradesh
1971		P. Kalathil Kunju Kurup	Arts	Kerala
1971		R. K. Laxman	Arts	Maharashtra
1971		Shantilal Jamnadas Mehta	Medicine	Maharashtra
1971		Ved Rattan Mohan	Trade & Industry	Uttar Pradesh
1971		Kedar Nath Mookerjee	Trade & Industry	West Bengal
1971		Santosh Kumar Mukerji	Medicine	Madhya Pradesh
1971		Bishnupada Mukhopadhyaya	Medicine	Bihar
1971		Kalindi Charan Panigrahi	Literature & Education	Odisha
1971		Manibhai J. Patel	Trade & Industry	Madhya Pradesh
1971		D. K. Pattammal	Arts	Tamil Nadu
1971		Krishnarao Phulambrikar	Arts	Maharashtra
1971		Venkatarama Ramalingam Pillai	Literature & Education	Tamil Nadu
1971		Vulimiri Ramalingaswami	Medicine	Tamil Nadu
1971		Suresh Chandra Roy	Trade & Industry	West Bengal
1971		Pandurang Vasudeo Sukhatme	Science & Engineering	Italy
1971		Pichu Sambamoorthi	Arts	Tamil Nadu
1971		Devchand Chhaganlal Shah	Social Work	Maharashtra
1971		Madan Mohan Singh	Medicine	Delhi
1971		Bhagwati Charan Verma	Literature & Education	Uttar Pradesh
1971		Parmeshwari Lal Verma	Civil Service	Chandigarh
1971		Kasturi Lal Vij	Civil Service	Delhi
1972		Jagjit Singh Aurora	Civil Service	Delhi
1972		Madhavrao Bagal	Social Work	Maharashtra
1972		Surinder Singh Bedi	Civil Service	Delhi
1972		Gopal Gurunath Bewoor	Civil Service	Karnataka
1972		Gulestan Rustom Billimoria	Social Work	Maharashtra
1972		Kunhiraman Palat Candeth	Civil Service	Delhi
1972		Ram Narayan Chakravarti	Science & Engineering	West Bengal
1972		Pran Nath Chhutani	Literature & Education	Chandigarh
1972		Yashodhara Dasappa	Social Work	Karnataka
1972		Maheshwar Dayal	Social Work	Delhi
1972		Hari Chand Dewan	Civil Service	Punjab
1972		Minoo Merwan Engineer	Civil Service	Gujarat
1972		Benoy Bhushan Ghosh	Civil Service	West Bengal
1972		Inderjit Singh Gill	Civil Service	Maharashtra
1972		Mohd. Hayath	Civil Service	Karnataka
1972		Lakhumal Hiranand Hiranandani	Medicine	Maharashtra
1972		L. A. Krishna Iyer	Science & Engineering	Kerala
1972		Sourendra Nath Kohli	Civil Service	Punjab
1972		Jai Krishna	Civil Service	Uttar Pradesh
1972		Nilakanta Krishnan	Civil Service	Tamil Nadu
1972		Ashwini Kumar	Civil Service	Punjab
1972		Pran Nath Luthra	Civil Service	Punjab
1972		Amrut V. Mody	Civil Service	Maharashtra
1972		N. G. Krishna Murti	Civil Service	Delhi
1972		T. A. Pai	Civil Service	Karnataka
1972		Vinayakrao Patwardhan	Arts	Maharashtra
1972		Dattatraya Yeshwant Phadke	Science & Engineering	Maharashtra
1972		Kayalath Pothen Philip	Literature & Education	Maharashtra
1972		Bhalchandra Nilkanth Purandare	Medicine	Maharashtra
1972		Tapishwar Narain Raina	Civil Service	Jammu & Kashmir
1972		Bharat Ram	Trade & Industry	Delhi
1972		Mohinder Singh Randhawa	Science & Engineering	Punjab
1972		Adya Rangacharya	Literature & Education	Karnataka
1972		M. B. Ramachandra Rao	Science & Engineering	Delhi
1972		Ayyagari Sambasiva Rao	Science & Engineering	Andhra Pradesh
1972		Sujoy B. Roy	Medicine	West Bengal
1972		Khusro Faramurz Rustamji	Civil Service	Madhya Pradesh
1972		Sirtaj Singh Sahi	Civil Service	Chandigarh
1972		Shantilal C. Sheth	Medicine	Maharashtra
1972		Baldev Singh	Medicine	Delhi
1972		Khem Karan Singh	Civil Service	Punjab
1972		Sartaj Singh	Civil Service	Punjab
1972		Sagat Singh	Civil Service	Punjab
1972		Birendranath Sircar	Arts	Bihar
1972		Papanasam Sivan	Arts	Tamil Nadu
1972		Chandrika Prasad Srivastava	Civil Service	United Kingdom
1972		M. S. Swaminathan	Science & Engineering	Tamil Nadu
1972		Krishnaswami Swaminathan	Literature & Education	Delhi
1972		Bal Dattatreya Tilak	Science & Engineering	Maharashtra
1972		Syed Husain Zaheer	Trade & Industry	Andhra Pradesh
1973		Om P. Bahl	Science & Engineering	United States
1973		C. Vaidyanatha Bhagavathar	Arts	Kerala
1973		Gosasp Maneckji Sorabji Captain	Social Work	Maharashtra
1973		Harindranath Chattopadhyay	Literature & Education	Andhra Pradesh
1973		Banarsidas Chaturvedi	Literature & Education	Uttar Pradesh
1973		M. A. Muthiah Chettiar	Trade & Industry	Tamil Nadu
1973		M. F. Husain	Arts	Delhi
1973		Pothan Joseph (Note: Pothan Joseph died on 2 November 1972, at the age of 80.)#	Literature & Education	Kerala
1973		N. R. Malkani	Social Work	Rajasthan
1973		Vinoo Mankad	Sports	Gujarat
1973		Sudhir Krishna Mukherjee	Civil Service	West Bengal
1973		Ramakant Maheshwar Muzumdar	Civil Service	Karnataka
1973		Krishnarao Shankar Pandit	Arts	Madhya Pradesh
1973		Pitambar Pant	Civil Service	Uttar Pradesh
1973		Vennelakanti Raghavaiah	Social Work	Andhra Pradesh
1973		Raja Ramanna	Science & Engineering	Tamil Nadu
1973		K. Sukumaran	Literature & Education	Kerala
1974		Alice Boner	Arts	Italy
1974		Camille Bulcke	Literature & Education	Belgium
1974		Ram Kumar Caroli	Medicine	Uttar Pradesh
1974		Moti Chandra	Science & Engineering	Maharashtra
1974		Dhirendra Nath Ganguly	Arts	West Bengal
1974		D. V. Gundappa	Literature & Education	Karnataka
1974		Vasant Shankar Huzurbazar	Literature & Education	Maharashtra
1974		Chintamoni Kar	Arts	West Bengal
1974		Mogubai Kurdikar	Arts	Maharashtra
1974		Jayant Pandurang Naik	Literature & Education	Maharashtra
1974		Habib Rahman	Science & Engineering	Delhi
1974		B. N. Reddy	Arts	Andhra Pradesh
1974		John Richardson	Social Work	Andaman & Nicobar Islands
1974		Toppur Seethapathy Sadasivan	Science & Engineering	Tamil Nadu
1974		Sukhlal Sanghvi	Literature & Education	Gujarat
1974		Hasmukh Dhirajlal Sankalia	Civil Service	Maharashtra
1974		Bhupati Mohan Sen	Literature & Education	West Bengal
1974		Thakur Jaideva Singh	Science & Engineering	Uttar Pradesh
1974		Khushwant Singh	Literature & Education	Punjab
1974		Arunachala Sreenivasan	Science & Engineering	Karnataka
1974		Raman Viswanathan	Medicine	Tamil Nadu
1975		Begum Akhtar (Note: Begum Akhtar died on 30 October 1974, at the age of 60.)#	Arts	Uttar Pradesh
1975		Dilbagh Singh Athwal	Science & Engineering	United States
1975		Asima Chatterjee	Science & Engineering	West Bengal
1975		Madhav Sadashiv Gore	Science & Engineering	Maharashtra
1975		Pratul Chandra Gupta	Literature & Education	West Bengal
1975		P. Krishnagopala Iyengar	Science & Engineering	Maharashtra
1975		Darab Jehangir Jussawala	Medicine	Maharashtra
1975		Raj Kumar Khanna	Civil Service	Delhi
1975		Pancheti Koteswaram	Civil Service	Tamil Nadu
1975		Vasudev Vishnu Mirashi	Literature & Education	Maharashtra
1975		Balai Chand Mukhopadhyay	Literature & Education	Bihar
1975		Kirpal Singh Narang	Literature & Education	Punjab
1975		P. Ardeshir Narielwala	Trade & Industry	Maharashtra
1975		Ronald Carlton Vivian Piadade Noronha	Civil Service	Madhya Pradesh
1975		Ratan Shastri	Social Work	Rajasthan
1976		Malcolm Adiseshiah	Civil Service	Tamil Nadu
1976		Harivansh Rai Bachchan	Literature & Education	Maharashtra
1976		Nabakanta Barua	Literature & Education	Assam
1976		Naoroji Pirojsha Godrej	Trade & Industry	Maharashtra
1976		Laxmanshastri Balaji Joshi	Literature & Education	Maharashtra
1976		Zehra Ali Yavar Jung	Social Work	Andhra Pradesh
1976		Mallikarjun Mansur	Arts	Karnataka
1976		Shri Ram Mehta	Civil Service	Delhi
1976		Yash Pal	Science & Engineering	Punjab
1976		Bhogilal Pandya	Social Work	Rajasthan
1976		Udupi Ramachandra Rao	Science & Engineering	Karnataka
1976		Krishnaswami Srinivas Sanjivi	Medicine	Tamil Nadu
1976		Devulapalli Krishnasastri	Literature & Education	Andhra Pradesh
1976		Devendra Sen	Civil Service	West Bengal
1976		Calambur Sivaramamurti	Civil Service	Delhi
1976		E. C. George Sudarshan	Literature & Education	United States
1977		Gopinath Aman	Literature & Education	Delhi
1977		Prithvi Singh Azad	Public Affairs	Chandigarh
1977		Harish Chandra	Literature & Education	United States
1977		Kumar Gandharva	Arts	Madhya Pradesh
1977		Phulrenu Guha	Social Work	West Bengal
1977		Jagmohan	Civil Service	Delhi
1977		Kailas Nath Kaul	Literature & Education	Uttar Pradesh
1977		Yousuf Hussain Khan	Literature & Education	Delhi
1977		Chackachanveedu Krishnan Nair	Social Work	Delhi
1977		K. S. Narayanaswamy	Arts	Maharashtra
1977		Paramsukh J. Pandya	Arts	Maharashtra
1977		Balasubramaniam Ramamurthi	Medicine	Tamil Nadu
1977		Perugu Siva Reddy	Medicine	Andhra Pradesh
1977		Annapurna Ravi Shankar	Arts	Uttar Pradesh
1977		Yudhvir Singh	Social Work	Delhi
1977		Mysore Narasimhachar Srinivas	Science & Engineering	Karnataka
1977		T. P. Meenakshisundaram	Literature & Education	Tamil Nadu

== Explanatory notes ==
Non-citizen recipients

Posthumous recipients
