= Annasaheb =

Annasaheb is a given name. Notable people with the name include:

- Ganpatrao Annasaheb Deshmukh (1927–2021), Indian politician
- Annasaheb Jolle (born 1963), Indian politician and Member of Parliament
- Shashikala Annasaheb Jolle (born 1969), Indian social worker and politician
- Annasaheb Kirloskar (1843–1885), Marathi playwright from Maharashtra, India
- Annasaheb Magar, the former MP of 6th Lok Sabha
- Annasaheb M. K. Patil (born 1939), Indian politician and member of parliament
- Annasaheb Sahasrabuddhe, Indian independence activist, Gandhian, social worker
- Annasaheb Shinde (1922–1993), member of 3rd and 4th Lok Sabha from Kopargaon
- C. Ramchandra (1918-1982), Indian playback singer and music composer, also known by the pseudonym "Annasaheb"

== See also ==
- Annasaheb Dange College of Engineering & Technology, Ashta, Maharashtra
- Annasaheb Chudaman Patil Memorial Medical College, Maharashtra
- Annasaheb Magar PCMC Stadium, multi purposed stadium in the city of Pune, India
