= Civil engineering =

Engineering discipline focused on physical infrastructure

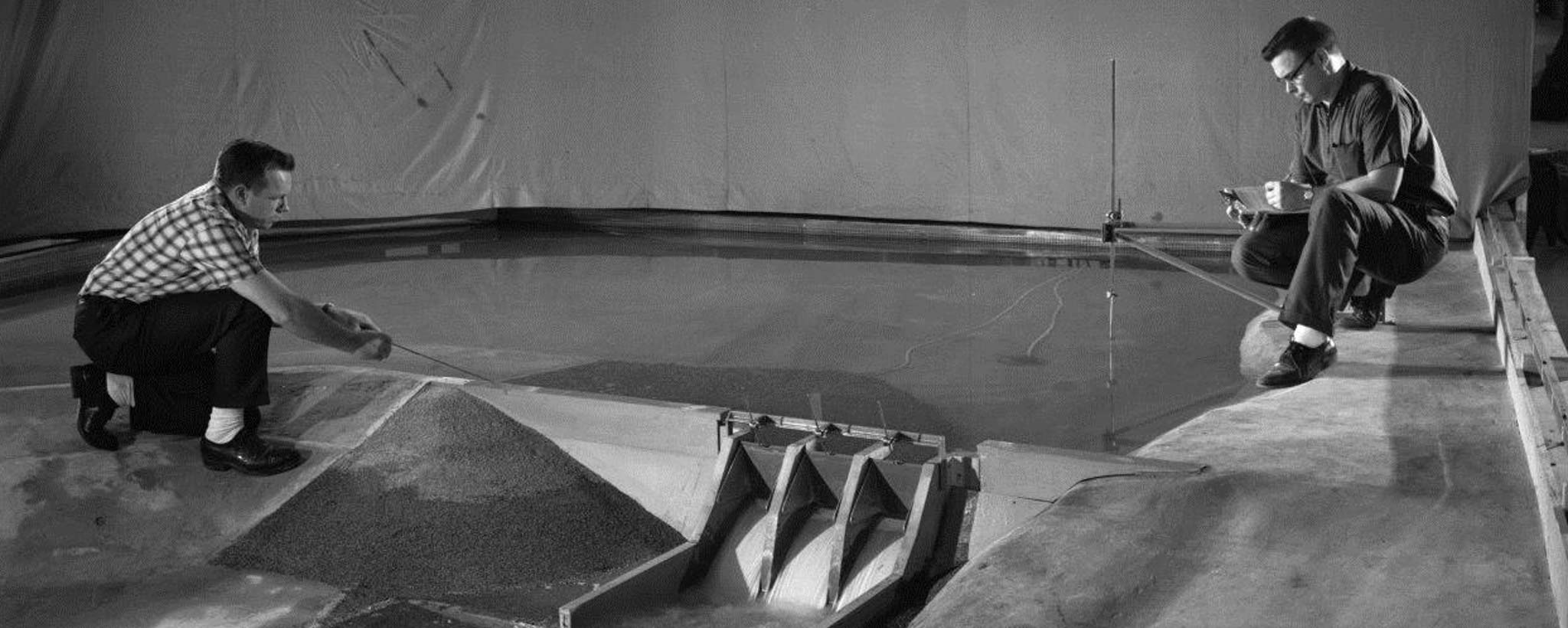
Tennessee Valley Authority civil engineers monitoring hydraulics of a scale model of Tellico Dam

Civil engineering is a professional engineering discipline that deals with the design, construction, and maintenance of the physical and naturally built environment, including public works such as roads, bridges, canals, dams, airports, sewage systems, pipelines, structural components of buildings, and railways.

Civil engineering is traditionally broken into a number of sub-disciplines. It is considered the second-oldest engineering discipline after military engineering, and it is defined to distinguish non-military engineering from military engineering. Civil engineering can take place in the public sector from municipal public works departments through to national government agencies, and in the private sector from locally based firms to Fortune Global 500 companies.

== History ==
=== As a discipline ===
Civil engineering is the application of physical and scientific principles for solving the problems of society, and its history is intricately linked to advances in the understanding of physics and mathematics throughout history. Because civil engineering is a broad profession, including several specialized sub-disciplines, its history is linked to knowledge of structures, materials science, geography, geology, soils, hydrology, environmental science, mechanics, project management, and other fields.

Throughout ancient and medieval history most architectural design and construction was carried out by artisans, such as stonemasons and carpenters, rising to the role of master builder. Knowledge was retained in craft guilds and seldom supplanted by advances. Structures, roads, and infrastructure that existed were repetitive, and increases in scale were incremental.

One of the earliest examples of a scientific approach to physical and mathematical problems applicable to civil engineering is the work of Archimedes in the 3rd century BC, including Archimedes' principle, which underpins our understanding of buoyancy, and practical solutions such as Archimedes' screw. Brahmagupta, an Indian mathematician, used arithmetic in the 7th century AD, based on Hindu-Arabic numerals, for excavation (volume) computations.

=== As a profession ===
Engineering has been an aspect of life since the beginnings of human existence. The earliest practice of civil engineering may have commenced between 4000 and 2000 BC in ancient Egypt, the Indus Valley civilization, and Mesopotamia (ancient Iraq) when humans started to abandon a nomadic existence, creating a need for the construction of shelter. During this time, transportation became increasingly important leading to the development of the wheel and sailing.

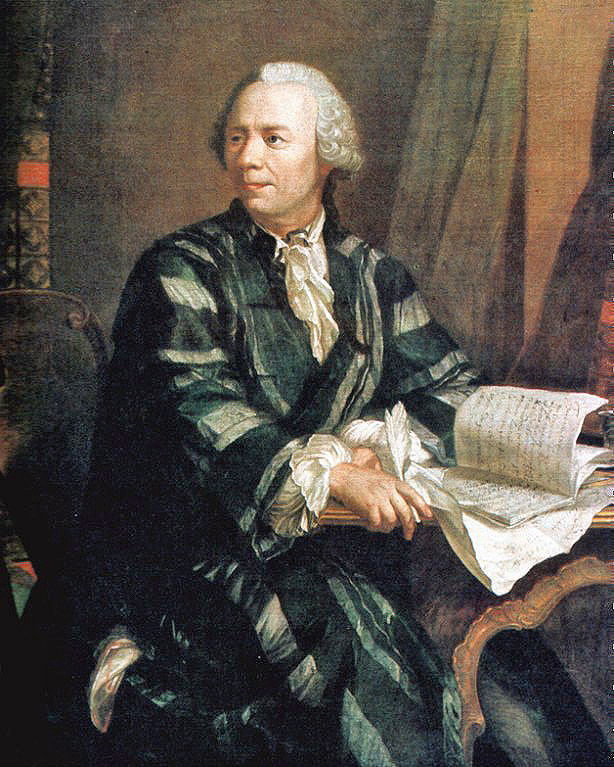
Leonhard Euler developed the theory explaining the buckling of columns.

Until modern times there was no clear distinction between civil engineering and architecture, and the terms engineer and architect were mainly geographical variations referring to the same occupation, and often used interchangeably. The constructions of pyramids in Egypt (c. 2700–2500 BC) constitute some of the first instances of large structure constructions in history. Other ancient historic civil engineering constructions include the Qanat water management system in modern-day Iran (the oldest is older than 3000 years and longer than 71 kilometres (44 mi)), the Parthenon by Iktinos in Ancient Greece (447–438 BC), the Appian Way by Roman engineers (c. 312 BC), the Great Wall of China by General Meng T'ien under orders from Ch'in Emperor Shih Huang Ti (c. 220 BC) and the stupas constructed in ancient Sri Lanka like the Jetavanaramaya and the extensive irrigation works in Anuradhapura. The Romans developed civil structures throughout their empire, including especially aqueducts, insulae, harbors, bridges, dams and roads.

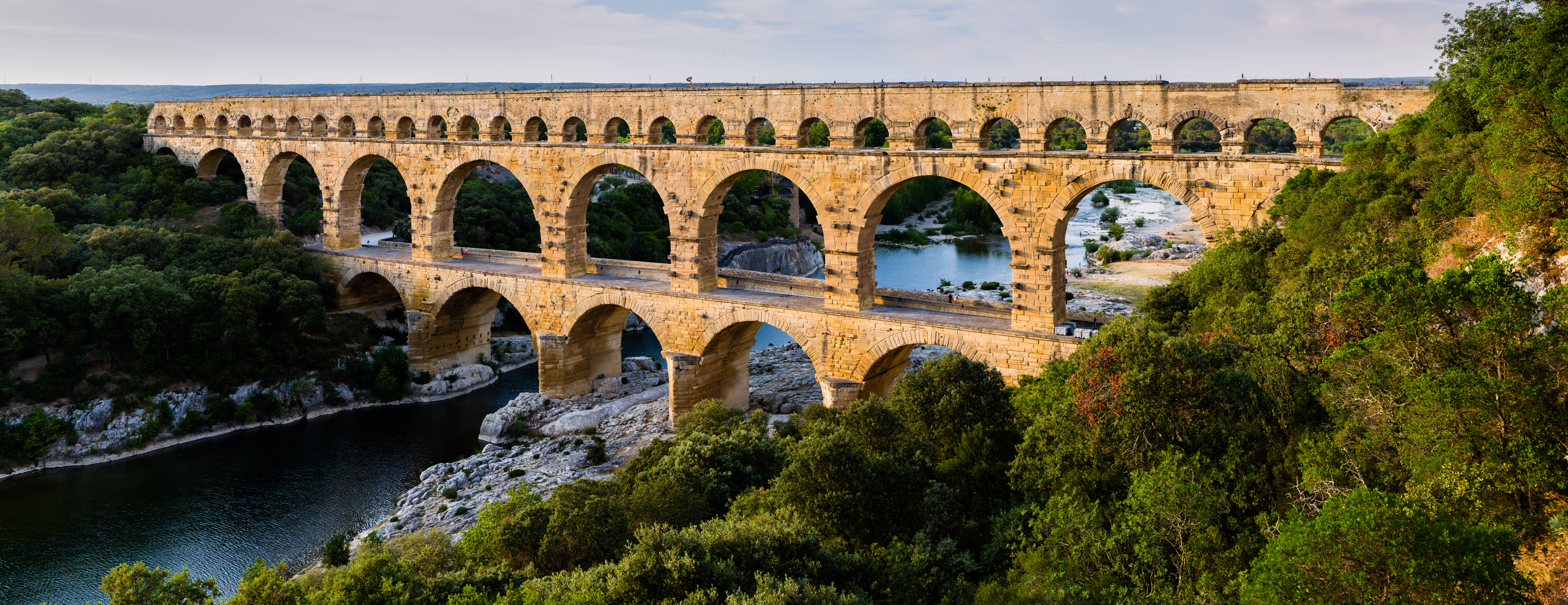
A Roman aqueduct [built c. 19 BC], Pont du Gard, France

Chichen Itza was a large pre-Columbian city in Mexico built by the Maya people of the Post Classic. The northeast column temple also covers a channel that funnels all the rainwater from the complex some 40 metres (130 ft) away to a rejollada, a former cenote.

In the 18th century, the term civil engineering was coined to incorporate all things civilian as opposed to military engineering. In 1747, the first institution for the teaching of civil engineering, the École Nationale des Ponts et Chaussées, was established in France; and more examples followed in other European countries, like Spain (Escuela Técnica Superior de Ingenieros de Caminos, Canales y Puertos). The first self-proclaimed civil engineer was John Smeaton, who constructed the Eddystone Lighthouse. In 1771 Smeaton and some of his colleagues formed the Smeatonian Society of Civil Engineers, a group of leaders of the profession who met informally over dinner. Though there was evidence of some technical meetings, it was little more than a social society.

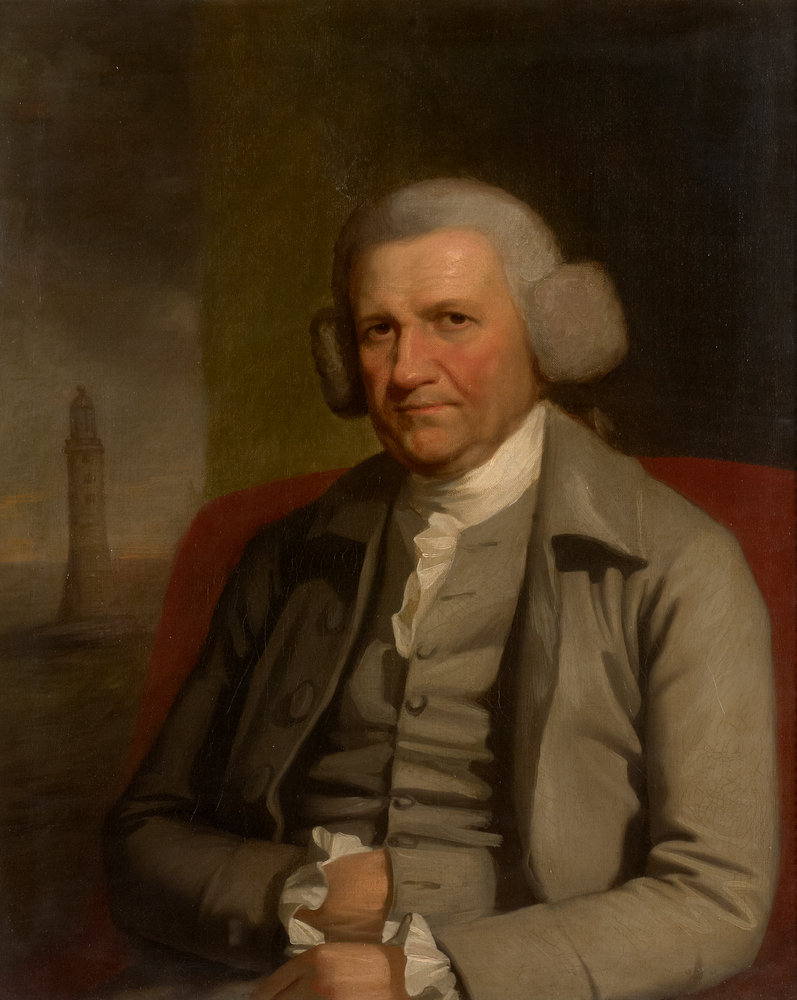
John Smeaton, the "father of civil engineering"

In 1818 the Institution of Civil Engineers was founded in London, and in 1820 the eminent engineer Thomas Telford became its first president. The institution received a Royal Charter in 1828, formally recognising civil engineering as a profession. Its charter defined civil engineering as:

the art of directing the great sources of power in nature for the use and convenience of man, as the means of production and of traffic in states, both for external and internal trade, as applied in the construction of roads, bridges, aqueducts, canals, river navigation and docks for internal intercourse and exchange, and in the construction of ports, harbours, moles, breakwaters and lighthouses, and in the art of navigation by artificial power for the purposes of commerce, and in the construction and application of machinery, and in the drainage of cities and towns.

=== Education ===
The first private college to teach civil engineering in the United States was Norwich University, founded in 1819 by Captain Alden Partridge. The first degree in civil engineering in the United States was awarded by Rensselaer Polytechnic Institute in 1835. The first such degree to be awarded to a woman was granted by Cornell University to Nora Stanton Blatch in 1905.

In the UK during the early 19th century, the division between civil engineering and military engineering (served by the Royal Military Academy, Woolwich), coupled with the demands of the Industrial Revolution, spawned new engineering education initiatives: the Class of Civil Engineering and Mining was founded at King's College London in 1838, mainly as a response to the growth of the railway system and the need for more qualified engineers; the private College for Civil Engineers in Putney was established in 1839, and the UK's first Chair of Engineering was established at the University of Glasgow in 1840.

== Education ==
Civil engineers typically possess an academic degree in civil engineering. The length of study is three to five years, and the completed degree is designated as a bachelor of technology, or a bachelor of engineering. The curriculum generally includes classes in physics, mathematics, project management, design and specific topics in civil engineering. After taking basic courses in most sub-disciplines of civil engineering, they move on to specialize in one or more sub-disciplines at advanced levels. While an undergraduate degree (BEng/BSc) normally provides successful students with industry-accredited qualifications, some academic institutions offer post-graduate degrees (MEng/MSc), which allow students to further specialize in their particular area of interest.

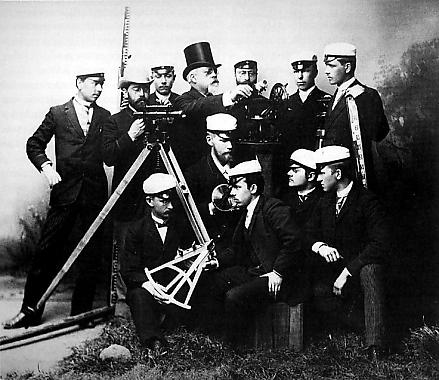
Surveying students with professor at the Helsinki University of Technology in the late 19th century.

== Practicing engineers ==
In most countries, a bachelor's degree in engineering represents the first step towards professional certification, and a professional body certifies the degree program. After completing a certified degree program, the engineer must satisfy a range of requirements including work experience and exam requirements before being certified. Once certified, the engineer is designated as a professional engineer (in the United States, Canada and South Africa), a chartered engineer (in most Commonwealth countries), a chartered professional engineer (in Australia and New Zealand), or a European engineer (in most countries of the European Union). There are international agreements between relevant professional bodies to allow engineers to practice across national borders.

The benefits of certification vary depending upon location. For example, in the United States and Canada, "only a licensed professional engineer may prepare, sign and seal, and submit engineering plans and drawings to a public authority for approval, or seal engineering work for public and private clients." This requirement is enforced under provincial law such as the Engineers Act in Quebec. No such legislation has been enacted in other countries including the United Kingdom. In Australia, state licensing of engineers is limited to the state of Queensland. Almost all certifying bodies maintain a code of ethics which all members must abide by.

Engineers must obey contract law in their contractual relationships with other parties. In cases where an engineer's work fails, they may be subject to the law of tort of negligence, and in extreme cases, criminal charges. An engineer's work must also comply with numerous other rules and regulations such as building codes and environmental law.

== Sub-disciplines ==
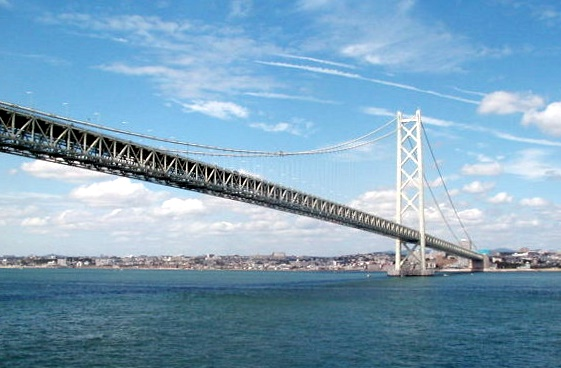
The Akashi Kaikyō Bridge in Japan, currently the world's second-longest suspension span.

There are a number of sub-disciplines within the broad field of civil engineering. General civil engineers work closely with surveyors and specialized civil engineers to design grading, drainage, pavement, water supply, sewer service, dams, electric and communications supply. General civil engineering is also referred to as site engineering, a branch of civil engineering that primarily focuses on converting a tract of land from one usage to another. Site engineers spend time visiting project sites, meeting with stakeholders, and preparing construction plans. Civil engineers apply the principles of geotechnical engineering, structural engineering, environmental engineering, transportation engineering and construction engineering to residential, commercial, industrial and public works projects of all sizes and levels of construction.

=== Coastal engineering ===
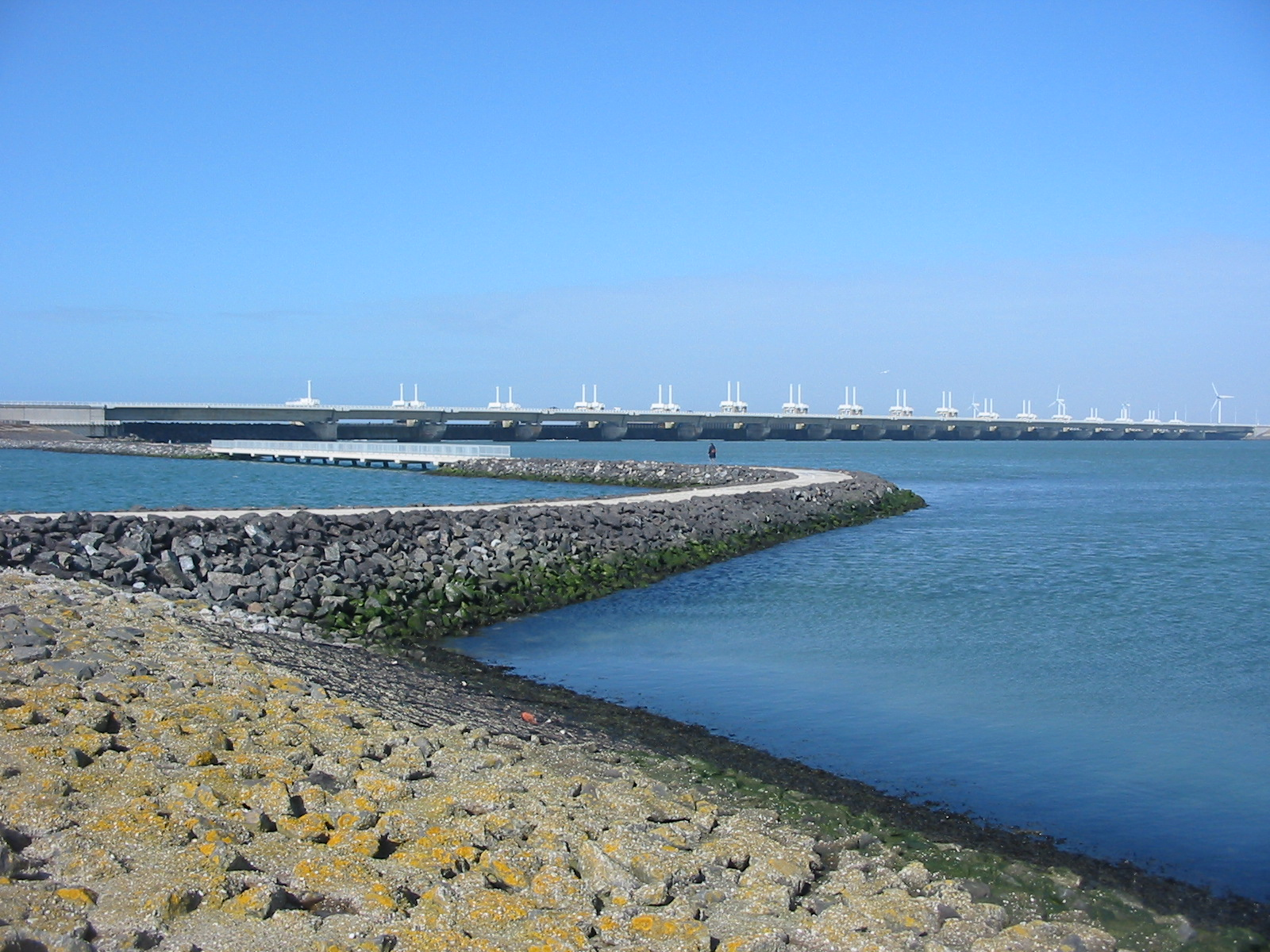
Oosterscheldekering, a storm surge barrier in the Netherlands.

Coastal engineering is concerned with managing coastal areas. In some jurisdictions, the terms sea defense and coastal protection mean defense against flooding and erosion, respectively. Coastal defense is the more traditional term, but coastal management has become popular as well.

=== Construction engineering ===
Construction engineering involves planning and execution, transportation of materials, and site development based on hydraulic, environmental, structural, and geotechnical engineering. As construction firms tend to have higher business risk than other types of civil engineering firms, construction engineers often engage in more business-like transactions, such as drafting and reviewing contracts, analyze and evaluating logistical operations, and monitoring supply prices.

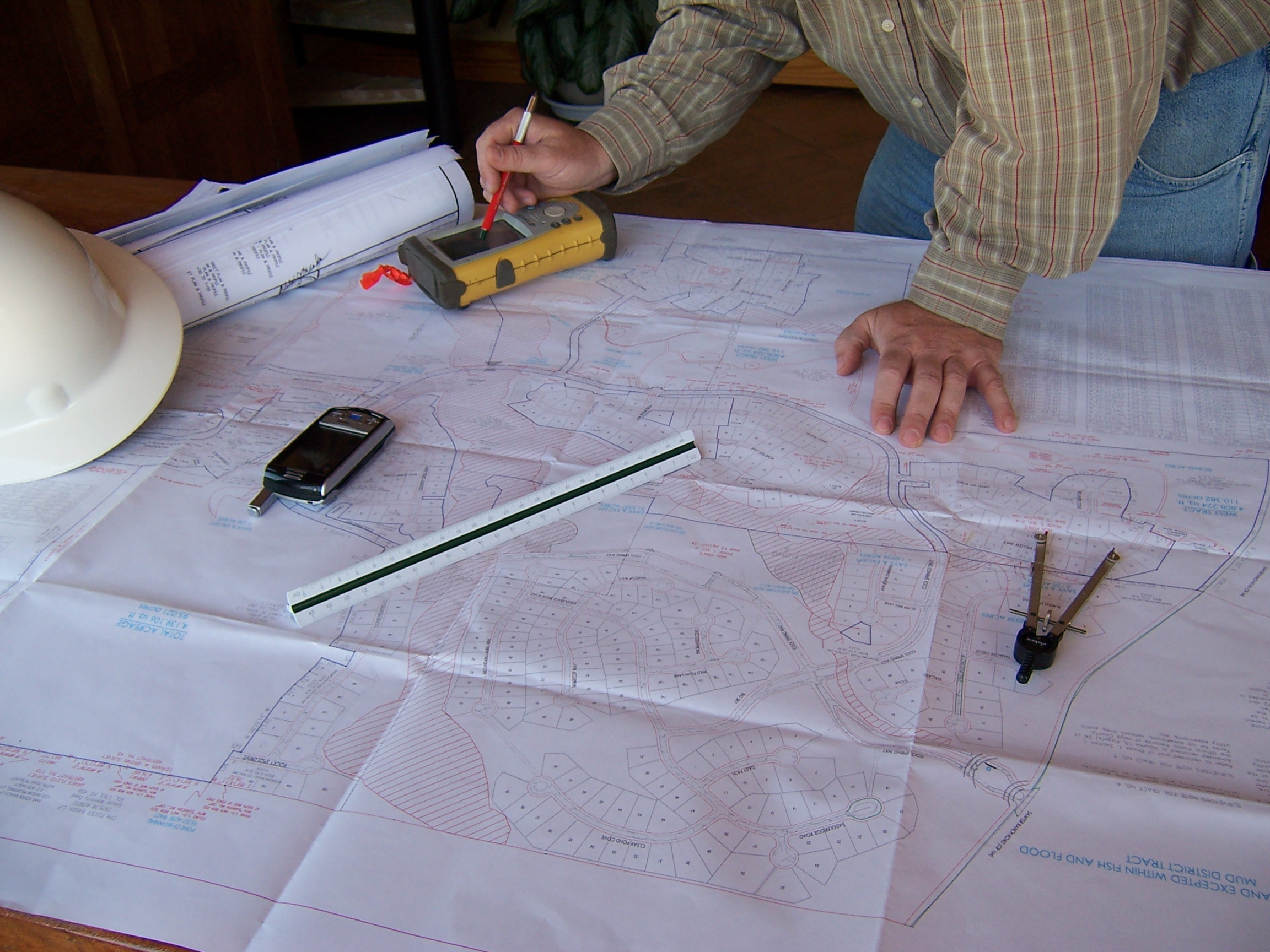
Image shows civil engineers working/planning on a site

=== Earthquake engineering ===
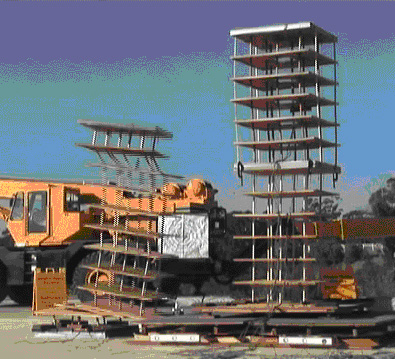
Earthquake Crash Testing, performed by engineers to determine the liability of structures

Earthquake engineering involves designing structures to withstand hazardous earthquake exposures. Earthquake engineering is a sub-discipline of structural engineering. The main objectives of earthquake engineering are to understand interaction of structures on the shaky ground; foresee the consequences of possible earthquakes; and design, construct and maintain structures to perform at earthquake in compliance with building codes.

=== Environmental engineering ===
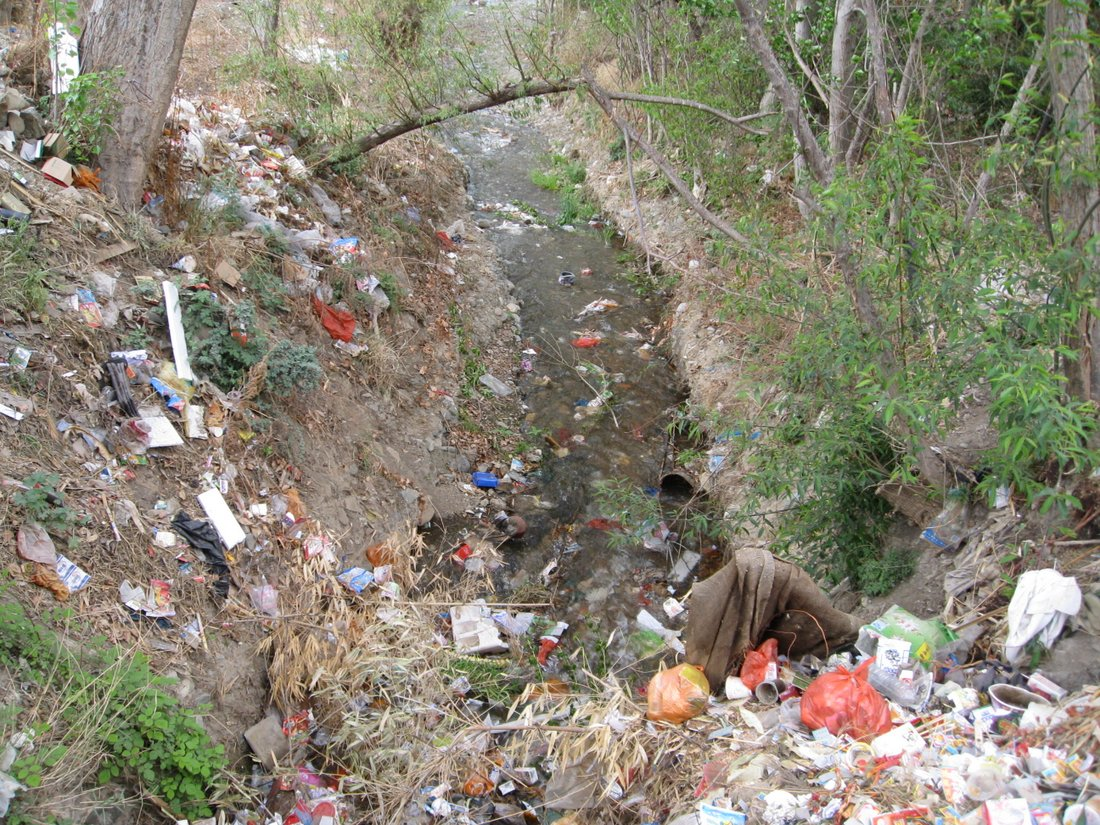
Creek contaminated with water pollution

Environmental engineering is the contemporary term for sanitary engineering, though sanitary engineering traditionally had not included much of the hazardous waste management and environmental remediation work covered by environmental engineering. Public health engineering and environmental health engineering are other terms being used.

Environmental engineering deals with treatment of chemical, biological, or thermal wastes, purification of water and air, and remediation of contaminated sites after waste disposal or accidental contamination. Among the topics covered by environmental engineering are pollutant transport, water purification, waste water treatment, air pollution, solid waste treatment, recycling, and hazardous waste management. Environmental engineers administer pollution reduction, green engineering, and industrial ecology. Environmental engineers also compile information on environmental consequences of proposed actions.

=== Forensic engineering ===
Forensic engineering is the investigation of materials, products, structures or components that fail or do not operate or function as intended, causing personal injury or damage to property. The consequences of failure are dealt with by the law of product liability. The field also deals with retracing processes and procedures leading to accidents in operation of vehicles or machinery. The subject is applied most commonly in civil law cases, although it may be of use in criminal law cases. Generally the purpose of a Forensic engineering investigation is to locate cause or causes of failure with a view to improve performance or life of a component, or to assist a court in determining the facts of an accident. It can also involve investigation of intellectual property claims, especially patents.

=== Geotechnical engineering ===
A phase diagram of soil indicating the weights and volumes of air, soil, water, and voids.

Geotechnical engineering studies rock and soil supporting civil engineering systems. Knowledge from the field of soil science, materials science, mechanics, and hydraulics is applied to safely and economically design foundations, retaining walls, and other structures. Environmental efforts to protect groundwater and safely maintain landfills have spawned a new area of research called geo-environmental engineering.

Identification of soil properties presents challenges to geotechnical engineers. Boundary conditions are often well defined in other branches of civil engineering, but unlike steel or concrete, the material properties and behavior of soil are difficult to predict due to its variability and limitation on investigation. Furthermore, soil exhibits nonlinear (stress-dependent) strength, stiffness, and dilatancy (volume change associated with application of shear stress), making studying soil mechanics all the more difficult. Geotechnical engineers frequently work with professional geologists, Geological Engineering professionals and soil scientists.

=== Materials science and engineering ===
Materials science is closely related to civil engineering. It studies fundamental characteristics of materials, and deals with ceramics such as concrete and mix asphalt concrete, strong metals such as aluminum and steel, and thermosetting polymers including polymethylmethacrylate (PMMA) and carbon fibers.

Materials engineering involves protection and prevention (paints and finishes). Alloying combines two types of metals to produce another metal with desired properties. It incorporates elements of applied physics and chemistry. With recent media attention on nanoscience and nanotechnology, materials engineering has been at the forefront of academic research. It is also an important part of forensic engineering and failure analysis.

=== Site development and planning ===
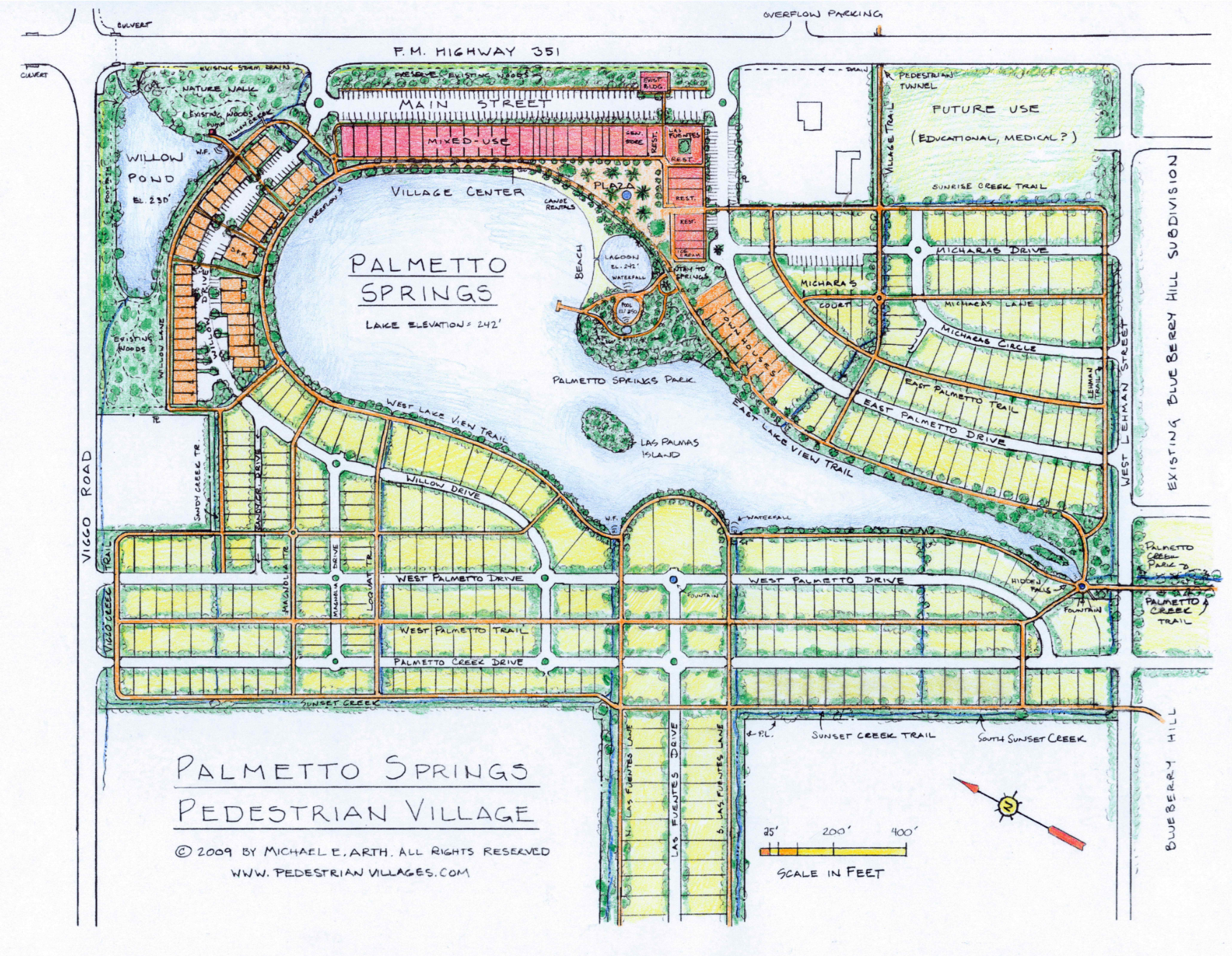
Plan draft of proposed mixed-use site

Site development, also known as site planning, is focused on the planning and development potential of a site as well as addressing possible impacts from permitting issues and environmental challenges.

=== Structural engineering ===
Burj Khalifa animation of construction process

Shallow foundation construction example

Structural engineering is concerned with the structural design and structural analysis of buildings, bridges, towers, flyovers (overpasses), tunnels, off shore structures like oil and gas fields in the sea, aerostructure and other structures. This involves identifying the loads which act upon a structure and the forces and stresses which arise within that structure due to those loads, and then designing the structure to successfully support and resist those loads. The loads can be self weight of the structures, other dead load, live loads, moving (wheel) load, wind load, earthquake load, load from temperature change etc. The structural engineer must design structures to be safe for their users and to successfully fulfill the function they are designed for (to be serviceable). Due to the nature of some loading conditions, sub-disciplines within structural engineering have emerged, including wind engineering and earthquake engineering.

Design considerations will include strength, stiffness, and stability of the structure when subjected to loads which may be static, such as furniture or self-weight, or dynamic, such as wind, seismic, crowd or vehicle loads, or transitory, such as temporary construction loads or impact. Other considerations include cost, constructibility, safety, aesthetics and sustainability.

=== Surveying ===
Surveying is the process by which a surveyor measures certain dimensions that occur on or near the surface of the Earth. Surveying equipment such as levels and theodolites are used for accurate measurement of angular deviation, horizontal, vertical and slope distances. With computerization, electronic distance measurement (EDM), total stations, GPS surveying and laser scanning have to a large extent supplanted traditional instruments. Data collected by survey measurement is converted into a graphical representation of the Earth's surface in the form of a map. This information is then used by civil engineers, contractors and realtors to design from, build on, and trade, respectively. Elements of a structure must be sized and positioned in relation to each other and to site boundaries and adjacent structures.

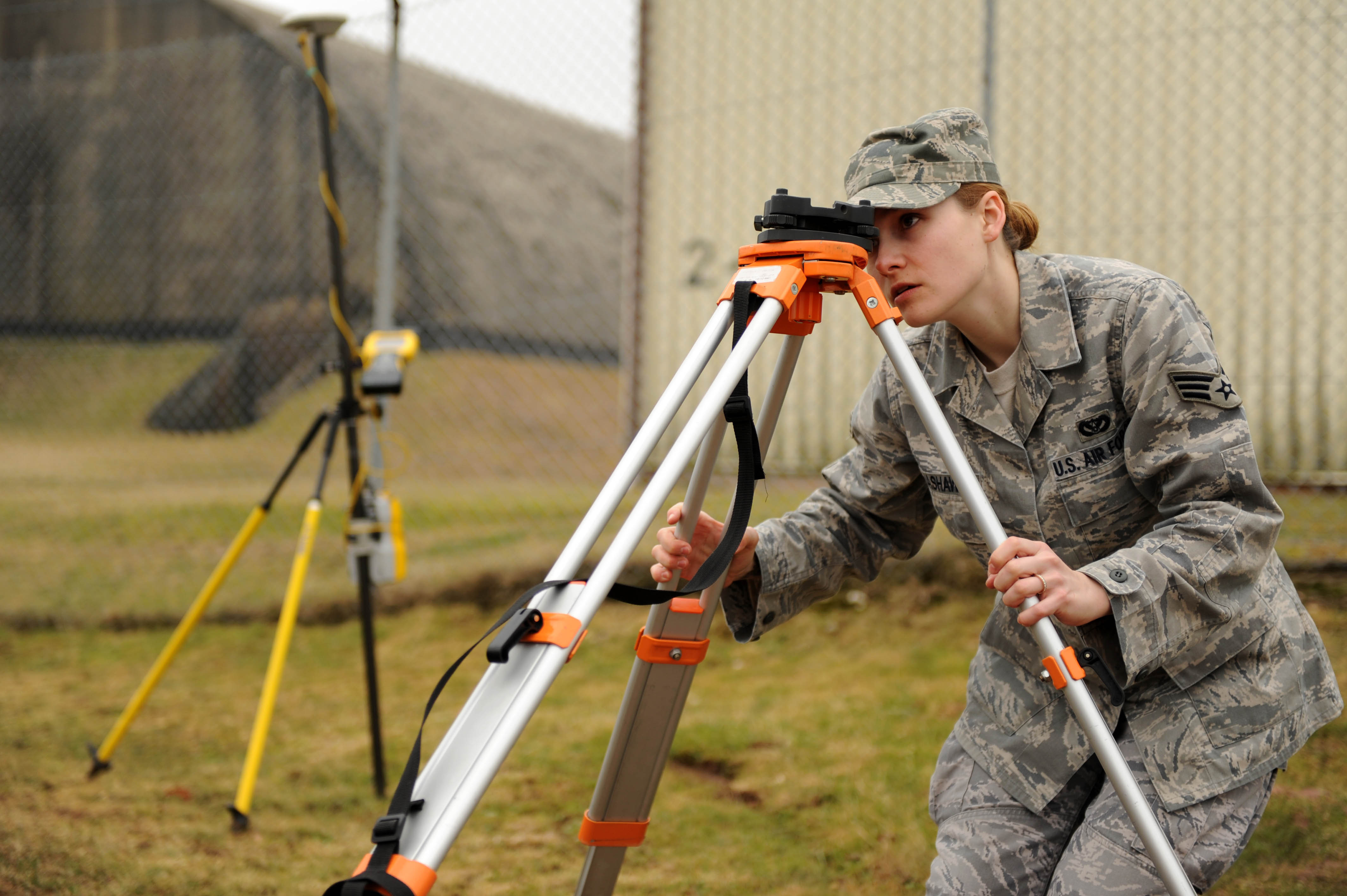
Leveling a tripod before setting EDM

Although surveying is a distinct profession with separate qualifications and licensing arrangements, civil engineers are trained in the basics of surveying and mapping, as well as geographic information systems. Surveyors also lay out the routes of railways, tramway tracks, highways, roads, pipelines and streets as well as position other infrastructure, such as harbors, before construction.

Land surveying

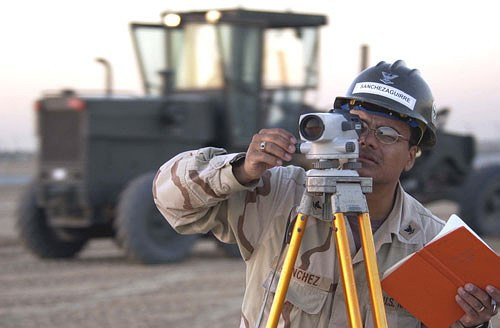
Looking through EDM

In the United States, Canada, the United Kingdom and most Commonwealth countries land surveying is considered to be a separate and distinct profession. Land surveyors are not considered to be engineers, and have their own professional associations and licensing requirements. The services of a licensed land surveyor are generally required for boundary surveys (to establish the boundaries of a parcel using its legal description) and subdivision plans (a plot or map based on a survey of a parcel of land, with boundary lines drawn inside the larger parcel to indicate the creation of new boundary lines and roads), both of which are generally referred to as Cadastral surveying. They collect data on important geological features below and on the land.

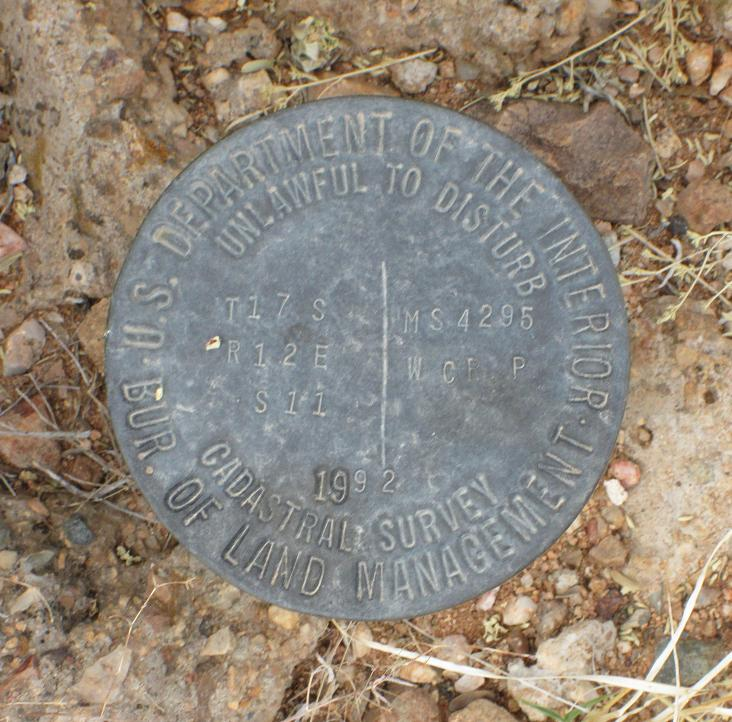
BLM cadastral survey marker from 1992 in San Xavier, Arizona.

Construction surveying

Construction surveying is generally performed by specialized technicians. Unlike land surveyors, the resulting plan does not have legal status. Construction surveyors perform the following tasks:

- Surveying existing conditions of the future work site, including topography, existing buildings and infrastructure, and underground infrastructure when possible;
- "lay-out" or "setting-out": placing reference points and markers that will guide the construction of new structures such as roads or buildings;
- Verifying the location of structures during construction;
- As-Built surveying: a survey conducted at the end of the construction project to verify that the work authorized was completed to the specifications set on plans.

=== Transportation engineering ===
Transportation engineering is concerned with moving people and goods efficiently, safely, and in a manner conducive to a vibrant community. This involves specifying, designing, constructing, and maintaining transportation infrastructure which includes streets, canals, highways, rail systems, airports, ports, and mass transit. It includes areas such as transportation design, transportation planning, traffic engineering, some aspects of urban engineering, queueing theory, pavement engineering, Intelligent Transportation System (ITS), and infrastructure management.

=== Municipal or urban engineering ===
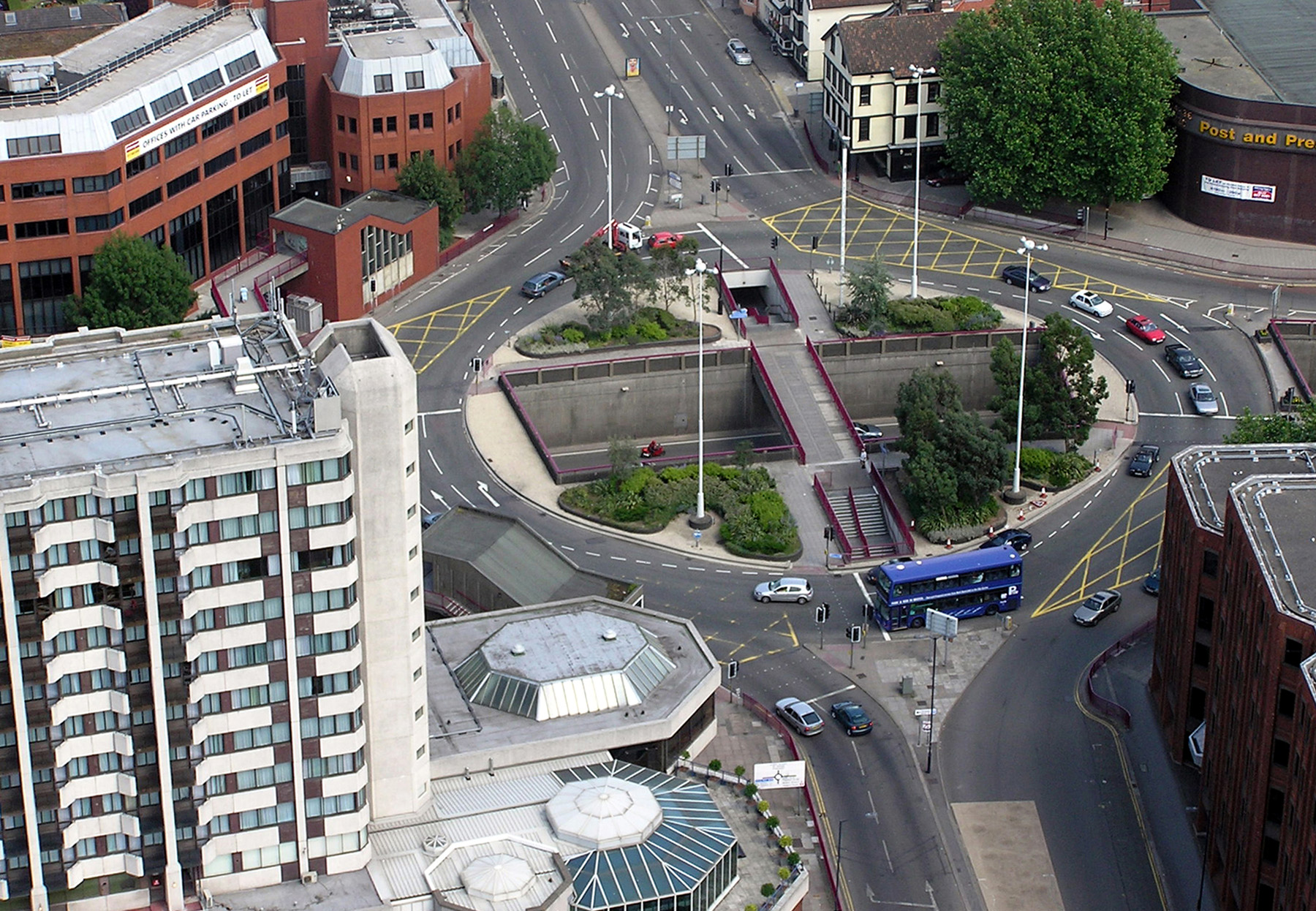
The engineering of this roundabout in Bristol, England, attempts to make traffic flow free-moving

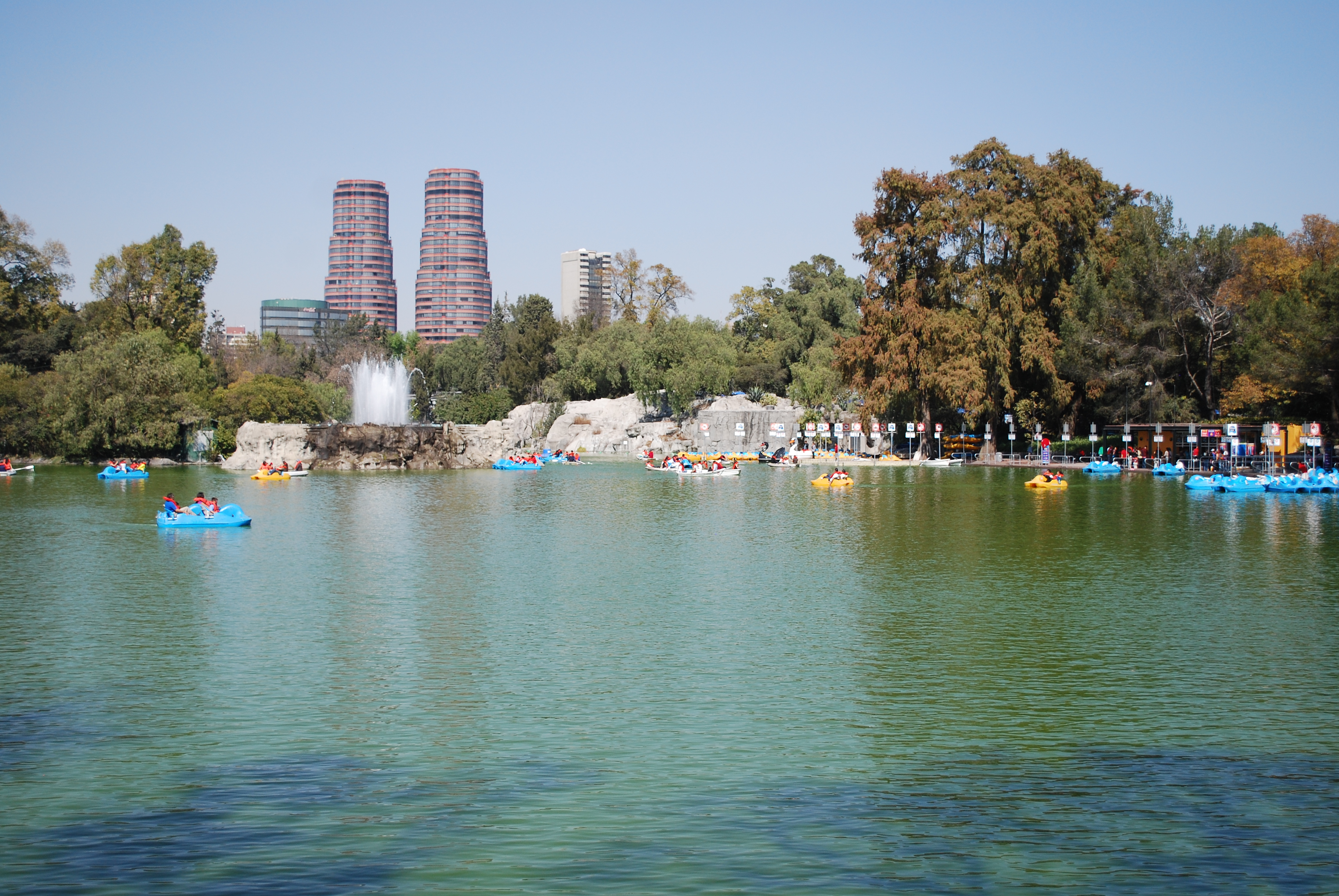
Lake Chapultepec

Municipal engineering is concerned with municipal infrastructure. This involves specifying, designing, constructing, and maintaining streets, sidewalks, water supply networks, sewers, street lighting, municipal solid waste management and disposal, storage depots for various bulk materials used for maintenance and public works (salt, sand, etc.), public parks and cycling infrastructure. In the case of underground utility networks, it may also include the civil portion (conduits and access chambers) of the local distribution networks of electrical and telecommunications services. It can also include the optimization of waste collection and bus service networks. Some of these disciplines overlap with other civil engineering specialties, however municipal engineering focuses on the coordination of these infrastructure networks and services, as they are often built simultaneously, and managed by the same municipal authority. Municipal engineers may also design the site civil works for large buildings, industrial plants or campuses (i.e. access roads, parking lots, potable water supply, treatment or pretreatment of waste water, site drainage, etc.)

=== Water resources engineering ===
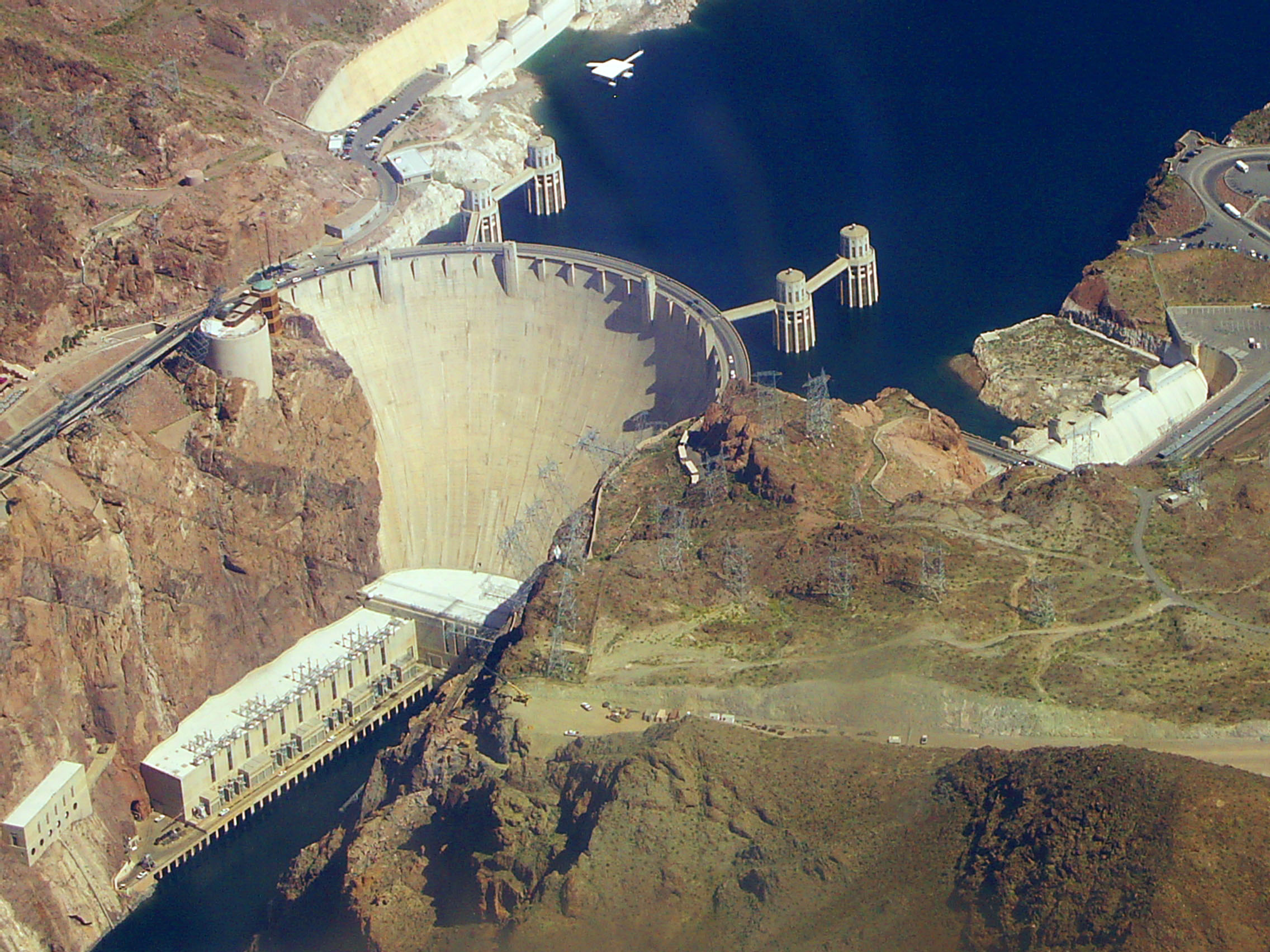
Hoover Dam

Water resources engineering is concerned with the collection and management of water (as a natural resource). As a discipline, it therefore combines elements of hydrology, environmental science, meteorology, conservation, and resource management. This area of civil engineering relates to the prediction and management of both the quality and the quantity of water in both underground (aquifers) and above ground (lakes, rivers, and streams) resources. Water resource engineers analyze and model very small to very large areas of the earth to predict the amount and content of water as it flows into, through, or out of a facility. However, the actual design of the facility may be left to other engineers.

Hydraulic engineering concerns the flow and conveyance of fluids, principally water. This area of civil engineering is intimately related to the design of pipelines, water supply network, drainage facilities (including bridges, dams, channels, culverts, levees, storm sewers), and canals. Hydraulic engineers design these facilities using the concepts of fluid pressure, fluid statics, fluid dynamics, and hydraulics, among others.

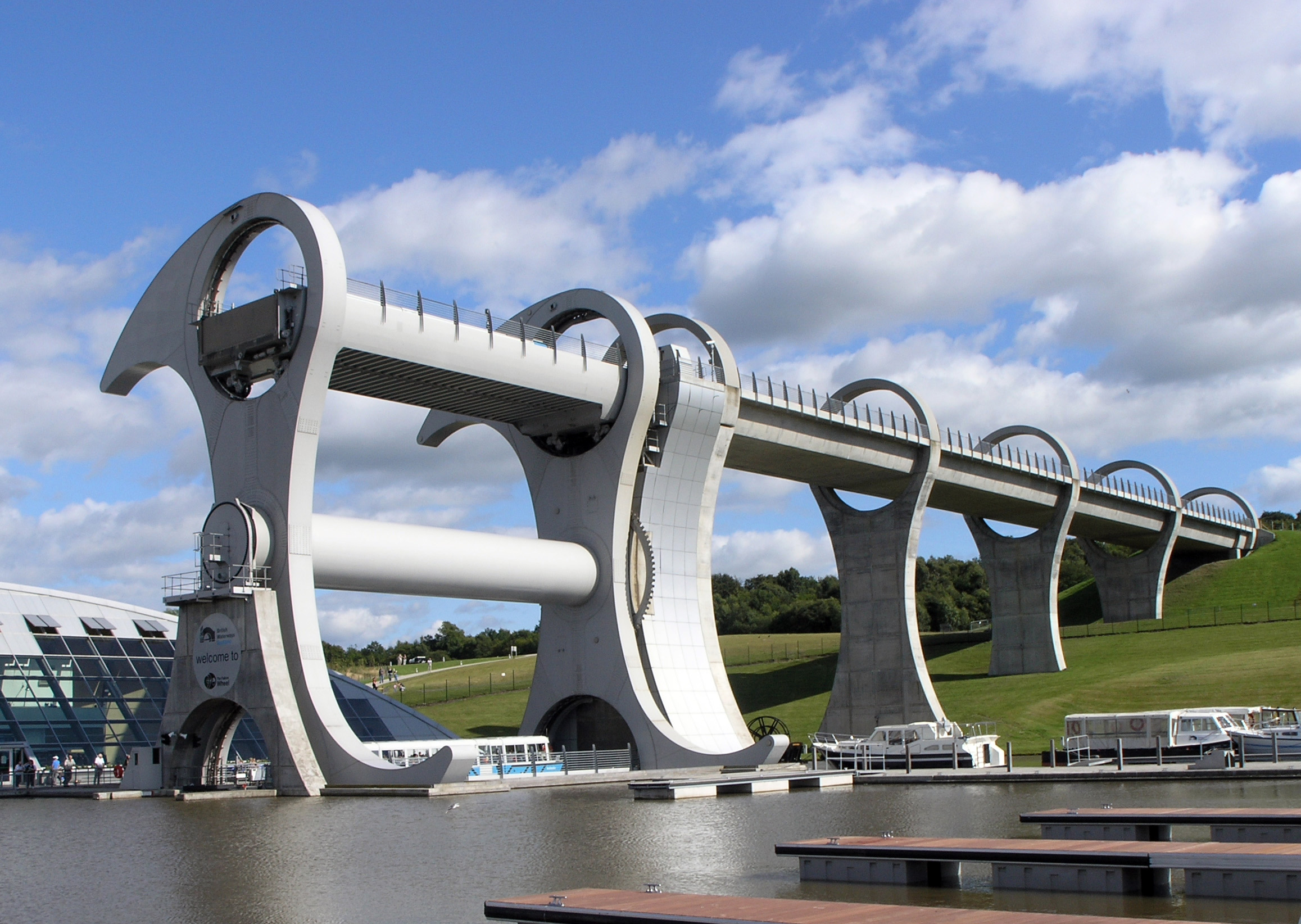
The Falkirk Wheel in Scotland

=== Civil engineering systems ===
Civil engineering systems is a discipline that promotes using systems thinking to manage complexity and change in civil engineering within its broader public context. It posits that the proper development of civil engineering infrastructure requires a holistic, coherent understanding of the relationships between all of the crucial factors that contribute to successful projects while at the same time emphasizing the importance of attention to technical detail. Its purpose is to help integrate the entire civil engineering project life cycle from conception, through planning, designing, making, operating to decommissioning.

== See also ==
- Architectural engineering
- Engineering drawing
- Geological Engineering
- Geomatics engineering
- Glossary of civil engineering
- Index of civil engineering articles
- List of civil engineering software
- List of civil engineers
- List of engineering branches
- List of Historic Civil Engineering Landmarks
- Macro-engineering
- Railway engineering
- Site survey

=== Associations ===
- American Society of Civil Engineers
- Canadian Society for Civil Engineering
- Chartered Institution of Civil Engineering Surveyors
- Council for the Regulation of Engineering in Nigeria
- Earthquake Engineering Research Institute
- Engineers Australia
- European Federation of National Engineering Associations
- International Federation of Consulting Engineers
- Indian Geotechnical Society
- Institution of Civil Engineers
- Institution of Structural Engineers
- Institute of Engineering (Nepal)
- International Society of Soil Mechanics and Geotechnical Engineering
- Institution of Engineers, Bangladesh
- Institution of Engineers (India)
- Institution of Engineers of Ireland
- Institute of Transportation Engineers
- Japan Society of Civil Engineers
- Pakistan Engineering Council
- Philippine Institute of Civil Engineers
- Transportation Research Board
