= Sheriff of Kolkata =

Ceremonial position in India

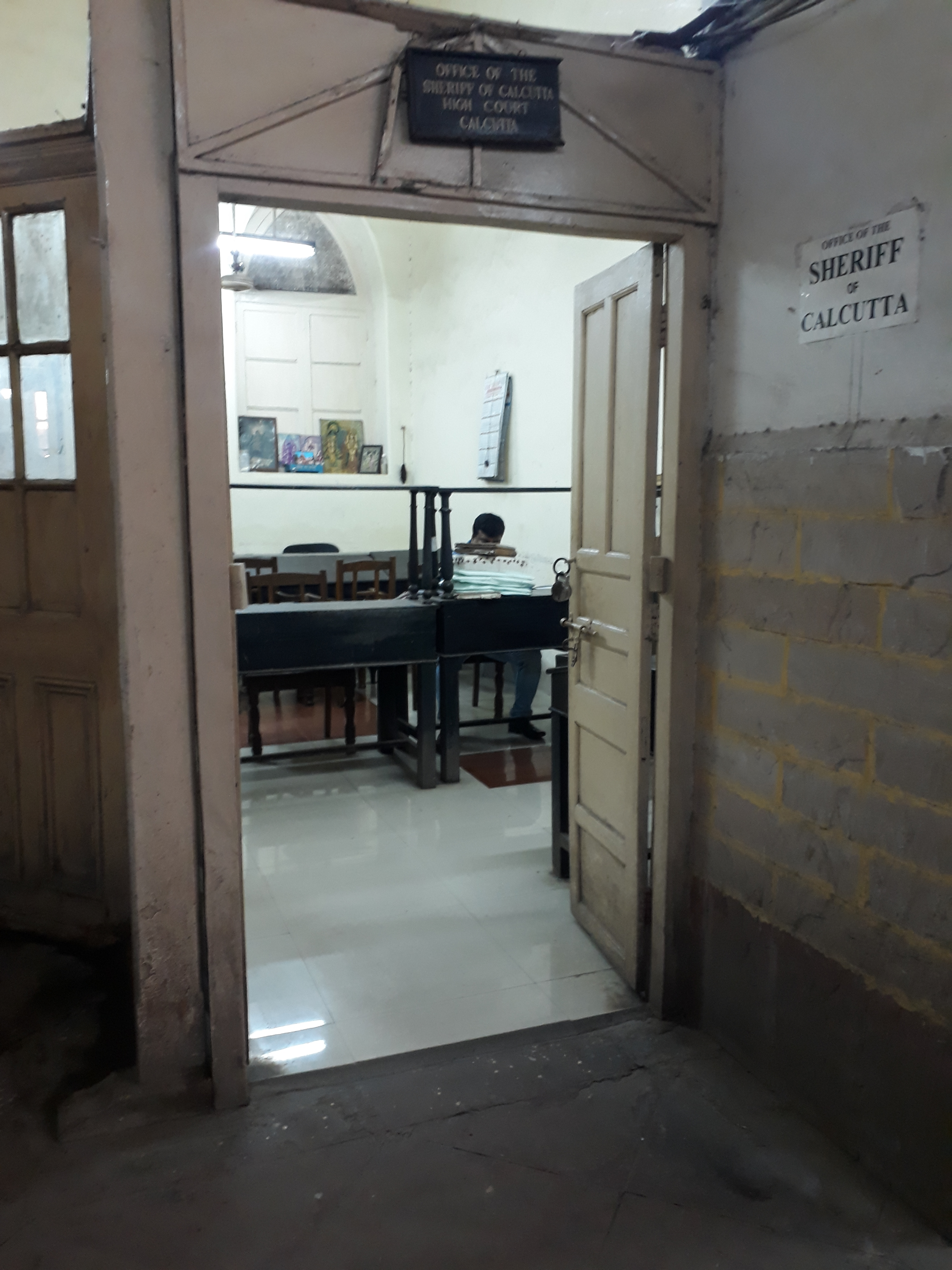
Office of Sheriff inside the Calcutta High Court, (2017)

The Sheriff of Kolkata (formerly known as the Sheriff of Calcutta) is an apolitical titular position of authority bestowed for one year on a prominent citizen of Kolkata (Calcutta). The Sheriff has an office and staff in Calcutta High Court but does not have executive powers. Mumbai (Bombay) and Kolkata (Calcutta) are the only cities in India to maintain the post of the Sheriff. Presently the office of the sheriff is situated in the Calcutta High Court building.

== History ==
The office of Sheriff of Calcutta was established by a Royal Charter issued by King George III of Great Britain on 26 March 1774 which created the Supreme Court at Fort William in Calcutta. The charter stipulated that the sheriff would be appointed by the Governor-General in Council from a list of three residents recommended by the Supreme Court in a similar manner to the system of High Sheriffs in England.

In the early years the sheriff of Calcutta was the executive arm of the judiciary and responsible for the provision of jurors, the safe custody of prisoners and the seizure of goods. From the mid-1800s, the power of the position was gradually reduced until it became today's ceremonial post.

Following Indian independence, The Calcutta Sheriff's Act 1948 (or West Bengal Act XXX of 1948) was enacted on 15 October 1948. This was to regulate the office of Sheriff under the Dominion of India. The Act stated that the Sheriff would now be appointed by the Governor of West Bengal and that the Government of West Bengal would take on the Sheriff's financial obligations while the office would remain as a civic post.

== Notable persons ==
List of sheriffs:

- 1775: James Macrabey, first sheriff
- 1778: John Richardson
- 1779: Sir John Hadley D'Oyly, Bt
- 1840: David Hare
- 1846: James McKilligin
- 1866: Seth Arratoon Apcar, first non-European Sheriff
- 1873: Manekji Rustamji, the first Indian Sheriff
- 1874: Raja Digambar Mitra, politician, writer and first Bengali Sheriff
- 1886: George Yule, merchant
- 1888: Mahendralal Sarkar, doctor and academic
- 1892: James Mackay, 1st Earl of Inchcape
- 1893: Rustamjee Dhanjibhai Mehta
- 1901: Sir George Henry Sutherland
- 1904: Nalin Behari Sircar
- 1905: Baron Cable, British merchant
- 1908: Sir George Henry Sutherland (2nd term)
- 1911: Rajendra Nath Mukharji, industrialist
- 1920: Alfred Pickford, merchant
- 1921: Chunilal Bose, Chemist
- 1935: Abdul Halim Khan Ghuznavi
- 1936: Sir Charles Gordon Arthur
- 1950: Dr Shanti Bhusan Dutt Gupta
- 1955: Dr Amulya Chandra Ukil, physician
- 1957, 1958: Shri Suresh Chandra Roy
- 1968: Ramesh Chandra Majumdar, historian
- 1987: K. S. B. Sanyal, business leader (Chairman of Andrew Yule)
- 1989: Dr Saroj Gupta, oncologist
- 1991: Dr. K. K. H. Siddiqui, Cardiologist
- 1992: Dr. Sanat Kumar Biswas, scientist
- 1994: Basanta Choudhury, film actor
- 1998: Dr. I. S. Roy, Ophthalmologist
- 1999: Dr. Surendra Kumar Sharma, Radiologist
- 2000: Pankaj Lal Roy, cricketer
- 2001: Suchitra Mitra, the first woman Sheriff
- 2002: Sunil Gangopadhyay, Bengali poet
- 2003: Prabir Roy, film producer
- 2004: Dr. Sadhan Chandra Ray
- 2005: Chuni Goswami, sportsman
- 2006: Prof. (Dr.) Amal Chakraborty, pediatrician
- 2007: Rathindra Nath Dutta
- 2008: Dr. Dulal Kumar Basu
- 2009: Santo Jyoti Mittra
- 2010: Utpal Chatterjee, journalist, professor of IISWBM
- 2011: Indrajit Roy, neurosurgeon
- 2013: Dr. Swapan Kumar Ghosh, physician
- 2014: Ranjit Mallick, actor
- 2017: Dr. Sanjay Chattopadhyay, physician
- 2019: Mani Shankar Mukherjee, writer
- 2026: Goutam Ghose

== See also ==
- Sheriff of Mumbai
- Sheriff of Madras
