= Suresh Chandra Roy =

Former Sheriff of Calcutta

Suresh Chandra Roy was elected Sheriff of Calcutta for two consecutive years in 1957 and 1958. He was also awarded the Padma Bhushan, India's prestigious third-highest civilian award, for Trade and Industry in 1971. He further served on the Kolkata local board of the State Bank of India in 1957.
