= Saroj Gupta =

Indian oncologist (1929–2010)

Dr. Saroj Gupta FRCR
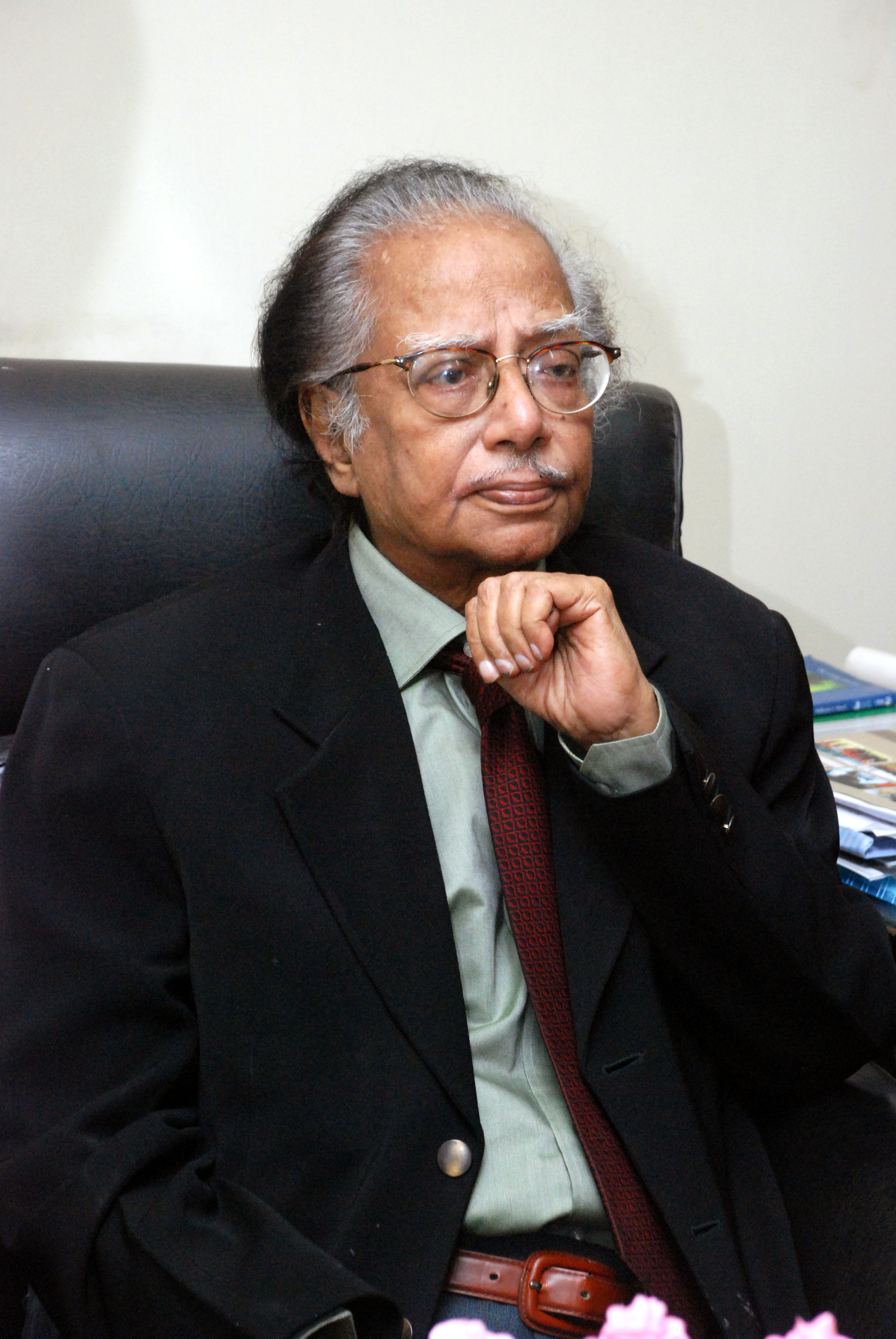
- Saroj Gupta in 2007
- Born: 5 December 1929; Bengal, British India
- Died: 21 May 2010 (aged 80); Kolkata, West Bengal, India
- Education: University of Calcutta (MBBS, 1955); Royal College of Radiologists (FRCR, 1965)
- Occupations: Oncologist, medical researcher
- Known for: Founder of the Saroj Gupta Cancer Centre and Research Institute
- Office: Sheriff of Kolkata (1989)
- Spouse: Ila Gupta
- Children: Anjan Gupta, Dr. Arnab Gupta, Susmita Roy
- Parent(s): Satya Charan Gupta (father); Patit Paboni Devi (mother)
- Awards: Padma Shri (1987)

Saroj Gupta (5 December 1929 – 21 May 2010) was an Indian radiation oncologist, medical educator, and the founder of the Cancer Centre Welfare Home and Research Institute (now renamed the Saroj Gupta Cancer Centre and Research Institute) in Thakurpukur, Kolkata. He was a pioneer of organized, affordable oncology care in eastern India. In recognition of his contributions to medicine, the Government of India awarded him the Padma Shri, the nation's fourth-highest civilian honor, in 1987. He also served as the Sheriff of Kolkata in 1989.

== Early life and education ==
Saroj Gupta was born on 5 December 1929 in Bengal, British India. He grew up in a Bengali family; his parents were Satya Charan Gupta and Patit Paboni Devi. After finishing his primary education, he entered the University of Calcutta, graduating with a Bachelor of Medicine, Bachelor of Surgery (MBBS) degree in 1955.

Gupta chose to specialize in radiation oncology and traveled to the United Kingdom for higher clinical education. In 1965, he completed his postgraduate fellowships and became a Fellow of the Royal College of Radiologists (FRCR).

== Medical career ==
In 1956, Gupta joined the Chittaranjan Cancer Hospital (now known as the Chittaranjan National Cancer Institute) in Kolkata as a consultant radiotherapist. During his clinical service at the state-run institute, he encountered systemic capacity challenges. Due to a severe shortage of specialized oncology beds across the region, patients traveling from remote rural districts were frequently denied immediate admission. By the time they could secure a bed, many patients progressed to advanced stages of the disease. This observation motivated Gupta to establish a dedicated, low-cost institutional alternative for underprivileged cancer patients.

== Founding of the Cancer Centre ==
In the early 1970s, Gupta left his institutional role to focus on building a charitable facility. The family of the late Chintaharan Das donated a 16-acre plot of marshy land in the southern suburban locality of Thakurpukur to aid the project. Alongside a small group of fellow medical professionals and social workers, Gupta officially registered the Cancer Centre and Welfare Home as a non-profit society on 20 February 1973.

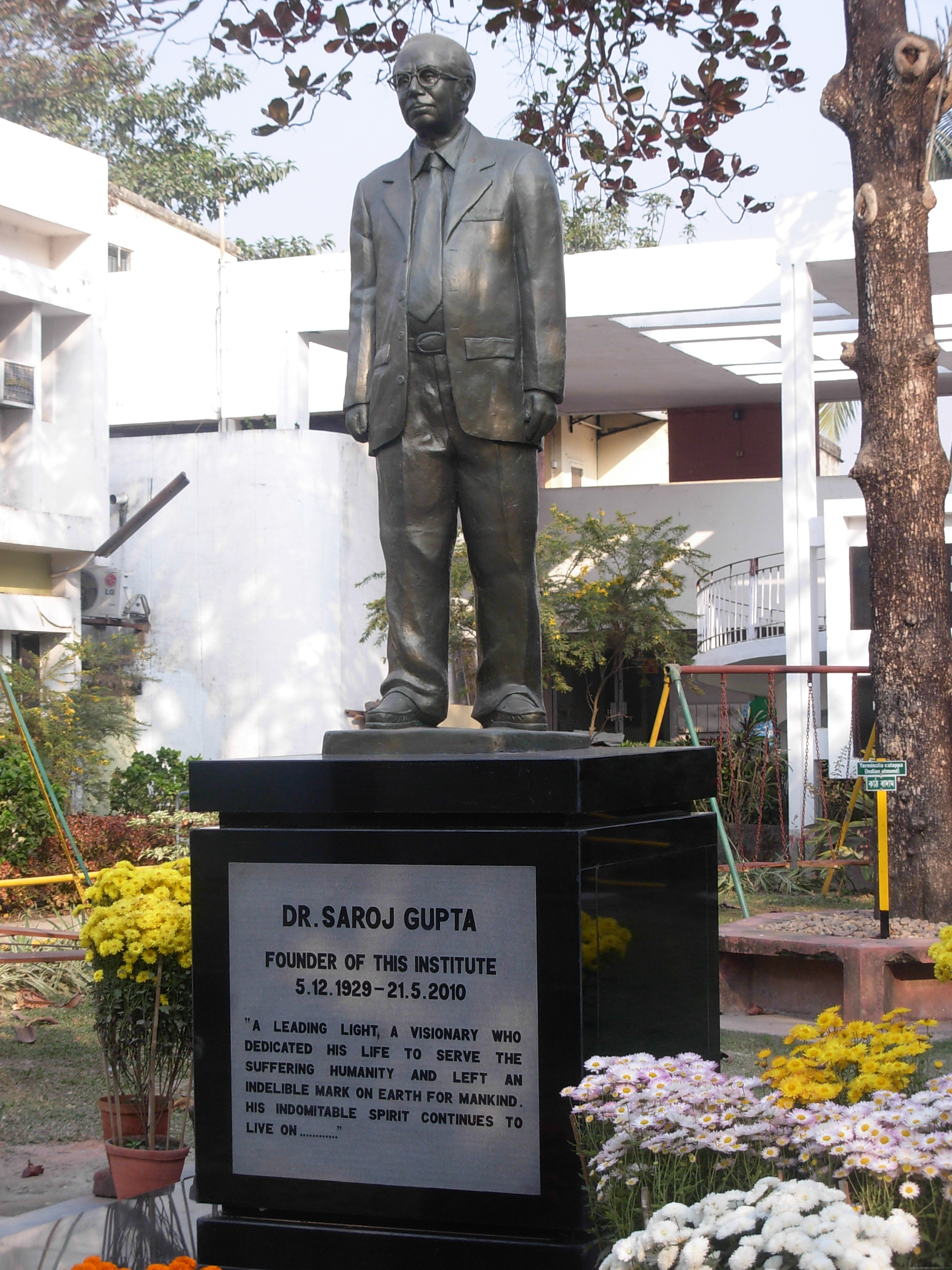
Statue of Dr. Saroj Gupta on the hospital campus.

The facility opened with 25 beds intended to provide medical treatment alongside therapeutic green space. Following his voluntary retirement from the Chittaranjan National Cancer Institute in 1980, Gupta took up the full-time administrative and clinical leadership of the Thakurpukur hospital. Over three decades, the facility grew into a 311-bed comprehensive oncology hub featuring specialized pediatric wings, surgical theatres, and advanced radiation suites.

== Public outreach and literary works ==
To bridge early funding deficits for the construction of the hospital, Gupta employed public theatrical performances. He authored a dramatic script centered on a marginalized cancer patient denied admission to a city hospital. Gupta directed and performed the lead role with a theatrical troupe named Sikha, utilizing the stage to collect public donations, civic contributions, and philanthropic support.

Gupta maintained an interest in creative writing and public health literature throughout his life. He authored essays, awareness columns, and plays designed to alleviate the social stigma surrounding cancer diagnoses in traditional communities. A compilation of his writings, titled Rachana Sangraha, was compiled posthumously.

== Awards and honors ==
- 1987: Awarded the Padma Shri by the Government of India for distinguished services in the field of medicine.
- 1989: Appointed to the civic post of Sheriff of Kolkata.

Year	Award / Honor	Conforming Body
1987	Padma Shri	Government of India
1989	Sheriff of Kolkata	City of Kolkata (Civic Office)

== Personal life and death ==
Gupta was married to Ila Gupta. The couple had three children: Anjan Gupta, Dr. Arnab Gupta (who later took over as a director of the medical institute), and Susmita Roy. Gupta died on 21 May 2010 at the age of 80 following a prolonged illness.

Following his death, the governing society renamed the facility the Saroj Gupta Cancer Centre and Research Institute to commemorate its founder.

== See also ==
- Oncology in India
- List of Padma Shri award recipients (1980–1989)
- Chittaranjan National Cancer Institute
