= Amal Chakraborty =

Indian doctor

Amal Kanti Chakraborty was the Sheriff of Kolkata for the year 2006. He is a paediatrician in the city of Kolkata, West Bengal, India. As a paediatric surgeon, he heads the department of paediatrics in Ramakrishna Mission Seva Sadan hospital.
