= Index of civil engineering articles =

This is an alphabetical list of articles pertaining specifically to civil engineering. For a broad overview of engineering, please see List of engineering topics. For biographies please see List of civil engineers.

== A ==
Accuracy and precision – American Society of Civil Engineers – Applied mechanics – Arch

== B ==
Beam (structure) – Bending – Brittle – Buckling

== C ==
Carbon fiber – Check dam – Classical mechanics – Composite material – Compressive strength – Computational fluid dynamics – Computer-aided design – Conservation of mass – Concrete – Corrosion

== D ==
Dam – Damping ratio – Deformation – Delamination – Design – Dimensionless number – Drafting – Dynamics

== E ==
Elasticity – Engineering drawing – Exploratory engineering

== F ==
Factor of safety – Fatigue – Fillet – Finite element analysis – Finite element method – Fluid mechanics – Force – Friction – Fundamentals of Engineering exam

== G ==
Gauge – Gauge (engineering) – Granular material

== H ==
Heating and cooling systems – Hydraulics – Hydrostatics

== I ==
Inclined plane – Inertia – Instrumentation – Invention

== J ==
Joint

== L ==
Lever – Liability – Life cycle cost analysis – Limit state design – Load transfer

== M ==
Margin of safety – Mass transfer – Materials – Materials engineering – Material selection – Mechanics – Moment – Moment of inertia

== N ==
Normal stress – Nozzle

== P ==
Physics – Plasticity – Plastic moment – Poisson's ratio – Position vector – Pressure – Product lifecycle management – Professional engineer – Project management – Pulley – Pump – Pile foundation

== Q ==
Quality – Quality control – Quantity surveying

== R ==
Reliability engineering – Resistive force – Reverse engineering – Rigid body – Reinforced concrete –

== S ==
Safety engineering – Shear force diagrams – Shear modulus – Shear strength – Shear stress – Simple machine – Simulation – Slide rule – Solid mechanics – Solid modeling – Spoolbase – Statics – Stress–strain curve – Structural failure – Student design competition – Surveying –

== T ==
Technical drawing – Technology – Tensile strength – Tensile stress – Theodolite – Theory of elasticity – Toughness – Turbine –

== V ==
Vector – Viscosity – Vibration

== W ==
Wedge – Weight transfer – Weir

== Y ==
Yield strength – Young's modulus
