= L. K. Ananthakrishna Iyer =

Indian anthropologist

Diwan Bahadur Lakshminarayanapuram Krishna Ananthakrishna Iyer (1861–1937) was an anthropologist of British India. He is known for his work among the hill tribes of the western part of Madras province.

== Early life ==
Ananthakrishna Iyer was born to a Vedic scholar, L. N. Krishna Iyer, in the village of Lakshminarayanapuram near Palghat in the Madras Presidency which is in modern-day Kerala. He was the eldest of four sons and two daughters.

He matriculated from Palaghat High School in 1878 and passed BA from Madras Christian College in 1883.

== Career ==
Ananthakrishna Iyer is best known for his books Castes and Tribes of Mysore and Castes and Tribes of Cochin. Both are pioneering works on the tribes inhabiting India's west coast. He worked at the Revenue Department at Vayanad, then left to join Victoria College Palaghat.

In 1896, he became a headmaster in a Christian school. In 1897, he joined Maharajas College at Eranakulam as a scientific assistant. The log book kept at St Berchmans High School, Changanacherry, states, "He took charge of the school as Headmaster on 22 February 1897. He was there till May that year and left for Ernakulam by former Headmaster Thomas K J kallarakavumkal Mammood P O PIN 686536 Changanacherry Kerala".

His son, L. A. Krishna Iyer, was a noted anthropologist and a Padma Bhushan awardee.

== Works ==
- Tribes and Castes of Cochin. 1909.
- The Anthropology of the Syrian Christians. 1926.
- The Mysore Tribes and Castes. Mysore: Mysore University Press. 1930. (5 volumes)

== Sources ==
- "Diwan Bahadur L. K. Ananthakrishna Iyer" (PDF). Proceedings of the National Institute of Sciences of India. IV. Indian Institute of Science. Archived from the original (PDF) on 16 March 2012.
- Ajit K. Danda, ed. (1989). "L. K. Ananthakrishna Iyer: 125th Birth Anniversary Tribute". Human Science. (Special volume)
