= G. A. Narasimha Rao =

Indian civil engineer

Rao Sahib G. A. Narasimha Rao
- Born: 13 February 1912
- Education: Government Arts College, Rajahmundry; College of Engineering, Guindy
- Occupation: civil engineer
- Awards: Padma Bhushan; 1970

Gainedi Appala Narasimha Rao (13 February 1912 – unknown) was an Indian civil engineer and irrigation expert. During his career, he held key positions in the Public Works Department under the British Raj and later in the Government of India. He was honoured with the Padma Bhushan in 1970 and the title of Rao Sahib, conferred by the British Government of India in 1944.

== Early life ==
Narasimha Rao was born on 13 February 1912. He completed his schooling at Taylor High School, Narsapur. He pursued intermediate education in arts and science at Government Arts College, Rajahmundry, from 1927 to 1929. He subsequently earned a Bachelor of Engineering degree from the College of Engineering, Guindy, in 1933. Narasimha Rao also attended Manchester College of Technology in England from 1946 to 1947, focusing on water supply and drainage systems.

== Career ==
In 1936, Narasimha Rao joined the Madras Government Service as an Assistant Engineer after achieving the highest rank in the competitive examination conducted by the Madras Public Service Commission. During this period, he worked on projects such as constructing district hospital buildings in Kakinada and implementing air raid precaution measures in Madras during World War II. He also managed irrigation and drainage systems in the Godavari delta.

Between 1942 and 1953, Narasimha Rao served as an Executive Engineer in the Public Works Department. He managed the Krishna weir irrigation system, which supported over one million acres of agricultural land. In 1952, the weir was breached during severe floods. Narasimha Rao directed an operation involving the use of scuttled steel barges to close the breach within two weeks, restoring irrigation in the region. He later oversaw the reconstruction of the weir and the construction of the Krishna Barrage at Vijayawada, completed within three working seasons at a cost of ₹2.7 crores.

From 1956 to 1963, Narasimha Rao served as Chief Engineer for the Nagarjuna Sagar Canals project. In 1963, Narasimha Rao was appointed Additional Secretary to the Government of Andhra Pradesh. He oversaw the development of large-scale irrigation projects, including the Nagarjuna Sagar and Srisailam Hydro-Electric Projects. In 1968, he was appointed Chairman of the Central Water and Power Commission under the Ministry of Irrigation and Power, a role he held until 1970. In 1970, he joined United Nations organisation as Adviser, Water Resources.

Narasimha Rao was a member of professional organizations such as the Institution of Engineers (India), the Indian National Society of Soil Mechanics and Foundation Engineers, and the International Commission on Irrigation and Drainage, where he served as Vice President (1969–1970).

He represented India at various international conferences, including the 1959 International Conference on Irrigation and Drainage in Australia and symposium on 'Floods and their Computation' sponsored by UNESCO and WMO at Leningrad in August 1967.

== Recognition ==
Narasimha Rao was conferred the title of Rao Sahib by the British Government of India in 1944. Narasimha Rao was awarded the Padma Bhushan in 1970 for his contributions to civil engineering.
