= Saroj Gupta Cancer Centre and Research Institute =

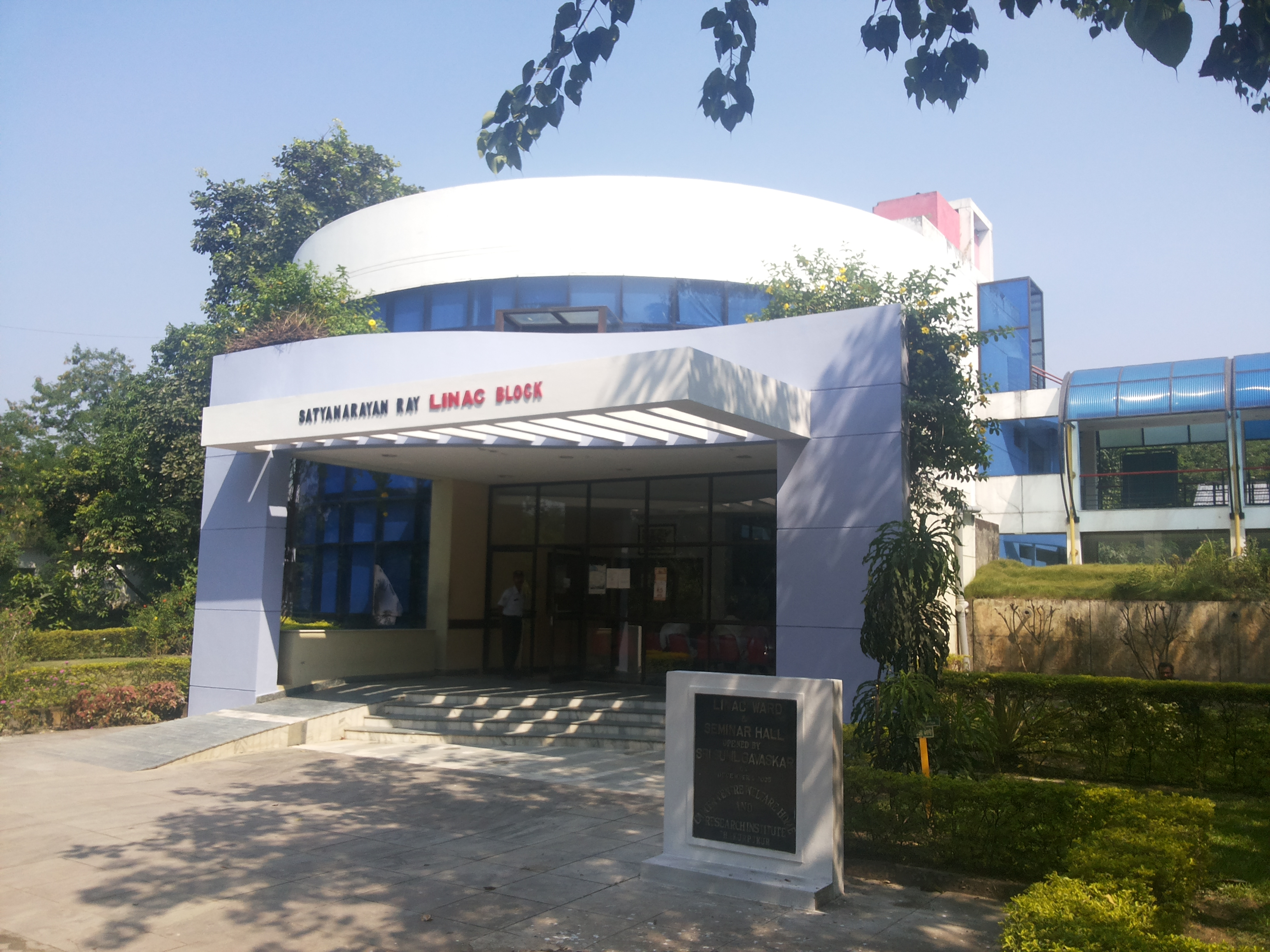
- Linear accelerator (LINAC) block at SGCC&RI

Geography
- Location: Mahatma Gandhi Road, Greater Bakul Bithi, West Bengal, India

Services
- Beds: 311

History
- Founded: 1973

Links
- Website: www.sgccri.org
- Lists: Hospitals in India

Saroj Gupta Cancer Centre and Research Institute (SGCC&RI), formerly known as the Cancer Centre Welfare Home & Research Institute, is a non-profit tertiary cancer care hospital located in Thakurpukur, in the southern outskirts of Kolkata, West Bengal, India.

Founded in 1973 by oncologist Saroj Gupta, the institution was established to provide specialised cancer treatment to patients from economically disadvantaged backgrounds. The hospital campus covers approximately 16 acres and has developed into a comprehensive oncology centre with more than 300 beds and several specialised clinical departments.

SGCC&RI provides diagnostic, treatment, research and training services related to cancer care and serves patients from eastern India and neighbouring regions.

== History ==
The institute was founded in 1973 by physician Saroj Gupta, who worked in oncology and advocated the creation of a dedicated cancer hospital accessible to patients from rural and economically disadvantaged backgrounds.

Land for the institution was donated by the family of Chintaharan Das at Thakurpukur, which was then a marshy area on the outskirts of Kolkata.

The hospital began as a small 25-bed facility known as the Cancer Centre Welfare Home. Early funding for the institution was raised through public donations and fundraising initiatives organised by local community groups.

Over the following decades the centre expanded into a specialised oncology hospital serving patients from across West Bengal and neighbouring states.

== Facilities and clinical services ==
The institute offers diagnostic and treatment services across several oncology disciplines.

Clinical departments include:

- Surgical oncology
- Medical oncology
- Radiation therapy
- Haemato-oncology
- Radiology
- Pathology
- Microbiology
- Molecular genetics laboratory
- Dialysis services
- Pain and palliative care
- Supportive therapy services
- Tobacco cessation and nicotine replacement therapy clinics

The hospital operates outpatient diagnostic clinics and treatment programmes covering major cancer types including breast cancer, gastrointestinal cancers, gynaecological cancers, thoracic cancers and head and neck cancers.

== Academic and research activities ==
SGCC&RI conducts academic training programmes related to oncology and cancer research.

These include postgraduate medical education and clinical training programmes in oncology-related disciplines. The institute also maintains a specialised medical library containing national and international oncology journals.

Research activities conducted at the institute include studies in cancer diagnosis, radiotherapy techniques and molecular oncology.

== Public health initiatives ==
The institute participates in cancer awareness and prevention programmes in collaboration with national and international organisations.

One such initiative involved a month-long awareness programme promoting Nicotine replacement therapy aimed at discouraging tobacco consumption.

These programmes have included collaborations with academic and medical institutions in India, Japan and the United Kingdom.

== Recognition and affiliations ==
The institute is affiliated with the Union for International Cancer Control (UICC), headquartered in Geneva, Switzerland.

It has also been recognised by the European Society for Medical Oncology as a centre participating in integrated oncology and palliative care initiatives.

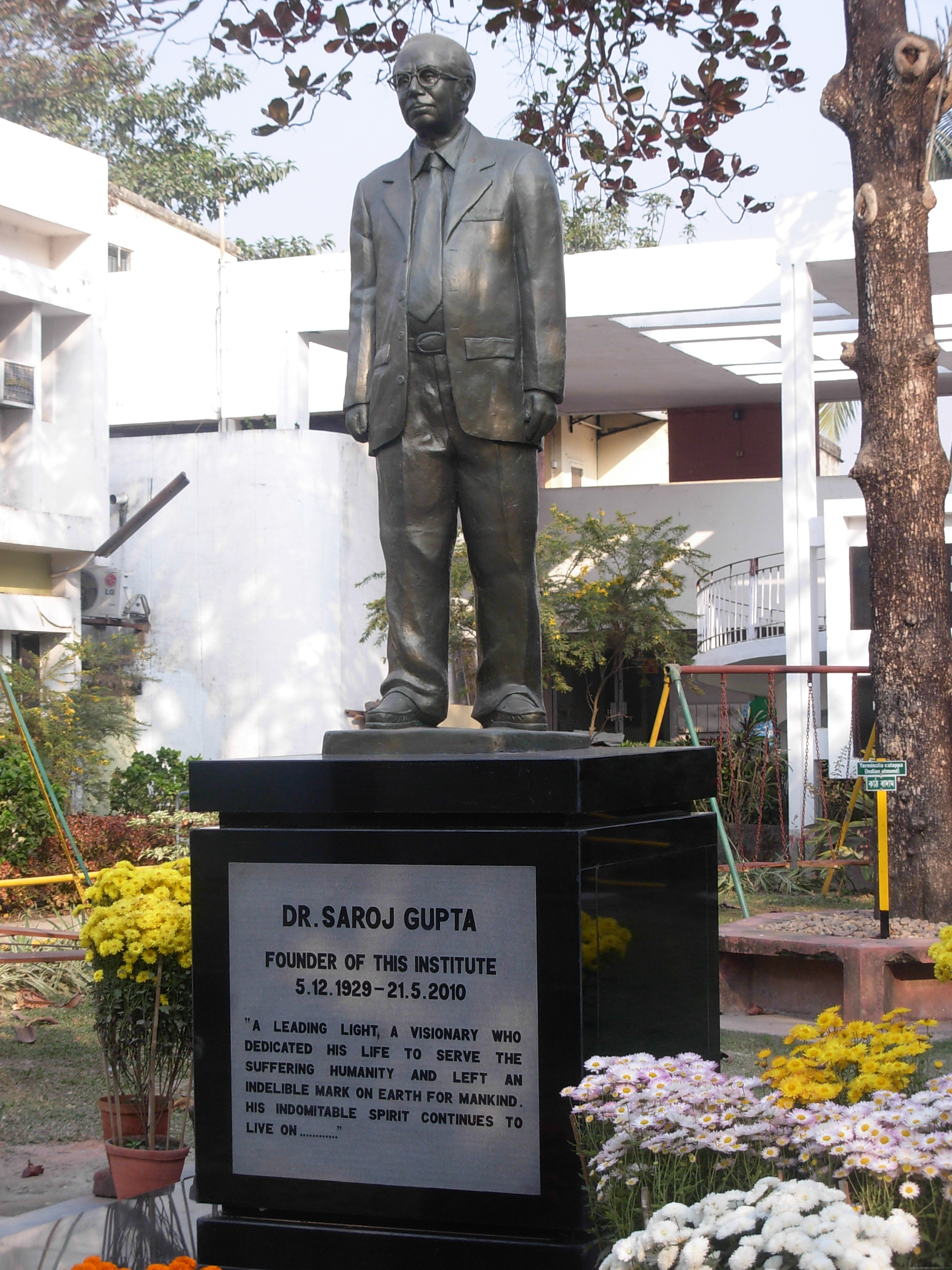
Statue of Saroj Gupta at the institute campus

== See also ==
- Saroj Gupta
- Healthcare in Kolkata
- Cancer treatment
- Oncology
- List of hospitals in India
