= Parmeshwari Lal Varma =

Indian civil engineer

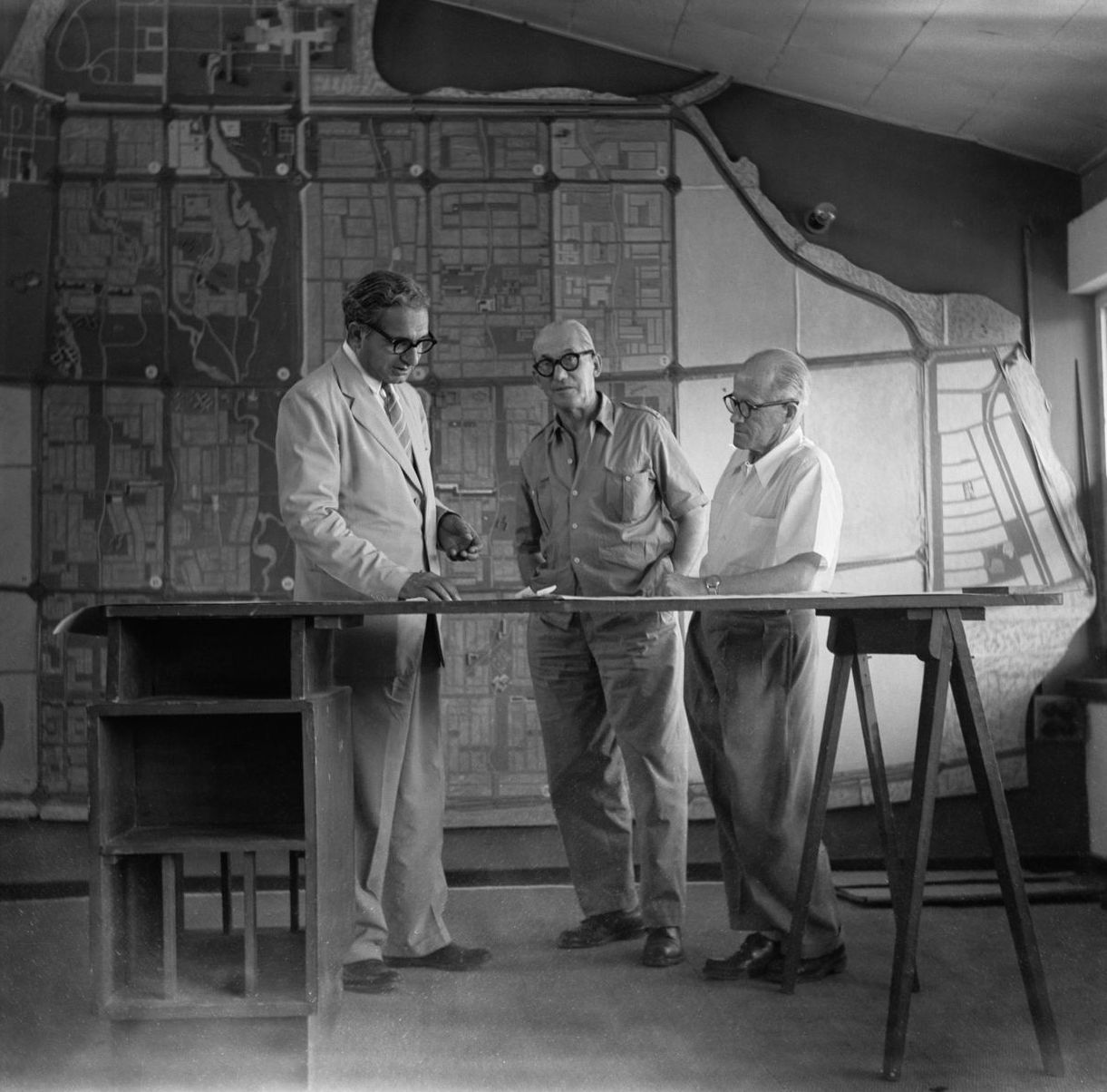
- Varma (left) with Le Corbusier and Pierre Jeanneret in 1955
- Born: 6 December 1920; Punjab, India
- Died: pre–2001
- Occupation: Civil engineer
- Known for: Chandigarh city
- Awards: 1971 Padma Bhushan

Parmeshwari Lal Varma (born 6 December 1920, date of death unknown), often shortened to P. L. Varma, is an Indian civil engineer and a former chief engineer of Punjab.

== Life ==
He served as an associate of Le Corbusier, the Swiss-French architect, who designed the city of Chandigarh. There have been reports that Le Corbusier wanted Verma to assist him even past his retirement from service for which Jawaharlal Nehru, the then prime minister of India, unsuccessfully requested the Government of Punjab for the extension of Verma's service. His involvement in the making of Chandigarh has been documented in a book, Le Corbusier Rediscovered: Chandigarh and Beyond, in which he has written a special article.

== Awards ==
The Government of India awarded him Padma Bhushan, the third highest Indian civilian award, in 1971. In June 2001, The Tribune noted that Verma was deceased.

== See also ==
- Maxwell Fry
- Jane Drew
