= Gopinath Aman =

Indian activist

- Born: 1899; India
- Occupations: Journalist; Poet; Writer
- Known for: Urdu literature
- Awards: Padma Bhushan

Gopinath Aman was an Indian independence activist, journalist and poet of Urdu literature. Born in 1899, He headed the Public Relations Committee of the Delhi administration in the 1950s. Bare Admiyon Ke Tanz O Mizah, Caurang, Aqidat ke phul; Gandhiji ki ḥayat aur shahadat par muk̲h̲talif shuʻarā ka muntak̲h̲ab-i kalam, Naz̲r-i aqīdat : shaʼir-i azam Rabindara Natha Ṭagore, Urdu aur usaka sahitya and Aqidat ke phul are some of his notable works.

== Awards ==
- 1997: The Government of India awarded Gopinath Aman the third highest civilian honour of the Padma Bhushan, in 1977, for his contributions to literature.
