= L. A. Krishna Iyer =

Indian anthropologist

- Born: Kerala, India
- Occupations: Anthropologist; Historian
- Known for: Anthropological writings
- Children: L.K. Ananthakrishnan, L. K. Balaratnam, L.K. Ramachandran and LK Padmanabhan
- Parent: L. K. Ananthakrishna Iyer
- Awards: Padma Bhushan

Lakshminarayanapuram Ananthakrishna Krishna Iyer was an Indian anthropologist and a writer of several books on the subject. He was the head of the department of Anthropology at the University of Madras and was credited with studies on the tribal and scheduled caste people of Kerala, a work initiated by his father, L. K. Ananthakrishna Iyer, himself a noted anthropologist. Anthropology in India, Social History of Kerala, a two-volume historical study and The Travancore Tribes and Castes, a three-volume account of the tribal people of southern Kerala are some of his notable works. The Government of India awarded him the third highest civilian honour of the Padma Bhushan, in 1972, for his contributions to science. His sons, L.K. Ananthakrishnan, L. K. Balaratnam, is also a known anthropologist. Dr L.K. Ramachandran noted Scientist/ Bio-Chemist/> L.K. Padmanabhan His daughters, L.K. Lakshmi, L.K. Kamalam, L.K. Bhagirathy and L.K. Parvathy.

== See also ==
- L. K. Ananthakrishna Iyer
