= Surrendar Saini =

Indian social worker

- Born: India
- Occupation: Social worker
- Awards: Padma Bhushan

Surrendar Saini is an Indian social worker and the chairperson of the Bhavan Institute of Indian Art and Culture. She is the Pradesh chairperson of the Bharat Sevak Samaj, Delhi and the chairperson of the Delhi Social Welfare Advisory Board, a State Government sponsored organization for women and child welfare. She was a member of the committee set up by the Ministry of Social Justice and Empowerment in 1999 for proposing amendments to the Persons with Disabilities Act of 1995. The Government of India awarded her the third highest civilian honour of the Padma Bhushan, in 1970, for her contributions to society.
