= Vennelakanti Raghavayya =

Indian freedom activist and social worker

Vennelakanti Raghavaiah
- Born: 4 June 1897; Singapeta village, near Kovur, Nellore district, Andhra Pradesh
- Died: 24 November 1981 (aged 84)

Vennelakanti Raghavaiah B.A., B.L. (June 1897 – 24 November 1981) was a social worker and Indian freedom activist. He was affectionately called "Girijan Gandhi" for his service to the Adivasi people.

He is born at Singapeta village in Kovur Taluq of Nellore district to Vennelakanti Papayya and Subbamma. He completed Bachelor of Arts and Bachelor of Laws degrees from Madras University. He joined the Indian National Congress led by Mahatma Gandhi and participated in the Non-cooperation movement and Salt Satyagraha, and was jailed for 21 months. He was again arrested for participating in Quit India movement.

He was elected to the Combined Madras State from the Nellore constituency for two terms. He held the position of parliamentary secretary in 1946 headed by Tanguturi Prakasam. During his tenure, he fought for the scrapping of the Criminal Tribes Act of 1871.

He received Padma Bhushan from Government of India in 1973.
