= N. Ramaswami Ayyar =

Indian educationist, social reformer and lawyer

- Born: 1896; Tiruchirapalli, Tamil Nadu, India
- Died: 1976 (aged 79–80)
- Occupations: Educationist; Social reformer Lawyer
- Known for: N. Ramaswami Ayyar Educational Complex
- Children: R. Panchapakesan

Natesaganabadigal Ramaswami Ayyar (1896–1976) was an Indian educationist, social reformer and lawyer from Tiruchirapalli, in the south Indian state of Tamil Nadu.

== Early life and career ==
Born in 1896 in an orthodox Hindu family, he started his career as a criminal lawyer, but abandoned his practice in the 1930s to start Savitri Vidyasala, a girls' school in Tiruchirapalli in 1938, when girls' education was a taboo in the society. The institution grew over the years into an educational group which included several institutions such as Savithri Vidyasala Hindu Girls’ Higher Secondary School, Seethalakshmi Ramaswami College, Kamakoti Vidyalaya and Padmabhushan Sri. N. Ramaswami Ayyar Memorial Polytechnic College for Girls, with a total strength of over 10,000 students. All the institutions are housed in N. Ramaswami Ayyar Educational Complex, a 30-acre complex and offer education from primary to post graduate levels as well as vocational courses. The Government of India awarded him the third highest civilian honour of the Padma Bhushan, in 1971, for his contributions to education. The youngest of his three sons, R. Panchapakesan, carries on with his father's efforts and is the head of the Group.

== Death ==
Ayyar died in 1976, at the age of 80.
