= Chunilal Bose =

Bengali physician

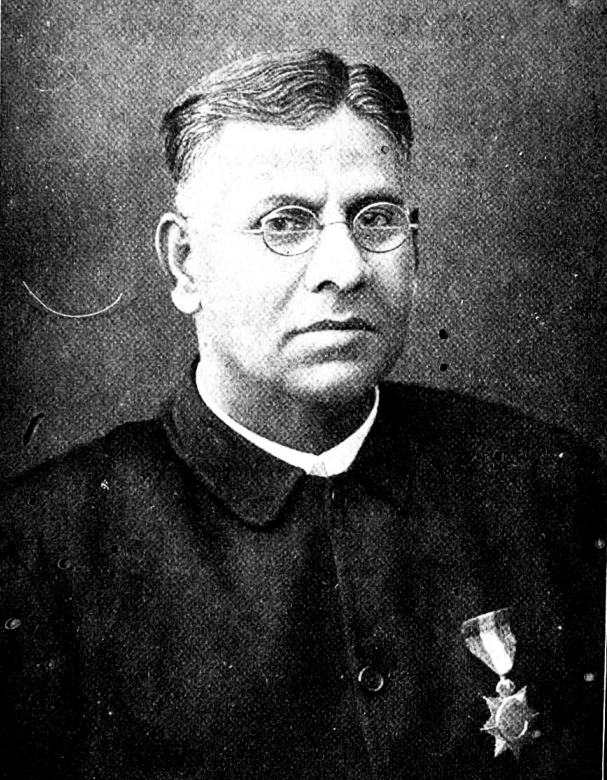

Chunilal Bose (13 March 1861 – 3 August 1930) was an Indian physician, chemist, and public health promoter who served in the Bengal Presidency as a professor at the Calcutta Medical College and as a government chemical examiner.

== Life and work ==
Bose was born in Shyambazar, Calcutta, the second son of Babu Denonath Bose. The family originated in Changripota near Harinavi, 24 Parganas district. He received schooling at the Upper Primary School at Shyambazar, later at Northbrook School and the Metropolitan Institution. He then went to the Sanskrit Collegiate School and joined the Calcutta Medical College in 1880. He joined the government service in 1886 as an assistant surgeon and in 1887 he became assistant chemical examiner for Bengal. He also served as an assistant professor of chemistry at the Calcutta Medical College under C. J. H. Warden. He served in Upper Burma briefly and returned to Calcutta in 1888. He served in the chemical examiner position and remained in the medico-legal section of the college until 1915 when he was made Chief Chemical Examiner. He retired in 1920 and died in Ranchi.

Bose published extensively and a complete list of his publications was compiled by his son Jyoti Prakash Bose in 1924–25. His work included chemical assays, studies on medicinal plants (such as Rauwolfia serpentina, Nerium, Luffa, Hygrophila spinosa), diabetes, snakebite, smallpox, and on poisoning. He was active in the Calcutta Temperance Foundation. He also wrote in the popular magazines on public health and hygiene topics including addiction, food quality, nutrition, and adulteration. He also had an interest in the history of paper and match manufacture.

Bose was given the title of Rai Bahadur in 1898. He also received the honorary title of "Rasāyanācārya". In 1921 he was made Sheriff of Calcutta. He was made CIE in 1922. He was involved in the Bengal Chemicals and Pharmaceutical Limited company whose board he served in from its founding in 1899. Several of his students became pioneers of pharmaceutical industry including Bhailal Dajibhai Amin (1878–1950) . Bose married Tilottama Devi in 1882 and they had two sons and two daughters.
