= Ratan Lal Joshi =

Indian independence activist, journalist, writer (1922–2006)

- Born: 28 June 1922; Churu, Rajasthan, India
- Died: 19 September 2006 (aged 84); Mumbai, Maharashtra, India
- Occupations: Journalist; Indian independence activist
- Awards: Padma Bhushan

Ratan Lal Joshi (1922–2006) was an Indian independence activist, journalist, writer. Born on 28 June 1922 at Churu, a desert city then in Bikaner State. Joshi was involved with the Indian freedom struggle from the age of 18 and suffered incarceration during the Quit India movement. Choosing journalism as a career, he joined Harijan weekly founded by Mahatma Gandhi and trained under the then chief editor, Kishorelal Bhai Mashrulawa. Later, he worked at several publishing houses and edited journals such as Bhai-Bahin, Samaj Sewak, Veer Bhoomi, Rajasthan, Rajasthan Samaj, and Kul Lakshmi. Lal kile main, Krantikari Prer ne Ke Srot and Mrityunjayee are three books published by him.

== Career ==
After the Indian independence, Joshi was associated with several organizations. He was the founder president of Shaheed Smarak Eavam Swadhinata Sangram Shodh Sansthan, a Jaipur-based organization, Secretary of the All-India Freedom Fighters' Organisation and a member of the presidium of the Rajasthan Freedom Fighters' Organisation. During the early 1970s, he was a close advisor of Indira Gandhi. He died on 19 September 2006, at Mumbai, at the age of 84.

== See also ==
- Navajivan Trust
