= Organic Farming Association of India =

Indian organisation for organic farmers

- Formation: January 1, 2002; 24 years ago
- Type: Organic Farmers Association
- Purpose: Social, Non Profit
- Headquarters: Goa, India
- Region served: India
- Official language: English
- Website: ofai.org

Organic Farming Association of India (OFAI) is a pan Indian organisation for organic farmers. It claims to be the biggest network for organic farmers.

The organisation organize various conferences, conventions and events to promote organic farming. The organisation also hosted "Organic World Congress" in 2017. The event was attended by the President of India and several ministers.
