= N. M. Wagle =

Indian civil servant and business executive

- Born: Maharashtra, India
- Occupation(s): Civil servant Business executive
- Awards: Padma Bhushan

N. M. Wagle is a former Indian civil servant, business executive and a former managing director of Greaves Cotton Ltd., chairman of Crompton Greaves Ltd. He headed the City and Industrial Development Corporation (CIDCO), a Maharashtra Government agency, for five consecutive terms (1970–75), becoming the longest serving chairman in the institution's history. He was the first Indian to serve as the president of the Associated Chambers of Commerce and Industry of India (ASSOCHAM), one of the premier trade organizations in India. He also served as the president of the Bombay Chamber of Commerce and Industry for two terms, in 1961 and 1968. The Government of India awarded him the third highest civilian honour of the Padma Bhushan, in 1970, for his contributions to Indian industry.

== See also ==
- Associated Chambers of Commerce and Industry of India
