= Annasaheb Sahasrabuddhe =

Indian independence activist, Gandhian, social worker

- Born: India
- Occupations: Indian independence activist Gandhian; Social worker
- Known for: Bhoodan movement
- Awards: Padma Bhushan

Annasaheb Sahasrabuddhe was an Indian independence activist, Gandhian, social worker and one of the leaders of Bhoodan movement, initiated by Vinoba Bhave. He was the secretary of Sevagram Trust, Wardha and chaired the Standing Committee of Rural Industries set up by the Government of India, under the aegis of the Planning Commission of India in 1960. When Vinoba Bhave introduced Gramdan program as a part of the Bhoodan movement, Sahasrabuddhe was entrusted with the implementation of the program in Koraput district of Odisha and it was reported that he carried out the scheme successfully. He was a close associate of Baba Amte, a renowned social activist. The Government of India awarded him the third highest civilian honour of the Padma Bhushan, in 1970, for his contributions to the society. The story of his life has been documented in his autobiography, Mazi Jadan (My Nurturing). The Organic Farming Association of India (OFAI) has instituted an annual award, Annasaheb Sahasrabuddhe Award, in his memory.
