= Indian Geotechnical Society =

The Indian Geotechnical Society (IGS) aims at promoting co-operation amongst engineers and scientists for the advancement and dissemination of knowledge in the fields of Soil Mechanics, Foundation Engineering, Soil Dynamics, Engineering Geology, Rock Mechanics, Snow and Ice Mechanics and allied fields and their practical applications. It provides a common forum for academics, research workers, designers, construction engineers, equipment manufacturers and others interested in geotechnical activity.

== Awards ==
Awards numbering over twenty have been instituted by the IGS for outstanding technical papers published through the Society. Besides, Prof. G. A. Leonards of Purdue University has instituted an award for the best Ph. D. thesis in Geotechnical Engineering.

The IGS - Kueckelmann award is presented once in two years to an eminent geotechnical engineer who has made significant contribution to the profession in India. So far 16 eminent Geotechnical Engineers have thus been honoured.

To encourage Chapter oriented activities, an Award designated IGS-Ferroco Terzaghi Oration is being instituted for outstanding contribution to Geotechnial Engineering. The Award carries an amount of Rs. One Lakh plus expenses.

- Major IGS Awards (Biennial)
  - IGS-Ferroco Terzaghi Oration by an Outstanding National/International Geotechnical Engineer. Prize Rs.1 Lakh & expenses. Organised through IGS Chapters.
  - IGS-Kueckelmann Award of Rs. 35,000 for Outstanding cumulative contribution in Geotechnical Engineering.
  - IGS-AIMIL Shri H.C. Verma Memorial cash Award of Rs.25,000/- on Innovative Instrumentation.
  - IGS-Prof. Dinesh Mohan Prize for Excellence in Geotechnical Practices.
  - IGS-Prof. Leonards’ Prize for the Best Doctoral Dissertation in Geotechnical Engineering.
- Some of the IGS Best Paper Awards (Biennial)
  - IGS-AIMIL Prize for the best paper published in the Indian Geotechnical Journal.
  - IGS-HEICO Prize for the best paper on Rock Mechanics published in Indian Geotechnical Journal.
  - IGS-AIMIL Prize for the best paper on Instrumentation.
  - IGS-AFCONS Prize for the best paper on Case Histories.
  - IGS-Shri B. N. Gupta, Madras Prize for the best paper on Shallow Foundations.
  - IGS-Smt Indra Joshi Prize for the best paper in National / International Conferences / Symposia.
  - IGS-ONGC Prize for the best paper on Special Studies in the Area of Marine Geotechnical Engineering.
  - IGS-Dr. Shamsher Prakash Prize for the best paper on Soil Dynamics.
  - IGS-Prof. Dinesh Mohan Prize for the best paper on Pile Foundation.
  - IGS-Dr B. B. Rai - Shri S. N. Gupta Prize for the best paper on Earth and Earth-Retaining Structures.

== Local Chapters ==
To promote closer interaction amongst geotechnical engineers spread all over the country, local chapters of the Society were introduced in 1968 and at present Thirty local chapters are functional.
