= Subramanian Kalyanaraman =

Indian neurosurgeon

- Born: 1 January 1934 (age 92); Tiruchirapalli, Tamil Nadu, India
- Education: National High School, Tiruchirapalli; St. Joseph's College, Tiruchirappalli; Stanley Medical College; University of Madras; Royal College of Surgeons of Edinburgh
- Known for: Neurosurgery; Stereotactic surgery
- Awards: 1969 Shanti Swarup Bhatnagar Prize; 2003 Acharya Seva Ratnam Award; 2007 MNT Lifetime Achievement Award; 2008 Chetas Chikitsa Chintamani Award; 2009 For the Sake of Honor Award; 2010 Param Acharya Award; 2012 Sri G. K. Subramaniya Iyer Award; 2013 IMA Kodambakkam Lifetime Achievement Award
- Scientific career
- Fields: Neurosurgery
- Workplaces: Western General Hospital; Apollo Hospitals, Chennai; Madras Medical College; Sooriya Hospital, Chennai; Anuradha Clinic
- Doctoral advisor: Francis Gillingham; Norman Dott

Subramanian Kalyanaraman (born 1934) is an Indian neurosurgeon and a former head of the Department of Neurosurgery at Apollo Hospitals, Chennai. He was known for his pioneering techniques in stereotactic surgery and is an elected fellow of a number of science and medical academies including the National Academy of Medical Sciences and the Indian Academy of Sciences. The Council of Scientific and Industrial Research, the apex agency of the Government of India for scientific research, awarded him the Shanti Swarup Bhatnagar Prize for Science and Technology, one of the highest Indian science awards for his contributions to Medical Sciences in 1969. (Note: Long link - please select award year to see details)

== Biography ==
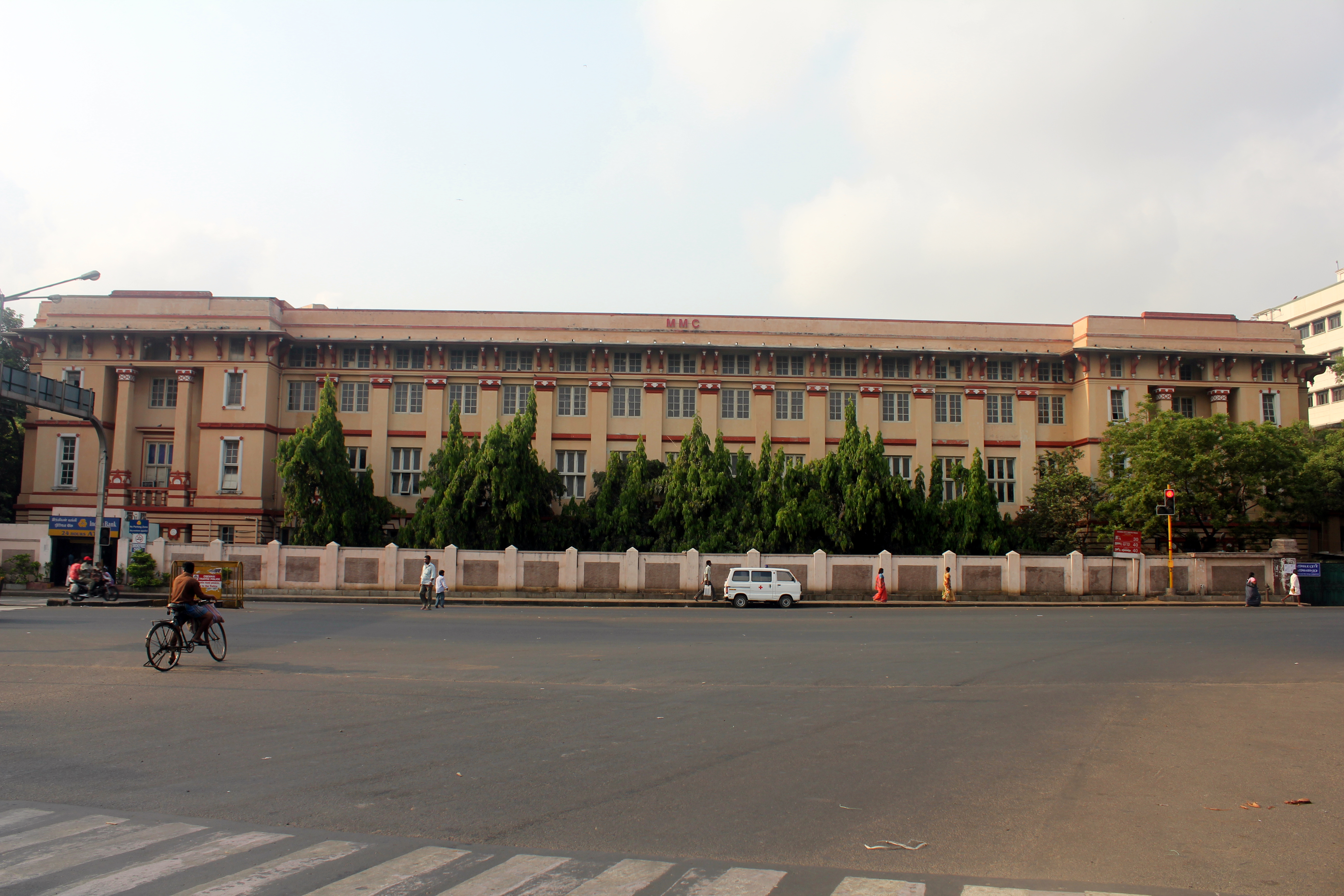
Madras Medical College

S. Kalyanaraman, born on the New Year's Day of 1934 at Tiruchirapalli in the south Indian state of Tamil Nadu, did his schooling at National High School and after passing the SSLC examination in 1948, (Note: He set a school record and stood second in the state) he completed his intermediate studies at St. Joseph's College, Tiruchirappalli, standing second in the state in the final examinations. He moved to Chennai for his medical studies at Stanley Medical College from where he completed MBBS in 1956 and MS in 1959. Subsequently, earning a Commonwealth scholarship, he pursued higher studies in the UK and became a fellow of the Royal College of Surgeons of London and the Royal College of Surgeons of Edinburgh in 1961. It was during this period, he trained neurosurgery under such notable neurosurgeons as Francis Gillingham and Norman Dott. Continuing in the UK, he worked at Western General Hospital for a while. He received the fellowship of the International College of Surgeons in 1964, the same year as he was awarded a PhD in neurosurgery by the Royal College of Edinburgh, thus becoming the first Indian to receive a PhD in neurosurgery. On his return to India, he joined the Institute of Neurology of Madras Medical College (MMC) and Government General Hospital, Chennai where came under the guidance of Balasubramaniam Ramamurthi, neurosurgeon and Padma Bhushan recipient who founded the institute in 1950.

At Madras Medical College, he was a member of the team fostered by Ramamurthi which consisted of known neurosurgeons viz. V. Balasubramanian, G. Arjun Das and K. Jagannathan. He became a professor in 1968 and served the institution till his superannuation in 1991, heading the Department of Neurosurgery from 1986. After his retirement from government service, he became the head of the neurosurgery department at Apollo Hospitals, Chennai, to work alongside Prathap C. Reddy, a known cardiologist, where he worked till 2012, heading the department till 2008 and, serving as a consultant neurosurgeon thereafter. In between, he was associated with Sooriya Hospital, Chennai and founded the department of neurosurgery at the hospital. He continues his medical practice at Anuradha Clinic, a private consultative facility attached to his residence in Kilpauk Garden Colony.

Kalyanaraman is married to Pattammal and the couple has two children. K. Subramanian, his son, heads the department of neurosurgery at Sooriya Hospital, and his daughter, Anuradha, is a consultant neurologist.

== Legacy ==
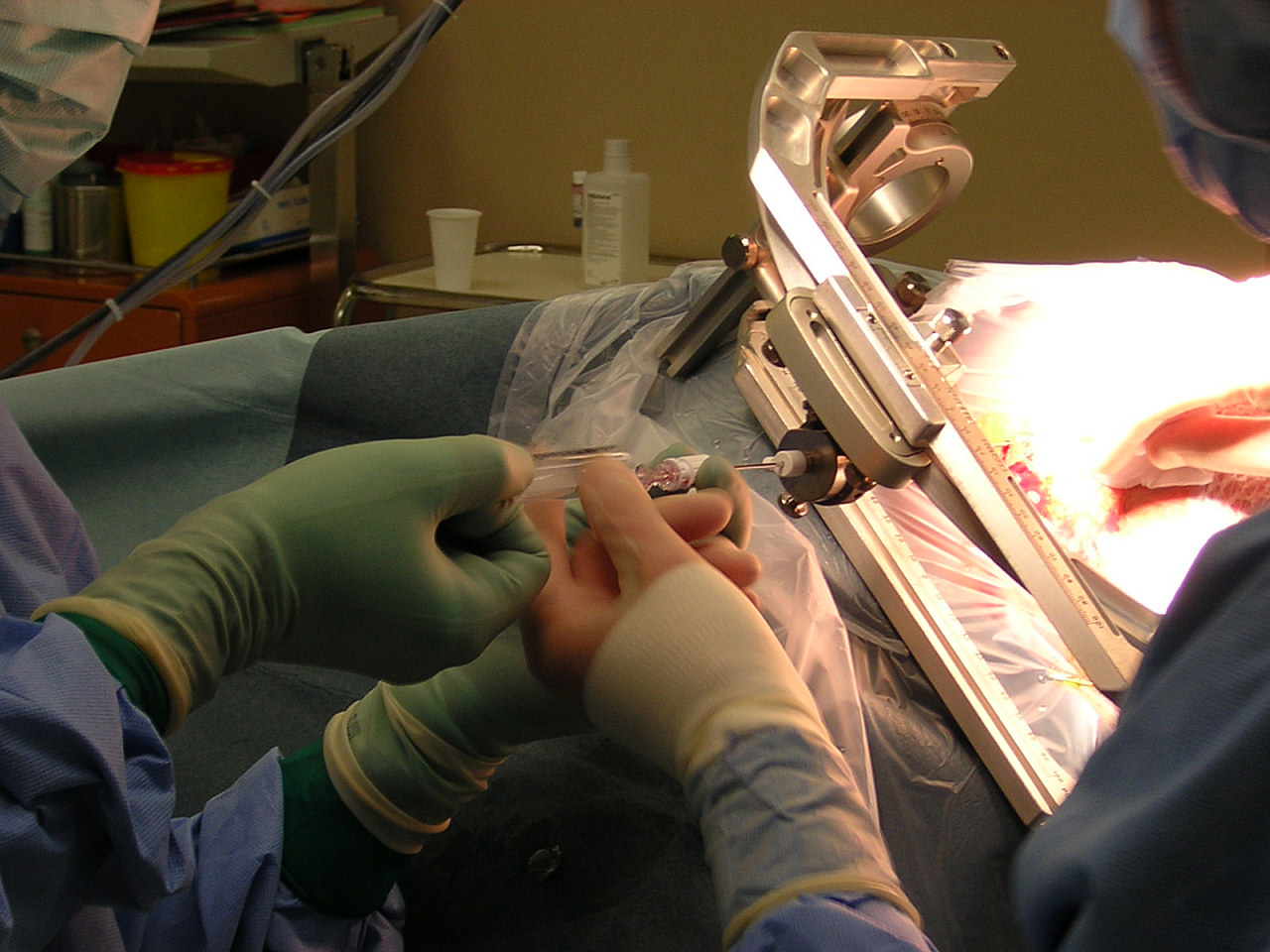
Brain biopsy under stereotaxy

Kalyanaraman, together with Ramamurthi and his other associates at Madras Medical College, formed a team of neurospecialists and promoted stereotactic surgery at the institution. They covered many neurological, behavioral and psychiatric disorders including Parkinson's disease, epilepsy and spasticity. Kalyanaraman, meanwhile, pioneered many streotactic innovations and the simultaneous use of two stereotactic equipment, viz. Leksell system and Sehgal system, to access two intracranial targets was one of his pioneering techniques which he performed in 1970. He established the location of pyramidal tract in the white matter structure of the cerebrum of the brain known as internal capsule, which assisted in the treatment of diseases such as Parkinsonism. The therapeutic systems popularized by Kalyanaraman and his associates later became known as the Madras School of Psychosurgery. He has documented his researches by way of several articles in per-reviewed journals (Note: Please see Selected bibliography section) and his work has been cited by a number of authors and researchers. Besides, he has contributed chapters to text books of Neurosurgery including Textbooks of Operative Neurosurgery, a 2-volume text published by his mentor, B. Ramamurthi.

Kalyanaraman is one of the founders of Madras Neuro Trust, a non-governmental organization promoting theoretical and clinical research in Neurology, was its founder treasurer, and serves as a member of its Board of Trustees. He organized the first Continuing medical education (CME) program in India in 1977 when he coordinated a CME program for the Neurological Society of India and was a member of the organizing committee of NSICON 2016 of the Neurological Society of India as well as the Neuro Update Chennai 2017, organized by Madras Neuro Trust in January 2017. He served as the convener of CME programs of Neurological Society of India from 1977 to 1984 and headed the Core Group for Educational promotion of NSI and National Board of Examinations in 2008. The professional positions held by him include the president-ships of Neurological Society of India in 1987 and Indian Society for Pediatric Neurosurgery during 1998–2000. He has also served as a visiting faculty at many universities in India and abroad and has delivered a number of keynote or invited lectures.

== Awards and honours ==
The Indian Academy of Sciences elected Kalyanaraman as their fellow in 1969 and the National Academy of Medical Sciences followed suit in 1971. The Council of Scientific and Industrial Research awarded him Shanti Swarup Bhatnagar Prize, one of the highest Indian science awards in 1969. He received the Acharya Seva Ratnam Award in 2003 and the Lifetime Achievement Award of the Madras Neuro Trust in 2007. The next three years brought him three more awards viz. Chetas Chikitsa Chintamani Award in 2008, Rotary For the Sake of Honor Award in 2009 and Param Acharya Award in 2010. Sri G. K. Subramaniya Iyer Award of 2012 and the Lifetime Achievement Award of the Kodambakkam chapter of the Indian Medical Association in 2013 are two other honors received by him. He is also a fellow of the Tamil Nadu Academy of Sciences and a member of Indian Cancer Society, International Medical Sciences Academy, International Society for Pediatric Neurosurgery, Society of British Neurological Surgeons, World Society for Stereotaxic and Functional Neurosurgery and Indian Association of Occupational Health. Madras Medical College has instituted an endowment, Dr S. Kalyanaraman Endowment, an annual oration, Dr S. Kalyanaraman Oration, and an award for academic excellence, Prof.S.Kalyanaraman Neurosurgery Prize for Neurosurgery post graduates, in his honour. The award orations delivered by him include the 2002 Jacob Chandy Oration of the Neurological Society of India, and IEA Tirupati Oration in Epileptology 2012,

== Selected bibliography ==
=== Chapters ===
- Ramamurthi; S. Kalyanaraman (chapter) (1 January 2005). "Traumatic Extradural and Subdural Hematomas". Textbooks of Operative Neurosurgery ( 2 Vol.). BI Publications Pvt Ltd. pp. 217–. ISBN 978-81-7225-217-5.
- Dr Kalyanaraman (chapter) (2012). Karthikeyan (ed.). Experience with Mahaperiyava.

=== Articles ===
- Balasubramaniam V, Ramamurthi B, Jagannathan K, Kalyanaraman S (1967). "Stereotaxic amygdalotomy". 1967. 15 (3): 119–22. PMID 4878498.
- Kalyanaraman S, Ramamurthi B (1969). "The pattern of head injury at Madras". Int Surg. 51 (6): 479–87. PMID 5788657.
- Kalyanaraman S, Ramanujam PB, Ramamurthi B (1970). "Cerebral abscess in patients with congenital cyanotic heart disease". Neurol India. 18 (a): 96–9. PMID 5508117.
- Kalyanaraman S, Ramamurthi B (1970). "Two machine stereotaxy". Neurol India. 18: 53–5. PMID 4927533.
- Ramamurthi B, Balasubramaniam V, Kalyanaraman S, Arjundas G, Jagannathan K (1970). "Stereotaxic ablation of the irritable focus in temporal lobe epilepsy". Confin Neurol. 32 (2): 316–21. doi:10.1159/000103432. PMID 4926193.
- Sarasa Bharati, R, Kalyanaraman, S. (1973). "Epidural spinal lymphoma in an infant". Journal of Neurosurgery. 39 (3): 412–15. doi:10.3171/jns.1973.39.3.0412. PMID 4741065.
- Bhargavi Ilangovan, Neetu Sasikumar, Janos Stump, Rathna Devi1, Murli Venkatraman, S. Kalyanaraman, Chendhilnathan (2017). "Four Cases of Hemangiopericytoma and the Contribution of Radiotherapy in Their Management". Indian Journal of Neurosurgery. 6 (published 2016): 020–026. doi:10.1055/s-0036-1582433.

== See also ==
- Lars Leksell
- Jacob Chandy
- Kurupath Radhakrishnan
