= Yobo =

Yobo is a surname. Notable people with the surname include:

- Joseph Yobo (born 1980), Nigerian footballer, brother of Albert
- Adaeze Yobo (born 1990), Nigerian socialite
- Albert Yobo (born 1979), Nigerian footballer

== See also ==
- Yoko (name)
