= Dipshikha Chakravortty =

Indian microbiologist and immunologist

- Born: Jabalpur, Madhya Pradesh, India
- Education: LAD College for Women; Rashtrasant Tukadoji Maharaj Nagpur University; National Centre for Cell Science; Savitribai Phule Pune University; Aichi Medical University; Friedrich-Alexander University
- Known for: Studies on Salmonella, antibacterial resistance
- Awards: 2010 N-BIOS Prize
- Scientific career
- Fields: Microbiology; Molecular pathology
- Workplaces: Indian Institute of Science
- Doctoral advisor: K. S. Nandakumar; U. V Wagh; Takashi Yokochi; Michael Hensel

Dipshikha Chakravortty is an Indian microbiologist, molecular pathologist and a professor at the department of Microbiology and Cell Biology at the Indian Institute of Science. Known for her studies on Salmonella and antibacterial resistance, Chakravortty is an elected fellow of The World Academy of Sciences (FTWAS), the National Academy of Sciences, India, the Indian Academy of Sciences and the Indian National Science Academy. The Department of Biotechnology of the Government of India awarded her the National Bioscience Award for Career Development, one of the highest Indian science awards, for her contributions to biosciences, in 2010.

== Biography ==
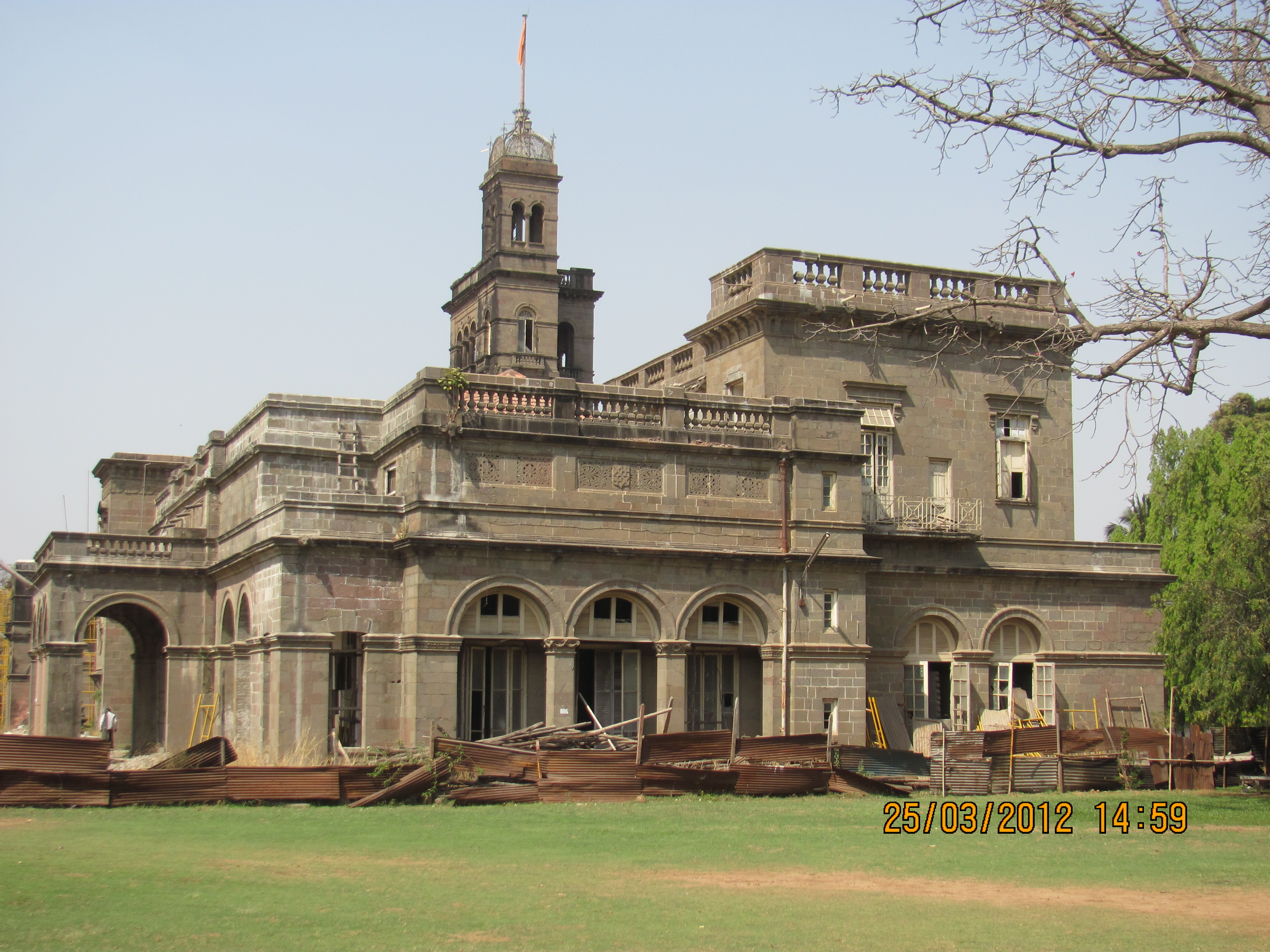
University of Pune

Dipshikha Chakravortty was born in 1968 at Jabalpur, in the second largest Indian state of Madhya Pradesh to Santosh Kumar Chakravortty and Bani Chakravortty. Her early schooling was in Mumbai where the family had moved soon after her birth. After earning a bachelor's degree in microbiology from LAD College for Women of Rashtrasant Tukadoji Maharaj Nagpur University, and a master's degree in microbiology from the University of Nagpur. She did her doctoral studies, assisted by junior and senior research fellowships, under the guidance of K. S. Nandakumar at the National Centre for Cell Science which secured her a Ph.D. from Savitribai Phule Pune University. Thereafter, she moved to Japan for her post-doctoral studies and completed it under the supervision of Takashi Yokochi of Aichi Medical University. Subsequently, she took up a research position at the laboratory of Michael Hensel in Erlangen, Germany, and worked there on an Alexander von Humboldt fellowship. On her return to India in 2004, she joined the Department of Microbiology and Cell Biology of the Indian Institute of Science (IISc) as a faculty, where she holds the position of a professor. At IISc, she has established her laboratory, Molecular Pathogenesis Lab and hosts a number of researchers and scholars.

Chakravortty resides at IISc Campus, in Bengaluru, Karnataka.

== Professional profile ==
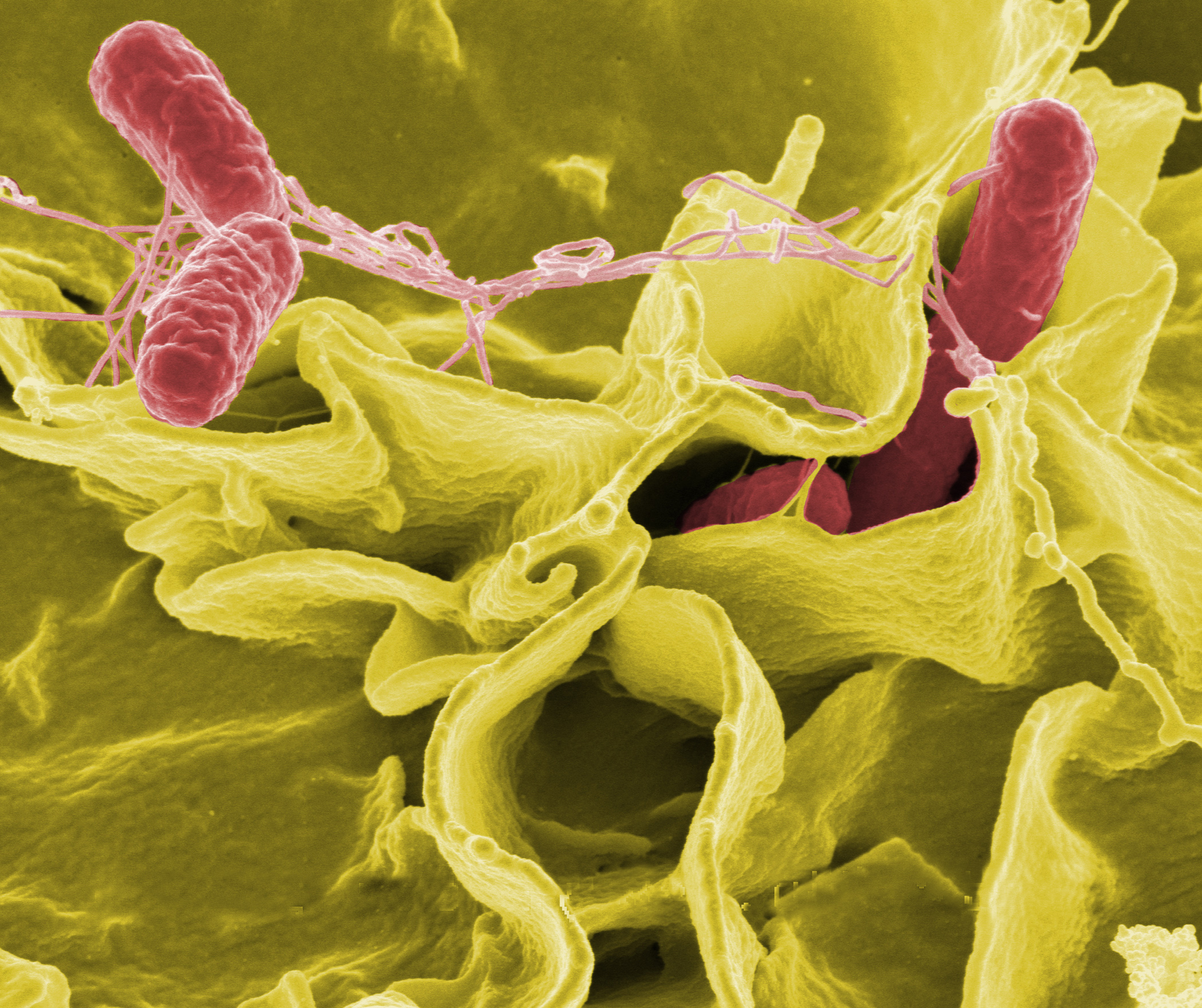
Salmonella.

Chakravortty's research focus is on antibacterial resistance with special emphasis on salmonella and she is known to have done work on the pathogenesis of Salmonella Typhimurium, a gram negative bacterium pathogen. Her laboratory works on diseases such as Typhoid, and the host-pathogen interaction with regard to the disease, with a view to develop a vaccine with a long-time memory against the pathogen. The team led by her has been successful in developing a treatment protocol for sepsis which uses a Bactericidal/permeability-increasing protein, a type of glycoprotein, which has been found to neutralize the bacterial endotoxin, one of the primary causative factors of sepsis. Her studies have been documented by way of a number of articles (Note: Please see Selected bibliography section) and ResearchGate, an online repository of scientific articles has listed 169 of them. Besides, she has contributed chapters to books edited by others. She has also mentored many research scholars in their doctoral studies.

== Awards and honors ==
Prof Dipshikha Chakravortty received the Tata Innovation Fellowship for 2020–21, for her overall research excellence. Prof. Chakravortty was also awarded the Yogmaya Devi Award in Biological/Medical Sciences, in recognition of significant research contributions in any branch of Biological/Medical Sciences for 2021. The Department of Biotechnology (DBT) of the Government of India awarded her the National Bioscience Award for Career Development, one of the highest Indian science awards in 2010. The National Academy of Sciences, India elected her as a fellow in 2012 and she became an elected fellow of the Indian National Science Academy in 2017. The Indian Academy of Sciences elected her as a fellow in 2021. She is also a recipient of Prof S. K. Chatterjee award of the Indian Institute of Science (2021), NASI-Reliance Platinum Jubilee Award (2015), DAE SRC Outstanding Investigator Award (2015), Alexander von Humboldt fellowship and was a member of the IISc Team that won gold medal at iGEM 2017 and iGEM 2018 contest, held in Boston.

== Selected bibliography ==
=== Chapters ===
- Riccardo Bonazza; Devesh Ranjan (10 July 2015). 29th International Symposium on Shock Waves 2. Springer. pp. 877–. ISBN 978-3-319-16838-8.

== See also ==
- Nanocarriers
- Drug delivery
