= Kurupath Radhakrishnan =

Indian neurologist (born 1948)

- Born: 15 June 1948 (age 78); Mathur, Palakkad district, Kerala, India
- Education: Calicut Medical College, Kerala; Postgraduate Institute of Medical Education and Research (PGIMER), Chandigarh; Mayo Clinic, Rochester, Minnesota, US
- Scientific career
- Fields: Epilepsy, neurology, neuroepidemiology
- Workplaces: Sree Chitra Tirunal Institute for Medical Sciences & Technology, Kerala, India; Manipal Academy of Higher Education, Manipal, Karnataka, India; Amrita Institute of Medical Sciences, Cochin, Kerala, India; Avitis Institute of Medical Sciences, Nemmara, Palakkad, Kerala, India
- Academic advisors: Jagjit Singh Chopra, Leonard Kurland, Donald Klass

Kurupath Radhakrishnan is an Indian neurologist and epileptologist, who has established R Madhavan Nayar Center for Comprehensive Epilepsy Care, (RMNC) at Sree Chitra Tirunal Institute of Medical Sciences and Technology (SCTIMST) Thiruvananthapuram, India. He has contributed for the resurgence of epilepsy surgery in India during 1990s, after the decline in 1970s. He also served as the director of SCTIMST from 2009 - 2013. After his retirement he worked at the Department of Neurology, Kasturba Medical College, Manipal Academy of Higher Education, Manipal, Karnataka, India; and at the Department of Neurology, Amrita Advanced Epilepsy Center, Amrita Institute of Medical Sciences, Cochin, Kerala, India. Currently he is working as a senior Consultant, Department of Neurosciences, Avitis Institute of Medical Sciences, Nemmara, Palakkad, Kerala, India.

== Early life, education, and clinical training ==
Radhakrishnan was born to late Dr. T Madhavan Nair and late Smt. Kunhilakshmi Amma as the second of the five children, at the Kurupath House in the village Mathur, Palakkad district, Kerala on 15 June 1948. He did his schooling in Government Secondary School at Kottayi, Palakkad and later studied pre-degree course (biology) at the Government Victoria College, Palakkad. He completed the MBBS course from the Government medical college Kozhikode, Kerala in 1971, where he won gold medals in physiology and medicine. He pursued his higher studies; MD (Internal Medicine) and DM (Neurology) from Postgraduate Institute of Medical Education and Research (PGIMER), Chandigarh in 1979. He was the first one to be awarded MNAMS (Neurology) by the National Academy of Medical Sciences, India in 1980.

== Career ==
He started his professional career in PGIMER, Chandigarh as a neurologist. Later he also worked as faculty at the Medical University, Benghazi, Libya, where he got interested in neuroepidemiology, which culminated in getting advanced training in neuroepidemiology under Leonard T. Kurland at Mayo Clinic, Rochester, Minnesota, USA, who is considered to be the father of neuroepidemiology. Subsequently, he also got trained in EEG and epilepsy from Donald Klass at the Mayo Clinic. He returned to India in 1994 as professor and head of the Department of Neurology at Sree Chitra Tirunal Institute for Medical Sciences and Technology, where he established R Madhavan Nayar Center for Comprehensive Epilepsy Care using philanthropic funding in 1998. This was one of the pioneering centers in India which contributed for the paradigm shift in comprehensive epilepsy management. The center was mainly involved in 1) medical, surgical, psychosocial and occupational management of individual patients with epilepsy; 2) educating the primary and secondary care physicians about the current trends in the management of epilepsy, and enhance public awareness about epilepsy in order to dispel the prevailing misconceptions; and 3) undertake clinical, applied and basic science research and evolve cost-effective investigative and treatment strategies. This center performs almost 100 epilepsy surgeries annually.

== Achievements ==
Prof. Radhakrishnan is a life member of the Neurological Society of India, Indian Academy of Neurology and Indian Epilepsy Association. He is a past president of the Indian Academy of Neurology. He is a Fellow of the National Academy of Medical Sciences India (FAMS), American Academy of Neurology (FAAN) and American Neurological Association (FANA). He was awarded the prestigious Mayo Clinical Award in 1994, and the ‘Outstanding Achievement Epilepsy Award’ at the Asian Ocean Epilepsy Congress (AOEC), March 2012. He has served in the editorial board of Epilepsia, Neurology India and Indian Academy of Neurology. Recently, he has been appointed as associate editor of Epilepsy and Behavior Case Reports. He has over 300 scientific publications, several book chapters, with more than 12,000 citations, h-index of 57 and i10-index of 174. He is also a recipient of the Lifetime Achievement Award of Madras Neuro Trust.
