= Baldev Singh (neurologist) =

Indian neurologist (1904–1998)

- Born: 6 April 1904
- Died: 2 February 1998 (aged 93)
- Other names: Grandfather neuron
- Occupations: Neurologist, professor
- Awards: Padma Bhushan (1972)

Baldev Singh (6 April 1904 – 2 February 1998) was an Indian neurologist. He was best known for collaborative works with neurologists Jacob Chandy, Balasubramaniam Ramamurthi and S. T. Narasimhan and together they have been credited to be pioneers in development of epilepsy surgery in India. They also helped in establishing the Neurological Society of India in 1951 at Madras (now Chennai). After training in the United States of America, he returned to India and established himself at Delhi. He was presented with the Padma Bhushan in 1972 for his contributions in the field of medicine.

== Works ==
Singh was born on 6 April 1904 in a well-to-do family. In school, he won various scholarships and further went to join the King Edward Medical College, Lahore in 1922 and graduated in 1927. He developed interest in neuroanatomy and later went to National Hospital at Queen Square in Central London. At the National Hospital, Singh was associated with various notable neurologists like Russell Brain, 1st Baron Brain and MacDonald Critchley. Singh returned to India in 1931 and set up his medical practice in a village near Amritsar. With study of Alpha wave, also called Berger's rhythm in memory of Hans Berger, Singh undertook a training in electronics. In the 1940s, he developed an apparatus to record the electrical activity of the brains of laboratory animals. In 1950, he moved to Chicago and studied epilepsy patients of neurologist Percival Bailey taking their EEGs.

The first department of neurology in India was established in 1949 by Jacob Chandy at the Christian Medical College of Vellore in the Madras State (now Tamil Nadu). Singh was unable to find suitable job at Amritsar or Delhi and he hence joined Chandy in 1950. Singh's work with Bailey helped him organize a surgery program at Vellore for epilepsy. On 25 August 1952, Chandy performed the first surgery in India on a 19-year-old boy suffering with infantile right hemiplegia. Singh supervised the EEG records of the patient during the surgery.

In 1950, Balasubramaniam Ramamurthi started the neurological department at the Madras General Hospital where S. T. Narasimhan was also associated. Ramamurthi performed his first surgery in epilepsy in 1954 and Narasimhan helped with EEG recording. Singh, Chandy, Ramamurthi and Narasimhan have been credited for pioneering the epilepsy surgery in India. They also established the Neurological Society of India in 1951. Until then, all the disciples of neurology were not associated together as the field was still in an emerging state post independence of India in 1947.

Singh headed the newly inaugurated neurological department at the Tirath Ram Shah Hospital, New Delhi in 1954. He also taught at the Lady Hardinge Medical College and Willingdon Hospital (now called Ram Manohar Lohia Hospital) in Delhi. In 1964, as Singh was beyond his retirement age, he was invited for three years to help in establishing the Department of Neurology and Neurosurgery at the All India Institute of Medical Sciences Delhi (AIIMS). He was also an Emeritus Professor at the Department of Physiology at AIIMS. In 1972, the Government of India presented him with the Padma Bhushan award, the third-highest civilian award, for his work in the field of medicine. He died on 2 February 1998 and was popularly called "grandfather neuron".
