= Yoko (name) =

- Gender: Female
- Language: Japanese

Origin
- Meaning: See text
- Region of origin: Japan

Other names
- Variant form: See text
- Related names: Yōko, Yōkō

Yoko and Yōko (ヨウコ, ようこ) are Japanese feminine given names. Yōko is sometimes transliterated as Yohko and Youko.

The name Yoko is almost always written with the kanji 子 (ko), meaning "child". The syllable ko is not generally found at the end of masculine names.

In Japanese, Yoko and Yōko have numerous orthographical variations. Some of the meanings of the kanji used to write it are:

- 瑛子, "crystal, sparkle of jewelry, child"
- 陽子, "sunshine, child", "sunny, child"
- 洋子, "ocean, child"
- 遥子, "long ago, child"
- 楊子, "willow, child"
- 瑶子, "beautiful, child"
- 謡子, "noh (Japanese word for skill or talent), child"
- 八子, "eight, child"
- 羊子, "sheep, child"
- 要子, "vital, need, child"
- 暢子, "free, child"
- 容子, "glorious, child"
- 妖子, "bewitch, child"
- 葉子, "leaf, child"
- 曜子, "weekday, child"

The masculine name Yōkō, as in the given name of pro boxer Yoko Gushiken (具志堅 用高), is transliterated similarly, but in Japanese it is written and pronounced differently. A family name, Yokoo, as in Yoko Taro (横尾 太郎), also exists.

== People ==
- Yoko Akino (暢子, born 1957), Japanese actress
- Yōko Asada (葉子, born 1969), Japanese voice actress
- Yōko Fukazawa (深澤 洋子; born 1967), Japanese speed skater
- Yoko Hayashi (林 陽子; born 1956), Japanese lawyer
- Yoko Hikasa (陽子, born 1985), Japanese voice actress
- Yōko Honna (陽子 born 1979), Japanese voice actress
- Yoko Ishida (born 1973), Japanese singer
- Yōko Ishino (ようこ born 1968), Japanese actress and tarento
- Yoko Kagabu (利部 陽子; born 1960), Japanese volleyball player
- Yoko Kamio (葉子, born 1966), manga artist popular for her manga Boys Over Flowers
- Yoko Kando (陽子, born 1974), Japanese butterfly swimmer
- Yoko Kanno (よう子, born 1963), Japanese composer, arranger and music producer
- Yoko Kato (born 1952), Japanese neurosurgeon
- Yoko Koikawa (born 1974), Japanese backstroke swimmer
- Yoko Kumada (熊田 曜子, born 1982), Japanese gravure idol and singer
- Yōko Maki (actress) (よう子, born 1982), Japanese actress
- Yōko Maki (manga artist) (ようこ, born 1981), Japanese Manga artist
- Yōko Matsuoka (松岡洋子, born 1954), Japanese voice actress
- Yoko Matsuyama (松山容子, born 1937), Japanese actress
- Yoko Minamida (南田 洋子, 1933–2009), a Japanese actress
- Yoko Minamino (陽子, born 1967), Japanese actress and singer
- Yoko Mori (瑤子, 1940–1993), Japanese novelist
- Yoko Moriguchi (瑤子, born 1966), Japanese actress
- Yōko Nagayama (洋子, born 1968), Japanese enka singer and actress
- Yōko Natsuki (陽子, born 1952), Japanese actress
- Yōko Nogiwa (陽子, born 1936), Japanese actress
- Yoko Ono (洋子, born 1933), Japanese musician-artist and widow of John Lennon. She now writes her name in katakana (オノ・ヨーコ/Ono Yōko)
- Yoko Ono (judoka) (大野 陽子; born 1989), Japanese judoka
- Yoko Sakaue (坂上, born 1968), Japanese judoka
- Yōko Sasaki (佐々木 瑶子; born 1975), Japanese voice actress and actress
- Yoko Shibui (陽子, born 1979), Japanese long-distance runner
- Yoko Shimada (楊子, 1953–2022), Japanese actress
- Yoko Shimomura (陽子, born 1967), Japanese composer and musician
- Yoko Shindo (真道 洋子, 1960–2018), Japanese archaeologist
- Yōko Shōgenji (陽子, born 2007), Japanese singer
- Yōko Sōmi (陽子, born 1965), Japanese voice actress
- Yoko Takahashi (洋子, born 1966), Japanese singer, performed "Cruel Angel's Thesis" opening for Neon Genesis Evangelion
- Yoko Tanabe (陽子, born 1966), Japanese judoka
- Yoko Tanaka (田中 陽; born 1993), Japanese women's footballer
- Yoko Tawada (葉子, born 1960), Japanese writer
- Yoko Toyonaga (born 1977), Japanese shot putter
- Yoko Wanibuchi (洋子, born 1972), Japanese politician
- Yoko Watanabe (葉子, 1953–2004), Japanese operatic soprano
- Yoko Kawashima Watkins
- Yoko Yamada (山田 よう子; born 1979), Japanese mixed martial artist
- Yoko Yamaguchi (山口 洋子; 1937–2014), Japanese lyricist and writer
- Yoko Yamamoto (山本 陽子; born 1942), Japanese actress
- Yoko Yamamoto (swimmer) (山本 容子; born 1958), Japanese swimmer
- Yôko Yamanaka (山中 瑶子; born 1997) Japanese filmmaker

== Fictional characters ==
- Yoko Akimoku, a character from manga and anime Biriken
- Yoko Belnades, a supporting character in the Castlevania series
- Yoko Harmageddon, from the Street Fighter video game series
- Yoko Herene, a character in My-Otome
- Yoko Inukai, a character in Wonderful Pretty Cure!
- Yoko Inokuma, a character in Kin-iro Mosaic
- Yoko Katagiri, a character in Kidou Keiji Jiban
- Yoko Katou, a character in the Himitsu Sentai Gorenger television series
- Yoko Kuno, a character in All About Lily Chou-Chou
- Yoko Kurama, a form of the character Kurama in the animated series YuYu Hakusho
- Yoko Littner, one of the main characters of Tengen Toppa Gurren Lagann
- Yoko Machi, a character in Bokurano: Ours manga series
- Yoko Matsutani, a character in Legendz
- Yohko Mano, the title character of Devil Hunter Yohko
- Yoko Minato, a character in Kamen Rider Gaim
- Yoko Nakajima, a character in The Twelve Kingdoms
- Yoko Nakashima, a character in Ultraman Z
- Yoko Okino, a minor character in Detective Conan
- Yoko Omori, a character in HappinessCharge Pretty Cure!
- Yōko Ozawa, a character in Love Exposure
- Yoko Tsuno (character), the title character of the Yoko Tsuno comic book series created by Belgian writer Roger Leloup.
- Yoko Suzuki, a character in the Resident Evil series
- Yoko Shiragami, the female main protagonist of My Monster Secret
- Yoko Usami, a main character in Tokumei Sentai Go-Busters
- Yoko, a non-playable Mii opponent in the Wii series
- Yoko, a character in Inukami!
- Yoko, a character in the 2004 film The Grudge
- Yoko, the birth name of the main character in the manga Gunnm
- Yoko, protagonist of Yoko! Jakamoko! Toto! (2003), a British animated series for children
- Yoko, a character in Timothy Goes to School, a preschool children's animated television series
