= Ayiloor Gram Panchayat =

Gram Panchayat in Palakkad district of Kerala, India

Coordinates: 10°32′48″N 76°34′28″E

Ayiloor is a gram panchayat in the Palakkad district, state of Kerala, India. It is a local government organisation that serves the villages of Ayiloor, Kairady and Thiruvazhiyad.
