= S. T. Narasimhan =

S. T. Narasimhan (1913 – 1959) was an Indian electrophysiologist. He started the first Electroencephalography (EEG) laboratory in India at Madras (now Chennai) in 1950. He was best known for collaborative works with neurologists Jacob Chandy, Balasubramaniam Ramamurthi and Baldev Singh and together they have been credited to be pioneers in development of epilepsy surgery in India. They also helped in establishing the Neurological Society of India in 1951 at Madras.

== Life ==
Not much is known about the life of Narasimhan; but Balasubramaniam Ramamurthi's biography Uphill All The Way gives some details. Narasimhan was born in 1913, and around 1945 he sold his medical practice in India so he could go to the United States of America to further his studies. He was a General Surgeon and at the Neurological Institute of New York he trained in neurology and neurosurgery. He returned to India in 1948 and started his private practice setting up a neurosurgical nursing home and EEG laboratory and stayed in the residential areas of Kilpauk, Chennai.

Dr. Balasubramaniam had set up the Department of Neurosurgery at the Government General Hospital, Chennai in 1950 and Narasimhan joined him as an honorary assistant surgeon. During the pioneering days, X-rays and EEG were used in diagnosis as angiography was not yet available in India. During the neurosurgical procedures that Balasubramaniam under took, Narasimhan assisted him in EEG service and in later patient care. Narasimhan earned around ₹30 (equivalent to about ₹3,170 in 2023) for each procedure from the then Government of Madras. In 1951, Singh, Chandy, Ramamurthi and Narasimhan established the Neurological Society of India and together find credit as pioneers of epilepsy surgery in India.

In 1959, Narasimhan became the Honorary Professor of Electroencephalography. The same year, he died at an early age of 46 at Bangalore of unknown reasons.
