= T. S. Kanaka =

Neurosurgeon

Thanjavur Santhanakrishna Kanaka
- Born: 31 March 1932; Chennai
- Died: 14 November 2018 (aged 86); Chennai
- Other names: Tanjore Santhana Krishna Kanaka; Kanaka Santhanakrishna
- Education: Madras Medical College
- Occupation: Neurosurgeon
- Known for: Asia's first female neurosurgeon

T. S. Kanaka or Thanjavur Santhanakrishna Kanaka, also known as Tanjore Santhana Krishna Kanaka, (31 March 1932 – 14 November 2018) was Asia's first female neurosurgeon and one of the world's first few female neurosurgeons. She was the first neurosurgeon in India to perform chronic electrode implants in the brain, having been also the first to perform deep brain stimulation as early as in 1975. She pioneered functional neurosurgery in the 1960s and 1970s along with Prof. Balasubramaniam, Prof. S. Kalyanaraman; and received recognition for her research and contributions to the field of stereotactic surgery. She is also a recipient of the Lifetime Achievement Award of Madras Neuro Trust.

== Early life and education ==
Thanjavur Santhanakrishna Kanaka was one of eight children born to Santhanakrishna and Padmavathi in Madras. Her father was the deputy director of Public Instruction and principal of Madras Teachers College. Early on, Kanaka was drawn to spiritual studies, but despite her interest went on to study medicine, completing her Bachelor of Medicine (MBBS) in December 1954 and achieving her Master of Surgery (MS) in general surgery in March 1963. In 1968, she obtained her Master of Surgery (MCh) in neurosurgery and later completed a PhD in the Evaluation of Stereotatic surgery in Cerebral Palsy in 1972. After over 20 years of surgery, Kanaka went back to school and obtained her Diploma in Higher Education (DHEd) in 1983.

== Career ==
Kanaka was one of the world's first female neurosurgeons; having qualified with a degree (MCh) in Neurosurgery in March 1968; after Diana Beck (1902-1956), and Aysima Altinok who qualified in November 1959. When stereotaxy started in Madras in 1960, Kanaka was a member of B.Ramamurthi's surgical team that performed the first stereotaxic procedures in India.

Kanaka served in the Indian Army as a commissioned officer during the 1962-1963 Sino-Indian War. She was predominantly associated for most of her career with the Government General Hospital. Kanaka also taught at the Madras Medical College, Epidemiological Research Centre, Adyar Cancer Institute, Hindu Mission Hospital and other hospitals. She worked with several organisations to aid provision of healthcare to economically disadvantaged people, including Tirumala Tirupati Devasthanams TTD (Tirumala) for over 30 years.

In 1973, she began an international travel stint, first traveling to Tokyo, Japan, which was one of three places in the world where stereotaxic procedures were performed. During this time, Kanaka completed a one-year Colombo Plan Fellowship, where she studied phrenic nerve stimulation and biomedical devices, including those for pain management and diaphragmatic pacing.

Kanaka retired as a surgeon in 1990, but continued to offer consultancy services and refused to descend into private practice. In 1996, Kanaka became the Honorary President of the Asian Women's Neurosurgical Association. At that time she was formally acknowledged as Asia's first female neurosurgeon. She used her own funds to establish a hospital, named after her parents as the Sri Santhanakrishna Padmavathi Health Care and Research Foundation, which offers free healthcare to the needy.

== Personal life ==
After Kanaka successfully obtained her MS degree, her younger brother became ill and died at the age of nine. This tragedy influenced Kanaka's decision to remain unmarried and instead pursue a career in medicine to dedicate her life to helping patients.

Kanaka also faced much discrimination as a pioneering woman in a male-dominated field, as program leaders in her MS program were untrusting of her medical capabilities, often not choosing Kanaka for surgical procedures and limiting the cases she worked in the ER. When taking her examinations, Kanaka had to appear multiple times before she was taken seriously.

Kanaka was formerly listed in the Limca Book of Records for the highest number of blood donations by an individual. As of 2004 she was noted to have donated blood 139 times.

== Death and legacy ==
Kanaka died in Chennai on 14 November 2018.

== Selected publications ==
- Kanaka, T. S.; Ramamurthi, B. (1967). "Management of depressed fractures of the skull". Neurology India. 15 (1): 10–11. ISSN 0028-3886. PMID 6061471.
- Kanaka, T. S.; Balasubramaniam, V. (1978). "Stereotactic cingulumotomy for drug addiction". Applied Neurophysiology. 41 (1–4): 86–92. doi:10.1159/000102404. ISSN 0302-2773. PMID 365103.
- Kanaka, T. S.; Kumar, M. M. (July 1990). "Neural stimulation for spinal spasticity". Paraplegia. 28 (6): 399–405. doi:10.1038/sc.1990.53. ISSN 0031-1758. PMID 2235051.
- Kanaka, T. S. (2016). "Back to the future: Glimpses into the past". Neurol India. 64 (2): 206–7. doi:10.4103/0028-3886.177594. PMID 26954792.

== See also ==
- Yoko Kato
