= Kate Hermann =

Neurology consultant

- Born: 1903/1904; German Empire
- Died: 2007; Edinburgh, Scotland, UK

Kate Hermann (1903–2007) was the first female neurology consultant in Scotland. In 1937 Hermann, who was Jewish, went with her family, including her younger sister Gerda, from Hamburg to London, fleeing the Nazis. In 1938 she moved to Edinburgh to study at the Royal Infirmary under Professor Norman Dott.

In 1943, Hermann was the senior clinical assistant at the neurosurgical department of the Royal Infirmary of Edinburgh and she also worked at the Neurological Brain Injuries Unit in the former Emergency Military Services Hospital in Bangour, West Lothian. She retired from medicine in September 1969.

Hermann resided in Newington and The Grange while in Edinburgh. She had moved to Colinton Care Home in Spylaw Road, Merchiston in 2002 and died there in 2007.

The Scottish Jewish Heritage Centre created public displays on the experience of Jewish refugees who came to Scotland before, during and after World War 2 in the Scottish Holocaust-era Study Centre, and also looks at the contribution they made to Scottish society. This includes the contribution of Kate Hermann.

== Works ==
- Hermann, K; Macgregor, AR (1940). "Cerebral Haemorrhage from Rupture of Congenital Intracerebral Aneurysm in a Child". Br Med J. 1: 523–538.3. doi:10.1136/bmj.1.4134.523. PMC 2176781. PMID 20783025..
- Hermann, K (1952). "Pituitary exophthalmos; an assessment of methods of treatment". Br J Ophthalmol. 36: 1–19. doi:10.1136/bjo.36.1.1. PMC 1323828. PMID 14895851..
