= C. Kesavadas =

Indian radiologist

- Born: Kerala, India
- Education: University of Calicut
- Known for: Studies on medical imaging
- Awards: 2009 N-BIOS Prize
- Scientific career
- Fields: Radiology
- Workplaces: Sree Chitra Tirunal Institute for Medical Sciences and Technology

Chandrasekharan Kesavadas is an Indian radiologist and a professor of radiology at the Sree Chitra Tirunal Institute for Medical Sciences and Technology. His research focus in the fields of magnetic resonance imaging, neuroradiology medical imaging informatics and brain Computer interface. He led a team of scientists who developed an imaging protocol for scanning intractable epilepsy, a computational software for detecting cortical dysplasia and novel neuroimaging systems for weighted imaging of brain cancer. His studies have been documented by way of a number of articles (Note: Please see Selected bibliography section) and ResearchGate, an online repository of scientific articles has listed 275 of them. The Department of Biotechnology of the Government of India awarded him the National Bioscience Award for Career Development, one of the highest Indian science awards, for his contributions to biosciences, in 2009. The award orations delivered by him include the 2010 edition of the M. N. Sen Oration of the Indian Council of Medical Research.

== Selected bibliography ==
- Vijayakumari, Anupa A.; Thomas, Bejoy; Menon, Ramshekhar N.; Kesavadas, Chandrasekharan (17 January 2018). "Task-based metabolic changes in the left dorsolateral prefrontal region during the letter N-back working memory task using proton magnetic resonance spectroscopy". NeuroReport. 29 (2): 147–152. doi:10.1097/wnr.0000000000000943. ISSN 0959-4965. PMID 29215468. S2CID 19585462.
- Sheelakumari, Raghavan; Rajagopalan, Venkateswaran; Chandran, Anuvitha; Varghese, Tinu; Zhang, Luduan; Yue, Guang H.; Mathuranath, Pavagadha S.; Kesavadas, Chandrasekharan (30 October 2017). "Quantitative analysis of grey matter degeneration in FTD patients using fractal dimension analysis". Brain Imaging and Behavior. 12 (5): 1221–1228. doi:10.1007/s11682-017-9784-x. ISSN 1931-7557. PMID 29086152. S2CID 24165105.
- Hingwala, DivyataR; Chandrasekhakan, Kesavadas; Thomas, Bejoy; Sylaja, PN; Unnikrishnan, M; Kapilamoorthy, TR (1 October 2017). "Atherosclerotic carotid plaques: Multimodality imaging with contrast-enhanced ultrasound, computed tomography, and magnetic resonance imaging". Annals of Indian Academy of Neurology. 20 (4): 378–386. doi:10.4103/aian.aian_122_17. PMC 5682742. PMID 29184341.
