= Thiruvazhiyad =

- village
- Country: India
- State: Kerala
- District: Palakkad

Population (2011)
  - Total: 10,794

Languages
  - Official: Malayalam, English
- Time zone: UTC+5:30 (IST)
- PIN: 678510
- Vehicle registration: KL-

Thiruvazhiyad is a village in Palakkad district in the state of Kerala, India. It forms a part of the Ayiloor gram panchayat.

== Demographics ==
As of 2011 India census, Thiruvazhiyad had a population of 10794 with 5266 males and 5528 females. The village is surrounded by paddy fields. The adjacent Ayila Mudichchi or Akhila Mudichchi hill appeal to the people of the village which initiate high range region of the area that extends up to the famous Nelliampathy hills of Palakkad District.

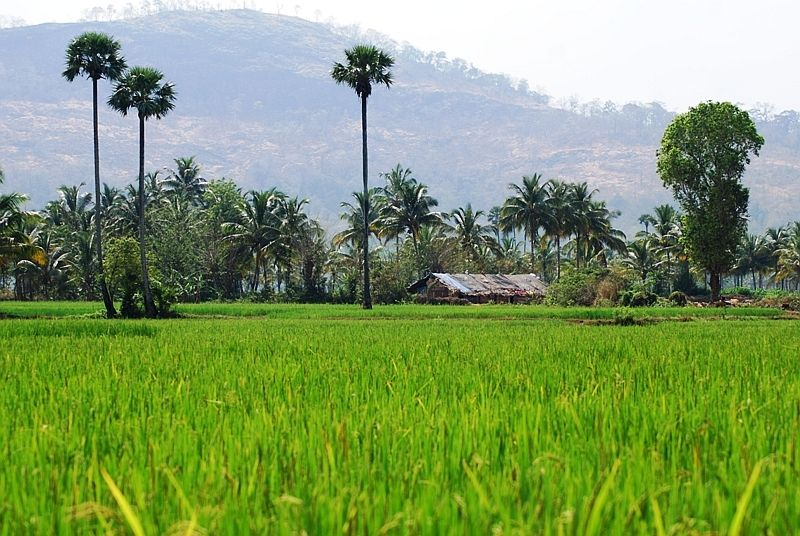
Palm trees (Washingtonia filifera) and Paddy fields in Thiravazhiyad village

== Narasimhamoorthy Temple ==
Thiruvazhiyad Narasimha Murthi Temple is known as some of the rare temple of the deity. It is a well known ancient temple situated about 5 km from Nemmara, Palghat district. The temple has one main sanatorium which is dedicated to Lord Narasimha Murthy.

Lord Narasimha Murthy, the fourth embodiment of Lord Vishnu, is seen in a fierce form. Separate niches are earmarked for the deities of Lord Shiva, Pazhayannur Bagavathi Lord Ganesh, (Lord Ayyappa - Recent not at the time of construction) and Goddess Durga. Every Year 7 days during the month of May, Festivals (Aarattu Utstavam) being celebrated by local committee under the Cochin Devasom Board. From the older days the Utsavam was celebrated with lot of enthusiasm. Three elephant procession, Kootiyattom, Kathakali, Ottan Thullal and Chakyarkoothu during after noon and evening and food for everybody.

== Thiruvazhiyad Koothabhishekam Vela ==
This festival is another major attraction which is held in a nearby Kozhikkadi bhagavati temple, celebrated amid much ceremony and splendor, attracts thousands of devotees from far and near. The place is known famous for its Kanyar kali. Though this festival is essentially that of the Nair community, there is contribution and participation from all other communities in these celebrations. The traditional dances start on the auspicious day of Vishu, the first day of the month of Medam according to the Malayalam calendar.
