= Jacob Chandy =

Indian neurosurgeon

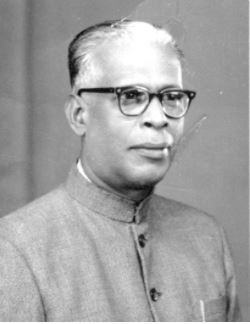
- Dr. Jacob Chandy in 1960
- Born: 23 January 1910; India
- Died: 23 June 2007 (aged 97)
- Occupations: Neurosurgeon, professor
- Spouse: Accamma
- Children: Mathew Jacob, Varghese Jacob, Accamma
- Awards: Padmabhushan; MNI Fellow; Medal of Honour by the World Congress of Neurological Surgeons; Professor Emiratus of the Government of Kerala

Jacob Chandy (23 January 1910 – 23 June 2007) was an Indian neurosurgeon and teacher of medical sciences. As the first neurosurgeon in India, he is widely regarded as the father of modern neurosurgery in India. In 1964, the Government of India honoured him with their third highest civilian award, Padmabhushan, for his services in the fields of neurosurgery and medical education.

== Biography ==
"To free your teachers to teach", Alan Gregg, the renowned medical educationist advised Jacob Chandy, "to free your students to learn, to create opportunities for your researchers to solve the medical problems of India, and above all to consider the needs of the near and oncoming future"

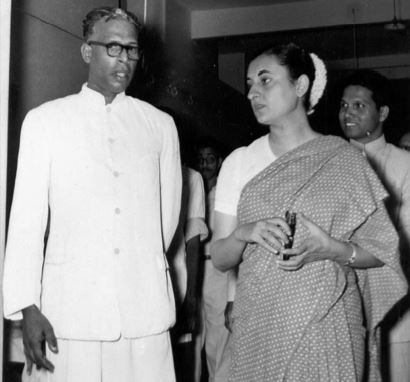
Dr. Jacob Chandy with Indira Gandhi (later Prime Minister of India), on her visit to C.M.C, Vellore, in 1958

Jacob Chandy was born on 23 January 1910, in Kottayam, in the south Indian state of Kerala to an Anglican Syrian Christian family. After his early education in Kottayam, he secured his graduate degree, an MBBS in medicine, from Madras Medical College in 1936. He kickstarted his career in 1939 by joining the Mission Hospital in Bahrain, a missionary hospital run by the American Reformed Church, where he stayed until 1944, when he took a hiatus from his practice to complete his MD at the University of Pennsylvania; while there he learned surgery under the guidance of Jonathan Rhoads. In 1945, he received a fellowship from the Montreal Neurological Institute (MNI) and continued to practice surgery till 1948.

After obtaining a fellowship from the Royal College of Surgeons, Canada (FRCS), also in 1948, Chandy moved to Chicago to take up duties as the chief resident at the University of Chicago. It was during this time that Chandy was invited by Robert Greenhill Cochrane, medical missionary and Leprologist, to join the Christian Medical College, Vellore (CMC), a fledgling medical college at that time.

Chandy started the Department of Neurology and Neurosurgery at CMC, the first of its kind in the country, in 1949. Eight years later, in 1958, CMC started the first training program in India for neurosurgery, followed by a program in neurology in 1962, under Chandy's guidance. Over the years, Chandy helped develop the neurology program into one of the most sought after courses in India. During his association with CMC, Chandy held various posts such as the professor of neurology and neurosurgery and the medical superintendent; he was the principal when he retired in 1970.

Chandy died on 23 June 2007, leaving behind his wife, Accamma, a daughter, also named Accamma, and two sons, Mathew and Varghese, the former a neurosurgeon and MNI fellow, and the latter, a chemical engineer.

== Legacy ==
Chandy's legacy lives through the numerous practitioners of neurosurgery who have contributed their services to the development of neurosurgery in India. He assisted many medical practitioners to get advanced training at the Montreal Neurological Institute, such as J. C. Jacob and G. M. Taori in neurology, Sushil Chandi in neuropathology, and Elizabeth Mammen and S. Sarojini in neurosurgical nursing. He was instrumental in promoting the biochemist, Bimal Kumar Bachhawat, who founded the neurochemistry laboratory, which identified the enzymopathy of metachromatic leucodystrophy, in collaboration with James H. Austin.

Chandy was the first of the first generation of neurologists, neurosurgeons and neuroscientists. He founded the Neurological Society of India in 1951, along with B. Ramamurthi, Baldev Singh and S. T. Narasimhan. He was the first surgeon in India to perform an epilepsy surgery on 25 August 1952, on a patient suffering from right infantile hemiplegia and medially refractory seizures.

== Awards and recognitions ==
Chandy was honoured by several institutions, organisations, and governmental bodies during his career.

- Professor emeritus of the Government of Kerala – 1970
- Padmabhushan – 1964
- Medal of Honour by the World Congress of Neurological Surgeons – 1989
- Founder and president of the Neurological Society of India
- Member – Medical Education Committee of the Ministry of Health, the All India Institute of Medical Sciences
- Member – Medical Education Committee of the Indian Council of Medical Research
- Montreal Neurological Institute (MNI) Fellow
- He was also the founding member of many neurology related societies in India.

== Autobiography ==
After his retirement from active practice, Chandy wrote his autobiography in 1988, titled Reminiscences and Reflections, with several anecdotes from his professional and personal life.
