= Neurology India =

- Discipline: Neurology
- Language: English

Publication details
- History: 1953–present
- Publisher: Medknow Publications (India)
- Frequency: Bimonthly
- Impact factor: 0.8 (2024)

Standard abbreviations
- ISO 4: Neurol. India

Indexing
- CODEN: NURYAY
- ISSN: 0028-3886 (print); 1998-4022 (web)
- LCCN: sv88075598
- OCLC no.: 06401325

Links
- Journal homepage

Neurology India is a bimonthly peer-reviewed open-access medical journal published by Medknow Publications on behalf of the Neurological Society of India.

The journal was started in the 1950s. It covers all aspects of neurology, including neurosurgery, neuropsychiatry, neuropathology, neuro-oncology, and neuro-pharmaceutics.

== Abstracting and indexing ==
The journal is abstracted and indexed in:

- Abstracts on Hygiene and Communicable Diseases
- CAB Abstracts
- CINAHL
- EBSCO databases
- Embase
- Global Health
- MEDLINE/Index Medicus
- ProQuest databases
- Science Citation Index Expanded
- Scopus
- Tropical Diseases Bulletin

According to the Journal Citation Reports, the journal has a 2024 impact factor of 0.8.
