= V. Ramankutty =

Indian health economist and epidemiologist

V. Ramankutty (also known as V. Raman Kutty) is an Indian health economist, and epidemiologist, currently research director of Amala Cancer Research Centre, Amala Institute of Medical Sciences, Thrissur and an emeritus professor at the Sree Chitra Tirunal Institute for Medical Sciences and Technology. He is the son of former chief minister of Kerala, C. Achutha Menon.

== Education ==
- M.B.B.S. (Bachelor of Medicine and Bachelor of Surgery); Kerala University, Thiruvananthapuram; 1976
- PGDCH (Post Graduate Diploma in Child Health); Kerala University, Thiruvananthapuram; 1980
- M. D. (Doctor of Medicine-Pediatrics); Kerala University, Thiruvananthapuram; 1983
- M. Phil. (Master of Philosophy, Applied Economics); Jawaharlal Nehru University, New Delhi; 1987
- M.P.H. (Master of Public Health); Harvard T.H. Chan School of Public Health, Cambridge, Massachusetts; 1988

== Career ==
Upon receiving his 1983 MD in pediatrics, Ramankutty became Consultant Pediatrician in Archana Hospital, Thodupuzha in 1983 and later joined the department of Pediatrics in Government Medical College, Thrissur as Tutor. He then obtained a Master of Philosophy ( 1987) from Jawaharlal Nehru University, and a Master of Public health M.P.H. (1988) from Harvard University,

He joined AMCHSS, Sree Chitra Tirunal Institute for Medical Sciences and Technology as a research scientist in 1988 and was promoted to scientist D SCTIMST in 1993. He then left SCTIMST in 1997 where he worked as an associate professor from 1994. He joined Health Action by People in Thiruvananthapuram in 1997 as executive director. From 2002 to 2003 he worked as a Domain Expert (Health) in Fiscal Reforms Project, Government of Kerala.

He returned to academics and joined as a professor in St Johns Institute of Population Health, Bengaluru in 2003. After a year he became domain expert and consultant, Modernising Government Programme (Project of Government of Kerala) (2004 to 2006); he was then an independent consultant for one year (2006–2007) in SOMA after which he rejoined AMCHSS SCTIMST, Trivandrum as a professor ad stayed until retirement.

Ramankutty officially retired as a professor from Achuta Menon Centre for Health Science Studies, SCTIMST on 31 December 2018. He was then elevated to the status of emeritus professor'.

== Publication ==
His most cited publications, according to Google Scholar are:

1. Bhandari TR, Womena??s Autonomy and Its Correlates in Western Nepal: A Demographic Study, PLoS ONE, 2016, 11,

2. Vinitha A, . PPIA rs6850: A>G single nucleotide polymorphism is associated with raised plasma cyclophylin A levels in patients with coronary artery disease, Mol Cell Biochem, 2016, 412(1,2):259–68

3. Dagenais GR, Gerstein HC, Zhang X et al. (including, Variations in Diabetes prevalence in Low-, Middle- and High-Income Countries: Results from the Prospective Urban Rural Epidemiology Study, Diabetes Care, 2016, 39,5:780–7

4. James T, V Raman Kutty, Jennifer Boyd, Patrick Brzoska, Validation of the Malayalam version of the Internalised Stigma of Mental Illness inventory, Asian Journal of Psychiatry, 2016, 20:22–9

5. Joseph M Pappachan, Diana Raskauskiene, Excess mortality associated with hypopituitarism in adults: a meta-analysis of observational studies, J Clin Endocrinol Metab, 2015, 100(4):1405a??1411

6. A Rosengren, K Theo, S Rangarajan et al. (including, Psychosocial factors and obesity in 17 high-, middle-, and low-income countries: The Prospective Urban Epidemiological (PURE) study, International Journal of Obesity, 2015, doi: 10.1038/ijo.2015.48

7. Anand TN, Development and testing of a scale to measure trust in public health care system, Indian Journal of Medical Ethics, 2015, 12,3:149–57

8. PR Sreelakshmi, Sanjeev Nair, Biju Soman, Rani Alex, K Vijayakumar, Maternal and neonatal outcomes of gestational diabetes: a retrospective cohort study from Southern India, Journal of Family Medicine and Primary Care, 2015, 4,3:395–8

9. Bhandari TR, Sarma PS, Utilization of maternal health care services in post conflict Nepal, International Journal of Womena??s Health, 2015, 7:783–90

10. James T T, Kutty V R. Assessment of internalised stigma among patients with mental disorders in Thiruvananthapuram district, Kerala, India, Asia-Pacific Journal of Public Health, Asia-Pacific Journal of Public Health, 2015, 27,4:439–49

11. NS Ganga, Determinants of positive mental health- a path model, Mental Health Review Journal, 2014, 19,1:47–60

12. Tulsi Ram Bhandari, Ganesh Dangal, P Sankara Sarma, Construction and validation of a womena??s autonomy measurement scale with reference to utilization of maternal health care services in Nepal, J Nepal Med Assoc, 2014, 52(195): 925–34

13. S Ramachandran, A Venugopal, Plasma level of cyclophilin A is increased in patients with type 2 diabetes mellitus and suggests presence of vascular disease, Cardiovascular diabetology, 2014, 0.56805555555555554

14. Joe Varghese, The interactions of ethical notions and moral values of immediate stakeholders of immunization services in two Indian states: a qualitative study, BMJ Open, 2013, 1.

15. Joe Varghese and, Governability framework for the evaluation of complex public health functions, Evaluation Review, 2012, 36,4:303–319

16. KUTT, V.R., The Draft National Health Research Policy, ROOP GURSAHANI, 2011, 8

17. Baskaradoss, J. K.; Geevarghese, A.; Kutty, V. R. (April 2011). "Maternal periodontal status and preterm delivery: a hospital based case-control study". Journal of Periodontal Research. 46 (5): 542–9. doi:10.1111/j.1600-0765.2011.01371.x. PMID 21507002.

18. Kutty, V.R.; Soman, CR; Joseph, A.; Pisharody, R.; Vijayakumar, K., Type 2 diabetes in southern Kerala: variation in prevalence among geographic divisions within a region, National Medical Journal of India, 2000, 13; 287–292

19. Raman Kutty, V.; Balakrishnan, KG; Jayasree, AK; Thomas, J., Prevalence of coronary heart disease in the rural population of Thiruvananthapuram district, Kerala, India, International journal of cardiology, 1993, 39; 59–70

== Awards and honors ==
- 1971: Monsignor Kureethadom Gold Medal from the University of Kerala
- 1976: Gold Medal from the Tuberculosis Association of India, Kerala Chapter
- 1987: Fellowship to Harvard School of Public Health from the Ford Foundation
- 1987–1988 Ford Foundation Fellowship to pursue MPH at Harvard University.
- Honorary Membership at International Epidemiological Association
