= Jeemon Panniyammakal =

Indian doctor

Jeemon Panniyammakal is a faculty member in the Achutha Menon Centre for Health Science Studies (AMCHSS) in Sree Chitra Tirunal Institute for Medical Sciences and Technology, Thiruvananthapuram, Kerala, India. Jeemon Panniyammakal has made significant contributions to the prevention and control of cardiovascular diseases and diabetes in India.

He was awarded the Shanti Swarup Bhatnagar Prize for Science and Technology in Medical Sciences in the year 2021 for his contributions to public health.

Jeemon Panniyammakal, who hails from Nilambur, Kerala, India, obtained PhD degree from the University of Glasgow, UK and MPH degree from the Sree Chitra Tirunal Institute of Medical Sciences and Technology.

== Honours and recognitions ==
The honours and recognitions conferred on Jeemon Panniyammakal include:

- Emerging Leader - World Heart Federation (2019)
- Editorial Fellow, Annals of Family Medicine, University of Michigan, USA
- Fellow of the Royal Society for Public Health (London)
- Fellow of the European Society of Cardiology (FESC)
- Senior Clinical and Public Health Fellow DBT-Wellcome Trust India Alliance (IA)

In 2022, Panniyammakal became a laureate of the Asian Scientist 100 by the Asian Scientist.
