= Kairady =

- village
- Location in Kerala, India Kairady (India)
- Coordinates: 10°33′0″N 76°35′0″E
- Country: India
- State: Kerala
- District: Palakkad

Population (2011)
  - Total: 8,626

Languages
  - Official: Malayalam, English
- Time zone: UTC+5:30 (IST)
- PIN: 678510
- Vehicle registration: KL-70
- Nearest Town: Nemmara

Kairady is a village in the Palakkad district, state of Kerala, India. It forms a part of the Ayiloor gram panchayat.

== Demographics ==
As of 2011 India census, Kairady had a population of 8626 with 4159 males and 4467 females.
