= Ayiloor =

Ayiloor (Ayalur) Ayaloor / Ayilur Ayilur, Ayalur
- Village
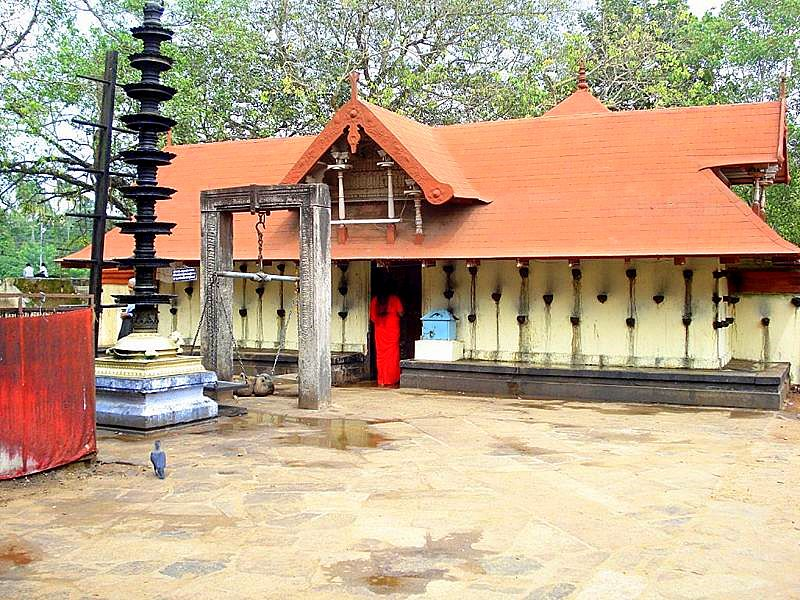
- Bhagavathi Temple, Kudappallur
- Interactive map of Ayiloor (Ayalur)
- Coordinates: 10.569020°N 76.563050°E
- Country: India
- State: Kerala
- District: Palakkad

Population (2011)
  - Total: 8,999

Languages
  - Official: Malayalam, English
- Time zone: UTC+5:30 (IST)
- PIN: 678510
- Vehicle registration: KL-70

Ayiloor, also known as Ayilur, Aylur, or Ayalur, is a village in the Chittur Thaluk of Palakkad district, state of Kerala, India. Ayiloor is located about 30 kilometers away from Palakkad town and 48 kilometers from Thrissur town.

== Education ==
Government Upper Primary School (GUPS), SM High School (SMHS) and IHRD's College of Applied Science are the major educational institutions located in Ayiloor. GUPS was founded in 1890 and caters to students in pre-primary to 7th grade. Founded in 1948, SM High School has 5th to 10th grade. Established in July 2012, the College of Applied Science offers undergraduate programs in Computer Science, Electronics, and Commerce.

NSS College, Nemmara is located at a distance of 2.5 km from Ayalur.

== Healthcare ==
Avitis Institute of Medical Science, a 200-bed multi-specialty hospital, is located 4 kilometers away from Ayiloor.

== Economy ==
Agriculture used to be one of the major sources of income and jobs, however, there has been shift to service oriented economy in the recent decades.

== Demographics ==
As of 2011 India census, Ayiloor had a population of 8999 with 4394 males and 4605 females.
