= Sree Chitra Tirunal Institute for Medical Sciences and Technology =

Research and Development Institute in India

- Motto: Jeeva Jyotir Aseemahi
- Motto in English: May We Live and Have Light
- Type: Institution of National Importance
- Established: 1976; 50 years ago
- Parent institution: Department of Science and Technology, Government of India
- President: Senapathy Kris Gopalakrishnan
- Director: Dr. Sanjay Behari
- Location: Thiruvananthapuram, Kerala, India; 8.5206°N 76.9264°E
- Campus: Urban
- Nickname: SCTIMST
- Mascot: Conch shell
- Website: sctimst.ac.in

Sree Chitra Tirunal Institute for Medical Sciences and Technology (SCTIMST), formerly Sree Chitra Tirunal Medical Center, is an Institution of National Importance in India established in 1976 at Thiruvananthapuram, Kerala. The institute is a statutory body under the Ministry of Science and Technology under the administrative control of the Department of Science and Technology, Government of India. SCTIMST is one of the most prominent research institutes and centers in India.

== History ==
In 1973 Chithira Thirunal Balarama Varma, the last Maharajah of Travancore, gifted a multi-storied building to the Government of Kerala. In 1976 P. N. Haksar, the deputy chairman of the Planning Commission, inaugurated the Sree Chitra Tirunal Medical Center. This was followed by a Biomedical Technology wing, established at the Satelmond Palace, Poojapura, nearly 11 km (6.8 mi) away, a grab from Sethu Lakshmi Bayi, the aunt of Balarama Varma. The institute was declared an Institute of National Importance by an Act of Parliament in 1980, and renamed to its current name. The third wing of the institute, Achutha Menon Center for Health Science Studies (AMCHSS), was established in 2000. The institute is currently headed by Dr Sanjay Behari, prominent neurosurgeon. Former directors of the institute were M. S. Valiathan (1979–1994), K. Mohandas (1994–2009), K. Radhakrishnan (2009–2013) and Dr Asha Kishore (2015–2020). The official emblem of the institute honours the symbol of the royal family of Travancore, the Shankh (conch) of Sree Padmanabhaswamy.

== Divisions ==
- Tertiary Care Hospital (about 250 beds) headed by Dr. Kavita Raja, the current Medical Superintendent (in charge).
- Biomedical Technology Wing (with state of the art technology development facilities) headed by Dr. Harikrishna Varma P. R.
- Center for Health Sciences & Public Health —Achutha Menon Center for Health Science Studies.

=== Achutha Menon Centre for Health Science Studies ===
Named after former chief minister of Kerala C. Achutha Menon, AMCHSS was developed in 1990s with the aim to conduct researches and to educate researchers to reduce health inequity. AMCHSS is the academic division of the institute and conducts research for various disciplines related to health. The center offers MPH, DPH, and PhD courses in health sciences.

=== Biomedical Technology Wing ===
The Biomedical Technology Wing has played a pioneering role in the establishment of a medical device industry base in India by successfully developing and transferring technologies for diverse medical products such as disposable blood bag system, mechanical heart valve prosthesis, blood oxygenators, ophthalmic sponge, concentric needle electrode, hydroxyapatite based biocermaic porous granules with many more in the pipeline with industrial collaboration. It has also been the only institute in India to have developed an artificial heart valve that is currently manufactured and marketed by TTK.

The institute holds international patents for devices and processes and holds the record for maximum number of patents in Kerala. The Biomedical Technology Wing has implemented a quality system to meet the requirements of international standard ISO/IEC 17025. About 20 of these tests are accredited by the Comité français d'accréditation (Cofrac) of France.

=== Hospital Wing ===
The hospital has the following departments:

- Department of Cardiology
- Department of Cardiovascular and Thoracic Surgery
- Department of Anaesthesiology
  - Cardiothoracic and vascular anaesthesiology
  - Neuroanaesthesiology
- Department of Imaging Sciences and Interventional Radiology
- Department of Neurology
- Department of Neurosurgery
- Division of Clinical Engineering
- Division of Microbiology
- Department of Pathology
- Division of Biochemistry
- Department of Transfusion Medicine
- Division of Cellular and Molecular Cardiology
- Division of Tissue Engineering
- Physical Medicine and Rehabilitation department

=== Patient care ===
SCTIMST has a 253-bed hospital for tertiary care of cardiovascular and neurological diseases. It conducts clinics in cardiology, cardiovascular and thoracic, neurology, neurosurgery, radiology, physical medicine and rehabilitation for the public. The institute has pioneered some advanced neurological therapies in India, like Epilepsy surgery and Deep Brain Stimulation. In the past 15 years, the institute has done nearly 1,220 epilepsy surgeries – the highest number by any hospital in Asia.

== Academic offerings ==
The institute has the status of a university and offers postdoctoral, doctoral and postgraduate courses in medical specialties, public health, nursing, physiotherapy, basic sciences and health care technology. It is a member of the Association of Indian Universities and the Association of Commonwealth Universities.

== Notable faculty ==
- B. K. Misra - Neurosurgeon, recipient of Dr. B. C. Roy Award, the highest medical honour in India.
- C. Kesavadas, radiologist, 2009 N-BIOS Prize awardee
- Kurupath Radhakrishnan
- V. Ramankutty
- Lizymol Philipose Pamadykandathil - researcher awarded the highest award for women - Nari Shakti Puraskar in 2017
- Jeemon Panniyammakal was awarded the Shanti Swarup Bhatnagar Prize for Science and Technology in Medical Sciences in the year 2021 for his contributions to public health.
