= Yoko Kato =

Japanese neurosurgeon

- 加藤 庸子
- Born: 9 November 1952 (age 74)
- Education: Aichi Medical University (MD)
- Medical career
- Field: Neurosurgery
- Institutions: Fujita Health University Banbuntane Hotokukai Hospital
- Sub-specialties: Cerebrovascular disease

Yoko Kato (加藤 庸子, Katō Yōko, born 9 November 1952) is a Japanese neurosurgeon. She is professor and chair of the Department of Neurosurgery at Fujita Health University. She was the first woman in Japan to be promoted to full professor of neurosurgery.

== Biography ==
Yoko Kato received her Doctor of Medicine degree in 1978 from Aichi Medical University, where she also completed her residency in the department of neurosurgery. She joined the neurosurgery department at Fujita Health University in 1980, then became an instructor in the department of neurosurgery at Suzhou Medical College in 1981. Kato returned to Fujita Health University as an assistant instructor in 1983. She was promoted to assistant professor in 1988 and associate professor in 2000. She has held visiting professorships at the University of Mainz (1995), George Washington University (1998), and Sri Ramachandra University (2000). In 2006, Kato was promoted to full professor, becoming the first female professor of neurosurgery in Japan. She was named chief of Fujita Health University Banbuntane Hotokukai Hospital's Stroke Center in 2014.

Kato specializes in surgical treatment of cerebrovascular disease, particularly aneurysms and arteriovenous malformations. She has performed more than 1,800 brain aneurysmal clipping procedures throughout her career.

Kato is a proponent for the advancement of neurosurgery in developing countries by directly mentoring neurosurgeons, organizing educational courses, and donating funds for neurosurgical equipment. She also advocates for inclusion of women in neurosurgery. She founded the Women's Neurosurgical Association (WNA) of Japan in 1990 and the Asian Women's Neurosurgical Association (AWNA) in 1996. Kato has spoken about experiences of bias against woman surgeons, such as being mistaken for support staff or perceived as less focused due to family duties. She has advocated for improved research mentorship and access to childcare resources to address gender disparities in academic neurosurgery, as well as increased visibility of successful female neurosurgeons to encourage female trainees to join the profession.

== Awards ==
- 2021 AANS International Lifetime Recognition Award, American Association of Neurological Surgeons
- 2019 Medal of Honor, World Federation of Neurosurgical Societies
- 2019 Honorary Fellowship, American College of Surgeons

== Selected publications ==
- Kato Y, Dong VH, Chaddad F, Takizawa K, Izumo T, Fukuda H; et al. (2019). "Expert Consensus on the Management of Brain Arteriovenous Malformations". Asian J Neurosurg. 14 (4): 1074–1081. doi:10.4103/ajns.AJNS_234_19. PMC 6896626. PMID 31903343.
- Ikawa F, Hidaka T, Yoshiyama M, Ohba H, Matsuda S, Ozono I; et al. (2019). "Characteristics of Cerebral Aneurysms in Japan". Neurol Med Chir (Tokyo). 59 (11): 399–406. doi:10.2176/nmc.ra.2019-0099. PMC 6867938. PMID 31462602.
- Balik V, Yamada Y, Talari S, Kei Y, Sano H, Sulla I; et al. (2017). "State-of-Art Surgical Treatment of Dissecting Anterior Circulation Intracranial Aneurysms". J Neurol Surg a Cent Eur Neurosurg. 78 (1): 67–77. doi:10.1055/s-0036-1588064. PMID 27595273.
- Liang KE, Bernstein I, Kato Y, Kawase T, Hodaie M (2016). "Enhancing Neurosurgical Education in Low- and Middle-income Countries: Current Methods and New Advances". Neurol Med Chir (Tokyo). 56 (11): 709–715. doi:10.2176/nmc.ra.2016-0092. PMC 5221782. PMID 27616319.
- Kato, Yoko (February 2016). "Women in Neurosurgery: A New Paradigm of Thought Will Emerge". World Neurosurgery. 86: A16–A17. doi:10.1016/j.wneu.2015.12.018. ISSN 1878-8750. PMID 26856787.

== Books ==
- Kato, Yoko; Zhang, Xiaohua; Dai, Jiong; Ansari, Ahmed, eds. (2021). Recent Progress in the Management of Cerebrovascular Diseases: Treatment strategies, techniques and complication avoidance. Springer Singapore. ISBN 978-9811633867.
- Kanno, Tetsu; Kato, Yoko, eds. (2007). Minimally Invasive Neurosurgery and Neurotraumatology. Springer Science & Business Media. ISBN 9784431285762.
