= Norman Dott =

Scottish neurosurgeon

Norman McOmish Dott, CBE FRCSE FRSE FRCSC (26 August 1897 – 10 December 1973) was a Scottish neurosurgeon. He was the first holder of the Chair of Neurological Surgery at the University of Edinburgh.

== Life ==
Norman Dott was born in Edinburgh on 26 August 1897, the third of the five children of Rebecca Morton (1864–1917) and Peter McOmish Dott (1856–1934), a picture dealer based at 127 George Street in Edinburgh's New Town. He was educated at George Heriot's School and originally intended a career in engineering. However a serious motorcycle accident on Lothian Road, hospitalised him and left him with a permanent leg injury (also rendering him unfit for service in the First World War). The long spell in hospital re-inspired Dott and he changed his ambition to focus upon medicine rather than engineering. He studied medicine at the University of Edinburgh, graduating M.B. in 1919 and gained a Ph.D. in 1922. In 1923 he was elected a Fellow of the Royal College of Surgeons of Edinburgh. He then received a Rockefeller Travelling Scholarship, allowing him to travel to America to study further in Boston under Processor Harvey Williams Cushing.

In 1932 he began lecturing at the University of Edinburgh, and in 1947 received the Professorship in Neuro-Surgery (one of the first in the world). Meanwhile, he also worked in Royal Hospital for Sick Children, and conducted private brain surgery from a premises in the New Town.

In 1938 he was elected a Fellow of the Royal Society of Edinburgh. His proposers were Edwin Bramwell, Arthur Logan Turner, Anderson Gray McKendrick, and William Thomas Ritchie.

During the Second World War he set up a specialist brain injuries unit at Bangour Hospital west of Edinburgh. He was made a Commander of the Order of the British Empire (CBE) for this work in 1948. In 1960 he set up a Department of Neuro-Surgery at the Edinburgh Royal Infirmary, one of the first such facilities in the National Health Service.

In 1962 he was made a Freeman of the City of Edinburgh. The University of Edinburgh awarded him an honorary doctorate (MD) in 1969. The Royal College of Surgeons of Canada made him an Honorary Fellow in 1973.

He retired in 1963, his chair being filled by Professor Francis Gillingham. He died in Edinburgh on 10 December 1973.

There's a ward at The Walton Centre, Liverpool dedicated to his memory. Portraits of Dott are held at the National Galleries of Scotland (a photograph by Grace Alison) and at the Royal College of Surgeons of Edinburgh (a painting by Sir William Hutchison). A biography of Dott was published in 1990 titled With Sharp Compassion.

== Family ==
He married Margaret ("Peggy") Robertson in 1932. They had a daughter named Jean.

== Family background ==
The Dott family - formerly D'Ott or possibly De Ott - were of Huguenot stock and had arrived in Scotland from the Low Countries in the late 17th century, when they settled at Cupar in Fife. Peter's father, Aitken Dott, had founded a picture-framing business in Edinburgh's South St David Street in 1842.

In 1876 the young Peter Dott joined his father in the family business - later Aitken Dott & Sons - now removed to larger premises at Castle Street. Although she had been born at Birkenhead on Merseyside, Rebecca Dott's family were Ulster Scots. Having had a short-lived marriage in the 1880s, she had been a widow for several years when she married Peter Dott on 2 April 1894, at which time they settled in Colinton on the outskirts of Edinburgh.

== See also ==
- Kate Hermann

== Further reading and external links ==
- Norman M. Dott, master of hypothalamic craniopharyngioma surgery: the decisive mentoring of Harvey Cushing and Percival Bailey at Peter Bent Brigham Hospital
- Norman Dott, Gerard Guiot, and Jules Hardy: key players in the resurrection and preservation of transsphenoidal surgery
- Portrait of Dott (National Galleries of Scotland)
- A pituitary tumour from 1927 (clinical case involving Dott and later society photographer Grace Alison)
