= Francis Gillingham =

British neurosurgeon

Francis John Gillingham CBE (15 March 1916 – 3 January 2010) was a British neurosurgeon.

== Early life ==
Gillingham was born in Dorchester, Dorset, England, on 15 March 1916, the only son of Mr. and Mrs. J. H. Gillingham. He was educated at Hardye's School, Dorset, and then studied medicine at St. Bartholomew's Hospital Medical College of London University.

== Second World War ==
After completing house appointments at St. Bartholomew's and Lord Mayor Treloar Cripples' Hospital, in Hampshire, he joined the Royal Army Medical Corps, serving with the Eighth Army in North Africa and Italy. Subsequently he was appointed General Duties Officer at the Military Hospital (head injuries), Oxford, under Colonel Hugh Cairns and Group Captain Symonds.

In December 1945 "in recognition of gallant and distinguished services in Italy" he was made a Member of the Most Excellent Order of the British Empire.

After World War II, he returned to St. Bartholomew's Hospital with Sir James Paterson Ross and Mr. J.E.A. O'Connell.

== Later career ==
In 1950, he moved to Edinburgh and was appointed Consultant Neurosurgeon in the Department of Surgical Neurology. Additionally he was appointed Director of the Department and Senior Lecturer in Surgical Neurology at the University of Edinburgh. In 1962, he was named Reader and, in 1963, succeeded Professor Norman Dott as Professor of Surgical Neurology, University of Edinburgh.

In 1952 Gillingham was elected a member of the Harveian Society of Edinburgh and served as President in 1980. In 1955, he was elected a Fellow of the Royal College of Surgeons of Edinburgh. In 1980 he was elected President of the College. In 1965 he was elected a member of the Aesculapian Club.

Gillingham was considered a pioneer in the field of stereotactic surgery and was widely credited with introducing the concept of subspecialty fellowships to British neurosurgical training.

Due a growing reputation as an expert in Parkinson's disease Gillingham was selected to operate on S. J. V. Chelvanayakam, Leader of the Tamil United Liberation Front, who was suffering from the disease. The surgery, carried out in Edinburgh in 1961 was deemed a success and ultimately prolonged Chelvanayakam's life.

In January 1982 Gillingham was made a Commander of the Most Excellent Order of the British Empire, three years previously he had also received the Clark Foundation Award for Services to Road Safety after campaigning for seatbelts to become mandatory in every car.

== Retirement ==
Gillingham retired in 1985 and lived in Edinburgh until 2005, after which he moved to Prebendal, Shipton-under-Wychwood. He died aged 93 on Sunday, 3 January 2010. His son, Dr Jeremy J Gillingham, was killed in a skiing accident in France in 1994.
