= Yokoo =

Yokoo (written: 横尾) is a surname. Notable people with the surname include:

- Kazuko Yokoo (born 1941), Japanese diplomat
- Kazunori Yokoo, Japanese actor
- Kaname Yokoo (born 1972), Japanese golfer
- Tadanori Yokoo (born 1936), Japanese graphic designer
- Yoko Taro (born 1970), Japanese video game director
