= Neurological Society of India =

Neurological Scientists of India

- Founder: Jacob Chandy; Balasubramaniam Ramamurthi; S. T. Narasimhan; Baldev Singh
- Headquarters: India

The Neurological Society of India (NSI) is the apex body representing neuroscientists of the country. It was founded in 1951 by Jacob Chandy, Balasubramaniam Ramamurthi, S. T. Narasimhan, and Baldev Singh, who together have been credited to be pioneers in development of epilepsy surgery in India. The society appointed Jacob Chandy as its first President. The society publishes the bi-monthly journal Neurology India.

== History and works ==
Neurosurgeon Jacob Chandy and neurologist Baldev Singh were associated with Christian Medical College & Hospital, Vellore and physician-electrophysiologist S. T. Narasimhan and neurosurgeon Balasubramaniam Ramamurthi were from Madras Medical College & Hospital. They together founded the society in 1951 and had its first meeting in March 1952 at Hyderabad and published its own journal dedicated to the neurosciences titled Indian Journal – Neurology. There being another journal by the same name, the society decided to rename their journal to Neurology India in 1953.

Since its inception, the society held its annual meetings with the Association of Physicians of India but starting the following year, it established its own annual conference and created its sub-sections of Neurology, Neurosurgery, Neuropathology and Neuroradiology in the Society. On 25 October 1969, the society registered itself with the Charity Commissioner, Public Trusts Registration Office, Greater Bombay Region (No. F-1819 (B)).

In 1972, the society formed a sub-committee for standardization of Postgraduate Education. In 1977, the society became the first medical professional society in the country to conduct the continuing medical education by providing "updates on selected topics and encouraging interdisciplinary interaction among trainees in the various branches of the Neurological Sciences". In 1979, NSI founded a new association, the Satellite Conference of Neuro-nurses of India, as its branch held with the main objective to "set high standards of neuro-nursing in the country". The conferences of the association are conducted annually along with the annual conference of NSI. In 1977, the society formed four Working Groups to deal with Medical Education and Training, Research priorities, Manpower requirements and development of Services, Community Programme, and Instrumentation along with two new sub-sections, Neurophysiology and Electroencephalography. In 1979, the Association of Neurological Nurses as another sub-section was formed and named as "Society of Indian Neurosciences Nurses (SINN)". The society formed a sub-section of Neurophysiological Technologists in 1988 and named as "Association of Neurophysiological Technologists of India (ANTI)".

The society instituted the "Dr. Jacob Chandy Oration" in 1969 and the "Dr. B. Ramamurthi Oration" in 1974, both to be held every two years along with the "Dr. R.G. Ginde Oration" in 1988, the "Dr. Baldev Singh Oration" in 1994, and the "Dr. Tandon Oration" in 1998 which are to be held every three years. Only two orations are organized during the annual conference each year and the orators are selected by the incumbent and immediate two past Presidents of the society. The society has five subspeciality societies associated with it which includes the Indian Society for Paediatric Neurosurgery, the Indian Society for Stereotactic and Functional Neurosurgery, the Skull Base Surgery Society, the Neurotraumatology Society of India, and the Cerebrovascular Society of India.

The Neurological Society of India is affiliated to the World Federation of Neurosurgical Societies, the Asian Australasian Society of Neurological Surgeons the World Federation of Neurology, the International Society of Neuropathology, the International Federation of Societies for Electroencephalography and Clinical Neurophysiology and there are two associations affiliated to the NSI, the Association of Neurological Nurses and the Association of Neurophysiological Technologists. The society has over 2000 members and has been involved in organising seminars and conferences to initiate interaction among practicing neurologists. In 2014, the society launched an awareness campaign called "Heads.. We Win" to encourage wearing of helmets, the lack of which causes major head injuries.

== Presidents ==
List of presidents of NSI

- Jacob Chandy 1952
- T. K. Ghosh 1953
- R. G. Ginde 1954-55
- W. Grillmayr 1956
- Menino D’ Souza 1957
- B. Ramamurthi 1958
- E. P. Bharucha 1959
- R. N. Chatterjee 1960
- C. G. S. Iyer 1961
- Baldev Singh 1962
- N. H. Wadia 1963
- B. K. Anand 1964
- N. S. Wadia 1965
- D. K. Dastur 1966
- Anil D. Desai 1967
- B. Dayananda Rao 1968
- Sriramachari 1969
- Asoke K. Bagchi 1970
- Baldev Singh 1971
- K. S. Mani 1972
- B. K. Bachhawat 1973
- S. Balaparameshwara Rao 1974
- Gajendra Singh 1975
- Arjundas 1976
- K. V. Mathai 1977
- Vimala Virmani 1978
- Mahendra Singh 1979
- K. Jagannathan 1980
- D. R. Gulati 1981
- S. Janaki 1982
- Jacob Abraham 1983
- M. Veera Raghava Reddy 1984
- P. N. Tandon 1985
- B. S. Singhal 1986
- S. Kalyanaraman 1987
- Shyamal Sen 1988
- S. N. Bhagwati 1989-90
- A .K. Banerjee 1991
- K. Srinivasan 1992
- K. Srinivasan 1993
- Sanathan Rath 1994
- Gourie Devi 1995
- M. Sambasivan 1996
- Sarla Das 1997
- V. K. Kak 1998
- Rajasekaran Nair 1999
- Arjun D.Seghal 2000
- M. C. Maheswari 2001
- Mathew J. Chandy 2002
- J. S. Chopra 2003
- S. R. Dharker 2004
- C. U. Velmurugendran 2005
- K. Ganapathy 2006
- V. S. Mehta 2007
- B. K. Misra 2008
- V. K. Khosla 2009
- S. K. Prabhakar 2010
- V. K.Jain 2011
- K. E. Turel 2012
- C. E. Deopujari 2013
- V. Rajshekhar 2014
- B. S. Sharma 2015
- R. C. Mishra 2016
- Deepu Banerji 2017
- Y R Yadav - 2021

== Lifetime Achievement Awardees ==
In 2008, the society instituted a Lifetime Achievement Award and as of 2014 following 21 recipients have been awarded; S. N. Bhagwati, H. M. Dastur, Prakash Narain Tandon, and Noshir Wadia in 2008, Sanatan Rath and Krishnamoorthy Srinivas in 2009, A. K. Banerji, V. S. Dave, and J. S. Chopra in 2010, R. Marthanda Varma and G. N. N. Reddy in 2011, Anupam Das Gupta and B. S. Das in 2012, B. J. Damany, V. K. Kak, and G. M. Taori in 2013 and P. S. Ramani, G. Arjun Das, S. Kalyanraman, T. S. Kanaka, and Ashru K. Banerjee in 2014 The award is conferred only on the life members of the society above the age of 75 years with the significant contribution to the development of Neurosciences in India and is presented during the inaugural function of the annual conference. In 2014, the General body of the society revised and passed its constitution and bye-laws to award only three recipients per year.

== Honorary members ==
Various individuals who have been associated with the society as honorary members include John A Simpson, John Walton, Baron Walton of Detchant, Theodore Rasmussen, Lindsay Simon, Majid Samii, Tetsuo Kanno, Balasubramaniam Ramamurthi, Jacob Chandy, and T. K. Ghosh.
