= Avitis Institute of Medical Science =

Avitis Institute of Medical sciences
- Location within Kerala

Geography
- Location: Nenmara, Palakkad, Kerala, India
- Coordinates: 10.5904084°N 76.5824724°E

Services
- Emergency department: Yes
- Beds: 200

History
- Founded: 20 December 2017

Links
- Website: Official Website
- Lists: Hospitals in India

Avitis Institute of Medical Sciences is an Indian hospital based in Palakkad, Kerala, India.

== Background ==
Avitis Institute of Medical Sciences, a unit of Avitis Super Speciality Hospitals Private Ltd, was founded by Prasanth Manghat and Promoth Manghat who were then senior executes at NMC Health. Avitis was inaugurated by Pinarayi Vijayan in June 2019 and it primarily serve rural areas of Palakkad District.

The promoters of the group Manghat brothers were later accused of involving in financial misappropriates related to NMC Health at United Arab Emirates. In 2026, Krishna Institute of Medical Sciences entered into twenty year contract to operate the hospitals.

== Facilities ==
Avitis is a 200-bed multi-specialty hospital with qualified doctors, trained staff, and modern medical technology for diagnosing and treating patients. The Radiology and Imaging Sciences Department has digital X-rays, ventilators, operation theatres with airflow systems, a blood bank, a 24-hour pharmacy, and ambulatory services.

== Services ==
Centers of Excellence

Avitis Institute of Cardiac Sciences

- Critical Cardiac Care
- Physiological Studies
- Cardiac, Thoracic
- Lung and Vascular Surgeries
- Cardiac Rehabilitation

Avitis Institute of Neuro Sciences

- Epilepsy Management
- Stroke
- Movement Disorder
- Neurosurgery
- Neuro-rehabilitation

Avitis Institute of Gastro-intestinal and Hepato-biliary Sciences

- Endoscopy
- GI Bleed Care
- Hepatology
- Minimally Invasive Gastro Surgery

Avitis Institute of Renal Sciences

- Nephrology
- Dialysis Unit
- Urology

Sub Specialties

- Obstetrics and Gynaecology
- Paediatrics and Neonatology
- Orthopaedics and Sports Medicine
- Rheumatology
- Family Medicine
- Pulmonary Medicine
- ENT and Head & Neck Surgery
- Dermatology
- Dental & Maxillofacial Surgery
- Critical Care Medicine
- Emergency Medicine
- Internal Medicine
- General Surgery
- Anaesthesiology
- Mental Health
- Radio Diagnosis and Imaging Sciences
- Laboratory Medicine
- Transfusion Medicine
- Plastic Surgery

== Activities ==
In May 2018, two of the hospital's executive directors, Santhi Promoth and Jyothy Palat, reached out to help the family of nurse Lini Puthussery. They learned nurse Lini had died within days of contracting the Nipah virus after dutifully attending to the first victim of the virus outbreak in Kerala. The executives promised they would see to it that the educational expenses of Lini's children, ages 2 and 5 at the time of her death, would be covered, beginning with the 2019 academic year and carrying forward to when they acquire a professional degree or begin a postgraduate course. In August 2018, the hospital again gained notability for their aid and rescue efforts when helping the victims of Nelliyampathy, Kerala after flooding and heavy rains caused 70 landslides making roads impossible from the upper reaches of the Nelliyampathy Mountains to the mainland.
