= Aichi Medical University =

- 愛知医科大学
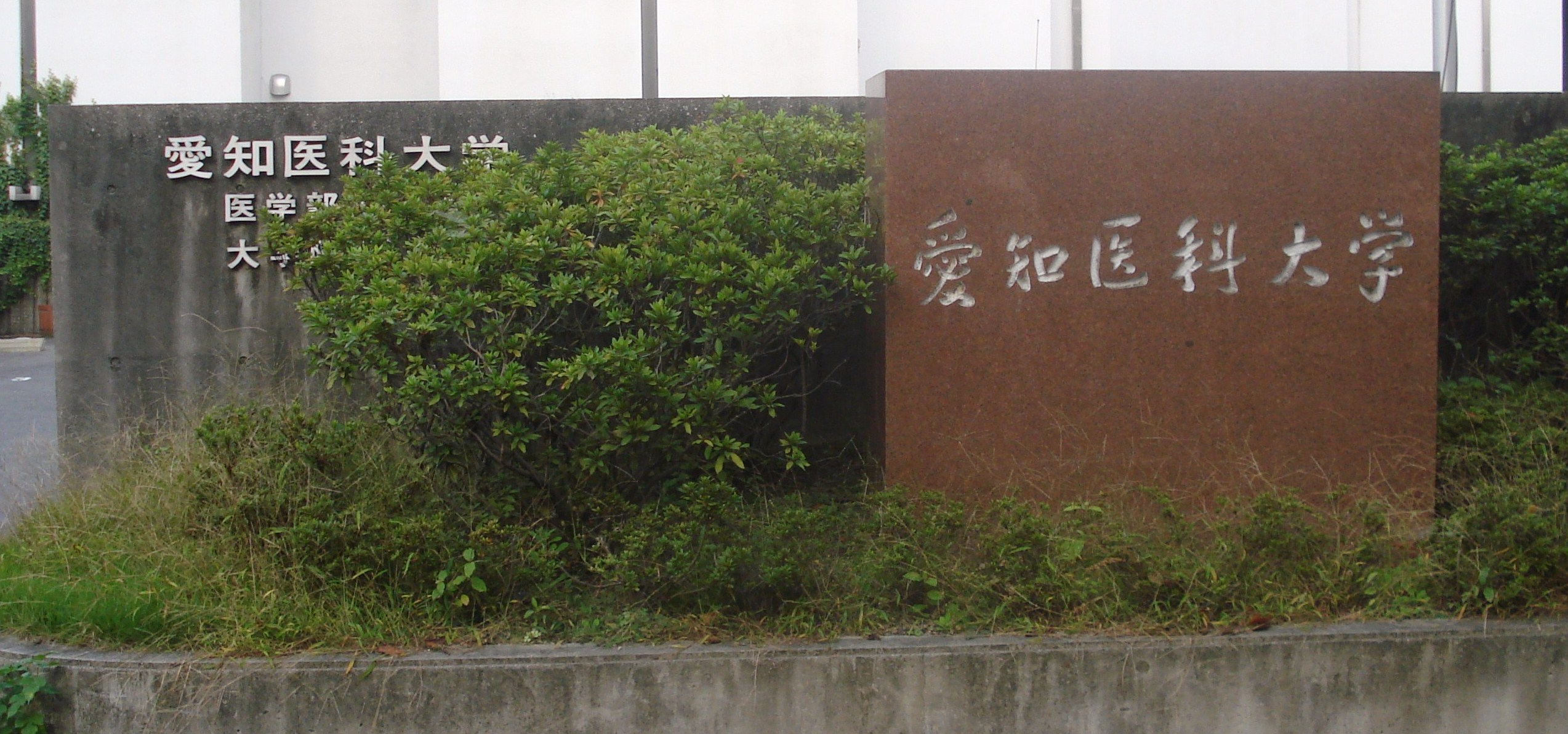
- Aichi Medical University
- Type: Private
- Established: 1971
- Location: Nagakute, Aichi, Japan; 35.1925°N 137.0474°E
- Website: www.aichi-med-u.ac.jp/english/index.html

Aichi Medical University (愛知医科大学, Aichi ika daigaku) is a private university at Nagakute, Aichi, Japan, founded in 1971.
