= Balasubramaniam Ramamurthi =

Indian neurosurgeon

Ramamurthi Balasubramaniam
- Born: 30 January 1922; Sirkazhi, Tamil Nadu
- Died: 13 December 2003 (aged 81)
- Education: Madras Medical College
- Occupation: Neurosurgeon
- Spouse: Indira Ramamurthi
- Children: 2

Ramamurthi Balasubramaniam (30 January 1922 – 13 December 2003) was an Indian neurosurgeon, author, editor, a pioneer in neurosurgery in India and often recognized as the Father of Neurosurgery of India. He set up the Department of Neurosurgery at the Government General Hospital, Chennai in 1950, the Department of Neurosurgery at the Madras Medical College and founded the Institute of Neurology, Madras in the 1970s. He was awarded the Padma Bhushan and the Dhanvantri Award for his contribution to the field of Neurosurgery in India. He is also a recipient of the Lifetime Achievement Award of Madras Neuro Trust.

== Early life and education ==
He was born in Sirkazhi. His father Captain T. S. Balasubramaniam was an Assistant Surgeon in the Government Hospital then. His grandfather′s brother was Shri G. Subramania Iyer, one of the founders of the English daily The Hindu. Prof.BRM studied at the ER High School in Trichy. He completed an MS in General Surgery from the Madras Medical College and went on to complete FRCS at Edinburgh in 1947.

== Career ==
In 1960, Dr. B. Ramamurthi and his team, Drs. V. Balasubramaniam, S. Kalyanaraman and T. S. Kanaka supported by their neurologist counterparts Drs.G.Arjundas and K.Jagannathan, became the earliest team in India to perform Stereotactic surgery procedures.

In the early 1970s, Dr. Ramamurthi built the Institute of Neurology, Madras on the lines of the Montreal Neurological Institute at Canada, with all branches of neurosciences under one roof. He started the Dr. A. Lakshmipathi Neurosurgical Centre at the Voluntary Health Services (VHS) Hospital at Adyar in 1977-1978, named after his father-in-law, Dr. A. Lakshmipathi. VHS Hospital was the brainchild of Dr. K. S. Sanjivi. Prof. B. Ramamurthi served as the Dean of the Hospital and Principal of the Madras Medical College and Honorary Vice Chancellor of the University of Madras during his long and extensive years as a teacher, mentor and guide. He was appointed as the President of the World Federation of Neurosurgical Societies in 1987 and also served as the former President of the National Board of Medical Examinations in India.

Amongst the many units of neurosurgery he helped set up, the National Brain Research Centre (Manesar, near New Delhi), as an apex body for the coordination of brain research in the country, was his dream come true. He also became a Fellow of the National Academy of Medical Sciences in 1962, Fellow of the Academy of Sciences in 1972, Fellow of the Indian National Science Academy in 1981 and Fellow of the Royal Society of Medicine of London in 1983. He was the Founder Secretary of the Neurological Society of India. He was awarded the Raja-Lakshmi Award in the year 1987 by Sri Raja-Lakshmi Foundation Chennai. He trained many eminent neurosurgeons including Dr. Raja, who is now known as the father of the Neurosurgery department at Kasturba Medical College, Manipal. Dr. Ramamurthi has been himself associated with the Neurosurgery department at Kasturba Medical College, Manipal, having first visited the hospital briefly in 1979 and persuaded his student Dr. Raja to join the Neurosurgery department there, and also having inaugurated the use of advanced medical equipment there in 1991.

== Legacy ==
The Ramamurthi Neurosciences Museum in Chennai is named after him. His autobiography "Uphill all the way" (Tamil translation - "thadaigal pala thandi") was released by the Chief Minister Karunanidhi in January 2000.
