= Nagai Muralidharan =

- Born: 4 December 1958 (age 67)
- Origin: Chennai, Tamil Nadu, India
- Genre: Carnatic music – Indian Classical Music
- Occupation: Violinist
- Years active: 1995–present

Nagai Muralidharan (born 4 December 1958 in Chennai, Tamil Nadu) is an Indian Carnatic violinist. In 2003, he was awarded the Kalaimamani by the State Government of Tamil Nadu.

== Musical career ==
Muralidharan began learning the violin from his mother, Shrimati R. Komalavalli. He later studied under Sri R.S. Gopalakrishnan, a violinist from Chennai.

Muralidharan gave his first performance at the age of 10 and has been a violinist for over 50 years. He has performed in Radio Sangeetha Sammelan concerts on Doordarshan and has been a violin accompanist on several albums. From 1978 to 2004, he worked as a violin artist at All India Radio in Trichy.

Over the years, Muralidharan has performed in the United States, Canada, Australia, Singapore, Malaysia, the United Arab Emirates, Qatar, Bahrain, Japan, and Kuwait.

Muralidharan has accompanied many vocal and instrumental artists in their concerts, including Semmangudi Srinivasa Iyer, Alathur Srinivasa Iyer, M.D. Ramanathan, Dr. M. Balamuralikrishna, Voleti Venkateswarulu, Nedunoori Krishnamurthy, R.K. Srikantan, Maharajapuram V. Santhanam, Madurai Somasundaram, Palghat K.V. Narayanaswamy, T.M. Thyagarajan, D.K. Jayaraman, T.K. Govinda Rao, Dr. S. Ramanathan, B. Rajam Iyer, Tanjore S. Kalyanaraman, Seerkazhi Govindarajan, Chidambaram C.S. Jayaraman, K.J. Yesudas, T.V. Sankaranarayanan, Madurai T.N. Seshagopalan, Neyveli Santhanagopalan, Sanjay Subrahmanyan and P. Unnikrishnan.

He has also accompanied instrumentalists including S. Balachander (veena), M. Balamuralikrishna (viola), T.R. Mahalingam (flute), Dr. N. Ramani (flute), Namagiripetai Krishnan (nadaswaram), A.K.C Natrajan (clarinet) and Kadri Gopalnath (saxophone).

In solo concerts, he has been accompanied by percussion artists such as Dr. T.K. Murthy, Vellore Ramabadran, Umayalpuram K. Sivaraman, Trichy Sankaran, Guruvayur Dorai, Tanjore Upendran, Karaikudi R. Mani, Mannargudi Easwaran, Srimushnam Raja Rao, Thiruvarur Bakthavatsalam, T.H. Vikku Vinayakram, Thirupanithura Radhakrishnan, Coimbatore Mohanram, V. Suresh, among others.

In 1985, he performed a 26-hour non-stop marathon violin concert held at Sri Rangam Temple in Tamil Nadu. Muralidharan accompanied Sri K.J. Yesudas in Dubai on the 50th anniversary of Indian Independence Day in 1997.

== Awards and titles ==
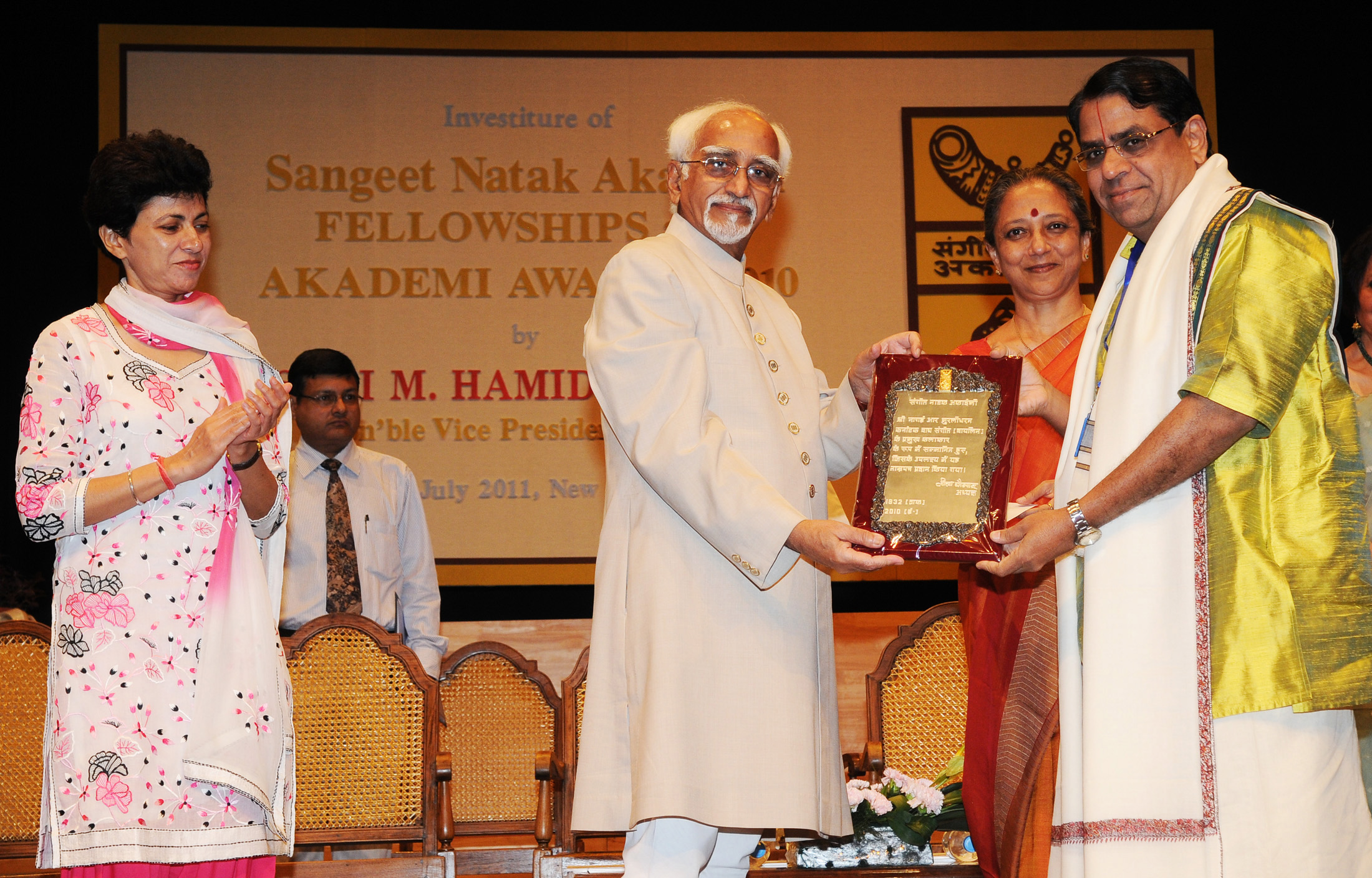
Mohd. Hamid Ansari presenting the Sangeet Natak Akademi Award-2010 to Shri Nagai R. Murlidharan, Chennai, for his outstanding contribution to Carnatic Instrumental Music (Violin)

Kalaimamani – Tamil Nadu State Government – (2003)

Arsha Kala Bhushanam – Arsha Kala Gurukulam – Poojya Swamiji Dayananda Saraswathi – (2007)

Maharajapuram Santhanam Memorial Award – Maharajapuram Santhanam Trust (2009)

Sahrudaya Seva Rathna – Shi-Ba Sangeetha Sabha Chennai (2009)

Vani Kala Sudhakra – Sri Thyaga Brahma Gana Sabha (2010)

Sangeet Natak Academi Award – Government of India (2010)

Gaana Padhmam – Brahma Gana Sabha, Chennai (2011)

Asthana Vidwan – Kanchi Kamakoti Peetam, Kanchipuram – (2014)

Sangeetha Rathnakara – Bhairavi Fine Arts, Cleveland, Ohio, US (2015)

== Discography ==
- "Young maestros" (1988)
- "Na Jeevadhara" (2014)
