= Cleveland Thyagaraja Festival =

Music and dance festival in Ohio, US

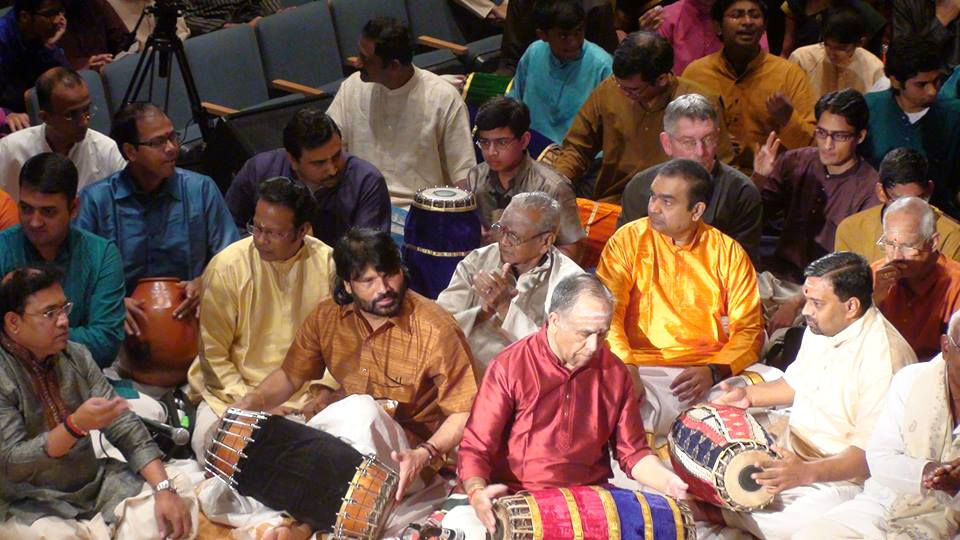
- Status: Active
- Genre: Indian classical music and dance festival
- Frequency: Annual
- Locations: Cleveland, Ohio, United States
- Years active: 1978; 48 years ago
- Established: 1978
- Participants: Carnatic musicians, dancers, and artists

The Cleveland Thyagaraja Festival is a 12-day festival of South Indian classical music and dance in Cleveland, Ohio, and is held each year around Easter weekend. The festival is a celebration in honor of Tyagaraja, the famous composer of Carnatic music, who composed thousands of devotional compositions, most in Telugu and Sanskrit language . The festival began in 1978, and has since grown to become the largest South Indian classical music and dance festival outside of India. The festival draws its audience from all over the United States, as well as from Canada and other parts of the world.

== History ==
=== Beginning ===
In the early 1970s, Cleveland was home to an informal group of Indian immigrants and their families, known as the "Cleveland Bhajan Group". When Ramnad Raghavan, the noted mridangam artist from India moved to Cleveland in 1977, he discovered that many members of the group had learned music as children, and wanted to start some activities to revive their interest in music. He suggested starting a Tyagaraja Aradhana in Cleveland, and offered to train the group to sing Tyagaraja's compositions, as is done in the original Tyagaraja Aradhana held in Tiruvaiyyar.

At his suggestion, V.V. Sundaram, R. Balasubramaniam ("Cleveland Balu"), and Gomathy Balasubramaniam formed the Aradhana Committee to organize and conduct the Cleveland Thyagaraja Festival.

The first festival was held on April 8, 1978, in the rented hall of Faith United Church of Christ, in Richmond Heights, Ohio. It included a group performance of the Pancharathna krithis, individual singing of Tyagaraja's krithis, followed by a concert in the evening by Saroja Balasubramaniam, from Maryland, to an audience of 75 people.

=== Move to Cleveland State University ===
In the Fall of 1978, Prof. T. Temple Tuttle of Cleveland State University befriended Ramnad Raghavan after attending a lecture of his at the Niagara chapter of the Society for Ethnomusicology. They began collaborating on a series of projects, and Prof. Tuttle suggested that the Festival move to the university's campus in order to attract and accommodate a larger audience. Since 1979, the university has been the venue for the Festival.

Starting in 1979, the Festival also started bringing musicians from India to perform, in order to draw a larger audience.

The festival traditionally started with a brief puja, followed by bhajans sung by the Cleveland Bhajan Group. This was followed by the group singing of the pancharathna krithis, which was open to everyone attending the festival, including visiting artists. A South Indian lunch prepared by volunteers was served free to all attendees. Anyone who wished to perform a composition of Tyagaraja was given a five-minute slot during the individual singing part of the festival.

The last program of the day was a full concert performed by a visiting professional musician from India.

== Growth ==
The festival was regularly conducted during spring break for local schools. Starting in 1987, it was scheduled to align to Easter weekend, which has continued ever since.

The Aradhana Committee would print invitations and mail them to Indian families across the US and Canada. The Sundaram family and the Balasubramaniam family would host all visiting musicians. In addition, they would connect visitors with local families who would host them, often total strangers, in their homes for the duration of the festival.

The festival format consisted of just one concert for many years, and would rarely feature two or three, spread over Easter weekend. The first major growth occurred in 1992, when the festival hosted a jugalbandhi featuring N. Ramani, Mandolin U. Srinivas, and Zakir Hussein, who were accompanied by A. Kanyakumari and Guruvayoor Dorai. That year attracted a massive turnout of people who were new to the festival and drawn by the unique programming. In the following years, the festival also hosted eminent dancers, such as Kamala, Vyjayanthimala Bali, and dance productions choreographed by Rhadha, such as Jaya Jaya Devi (original music composed by Lalgudi Jayaraman), and Lakshmi Prabhavam (original music composed by N. Ravikiran).

Since then, the festival has regularly featured star musicians and dancers from India, and also commissioned major dance productions with original music compositions, for their world premier in Cleveland.

By 2002, the festival had grown to span across the entire week following Easter Sunday into the next weekend, with a series of music and dance performances. Notable artists over the years included star performers like Nithyasree Mahadevan, Ranjani-Gayatri, Sudha Raghunathan, Lalgudi Jayaraman, K.V. Narayanaswamy, Sanjay Subrahmanyan, T.M. Krishna, Thiruvarur Bhakthavatsalam, T. S. Nandakumar, Nagai Muralidharan, Mannargudi Easwaran, Srimushnam Raja Rao, S.Sowmya, Trichy Sankaran as well as stalwarts such as T. Muktha (in her last public performance), Parassalla Ponnamma, Thanjavur Sankara Iyer, and Kuzhikkarai Viswalingam.

The festival also gained a great deal of visibility across the world through regular coverage on Indian television, as well as media partners providing live streaming of the event.

In 2019, the centerpiece of the festival, the Pancharatna Kriti singing in remembrance of Saint Tyagaraja was moved to the Wolstein Center arena to accommodate the growing audience for the event.

=== Competitions ===
==== Music ====
In 1993, the festival started hosting a music competition for children and youth across North America, with visiting musicians from India as the judges. The competitions have grown over the years, and have become the largest Carnatic music competition in the United States, with over 850 entries in 2016. The competition is open to vocalists and instrumentalists (including percussion), and includes advanced categories for improvisation such as niraval and kalpana swaram. The two highest level competitions are the "Concert Competition", and "Advanced Pallavi", where the winners receive a performance opportunity in the following year.

==== Dance ====
To complement the music competition, the festival also started hosting a Bharathanatyam competition in 2007, with one age category. The dance competition attracts participants from all over the world, and has grown to include four age categories. It is conducted over two days, with live preliminary rounds on the first day, and finalists chosen to perform on the following day. A grand prize winner is selected across all categories, to perform in India during the Chennai December season.

== Present Day ==
The Cleveland Thyagaraja Festival now takes place over 12 days, beginning the Wednesday before Easter. The majority of the programs presented are Carnatic music concerts.

The festival includes a variety of musicians, from star performers to rising youngsters, to lesser-known stalwarts. There is a mix of vocalists and instrumentalists, and the committee has made it a point to include veena and nadaswaram artists each year to support these traditional instruments. The festival also started featuring a small number of Hindustani concerts, since 2012.

There are also a number of dance performances at the festival. These are mostly Bharathanatyam, but Kuchipudi, Kathak, Kathakali, Mohiniyattam, Odissi, Yakshagana, and Andhra Natyam have also been featured. Many of the dance performances are specially commissioned works, with original music and choreography (Ramayana in 5 parts, 2011; Mahabharatha in 5 parts, 2014; Srimad Bhagavatham in 5 parts, 2017).

The festival is notable for the large participation of children and youth. Apart from the music and dance competitions, there are also several concerts presented by music schools that bring large numbers of their students from across North America. Winners from the music and dance competitions are also regularly featured in productions.

There have also been a number of collaborative programs involving non-Indian musicians, both as a fusion of Indian and Western classical music, as well Jazz and World Music concerts.

The festival was not held in the years 2020-2022 due to the COVID-19 pandemic.

=== American Talent ===
In addition to visiting artists from India, the festival also features a number of performers drawn from across the US and Canada. Some are musicians who immigrated from India, and others grew up in North America, came up through the competitions and other initiatives, and took up music or dance seriously as a performing art. These artists have been featured alongside senior musicians from India, and have also conceived and executed programs independently at the behest of the Aradhana Committee to perform in Cleveland, as well as to tour the United States.

=== Education ===
==== Sustaining Sampradaya ====
In 2007, the Aradhana Committee launched an educational program called Sustaining Sampradaya. Each year, they select children from across the US, and put them through a rigorous six-month training program via video-conferencing, culminating in group performances at the festival in Cleveland. The students are trained by senior musicians in India, and learn compositions that have been transmitted for centuries through an oral tradition.

The committee makes notations for the compositions, and recordings of the lessons available to download for free from their web site. As of 2016, lessons for over 300 unique compositions are available to download.

==== Dance Workshop ====
Each year, the festival includes a workshop for students of Indian dance, called Margam. The workshop is conducted by a different dance teacher each year and has spanned several different dance schools. The workshop is usually for Bharatanatyam, but other dance forms such as Kuchipudi and Kathak have also been included.

=== Expansion in India ===
Since 2011, the Aradhana Committee has also hosted a festival in Chennai, during the December music season. The festival primarily features American youth performers of classical music and dance, but also includes musicians based in India.

Through partnerships in India, the committee has also promoted concert performances of Indian-American youth in Chennai sabhas, as well as on national television programs such as Nadaneerajanam in Tirupati. The committee has also worked with media organizations to produce television talent shows such as Carnatic Music Idol USA, and Natya Urchavam to showcase American talent to audiences abroad.

== See also ==
- Tyagaraja
- Tyagaraja Aradhana
- List of Indian classical music festivals
