= Ramanathapuram C. S. Murugabhoopathy =

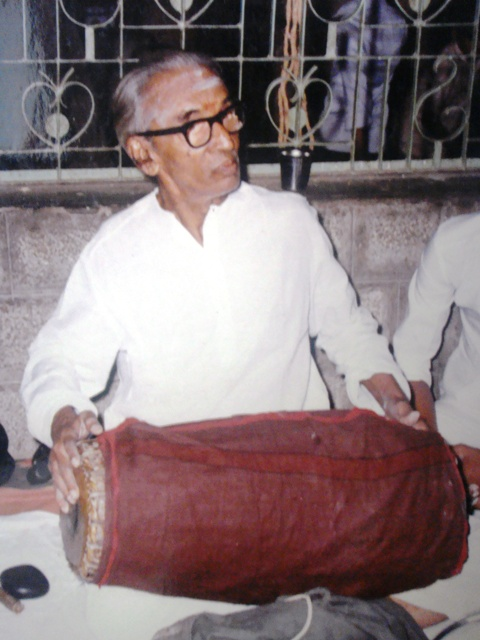

Background information
- Also known as: CSM or Chellaswamy Sirchabai Murugabhoopathy
- Born: 14 February 1914
- Origin: India
- Died: 21 March 1998 (aged 84)
- Genre: Indian classical music
- Occupation: Mridanga artist
- Instrument: Mridanga

Ramanathapuram C. S. Murugabhoopathy (14 February 1914 – 21 March 1998), popularly referred to as CSM, was one of the most distinguished Mridanga maestros of the 20th century. He was a contemporary of Palghat Mani Iyer (1912–1981) and Palani Subramania Pillai (1908–1962). The three are referred to as the "Holy Trinity of Mridanga".

== Early life ==
Born in the town of Ramanathapuram (also known as Ramnad) in Tamil Nadu, Murugabhoopathy obtained his early lessons in Mridanga from his father Chitsabai Servai (also Sirchabai Servai) and later on from Palani Muttiah Pillai (the father of Palani Subramania Pillai), both of whom were students of the great Pudukottai Manpoondia Pillai (read as Maamudia Pillai). Murugabhoopathy's elder brother C. S. Sankarasivam Bhagavatar was a strong influence in the development of Murugabhoopathy's musical style. A young CSM picked up many tips from legendary percussionists including Kumbhakonam Azhaganambi Pillai, who taught him some intricate techniques of playing with his left hand.

== Major performances ==
Murugabhoopathy accompanied many carnatic stalwarts such as Ariyakudi Ramanuja Iyengar, Chittoor Subramania Pillai, Musiri Subramania Iyer, and Dandapani Desikar. CSM benefited a lot from the generous promotion and support given by Chembai Vaidyanatha Bhagavathar and Semmangudi Srinivasa Iyer. He later on played alongside G. N. Balasubramaniam, Madurai Mani Iyer, M.K Thyagaraja Bhagavathar, Dr.M.Balamuralikrishna, M. D. Ramanathan, Ramnad Krishnan, T. M. Thiagarajan, Maharajapuram Santhanam, Madurai Somasundaram, Madurai T N Sheshgopalan, T.R.Mahalingam(flute), Mysore V. Doreswamy Iyengar (veena), Tirumakudalu Chowdiah (violin), T. N. Krishnan (violin), Lalgudi Jayaraman (violin) and other leading musicians in many concerts.

== Awards and recognition ==
- Kalaimamani (1963)
- Padma Shri (1973)
- Sangeetha Nataka Academy Award (1975)
- State Artist of Tamil Nadu (1979)
- Palghat Mani Iyer Award (1985)

== Legacy ==
CSM improvised the left hand playing technique with innovative movements of split fingers. He was renowned for his unmatched sense of pitch, tonal purity and meaningful silent pauses while following the main artiste. Clarity even during very high speed renditions was one of the hallmarks of his thani aavarthanes (solos). CSM also developed many unique patterns and lessons and established a new playing style. Some of his notable students include mridangum and kanjira maestro Sri. M.R. Venupuri Srinivas, Mavilekkara Shankarakutty Nair, Karaikudi Krishnamurthy (Singapore & London), Kumbakonam Premkumar (AIR Delhi), and B. Druvaraj (Bangalore). His most famous student was the Khanjira wizard G. Harishankar (AIR Madras). The Mridanga trinity influenced one another and drew inspiration by listening to one another. It is a fact that Palani Subramania Pillia, who rarely played the Khanjira in live concerts (although he was extremely good at it), played on a Khanjira only with two Mridangists. One of course was Palghat Mani Iyer and the other was C S Murugabhoopathy.
