= Yella Venkateswara Rao =

Indian classical musician and percussionist

- Born: June 2, 1947 (age 79); Andhra Pradesh, India
- Occupations: Classical musician Percussionist
- Years active: Since 1956 to now
- Known for: Mridangam
- Spouse: thrimurtulamma
- Parent(s): Rama Murthy; Mahalaxmi
- Awards: Padma Shri; Golden Lute; Hosha Banka Award; AIR Annual Award; Acharya Award; Thyagaraja Vamsi Award; GOA Best Teacher Award; Vishala Bharathi Gaurav Satkar; Ugadi Puraskar Award; Visista Puraskar Award; Kala Ratna Award; Bharathamuni Award; Viswa Saahiti Award

Yella Venkateswara Rao is an Indian classical musician and percussionist, considered by many as one of the leading exponents of Mridangam, an ancient Indian percussion instrument. He has performed as an accompanist to such renowned musicians as M. S. Subbulakshmi, Ravi Shankar, Chembai, Semmangudi Srinivasa Iyer, M. Balamuralikrishna, L. Subramaniam, K. J. Yesudas, Amjad Ali Khan, Hariprasad Chaurasia and Bhimsen Joshi. The Government of India awarded him the fourth highest civilian honour of the Padma Shri, in 2008, for his contributions to music.

== Biography ==
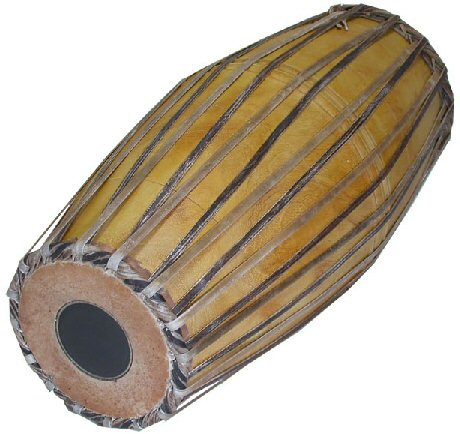
Mridangam

Venkateswara Rao was born in 1947, in the south Indian state of Andhra Pradesh in a family of musicians to Rama Murthy and Mahalaxmi. He started his music training at the age of 7 in vocals, violin and veena, apart from mridangam but, later, concentrated more on mridangam and trained under his uncle, Yella Somanna, a known mridangam guru, who later adopted the young Rao. On the academic front, he graduated in Arts (BA) and secured his master's degree in Public Administration (MA) and started his career by joining Potti Sreeramulu Telugu University, Hyderabad, as a faculty member. He worked at the university for 27 years in various capacities such as the professor and head of the department of Music and, later, as the Dean of the School of Fine Arts during which time, he is reported to have started several new courses at the university. Concurrently, he was also associated with the All India Radio, from 1963 to 1989, in capacities as an instrumentalist, staff artist, composer and mridangam artist.

In 1969, Rao, who is considered by many to have elevated Mridangam from its status of an accompaniment to the level of a solo instrument, founded Yella International Institute of Mridangam, an institution for promoting mridangam where training is imparted free of cost; the institution is known to have trained over 1500 students under gurukul system and has since been recognised by the Government of Andhra Pradesh. He is associated with Thakur Hariprasad Institute for the Mentally Handicapped, a non governmental organization for disabled children, and is researching the possibilities of music therapy, using mridangam. He is a former Asthana Vidwan (State Scholar) of the Government of Andhra Pradesh (1981–1985) and the incumbent state scholar at the Tirumala Tirupati Devasthanams and the Datta Peetam of Sri Ganapathi Sachindananda Swami. He is a life member of the Thyagaraja Festival Committee and a member of several organizations such as South Zone Cultural Center, Tanjavur and Srisailam Culture Centre, and educational bodies such as Board for Degree and Diploma Courses, Syllabus Committee for Technical Education and Sangeetha Academy of the Government of Andhra Pradesh. He chairs the Boards of Studies of Potti Sreeramulu Telugu University, Sri Venkateswara University, and the Government College of Music and Dance. He also sits in the syndicate of Potti Sreeramulu Telugu University and the senate of the University of Madras and is a visiting professor of Banaras Hindu University.

Rao has composed music for three Telugu movies; Sapthapadi, Viswamitra and Bhadram Koduko. He is reported to have performed on several stages in India and abroad, including Marghazhi Festival, a cultural festival of Andhra Pradesh. On 16 August 2011, the Department of Cultural Affairs of the Government of Andhra Pradesh organized an event at Shanker Mutt where Rao played mridangam continuously for 36 hours, which earned an entry in the Guinness Book of World Records. Nava mridangam, playing 9 mridangams at the same time, was another notable performance of Rao, which has been brought out as a video CD in 2011. He has accompanied the concerts of many renowned musicians on mridangam and has performed jugalbandis with musicians such as Sivamani, Zakir Hussain, Alla Rakha and T. H. Vinayakram. among others. A book written by him on the theory and practice of mridangam is a prescribed text for academic studies in Andhra Pradesh.

== Awards and honours ==
Rao has won several awards and honours, starting from the Golden Lute he received from Sarvepalli Radhakrishnan, then President of India, in 1961, for coming first in a music competition conducted nationwide by the All India Radio. The Jakarta chapter of the Asia-Pacific Broadcasting Union awarded him Hosha Banka Award, for his performance on multiple mridangams in connection with a program titles, Sivathandavam, in 1979. He received the AIR Annual Award for a similar feat, Nava Mridanga Sammelanam, held in New Delhi the same year. After he received the Gold Medal at the World Music Festival of Rome in 1981, the Telugu Association of Houston honoured him with Acharya Award and the Mayor of City of Temple, Texas, conferred honorary citizenship on him in 1985.

Rao, who received the Thyagaraja Vamsi Award in 1993, was selected as the Best Teacher by the Government of Andhra Pradesh in 1994. The Government of India awarded him the civilian honour of the Padma Shri in 2007; the same year as he received the Vishala Bharathi Gaurav Satkar of the Delhi Telugu Academy. He is a recipient of the DLitt (honoris causa) from the Jawaharlal Nehru Technological University and several other honours such as Ugadi Puraskar Award, Visista Puraskar Award, Kala Ratna Award, Bharathamuni Award and Viswa Saahiti Award, besides others.

== See also ==
- Khol
- Thavil
- Pakhawaj
- Tabla
