= Vellore G. Ramabhadran =

Indian mridangam player (1929-2012)

- Vellore Ramabhadran during a concert in Chennai
- Born: Gopalachari Ramabhadran; 4 August 1929; Salem District
- Died: 27 February 2012 (aged 82); Chennai
- Occupation: Mridangam Artiste
- Known for: Mridangam Artiste
- Parent: Konnakol T. P.Gopalachari,

Vellore G. Ramabhadran (4 August 1929 – 27 February 2012) was a mridangam artiste from Tamil Nadu, India. He was awarded Madras Music Academy's Sangeetha Kalanidhi in 2004.

== Early years ==
Born in Vellore, he showed interest in Carnatic music at an early age. His father Konnakol T. P. Gopalachari, a musician himself, was running a Music Sabha in Vellore. This sabha conducted competitions in Carnatic music among children. Maestros like Kancheepuram Naina Pillai, Palghat Mani Iyer and Pudukottai Dakshinamurthy Pillai judged competitors and awarded prizes. M. S. Subbulakshmi gave a concert in this Sabha in 1936.
Young Ramabhadran was fascinated by the music concerts and started learning the mridangam from his father at the age of eight.
During World War II people living in Madras (presently, Chennai) evacuated the city and moved to interior towns and villages. In 1942, Thiruparkadal Srinivasa Iyengar moved from Chennai to Salem. It gave an opportunity for Ramabhadran to learn vocal music from him.
Ramabhadran moved to Chennai in 1950 and took residence at Mylapore.

== Performances ==
In his first stage appearance, he accompanied Madurai Mani Iyer on the Mridangam. During the 1940s there were not many Sabhas in Chennai. He accompanied Madurai Mani Iyer in concerts held at various temples throughout Tamil Nadu.
Ramabhadran has performed as an accompanying Mridangam artiste to Carnatic music doyens Ariyakudi Ramanuja Iyengar, Chembai Vaidyanatha Bhagavatar, Maharajapuram Viswanatha Iyer, Semmangudi Srinivasa Iyer, Musiri Subramania Iyer, G. N. Balasubramaniam, (Madhurai Mani Iyer),K.V.Narayanaswamy, M.Balamuralikrishna, Maharajapuram Santhanam, T. V. Sankaranarayanan, T. N. Seshagopalan, B. Rajam Iyer, P. S. Narayanaswamy and to Illustrious Instrumentalists like T. R. Mahalingam, N. Ramani, Lalgudi Jayaraman, U Shrinivas and T. N. Krishnan. He has also performed with North Indian Music artistes Zakir Hussein, Alla Rakha, Amjad Ali Khan and Hariprasad Chaurasia.

== Concerts abroad ==
Ramabhadran went to United States for the first time in 1962 with Veena maestro S. Balachander, N. Ramani, and Umayalapuram K Sivaraman. They performed in many cities and universities from coast to coast.
He performed in the Festivals of India held in the U.K., USA and U.S.S.R.

== Unforgettable experience ==
Ramabhadran recalls performing a concert for the prisoners in the Palayamkottai Central Prison in 1948 is an unforgettable experience. He accompanied M. M. Dandapani Desikar in that concert.
Likewise a remarkable experience for him was the receiving of Sangeetha Choodamani award from the top Mridandam Vidwan Palghat Mani Iyer in 1975. The award was accorded by the Krishna Gana Sabha, Chennai.

== His thoughts ==
Ramabhadran opines that Mridangam is an accompanying instrument and it should not interrupt the main artiste. The Mridangam artiste can show his skill during the few minutes he/she is given for "Thani Avarthanam" (Solo interludes).

== Performance in Tamil film ==
Ramabhadran accompanied K. J. Yesudas on the mridangan for the song "Mari, mari, ninne" in the Tamil film Sindhu Bhairavi produced by K. Balachandar. The film scene shows actor Sivakumar as the singer and Delhi Ganesh as the mridangam artiste.

== Awards and honours ==
- Sangeetha Choodamani, 1975 by Krishna Gana Sabha, Chennai
- Sangeetha Kalanidhi, 2004 by Music Academy, Chennai
- Sangeet Natak Akademi Award, 1991 by Sangeet Natak Akademi
- Sangeetha Kalasikhamani, 1998 by The Indian Fine Arts Society, Chennai
- Sangeet Natak Akademi Tagore Ratna, 2012 by Sangeet Natak Akademi

== Death ==
Vellore G. Ramabhadran died on 27 February 2012, aged 82.

== Disciples ==
Vellore Ramabhadran has trained many mridangam players.One of them being Babu Rajasekaran, who accompanies Udaiyalur Kalyanaram Bhagavathar
