= Madras A. Kannan =

Indian Mridangam exponent (1920–2019)

Madras A.Kannan
- Born: 1920; Madras, Madras Presidency, British India (now Chennai, Tamil Nadu, India)
- Died: 1 April 2019 (aged 98–99); Chennai, Tamil Nadu, India
- Citizenship: India
- Occupation: instrumentalist
- Parent: Adimoolam
- Awards: Sangeet Natak Akademi Award; Kalaimamani
- Musical career
- Genre: Carnatic music
- Instrument: Mridangam

Madras A. Kannan was a Mridangam exponent from Tamil Nadu, India. Due to his outstanding performances in the field of percussion, he is often called as the Mrudanga Samrat which literally means "Emperor of Mridangam". He received several awards including Sangeet Natak Akademi Award and Kalaimamani.

== Biography ==
A. Kannan was born in 1920 in present-day Chennai, Tamil Nadu. At the age of six, he learned Mridangam from Peetambara Desai. Later he became a disciple of Thanjavur Ramadas Rao. Although he studied Veena and Carnatic music with Mridangam, he established himself only in Mridangam. His father Adhimoolam who played a major role in grooming him, was instrumental in making him concentrate only in mridangam. At the age of 12, he recited the Mridangam in front of Maharaja Krishna Rajendra Wadiyar at the Mysore Palace. In 1981, he was appointed as a state artiste by Tamil Nadu government.

Kannan has worked as a staff artist at All India Radio, Chennai and has also taught at the College of Music, Annamalai University and various private institutions. He has performed in various stages and provided extensive training to students, including sixth-generation students from South Africa.

Kannan, who stands out in the Carnatic music scene with his innovative style and rhythmic skills has many published recordings with famous Carnatic singers and instrumentalists from the country. He has played with noted carnatic musicians including Tiger Varadachariar, Ariyakudi Ramanuja Iyengar, Chembai, M. Balamuralikrishna, G. N. Balasubramaniam, Madurai Mani Iyer, Dandapani Desikar, Sirkazhi Govindarajan, S. Somasundaram, T. N. Seshagopalan, U. Srinivas, N. Ravikiran, Sriram Parthasarathy and Parur Sundaram Iyer. He was a regular participant in the Mysore Dasara Music Festival. Until 2017, Kannan used to attend concerts and later withdrew from concerts due to health issues.

== Death ==
A. Kannan died at the age of 99 on 2019 April 1, in Chennai, Tamil Nadu.

== Awards and honors ==
- 1971: Received title of Kalaimamani Award by the Government of Tamil Nadu, which is the highest state honour in the field of Arts
- 2004: Received Sangeet Natak Akademi Award 2004
