= Tiruvarur Vaidyanathan =

- திருவாரூர் வைத்தியநாதன்
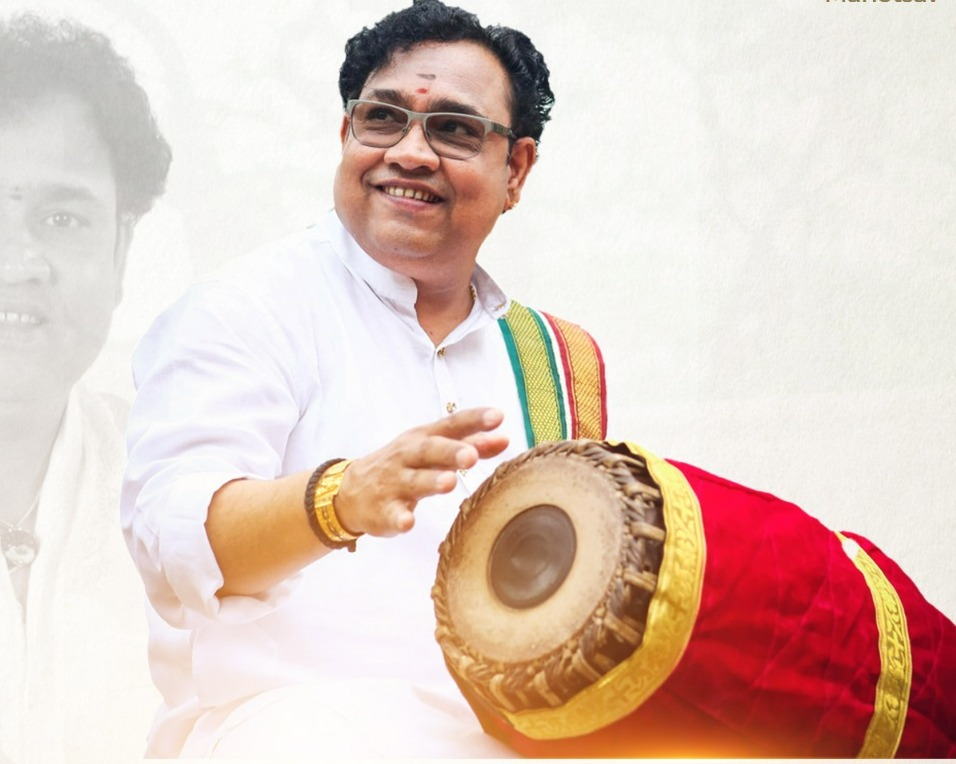
- Born: 11 May 1963 (age 62); Tiruvarur, Tamil Nadu, India
- Occupation: Mridangam artist
- Awards: Sangeet Natak Akademi Award (2017)
- Website: tvpschool.com

Tiruvarur Vaidyanathan (born 11 May 1963) is an Indian mridangam artist from a family of mridangam artists. He is a recipient of Sangeet Natak Akademi Award for his contribution to Carnatic instrumental music.

== Early life ==
Tiruvarur Vaidyanathan was born on 11 May 1963 in Nagapattinam, Tamil Nadu, into a family with a strong tradition in Carnatic music. He received his initial training in the mridangam from his grandfather, Tiruvarur Shri Kunju Iyer, and his uncle, Tiruvarur Shri Nagarajan Iyer, both respected percussionists of their time. He later underwent advanced training under the guidance of Karaikudi R. Mani.

== Career ==
A top-grade artiste of All India Radio, Vaidyanathan has performed extensively across India and internationally. Over the course of his career, he has accompanied several leading figures of Carnatic and Hindustani classical music, including M. Balamuralikrishna, Maharajapuram Santhanam, D. K. Pattammal, M. L. Vasanthakumari, T. N. Krishnan, Sudha Raghunathan, Aruna Sairam, Bhimsen Joshi, and Ajoy Chakrabarty.

Additionally, he has conducted numerous mridangam workshops in India and abroad and has several recordings to his credit.

== Awards ==
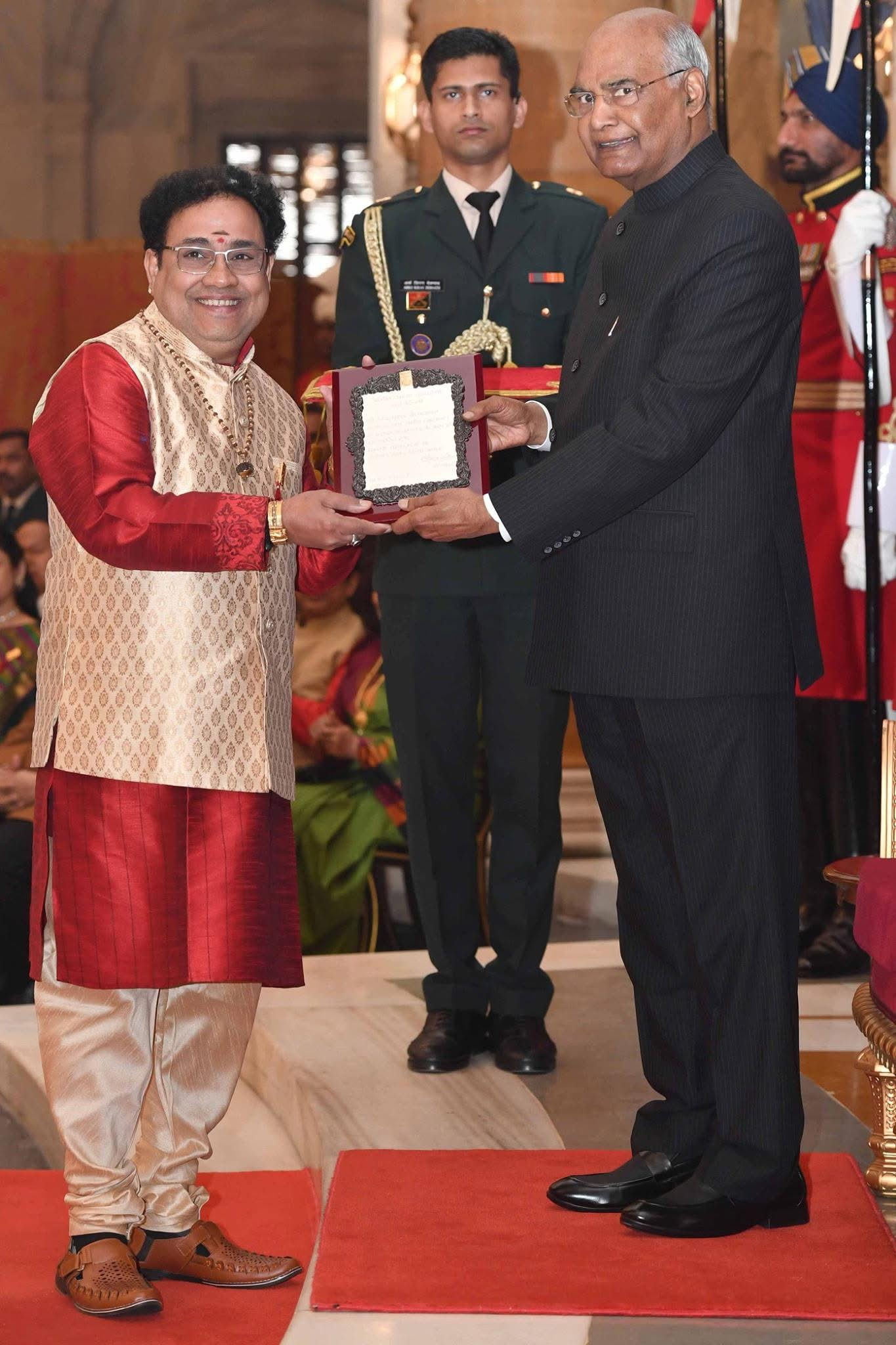
Vaidyanathan receives the Sangeet Natak Akademi Award for his contribution to Carnatic instrumental music.

- In 2017, Vaidyanathan received the Sangeet Natak Akademi Award for his contribution to Carnatic instrumental music.
- South Asian Arts and cultural Organisation's Vadyari award for promoting Indian Carnatic Music in Canada.

Additionally, he has received multiple honours, including the Yuva Kala Bharathi (1993), Asthana Vidwan of the Kanchi Kamakoti Peetham (2009), Acharya Ratnakara from the Cleveland Thyagaraja Aradhana (2016), and Vani Kala Sudhakara from the Thyaga Brahma Gana Sabha (2017).
