= K. Arun Prakash =

Indian musician and percussionist (born 1968)

Mridangam Vidvan K. Arun Prakash
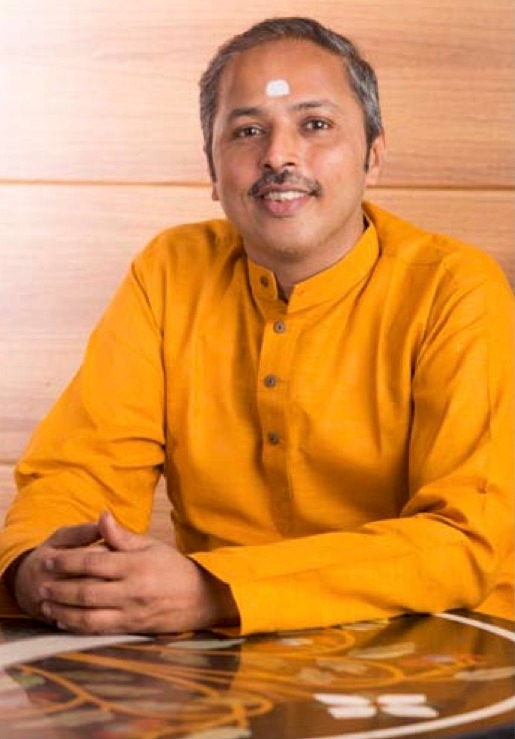
- Born: May 3, 1968 (age 58); Kumbakonam, Tamil Nadu, India
- Education: University of Madras
- Known for: Mridangam Carnatic Music
- Style: Embellishing and Highlighting the music

K. Arun Prakash (born May 3, 1968) is an Indian Carnatic musician, percussionist, and composer, specializing in the mridangam.

== Early life ==
K. Arun Prakash was born in Kumbakonam, Tamil Nadu, India, to Vasantha Krishnan and music composer L. Krishnan. His father, L. Krishnan, was a composer, arranger and disciple of musician and singer G. N. Balasubramaniam. Prakash began learning the mridangam at the age of nine under the tutelage of maestro Ramanathapuram M. N. Kandaswamy Pillai. He began performing in concerts by the age of 11.

== Career ==
Prakash has participated in jugalbandi (duets between two solo performers) and collaborative performances with both Hindustani and Western musicians, organized by the Indian Council for Cultural Relations and Sampradaya, Chennai.

Critics and interviewers have noted his use of silence and dynamic contrast in his performances.

He composed the theme music for the YACM Millennium Show, held at The Music Academy of Chennai, on December 31, 1999. In addition to accompanying leading Carnatic vocalists, he has contributed to numerous devotional recordings. Prakash has toured extensively, performing in the United States, Canada, the UK, Germany, France, Australia, Singapore, Malaysia, and the Middle East.

== Awards ==
- 1984 – First prize from Sri Krishna Gana Sabha during their Gokulashtami Series
- 1994 – Vishwapriya Award for Excellence
- 1996 – Yuva Kala Bharathi from Bharat Kalachar, Chennai
- 2000 – Kalki Memorial Award from Kalki Krishnamurthy Trust (first percussionist to receive this award)
- 1994, 1996, 1999, 2002, 2005, 2013 – Best Mridangist awards from The Music Academy, Chennai
- 2012 – Vani Kala Nipuna award from Sri Thyaga Brahma Gana Sabha (Vani Mahal)

== Works ==
- Arun Prakash has composed Tillanas (rhythmic compositions) and numerous Pallavis (thematic musical lines used in improvisation) performed by many prominent musicians.
- He conducted "AIKYA 2017" with Sudha Ragunathan and Aruna Sairam, designing, composing, and performing the performance with a 21-member orchestra.
- He released a CD titled "Sri Rama Jayarama", featuring compositions on Lord Rama by various composers, performed by 13 artists. Arun Prakash composed the musical interludes and oversaw the orchestration and arrangement.
