= G. Harishankar =

Kalaimamani G.Harishankar

Background information
- Born: Govinda Rao Harishankar; 10 June 1958; India
- Died: 11 February 2002 (aged 43)
- Genre: Carnatic music
- Occupations: Musician, instrumentalist
- Instrument: Kanjira
- Award: Kalaimamani Award (1994)

Govinda Rao Harishankar (June 10, 1958 in Chennai, India – February 11, 2002 in Chennai) was an Indian player of the kanjira, Khanjira or Khanjari, a tambourine-like frame drum used in the Carnatic music of South India. He is the only kanjira player to be awarded the Sangeet Natak Akademi Award, the highest national recognition given to performing artists.

== Profile ==
Harishankar received his initial training under his father Govinda Rao. (The Malayalam film singer and classical vocalist Govind Rao was a different person.) He later learnt under Ramanathapuram C. S. Murugabhoopathy and later under Palghat Mani Iyer. He was a staff artist of the All India Radio, Chennai. Some of his best performances in albums were with the Sruthilaya group along with Karaikudi R Mani on the mridangam, T. V. Vasan on the ghatam, and Srirangam Kannan on the morsing. He performed on several albums including Laya Chithra, Sruthilaya, and Grand Finale. He is considered by many as the greatest kanjira performer to date. 'Harishankar style of Kanjira playing' has become the benchmark for Kanjira playing and has been followed and adapted by Kanjira players worldwide.

G. Harishankar's main disciples are C. P. Vyasa Vittala, D.B. Sigmananda Bangalore Amrit & Nerkunam Sankar. They are performing in concerts regularly. They have been training many students & spreading the tradition to the next generations.

He had albinism.

== Death ==
G. Harishankar died of lung cancer when he was just 43 years old.

== Awards ==
- 1994: Received title of Kalaimamani Award by the Government of Tamil Nadu, which is the highest state honour in the field of Arts.
- 2001: Received Sangeet Natak Akademi Award.
