= Palani Subramaniam Pillai =

Palani Subramania Pillai
- Also known as: PSP or Palani
- Born: 20 April 1908
- Origin: India
- Died: 27 May 1962 (aged 53)
- Genre: Indian classical music
- Occupation: Mridanga artist
- Instrument: Mridanga

Pazhani Subramania Pillai (1909–1962) was a well known Carnatic music percussionist. Pillai and two of his contemporaries, Palghat Mani Iyer and Ramanathapuram C. S. Murugabhoopathy, are referred to as the "Holy Trinity of Mridanga". He was adept in playing the mridangam and kanjira. He was the sishya (disciple) and son of the celebrated Palani Muthaiah Pillai.

== Early life ==
Subramania Pillai was born on 20 April 1908. His mother was Unnamulai Ammal, and his father, Muthaiah Pillai, who was also a mridangist. He learned mridangam under the tutelage of his father and also had the friendship of ‘Thavil Panchami’ Malikkottai Panchapakesa Pillai. He was also influenced by a renowned mridangist at the time, Dakshinamurthy Pillai. Pillai in return showered great love and affection on young Palani, whom he looked upon as his own son. Before he turned twenty, Palani had the good fortune to accompany stalwarts like Kanchipuram Nayana Pillai, Mazhavarayanendal Subbarama Bhavathar and Mudicondon Venkatarama Iyer. In the next decade others who preferred his accompaniment were Chittoor Subramanya Pillai and importantly Alathur Brothers whose Guru (father of Alathur Subbier), Alathur Venkatesa Iyer was a great admirer of Palani. It was because of Palani that the brothers shifted base from Trichy to Madras and they made a great team. Palani is credited with composing a larger number of major pallavis for the brothers including their tempo and nadai variations. Later the team broke up (due to personal misunderstandings) much to the grief of a large number of listeners and especially Venkatesa Iyer. Iyer managed to effect a reconciliation after a decade of extensive effort and Palani did team up with the brothers but the old camaraderie was gone.

== Career ==
As Palani's playing in the early part of his career was robust and laya-oriented with extensive calculations, some vocalists of the time did not feel comfortable with him except for the few mentioned earlier. It was one of the most popular among the dozens of yesteryears, Chembai Vaidyanatha Bhagavathar (earlier responsible in advancing the careers of Mysore T.Chowdiah and Palghat Mani Iyer) who took to promoting Palani. There were multiple concerts in which he gave Palani opportunities to play three of four "Thanis" or solos in a concert. It is said that in a concert in Shanmukhananda Sabha in Bombay he asked Palani to play in each of the five nadais, Chatusram, Tisram, Misram, Kandam and Sankeernam. It was he who also persuaded Palani to tone down on the laya intricacies and increased the "sowkya" or aesthetic content in his playing. Palani, probably with considerable regret in having to shed his specialization and scholarship abided by his mentor's suggestion, not only because of the practicality but also because of his great respect for Chembai who was his elder by several years. Bhavagathar's advice stood Palani in good stead.

Eminently popular vidwans G. N. Balasubramaniam, Madurai Mani Iyer, and Semmangudi Srinivasa Iyer clamored to have him accompany him in their concerts. Of course senior vidwans of that era like Ariyakudi Ramanuja Iyengar, Maharajapuram Viswanatha Iyer, Chembai and Dwaram Venkataswamy Naidu ( Violin Solo ) had him as accompanist in multiple concerts. In turn Palani encouraged a number of younger vocal and instrumental artists including Dr. M. Balamuralikrishna, Ramnad Krishnan, M. D. Ramanathan, K. V. Narayanaswamy, Tiruvarur Namasivayam, Thanjavur Thyagarajan, Lalgudi Jayaraman and Palghat R. Raghu. While playing for younger artists he was never condescending but was always supportive and never tried to show off or intimidate. In fact although he possessed talents of gigantic proportions, he never indulged in exhibitionism and his only aim was to enhance the total appeal of the concert. Madurai Mani Iyer used to call him "THYAGI"- one who would efface himself so that the overall effect was sparkling rather focus on himself.

While Palani would highlight the different parts of the song such as "Eduppus" of Pallavi, Anupallavi, and Charanam with sufficient emphasis, he would rather follow the mood and trend of the song rather play the "Prayogas" of the songs themselves. This mode of playing gave a wholesomeness to the song renderings rather than the "Starts and stops" that would otherwise have arisen. His Sarvalaghu was the spontaneous flow of "Nadais", "Sollus", and "Sollukkatus" rather than any patternised formats. The Sarvalaghu used to be "Amorphous" rather than "Crystalline". Occasionally when certain arithmetic combinations arose, they too were spontaneous and blended seamlessly into the scheme of things. He specialized in "Vallinam" and "Mellinam" strokes in even the smallest passages. In layman's language these are Hard and Soft Strokes. His playing gave the effect of his indulging in a musical conversation with the main artist throughout the tenure of the concert. In his Solo interludes-"Thani Avarthanams"- he displayed both intellectual and aesthetic aspects in equal measure which pleased all sections of the audience but he never played to the gallery. The vocalist had to remain alert during the "Thanis" to ensure that he did not miss out on the "Thala"; such were the complex patterns he played! When Palani was present in a gathering there was no levity or frivolousness exhibited. According to Vidwans who shared the platform with him in concerts both his demeanor and playing was the epitome of "Gauravam" (Dignity).

His lifestyle in the 1940s and 1950s was the envy of other musicians. Always dressed in white muslin shirts and snow white Khadi Dhoti - carefully and painstakingly groomed - he was among the handsomest among musicians (others being GNB and Mayavaram V. R. Govindaraja Pillai). Unlike other musicians, he lived in a spacious bungalow and owned the latest model in cars (he changed them every two years). He himself drove the car and did not allow anyone else to drive his car.

Palani's partner in life was Rajammal (who along with her sister constituted a popular singing duo called 'Kolar Sisters' in her younger days). The pair had a daughter named Vimala. She married Srinivasan and they had five daughters named Banu, Malathi, Meera, Geetha and Vasanthi. They were brought up by Rajammal after the death of Srinivasan.

At any given time at least three to four students resided in Palani's house undergoing Gurukula system; with passage of time there were day-scholars also. Among the earliest disciple of Palani were T. Ranganathan (brother of T. Balasaraswathi) along with Ramanathapuram M.N.Kandaswami, Poovalur Venkataraman, Dandamudi Rammohan Rao, Pallathur C.T.Lakshmanan, Udumalai T.Mayilswamy, T.S Janakiraman among others. The most famous of his disciples is Trichy Sankaran who lives in Toronto, Canada. He retired as a Professor in the Music Department of York University. Palani took him under his wings when he was a child; Even at the tender of twelve Palani enabled him to play with him (double mridangam) in concerts of Ariyakudi, GNB, Madurai Mani Iyer and others. Among his later disciples were Erode Gururajan, Madirimangalam Swaminathan, K.S.Kalidas, Cuddapah Krishnamoorthy, A.V.Ragguprasad, T.V.Gurumoorthy and others. In turn, his disciples have trained multiple others and the Palani School is now well represented in India and abroad.

The founder of the 'Pudukkottai School of Percussion', Mamundia Pillai introduced Kanjira as an instrument in concerts; His disciples Dakshinamoorthy Pillai and Muthiah Pillai could play a large number of instruments like Mridangam, Kanjira, Thavil, and Ghatam. In their steps, Palani was also a GREAT Kanjira vidwan besides being a master of Mridangam. He has played with vidwans like Palghat Mani Iyer and Ramanathapuram C. S. Murugabhoopathy. His Khanjira performances were fewer (compared to Mridangam) and listeners thronged to these concerts whenever they occurred. Compared to the double headed Mridangam with its rich tonal quality, the single headed Kanjira with its limited tonal quality is more difficult to handle but Palani equaled or even excelled in duets with the best mridangists. Some of Palani's disciples have emerged as vidwans proficient with both instruments ( among them M.N.Kandaswamy and Palattur Lakshmanan).

At the behest of his father Palani erected a shrine on the Samathi of Mamundia Pillai at Pudukkottai in 1945. Till he died in 1962, Palani performed Gurupooja each year at this Samadhi on Mamundia Pillai's death anniversary. This is the day preceding the Aradhana of Saint Thyagaraja (which falls on Bagulapanchami day). After Palani's death his disciples took this over and also initiated the Gurupooja for Palani across different places in Tamil Nadu(M.N.Kandaswamy in Chennai, Udumalai T.Mayilswamy in Coimbatore, etc.).

In Kerala Palani ‘s disciples are KNS Namboodri, Karunakaran Pillai, and Thankappan. Mavelikkara Krishnankutty Nair considered him as his 'Manasa Guru'.
