= Semmangudi Srinivasa Iyer =

Semmangudi R. Srinivasa Iyer செம்மங்குடி ஸ்ரீநிவாஸ ஐயர்
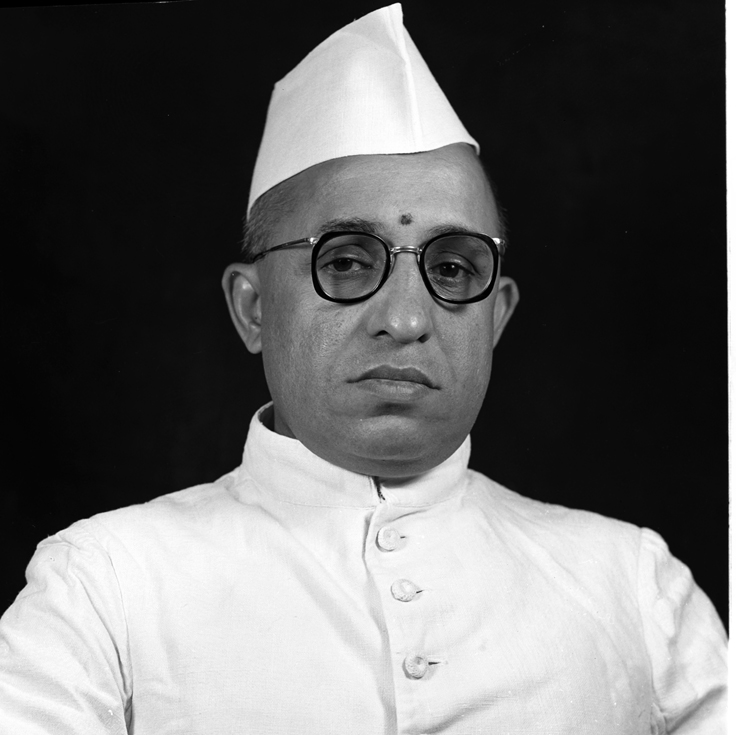

Background information
- Born: 25 July 1908; Tirukkodikaval, Tanjore District, Madras Presidency, British India (now Thanjavur District, Tamil Nadu, India)
- Died: 31 October 2003 (aged 95) Madras (now Chennai), Tamil Nadu, India
- Genre: Carnatic music
- Occupation: Singer

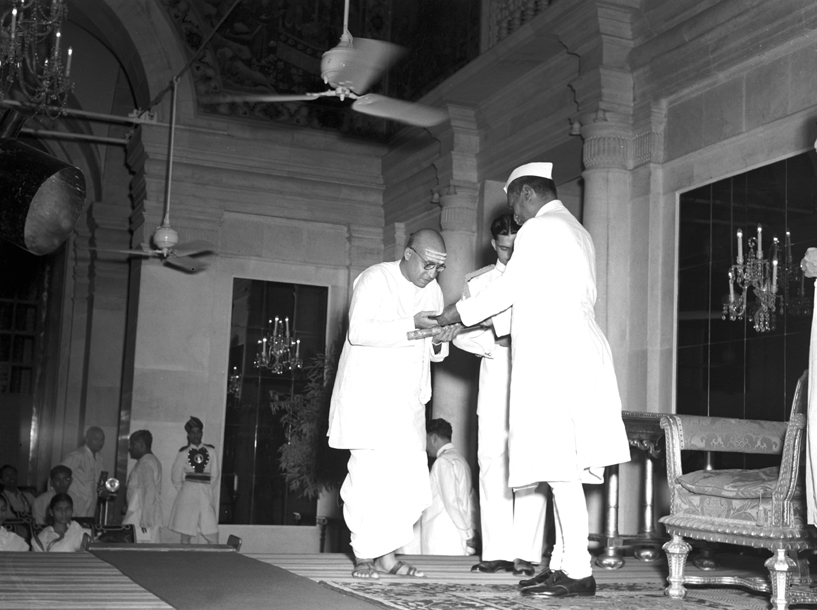
Iyer receiving Sangeet Natak Academy award in 1953

Semmangudi Radhakrishna Srinivasa Iyer (25 July 1908 – 31 October 2003) was an Indian Carnatic vocalist. He was the youngest recipient of the Sangeetha Kalanidhi awarded by the Music Academy in 1947, a distinction he holds as of 2026, being the only musician to receive that honour before reaching 40. He had received many other awards as well, including Padma Bhushan and Padma Vibhushan from the Government of India, Rajyasevanirata title from Travancore's erstwhile ruling family, Sangeet Natak Academy award (1953), Isai Perarignar from Government of Tamil Nadu and Kalidas Samman from Government of Madhya Pradesh. He was affectionately addressed as "Semmangudi Maama" (Semmangudi Uncle) by his disciples. He was also considered the "Pitamaha" or the grand sire of modern Carnatic Music. He was conferred with an honorary doctorate by University of Kerala in 1979.

== Early life and training ==
Semmangudi Radhakrishna Srinivasa Iyer was born on 25 July 1908 in Tirukkodikaval, Tanjore district, the third son of Radhakrishna Iyer and Dharmasamvardhini Ammal into a Tamil Iyer Brahmin family. He lived with his maternal uncle Tirukkodikaval Krishna Iyer, a violin maestro, until the age of four and after his death, moved back to his parents' home in Semmangudi, Tiruvarur District. At the age of eight he started learning music from his cousin Semmangudi Narayanaswamy Iyer. This was followed by some rigorous training under Thiruvadaimaruthur Sakharama Rao, a famous Gottuvadhyam exponent, an event considered by Semmangudi as a turning point in his life. This was followed by another training stint with Narayanaswamy Iyer, during which time he learnt a lot of varnams and keerthanams. He also learned under vocalist Umayalpuram Swaminatha Iyer. Then he had a musical apprenticeship with Maharajapuram Viswanatha Iyer. In 1926, he performed his first music recital at Kumbakonam. In 1927 he gave a concert in the Madras session of Indian National Congress, another event considered by Semmangudi as a turning point in his life, as it catapulted him into the big league of vidwans at that time. He was known for producing soulful music, highly creative and yet very orthodox, despite a recalcitrant voice.

He was instrumental, along with Harikesanallur Muthiah Bhagavathar, for the work on the krithis of Maharaja Swathi Thirunal Rama Varma. After attending one of his concerts in 1934, Maharani Sethu Parvati Bai of Travancore was so impressed by his talent and scholarship that she invited him to come to Thiruvananthapuram to edit and popularise the compositions of Swati Tirunal. He succeeded Harikesanallur Muthiah Bhagavathar as Principal of the Swathi Thirunal College of Music at Thiruvananthapuram, a post he held for 23 years, until the age of 55. At this age, he handed over his responsibilities to another Carnatic legend, G. N. Balasubramaniam and at the behest of the Government of India, became the Chief Producer of Carnatic music at All India Radio, Madras from 1957 to 1960. In later life, he concentrated on concert performances and tutoring youngsters. He gave public concerts even after the age of 90.

His institutional career

- Asthana Vidwan of Travancore
- Principal of Swathi Tirunal College of Music, Thiruvananthapuram
- Chief Producer of Carnatic music at All India Radio, Madras
- Honorary Director of the Central College of Music, Madras

== Concert performances ==
Semmangudi was widely renowned for his virtuosity as a concert performer. He was famous for the meticulous planning that he put into every concert, including the choice of krithis, raagas and duration. He was also widely acknowledged as a master of improvisation, particularly in the form of niravals.

Semmangudi was noted for his choice of songs, speed in rendering swarams and his ability to combine choice and speed with Bhakti. He performed with several violinists and instrumentalists, including Kumbakonam Rajamanickam Pillai, Mysore T. Chowdiah, Lalgudi Jayaraman, T. N. Krishnan, Nagercoil S. Harihara Iyer, and Nagercoil S. Ganesa Iyer. He was accompanied on the mridangam by percussionists such as Pudukottai Dakshinamurthy Pillai, Palghat Mani Iyer, Palani Subramaniam Pillai, Palghat R. Raghu, Mavelikkara Velukkutty Nair, Karaikudi Mani, Umayalpuram K. Sivaraman, Vellore G. Ramabhadran, Guruvayur Dorai, Trichy Sankaran, and T. S. Nandakumar. Some of his very famous renditions of kritis included Marubalka in Sri Ranjani raga, Chakkani Raja Margamu in Kharaharapriya, etc.

== Voice ==
Semmangudi was well known for his uncharacteristically nasal voice in an era when practically every prominent Carnatic singer had an impeccable voice. In his youth, famous kanjira performer, Dhakshinamurti Pillai commented to his brother and teacher, "His voice is as melodious as the noise created when a coconut shell is scraped on a rock. Don't bother to give him vocal training. Let him learn to play the violin." Despite such criticism, Semmangudi worked hard to improve his voice through practice and rigorous training. In the end, his natural talent for music emerged victorious over his deficient voice and he became a phenomenon in the Carnatic world.

His singing style has been widely followed, and his most prominent disciples include Sangeetha Kalanidhis, M. S. Subbulakshmi and her stepdaughter Radha Viswanathan, T. M. Thiagarajan, and violinist Prof. T. N. Krishnan. His senior disciples include P. S. Narayanaswamy, Sri K. R. Kedaranathan, Smt. Seetha Rajan, V. Subramaniam (a.k.a. Rajamani),Smt Parassala Ponnammal, K.J.Yesudas, T.M.Krishna, Trivandrum G Seethalakshmi Ammal, Palai C. K. Ramachandran, Mavelikkara Prabhakara Varma, Prof. Kumara Kerala Varma, Vaigal S.Gnanaskandhan, Smt. Meera Kedaranathan, Kadayanallur Venkataraman, V. R. Krishnan, Smt. Seethalakshmi Venkatesan, Smt. Radha Namboodri, Smt. Visalakshi Ramachandran.

== Family ==
At a very young age, he was married to Thayyu ammal. Thayyu ammal, he always acknowledged, was a pivotal factor in the success of his career. The entire family was run with stream line precision by Thayyu ammal, when he had to frequently travel for concerts and also spend most of his time involved in music.

- Sons – Swaminathan, Gopalaswamy, Radhakrishnan
- Daughters – Shantha, Dharma.
- Grand Children – Jayaraman, Hariharan, Sreeraman, Lakshmanan, Yoga, Bala, Padma, Anandhi, Sankar, Jayashree, Srinivas, Vivekanandan, Vidya, Jagannath
