= Patri Satish Kumar =

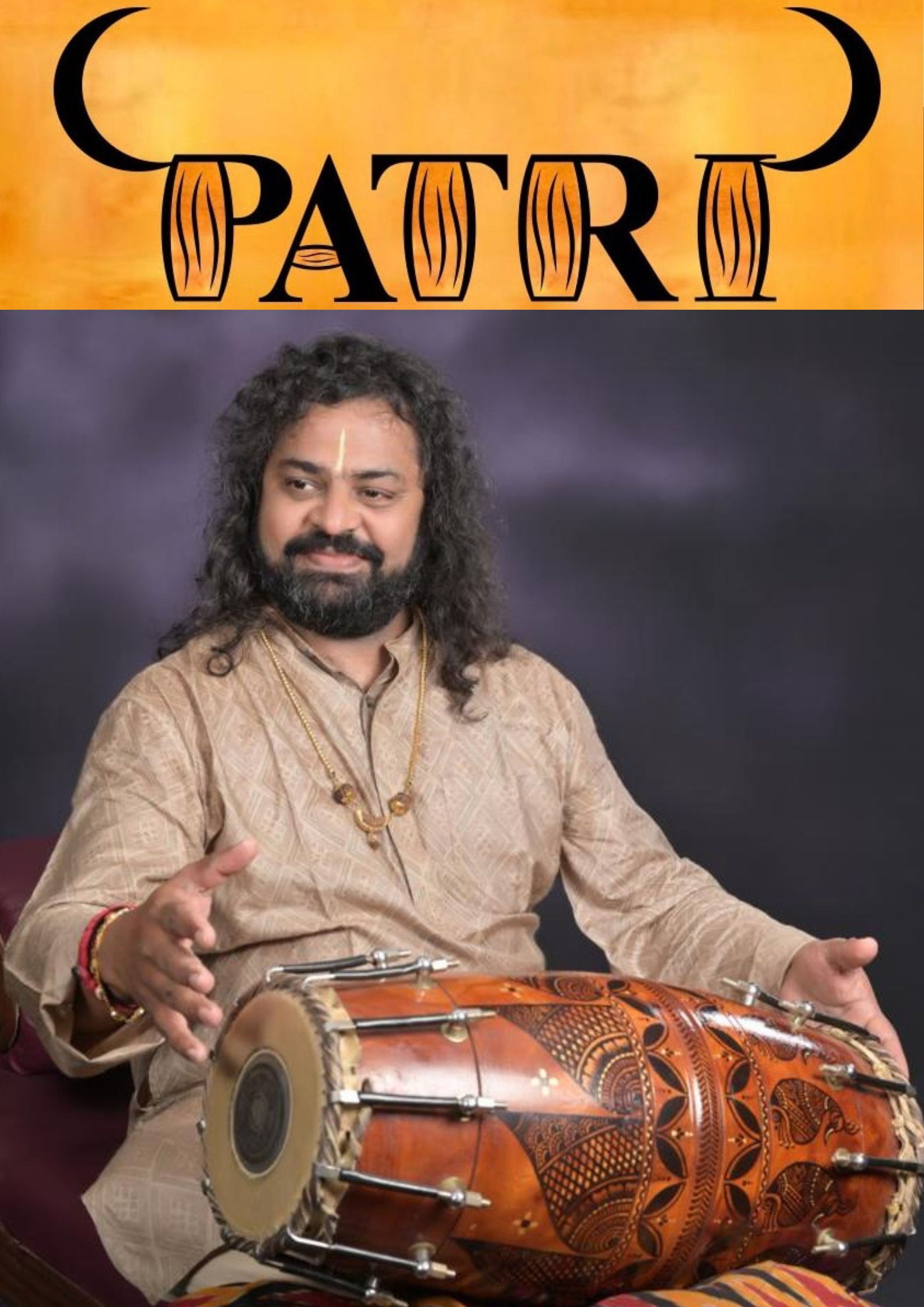
- Patri Satish Kumar
- Born: 3 August 1970 (age 55); Vizianagaram, Andhra Pradesh, India
- Parents: Smt. Padmavathi Kesava Rao; Sri Kesava Rao
- Family: Spouse; 2 children
- Honours: Sangeeta Natak Akademy Award (2020); Honorary Doctorate from University of California, Berkeley (2019); Vishwa Nadha Sagara (2019); Global Peace Award (2018); Sunada Sudhanidhi (2016); Lifetime Achievement Award (2014); Mridanga Nadha Mani; Navayuga Nandi (2008)
- Musical career
- Genres: Carnatic music
- Instrument: Mridangam
- Website: https://t.me/PatriSatishKumar

Patri Satish Kumar is an Indian Carnatic musician, specializing the Mridangam, an Indian percussion instrument. In 2020, he received the Sangeet Natak Akademy Award by the Government of India. Patri is also the 2018 recipient of the Global Peace Award from the Universal Socio Cultural Association in collaboration with Philanthropic Society India – International.

== Early life ==
Patri was born to musicians Sri Kesava Rao and Smt. Padmavathi Kesava Rao on August 3, 1970. He is a third generation musician, and was introduced to the mridangam at the age of 3 by his mother, a violinist from Vizianagaram. He gave his first public performance at the age of 7. His training was under three gurus – R. Sree Ramachandramurthy, V.A. Swamy and V. Narasimham.

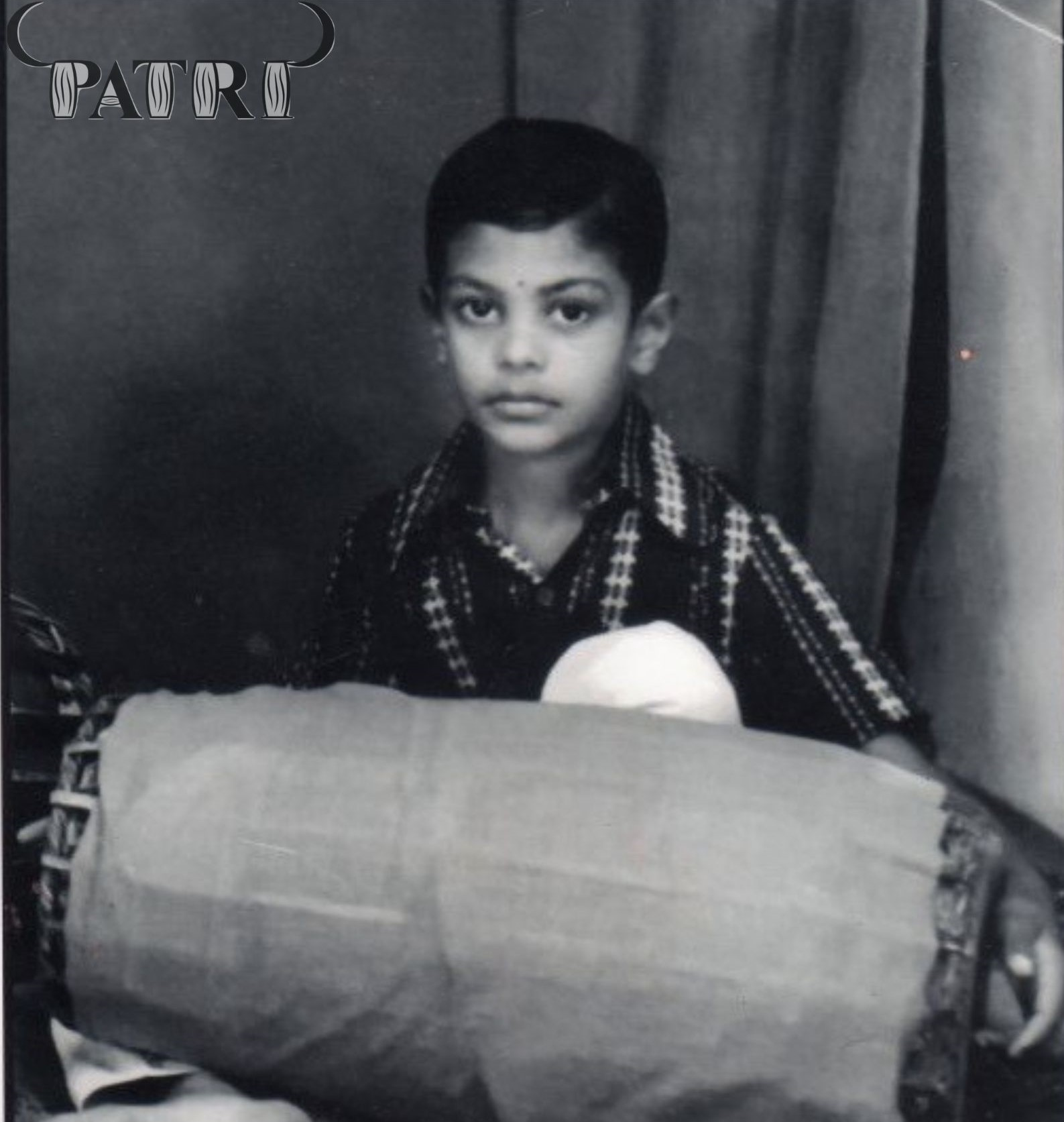
Patri at the age of 8

== Career ==
Patri is an “A-Top” graded artist of the All India Radio and Doordarshan with over 47 years of concert experience. His style is described as a balance between the treble and bass heads. Over the years, his syle has evolved to blends with various instruments and voices. A performer, composer and guru, Patri has brought new dimensions to the world of rhythm by reinventing "Yathi Praana Talas", “Kshetra Talas” & various other talas like "Misra Misrachapu" and so on. Some popular solos of Patri's include “Shanka Talam”, “Senavathi Talam” and “Sankeerna Chapu."

He has conceived a new concept titled “GAJAANA” - the ‘Gathi’, ‘Jaathi’ and ‘Nadai’ concept. He also introduced a path-breaking concept to the field of percussion through a blend of both Hindustani and Carnatic styles of playing. He has played also in many concerts all over the world. In this concept, the first half is played with a traditional Lehra, played from Vilambita to Dhrta, followed with the addition of Carnatic percussion. This entire concept adds a new dimension to Indian Classical percussion which Patri refers to as “Tradition to Addition”.

Patri is known to have changed the look of the mridangam with his ideas and is the creator of the “Designer Mridangams”, which meets all traditional values along with a contemporary classy look. These designer mridangams inspired Patri to upgrade his existing innovation into the new 2-part “TRI-M Designer Mridangam”, which has been often appreciated by musicians and audience at large. His maiden book, “PATRI…001 SIR (South Indian Rhythms)” features new age korvais (finishings) which was published in the year 2020 for the benefit of young professionals.

With an intent of giving back to the world of rhythm, Patri organizes his own music festival known as the Patri Drum Festival (PDF) – which features legendary and established percussionists. He has performed at venues such as Rashtrapati Bhavan, Kennedy Center, Lincoln Hall, Royal Albert Hall, South Bank Centre, The Menuhin Hall (Surrey), Music Academy (Chennai), NCPA Tata Theatre (Mumbai), Sydney Opera House (Sydney), Paul Getty Hall (Los Angeles), and Théâtre de la Ville. He has performed at music festivals such as Festival of France, Miami Beachfront Festival, Madrid Jazz Festival, India Gate Festival, and Harbourfront Festival. He has been a part of many musical confluences in Classical, Fusion and Jazz genres. His performances have been featured in many national and international broadcasts such as Radio France, Radio Germany, Radio South Africa, All India Radio and Ceylon Radio. He has received many awards because of these achievements and continues to carry on his legacy to the future generation.

Patri has performed in the presence of some saints of India such as Kanchi, Udupi and Sringeri Mutt Peethadhipathis and so on. He performed in many spiritual congregations including Brahmotsavams and Kumbhabhishekams of the ancient most temples of India, and Kumbhamelas and Pushakara Festivals of rivers Ganga, Godavari, Krishna and Kaveri.

== Awards and achievements ==
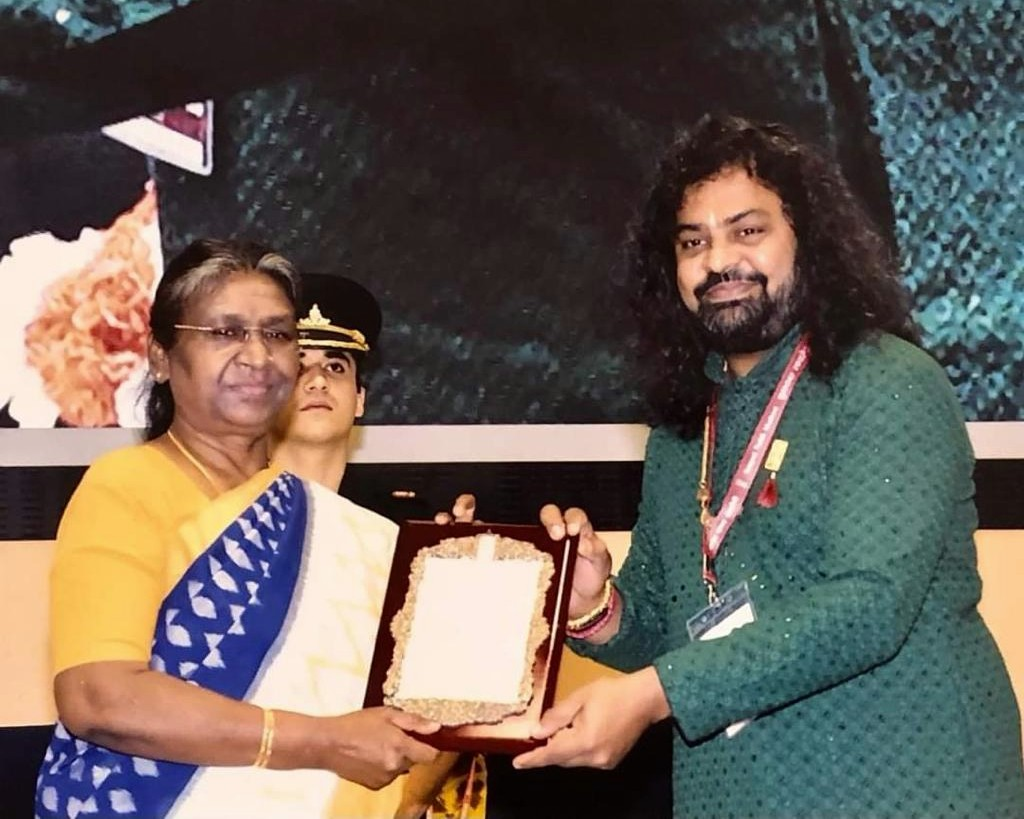
Patri Satish Kumar receiving the Sangeet Natak Akademi Award for 2020 from the President of India, Smt. Draupadi Murmu

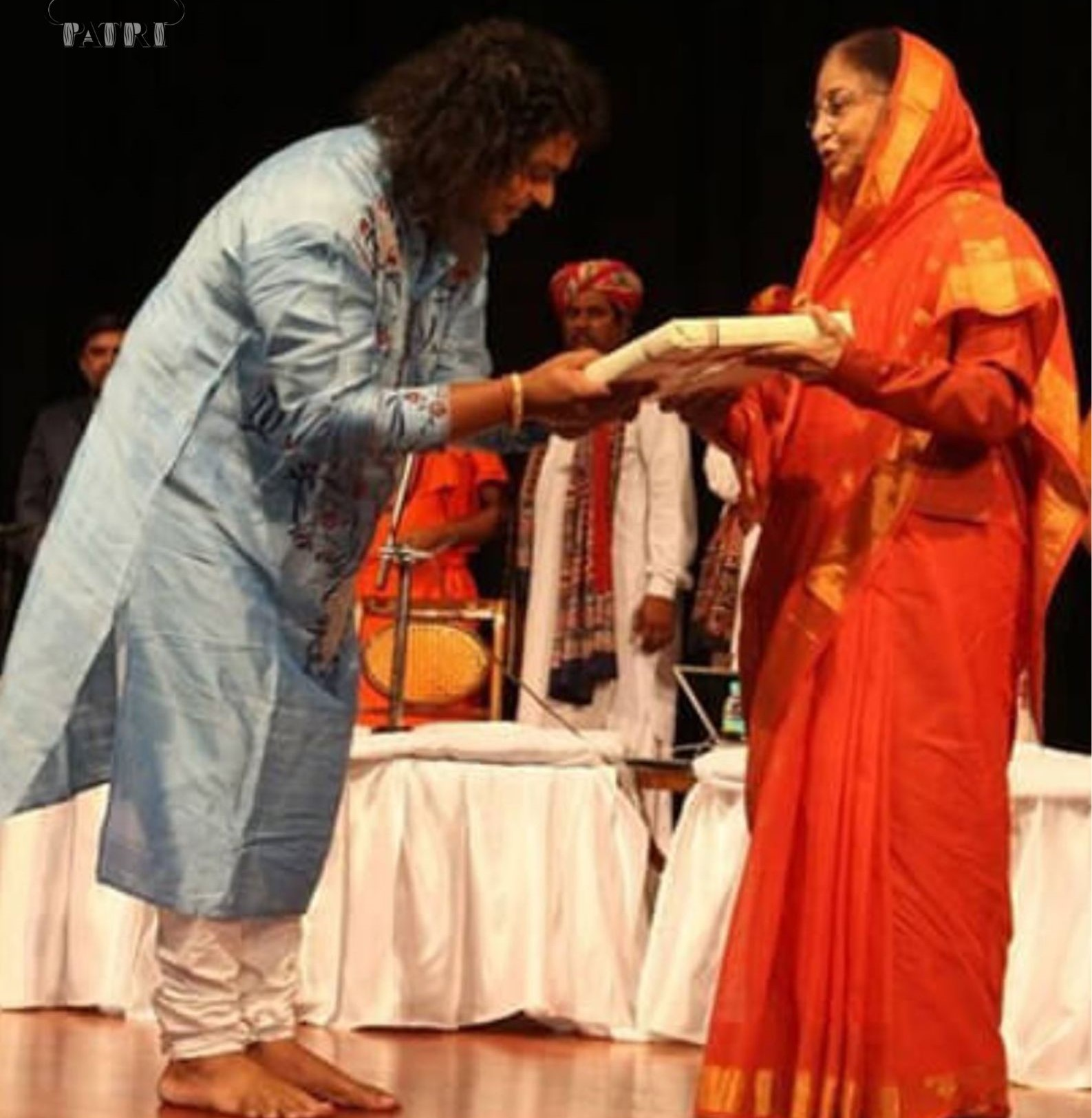
Patri Satish Kumar being honored by the Ex-President of India, Smt. Pratibha Patil

- Mridanga Samrat title - SAMPADA, Silicon Andhra - 2nd Apr, 2023
- Mridanga Soori title - Sree Kacchapi Kalakshethram, Sreekakulam - 31st Jan, 2023
- Mridanga Saarvabhouma title - Shri Vaaraahi Vedashastra Sangeeta Seva Trust, Hyderabad - 7th Jan, 2023
- Sangeeta Natak Akademy Award – 2020
- Vishwa Nadha Sagara title – Sampoornam Foundation, Chennai – 2019
- April 5 declared as "SATISH KUMAR PATRI DAY" by the Mayor of the city of Tempe, Arizona - 2019
- Shaarada Puraskar from Sringeri Sharada Peetham - 2019
- Global Peace Award from the Universal Socio Cultural Association in collaboration with Philanthropic Society India – International - 2018
- March 26 declared as "SATISH KUMAR PATRI DAY" by the Mayor of the city of Houston, Texas - 2018
- Vocational Excellence Award from the Rotary Club of Chennai for his contributions to the field of music (percussion) – 2017
- Sunada Sudhanidhi title - ‘Gayaka Sarvabhouma’ Sangeeta Parishat, Vijayawada – 2016
- Lifetime Achievement Award from Shanti Arts Foundation and Endowments, Chennai – 2014
- Mridanga Nadha Mani title – Kanchi Paramacharya Peetham, Kanchipuram
- Asthana Vidwan of Tirunelveli Shakti Peetham from 2008
- Navayuga Nandi title – Sri Siddha Bala Peetam, Kallidaikurichi - 2008
- Asthana Vidwan of Kanchi Kamakoti Peetham from 2006
