= Ramnad Krishnan =

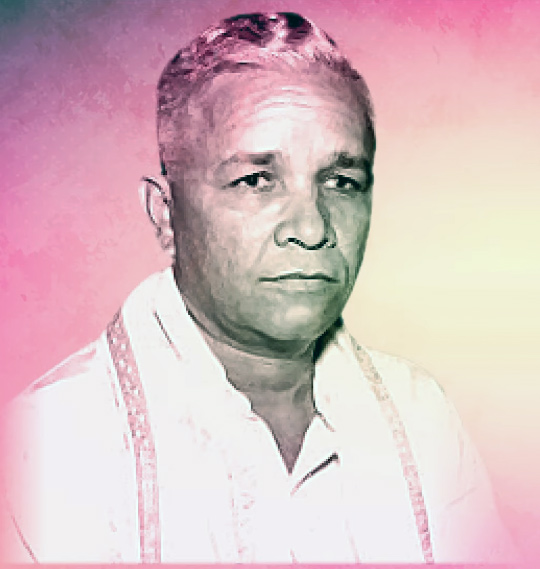

Background information
- Born: September 14, 1918; Alleppey,Kerala, India
- Died: January 29, 1973 (aged 54) India
- Occupation: Carnatic vocalist

Ramnad Krishnan (14 September 1918 – 29 January 1973) was a vocalist in the Carnatic tradition. Krishnan did his schooling in Ramnad in Madras Presidency. His elder brother Prof. V Lakshminarayana took him to C. S. Sankarasivam to get him started in music. Later, Krishnan's training under Smt. Brinda combined with his manodharma made many of his concerts quite memorable. His rendering of rakti ragas, notably Begada and Sahana and ragas like Madhyamavathi and Shankarabaranam, among others are unparalleled. He served on the faculty of Government College of Carnatic Music in Madras. He was also a visiting professor at Wesleyan University.

Krishnan came from a musical family (his elder brother was the singer and violinist Prof. V Lakshminarayana) and was one of the founding organizers of the Cleveland Thyagaraja Festival. His younger brother, the mridangist Ramnad Raghavan was on Wesleyan University's faculty. Violinists L. Vaidyanathan, L. Subramaniam and L. Shankar are his nephews. He recorded two albums for Nonesuch Records' legendary Explorer Series.
