= Dakshinamurthy Pillai =

Dhakshinamoorthy Pillai
- Born: 1875
- Died: 1936 (aged 60–61)
- Genre: Carnatic
- Occupation: Instrumentalist

Dhakshinamoorthy Pillai (1875–1936), was a leading mridangam and kanjira artist who accompanied musicians in Carnatic music concerts from 1875 to 1925.

Pillai took lessons from Pudukottai Manpundia Pillai and was influenced by the music of Thanjavur Krishna Bhagavathar, Thanjavur Pakkari and Narayana Pai. He was an ardent devotee of Lord Murugan and went on to become famous as Chinmayananda Guru. His pupils include Palani Subramania Pillai, Thanjavur Ramadas, Palghat Mani Iyer, Devakottai Sunder Raj, Paravur Kochu Govindan Asan (father of Paravur Devarajan) and Thangavellu Pillai of Malaya. His other important disciples were Madurai Thiruvenkatathaiyaa and Pudukkottai Dhakshinamoorthy Achariyar.

Thangavellu Pillai hailed from Trichy, India, and migrated to Malaya in 1927.

Trichy Thayumanavan, is a disciple of Dhakshinamoorthy Achariyar and is the grand disciple of Pillai. He married his guru's daughter Kanakambujam. He built a temple for Pillai at Pudukkottai and released a book, The Life History of Dhakshinamoorthy Pillai, in 1987 at Chennai Kabaleeswara temple. He celebrates the Guru pooja of Dhakshinamoorthy Pillai every Tamil month Vaihaasi, Shasti Thithi, and Aayilya Natchthiram at Trichy.
