= Thiruvarur Bakthavathsalam =

Indian musician (born 1956)

Thiruvaarur Bakthavathsalam
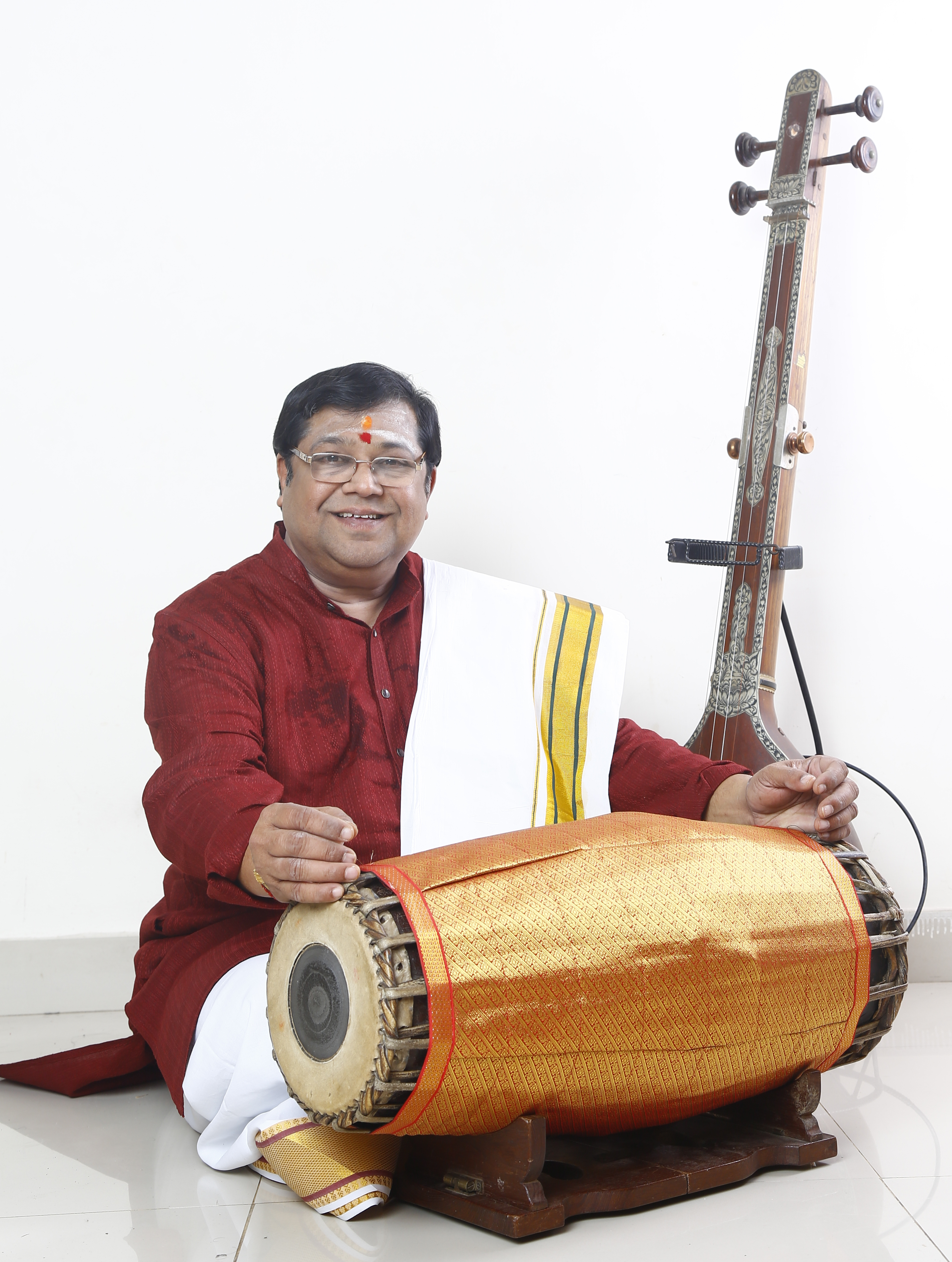
- Bakthavathsalam in 2016

Background information
- Born: 25 November 1956 (age 69); Thiruvarur, Tamil Nadu, India
- Genres: Carnatic music; Indian Classical Music
- Instrument: Mridangam
- Years active: 1965–present

Thiruvaarur Bakthavathsalam (born 25 November 1956) is an Indian mridangam Vidwan. In 2021, he was awarded the Sangeetha Kalanidhi award by the Madras Music Academy.

== Early life ==
Bakthavathsalam was born in the Tanjore district of Tamil Nadu, India, coming from a family of traditional musicians.

He started his vocal training under his mother, Sangeetha Vidushi Smt. T. R. Anandavalli. Later, he began playing the mridangam, a double-headed drum, under the guidance of his maternal uncle, Mridangam Maestro Thiruvaarur Sri Krishnamurthy, in gurukulavasam style.

He accompanied his mother in concerts from the age of nine. At sixteen, he moved to Chennai, the cultural hub of Carnatic music, and performed widely in all prestigious Sabhās and organizations.

He won several prizes in the Sabhas in Chennai as a young mridangist. All India Radio recognized his talent and gave him a double promotion from 'B' to 'A' grade, bypassing the 'B high' grade. Soon after, he attained the coveted top grade from All India Radio, making him one of the most celebrated artists at a very young age.

He played at the 1992 Summer Olympic Games opening ceremony held in Barcelona, Spain. Bakthavathsalam was interested in spirituality from a young age and visited several religious ashrams and mutts in South India. Over the years, he became very close to the heads of these institutions. He was conferred with the title "Mridanga Vadya Mani" by Paramacharya Sri Chandrasekara Saraswathi Swamigal of Kanchi Mutt, making him the youngest recipient of this award among many other veterans.

== Career ==
Dr. Bakthavathsalam has accompanied three generations of musicians throughout his career and has represented India in numerous cross-continent and cross-cultural festivals across the globe as an ambassador of Indian Classical Music. He has also performed alongside many veteran musicians from both Indian and Western music systems.

Dr. Bakthavathsalam has played in several fundraising concerts for various social and national causes, such as the Kargil Fund and organizations like the Shankara Nethralaya and the Cancer Society. He has also given many lecture demonstrations and concerts for the youth under the organization SPIC MACAY and represented ICCR in many musical ventures across the country and around the world to create awareness and interest in classical music.

Dr. Bakthavathsalam has received several accolades for his contribution to classical Carnatic music. He was awarded the Sangeet Natak Akademi Award by the President of India in 2006 and the Kalaimamani Award by the Government of Tamil Nadu. He has also been honoured by several Sabhas in Chennai and other places with Lifetime Achievement awards and titles.

He established a Carnatic music ensemble called LAYA MADHURAA ("Divine Ensemble"), which features traditional instruments including the Nadaswaram, flute, and percussion instruments. The ensemble performs at social functions.

Dr. Bakthavathsalam is the first classical artist in the South to have an exclusive fan club in Madurai, Tamil Nadu. His fans conduct music festivals, awareness programs, and other social events in his honour.

For over seven years, Dr. Bakthavathsalam served as Secretary of the Sri Kanchi Kamakoti Mummoorthigal Jayanthi Vizha festival, held annually at the Arulmigu Thyagarajaswamy Temple in Thiruvarur. This festival is a week-long event focused on Tamizh culture, heritage, and art. Numerous artists take part and perform compositions by historical composers and the trinity for attendees inside the temple premises.

In May 2010, during the 68th birthday celebrations of Parama Pujya Sri Ganapathi Sachchidananda Swamiji, a unique musical presentation called "Laya Madhura Mridanga Yagna" was organized at the Avadhoota Datta Peetham in Mysore. This musical offering was led by Mridanga Maestro Thiruvarur Bakthavathsalam and had 108 mridangam artists from all over India participating in it.

Maestro Thiruvarur Bakthavathsalam has also led similar concerts in India, like the 76-Mridangam Ensemble in Kanchipuram, which was held in commemoration of the 76th birthday celebrations of Pujya Sri Jayendra Saraswathi Swami, Kanchi Kamakoti Mutt, Kanchipuram.

== Style ==
He belongs to the Tanjore style of playing, but he has developed his own style that focuses on improving the entire concert, not just the rhythm. He is known for his energetic playing and his expertise in a variety of kritis and compositions. In 1984, Pt. Ravi Shankar invited him to join his ensemble for an international tour after hearing him play at the Music Academy in Chennai.

He has created his own music ensemble called 'LayaMadhura'. This ensemble is considered divine because it includes melodic instruments like the nadaswaram, violin, and flute, and percussion instruments like the mridangam, kanjira, ghatam, morsing, and tabla. All the artists in his group are highly skilled.

== Laya Madhuraa School of Music ==
Sri Thiruvaarur Bakthavathsalam is the founder and director of the Laya Madhuraa School of Music, which has its headquarters in Chennai, Coimbatore, and Toronto, Ontario, Canada. The school was inaugurated in 2000 with the aim of nurturing and training young talents in Mrudangam, the mother of percussion in the field of South Indian Carnatic Music. The school has developed systematic training methodologies and has successfully produced numerous Mrudangam artists worldwide.

Laya Madhuraa School of Music is presently working on conceptualizing innovative percussion ideologies and introducing the nuances of Layam and Nadhaam of the Mrudangam even to a common man to realise the values of Indian traditional arts. The school also actively organizes the LAYA MADHURAA SANGEETHOTHSAVAM every year in Chennai. During this festival, one Carnatic music veteran and one staunch promoter of Carnatic music are honoured for their contributions to music.

The festival also features a series of concerts on all five days by eminent musicians, promoting talented youngsters, and providing a platform for many promising young musicians to showcase their abilities.

== CD albums ==
He has to his credit two solo audio albums viz."Laya Madhuraa" and "Thala Bhakthi", and has also accompanied numerous cassettes and CDs for top-ranking artists. He has also released a CD "Rhythmic Symphony", a percussion jugalbandi with Pandit Anindo Chatterjee on the tabla. The latest twin CD album is the "Divine Ensemble" which is the new novel instrumental ensemble he has evolved with instruments like the nadaswaram, violin, flute, ghatam, kanjira, morsing, and tabla.

== Awards and accolades ==
Year	Award	Notes
	"Laya Chelvam" from Muthamizh Peravai presented by Former Chief Minister of Tamil Nadu "Kalaignar" Dr. M. Karunanidhi	
	Honorary Doctorate degree, International Tamil University, Hawaii, USA	
	Lifetime Achievement Award by the Santhi Arts Foundation & Endowments (SAFE), Chennai	
	Lifetime Achievement Award by Carnatica, Chennai	
	Kalaimamani from the State Govt. of Tamil Nadu	
	Sangeetha Choodamani from Sri Krishna Gana Sabha, Chennai	
2006	Sangeet Natak Akademi Award by the President of India	
2013	Lifetime Achievement Award by Bharatiya Vidya Bhavan, Chennai	
	Arsha Kala Bhushanam from Pujyasri Swami Dayananda Saraswati	
	Isai Chelvam from Muthmizh Peravai	
	Mridhanga Vadhya mani	
	Mridhanga Nadha mani	
	Tamizh Isai Vendhar, Kartik Fine Arts, Chennai	
	Mridhanga Kala Bharathi Gana Sabha Andhra Pradesh	
	Laya Vadhya Samarat Indian Classical Musicians Federation, Kumbakonam	
	Mridhanga Chakravathi by Nemili Bala Thirupruasundari Bala Peetam	
	Thala Vidhyadhara Sudha by Sakthi Arul Koodam Narpavi, Tambaram	
2021	Sangeetha Kalanidhi award from The Madras Music Academy for 2021.	
2022	Sastra Satsangh's Sangita Vachaspati Award	
2026	Padma Shri, Government of India	
