= Karaikudi Mani =

Indian mridangam player (1945–2023)

Karaikudi R Mani காரைக்குடி மணி
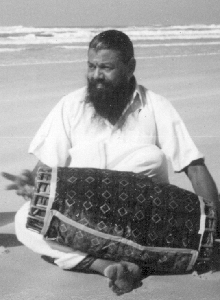

Background information
- Born: 11 September 1945; Karaikudi, Madras Presidency, British India
- Died: 4 May 2023 (aged 77) Chennai, Tamil Nadu, India
- Genre: Carnatic music
- Instrument: Mridangam
- Labels: His Master's Voice, Amrutham, Gita, AAO, Charsur

Karaikudi Mani (born Ganapathy Subramanyam; 11 September 1945 – 4 May 2023) was an Indian mridangam player.

== Early life ==
Ganapathi Subramaniam, popularly known as Karaikudi Mani, was born on 11 September 1945, in Karaikudi, Tamil Nadu as the son of musician T. Ramanatha Iyer and Pattammal. He became involved with Carnatic music at the age of three and soon abandoned his vocal training in favour of learning the mridangam.

== Career ==
Mani began performing regularly at a time when another player of the mridangam, his idol Palghat Mani Iyer, was in his prime. Mani first learnt music from Karikudi Ranga Iyengar and later took further lessons under the tutelage of Harihara Sharma after moving to Chennai. Karaikudi Mani received his first national award at age 18 from the then president of India, Radhakrishnan. In a 2015 interview, he said that receiving awards and titles had never been part of his agenda. In 1999, he accepted the national award from Sangeet Natak Akademi, presented by India's then president K. R. Narayanan.

=== Sruthi Laya ===
In 1986, he started an ensemble, Sruthi Laya, that combined melody and percussion. Three years later, he founded the Sruthi Laya Seva School that now has centres at Chennai, Bangalore, Australia, London, US, and Canada.

=== Thani Avarthanam – A Concept ===
Mani conducted and orchestrated several such concerts, notably a collaboration with Sri VS Narasimhan in 1990 called Melodyssey, a project with 40 artists, and including Western and Indian Instruments.

His next endeavour was the concept of "Thani Avarthanam" concerts. Whilst Thala Vadya (percussion ensemble) concerts in Carnatic music were not unheard of, the concept of just two percussion instruments performing solos without any other "sruthi" performers (e.g. vocal, violin) had never been attempted. In 1993, Karaikudi Mani presented his first Thani Avarthanam concert along with the late Kanjira player G Harishankar. It had revolutionised the role of the mridangam and kanjira, proving that as an art form, South Indian percussion instruments can be played as solo instruments in their own right. This concept initiated by Mani has since been undertaken by several leading mridangists who have also performed Thani Avarthanam concerts. Mani later conducted several such duet concerts featuring leading percussionists on Ghatam, Thavil, Chenda, etc.

==== International collaborations ====
Mani performed with many international artists such as Paul Grabowsky of Australian Art Orchestra, Eero Haemmeneimi of Finland Naada group, La Scala percussionist Elio Marchesini, Livio Magnini, Paul Simon, and with the Finland Philharmonic Orchestra. A piece called Layapriya was performed with the Finland Philharmonic Orchestra, which was later performed by the Battery Dance Company as a dance ballet. The Australian Art Orchestra had adapted his Bahudari and Ranjani compositions into Jazz style and released it as Into The Fire. The Naada group of Finland modified the Behag composition with jazz orchestration and released it as Unmatched. Eero Haemmeneimi named four of his compositions after Mani in his honor.

He also collaborated with Japanese musician John Kaizan Neptune to create an album named Steps in Time. In this album, Mani created a synthesis of shakuhachi and Indian percussion.

In 2011, he played on Paul Simon's album So Beautiful or So What.

Mani founded a magazine called Layamani Layam.
