= Mannargudi Easwaran =

Mannargudi A Easwaran
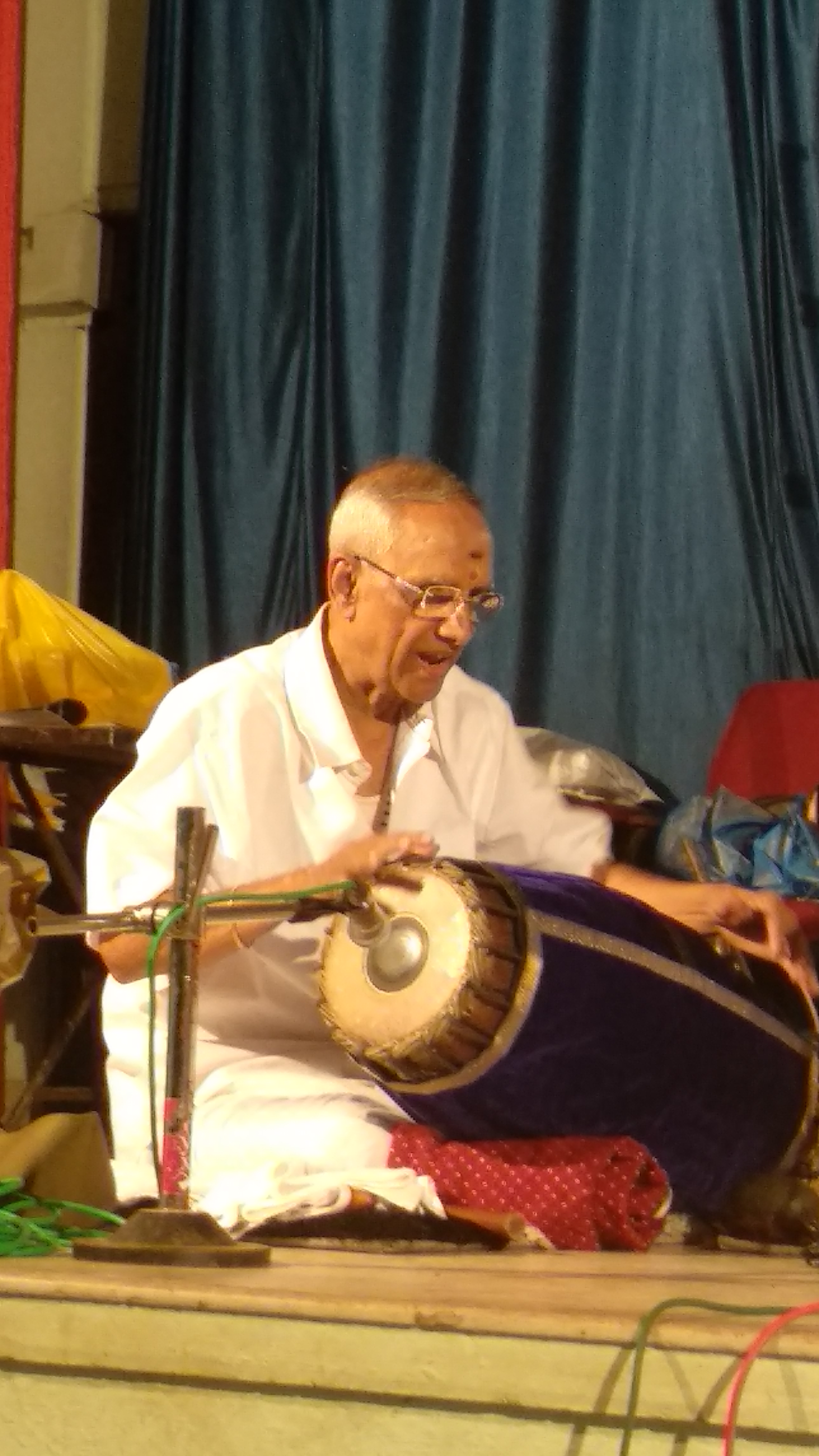
- Born: 1 April 1947 (age 79); Mannargudi, Tamil Nadu, India

Mannargudi Easwaran (Tamil: மன்னார்குடி ஈஸ்வரன்) (born 1 April 1947) is a leading contemporary mridangam player and Carnatic musician from India. He was a staff artiste of All India Radio and has received several awards, such as the Sangeet Natak Akademi Award (2008) and Kartik Fine Arts' Lifetime Achievement Award.

In the 2018 music season, Madras Music Academy dropped Easwaran from its programming due to allegations of sexual harassment against him.
