= Srimushnam V. Raja Rao =

Indian mridangam player and Carnatic vocalist

- Born: 1955 (age 70–71)
- Occupations: mridangam player and Carnatic vocalist
- Spouse: Padma Sandilyan
- Relatives: Sandilyan (Father-in-Law), Sean Roldan (Son)
- Awards: Kalaimamani Award (1999)

Srimushnam V. Raja Rao (born 1955) is an Indian mridangam player and Carnatic vocalist.

== Personal Life ==
Srimushnam V. Raja Rao was born into a distinguished family of court musicians, his father was S. Venkataramana Rao. He is married to Padma Sandilyan, a Carnatic vocalist, music educator, and daughter of the celebrated Tamil writer Sandilyan. Continuing the family's artistic tradition, his son Raghavendra Raja Rao is the acclaimed film composer and singer professionally known as Sean Roldan, and his daughter-in-law Lalitha Sudha is also an accomplished playback singer.

== Career ==
He received his initial training in Mridangam from his father S. Venkataramana Rao. He was later a student of Kumbakonam M Rajappa Iyer. He has also received training in Carnatic vocal music from eminent teachers including Sarvashri Papanasam Sivan, Calcutta Krishnamurthy, and Mayuram Vaidyanatha Iyer. He also plays the Kanjira and Morsing. He has worked as a visiting professor of Mridangam at the University of California, Berkeley, USA.

== Awards ==
- Award from Kanchi Mahaswami, 2010
- Sangeetha Choodamani by Sri Krishna Gana Sabha, Chennai 2011
- Sangeet Natak Academy Ratna Fellow from the Government of India, 2010
- Kalaimamani Award in 1999 bestowed by the Tamil Nadu Eyal Isai Nataka Mandram.
