= Palghat Mani Iyer =

Palghat T. S. Mani Iyer
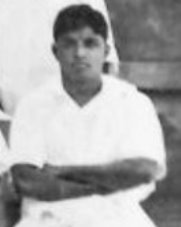
- Palghat Mani Iyer in 1943

Background information
- Born: 12 June 1912; Pazhayannur, Cochin State
- Died: 30 May 1981 (aged 68) Kochi, Kerala, India
- Genre: Indian classical
- Occupations: Mridangam artist
- Instruments: Mridangam
- Awards: Padma Bhushan Award by the Government of India (1971); Sangeet Natak Akademi Award (1956); Sangeetha Kalanidhi Award (1966)

Palghat T. S. Mani Iyer (1912–1981), born Thiruvilvamala Ramaswamy, was one of the leading mridangists in the field of Carnatic music. Along with two contemporaries, Palani Subramaniam Pillai and Ramanathapuram C. S. Murugabhoopathy, Iyer is revered as part of the "Holy Trinity of Mridangam". Mani Iyer was the first mridangist to be awarded the Sangeetha Kalanidhi (1966) presented by the Music Academy of Madras, the Padma Bhushan (1971) and the Sangeet Natak Akademi Awards(1956) presented by the Government of India.

== Early life and training ==
He was born in a Palakkad Tamil brahmin family on 12 June 1912 at Pazhayannur, then in Tiruvilvamala Taluk, in Palghat District, Kerala (now located in Thrissur District) to Sesham Bhagavatar and Aanandaambaal as their second son. Mani was named Ramaswami at birth— after his grandfather who was a school teacher besides being a good singer. Mani Iyer learnt his music from his parents in his native Pazhayannur. His maiden public performance was at the age of 10 at a harikatha discourse by Sivaramakrishna Bhagavathar. The mridangam player who was supposed to play had failed to turn up, and Mani Iyer substituted. Later he caught the eye of Thanjavur Vaidyanatha Iyer, who taught him the intricacies that invested his recitals with remarkable purity. Mani Iyer came into prominence in 1924, after accompanying Chembai Vaidyanatha Bhaagavathar in a music concert at Jagannatha Bhaktha Sabha in Madras (now called Chennai).

== Career ==
Mani Iyer accompanied all the leading vocal artists of his era. Before Mani Iyer's arrival in the music scene, the three mridangists Nagercoil S.Ganesa Iyer, Alaganambi Pillai and Dakshinamurthy Pillai (who played the kanjira also), dominated the percussion scene. The way in which Mani Iyer played changed the style of mridangam playing from just keeping beat for the main artist's music to being an instrument in its own right. A comment from Y. G. Doraisamy: "It was Mani Iyer who started the now prevalent trend of the mridangam, not just keeping the time with tekkas and moras, but actively accompanying the musical phrasing, so as to be a rhythmic running commentary, reproducing on the drum all the subtleties and rhythmic complexities of the musical composition."

Palghat R. Raghu, a disciple of Mani Iyer, describes his guru as a genius in that he showed music followers the manner of blending with the music of the main artist in handling the kritis of every conceivable mood and tempo. By his consistent excellence he could raise the concert to thrilling heights.

He had his eccentricities, and he refused to accompany women artists for a long time. But after his daughter married D K Pattammal's son, he accompanied Pattamal, considered one of the three singers who make up Trinity of Women Carnatic Music singers in the 20th century. Afterwards he also accompanied M L Vasanthakumari.

== Disciples ==
He was the guru for mridangam players such as Palghat R. Raghu, Mavelikkara Velukkutty Nair, Umayalpuram K. Sivaraman, Thanjavur R.Ramadas, Kamalakar Rao, G. Harishankar (kanjira) and Trivandrum V. Surendran among others.

== Personal life ==
Mani Iyer married and had five children: the mridangam player T. R. Rajamani, the vocalist Lalitha Sivakumar, the violinist T. R. Rajaram, Lakshmi Vaidhyanathan and Thyagarajan. His daughter Lalitha married I. Sivakumar, a son of the vocalist D. K. Pattammal. He is the grandfather of the vocalists Nithyasree Mahadevan and Palghat Ramprasad.

He died on 30 May 1981, aged 68.

== Legacy ==
When Semmangudi Srinivasa Iyer was asked to pick geniuses of Carnatic music, he came up with only three names -- T.R. Mahalingam, T.N. Rajarathnam Pillai and Palghat Mani Iyer.
