= Trichy Sankaran =

- Born: 27 July 1942 (age 83); Puvalur Thiruchirapalli, Tamil Nadu, India
- Instrument(s): mridangam, kanjira
- Website: www.trichysankaran.com

Trichy Sankaran (born 27 July 1942) is an Indian percussionist, composer, scholar, and educator. He was awarded the Madras Music Academy's Sangeetha Kalanidhi in 2011. As a mridangam vidwan, he has been called a "doyen among the percussionists of India" in Sruti magazine. Since the early 1970s, he has performed and recorded in a number of cross-cultural projects. In 2017, he was awarded the "Tiruchirapalli Carnatic Musicians Lifetime Achievement Award".

Sankaran has lived in Toronto since 1971. He is the founder of the Tyagaraja Aradhana in Toronto and is a professor of music at York University. He has regularly performed at all leading organisations in Chennai every December Music Season and continues to accompany a wide array of top ranked musicians.

== Early life ==
Born on 27 July 1942 in Thiruchirapalli, Tamil Nadu, India, Sankaran had his early musical training first under his cousin, P. A. Venkataraman, and later became the star disciple of the legendary mridangam maestro, Palani Subramaniam Pillai. He made his debut at the age of 13 in a concert given by the Alathoor Brothers at Nanrudayan Temple in the town of Thiruchirapalli. For Radha Viswanathan's wedding (daughter of MS Subbulakshmi), Semmangudi presented a concert for which Pazhani Subramania Pillai requested double mridangam and Trichy Shankaran was the second player at the age of 15.

Since then he has performed with many significant Carnatic musicians, including Ariyakudi Ramanuja Iyengar and T. R. Mahalingam. He won the All India Radio gold medal in 1955 and the President of India award in 1958.

== Teaching ==
Sankaran is the co-founder (in conjunction with vocalist Jon B. Higgins) of the Indian Music Program and a Professor of Music at York University in Toronto, Ontario, Canada, where he has been teaching since 1971. In addition, he has also conducted workshops and seminars at Wesleyan University, the Berklee College of Music, the University of Michigan, the California Institute of the Arts, the University of Illinois, McMaster University, Cornell University, and Dalhousie University. He has made valuable contributions at many scholarly conferences across North America and has also published a number of his works in the leading journals of the continent. He has also written a textbook on the mridangam, which defines the basic techniques and principles of Carnatic percussion, entitled The Rhythmic Principles & Practice of South Indian Drumming. In addition, in 2010 he authored a comprehensive textbook which focuses on the subject of solkattu (the spoken rhythms of South India) titled The Art of Konnakkol. Trichy Sankaran is also an avid world class clinician, and has performed workshops and clinics internationally. He has collaborated with top ranking drummers and percussionists, such as Steve Smith, Peter Erskine, and Giovanni Hidalgo, among others.

Sankaran is also the founder and artistic director of Kalalayam, an institution dedicated in cultivating the nuances and techniques of the Pudukkottai style of percussive embellishment. He has successfully trained many South Asian and North American students on the mridangam, kanjira, ghatam, tabla, and other Western percussion instruments. He was the pioneer in starting the Thyagaraja Festival in Toronto which has flourished into an annual event hosting a series of concerts featuring top ranked musicians from India, identifying and promoting talented youth in North America and endowing scholarships to students pursuing a career in music.

== International tours ==
Sankaran has performed far and wide at major festivals in India, Southeast Asia, Europe, the Middle East, Australia, and North America. With over half a century of concert experience in Carnatic music, he has accompanied over five generations of musicians.

== Awards ==
As a performing artist of international repute, Sankaran has received numerous honours and awards. The titles include:

- Sangeetha Kalanidhi (Madras Music Academy, India)
- Sangeet Nataka Academy Award from the Government of India
- Tala Kalai Arasu (Bharati Kala Manram, Toronto)
- Laya Sikhamani (Bhairavi, Cleveland)
- Nadha Laya Brahmam (Bharathi Vidya Bhavan, Trichy)
- Tala Vadya Prakasa (CMANA, New York)
- Mrdangavaibhavachudamanih (The Crest-Jewel of Mridangam Glory) from TSN's Percussive Arts Centre Inc (TSNPAC), New Jersey.
- Sangeetha Choodamani ( Sri Krishna Gana Sabha, Chennai)(1984)
- Viswa Kala Bharathi (Bharat Kalachar, Chennai)
- Mridanga Kala Shironmani (Percussive Arts Centre, Bangalore)
- Asthana Vidwan (Kanchi Kamakoti Peetam, Kanchipuram)
- OCUFA teaching award (Ontario Confederation of University Faculty Association, Canada)

He was also nominated as the Professional of the Year by the executive committee of the Indo-Canadian Chamber of Commerce in Toronto. He has received the prestigious Palghat Mani Iyer Award from the Percussive Arts Centre, Bangalore, the Chowdiah Memorial Award from the Karnataka State, and Sri Pazhani Subramania Pillai Award from the Chief Minister of Tamil Nadu. In 1998 he received an honorary Doctor of Music degree from the University of Victoria, in British Columbia, Canada, for his achievements in the academic and professional fields. He has also held honourable positions at The Glenn Gould Foundation and Canada Council.

== Work with ensembles ==
In addition to his usual traditional settings, he has performed with gamelan, jazz, electronic, and African music ensembles, and World Drums in fusion concerts. He has performed in jugalbandhi concerts with Ustad Vilayat Khan, V. G. Jog, Zakir Hussain, Hariprasad Chaurasia, Shanta Prasad, and Swapan Chaudhuri, to name a few. As a composer, Sankaran has to his credit numerous pieces in the genres of gamelan, jazz, traditional Western classical orchestra, and various instrumental ensembles respectively.

Sankaran has also worked in the fields of jazz, electronic music, and free improvisation with the composers David Rosenboom, Richard Teitelbaum, Charlie Haden, Pauline Oliveros, Paul Plimley, Rajesh Mehta the Jazz Orchestra of York University, Anthony Braxton, Dave Brubeck, Glen Velez, Nexus, and World Drums.

In 1996, Sankaran was commissioned by leading Canadian Bharatanatyam dancer Lata Pada, C.M., to compose a contemporary work entitled 'TimeScape', for her dance company, Sampradaya Dance Creations.

== Personal life ==
Sankaran lives in Toronto, Ontario, Canada. He is married and has two daughters.

== Discography ==
=== Released in North America ===
==== Instrumental ensemble/fusion ====
- 1975 – Suitable for framing – with David Rosenboom and J. B. Floyd (ARC Records)
- 1993 – Whirled – with Oliver Schroer (Big Dog Music)
- 1996 – Oliver Schroer and the Stewed Tomatoes – with Oliver Schroer (Big Dog Music)
- 1998 – Ivory Ganesh Meets Doctor Drums – with Paul Plimley (Songlines)
- 1999 – Catch 21: Trichy's Trio – with Suba Sankaran and Ernie Tollar (Deep Down Productions)
- 1999 – Innovative Music Meeting – with Rajesh Mehta and Rohan De Saram (True Muze Records)
- 2004 – Maza Mezé: Secrets Moon Magic – with John Wyre and Suba Sankaran (CBC)
- 2021 - "Speaking Hands"- with Curtis Andrews [The Offering of Curtis Andrews] (independent)

==== Traditional Carnatic ====
- 1990 – Laya Vinyas – Mrdangam Solo (Music of the World)
- 1993 – Sunada – with Karaikudi Subramaniam (Music of the World)
- 1997 – Lotus Signatures – with Dr. N. Ramani (Music of the World)
- 2001 – The Carnatic Violin – with Prof. T. N. Krishnan (Kriyative World Music)

=== Released in India ===
- 2001 – Kutcheri: Live at Kalakshetra – with Sanjay Subramanyan (Charsur Digital)
- 2002 – Mukhari – with Chitraveena Ravikiran (Rajalakshmi Audio)
- 2005 – Gajaleela – Mridangam and Kanjira Solo (Charsur Digital)
- 2007 – Kutcheri: Live in Chennai – with Lalgudi G. J. R. Krishnan and Lalgudi Vijaylakshmi (Charsur Digital)**
- 2007 – Live at Music Academy Madras – with Malladi Brothers (Rajalakshmi Audio)**

** – Forthcoming

== Books ==
- 1977 – The Art of drumming: South Indian Mridangam. Toronto: Private Edition
- 1994 – The Rhythmic Principles & Practice of South Indian Drumming. Toronto: Lalith Publishers
- 2003 – Frame Drums of South India: A Handbook on Solkattu (Rhythm Solfege). Toronto: Lalith Publishers.
- 2010 – " The Art Of Konnakkol (Solkattu)". Toronto: Lalith Publishers.

== DVD ==
- 2011 - "RhythmWise: The Art of the Korvai" (with Ken Shorley). Wolfville, NS.
