= T. N. Seshagopalan =

Madurai T. N. Seshagopalan
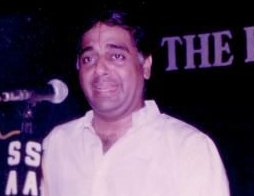

Background information
- Born: 5 September 1948 (age 77); Nagapattinam, Madras Province, Dominion of India (now Tamil Nadu, India)
- Genres: Carnatic music - Indian Classical Music
- Occupation: Singer
- Years active: 1970–present

Madurai Thirumalai Nambi Seshagopalan (born, 5 September 1948) is a noted Carnatic singer, musician and composer. He was awarded the Madras Music Academy's Sangeetha Kalanidhi in 2006. As well as being a master of the veena and harmonium, he is an exponent of harikatha.

== Early life ==
Though T. N. Seshagopalan uses 'Madurai' in front of his name, he was actually born in Nagapattinam, Tamil Nadu, as the son of Thirumalai Nambi Iyengar and Thiruvenkatavalli Ammal. He first learnt under his mother, and later under tutelage of Ramanathapuram C. S. Sankarasivan. He holds a degree in science from Madras University and a degree in music from Madurai Kamaraj University where he later served as professor of music.

== Music career ==
He is proficient in rendering Harikatha and performs as per the guruparampara of Harikesanallur Muthiah Bhagavatar. Seshagopalan continues to increase his wide repertoire with compositions of his own. He is noted for his own elegant thillanas, bhajans, namavalis and abhangs. He is equally at home with North Indian ragas and has participated in several jugalbandhis. Noted singer Gayathri Girish is his disciple.

=== Tours ===
In 1984 he was invited to sing at the Adelaide International Festival in Australia (and included performances Perth, Adelaide, Sydney and New Zealand). In 1987 he was India's cultural ambassador to Russia. He has performed in countries like Singapore, Malaysia, Bahrain and Sri Lanka and has visited and performed in the United States of America numerous times.

=== Film ===
In 1983 he produced and played hero in a Tamil movie "Thodi Raagam". He also acted as Prashanth's father in Jambhavan (2006).

The song "Innarul Tharum Annapoorani" is from the Tamil movie Athma (1993), directed by Prathap Pothan. It features Ramki, Rahman, Kasthuri, and Gouthami, with music composed by Ilaiyaraaja, lyrics by Vaali, and vocals by T. N. Seshagopalan. The song is a devotional piece dedicated to Goddess Annapoorani, expressing reverence and seeking her blessings. He sang karnatic classic songs along with K.J Yesudas in Sopanam(Malayalam) movie directed by Jayaraj.

== Awards and titles ==
- Harikatha Chudamani awarded by the Krishna Gana Sabha in the presence of Sri Jayendra Saraswathi of Kanchi Kamakoti Peetam Sep 2014
- Gayaka Sikhamani awarded by Chodiah Memorial Trust Mysore in January 2007
- Sangeetha Kalanidhi 2006 awarded by Madras Music Academy
- Padma Bhushan - 2004
- "SangeetaSaagara" by CMANA, NJ, USA 2007
- Sulakshana Gana Vichkshana - by H. H. Srimad Andavan Swamigal Srirangam - 1993
- Sangeetha Kalasikhamani, by The Indian Fine arts Society, Chennai - 2000
- Kumaragandharva Rashtriya Sanmaan - Kumaragandhrva Foundation Mumbai 2002
- Nadhabrahmam - Indian Fine Arts Texas USA - 2002
- Musician of the Year 1999-2000 by Sangeet Natak Akademi
- President Award 2000 - by Sangeet Natak Academy, Central Government
- Tiruppugazh Mani in 1964
- Gana Bhoopathi by the Tamil Sangam of Olavakod in 1967
- Sangeetha Kala Sagaram by Sri Jayendra Saraswathi of Kanchi Kamakoti Peetam
- Kalaimamani by Tamil Nadu Government in 1984
- Isai Selvam by Chief Minister of Tamil Nadu, Mr. Karunanidhi.
- Isai Kalai Vendan by Australian Foundation of Canberra - 1998
