= Jugalbandi =

Duet type in Indian classical music

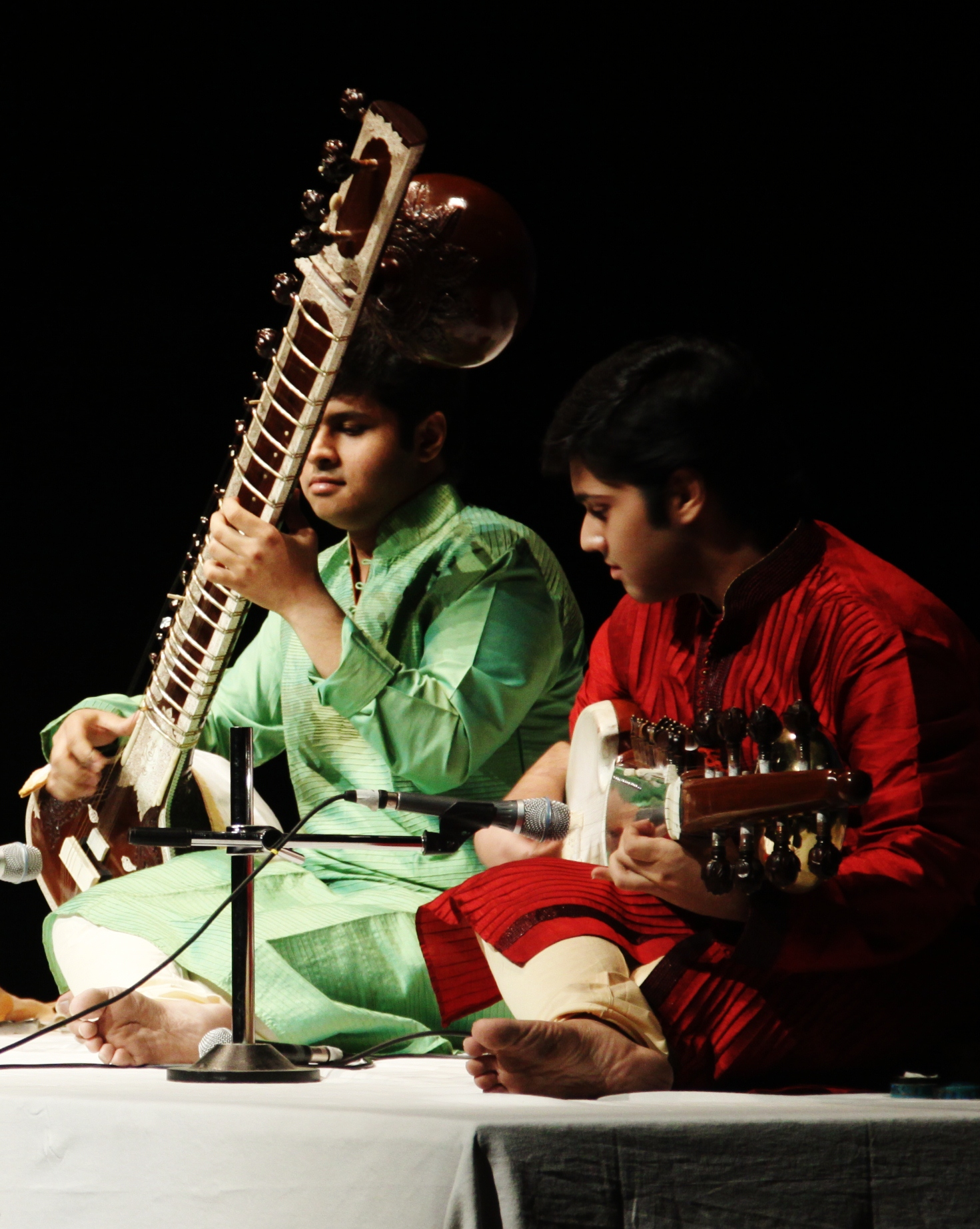
A Sitar - Sarod Jugalbandi

A jugalbandhi or jugalbandi (Hindi: जुगलबंधी; Urdu: جگلندئ‍; Bengali: যুগলবন্ধী) is a performance in Indian classical music, especially in Hindustani classical music but also in Carnatic, that features a duet of two solo musicians. The word jugalbandi means, literally, "entwined twins." The duet can be either vocal or instrumental.

Often, the musicians will play different instruments, as for example the famous duets between sitarist Ravi Shankar and sarod player Ali Akbar Khan, who played the format since the 1940s. More rarely, the musicians (either vocalists or instrumentalists) may be from different traditions (i.e. Carnatic and Hindustani). What defines jugalbandi is that the two soloists be on an equal footing. A performance can only truly be deemed a jugalbandi when neither musician is always the soloist or solely an accompanist. In jugalbandi, both musicians act as lead players, and a playful competition exists between the two performers.

== Hindustani-Carnatic Jugalbandi ==
Jugalbandi of Hindustani and Carnatic styles has evolved into a relatively common pattern that has the Hindustani artist accompanied by a tabla artist, and the Carnatic artist accompanied by a mridangam artist, and possibly also accompanied by tanpura. The main artists from each tradition present a composition in their own style and then together collaborate and present a common piece. The common piece is usually in a raga that is common to both traditions, such as Yaman-Kalyani, Bhairavi-Sindhubhairavi , Keeravani.

== Jasrangi ==
Jasrangi is a novel form of Jugalbandi. Pandit Jasraj is credited as the inventor of this new form of Jugalbandi. In Jasrangi Jugalbandi a male and a female vocalist sing two different ragas at the same time in two different scales, based on the Moorchhana principle of Indian classical music. The two singers give prominence to the Shadja-Madhyam and Shadja-Pancham Bhav, with the ‘ma’ note of the female voice becoming the ‘sa’ of the male voice, and the male ‘pa’ becoming the female ‘sa’. Since both the singers sing in their own pitch the tonal quality in the music is not lost.
