= List of Carnatic instrumentalists =

This is a list of Carnatic instrumentalists: musicians famous for playing the carnatic music of South India. Musicians are listed by the instrument they have played.

== Bowed strings ==
=== Violin ===
- Lalgudi Jayaraman
- Kunnakudi Vaidyanathan
- Tirumakudalu Chowdiah
- Dwaram Venkataswamy Naidu
- M. S. Gopalakrishnan
- T. N. Krishnan
- H.K. Venkatram
- L. Vaidyanathan
- L. Subramaniam
- L. Shankar
- Mysore brothers - Mysore Nagaraj & Dr. Mysore Manjunath
- Embar Kannan
- G. J. R. Krishnan and Lalgudi Vijayalakshmi
- Ragini Shankar
- A. Kanyakumari
- Ganesh and Kumaresh
- M. Narmadha
- Vittal Ramamurthy
- V. V. Ravi
- Nedumangad Sivanandan
- Delhi P. Sunder Rajan
- B. Sasikumar
- Gingger Shankar
- Jyotsna Srikanth
- Balabhaskar
- Abhijith P. S. Nair
- Ambi Subramaniam

== Plucked strings ==
=== Veena ===
- Karaikudi Sambasiva Iyer
- Challapally Chitti Babu
- Emani Sankara Sastry
- S. Balachander
- Doraiswamy Iyengar
- E. Gayathri
- Jayanthi Kumaresh
- Kalpakam Swaminathan
- Ranganayaki Rajagopalan
- Rajhesh Vaidhya
- Revathy Krishna

=== Mandolin ===
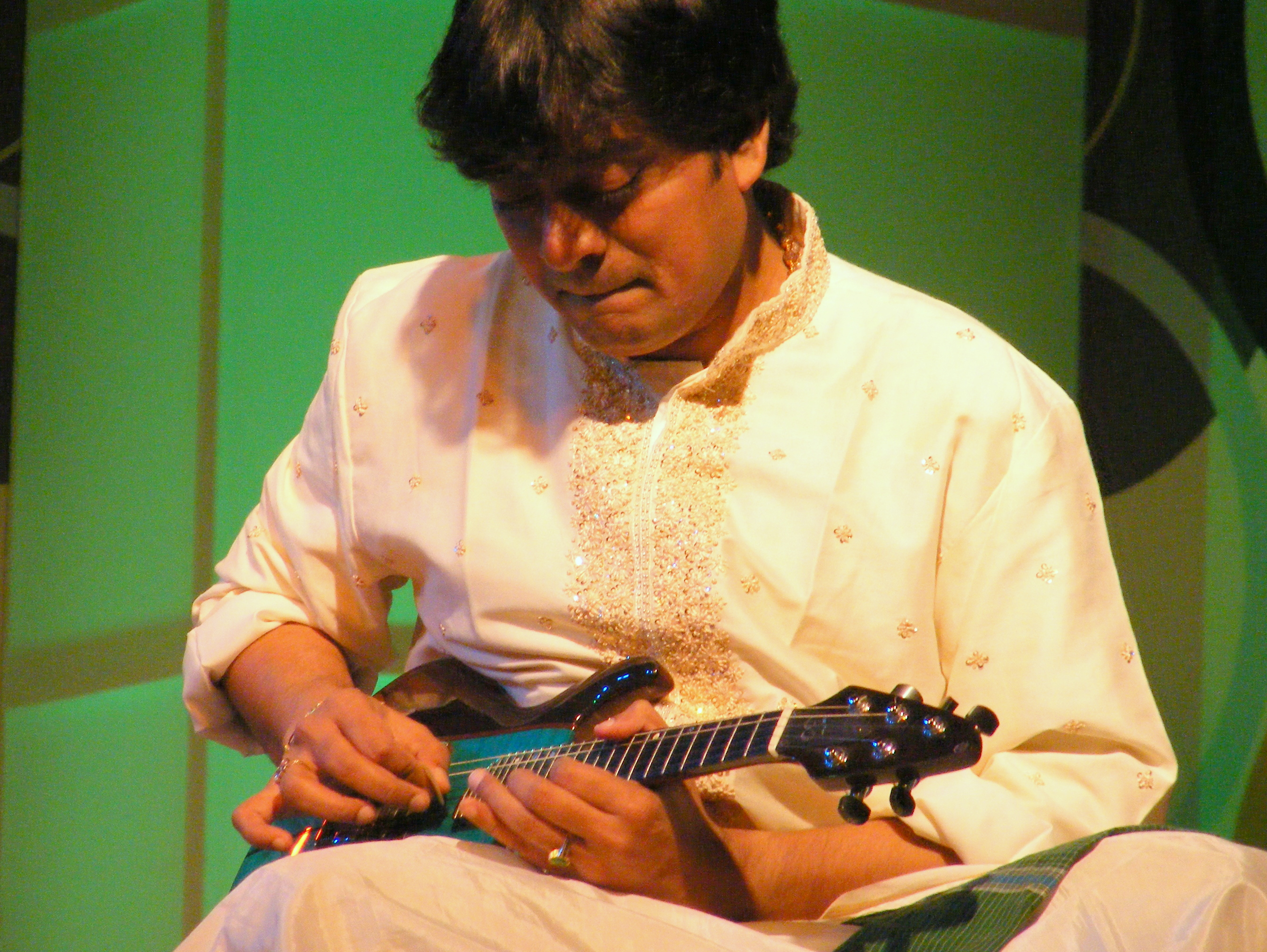
U. Srinivas playing a mandolin

- U. Srinivas

=== Chitra veena ===
- N. Ravikiran

=== Guitar ===
- R. Prasanna
- Sukumar Prasad

== Winds ==
=== Venu ===
- T. R. Mahalingam
- N. Ramani
- Prapancham Sitaram
- Shashank
- K. Bhaskaran
- T. Viswanathan
- B. Shankar Rao
- Tiruchy L. Saravanan

=== Nadaswaram ===
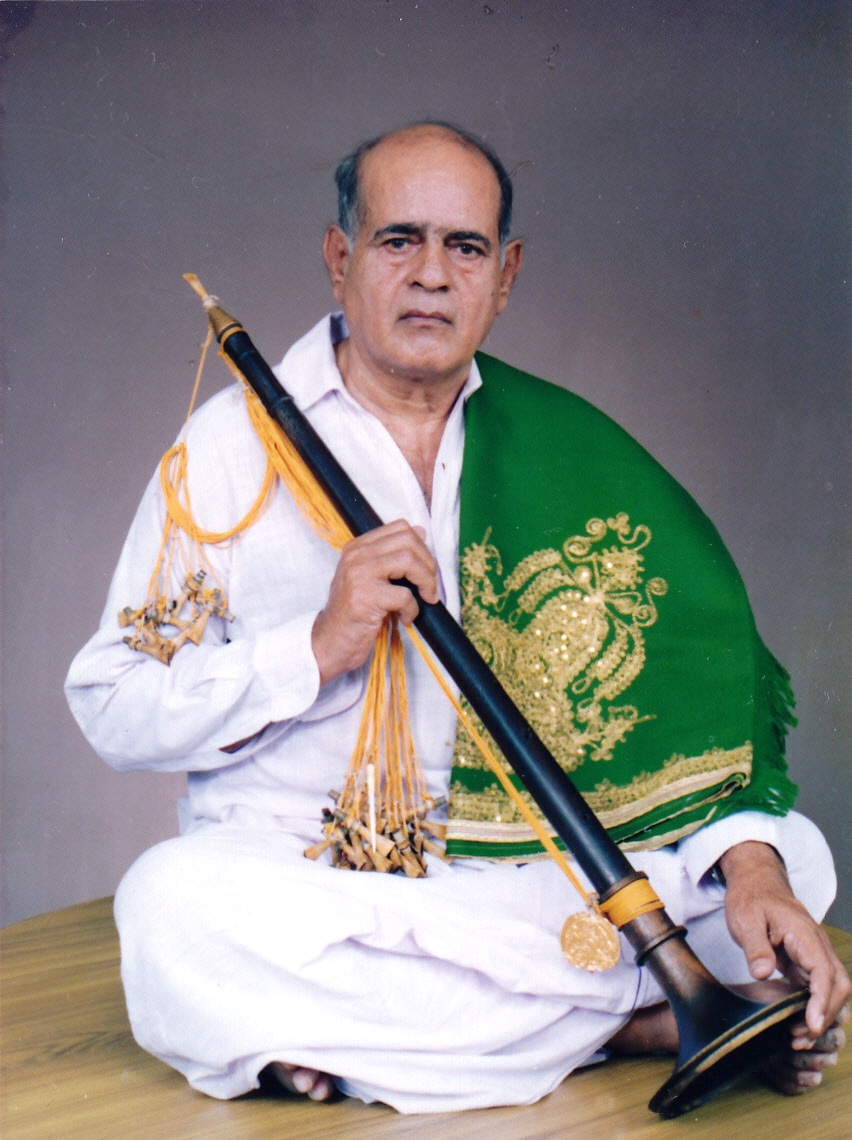
Sheik Chinna Moulana with a Nadaswaram

- T.N. Rajarathnam Pillai
- Namagiripettai Krishnan
- Sheik Chinna Moulana
- Sheik Mahaboob Subhani

=== Saxophone ===
- Kadri Gopalnath

== Percussions ==
=== Piano ===
- Anil Srinivasan

=== Mridangam ===
- Palghat Mani Iyer
- Palghat R. Raghu
- Vellore G. Ramabhadran
- Mavelikkara Velukkutty Nair
- Umayalpuram K. Sivaraman
- Trichy Sankaran
- Karaikudi Mani
- Ramnad V. Raghavan
- T. Ranganathan
- Palani Subramaniam Pillai
- Mannargudi Easwaran
- Guruvayur Dorai
- T. V. Gopalakrishnan
- Ramesh Srinivasan
- Patri Satish Kumar
- Erickavu N. Sunil
- Thiruvarur Bakthavathsalam

=== Ghatam ===
- T. H. "Vikku" Vinayakram
- Ghatam Udupa

=== Kanjira ===
- G. Harishankar
- V. Selvaganesh

=== Thavil ===
- Haridwaramangalam A. K. Palanivel

=== Morsing (jaw harp) ===
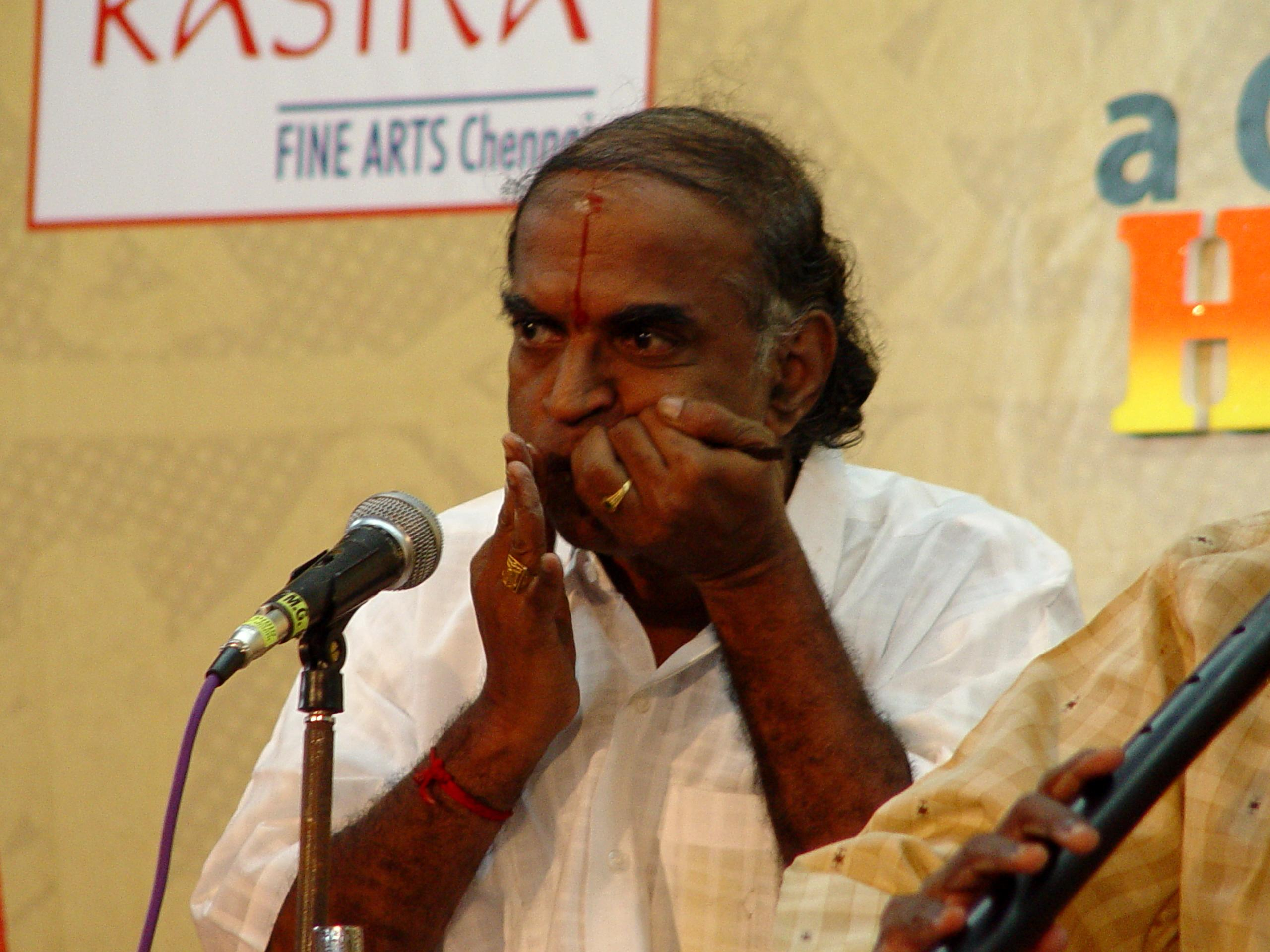
Srirangam Kannan playing a morsing

- Srirangam Kannan

== Other ==
=== Idakka ===
- Tripunithura Krishnadas

=== Jaltarang ===
- Anayampatti S. Ganesan
- Seethalakshmi Doraiswamy

=== Santoor ===
- R. Visweswaran

== See also ==
- Carnatic music
- South India
