= Manakkal Rangarajan =

Carnatic music singer (1922–2019)

Manakkal Rangarajan (13 September 1922 - 26 February 2019) was a Carnatic music singer who hailed from the village of Manakkal in Trichy District. His father was the late Santhana Krishna Bhagavathar. He had been singing for more than six decades and was performing even past his 80th year. He died in his 96th year of life on 26 February 2019 due to old age ailments.

== Performing Style ==
He was a specialist in brigas, rare ragas and pallavis. He had performed all over India and abroad and had been accompanied by vidwans like Mysore T. Chowdiah, Kumbakonam Rajamanickam Pillai, Palghat Mani Iyer, Nagercoil Ganesa iyer and Palani Subramaniam Pillai.

Rangarajan had performed at Saint Tyagaraja music festival at Thiruvaiyaru for the past sixty years without a gap. He is the only musician who has sung in AIR Chennai since its inception without repeating a single song. Rangarajan had the distinction of giving rare pallavi demonstrations at the Madras Music Academy using both hands for Thalam, comprising different Nadais.

== Titles & Awards ==
- 2001: Kalaimamani award by Tamil Nadu State.
- Gayaka Samrat conferred by Indian Fine Arts Society Annual Conference in 1957
- Sangita Simham conferred by Sangita Kalanidhi Chembai Vaidyanatha Bhagavathar.
- Ugadi Puraskar award by the Madras Telugu Academy.
- Award from Maharajapuram Viswanatha Iyer Trust in the year 1999.
- Sangita Kalashikhamani, 2010, Awarded by The Fine Arts Society, Chennai
- Ganakala Ratna
- Ganakala Sagara
