= T. S. Nandakumar =

Musician

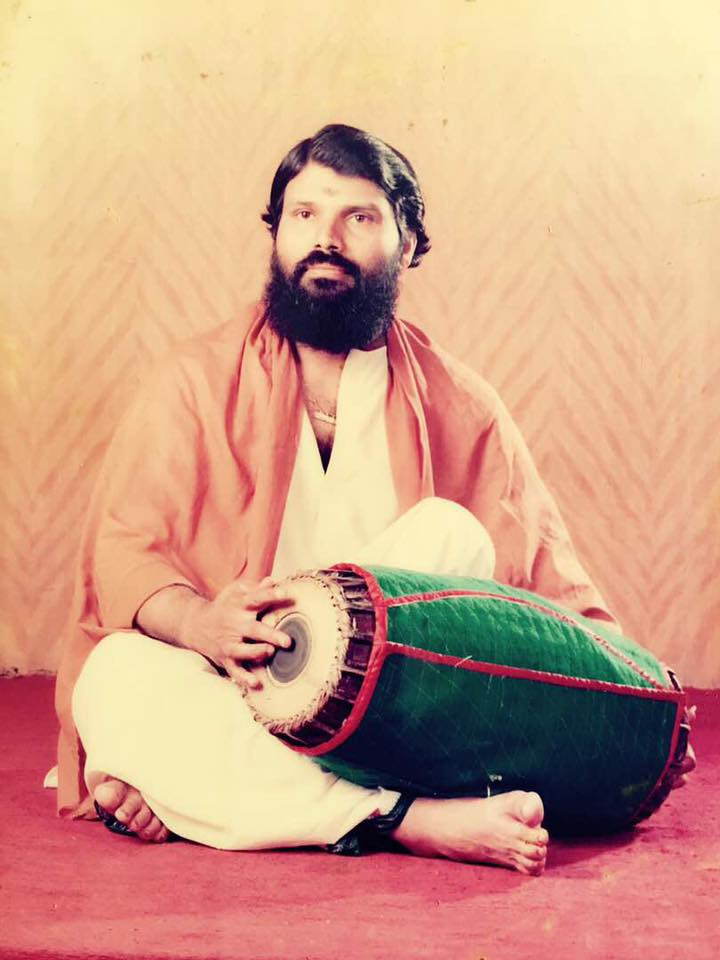

Background information
- Also known as: TSN, Bombay Nandakumar
- Born: 17 March 1958 (age 68); Ambalapuzha, Kerala, India
- Genre: Carnatic music
- Occupations: Percussionist, educator
- Instrument: Mridangam
- Years active: 1970s–present
- Website: tsnpac.com

T. S. Nandakumar (born 17 March 1958), also known as Bombay Nandakumar is an Indian percussionist, composer and educator. He is known for leading and directing percussion musical ensemble and has performed at various music festivals. Through his teaching activities in India and the United States, he has trained numerous students in carnatic music percussion and continues to perform and teach. He is a recipient of Sangeet Natak Akademi Award for his contribution to Carnatic instrumental music.

== Early life and training ==
Born in Ambalapuzha, Kerala, India, Nandakumar had his training in mridangam under Kaithavana Madhavadas in the gurukula system. He is associated with Ambalapuzha Brothers of Kerala.

== Career ==
Nandakumar started his career as a mridangist in Bombay, India and later focused on other traditional percussion instruments. He has performed with musicians including Semmangudi Srinivasa Iyer, M. D. Ramanathan, S. Ramanathan, R. K. Srikantan, Bhimsen Joshi, M. Balamuralikrishna, N. Rajam, T. N. Krishnan, N. Ramani, and K. J. Yesudas. He has been reported as a "Cultural Ambassador of India" by The Indian Panorama and as a "Master of Rhythm" by The Times of India. He has performed at several music festivals, including Chembai Sangeetholsavam and the Cleveland Thyagaraja Festival. He taught Carnatic percussion, training students in multiple percussion instruments and organizing talavadya ensemble performance in Carnatic style. He conducted lecture-demonstrations and such ensemble performances at different universities, music festivals and music venues namely The Percussive Arts Centre as a part of Taalavaadyotsava 94 which was a tribute to Chowdiah. He organized a Carnatic percussion ensemble of more than 80 students in instruments such as Mridangam, Ghatam, Kanjira, Thavil and Morsing along with konnakol recitation which was held at Shanmukhananda Hall, Mumbai, India in 2008 and a similar performance with 108 students at the Cleveland Thyagaraja Festival, US. In 1993, he composed and released an album Jewels of Rhythm featuring his students. He is mentioned for South Indian percussion in The Fragrant Garland: A biographical dictionary of Carnatic composers and musicians, and Music Criticism: Principles and Practice.

== Teaching ==
Nandakumar is the founder of TSN's Percussive Arts Centre (TSNPAC), an organization that teaches Carnatic music percussion and organizes concerts and musical ensemble performances. He has trained students in Carnatic percussion in India and the United States. He has taught percussion at several educational institutions including Shanmukhananda Fine Arts, Bombay, India. The 10th anniversary of TSNPAC was also held there. An endowment in his name is included in the annual music competition by the Shanmukhananda Fine Arts.

== Books ==
- Roots of Mridangam
- Intricacies of Mridangam
- The Ultimate Koruvais

== Works about T. S. Nandakumar ==
- The Rhythm Master: The Story of TSN, a children's book depicting the life and musical journey of T. S. Nandakumar.

== Discography ==
- Mridanga Laya Vinyasam
- Jewels of Rhythm Vol. 1
- Jewels of Rhythm Vol. 2
- Jewels of Rhythm Vol. 3
- Vibrative Rhythms
- Vibrative Rhythms 2
- Sruti Sandhya (with T. N. Krishnan)
- Sruti Sandhya 2 (with T. N. Krishnan)
- Vibrations (with A. Kanyakumari)
- South Indian Percussion
- Mridangam Solo
- Demonstration on Talas and Rhythms
- Konnakol
- Cascades of Rhythm
- Classical Treat (with Nedunuri Krishnamurthy)
- Jugalbandi Duet Series (with Bhimsen Joshi and M. Balamuralikrishna)
- A Duet on Strings (with T. N. Krishnan and N. Rajam)
- Classical Instrumental Moods (with Narayan Mani)
- Matunga Sisters (with Lakshmi and Kalyani Shankar)
- Swati Tirunal Kritis (with Radha Warrier)
- Divine Expressions (with Narayan Mani)
- Surabhi (with Mangalam Muthuswamy)

== Awards ==
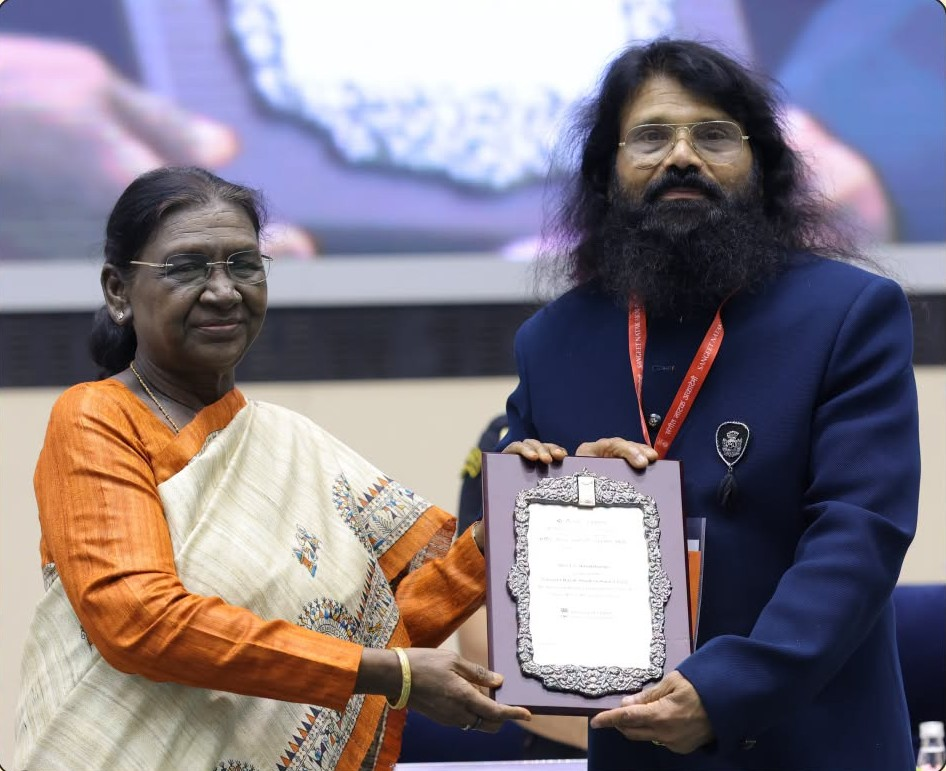
President of India, Smt. Droupadi Murmu presenting the Sangeet Natak Akademi Award to T. S. Nandakumar

- Sangeet Natak Akademi Award from Sangeet Natak Akademi, Government of India.
- Bharat Ratna Dr. M. S. Subbulakshmi Sangeetha Pracharya Award from Sri Shanmukhananda Fine Arts & Sangeetha Sabha, Mumbai.
- Excellence Award from NAMAM, New Jersey.
- Honorary degree from Brookdale Community College, New Jersey.
- Special Jury Citation of Excellence for Performing arts from the North American Malayalees & Associated Members.
- Award for Excellence in Performing Arts from the Indian American Kerala Cultural and Civic Center (Kerala Center), New York.
