= Chingleput Ranganathan =

Indian carnatic singer and guru

Chingleput Ranganathan (3 June 1938 - 12 July 2011) was a classical Carnatic vocalist and Guru.

== Early life ==
Chingleput Chelappa Ranganathan, was born in Chennai on 3 June 1938 to Sriman Chellappa Iyengar and Srimathi Rajalakshmi. His mother used to be a student of Harihara Iyer, a disciple of the Carnatic music great, Tiger Varadachariar. Ranganathan used to regularly accompany his mother to her music lessons. He then became a disciple of Flute Vidwan H.Ramachandra Shastri. It was Shastri who felt that he had the potential to train under the stalwart, Alathur Venkatesa Iyer. He thus entered the tutelage of Venkatesa Iyer of the Manambuchavadi lineage of Thyagaraja shishya parampara. He proceeded to undergo rigorous training with Alathur Brothers, Alathur Sivasubramania Iyer and Alathur Srinivasa Iyer under Gurukula System for ten years. His Arangetram was held in the Nerur Sadasiva Bramendral Utsavam in the year 1955. Vidwan Ramanathapuram M.N.Kandaswamy accompanied him on the Mridangam while his guru Alathur Venkatesa Iyer himself accompanied him on the harmonium on the occasion.

== Career ==
At the age of seventeen, Ranganathan secured the first place in the Music Competition held in October 1955, conducted by the All India Radio. He obtained the prize from the First President of India, Dr.Rajendra Prasad. He was an ‘A’ Top Grade Artist from the All India Radio and served for 20 years as a staff artist in the All India Radio (A.I.R., Chennai). As a staff artiste at the AIR, he conducted various programmes donning roles such as composer, conductor of orchestras, organiser etc. He served as the Asthana Vidwan of the Kanchi Kamakoti Mutt, Kanchipuram for more than twenty years. He was the Principal of the Teacher’s College of Music, The Music Academy, Chennai for over five years. Later he was a member of the faculty at its school of advanced learning in Carnatic music. He died on 12 July 2011.

== Achievements ==
He specialized in complex pallavis, including both well-known and less frequently performed compositions. He set Thiruppugazh verses to the 72 melakartha ragas and composed thillanas in all 35 suladi sapta talas. He was associated with the Arthur bani, a style noted for its emphasis on rhythmic structure as well as raga and compositional expression.

He was awarded the prestigious Sangita Nataka Akademi Award by our honourable President Dr.A.P.J.Abdul Kalam at the Akademi Puraskar Awards 2006, held in March 2007 and also honoured at the St. Thiagaraja Utsavam, with the title, "Sangeetha Kala Sagaram" at Cleveland, USA- April 2007.

== Personal life ==
Chingleput C.Ranganathan is married to Smt. Lakshmi Ranganathan on 26 August 1968. Chingleput C.Ranganathan died on 12 July 2011. He is survived by two sons Sri.R.Sai Krishnan & R.Sai Narasimhan both are specialists in playing flute Classical Music. His Second Son R.Sai Narasimhan is a Singer, Flautist, Music Composer, Mimicry Artist & TV Personality. On 12 July 2012, Sri.Sai Narasimhan inaugurated a trust in the name of Sri. Chingleput Ranganathan to spread and promote Carnatic music & other fine arts and to bring the works of his father.

== Awards and honorary titles ==
- "SANGEETHA ACHARYA" in the year 1991 by Guruji H.H.Swamy Haridoss Giri Swamigal.
- "NADAKKANAL" in the year 1992 at the Bharathiyar Festival held in Chennai.
- "GAYAKA KALANIDHI" in the year 1999 by Srirangam Srimad Andavan Sri Ranga Ramanuja Maha Desigan.
- "THIRUPPUGAZH MAMANI" in August 1999 by Vadapalani Thiruppugazh Sabha, Chennai.
- "SANGEETHA KALA ACHARYA" in January 2000 by The Music Academy, Chennai.
- "KALA RATNA" by Rasika Ranjani Sabha, Chennai, December 2002.
- "SANGEETH SAMRAT" in Nov 2003 by Sri Viswesha Theertha Swamiji of Sri Pejawar Mutt, Udupi for Bharatiya Vidya Bhavan & Sangeetha Parishath, Mangalore.
- "CARNATIC MUSIC PALLAVI WIZARD" in April 2005 by Rajah Annamalaipuram Bhakta Jana Sabha.
- "SWARA RAGA SARAGNAR" in 2005 at the Panchamukha Anjaneyar Utsavam, Mylapore.
- "LAYA KALA NIPUNA" by Percussive Arts Centre, Palghat Mani Iyer Memorial Trust, Bangalore on 29 May 2006.
- "SANGEETHA KALA SAGARAM" by Bhargavi Fine Arts, Cleveland in April 2007 at the St. Thiagaraja Utsavam, Cleveland, USA.
- "SANGITA NATAKA AKADEMI AWARD"-MARCH 2007 AT SANGITA NATAKA AKADEMI DELHI. Received from the hands of our honourable president Dr.A.P.J. Abdul Kalam.

== Awards and honours ==
Shri Ranganathan was honoured by a large number of sabhas and trusts like Maharajapuram Viswanatha Iyer Trust, Gnanaskandan Trust, Kapali Fine Arts, Kannapiran Samajam, Shanti Arts Foundation, Guru Krupa Trust, Laya Lavanya Trust, Rukmini Arts Academy, Narada Gana Sabha, Percussive Arts Centre, Palghat Mani Iyer Memorial Trust, Shri P.S.Narayanaswamy Disciples Forum and several others.
