= R. R. Keshavamurthy =

- Born: R. R. Keshavamurthy; 1913
- Died: 2006 (aged 92–93)

RR Keshavamurthy (1913–2006) was an Indian violinist. RRK, as he was popularly known, specialised in the seven-stringed violin. RRK was a student of Bidaram Krishnappa, the guru of the violinist Mysore T. Chowdiah. He was said to be a legend of the seven-stringed violin. He influenced senior musicians like T. Rukmini, Bhuvaneshawaraih, M. S. Krishnaveni and Anoor Ramakrishna.

RRK trained a number of young musicians and is the author of a dozen books on music. He was known for his rigorous practice and discipline. Today's other performing students trained by RRK include Dr. Meenakshi Ravi, Dr. Jyotsna Srikanth, Yogendra R, Vidwan. Mysore Sanjeev kumar - Violist and Violinist Nalina Mohan, Jyotsna Manjunath and Nikhil Joshi. RRK presented many papers on the subject of violin playing and violin fingering techniques.

R. R. Keshavamurthy was addressed with the title Sangeeta Vidya Sagara more frequently than others. He received many other titles such as Sangeetha Kala Rathna and Nada Bheeshma Vidwan. He was not celebrated much during his lifetime for his unique temperament and was not known to be very sociable. He was known for his terse and tough expressions.

He authored many music books.

== Awards ==
- Veena Seshanna Memorial Award
- Kanaka Purandara Prashasthi in 1993
- Sangeet Natak Akademi Award
