= Charumathi Raghuraman =

- Born: Mumbai, India
- Origin: India
- Genres: Indian classical music Carnatic music
- Occupation: Classical Violinist
- Instrument: Violin
- Website: www.charuraghu.com

Charumathi Raghuraman is an Indian carnatic music violinist.

== Early life and tutelage ==
Charumathi Raghuraman was born to Rama (a Carnatic vocalist) and V. Raghuraman. Born into a family of musicians, she started to learn the violin from her mother. She then received formal training from T. R. Balamani in Mumbai. In 1995, upon T. N. Krishnan's advice, Charumathi became his disciple when she was just 7 years old. She studied Carnatic vocal music from P. S. Narayanaswamy. She holds a master's degree in Business Administration from Xavier Institute.

Her husband Anantha R. Krishnan, a grandson of late Palghat Raghu, is a mridangam player.

== Performance career ==
Her first concert was with T. N. Krishnan in 1998, and since then, she has performed as soloist and accompanist. She has performed in many music festivals and institutions, across India and abroad. Charumathi participated in The Woodford Folk Festival, Australia, in 2011 and in Sacramento Philharmonic Orchestra, USA.

== Style ==
Her musicianship includes the rare combination of a pure sound and erudite content. Charumathi is also a violin and vocal teacher.

== Awards ==
- 'Outstanding Young Violinist' Award and 'Best Sub Senior Violinist' Award in 2007 & 2009 ‘Best Violinist’ awards for the years 2001, 2002, 2004 and 2006 from Madras Music Academy
- The Kalki Krishnamurthy Memorial Award in 2016
- ’Ramabhadran Centenary Award’ for the Most Promising Young Musician of the Year 2013 from Tag Corporation, India
- ’Young Achiever award’ from Rotary Club, Madras
- CCR&T, Govt. of India scholarship from the age of ten
