= Sukumar Prasad =

South Indian guitarist

Sukumar Prasad is a South Indian guitarist who was the first Carnatic musician to play the south Indian musical art form of Carnatic music on the electric guitar. He not only played Carnatic music on guitar but was a skilled mridangam artist who accompanied stalwarts including Alathur Srinivasa Iyer, M. Balamuralikrishna and T. R. Subramanyam.

== Early years ==
Prasad began learning Carnatic music from a very young age from his uncle M. Chandrasekaran and mridangam with Trichy Sri. Raghavan Iyer. In 1970 he gave his mridangam arangetram. In the early 1970s he began playing Carnatic music on the guitar and in 1981 he was honored by the Music Academy, Madras for having adapted the western instrument guitar to Carnatic. A cassette exists of him from 1985 playing several Carnatic standards, including one of the compositions for which he became renowned, "Brova Barama." It is currently out of print. He is the son of Chennai's famous cost accountant Mr Renganathan and Padma Renganathan. It is learnt that he had associated himself with the Adi Parasakthi Peetam in Melmaruvattur, Chennai.He was with Price Water House, Chennai.

== Disappearance ==
The details of Prasad's disappearance from the Carnatic music scene are hazy at best, and many famed artists and scholars are unfamiliar with his contribution to Carnatic music. He toured the U.S. in 1988 and in Australia in 1989, but sometime shortly after he disappeared from the music scene. Poovalur Sriji, mridangam artist and professor at the University of North Texas postulated that, "One reason I think is he was too trendy for the 1970's conservative audience. Institutions like the Academy won't (sic) give him stage as he was not [as] 'traditional' as Emani Sankara Sastry and Chitti Babu were since they used contact microphones....I have accompanied him in many concerts, most of them wedding events."

== Education ==
Sukumar Prasad received a degree from the AC College of Technology, Madras.
