= B. Rajam Iyer =

Indian carnatic singer (1922 – 2009)

- Born: Balasubramaniam Rajam Iyer; 15 July 1922; Karaikudi, Ramnad district, Tamilnadu
- Died: 3 May 2009 (aged 86)
- Citizenship: India
- Occupation: vocalist

Balasubramaniam Rajam Iyer (15 July 1922 – 3 May 2009) was a carnatic singer from South India. He was awarded the Madras Music Academy's Sangeetha Kalanidhi in 1987.

== Family ==
Rajam Iyer was born in Karaikudi, in Ramnad district, (Note: Now Karaikudi is in Sivaganga district) to Balasubramania Iyer and Lakshmi Ammal.

== Training in music ==
He began his training in Carnatic music under Thirukokarnam Subbiah Bhagaathar and then under Ganapathy Iyer of Kunnakudi. The latter is a Gottuvadyam and Jalatarangam player. This initial training lasted for about five years.
He went for advanced training as the disciple of Ariyakudi Ramanuja Iyengar. This training was undertaken in the traditional Gurukula (residing in the master's residence and serving him) style and lasted for about 10 years.
Rajam Iyer grew up as the leading disciple of Ramanuja Iyengar and became an exponent of his style of singing.
His long association with Ramanuja Iyengar helped him to enrich his repertoire. In addition, he learnt Muthuswami Dikshitar krithis from T. L. Venkatarama Iyer, a recipient of the Prestigious Sangeetha Kalanidhi award.

== As a musicologist ==
He published these and many other songs to which he set music.
He was a tutor to the Travancore royal family members for 4 years since 1943. He served as a member of the selection panels of Madras and Delhi universities. He was a member of the expert committee of the Madras Music Academy
Perhaps his greatest achievement was bringing out the Tamil edition of Sangita Sampradaya Pradarshini written by Subbarama Dikshitar. This was done for the Madras Music Academy.

== Concerts ==
His first concert was during the Thyagaraja Aradhana at Thiruvaiyaru in 1942. He gave his first performance in Chennai (it was called Madras, then) in 1956 with a concert in the Jagannadha Sabha in Egmore. He renders the compositions with sincerity and devotion. His concerts are noted for the sustained interest they acquire from the tana varna to the lighter pieces bringing out the excellence in composition and musical content.
He had also served as the "Top Grade Artiste" of All India Radio.

== Publishing of notations of Sri Muthuswami Dikshitar in Swadesamitran ==
Sangita Kalanidhi Sri B. Rajam Iyer was a living authority in rendering Shri Muthuswami Dikshitar's kritis. He had the benefit of learning these kritis under the tutelage of Shri T.L.Venkatarama Iyer, who himself had the privilege of learning them from Shri Ambi Dikshitar. Shri Rajam Iyer wrote swara notations to several Dikshitar's compositions and these were published in Swadesamitran, Tamil weekly in 1956. He was fired by a grand ambition — to share and propagate the glories of the Dikshitar heritage. The swara knowledge fostered by his first Guru Sri Kunnakudi Ganapathi Iyer, a Gottuvadyam and a Jalatharangam artiste was a blessing as Dikshitar's compositions demanded meticulous expertise in the notation process, as evident in Rajam Iyer's “Selected Compositions of Sri Muttusvami Dikshitar” (2004) published in Roman and Devanagari scripts, or in his contributions as co-editor of Subbarama Dikshitar's “Sampradaya Pradarsini.”The original Pataantaram (repertoire) of the great composers’ kritis were reflected in the notations.

He once visited Arsha Vidya Gurukulam, Saylorsburg, Pennysylvana, in August 2003, to conduct a weeklong camp on Dikshitar Kritis in the presence of Pujya Swamiji Dayananda Saraswathi. One of his students Subbalakshmi Chandrasekaran was fortunate to learn a few kritis taught by Shri B. Rajam Iyer and was inspired by the method by which very difficult kritis were taught with ease. She undertook the project of translating the original notations of the kritis in English, for the benefit of the music students all over the world who may not be able to read Tamil. The notations were in English and the sahitya were written following the international scheme of Transliteration. The kritis were written in Devanagiri as well as in Romanised English fonts. The book was published in the year October 2004.

== Awards and honours ==
- Kalaimamani, 1981 by Tamil Nadu State Government
- Swar Vilas, 1981 by Sur singer Samsad, Mumbai
- Certificate of Merit and T.T.K. Memorial Award, 1984, the Music Academy
- Government of India Senior Fellowship, 1984-86
- The T.T.K Trust Award for Meritorious Musicians, 1985, The Music Academy, Chennai, FiftyEighth Conference
- Dr. Raja Sir Annamalai Chettiar Memorial Award for Talented Musicians, 1986, The Music Academy, Chennai, Fiftyninth Conference
- Sangeetha Kalasikhamani, 1985 by The Indian Fine Arts Society
- Sangeet Natak Akademi Award in 1986 by Sangeet Natak Akademi
- Sangeetha Kalanidhi, 1987 by Music Academy, Chennai
- Guruguhanjali Award, 1997, Guruguhanjali Trust of Dr.V.V. Srivatsa
- Kala Ratna, 2000, Rasikaranjani Sabha, Chennai
- Sangeetha Kala Sironmani, 2000, Nungambakkam Cultural Academy, Chennai
- Sangeetha Acharya, 2001, Narada Gana Sabha
- Gayakaratnam, 2002, Sri Swati Tirunal Sangita Sabha, Trivandrum
- Padma Bhushan, 2003 by the Government of India
- Kalai Chudar, 2003, Palani Tamil Sangam Sabha
- Sangeetha Kala Sagara, 2004, Thyagaraja Festival of Cleveland, USA
- Honorary Doctorate, 2004, University of Madras
- Nadha yogi, 2004, Sri Parthasarathy Swamy Sabha, Chennai
- Contributions to Sangita Sampradaya Pradarshini, 2005, Music Academy, Chennai at the 78th Annual Conference on 4 January 2005
- Gayaka Sikhamani, 2006, Sanskrit College Chennai
- Veteran Award, 2006, Bharat Kalachar
- Sangeetha Seva Nirata, 2006, Sri Thyagaraja Sangeetha Vidwath Samajam
- Arsha Kala Bhushanam, 2008, Dayananda Swamiji

== Personal life ==
He had 5 daughters. His fifth daughter Gowri Venkataraman learnt music from him and accompanied him for concerts. His second son-in-law Sri V.Subramanian and grand daughter Dr.S.Seethalakshmi learnt music from him and accompanied him for concerts in India and abroad.

== Prominent students ==
Smt. Vaijayanthi Mala Bali, Hon’ble Chief Minister Dr.J. Jayalalitha, Mallika Sivasailam (TAFE group), N Veera Raghavan, Padmavathy (IAS), Dr. Prameela Gurumurthy, Jayanthi Ravi (IAS), Chandrika Rajaraman, Namagiri Ramesh, Rajini Hariharan, Kalki group Smt. Anandhi, Prakash, Dr. Gowri Ramanarayan, his (Rajam Iyer's) fifth daughter Gowri Venkataraman, TVS group Sheela Balaji, Mallika Srinivasan, Gayathri Mahesh, Jayalakshmi Santhanam, Padma Sandilyan, Rama Ravi, Sirigudi Sisters, Prof. Unnikrishnan, V.K.Manimaran, Rajini Hariharan, Namagiri Ramesh, Kasthuri Shiv kumar Bhat and Dr.Shiv kumar Bhat

=== Foreign Students ===
Prof. David Reck, Prof. Skelton, Sri Swaminathan Natarajan, Smt. Sivasakthi Sivanesan (London) and Sri Y.Yadavan (London).

== Death ==
B. Rajam Iyer died on Sunday 3 May 2009 (aged 86) after a brief illness.
