= M. Chandrasekaran =

Carnatic, classical violist

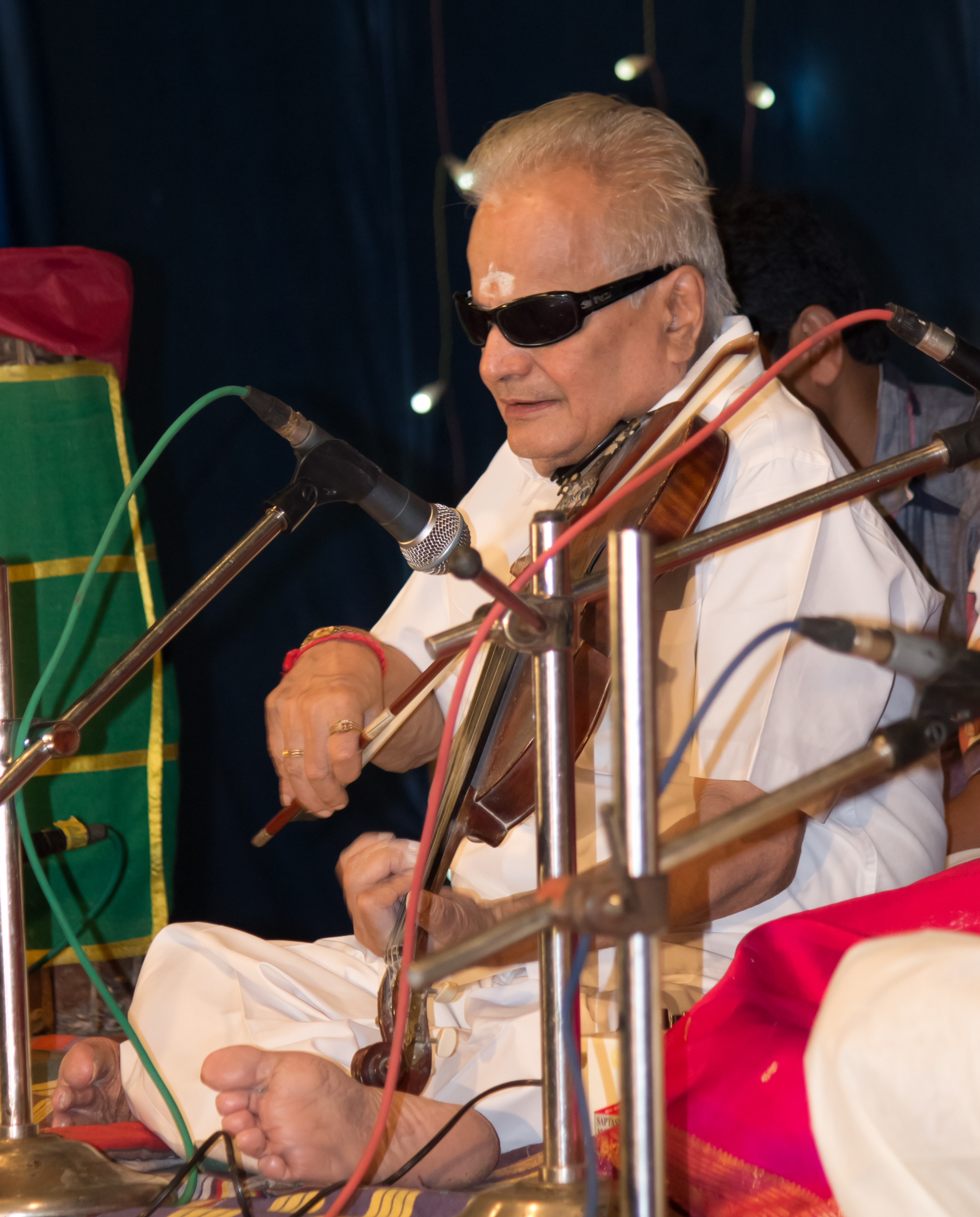
Performing at Changampuzha park, Kochi, Kerala.

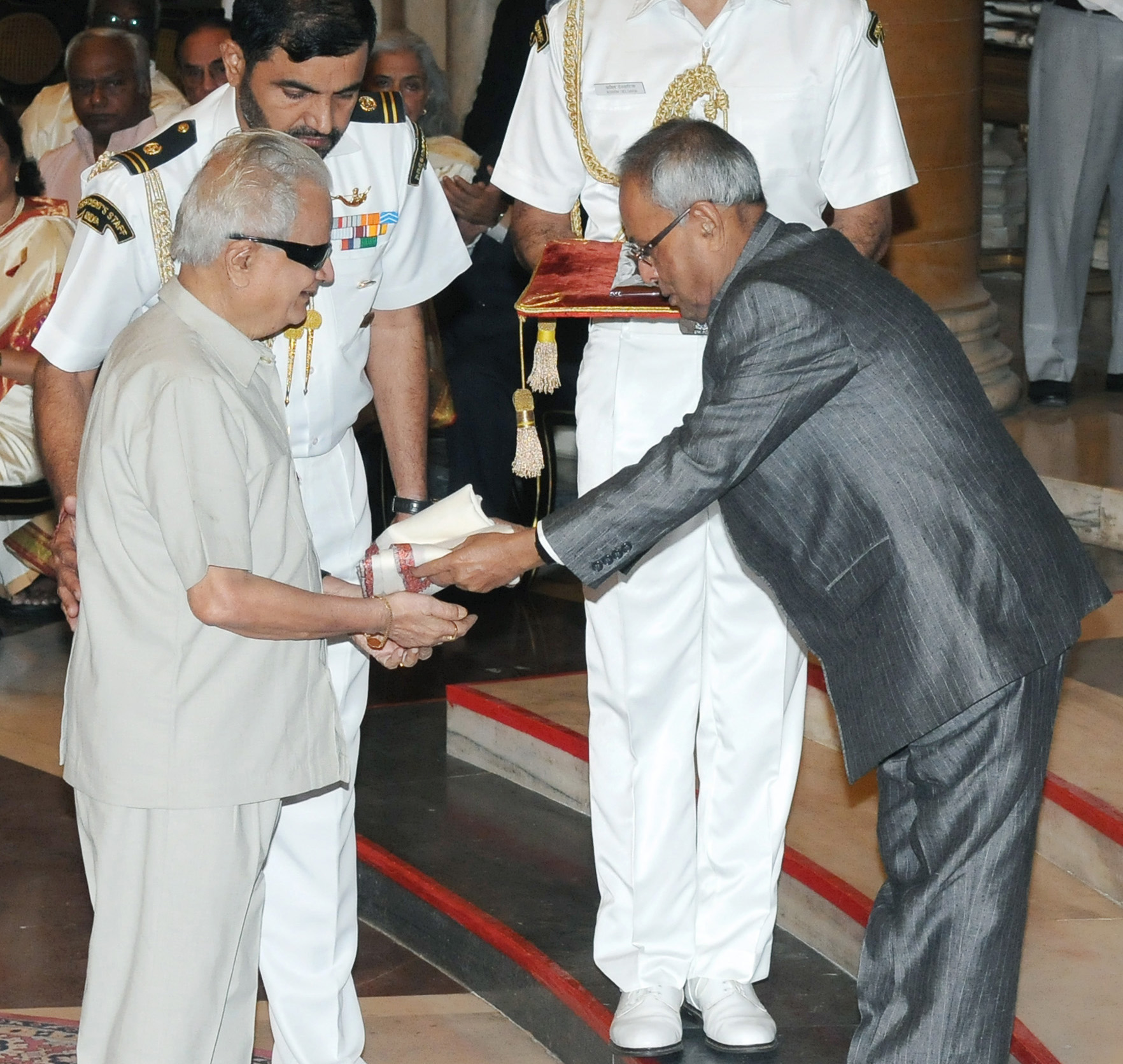
Pranab Mukherjee presenting the Sangeet Natak Akademi Fellowship to Shri Mohan Chandrasekaran, at the investiture ceremony of the Sangeet Natak Akademi Fellowships and Sangeet Natak Akademi Awards-2011, at Rashtrapati Bhavan

Mohanan Chandrasekaran is a Carnatic classical violinist from Chennai, Tamil Nadu, India. He was awarded the Madras Music Academy's Sangeetha Kalanidhi in 2005.

== Early life ==
He was born in Calcutta, on 11 December 1937 as the younger of the two sons of T.N. Mohanan and Charubala Mohanan, a violinist herself. Chandrasekharan began playing the violin at the age of 11, after which he went on to accompany many musicians in the field of Carnatic music. Having lost his eyesight at the age of two, he overcame his difficulty by music. He is also considered an expert in the laya (tempo) aspects, recognizing and adapting to intricate rhythmic patterns.

== Work ==
Sri Chandrasekharan also presents vocal concerts, and sometimes sings along during his solo violin recitals. He has composed various musical forms in different languages, and has travelled the world performing. He often performs violin duet concerts with his daughter Smt. G. Bharathi. He has accompanied several masters of Carnatic music including Maharajapuram Santhanam, G. N. Balasubramaniam, Madurai Mani Iyer, Dr. K J Yesudas, Maharajapuram Viswanatha Iyer, flute N. Ramani, K. V. Narayanaswamy, T. N. Seshagopalan, D. K. Jayaraman, and T. K. GovindaRao.
