= K. V. Narayanaswamy =

K.V. Narayanaswamy
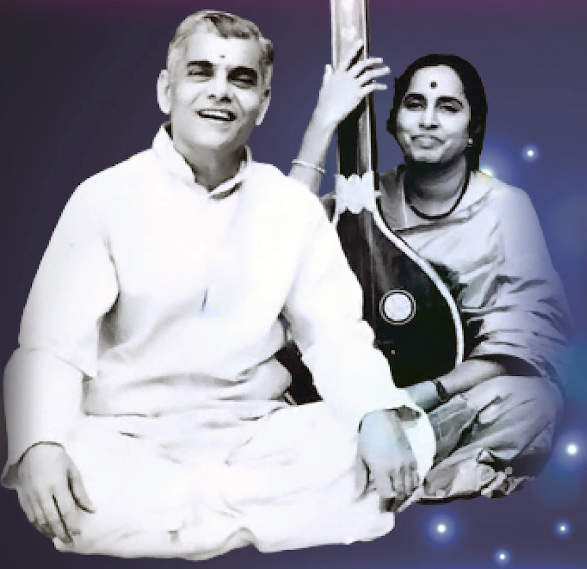
- K. V. Narayanaswamy with wife Padma Narayanaswamy

Background information
- Also known as: KVN
- Born: 15 November 1923; Palghat, Madras Presidency, British India (Now Kerala)
- Died: 1 April 2002 (aged 78) Chennai, Tamil Nadu, India
- Genres: Carnatic classical music
- Website: www.narada.org

Palghat Kollengode Viswanathan Narayanaswamy (15 November 1923 – 1 April 2002), often referred to as K. V. Narayanaswamy was an Indian musician, widely considered to be among the finest Carnatic music vocalists of the 20th century. He was awarded the Madras Music Academy's Sangeetha Kalanidhi in 1986. He was described as the "Perfect Knight" of Carnatic music, a phrase from Geoffrey Chaucer, by V. K. Narayana Menon, art critic of India and recipient of the Sangeet Natak Akademi Fellowship.

== Early life and background ==
Narayanaswamy was born to Kollengode Viswanathayyar and Muthulakshmi Ammal in Palghat, Kerala, to a Palakkad Iyer family, a district renowned for its cultural and musical traditions, on 15 November 1923. Narayanaswamy was born into a family of illustrious musicians and artists. His great-grandfather Viswam Bhagavatar was renowned for his evocative Ashtapadis and rendered services for Maharaja Ayilyam Thirunal, ruler of the princely state of Travancore from 1860 to 1880. In return Viswam Bhagavatar was bestowed with government aid and hereditary royal privileges. Viswam Bhagavatar's son, Narayana Bhagavatar continued his father's legacy. His son was violin maestro, Viswanathayyar (soon came to be known as 'Fiddle' Viswanathayyar), His father. K.V. Narayanaswamy learned basic music lessons under his father and grandfather. After studying in Palghat till the fifth form, he moved to Coimbatore, where he briefly dabbled in theatre. Narayanaswamy even managed a role as the young Kanappan in the movie Kannappa Nayanar. The movie bombed at the box office.

Narayanaswamy began extensive training under Mridangam maestro, Padma Bhushan, Palghat Mani Iyer. Mani Iyer proceeded to place Narayanaswamy under the tutelage of Sangeetakalacharya C.S. Krishna Iyer, a highly competent vocalist, musicologist and composer in Palghat, and then under violinist and Sangeetha Kalanidhi Papa Venkataramaiah. Viswanatha Bhagavatar was however very keen that Narayanaswamy should train under Sangeetha Kalanidhi Chembai Vaidyanatha Bhagavatar or Sangeetha Kalanidhi Padma Bhushan Ariyakudi Ramanuja Iyengar, who were two of the four most dominant musicians of the first half of the twentieth century along with the likes of Semmangudi Srinivasa Iyer and G. N. Balasubramaniam. Mani Iyer soon judged Narayanaswamy to be ready for gurukulavasam under Ariyakudi and in 1942, Narayanaswamy took the giant step. He entered the home of Ariyakudi Ramanuja Iyengar and remained an ardent disciple until the latter's death in 1967.

== Performing career ==
Narayanaswamy's major break came at a Madras Music Academy concert in 1951, when he was unexpectedly forced to substitute for his guru, Ariyakudi Ramanuja Iyengar who was not in a position to attend the conference under unforeseen circumstances. Accompanied by doyens Palghat Mani Iyer and Papa Venkataramayya, this concert proved to be a milestone in Narayanaswamy's career. The training under Palghat Mani Iyer allowed Narayanaswamy to develop a solid knowledge of rhythmic nuances. This in turn would enable him to be at ease in the company of such legends of percussion as Palani Subramaniam Pillai, Palghat R. Raghu, Mavelikkara Velukkutty Nair, and Umayalpuram K. Sivaraman to name a few. Narayanaswamy, Palghat R. Raghu, and violin maestro T.N.Krishnan soon became a frequent and much admired combination on stage.

K.V.Narayanaswamy was intimately connected to the Travancore royal family following his skilful rendition of Swathi Thirunal Rama Varma's Navaratri compositions. Another landmark in Narayanaswamy's life came in 1964 when he participated in the East-West Encounter concerts in New Delhi. This was followed by a widely acclaimed concert at the Edinburgh Festival in Scotland in 1965. On being made professor of music at Wesleyan University, Middletown, Connecticut, between 1965 and 1967, he went on a coast-to-coast concert tour of US. He was one of four artists including Bismillah Khan, Ali Akbar Khan, and Ravi Shankar who participated in the hugely popular Hollywood Bowl music festival in Los Angeles in the summer of 1967. In 1974, Narayanaswamy went to teach in Berkeley, California for a year, in the company of dancer Balasaraswati and sitarist Nikhil Banerjee. Invited by the American Society of Eastern Arts, he travelled to North America, Europe (Berlin Music Festival in 1976) and Australia (Adelaide Arts Festival in 1988) multiple times thereafter on various concert tours. He also joined the Music College in Madras as a lecturer in 1962 when Musiri Subramania Iyer was its principal, and retired as Professor of Music in 1982. In 1984, Narayanaswamy was to become the first Indian musician to be awarded the Fulbright Scholarship and went to San Diego State University in California as an artist-in-residence under the scholarship. For nine months he taught at the university and gave performances all over North America.

== Musical style and song repertoire ==
Though Narayanaswamy's singing bore his master Ariyakudi's Bani, over the years he evolved a unique style of his own. Strict classicism and blemish-less singing are some of the obvious facets of his music. His vast repertoire included songs that encompassed every genre, a number of languages and composers belonging to different ages. Endaro Mahanubhavulu in Sri Ragam, Sri Subrahmanya Namaste in Kambhoji, Bala gopala in Bhairavi, Satatam Tavaka in Kharaharapriya, Pahi Janani in Natakuranji, Enneramum in rāga Devagandhari, Pirava varam tarum in Latangi and Kanavendamo in Sriranjani are some of the songs that have come to bear his distinct signature. "The depth of emotion and the pathos he invested in singing certain compositions of Gopalakrishna Bharathi, especially VarugalAmo ayya and his incomparable and unique presentation of Krishna nee beganey in the style of Jayammal and Balasaraswati, in which he caressed the words and phrases exquisitely and had the audience in a trance as if he were a pied piper" are noteworthy. Strict adherence to Shruthi (musical pitch), lyrical purity and a poignant rendition were distinctive features of Narayanaswamy's music.

== Leading disciples ==
Some of Narayanaswamy's leading disciples were Padma Narayanaswamy (whom he married), vocalist K.V.Ananthan, violinist and vocalist Hemmige V. Srivatsan, renowned flautist Shashank Subramanyam, Padma Sandilyan, Padmasri Veeraraghavan, Hemmige S. Prashanth, T. S. Pattabhirama Pandit, Sathish Rao, M.R.Subramaniam, T. S. Ranganathan, Manipallavam K.Sarangan, Balaji Prasad Krishnamurthy, Ravi Srinivasan, Navneet Krishnan, B. Raman and Ramanujan. Also French Algerian Toufiq Touzene AKA Tulsi Ram.

== Personal life ==
In 1948 Narayanaswamy married Palghat Mani Iyer's cousin Annapoorni. They had three daughters and a son: Muktha, Lalitha, Viswanathan and violinist Ramaa Raghunathan. She died in 1962. In 1965 Narayanaswamy married Padma, a talented musician and disciple who continues to train her husband's students in his style. Their daughter Anuradha Krishnamurthy is a trained vocalist and television actor.

== Recognition ==
- Kerala Sangeetha Nataka Akademi Award, 1971
- President of India's Padma Shri, 1976
- Central Sangeet Natak Academi Award, 1976
- Fulbright Scholar and visiting professor at University of California, San Diego, 1984–85
- Madras Music Academy's Sangita Kalanidhi Award, 1986.
- The Fine Arts Society's Sangeetha Kalasikhamani award (1989)

== See also ==
- Carnatic music
