= A. K. C. Natarajan =

Indian carnatic music clarinet player (born 1931)

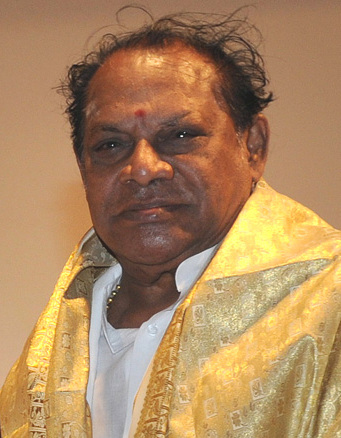

Background information
- Born: 30 March 1931 (age 94); Trichinopoly, Madras Presidency, British India (now Tiruchirappalli, Tamil Nadu, India)
- Genres: Carnatic music
- Instruments: clarinet

A. K. C. Natarajan (born 30 March 1931) is a carnatic music clarinet player. He was awarded the Madras Music Academy's Sangeetha Kalanidhi in 2008. He received a Sangeet Natak Akademi Award in 1994. He was bestowed with the title Nadha Dweepa Kalanidhi by Nadhadweepam Trust, Tiruchirappalli. He learnt vocal music from Alathur Venkatesa Iyer and his nagaswaram teacher was Iluppur Natesa Pillai, brother of the thavil maestro Iluppur Panchami. In 2022, Natarajan was awarded a Padma Shri, the fourth-highest honour that can be bestowed upon a civilian in India, for contribution in the arts.
