= Maharajapuram S. Ramachandran =

Indian Carnatic vocalist (born 1949)

- Born: S. Ramachandran; 30 June 1949 (age 76); Chennai, Tamil Nadu, India
- Citizenship: India
- Occupation: Carnatic vocalist
- Parents: Maharajapuram Santhanam (father); Gnanam (mother)
- Relatives: Maharajapuram Viswanatha Iyer (grandfather)
- Awards: Sangeet Natak Akademi Award (2022); Kalaimamani (2012)
- Musical career
- Genres: Carnatic music
- Instrument: Vocal

Maharajapuram Santhanam Ramachandran (born 30 June 1949) is an Indian Carnatic vocalist from Chennai, Tamil Nadu. He received many awards and honors including the Kalaimamani by the Government of Tamil Nadu and Sangeet Natak Akademi Award by Sangeet Natak Akademi, Government of India.

== Biography ==
S. Ramachandran was born on 30 June 1949, at Chennai in Tamil Nadu. He was born into a family of Carnatic musicians. His father Maharajapuram Santhanam and his grandfather Maharajapuram Viswanatha Iyer were also renowned Carnatic vocalists. His mother Gnanam is also a Carnatic musician. He received his training in Carnatic vocal music from his father and also from his grandfather. Ramachandran also trained in Mridangam. He also accompanied his father during his concerts.

== Career ==
Ramachandran follows the same style of music that his father and grandfather, his gurus, followed. He gave his first solo concert at Krishna Gana Sabha in 1978. He has performed in various venues across India including the Madras Music Academy in Chennai.

Ramachandran who is also a teacher in Carnatic music, has also worked as a faculty in fine arts at Annamalai University. He has also conducted many workshops on music in India and abroad. He is also an A grade artist of All India Radio and Doordarshan.

== Awards and honors ==
Ramachandran received many awards and honors including Kalaimamani by the Government of Tamil Nadu in 2012, and the Sangeet Natak Akademi Award for the year 2022 for his contribution to Carnatic vocal music. He also received titles like Sangeetha Choodamani given by Sri Krishna Gana Sabha, Arsha Kala Bhushan, Tamil Isai Vendhar by the Government of Tamil Nadu, the Asthana Vidwan from Sri Jagadguru Badari Shankaracharya Samasthan, and the Isai Kalai Selvan from Australian Tamil Foundation. In January 2025, he received the Sree Sathsanga Papanasam Sivan Awards by Sree Sath Sangam Papanasam Sivan Karnataka Sangeetha Sabha, Madipakkam.
