= Sangeetha Kalasikhamani =

Award given to Carnatic musicians

Sangeetha Kalasikhamani or Sangita Kalasikhamani (Sanskrit: saṅgītakalāśikhāmaṇi; from sangeetha = music, kala = art, sikhamaṇi = gem of a diadem or crest) is the title awarded yearly to an expert Carnatic musician by the Indian Fine Arts Society, Chennai.

== List of Sangeetha Kalasikhamanis ==
Year	Inaugurated by	Recipient
1933	S. Rm. M. Annamalai Chettiar	Doreswamy Iyengar
1934	V. V. Srinivasa Iyengar	V. V. Srinivasa Iyengar
1935	K. V. Reddy Naidu	Keerthanacharya C. R. Sreenivasa Iyengar
1936	Lady M. Venkata Subbarao	Prof. P. Sambamurthi
1937	B.Gopala Reddy	S. Satyamurti
1938	The Yuvaraja of Mysore	Ariyakudi Ramanuja Iyengar
1939	Rukmini Devi Arundale	M. S. Ramaswamy Iyer
1940	Maharaja of Travancore	Kallidaikurichi Vedanta Bhagavathar
1941	The Maharaja of Pithapuram	Dwaram Venkataswamy Naidu
1942	M. Venkatasubba Rao	Mazhavarayanendal Subbarama Bhavathar
1943	Dr. S. Radhakrishnan	Palladam Sanjiva Rao
1944	S. Rm. M. Chidambaram Chettiar	M. S. Ramaswamy Iyer
1945	P. V. Rajamannar	Ananthanarayana Iyer
1946	Dr. A. Lakshmanaswamy Mudaliar	Dr. T. Srinivasaraghavan
1947	Dr. P. Subbaroyan	T. Lakshmana Pillai
1948	Justice A. S. P. Iyer	Prof. R. Srinivasan
1949	C. P. Ramaswami Iyer	K. Vasudeva Sastry
1950	Rukmini Devi Arundale	Papanasam Sivan
1951	T. L. Venkatarama Iyer	Ariyakudi Ramanuja Iyengar
1952	U. Krishna Rao	Tirupampuram N. Swaminatha Pillai
1953	Sri Prakasa	Kalki Krishnamurthy
1954	C. Rajagopalachari	C. Saraswathi Bai
1955	Mrinalini Sarabhai	M. M. Dandapani Desikar
1956	Maharaja of Travancore	Prof. Sambamurthi, B.A., B.L.,
1957	Justice P. Rajagopalan	E. Krishna Iyer
1958	P. V. Cherian	T. Chowdiah
1959	C. P. Ramaswami Iyer	K.S. Ramaswamy Sastrigal
1960	Bishnuram Medhi	V.C. Gopalarathnam
1961	Vyjayanthimala	Sermadevi L. Subramania Sastrigal
1962	Justice R Sadasivam	R. Rangaramanuja Iyyangar
1963	M. Bhaktavatsalam	S. Y. Krishnaswamy, I.C.S. (Retd)
1964	P. Chandra Reddy	Chembai Vaidyanatha Bhagavatar
1965	Nallasenapathy Sarkarai Mandradiar	Chittoor Subramaniam Pillai
1966	Damodaram Sanjeevaiah	Musiri Subramania Iyer
1967	Ujjal Singh	Thyagaraja Bicentenary – No President
1968	Justice K. Veeraswamy	Budalur Krishnamurthi Sastri
1969	S. Madhavan	Papanasam Sivan
1970	Dharam Veera	Sripada Pinakapani
1971	M. Karunanidhi	Mudicondan C. Venkatarama Iyer
1972	K. K. Shah	Thiruveezhimizhalai S. Subramanya Pillai
1973	V. R. Nedunchezhiyan	T. Brinda
1974	The Hon’ble Mr. Justice P.R Gokulkrishnan	Semmangudi Srinivasa Iyer
1975	Malcolm Adiseshiah	M. S. Subbulakshmi
1976	C. V. Narasimhan	M. D. Ramanathan
1977	P. Ramachandran	Embar S. Vijayaraghavachariar
1978	Tayi Ramaprasada Rao	D. K. Pattammal
1979	Prabhudas Patwari	Vazhuvoor Ramaiah Pillai
1980	M. M. Ismail	S. V. Sahasranamam
1981	Sadiq Ali	Balasaraswati
1982	S. L. Khurana	S. Balachander
1983	K. Rajaram	S. Somasundaram
1984	Dr.V. K. Narayanan Menon	Umayalpuram K. Sivaraman
1985	N. Mahalingam	B. Rajam Iyer
1986	Dr.G. Subrahmanyam	Guru Gopinath
1987	R. Soundararajan	M. L. Vasanthakumari
1988	G. V. Ramakrishna	T. S. Balakrishna Sastrigal
1989	S. Obul Reddy	K. V. Narayanaswamy
1990	Lalgudi Jayaraman	S. K. Rajarathnam
1991	S. Viswanathan	Semmangudi Srinivasa Iyer & M. Balamuralikrishna
1992	T. C. A. Ramanujam	Chidambaram Dr.V. V. Swarnavenkatesa Deekshitar
1993	R. Ramakrishnan	T. N. Krishnan
1994	Ramaswamy Venkataraman	Mysore V. Doraiswamy Iyengar
1995	Nalli Kuppuswami Chetti	R. Vedavalli
1996	G. K. Moopanar	Kunnakudi Vaidyanathan
1997	Semmangudi Srinivasa Iyer	Sikkil Sisters
1998	N. Ram	Vellore G.Ramabadran
1999	Shanmughasundaram Mohan	T. N. Krishnan
2000	S. M. Krishna	Madurai T. N. Seshagopalan
2001	M. Balamuralikrishna	E. Gayathri
2002	T. N. Seshan	K. J. Yesudas
2003	S. Obul Reddy	Guruvayur Dorai
2004	Sri. B. Rajam Iyer	Kalyanpuram R. Aaaraavamudhachariar
2005	T. N. Krishnan	T. V. Sankaranarayanan
2006	Sri B.K.Krishnaraj Vanavarar	Bombay Sisters C. Saroja, C. Lalitha
2007	V. Sethuram	N. Ramani
2008	M. R. Sivaraman	S. Rajam
2009	Justice Prabha Sridevan	Prapancham Sitaram
2010	T. N. Krishnan	Manakkal S.Rangarajan
2011	N. Gopalaswami	Nedunuri Krishnamurthy
2012	V. Sethuram	M. S. Gopalakrishnan
2013	Nalli Kuppuswami Chetti	Kadri Gopalnath
2014	Chitra Visweswaran	A. Kanyakumari
2015	Gouri Parvathi Bayee	Tadepalli Lokanadha Sarma
2016	Padma Subrahmanyam	Sudha Ragunathan
