= Venkataramaiah =

Venkataramaiah is a surname. Notable people with the surname include:

- Alapati Venkataramaiah (1917–1965), Indian freedom fighter
- Papa Venkataramaiah (1901–1972), Indian violin player
- Perni Venkataramaiah, Indian politician
