= T. Rukmini =

Indian Carnatic violinist and vocalist

- Born: 27 November 1936; Bangalore, Karnataka, India
- Died: 31 May 2020 (aged 83)
- Occupations: Carnatic music violinist, vocalist
- Years active: 1950s–2020

T. Rukmini was an Indian Carnatic music violinist and vocalist, recognized for her contributions to South Indian classical music over a career spanning more than six decades. Known for her technical prowess and emotive performances, she accompanied many prominent Carnatic musicians and earned accolades such as the Sangeet Natak Akademi Award and the Sangita Kalanidhi.

== Early life and training ==
T. Rukmini was born and raised in Bangalore, Karnataka, where she began her musical training in both vocal music and the violin. She studied the violin under Vidwan R.R. Keshavamurthy, a noted musician who shaped her early career. Her talent was recognized early, leading her to pursue the violin professionally.

== Career ==
Rukmini made her debut as a teenager at the Town Hall in Bangalore, accompanying the renowned flautist T.R. Mahalingam. This marked her emergence as a leading accompanist during a period when female instrumentalists were rare. She performed with prominent Carnatic musicians, including Chembai Vaidyanatha Bhagavathar, S. Balachander, M.D. Ramanathan, Maharajapuram Santhanam, M.S. Subbulakshmi, M.L. Vasanthakumari, and D.K. Pattammal. Beyond accompaniment, she gave solo violin recitals and vocal concerts, including at the Sangeet Sammelan and a notable performance in Udupi featuring compositions by Purandara Dasa, which she set to tune. She also composed music for Andal’s Tiruppavai and songs by Subramania Bharati. Her international performances include a tour of the United States, where she again collaborated with Flute Mali. Her playing has been praised for its virtuosity and sweetness, with critics highlighting her ability to enhance both solo and accompaniment roles. She died on May 31, 2020.

== Awards and honors ==
T. Rukmini has received several awards, including:

- Sangita Kala Acharya from the Madras Music Academy in 2012, recognizing her lifetime achievement in Carnatic music. (https://musicacademymadras.in/sangita-kala-acharya/)
- Sangeet Natak Akademi Award for her contributions as a violinist.
- In 2022, she was felicitated in Bengaluru for completing 65 years as a musician.
