= Palghat Rama Bhagavathar =

Carnatic vocalist (1888-1957)

Palghat Rama Bhagavathar (5 June 1888 – 26 June 1957) was an Indian musician.

== Early life ==
Rama Bhagavathar was born in Mundaya (മുണ്ടായ) village near Shoranur, Palghat, Kerala. His father, Kasturi Ranganathan was a man of modest income. His mother was Alamelu Mangai. He took his early gurukulavasam with Palghat Anantarama Bhagavathar. He also learned music from Carnatic exponents like Maha Vaidyanatha Iyer. Umayalpuram Swaminatha Iyer who was a scion of the great composer Thyagaraja's musical lineage, taught him to learn a number of kritis of Tyagaraja. Maharajapuram Viswanatha Iyer was a fellow student and the two became friends.

== Career ==
His first Carnatic concert was at the Kalpathy Kasi Viswanatha Swamy Temple and so was his last concert.

He launched the Palghat (Palakkad) edition of the Tyagaraja Aradhana at Kalpathi Ram Dhyana Madom.

== Honours and titles ==
- Rama Bhagavathar was regularly invited by Maharaja of Mysore Jayachamaraja Wodeyar to his durbar during Dasara for a special performance and honoured him.
- Maharaja and Maharani of Travancore too honoured him.
- Nobel laureate C.V. Raman bestowed on him the title of Gayaka Kesari.

== Personal life ==
He died in May 1957 in Kalpathi, Kerala. His wife, Rugmani Ammal, died in 1991. The couple had 7 sons and 4 daughters.
