= Alathur Srinivasa Iyer =

Indian vocalist

Alathur Srinivasa Iyer (1911–1980), born in Tamil Nadu, was an Indian vocalist.

Srinivasa Iyer was born to Angarai Sankara Sroudigal and Lakshmi Ammal at Ariyalur village as one of 12 siblings. His younger brother A. S. Panchapakesa Iyer was also a teacher and publisher of music.

A student of Alathur Venkatesa Iyer, Srinivasa gave his first performances when he was ten years old. Together with Venkatesa Iyer's son Sivasubramania Iyer, he formed the successful duo known as the Alathur Brothers. He was awarded the Madras Music Academy's Sangeetha Kalanidhi in 1965. From 1944 to 1968, he was a court musician for the Maharajah of Travancore.

After the death of his musical partner, Alathur Sivasubramania Iyer, Srinivasa Iyer continued his concert career as a solo performer.
