= Pazhamaneri Swaminatha Iyer =

Indian Carnatic musician

Swaminatha Iyer
- Born: Palamaneri, Tamil Nadu, India
- Occupation: Musician
- Known for: Sangita Vidya Mahajana Sangam
- Style: Carnatic music
- Relatives: Mahathi (great-granddaughter)
- Awards: Sangita Kalanidhi
- Musical career
- Instrument: Violin

Swaminatha Iyer was a Carnatic musician and violinist from Palamaneri, Tamil Nadu, India. He was honored with the title of Sangita Kalanidhi by the Madras Music Academy in 1931, recognizing his contributions to Carnatic music.

== Early life and descendants ==
Iyer came from the village of Palamaneri (also known as Pazhamarneri) in the Thanjavur district of Tamil Nadu, India. His lineage and legacy continues through his great-granddaughter Mahathi, an established Carnatic vocalist and playback singer in the Indian film industry.

== Contributions to Carnatic music ==
In 1912, Iyer played an important role in the inception of Sangita Vidya Mahajana Sangam, a music conference organized by Abraham Pandithar. Iyer was one of the founding members and also presided over the afternoon session of the conference.

== Awards ==
- 1931: Sangita Kalanidhi, awarded by the Madras Music Academy. Also awarded the title of Gayaka Siromani.
