= T. S. Balakrishna Sastrigal =

Indian scholar

- Born: 1919; Madras
- Died: 2003 (aged 83–84)

Thiruvidaimarudur Sambamoorthy Kanapadigal Balakrishna Sastrigal (1919–2003) was a Hindu scholar, banker and harikatha exponent.

== Early life and education ==
TS Balakrishna Sastrigal was born in 1919 in the town of Madras, now known as Chennai, in Tamil Nadu, to Sambamoorthy Kanapadigal. Sambamoorthy Kanapadigal was a Vedic scholar who gave discourses.

Sastrigal had his schooling in Madras and graduated from the Madras Christian College. During his days in college, Balakrishna Sastrigal was proficient in English literature and acted in a few Shakespeare plays. He was fluent in several languages.

== Career ==
On completion of his studies, Sastrigal joined the Imperial Bank of India (now State Bank of India) and retired as Senior Executive of the State Bank of India.

== Personal life ==
Sastrigal was married to Smt. Nagalakshmi, daughter of Vedic scholar Somadeva Sarma (also the elder sister of Upansayam exponent Srivatsa Jayarama Sarma). Sastrigal's eldest son is Tamil actor, playwright and film director, T. S. B. K. Moulee. Another son, S. B. Khanthan is also a director in movies and on the small screen. His eldest daughter is Smt. Padma Ramanathan and youngest Smt. Sankari Ramanarayan.

== Awards ==
- Sangeetha Kalasikhamani, 1988, by The Indian Fine Arts Society, Chennai.
