= Vani (film) =

- Directed by: K. Hirannaiah; M. N. Gopal
- Produced by: T. Chowdaiah
- Starring: T. Chowdaiah; Bellary Lalitha; Pandari Bai; Musuri Krishnamurthy
- Music by: T. Chowdaiah
- Production company: Central Studios
- Distributed by: H. R. J. C and Sri Pictures
- Release date: 1943
- Running time: 185 minutes
- Country: India
- Language: Kannada

Vani ( transl. Violinist) is a 1943 Indian Kannada language musical drama film jointly directed by K. Hirannaiah and M. N. Gopal. Produced by T. Chowdaiah, the film featured himself in the lead role along with Bellary Lalitha and Bellary Rathnamala. Actress Pandari Bai and actor Musuri Krishnamurthy made their respective acting debuts in the film. Pandari Bai later became one of the most influential actresses in South Indian cinema. The film was shot and produced at Central Studios in Coimbatore.

The film, although began shooting in 1940, took three years to finally release onto the screens. The film fared badly at the box-office.

The film's highlight was the two reel length real classical concert of the classical exponent Chembai Vaidyanatha Bhagavathar being shot completely.

== Cast ==
- T. Chowdaiah
- Bellary Lalitha
- Bellary Rathnamala
- Pandari Bai
- Musuri Krishnamurthy
- K. Hirannaiah
- K. V. Achyutha Rao

== External sources ==
- Vani at IMDb
