= Bidaram Krishnappa =

Carnatic Indian musician (1866–1931)

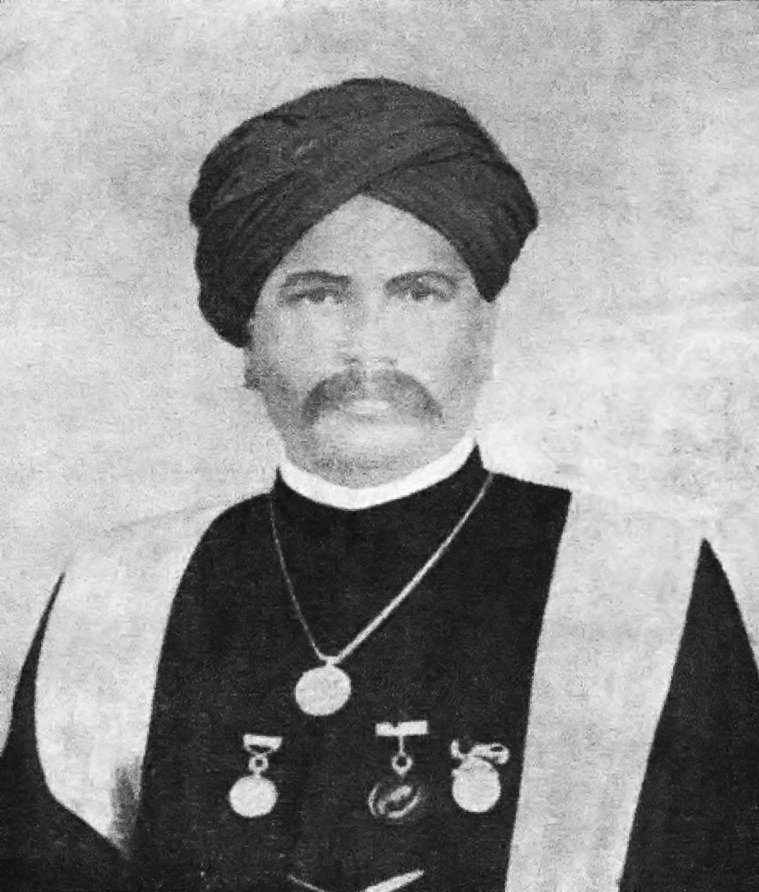

Background information
- Born: 1866
- Origin: Dakshina Kannada, Karnataka
- Died: 1931 (aged 64–65)
- Genre: Carnatic music
- Occupation: Court Musician of Wodeyars of Mysore
- Instruments: Harmonium, Violin
- Parent(s): Vishwanathayya Kini and Saraswathi Bai

Bidaram Krishnappa (1866–1931) was a musician and composer of Carnatic Indian music in the court of Maharaja Chamaraja Wodeyar IX (1862–1894) and Krishna Raja Wadiyar IV (1884–1940) of the Kingdom of Mysore.

Bidaram Krishnappa was a Konkani-speaking Gowda Saraswath Brahmin and a native of Nandalike in modern Udupi district, Karnataka. His parents were Vishwanathayya Kini and Saraswathi Bai. When he was a boy he had a chance encounter with a rich businessman who loved music. This happened when a hungry Krishnappa, who came from a poor family, was singing a devotional song (devaranama) at a local temple. Impressed with his voice, the merchant sponsored Krishnappa to train under the guidance of a musician called Ramaswamy. He later came under the influence of Tammayya and Veena Sheshanna. Bidaram Krishnappa is credited with having popularised the singing of Kannada devaranama on stage. He adapted certain concepts of Hindustani music into his Carnatic compositions. For his scholarship in music, he earned the titles "Shudda Swaracharya", "Pallavi Krishnappa" and "Gana Visharada". One of his disciples, T. Chowdiah, went on to become a music legend.

Vidwan Harmonium S Bheem Rao was also his disciple who was famous for playing Carnatic music both on Harmonium and Violin. Vidwan B Raghuram is son of Vidwan S Bheem Rao. Krishnappa was most famous for writing and rendering devaranama and kirtans.

== Well-known disciples ==
- Tirumakudalu Chowdiah
- R. R. Keshavamurthy
- Rallapalli Anantha Krishna Sharma

== Places in honour ==
A road is named after Bidaram Krishnappa, named as Bidaram Krishnappa Street in Subbarayanakere area of Devaraja Mohalla in Mysore. There is a Temple i.e., Sri Prasanna Sitarama Mandira established by Bidaram Krishnappa himself. In this Temple, Cultural programs will be conducted during Rama Navami festival.
