= Prameela Gurumurthy =

Indian classical musician and musicologist (born 1954)

- Born: M. Prameela; 5 October 1954 (age 72); Tamil Nadu
- Occupations: Singer, musicologist, Harikatha exponent
- Spouse: R. Gurumurthy
- Parents: S. Cunjithapatham (father); Amutham (mother)
- Awards: Sangeet Natak Akademi Award (2022)
- Musical career
- Genre: Indian classical music
- Instrument: Vocals

Prameela Gurumurthy (also spelled as Premeela Gurumurthy) is an Indian classical vocalist, Harikatha exponent and musicologist from Tamil Nadu. She held several positions including the dean of the music department in Vels University, dean of the University of Madras and the Vice-Chancellor of the Tamil Nadu Music and Fine Arts University. She received the Sangeet Natak Akademi Award in 2022.

== Biography ==
Prameela Gurumurthy was born on October 5, 1954, to Amutham and S. Cunjithapatham, in a musical family in Tamil Nadu. Her parents hails from Kottayam in Kerala state and Tirunelveli in Tamil Nadu respectively. Started learning Carnatic music at a very early age, she started to perform at concerts from the age of twelve. The family later moved to Chennai. It was musician Musiri Subramania Iyer, who recognized her talent very early, and persuaded the family to move to Chennai. She performed at the Thiruvaiyaru Thyagaraja Utsavam in 1969. Her first major concert in Chennai was in 1970.

Prameela Gurumurthy received her training in Carnatic music from prominent musicians including Mudicondan Venkatarama Iyer, B. Rajam Iyer, T. M. Thiyagarajan, T. Muktha and T. K. Govindarao. She also studied Hindustani classical music under Krishnanand of the Kirana gharana, and done her debut concert in Hindusthani in the year 1984.

Prameela is also an exponent in Harikatha. She was trained in Harikatha under C. Banni Bai and Embar Vijayaraghavachariariar.

Prameela joined Queen Mary's College, Chennai, affiliated to the University of Madras, and graduated in Indian Music from there in November 1974, winning the prize for practical music. She later done master's degree in Indian Philosophy from 1974 to 1976, a master's degree in Indian Music (both at the University of Madras) and also completed a doctorate on 'Kathakalashebham'.

== Career ==
Prameela Gurumurthy served as the president and chairperson of the School of Fine and Performing Arts at the University of Madras, professor and head of the department of Indian music, University of Madras, dean of the music department in Vels University, dean of the University of Madras and later as the Vice-Chancellor of the Tamil Nadu Music and Fine Arts University. She is the first musician who is equally proficient in Carnatic and Hindustani music as well as Tamil devotional songs, to become Tamil Nadu Music and Fine Arts University vice-chancellor. She played a key role in introducing new courses, including postgraduate degrees in Bharatanatyam, Folk music, Rhythmology, and Dramaturgy, at the Madras university, when she was the dean.

== Contributions ==
Prameela Gurumurthy has performed in over 400 concerts, taken musical lectures and other lectures at hundreds of venues in India and abroad. Prameela is also proficient in devotional songs in Indian languages such as Sanskrit, Tamil, Telugu, Kannada, Marathi, Hindi, and Gujarati. She also has several music releases in her credit, featuring her classical and devotional songs.

As musicologist Premeela is specialized in ancient Tamil music, music history and composers. She has done studies on ancient Tamil musical forms like Tevaram, Naalayira Divya Prabandham, Tiruppukal and the compositions of Gopalakrishna Bharati, Ramalinga Swamigal, Papanasam Sivan and Periyasaamy Thooran. Her scholarly works has significantly enriched the understanding of ancient Tamil music, Indian classical music and Tamil literature.

Prameela is a person who played a significant role in the revival of the art form 'Kathakalashepa', a traditional musical story telling performance that presents Indian epics such as the Ramayana, Mahabharata, Puranas, and other stories in a unique style. Her doctorate is also on Kathakalashepa. She has also written a book on this art form.

Prameela Gurumurthy has authored several publications, including Gopalakrishna Bharathiyar published by Sahitya Akademi, and Musings of Music published by the University of Madras. She has also translated Nurturing Music and Fine Arts - A Historical Perspective, a book on Tamil Nadu's musical traditions, written in English by Carnatic music historian V. Sriram into Tamil.

== Awards and honors ==
In 2018, Prameela Gurumurthy received the Musicologist Award from Madras Music Academy. In 2022, she received the Sangeet Natak Akademi Award from Sangeet Natak Akademi, Government of India. In 2025, she received Karthik Lifetime Achievement Award from Kartik Fine Arts sabha. She also received several other awards and titles including Isai Kalai Chelvar, Acharya Ratnakara Award, and Acharya Choodamani.

To mark 50 years of her concert performances, the Madras Music Academy released a golden jubilee special souvenir in 2017 December. A program titled 'Guru Samarpana' was also organized to commemorate 50 years of her musical journey.
