= Alathur Brothers =

Carnatic vocalists

The Alathur Brothers
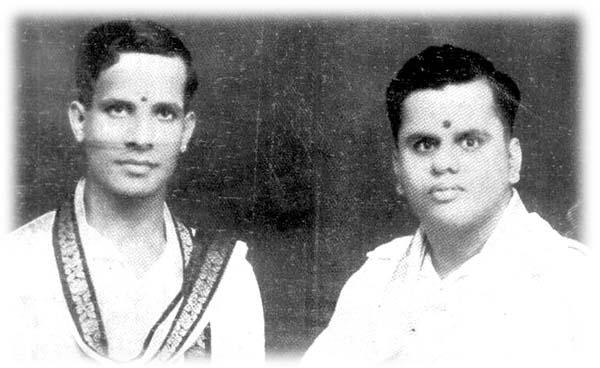
- The Alathur Brothers

The Alathur Brothers, comprising Srinivasa Iyer (1911–1980) & Sivasubramania Iyer (1916–1965) were Carnatic vocalists. They were not brothers by birth.

Srinivasa Iyer was born as one of 12 siblings to Angarai Sankara Sroudigal and Lakshmi Ammal at Ariyalur. Sivasubramania Iyer was the son of Alathur Venkatesa Iyer who taught Srinivasa Iyer and Sivasubramania Iyer.

They gave their first concert at Thyagaraja Aradhana festival in Thiruvaiyaru in 1928. Following the grand tradition set by their guru, the duo excelled in the authentic version of Carnatic music bringing together its technicalities to develop a taste for this patantara in the audience, both the experts and the laymen, alike.

The Alathur brothers performed with most of the star accompanists of the world of Carnatic music. On the violin, earlier they were accompanied by Thiruvalangadu Sundaresa Iyer, Mayavaram V. R. Govindaraja Pillai, Kumbakonam Rajamanickam Pillai, Mysore T. Chowdiah among others. Later T. N. Krishnan and Lalgudi G. Jayaraman accompanied them in most of their concerts while Kandadevi S. Alagiriswamy accompanied them in a few.

From 1944 to 1968 the brothers were the court musicians for Chithira Thirunal Balarama Varma, the Maharajah of Travancore. They were awarded the prestigious Sangeetha Kalanidhi award in two consecutive years, 1964 and 1965.
