= Kandadevi S. Alagiriswamy =

- Born: 21 April 1925; Kandadevi, Sivaganga district, Tamil Nadu State, India
- Died: 13 October 2000 (aged 75) Chennai, Tamil Nadu State, India
- Genres: Carnatic music – Indian Classical Music
- Occupation: Carnatic Violinist
- Years active: 1940–2000

Kandadevi Sundararaja Alagiriswamy (1925–2000) was a Carnatic violinist.

== Early life ==
He was born on April 21, 1925, in the village of Kandadevi near Devakottai, Sivaganga district in Tamil Nadu to S. Sundararaja Iyengar and Alimelu Ammal.

He initially had his training under his grandfather Srinivasa Iyengar and then under Kandadevi Chellam Iyengar.

He had his advanced training under T. Chowdaiah.

== Career ==
Alagiriswamy's debut performance was accompanying his guru Chowdiah's solo concert in Mysore. Thereafter he has accompanied Carnatic music stalwarts of the time including M. S. Subbulakshmi, M. L. Vasanthakumari, P. S. Narayanaswamy and several others.

== Overseas performance ==
Alagiriswamy was the accompanying violinist to M. S. Subbulakshmi when she performed at the Festival of India at London in 1982.

He has accompanied other singers and travelled to various countries including the UK, USA, Japan and many other countries.

== Awards and felicitations ==
- Sangeet Natak Akademi Award, 1991
- Kalaimamani Award by Tamil Nadu government, 1978
- Tanti Nada Visarada by Kanchi Kamakoti Peetam.
- Vadya Ratna by Academy of Music and Arts.

== Death ==
Alagiriswamy died on 13 October 2000 in Chennai at the age of 75.
