= Tiruchy L. Saravanan =

Indian Carnatic flautist

Tiruchy L. Saravanan, also known as Flute Saravanan, is a prime disciple of Dr. N. Ramani, one of India's pioneer Carnatic flautists.

== Education ==
Saravanan is also a disciple of the late Sri K. S. Narayanan (senior most disciple of Sri Mali), the late V. Sundaresan, and the eminent violinist Nagai R. Muralidharan, Saravanan is a Yuvakalabharathy Award winner. Trained as a vocalist equally, Saravanan incorporates both the demands of vocal and instrumental techniques in his renditions satisfying the needs of the composition rather than the wants of the audience.

He began at the age of 10 in both vocal and Carnatic flute. After several years of schooling in music under renowned teachers, he started performing by the age 14 in All India Radio, Tiruchy. After several years of performing experience, he got the rare privilege of learning under the Flute Maestro, Dr. N. Ramani aided by the Govt. of India Advanced Learning sponsorship. Dr. N. Ramani himself is the direct disciple of Mali, who elevated the status of the flute in Carnatic concerts with vocal techniques. Dr. N. Ramani polished his teacher's methodology to high vocal standards and brought a new image and dimension to Indian Classical Music in the 1900s. Saravanan, being trained under vocal and violin teachers assimilated Dr. N. Ramani's techniques aptly.

He performs in Ramani's Academy of Flute regularly and with Dr. N. Ramani, Saravanan has taken part in uniques flute concerts like 5-flute concert incorporating a series of flutes in a single concert.

He has made solo albums with recording companies like Kalavardhini with his own gurus accompanying like the violin exponent Nagai Muralidharan and the famed mridangist Srimushanam V. Raja Rao.

== National recognition and awards ==
Saravanan has received several awards and titles for his performances, in particular, the Senior Fellowship from the Government of India and the Yuvakalabarathy award.

He also received the Saptha Swara Kulal Isai Mani and the Senior Flautist awards from the Madras Music Academy. In the Rama Gana Sabha in Hyderabad, Andhra Pradesh he was honoured as Venu Gana Nipuna.

He was a Flute lecturer with the Tamil Nadu Government Music College before he joined the SIFAS Academy as a Carnatic Vocal and Flute Tutor in January 2004.

Saravanan has accompanied musicians including Padmashri Sudha Raghunathan, Nithyashree Mahadevan, Bombay Jayashri, Kalaimamani A. K. C. Natarajan in clarinet and flute duets, Sangeetha Kalanidhi and Padma Bhushan T.N.Seshagopalan, Sangeet Saamrat Chitravina N. Ravikiran and chiefly Padma Vibushan Mangalampalli Balamuralikrishna on world tours.

He has also performed with other famous accompanying artistes such as the tavil exponent Padmashri Valayaptti A. R. Subramaniam and Haridwaramangalam A. K. Palanivel, the violin exponent Kumari A. Kanyakumari. He has also given Santoor-Flute Jugalbhandi concerts with the late R. Visweswaran, a disciple of the Santoor Maestro Pt. Shivkumar Sharma.

His involvement in the dance fraternity is respectable being an accompanist to dance exponents such in the likes of Padmashri Smt. Sudharani Raghupathi, Padmashri Smt. Chitra Visweswaran and Padmashri Dr. Smt. Saraswathi Sundaresan.

His copious fluidity in sangathi creation, strong raga bhava and apt control of rhythm got him the 1st prize in the All India Radio National Flute Competition in 1990 and has also won the gold medal in the Calcutta Youth Festival in 1996.

== Contribution in Singapore ==
Saravanan is also a composer in the National Arts Council of Singapore (NAC) in the biennial National Indian Music Competition which showcases budding talents in the field of Indian Classical Music. The SIFAS octet ensemble which he composed in 2004 won the second prize in the competition.

Saravanan's natural gift in understanding the nuances of Carnatic music, put him on the edge over other composer musicians in Singapore. His sensitivity and almost near diction in orchestrating Indian classical music is noteworthy. In 2006, he again created the SIFAS ensemble now with a ten-member team incorporating North Indian music instruments such as tabla and sitar in a Carnatic music orchestral piece, a unique ragatalamalika with different ragas and talas, blending with the traditional South Indian instruments with a pair of violins, a pair of support vocalists, flute, mridangam, and ghatam. In a challenging NAC National Indian Music competition, he won the second prize again and winning critical acclaim from the judges and the audience for his individual effort and unique creativity in orchestrating a Carnatic music ensemble blending North and South Indian music instruments. Bringing the sitar and veena, the tabla and mridangam in a single platform was conducted by him for the first time in a national music competition in Singapore.

Saravanan has also composed several other compositions for the institution and in the year 2006, he also composed for the President of India, Dr. A P J Abdul Kalam a ragamalika based on the President's own poems, in a cultural show in SIFAS celebrating the visit of the president to SIFAS and was well received by the President himself.

== The experimentalist ==
Saravanan is one of the few Carnatic flautists in the world, who has tailor made his flutes ranging from the venu to the bansuri by himself, partly due to his skill in recognising the accuracy of the swaras, which are often difficult to achieve in flutes. By recreating the 7 hole bansuri flute in the bamboo (from Kerala) used by venu flutes, he has widened the avenue of Carnatic style Bansuri playing in Carnatic music which was pioneered by his famous guru. This is a tediously time-consuming process taking years to form in timbre and quality before reaching the concert platform. In using these heavier yet deep base flutes which often require heavy blowing techniques as in the venu flutes to achieve the tonal clarity of the bansuri flutes made of the Assam bamboo, he is able to bridge the worlds of both the bansuri and the venu into a single classical dimension by playing both North and South Indian ragas with ease.

This tireless effort has easily allowed him to collaborate with North Indian artistes such as the Orissi exponent Sonal Man Singh as he is able to bridge Carnatic techniques and North Indian ragas well. To increase his repertoire, he also performs in rare ragas, to explore more possibilities with the Carnatic flute.

== A teacher of purity ==
As a Carnatic vocal and flute teacher, Saravanan imparts a performing verve to his students and the emphasis of practical presentation over theoretical knowledge proves that he is the torch bearer of Dr. N. Ramani's legacy. Just like his famous guru, his method of instruction is inclined towards excellent clarity of swarasthana with a high standard of classical tradition. Emphasising on the strong tradition of chaste Carnatic music strictly refraining from any form of popular music influences.

In Singapore, he has won the respect and blessings of the most famous critic in Singapore's Carnatic music fraternity; Viswakala Bharathi Shri Eelanallur S. Sathyalingam, the music director of Apsaras Arts Ltd. A disciple of famous doyens like Mysore Vasudevachar, Karaikudi Sambasiva Iyer and Papanasam Sivan in Kalakshetra, Shri Sathyalingam's music is synonymous with orthodox and tradition.

Saravanan's students include students of all age groups and even a student of Dr. N. Ramani, who is currently the music director of the Indian orchestra in the National University of Singapore.

Saravanan is also exploring inspiration from other genres of classical music from Hindustani to Western classical with even showing interest in Greek, Persian, and Chinese music to reach a yet higher level of performance in his concerts without altering the very fabric of Carnatic music.

He has also founded a pioneer institution in Singapore, Vamshidwani in July 2007 to propagate and popularise the Carnatic flute in Singapore and around the region.
