= Revathy Krishna =

Indian vainika

Revathy Krishna ரேவதி கிருஷ்ணா
- Born: Revathy Chelvakumar
- Genre: Carnatic
- Occupation: Musician
- Instrument: Veena

Revathy Krishna (Tamil: ரேவதி கிருஷ்ணா) is an Indian vainika renowned for her proficiency in both carnatic classical as well as Light music and film music.

== Early life ==
Revathy Krishna, born as Revathy Chelvakumar, was the daughter of Chelvakumar and Lakshmi. Revathy's brother, Chandran is now a retired cosmetic surgeon. Hailing from the disciple lineage of composer Thyagaraja, she is the great grand daughter of Thillaisthanam Rama Iyengar, the devoted disciple of saint Thyagaraja. After getting initial training in vocals from Therali Ramaswami Iyengar in Madurai, she picked up veena at the age of 12, and spotting her keen interest, her mother put her under the watchful tutelage of Sundaram Iyer. She later on fine tuned her art under Sharada Shivanandam and K.P.Sivanandam.

== Film music ==
She also performs in films and film songs on stage, with many audio and video albums to her credit. Her rendition of Rajnikanth, Kamal Hassan and A. R. Rahman songs in veena are a hit among the music fans.

== Performances ==
- Special recital for the Governor or Tamil Nadu, P.S Ram Mohan Rao at Raj Bhavan.
- Special performance for the President of India Dr. A.P.J.Abdul Kalam.
- Performed at the World Tamil Conference in July 2012.
- Performed at Veena Navarathri organised by Delhi-based Veena Foundation and Indira Gandhi National Centre for Arts in 2007.
- Regularly performs at the Thyagaraja Aradhana at Thiruvaiyaru.

== Awards and achievements ==
- Kalaimamani Award for excellence in Veena.
- Kumar Gandharwa Award in 2008
