= Delhi P. Sunder Rajan =

- Also known as: "DPS"
- Origin: New Delhi, India
- Genres: Carnatic Music; World Music; Indian Classical Music
- Instruments: violin, viola, vocals
- Labels: Cauvery Records
- Website: www.sunderrajan.com

Delhi P. Sunder Rajan is a violinist-vocalist of India performing South Indian Classical music (Carnatic music) . He is known for his improvisations and style of playing.
