= Maharajapuram Santhanam =

Carnatic vocalist from Tamilnadu, India

Padma Shri, Kalaimamani, Sangita Kalanidhi Maharajapuram Santhanam
- Born: 20 May 1928; Sirunangur, Tanjore District, Madras Presidency, British India (now in Ariyalur district, Tamil Nadu, India)
- Died: 24 June 1992 (aged 64); Kooteripattu, South Arcot District (now in Viluppuram District), Tamil Nadu, India
- Occupations: Carnatic vocalist
- Children: 2, Maharajapuram S. Ramachandran and Maharajapuram S. Srinivasan
- Parents: Maharajapuram Viswanatha Iyer (father); Visalakshi (mother)

Maharajapuram Santhanam (20 May 1928 – 24 June 1992) was an Indian Carnatic vocalist. He was awarded the Madras Music Academy's Sangita Kalanidhi in 1989.

== Early life ==
Santhanam was born on 20 May 1928 at Sirunangur, a village in the Tanjavur district of Tamil Nadu. He followed in the footsteps of his father Maharajapuram Viswanatha Iyer who was also a renowned Carnatic vocalist. His mother was Visalakshi.

== Career ==
Besides studying with his father, he was also a disciple of Melattur Sama Dikshitar. Maharajapuram Santhanam was also a distinguished composer. He wrote many songs about Murugan and Kanchi Shankaracharya, Sri Chandrasekarendra Saraswati Swamigal (Maha Periyavar). He was the principal of Ramanathan College in Sri Lanka. Later he came and settled in Chennai. The songs which were popularised by Maharajapuram Santhanam are,"Bho Shambo" (Revati), "Madhura Madhura" (Bagheshri), both composed by Swami Dayananda Saraswati, "Unnai Allal" (Kalyani Raga), "Sadha Nin Padhame gathi, Varam onnru" (Shanmukhapriya), "Srichakra Raja" (Ragamalika), "Nalinakaanthimathim" (Ragamalika),"Ksheerabdi kannike" (Ragamalika), "Thillana (Revathy)" among others.

His other most popular songs are Purandaradasa kritis: "Narayana ninna" (Shuddha Dhanyasi) and "Govinda ninna". His rendition of "Vilayada ithu nerama muruga" was without parallel. His renditions were full of Bhakthi.

His last concert was at Swami Dayananda Matriculation School in which Nagai Shri Muralidharan (Violin), Shri B Hari Kumar (Mridangam) and Dr R Ganesh(Vocal support) participated. His cousin's grand daughterBaby Akila also rendered a song on stage

== Death ==
On 24 June 1992, Santhanam died in a car accident in Kooteripattu, a village near Tindivanam in present-day Viluppuram district, Tamil Nadu. His cousin Shri Ramanathan also died on spot and Baby Akila died later. His wife Smt Gnanam Santhanam survived though severely injured.

== Legacy ==
The Maharajapuram Santhanam Day is celebrated on 3 December every year.

His sons Maharajapuram S. Srinivasan, Maharajapuram S. Ramachandran, and his primary disciple Dr. R. Ganesh are now carrying on his musical tradition.

In Chennai, Griffith Road in T.Nagar was renamed as 'Maharajapuram Santhanam Salai' in honor of Maharajapuram Santhanam as requested by his disciple Dr R Ganesh to the Government of Tamil Nadu on 23Rd June 1998 in which Shri M K Stalin, Semmangudi Shri Srinivasa Iyer, Lalgudi Shri Jayaraman, Shri M S Viswanathan, Shri V Ramamurthy and Dr R Ganesh participated. The street has the famous Krishna Gana Sabha and Muppathamman Temple.

== Awards and titles ==
- Padma Shri - 1990
- Sangeetha Kalanidhi from the Madras Music Academy - 1989
- Sangeet Natak Akademi award - 1984
- Kalaimamani award by Tamil Nadu Government
- "Sangeetha Sudhakara" by the Yoga vedanta University at Rishikesh
- "Gana Kalanidhi" by Sri Chandrasekhara Bharati of Sringeri Sharada Peetha
- "Sangitha Sagaramritha Varshi" by Jayendra Saraswathi of Kanchi Kamakoti Peetham.
- A former "Asthana Vidwan" of the Tirumala Tirupati Devasthanams, Kanchi Kamakoti Peetham, Pittsburgh Venkatachalapathi Temple and the Ganapathi Sachidananda Ashrama
