= Indian Music Experience Museum =

Coordinates: 12.8918°N 77.5837°E

The Indian Music Experience Museum (IME) is India's first interactive music museum, located in Jayaprakash Nagar, Bengaluru Urban, Karnataka. Established in 2019, the museum is dedicated to preserving and showcasing Indian musical heritage through interactive exhibits and educational programs. The non-profit institution is supported by the Brigade Group and occupies 50,000 square feet of space across three floors.

== Overview ==
The museum features nine exhibit galleries, an outdoor Sound Garden, and a Learning Centre. Its primary mission is to document and present various forms of Indian music, ranging from classical traditions like Hindustani and Carnatic music to contemporary genres including Bollywood and indie pop. The institution emphasizes interactive learning experiences through multimedia displays and hands-on exhibits.

== Facilities ==
=== Exhibition galleries ===
The museum houses nine thematic galleries that showcase different aspects of Indian music through artifacts, instruments, and multimedia installations. The galleries include:

- The Stars Gallery: A hall of fame featuring memorabilia from musicians such as Ustad Bismillah Khan and M.S. Subbulakshmi
- Songs of Struggle: Dedicated to music's role in India's independence movement, featuring various versions of "Vande Mataram" and other patriotic songs
- Living Traditions: Focuses on fundamental concepts of Hindustani classical music, including ragas, talas, and various gharanas
- Contemporary Expressions: Showcases modern Indian music genres like Indi-pop and rock music
- Melting pot:

=== Sound Garden ===
The outdoor Sound Garden features ten interactive musical installations designed for hands-on exploration of sound. Key installations include:

- Humming Stone
- Singing Stone
- Storm Drum

These installations allow visitors to experience sound creation through physical interaction.

=== Learning Centre ===
The Learning Centre offers structured music education programs, including:

- Diploma programs in various musical disciplines
- Workshops on music appreciation
- Classes in:
  - Carnatic vocal
  - Hindustani vocal
  - Mridangam
  - Guitar

== Educational programs ==
The museum conducts regular educational initiatives aimed at both children and adults. These include:

- Regular workshops on sound science
- Historical lectures on musical instruments
- Live performances showcasing various musical traditions
- Community engagement programs

== Development and support ==
The museum's development spanned over a decade before its opening in 2019. The project received primary support from the Brigade Group, with additional backing from various cultural organizations committed to preserving India's musical heritage.

== See also ==
- List of music museums
- Indian classical music
