= Palghat R. Raghu =

Burmese singer (1928–2009)

- Born: Palghat Ramaswamy Raghu; 9 January 1928; Rangoon, Burma (present-day Yangon, Myanmar)
- Died: 2 June 2009 (aged 81)
- Occupations: carnatic musician, percussionist
- Spouse: Swarnambal
- Parent(s): Palghat Ramasamy Iyer, Ananthalakshmi Ammal

Palghat R. Raghu (9 January 1928 – 2 June 2009) was a Carnatic musician and percussionist. He was awarded the Madras Music Academy's Sangeetha Kalanidhi in 2007.

== Early life and education ==
Palghat Ramaswamy Raghu was born on 9 January 1928 in Rangoon, Burma (now Yangon, Myanmar) to Palghat Ramaswamy Iyer and Ananthalakshmi Ammal. He inherited his musical inclination from his mother and his aunt, both of whom were proficient singers, as well as his grandfather, Radhakrishna Iyer, a respected authority on Carnatic music in Rangoon. As a child, he was immensely talented and inducted into mridangam lessons very early in his life.

His initial training in percussion was under a teacher named Swamy in Rangoon. Following the outbreak of World War II and the impending wartime evacuation, his family relocated to Madras in 1939, where he came under the tutelage of Thinniam Venkatarama Iyer and later Trichy Raghava Iyer. While still in his teens, Raghu made his official concert debut accompanying the legendary composer Papanasam Sivan.

In 1940, the family moved to Palghat, allowing Raghu to undergo rigorous, traditional gurukulam training under the mridangam maestro Palghat Mani Iyer. He subsequently married Swarnambal, the niece of his guru. Alongside his music, Raghu pursued academic studies, graduating with a degree in Mathematics from Victoria College in Palghat. This mathematical background heavily influenced his later approach to complex rhythmic structures.

== Musical Style and Technique ==
Palghat R. Raghu was highly regarded for his precise fingering technique and complex mathematical calculations (kanakkus). He belonged to the Palghat school of mridangam playing, having absorbed the foundational aesthetics of his guru, Palghat Mani Iyer. Raghu was particularly celebrated for his execution of the thoppi (the left-hand bass side of the drum), producing a deep, resonant, and tonal modulation that perfectly complemented vocalists. The legendary vocalist G. N. Balasubramaniam famously remarked that he was fascinated by Raghu's profound sangeetha gnanam (knowledge of music), describing Raghu as "one of his eyes."

Rather than merely keeping time, Raghu treated rhythmic accompaniment as an active commentary on the text and emotional landscape of the composition (sahitya). His solo segments (tani avartanam) were characterized by highly intricate, innovative, and mathematical patterns (korvais). He performed memorable percussive dialogues alongside other rhythm virtuosos of his era, including G. Harishankar (kanjira), Alangudi Ramachandran, and T. H. "Vikku" Vinayakaram (ghatam). He seamlessly bridged the gap between traditional Carnatic kutcheri frameworks and multi-percussive ensembles, frequently performing in unique Taal Vadya Kacheri (percussion ensemble) collaborations alongside Hindustani maestros like Ustad Alla Rakha, Ustad Zakir Hussain, and Pandit Kishan Maharaj.

== Global Outreach and Collaborations ==
Raghu was a pioneer in introducing Carnatic percussion to global audiences and bridging East-West classical traditions. In 1965, he performed at the historic Edinburgh International Festival. Throughout his career, he toured extensively across Europe, the United States, Australia, Malaysia, and Singapore, performing with global artists such as Sitar Maestro Pandit Ravi Shankar, Flute legend Hariprasad Chaurasia, Santoor virtuoso Shivkumar Sharma, and the Tabla wizards Ustad Alla Rakha and Ustad Zakir Hussain.

He was deeply involved in cross-cultural and East-West fusion music. To foster global academic understanding of Indian rhythm, Raghu served as a visiting professor of music at Wesleyan University in Connecticut, San Diego State University, and the University of California, Berkeley. He also regularly conducted advanced mridangam classes for the benefit of his students and upcoming mridangam artists.

== Selected Discography ==
Raghu's performances were widely recorded and distributed globally, notably through field recordings and official studio albums during his international tours in the 1960s and 1970s:

- Festival from India (1968) – A landmark double-LP produced by World Pacific Records, directed by Pandit Ravi Shankar. Raghu provided mridangam accompaniment, collaborating in cross-cultural percussive segments alongside Ustad Alla Rakha on tabla.
- Bhāvālu / Impressions: South Indian Instrumental Music (1969) – Released via World Pacific/Liberty Records, featuring K. V. Narayanaswamy (vocal), V. V. Subramaniam (violin), and Palghat Raghu (mridangam).
- Dhyānam / Meditation: South Indian Vocal Music (1969) – Released by Nonesuch Records as part of their Explorer Series, documenting traditional Carnatic concert dynamics for Western educational distribution.

== Awards ==
- Sangeetha Choodamani by Sri Krishna Gana Sabha, Chennai (1978)
- Kerala Sangeetha Nataka Akademi Fellowship (1979)
- Sangeet Natak Akademi Award (1983)
- Palghat Mani Iyer Award (First recipient)
- Padma Shri (1985)
- Mridangam Chakravarty Award
- Kalaimamani (Tamil Nadu)
- Mridangam Nada Mani (Shankaracharya)
- Nada Brahmam — Award from Narada Gana Sabha (2000)
- Nada Nidhi (2001)
- Sangeetha Kalanidhi by the Madras Music Academy (2007)

== Legacy and Lineage ==
Over a career lasting more than six decades, Raghu accompanied five generations of musicians. This included old-world stalwarts like Maharajapuram Viswanatha Iyer, Madurai Mani Iyer, Semmangudi Srinivasa Iyer, Ariyakudi Ramanuja Iyengar, the Alathur Brothers, Chembai Vaidyanatha Bhagavathar, and K. V. Narayanaswamy, instrumental maestros like Lalgudi Jayaraman, T. N. Krishnan, and N. Ramani, as well as younger generation prodigies.

As an educator, Raghu trained an extensive lineage of disciples who carried forward his school of playing (bani). His prominent students include Trichur C. Narendran, Bombay Balaji, Manoj Siva, and Trivandrum Balaji. His musical legacy also famously continued through his family: his son, Ramkumar, became a mridangist, and his grandsons inherited his musical genius—Abhishek Raghuram emerged as a highly acclaimed contemporary Carnatic vocalist, while Anantha R. Krishnan became a leading, highly successful maestro of the mridangam, both of whom Raghu personally mentored and accompanied in their early careers.
