= Kooteripattu =

Kooteripattu is the developing village from India, located at Tamil Nadu state in Villupuram district.

Kooteripattu is the area connected with national highway road from Chennai to Trichy also roadlines to Pondicherry and Gingee. Famous temples lord muruga mailam temple located on small hills. Mailam railway station is situated in kootteripattu, west from the road junction. There are two lakes in the village which meet together, from where the name of the village originated. Thiruvakarai goddess Vakrakalli temple located near Kooteipattu. It is 20 km away from Pondicherry.

== How To Reach Kootteripattu ==
=== By Rail ===
Mailam Rail Way Station, Perani Rail Way Station are the very nearby railway stations to Kootteripattu.

== Colleges near Kootteripattu ==
- Mailam Engineering College
- Bwda Arts & Science College
- Annammal College of Education For Women
- Law College Govt

== Politics in Kootteripattu ==
DMK, AIADMK, PMK are the major political parties in this area.

== Schools in Kootteripattu ==
- Ghs Kooteripattu
- St. John Mat. Kooteripattu
