= Prapancham Sitaram =

- Origin: Andhra Pradesh, India
- Genres: Classical, Carnatic
- Occupations: Flautist, composer
- Years active: 1950- 1 June 2014

Prapancham Sitaram was a Carnatic flautist from the state of Andhra Pradesh, India. Sitaram was a disciple of flautist T.R. Mahalingam and was a top artist in the All India Radio. He served as head of many institutions in Andhra Pradesh and directed approximately 32 dissertations in various subjects like 'Sadhana in Carnatic Music', 'Nuances of Composers', and 'Evolution of Indian Music'. Sitaram has trained students in Carnatic flute, including Balasai and Shreyas Sridhar. He was based in Triplicane, Chennai.

Sitaram was married with two children. Sitaram died in Atlanta, US, on 1 June 2014.

== Awards ==
- Sangeetha Kalasikhamani, 2009 By The Indian Fine Arts Society, Chennai.
