= Papa Venkataramaiah =

Indian violin player

Papa Venkataramaih (1901–1972) was among the most prominent Indian violin players in the first half of the 20th century.

== Playing Style ==
K. S. Venkataramaiah, known as 'Papa', was born on 12 September 1901 as the second son of violinist Karur Srikantiah. He learned violin under Chinnaswami Iyer (a recipient of Sangeeta Kalanidhi award) and Govindaswami Pillai.

Papa was devoted to Veena Dhanammal school, and one of his first disciples was T. Abhiramasundari, sister of Brinda and Muktha, and granddaughter of Dhanammal. V P Raman, former Advocate General of Tamil Nadu, evinced keen interest in Carnatic music and was an excellent violinist, who had his training under the great master Papa Venkataramaiah. Two of Papa's sons - V Thyagarajan and V Nagarajan - also became sought-after accompanists. V Tyagarajan (b 1927) made a name for himself as a violinist. Nagarajan (approx 1930 - 2002) was a left-handed Khanjira player. Aniruddha Atreya, Khanjira exponent from the early decades of 21st C, is Tyagarajan's grandson and Papa's great-grandson.

The legendary singer Ariyakudi Ramanuja Iyengar preferred Papa as his violin accompanist.

== Awards ==
Papa Venkataramaiah was honoured with Sangeetha Kalanidhi award in 1962.
