= T. N. Krishnan =

Indian musician (1928–2020)

Sangeetha Kalanidhi T. N. Krishnan
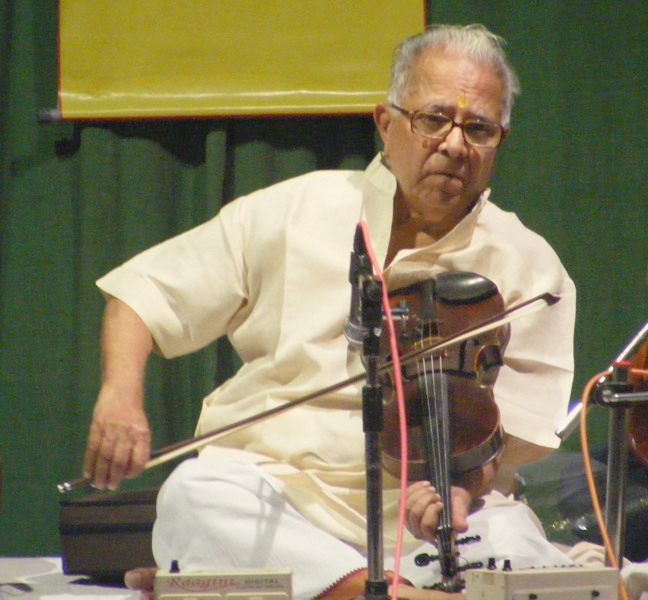
- Krishnan performing at the Film and Television Institute of India, Pune, on 19 January 2010

Background information
- Born: 6 October 1928; Tripunithura, Cochin, British India
- Died: 2 November 2020 (aged 92) Chennai
- Genre: Carnatic music
- Occupation: violinist
- Instrument: violin

Trippunithura Narayana Krishnan (6 October 1928 – 2 November 2020) was an Indian Carnatic music violinist. Along with Lalgudi Jayaraman and M. S. Gopalakrishnan he was considered part of the violin-trinity of Carnatic music. He was awarded the Madras Music Academy's Sangeetha Kalanidhi in 1980. He was also the recipient of the Padma Bhushan, India's third highest civilian honour, in 1992, and earlier, the Padma Shri, India's fourth highest civilian honour, in 1973.

== Early life ==
Krishnan was born on 6 October 1928, in Tripunithura, Kerala to A. Narayana Iyer and Ammini Ammal. He learnt music from his father and was 11 when he performed at his first violin concert in 1939 in Trivandrum. His father continued to teach him until his death. Recounting his early years, Krishnan mentioned that he would play the instrument continuously for over three hours at katcheris, or classical music performances, and they would "perform in temples, in landlords’ houses or at weddings."

He was mentored in his early years by Alleppy K.Parthasarathy a sisya of Ariyakudi Ramanuja Iyengar and later joined carnatic vocalist Semmangudi Srinivasa Iyer.

== Career ==
Krishnan started out as a violinist accompanying musicians Ariyakudi Ramanuja Iyengar, Chembai Vaidyanatha Bhagavatar, Musiri Subramania Iyer, Alathur Brothers, M. D. Ramanathan and Maharajapuram Viswanatha Iyer. He performed his first solo concert in Trivandrum in 1939, at the age of 11. In his early years, the Cochin royal family provided him with royal patronage.

Krishnan first arrived in Madras in 1942. His tutor, Semmangudi Srinivasa Iyer, placed him in the care of R. Aiyadurai, an industrialist, philanthropist and patron of Carnatic music. Aiyadurai and his wife Thangam Aiyadurai welcomed the young Krishnan in to their home as his own.

Along with Lalgudi Jayaraman and M. S. Gopalakrishnan he was considered a part of the violin-trinity of Carnatic music. Reviews of his performance called out the importance that he gave to expressional restraint. Reviewing one of his performances in 2004, The Hindu said that in his generation of musicians, he was one of the few instrumentalists who provided a nostalgic experience of a bygone era in the minds of his listeners. He was a regular performer during the annual Margazhi music season at the Madras Music Academy including a dedicated morning slot on Christmas Day. He travelled extensively on musical tours all over the world.

Krishnan taught music in the traditional Parampara setting and also in the more formal academic environments. Among his students were his daughter Viji Krishnan Natarajan, his son Sriram Krishnan, and Charumathi Raghuraman. He was a professor of Music at Chennai Music College and later went on to be the principal at the college. He was also the dean of the School of Music and Fine Arts at the University of Delhi. He had also served as the vice-chairman of the Sangeet Natak Akademi between 1991 and 1993.

== Awards and titles ==
Krishnan was awarded the Sangeet Natak Akademi Award in 1974 and was a recipient of the Sangeet Natak Akademi Fellowship from the academy in 2006. He received the Sangeetha Kalanidhi titular award in 1980 from the Madras Music Academy. He received the Sangeetha Kalasikhamani award in1999 from the Indian Fine arts Society, Chennai. He was also the Asthana Vidwan (transl. Court Scholar) at the Tirupathi Devastanam.

State honours:

- Padma Shri, India's fourth highest civilian honour (1973)
- Padma Bhushan, India's third highest civilian honour (1992)

Grammy's honoured him with 'In Memoriam' mention of International musicians in March 2021

== Personal life ==
Krishnan was married to Kamala Krishnan and had two children, Viji Krishnan Natarajan, and Sriram Krishnan. Both Viji Krishnan Natarajan and Sriram Krishnan are well-known violinists. His sister N. Rajam is a famous violin player in the Hindustani tradition. He died on 2 November 2020 at his house in Chennai.

== Discography ==
- Melodious Strings of the Indian Violin (1985)
- Maestros Choice (1991)
- Music is Music – Jugalbandi (with Ustad Amjad Ali Khan) (1991)
- The Carnatic Violin (2002)
- Parivaar (with N. Rajam) (2003)
- Sruti Sandhya (with T. S. Nandakumar)
- Sruti Sandhya 2 (with T. S. Nandakumar)
