= A. Kanyakumari =

Vidushi A. Kanyakumari
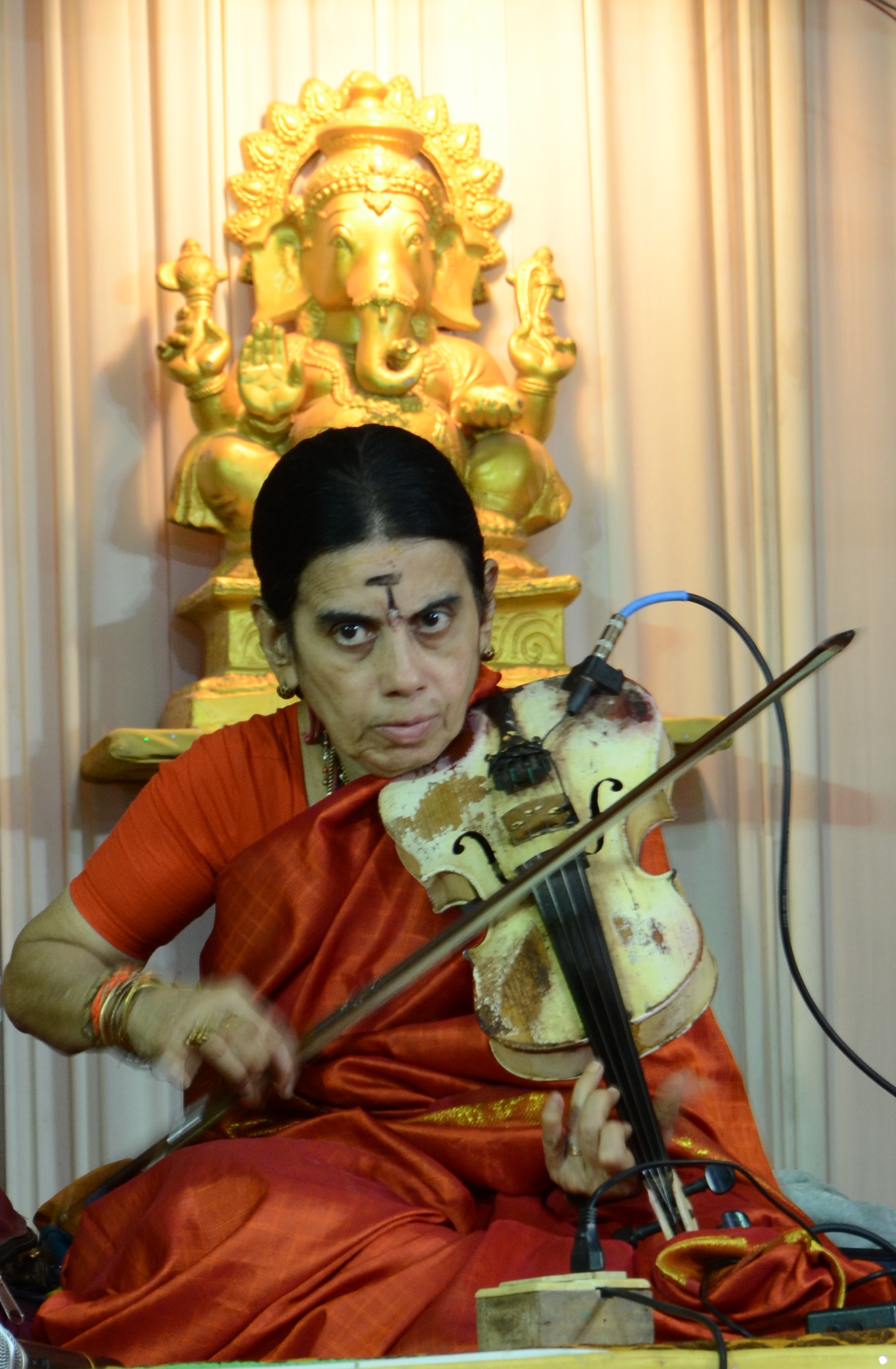

Background information
- Origin: Vizianagaram, Andhra Pradesh
- Genre: Carnatic music
- Instruments: Violin

Avasarala Kanyakumari is a violinist from South India who specializes in Carnatic music. She is the first woman violinist to receive the Sangita Kalanidhi award. Critics have noted aspects of her violin playing such as vocal-style phrasing and experimentation.

== Career ==
Kanyakumari is a native of Vizianagaram, Andhra Pradesh and has lived in Chennai for more than five decades. Her parents, Avasarala Ramarathnam and Smt. Jayalakshmi encouraged her to pursue music. She studied under Ivaturi Vijeswara Rao, M. Chandrasekaran and M. L. Vasanthakumari. Her playing incorporates a vocal-based approach known as the gayaki style. She was mentioned in the congressional record of the US on August 6, 2021, for offering free Carnatic violin instruction and acknowledging the influence of her teachers. She also often performs at SPIC MACAY Concerts throughout India. She has trained over 150 students and emphasises that students master the lyrics or sahityam too.

She is the first female violinist to create ragas. Recordings of her performances and compositions are available on platforms such as Spotify and YouTube. She maintains a website featuring instructional videos on Carnatic violin technique.

== Awards and honours ==
A. Kanyakumari was awarded the Sangeetha Kalanidhi award of the Madras Music Academy for the year 2016. She is the first female violinist to get the award. She has been the recipient of the following awards:

- Padma Shri by Government of India (2015)
- Sangita Kalanidhi from the Music Academy, Chennai (2016)
- Kalaimamani from Govt. of Tamil Nadu
- Ugadi Puraskar from Govt. of Andhra Pradesh
- Top Rank by A.I.R
- Honorary citizenship of the state of Maryland, U.S
- Sasvatanadavidushi (One who is adept in music that is divine) from TSN's Percussive Arts Centre Inc (TSNPAC), New Jersey in 2022
- TTK Award from the Music Academy, Chennai
- Asthana Vidhwan of TTD on honorarium for the period of five years, from 15 June, 2013.
- Asthana Vidushi of Sringeri Sarada Peetam, Ahobila Mutt and Avadhoota Peetam
- "Saptagiri sangeetha vidwanmani from Sri Tyagaraja Festival Committee of Tirupathi.
- Dhanurveena Praveena, a title bestowed on her by M.S. Subbulakshmi, commemorating Kanyakumari's 25 years in concerts
- Sangeeta Kala Nipuna, from the Mylapore Fine Arts Club, 2002
- Sangeet Natak Akademi Award, 2003
- Sangeetha Chudamani Award from Krishna Gana Sabha, 2012

She was selected for Limca Book of Records 2004 for her various achievements in music as a versatile woman violinist.
