= Sangita Kalanidhi =

Indian music award

Sangita Kalanidhi (transl. Treasure of Music and Art) is the title awarded annually to a Carnatic musician by the Madras Music Academy.

From 1929 to 1941, the award did not exist. The award was conceived in 1942 by Academy President K. V. Krishnaswami Iyer and on 1 January 1943 all musicians who had presided over the annual conferences between 1929 and 1942 were awarded the title. This included two or three past presidents of the academy who had died by then : Palamarneri Swaminatha Iyer (1931), probably Umayalpuram Swaminatha Iyer (1936) and Mangudi Chidambara Bhagavatar (1937); but no posthumous award has been presented since then. At times, 1946 is cited as the year of Umayalpuram Swaminatha Iyer's death, in which case he might have received the Sangita Kalanidhi in his lifetime.

== List of recipients ==
| Year | Recipient | Field |
|---|---|---|
| 2026 | Jayanthi Kumaresh | Veena player |
| 2025 | R. K. Shriramkumar | Violinist |
| 2024 | T. M. Krishna | Vocalist |
| 2023 | Bombay Jayashri | Vocalist |
| 2022 | G. J. R. Krishnan, Lalgudi Vijayalakshmi | Violinists |
| 2021 | Thiruvarur Bakthavathsalam | Mridangam player |
| 2020 | Neyveli Santhanagopalan | Vocalist, Composer |
| 2019 | S. Sowmya | Vocalist |
| 2018 | Aruna Sairam | Vocalist, Collaborator, Composer |
| 2017 | N. Ravikiran | Slide instrumentalist (Chitravina), Vocalist, Composer (Returned in 2024) (Note: In protest against the Academy's decision to confer T M Krishna with the award for the year 2024) |
| 2016 | A. Kanyakumari | Violinist |
| 2015 | Sanjay Subrahmanyan | Vocalist |
| 2014 | T. V. Gopalakrishnan | Vocalist / Mridangam player |
| 2013 | Sudha Ragunathan | Vocalist |
| 2012 | Trichur V. Ramachandran | Vocalist |
| 2011 | Trichy Sankaran | Mridangam player |
| 2010 | Bombay Sisters (C. Saroja and C. Lalitha) | Vocalists |
| 2009 | Valayapatti A. R. Subramaniam | Thavil player |
| 2008 | A. K. C. Natarajan | Clarinet player |
| 2007 | Palghat R. Raghu | Mridangam player |
| 2006 | T. N. Seshagopalan | Vocalist, Veena Player, Harikatha artiste |
| 2005 | M. Chandrasekaran | Violinist |
| 2004 | Vellore G. Ramabhadran | Mridangam player |
| 2003 | T. V. Sankaranarayanan | Vocalist |
| 2002 | Sikkil Sisters (Neela & Kunjumani) | Flute players |
| 2001 | Umayalpuram K. Sivaraman | Mridangam player |
| 2000 | Vedavalli | Vocalist |
| 1999 | T. K. Govindarao | Vocalist |
| 1998 | Sheik Chinna Moulana | Nadaswaram player |
| 1997 | M. S. Gopalakrishnan | Violinist |
| 1996 | N. Ramani | Flautist |
| 1995 | R. K. Srikantan | Vocalist |
| 1994 | T. K. Murthy | Mridangam player |
| 1993 | Mani Krishnaswami | Vocalist |
| 1992 | Thanjavur K. P. Sivanandam | Veena Player |
| 1991 | Nedunuri Krishnamurthy | Vocalist |
| 1990 | D. K. Jayaraman | Vocalist |
| 1989 | Maharajapuram Santhanam | Vocalist |
| 1988 | T. Viswanathan | Flautist |
| 1987 | B. Rajam Iyer | Vocalist |
| 1986 | K. V. Narayanaswamy | Vocalist |
| 1985 | S. Ramanathan | Vocalist / Composer |
| 1984 | Doreswamy Iyengar | Veena player |
| 1983 | Sripada Pinakapani | Vocalist |
| 1982 | Embar S. Vijayaraghavachariar | Harikatha exponent |
| 1981 | T. M. Thiagarajan | Vocalist |
| 1980 | T. N. Krishnan | Violin player |
| 1979 | K. S. Narayanaswamy | Veena player |
| 1978 | M. Balamuralikrishna | Vocalist, Composer, Poet, Violinist / Viola player, Mridangam artist, Kanjira player, Collaborator, Music Director and Actor |
| 1977 | M. L. Vasanthakumari | Vocalist |
| 1976 | T. Brinda | Vocalist |
| 1975 | Rallapalli Ananta Krishna Sharma | Composer / Vocalist |
| 1974 | No Award Given (Bicentennary of Muttuswami Dikshitar's birth) | N/A |
| 1973 | Balasaraswati | Bharatanatyam exponent |
| 1972 | Pichu Sambamoorthi | Musicologist |
| 1971 | Papanasam Sivan | Composer / Vocalist |
| 1970 | D. K. Pattammal | Vocalist |
| 1969 | Madurai Srirangam Iyengar | Vocalist |
| 1968 | M. S. Subbulakshmi | Vocalist |
| 1967 | Palghat Mani Iyer | Mridangam player |
| 1966 | No Award Given (Bicentennary of Tyagaraja's birth) | N/A |
| 1965 | Alathur Srinivasa Iyer | Vocalist |
| 1964 | Alathur Sivasubramanya Iyer | Vocalist |
| 1963 | Budaloor Krishnamurthy Shastri | Gottuvadhyam player |
| 1962 | Papa Venkataramaiah | Violinist |
| 1961 | Thiruvidaimarudur Veerusami Pillai | Nagaswaram player |
| 1960 | T. K. Jayarama Iyer | Violinist |
| 1959 | Madurai Mani Iyer | Vocalist |
| 1958 | G. N. Balasubramaniam | Vocalist / Composer |
| 1957 | Chowdiah | Violinist |
| 1956 | Thiruveezhimizhalai Subramanya Pillai | Nagaswaram Player |
| 1955 | Marungapuri Gopalakrishna Iyer | Violinist |
| 1954 | Chittoor Subramaniam Pillai | Vocalist |
| 1953 | Thirupampuram N. Swaminatha Pillai | Flautist |
| 1952 | Karaikudi Sambasiva Iyer | Veena player |
| 1951 | Chembai Vaidyanatha Bhagavatar | Vocalist |
| 1950 | Karur Chinnaswamy Iyer | Violinist |
| 1949 | Mudicondan Venkatarama Iyer | Vocalist |
| 1948 | Kumbakonam Rajamanickam Pillai | Violinist |
| 1947 | Semmangudi Srinivasa Iyer | Vocalist |
| 1946 | Maharajapuram Viswanatha Iyer | Vocalist |
| 1945 | No Award Given (Centenary of Tyagaraja's death) | N/A |
| 1944 | T. L. Venkatarama Iyer | Musicologist |
| 1943 | Palladam Sanjiva Rao | Flautist |
| 1942 | Mazhavarayanendal Subbarama Bhagavatar | Vocalist |
| 1941 | Dwaram Venkataswamy Naidu | Violin player |
| 1940 | Kallidaikurichi Vedanta Bhagavatar | Harikatha exponent / Composer |
| 1939 | Musiri Subramania Iyer | Vocalist |
| 1938 | Ariyakudi Ramanuja Iyengar | Vocalist |
| 1937 | Agaramangudi Chidambara Bhagavatar | Harikatha exponent |
| 1936 | Umayalapuram Swaminatha Iyer | Vocalist |
| 1935 | Mysore Vasudevachar | Composer / Vocalist |
| 1934 | T. S. Sabesha Iyer | Vocalist |
| 1933 | K. Ponniah Pillai | Composer / Pedagogue |
| 1932 | Tiger Varadachariar | Vocalist / Composer / Pedagogue |
| 1931 | Pazhamaneri Swaminatha Iyer | Vocalist / Violinist |
| 1930 | Muthiah Bhagavatar | Composer / Vocalist / Harikatha exponent / Gottuvadhyam player |
| 1929 | T. V. Subba Rao and M. S. Ramaswamy Iyer | Musicologists |
