= Alathur Venkatesa Iyer =

- Born: 1895
- Died: 1958 (aged 62–63)
- Genre: Carnatic
- Occupations: Musician, composer
- Instrument: Harmonium
- Formerly of: Alathur Brothers

Alathur Venkatesa Iyer (1895–1958) was a teacher of Carnatic music. Venkatesa Iyer practised Carnatic music in the style of the composer Tyagaraja. Venkatesa Iyer later developed a unique style of rendering kritis that is known as the "Alathur style". Venkatesa Iyer was also accomplished in playing the harmonium.

Iyer gave the world of Carnatic music its star duo of the 20th century, the Alathur Brothers. This duo consisted of his son, Sivasubramania Iyer, and another student, Srinivasa Iyer of Aangarai near Tanjore. Following the tradition set by their guru, the duo excelled in the authentic Carnatic music bringing together its technicalities to develop a taste for this patantara in the audience, both the experts and the laymen, alike. Venkatesa Iyer accompanied the Alathur Brothers on the harmonium in their first concert, which was held in 1928 at the Tyagaraja Aradhana at Tiruvaiyaru. Veteran mridangam exponent Pudukottai Dakshinamurthy Pillai accompanied them on the mridangam on that occasion.

Venkatesa Iyer was a Baktha of Saint Tyagaraja and popularized his krithis in large numbers.

Venkatesa Iyer was also a great admirer of Muthuswamy Dikshitar's compositions and he constructed a memorial for the great composer in Tiruvarur where Dikshitar's house had stood.

Venkatesa Iyer was instrumental in bringing out a large number of krithis of Maharaja Swathi Thirunal of Travancore. He shined and polished rare compositions of great composers like Meesu Krishna Iyer of the preceding century. He brought such compositions out on the concert platform through the Alathur Brothers.

Iyer's name is associated with acts such as Kancheepuram Naina Pillai, Konerirajapuram Vaidyantha Iyer, Pudukottai Dakshinamurthy Pillai and Pazhani Muthiah Pillai, all giants of an earlier era in Carnatic music. He sought out the nuances of their music and taught them to his students. The effect of such a training is evident in the music of the Alathur Brothers. A strict disciplinarian and an unflinching traditionalist, he taught students such Sarojini Sundaresan, Trichy J. Venkatraman, Chengelput Ranganathan, Clarinet A. K. C. Natarajan, who though numbering few, have in good stead been the torch bearers of the Alathur style.
