= Maharajapuram Viswanatha Iyer =

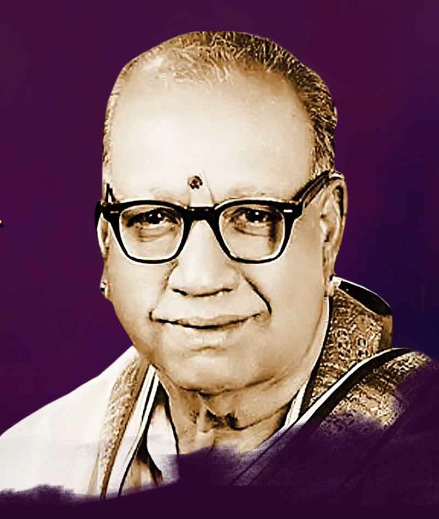
- Maharajapuram Viswanatha Iyer

Background information
- Born: 1896
- Origin: Chennai, India
- Died: 1970 (aged 74)
- Genres: Carnatic classical music
- Occupation: Classical music vocalist
- Years active: 1911–1966

Maharajapuram Viswanatha Iyer (Tamil: மகாராஜபுரம் விசுவநாதையர்; 1896–1970) was one of the great Indian Carnatic vocalists. He won several awards including Sangeetha Kalanidhi and Sangeetha Bhupathy.

== Early life and background ==
Viswanatha Iyer was born in Maharajapuram to Rama Iyer, a singer.

He was trained initially by Umayalpuram Swaminatha Iyer, a direct disciple of Maha Vaidyanatha Iyer. Maha Vaidyanatha Iyer had learnt from a direct disciple of Tyagaraja and thus Viswanatha Iyer represents the fifth generation of the Tyagaraja School.

Palghat Rama Bhagavathar was a fellow student under Umayalpuram Swaminatha Iyer.

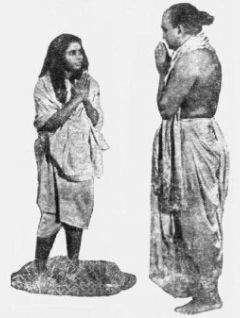
K. B. Sundarambal and Maharajapuram Viswanatha Iyer in Nandanar

== Singing career ==
A unique feature about his music was his great success in raga elaboration in great detail. The raga alapana of Mohanam was one of his specialties. His has been hailed as the success of 'kalpana sangeetha', music rich with imagination in raga elaboration and swara singing, a specialty of his.

His prominent disciples include Semmangudi Srinivasa Iyer, Mannargudi Sambasiva Bhagavatar, and his own son Maharajapuram Santhanam.

== Film career ==
He acted in a Tamil movie "Bhaktha Nandhanar" released on 1 January 1935 as the landlord Vedhiyar. K.B. Sundarambal acted as Nandhanar in this movie.
