= Chowdiah =

Indian composer and musician

Tirumakudalu Chowdiah

Background information
- Born: 1895; Thirumakudalu Narasipura, Kingdom of Mysore
- Died: 19 January 1967 (aged 71–72)
- Genre: Carnatic music
- Instrument: Violin
- Website: Official website

Thirumakudalu Chowdiah (1895 – 19 January 1967), known popularly as Pitil Chowdiah, was a violinist from India in the Carnatic classical tradition. A disciple of vocalist Bidaram Krishnappa, he trained in the Mysore royal court, and went on to become one of the most sought-after accompanists of his era. He later emerged as a renowned soloist, particularly in the Mysore region during pre-independence India. In 1939, he was appointed Asthana Vidwan (court musician) of the royal court by the Maharaja of Mysore Krishna Raja Wadiyar IV.

To overcome the limitations of sound projection in large concert halls before the advent of electronic amplification, Chowdiah modified the traditional four-string violin by adding three extra strings, creating a distinctive seven-stringed violin that became his signature instrument. He is credited with more than 50 compositions in multiple languages. In 1957, he was honoured with the Sangita Kalanidhi by the Madras Music Academy, one of the highest honors in Carnatic music, and the Sangeet Natak Akademi Award, the highest Indian recognition for a performing artist. In 1958, he was nominated to the Mysore Legislative Council, the upper house of the state legislature of Karnataka. Chowdiah died in 1967 at the age of 72. The Kannada film actor Ambareesh was his grand-nephew.

== Early years ==
Chowdiah was born in 1895 in Thirumakudalu Narasipura village near Mysuru, in the erstwhile Kingdom of Mysore to Sundaramma and Agastye. The village is located at the confluence of the rivers Kaveri and Kabani. When Chowdiah was 12, he was slapped by vocalist Bidaram Krishnappa who was in the audience after Chowdiah slipped into wrong notes while playing the violin. Subsequently, he trained with Krishnappa in the Mysore royal court from 1910 to 1918. Chowdiah also trained as a vocalist. His biographer noted, "No mistake was spared; the punishment being long hours of practice. This is what helped him adopt a bold and adventurous technique and become a master violinist."

== Career ==
Chowdiah had his first public performance at the age of 17. He was asked to perform after the violinist intended failed to show up. A turning point in Chowdiah's career came in 1920 when he accompanied Ariyakudi Ramanuja Iyengar at a concert in Madras (now Chennai). Following this, he became a regular accompanist for many leading vocalists. Until 1926, he would practice for 14 to 16 hours a day, while also often accompanying Krishnappa in concerts. That year marked the beginning of his solo concert career.

Chowdiah played the four-stringed violin during his formative years. In 1927, when he was an accompanying violinist, he noted that the audience seated in the back rows during the performances were unable to clearly hear the recitals due to absence of audio amplifiers at the time. He added three strings to overcome this and began playing with a seven-string violin. He fitted the three parallel strings fitted close to the second, third and fourth strings, and tuned to the respective lower octaves. He employed the staccato technique in his violin playing, wherein notes were rendered in a discontinuous or abruptly detached manner. He achieved the effect either by bringing the bow to a stop before initiating the next note or by bouncing or springing the bow lightly against the string.

However, Chowdiah's seven-string violin was seen by many critics and performers as an attempt at self-promotion. Another violinist G. N. Balasubramaniam mocked him calling him "Soundiah", implying that though the two reconciled later and performed together. C. S. Iyer, brother of physicist C. V. Raman, was a performer and critic, who said in 1942 that the seven-stringed violin should be consigned to the depths of the Bay of Bengal. An enraged Chowdiah got up and ran towards the dais brandishing his violin bow. He was restrained from bodily-harming Iyer. In 1947, Chowdiah came with a 12-stringed violin to play but he was prevailed upon by Semmangudi Srinivasa Iyer who was that year's conference president not to go ahead with the demonstration. All major practitioners continue to use the traditional four-stringed violin only. However, V. Sethuramiah, Chowdiah's disciple, mostly used seven-stringed violin. In 1939, Chowdiah was appointed the Asthana Vidwan (court musician) of the Mysore royal court by Krishna Raja Wadiyar IV. In 1943, he appeared in a dual role in the Kannada-language film, Vani. He also produced the film and composed its music.

With his violin, Chowdiah accompanied veteran musicians such as Chembai, Ariyakudi Ramanuja Iyengar, Alathur Brothers, Balasubramaniam, Musiri Subramania Iyer, Semmangudi Srinivasa Iyer, Madurai Mani Iyer with percussionists such as V. Dakshinamoorthy, Palghat Mani Iyer and Palani Subramaniam Pillai on stage. As a soloist, he would then go on to become popular following his performances across India. He is credited with having made more than 50 compositions in Kannada, Telugu and Sanskrit. They were mainly kritis and tillanas, and he composed them under the pen name Trimakuta. In 1952, he started the Ayyanar College of Music in Bangalore with the help of K. Puttu Rao, a Mysore-based music enthusiast.

== Personal life ==
Chowdiah first married Ramamma, who died one year after marriage. Five years later, Chowdiah to Nanjamma and had three daughters with her. He was close friends with historian and polyglot S. Srikanta Sastri.

Chowdiah was known for his fondness for cars. He owned and drove a variety of cars, including models such as the Austin, Ford, Morris Minor, Ford Prefect, Chevrolet and Plymouth. Chowdiah died on 19 January 1967 at the age of 72.

== Legacy ==
The Chowdiah Memorial Hall in Bangalore was built in Chowdiah's memory in 1980. It resembles a violin in shape and structure. It is the only memorial to exist for a musician of any instrument in India. In 1994, the T. Chowdiah Memorial Award was instituted in his name, and is awarded annually to instrumentalists. The first recipient was Bismillah Khan (shehnai). The T. Chowdiah Road in Bangalore is named after him. Chowdiah's biographer and vocalist, S. Krishnamurthy, wrote of Chowdiah: "His exemplary artistry and endearing simplicity brought him close to all the top-notch vidwans [he performed with]. Chowdiah's initiative helped many musicians perform at the Darbar Hall of the Mysore Palace, where he was the Asthana Vidwan."

In 2020, the Indian Music Experience Museum and the Shankar Mahadevan Academy got together to create a digital archive of Chowdiah's compositions. The Mysore T Chowdiah Project, and creation of the website chowdiah.com, was headed by vocalist Mansi Prasad. The online archive featuring video recordings Chowdiah's compositions, along with the notations, and biography, photographs, articles and blogs on his life, was launched in September that year. Two books, both in Kannada, have been written on Chowdiah's compositions. The first, a publication of the University of Mysore, edited by Chowdiah's prime disciple V. Ramaratnam, and the second, by another disciple, Anasuya Kulkarni. Another biography titled Kala Kaustubha, written by Padmavathi Narasimhan, was released in 2023.

== Filmography ==
- Vani (1943) (producer, actor, music director)

== Awards and honours ==
- 1947: Sangeeta Ratna by the Maharaja of Mysore
- 1957: Sangita Kalanidhi by the Madras Music Academy
- 1957: Sangeet Natak Akademi Award
- 1958: Sangeeta Kalasikhamani by the Indian Fine Arts Society
- 1959: Ganakala Sindhu at the Mysore Sangeetha Sammelan
- 1960: Sangeetha Ratnakara by the Sringeri Math

== See also ==
- List of Carnatic composers
