= List of Indian violinists =

There are two styles of violin playing in India: the Carnatic and the Hindustani. Carnatic violinists such as Malaikkottai Govindaswamy Pillai, Tirukkodikaval Krishna Iyer and Dwaram Venkataswamy Naidu performed concerts as early as 1900. Indian violinists today such as Manoj George, L. Shankar, Fayiz Muhammed and Balabhaskar have successfully adapted the Western music style of playing the violin and have been performing concerts outside of India. Violinists such as N. Rajam and Sangeeta Shankar are highly accomplished international performers in the Hindustani style. Violinists such as T.N. Krishnan, A. Kanyakumari, H.K. Venkatram and Mysore brothers have remained Carnatic classical violinists and have yet been able to reach out to audiences outside of India. Also, artists such as Jyotsna Srikanth, L. Subramaniam, Ambi Subramaniam, Fayiz Muhammed, and Roopa Revathi have satisfactorily managed to perform both Carnatic and Western music on the violin.

The following is a list of famous Indian violinists.

== List ==
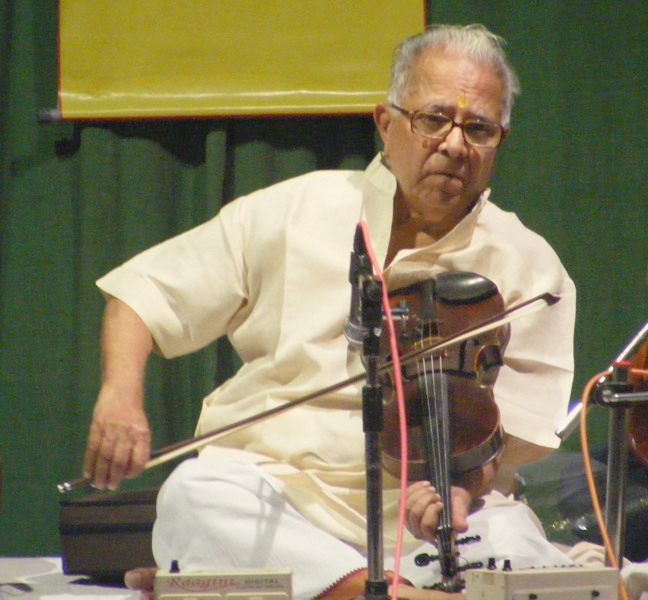
T. N. Krishnan

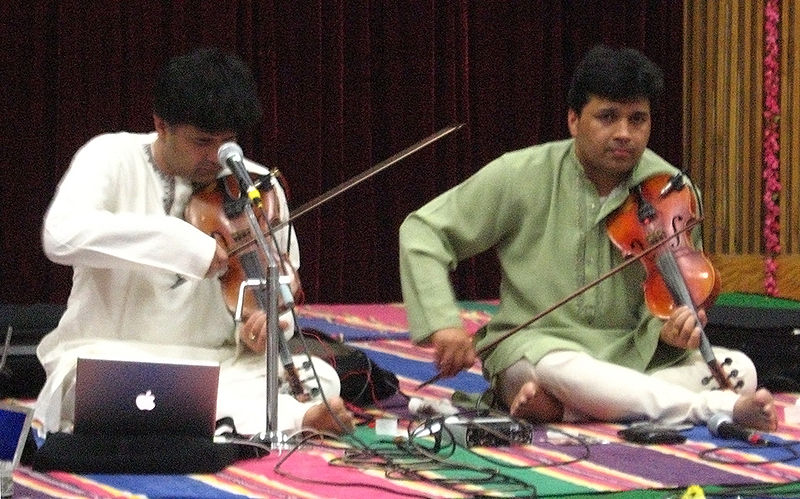
Ganesh and Kumaresh

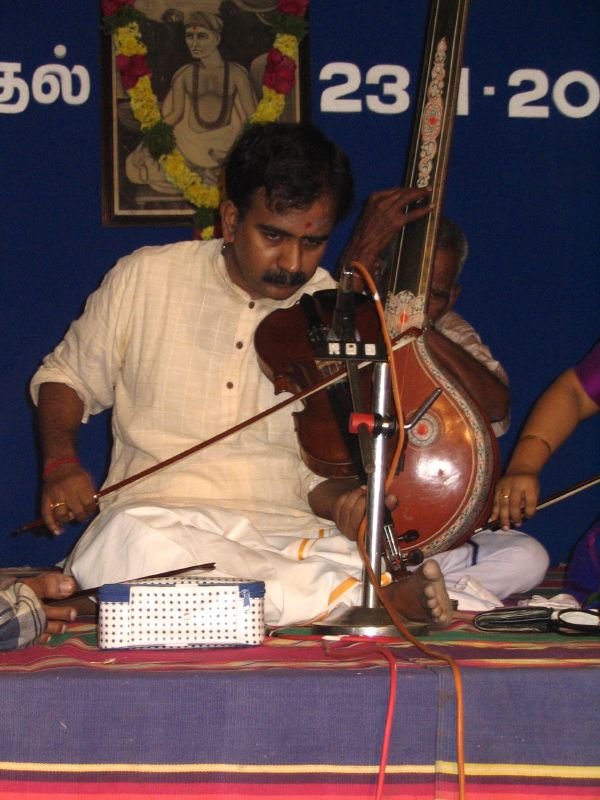
G.J.R. Krishnan

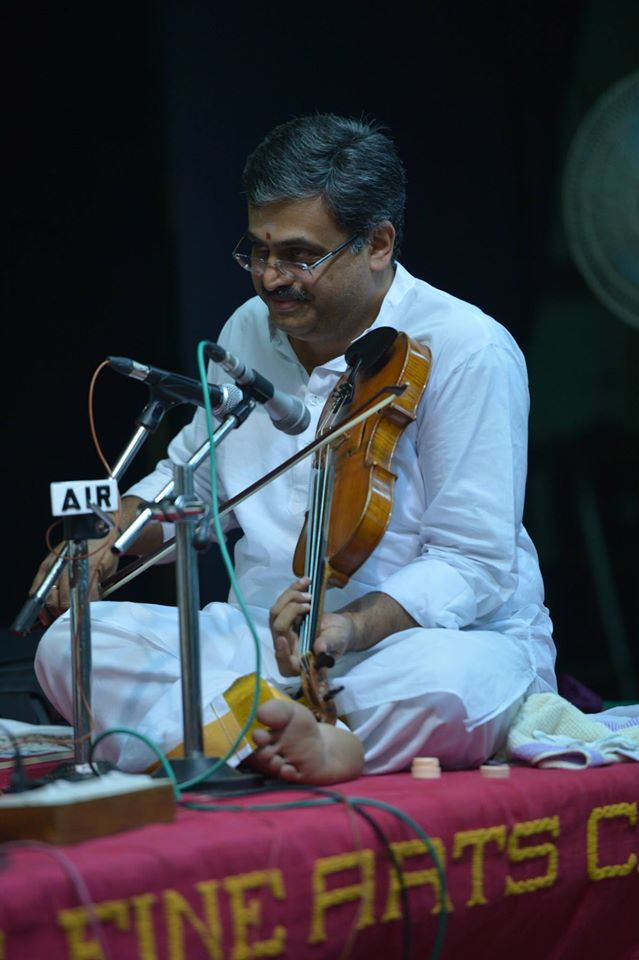
H.K. Venkatram

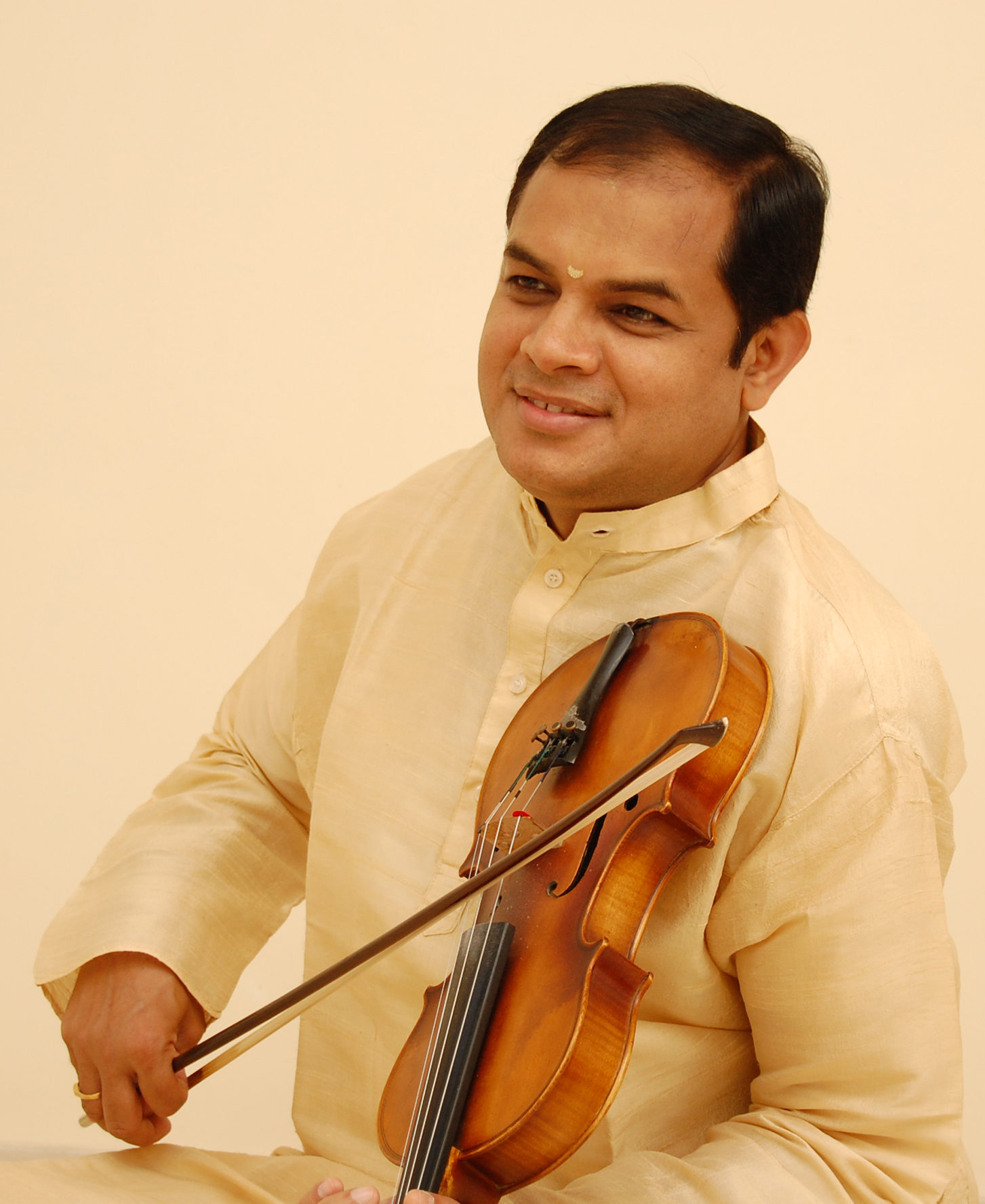
Vittal Ramamurthy

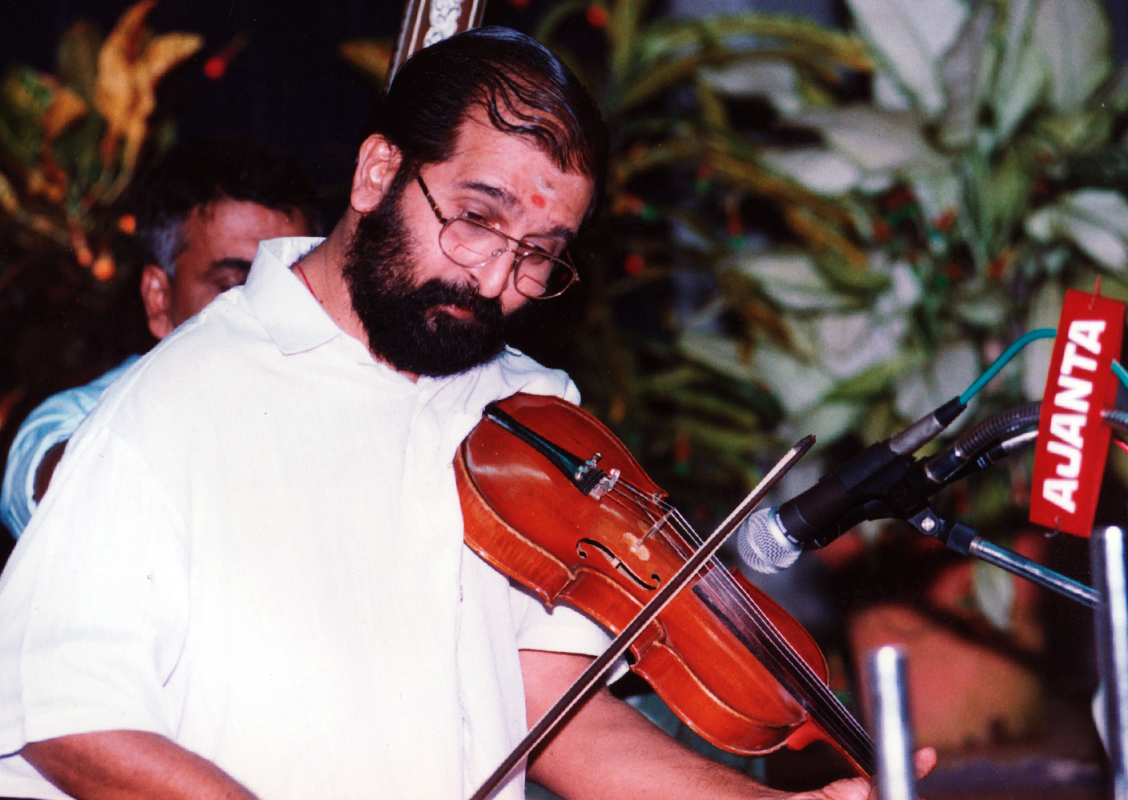
B. Sasikumar

| Violinist | Born | Died | Style | Currently active | Ref. |
|---|---|---|---|---|---|
| Abhijith P. S. Nair | 1991 | | carnatic and jazz fusion | Yes | |
| Akkarai Subbalakshmi | 1983 | | Carnatic | | |
| Ambi Subramaniam | 1991 | | Carnatic and Western | Yes | |
| Arrol Carelli | 1985 | | Carnatic and Western | Yes | |
| B. Sasikumar | 1949 | | Carnatic | Yes | |
| Balabhaskar | 1978 | 2018 | Carnatic and Western fusion | No | |
| Delhi P. Sunder Rajan | 1969 | | Carnatic | Yes | |
| Dwaram Bhavanarayana Rao | 1924 | 2000 | Carnatic | No | |
| Dwaram Venkataswamy Naidu | 1893 | 1964 | Carnatic | No | |
| Embar Kannan | 1975 | | Carnatic | Yes | |
| Fayiz Muhammed | 1997 | | Carnatic and Western | Yes | |
| Gagan Chandra Chatterjee | 1890 | 1949 | Hindustani | No | |
| Ganesh and Kumaresh | 1964 | | Carnatic | Yes | |
| Gingger Shankar | - | | Western | Yes | |
| H. K. Narasimha Murthy | - | | Carnatic | Yes | |
| H. K. Venkatram | 1965 | | Carnatic | Yes | |
| Joi Srivastava | 1930 | 2003 | Hindustani | No | |
| Jyotsna Srikanth | - | | Carnatic and Western | Yes | |
| Kala Ramnath | 1967 | | Hindustani | Yes | |
| Kunnakudi Vaidyanathan | 1935 | 2008 | Carnatic | No | |
| L. Athira Krishna | - | | Carnatic and Western | Yes | |
| L. Shankar | 1950 | | Carnatic and Hindustani | Yes | |
| L. Subramaniam | 1947 | | Carnatic and Western | Yes | |
| L. Vaidyanathan | 1942 | 2007 | Carnatic | No | |
| Lalgudi G Jayaraman | 1930 | 2013 | Carnatic | No | |
| Lalgudi Vijayalakshmi | 1963 | | Carnatic | Yes | |
| M. Chandrasekaran | 1938 | | Carnatic | Yes | |
| M. Narmadha | - | | Carnatic and Hindustani | Yes | |
| M. S. Gopalakrishnan | 1931 | 2013 | Carnatic | No | |
| Manoj George | 1971 | | Indian, Western, world fusion | Yes | |
| Mayavaram V. R. Govindaraja Pillai | 1912 | 1979 | Carnatic | No | |
| Mysore brothers – Mysore Nagaraj and Mysore Manjunath | - | | Carnatic | Yes | |
| Mysore Tirumakoodalu Chowdiah | 1895 | 1967 | Carnatic | No | |
| N. Rajam | 1938 | | Hindustani | Yes | |
| Nandini Muthuswamy | - | | Carnatic and Western | Yes | |
| Nandini Shankar | 1993 | | Hindustani | Yes | |
| Nedumangad Sivanandan | 1935 | | Carnatic | Yes | |
| R. K. Shriramkumar | 1966 | | Carnatic | Yes | |
| R. R. Keshavamurthy | 1913 | 2006 | Carnatic | No | |
| Ragini Shankar | - | | Hindustani | Yes | |
| Roopa Revathi | 1984 | | Carnatic and Western | Yes | |
| Sabareesh Prabhaker | 1989 | | Western | Yes | |
| Sangeeta Shankar | 1965 | | Hindustani | Yes | |
| Sharat Chandra Srivastava | 1971 | | Hindustani | Yes | |
| Charumathi Raghuraman | - | | Carnatic | Yes | |
| Sikkil R. Bhaskaran | 1936 | | Carnatic | Yes | |
| Sunita Bhuyan | 1970 | | Indian, world folk, fusion | Yes | |
| T. N. Krishnan | 1928 | 2020 | Carnatic | No | |
| Tirukkodikaval Krishna Iyer | 1857 | 1913 | Carnatic | No | |
| V. Lakshminarayana | 1911 | 1990 | Carnatic | No | |
| V. G. Jog | 1922 | 2004 | Hindustani | No | |
| V. V. Ravi | - | | Carnatic | Yes | |
| Vittal Ramamurthy | - | | Carnatic | Yes | |
