= Rudrapatnam Brothers =

Duo of Indian musicians

- Origin: Arkalgud, Karnataka, India
- Genres: Carnatic, Classical
- Years active: 1956 – present
- Members: Shri R.N. Thyagarajan & Shri R.N. Tharanathan

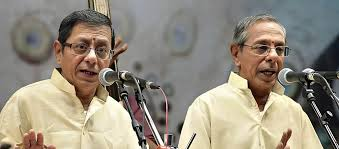

The Rudrapatnam Brothers are an Indian Carnatic vocal duo, consisting of brothers R. N. Thyagarajan and Dr. R. N. Tharanathan. The brothers come from a family of musicians from Rudrapatna village off the Kaveri banks in Arkalgud Thaluk of Hassan district in the southwest Indian state of Karnataka. Vocalist Tiger Varadachariar, on seeing the musical atmosphere there, once claimed that "Rudrapatnam is the Thanjavur of Karnataka". Music, Veda adhyayana, and studying Sanskrit were integral parts of their family tradition.

In 2018, they were honored as the first Carnatic Vocal duo to receive the "Padma Sri," the third-highest civilian award in India, from the Government of India.

Their musical journey spans more than sixty years with thousands of concerts and with hundreds of sishyas around the globe.

== Early life and career ==
They are grandsons of R. K. Krishna Sastry, a musician, Harikatha exponent, playwright and a Sanskrit and Kannada scholar. They are sons of R. K. Narayana Swamy, a disciple of Musiri Subramania Iyer, the doyen of Carnatic music. Their uncles are R. K. Venkatarama Sastry, R. K. Ramanathan and Sangita Kalanidhi Padma Bhushan Dr. R. K. Srikantan. Ace violinist Sangita Kalanidhi R. K. Shriramkumar is the nephew of the duo.

They were initiated into Carnatic music and trained by their father and Sastry, the famous violinist and disciple of Sangita Kalanidhi Mysore T. Chowdiah.

== Education ==
Thyagarajan earned a M.Sc. in mathematics and worked as a lecturer in mathematics for several years before joining All India Radio in 1976. He was the Assistant Director, Chennai Doordarshan Kendra and retired as Deputy Director, Doordarshan Kendra, Bangalore in 2003.

Tharanathan earned a M.Sc. and Ph.D. in organic chemistry and was a Chemistry Lecturer and retired as Additional Director, Department of Biochemistry and Nutrition in Central Food Technological Research Institute (C.F.T.R.I), Mysore. He was a visiting professor and Fellow at Max Planck Society, Germany and a recipient of Alexander Von Humboldt Fellowship. He has visited Germany several times and worked on research projects.

== Musical career ==
One review saw the brothers as deeply influenced by their predecessors, describing their music as adhering to the tradition of Carnatic music. They claim influences from Sri Semmangudi Srinivasa Iyer, Sri G.N.Balasubramaniam (GNB), Sri Ramnad Krishnan and Sri Tanjavur S Kalyanaraman.

They claim the tradition of Saint Thyagaraja Swamy Sishya Parampara in more than one way. Musiri, their guru’s guru belongs to the sishya lineage of Manambuchaavadi Venkatasubbayyar. Sastry was a sishya of Veena Subbanna who was part of the Walajapet sishya parampara and sishya of Mysore Sadasiva Rao.

They emphasize the music of Nayaki, Varali, Begada, Mukhari, Sahana, Madhyamavathi and Thodi.

=== Concerts ===
They began their concert career in 1956 and since then performed regularly around the world. They have given performances across India accompanied by artists such as Lalgudi Jayaraman, M. S. Gopalakrishnan, V.V. Subramanyam, M. Chandrasekaran, Ramanathapuram C. S. Murugabhoopathy, T. K. Murthy, Palghat R. Raghu, Umayalpuram K. Sivaraman, Vellore Ramabhadran, Karaikudi Mani, V. Kamalakar Rao, Trichy Sankaran, Srimushnam V. Raja Rao, K.S. Manjunathan, G. Harishankar and T. H. Vinayakaram.

In 2016, the Rudrapatnam Brothers received the coveted Sangeet Natak Academy Award from the honourable President of India Shri Pranab Mukherjee. In 2017, the brothers received prestigious "Sangita Kala Acharya" Award from the Madras Music Academy.

== Awards ==
Year	Title	Given by
1961, 1963, 1964 & 1965	AIR Music Competitions in Carnatic classical and Light classical	Dr. S. Radhakrishnan, the then president of India. The Brothers won the prizes individually in consecutive years in Classical and Light Music categories.
1979	Gana Sudhakara	Karnataka Sangeetha Nrithya Academy
1992	-	Karnataka State Rajyotsava Award
1995	Ganakala Thilaka	Carnatic Music Society, Goa
1999	Musiri Subramanya Iyer	Neraval Singing, Music Academy, Chennai
1999	Felicitations	Bharat Cultural Integration Committee, Chennai
2000	T.S.Sabhesh Iyer and K.Ponnaiah Pillai	Music Academy, Chennai
2002	Felicitations	Maharajapuram Santhanam Foundation, Chennai
2003	Sangeetha Kala Tapaswi	Vaggeyakara Aradhanotsava Samithi, Mysore
2003	Karnataka Kalashree	Karanataka Sangeetha Nrithya Academy, Bengaluru
2005	Thyagaraja Prashasti	Bengaluru Nagarathnamma Trust
2005	Sangeetha Vidhyanidhi	President(s) of the 12th Music Conference, JSS Sangeetha Sabha
2006	Artists of the Year	Bengaluru Gayana Samaja
2006	Gayaka Kala Bhooshana	Shri Thyagaraja Gana Sabha Trust, Bengaluru
2007	Swaralaya Shrunga	Suswaralya College of Music, Bengaluru
2008	Swaramurthy V.N.Rao Memorial National Award	Bengaluru
2008	Asthana Vidwan	Shri Kanchi Kamakoti Peetham
2011	Kalajyothi	Nadajyothi Shri Thyagaraja Bajana Sabha, Bengaluru
2014	Gana Varidhi	M A Narasimhachar Music Foundation, Bengaluru
2015	Sangeet Natak Academy Award	Central Sangeet Natak Academy, New Delhi
2016	Sangeetha Kala Acharya Award	Madras Music Academy, Chennai
2017	Sangeetha Kala Rathna Award	Bengaluru Gayana Samaja, Bengaluru
2018	Padma Sri	Government of India
