= Concerts of Chembai =

Series of performances by Chembai (1904–1927)

The Concerts of Chembai were the performances orchestrated by Chembai Vaidyanatha Bhagavatar (1896–1974), an Indian Carnatic music vocalist. Vaidyanatha Bhagavatar performed numerous concerts throughout his career, often accompanied by prominent musicians of the era.

== Arangetram and first paid concerts (1904) ==
Chembai Vaidyanatha Bhagavatar debuted in 1904 with a two-hour concert alongside his brother, Subramanian. In 1905, the brothers held their first paid concert at a temple festival in Ottapalam, a town in the Palakkad district of Kerala. At a later concert at Kandallur Parthasarathy Temple, Anantha Bhagavatar played the violin, and Chokkanathapuram Ayya Bhagavatar played the mridangam.

== Vaikom and Guruvayur performances (1907) ==
During the brothers' early career, they performed a concert at the temple festival in Vaikom, known for its annual musical performances. At this concert, their father played the violin. The brothers received early musical training from their father. Chembai sang at the Vaikom festival every year thereafter. After the Vaikom concert in 1907, Anantha Bhagavatar took the brothers to Guruvayur, another temple town where they performed again. Much like Vaikom, Guruvayur also became a regular part of Chembai's annual concert schedule.

== Early career (1909–1915) ==
Kaliakudi Natesa Sastri of Tiruvarur, an exponent of Harikatha (musical discourse), visited Chembai village in 1909. Anantha Bhagavatar and his family attended the programs, and the boys joined Sastri's troupe. Their concert took place in Thanjavur district, at a guru puja festival, where Natesa Sastri gave a discourse. Pudukkottai Dakshinamurthy Pillai, an exponent of the mridangam and kanjira, heard the boys for the first time. During their time with Natesa Sastri, they performed in various places and listened to performances by musicians such as Namakkal Narasimha Iyengar, Kallidaikurichi Vedanta Bhagavathar, Ramanathapuram Srinivasa Iyengar, Konerirajapuram Vaidyanatha Iyer, Harikesanallur Muthiah Bhagavatar, Madurai Pushpavanam, Tirukodikaval Krishna Iyer, Malaikkottai Govindaswamy Pillai, and Pudukkottai Dakshinamurthy Pillai whenever possible. These experiences furthered the brothers' training, and after a year they returned to Chembai in 1910 with additional experience as musicians.

Chembai was invited to sing at a wedding for the family of Jnanaprakasa Mudaliar in Pondicherry. Up to this point, the brothers had performed concerts mainly in and around Chembai. They had travelled to several places with Natesa Sastrigal and sung at his discourses, but these mini-concerts closely resembled interludes. The performance in Pondicherry increased Chembai's visibility and led to further concert engagements.

== Karur concert (1913) ==
Pethachi Chettiar, a patron of the arts and artists, lived in Karur near Trichy. He organized a festival featuring music concerts by leading musicians. Harikesanallur Muthiah Bhagavatar, a prominent musician and composer (vaggeyakara), was in charge of the festival arrangements. Chembai wanted to attend this music festival, so he and his brother traveled to Karur, where he met Muthiah Bhagavatar and expressed his desire to perform at the festival. But Muthiah Bhagavatar explained that the performance schedule had already been finalized and could not be changed.

After the scheduled violin accompanist for a jalatarangam concert failed to arrive, Chembai performed as a substitute for the artist and was paid for his contribution. Muthiah Bhagavatar and Pethachi Chettiar promised him a performance slot for the following day, where Chembai sang to the audience's appreciation.

== Ernakulam concert (1915) ==
Chembai secured a similar opportunity in 1915, when T. A. Duraiswami Iyer, a prominent citizen of Ernakulam, conducted an annual Tyagaraja festival, which attracted notable performers and listeners. Chembai went to Ernakulam and asked Duraiswami Iyer for a chance to sing, to which Duraiswami Iyer agreed. Chembai sang for the allotted time and was about to leave when the audience requested one more song, with which he ended the concert. Here, he befriended T.G. Krishna Iyer (Duraiswami Iyer's nephew), whose compositions he later set to classical music and popularized.

== Thiruvavaduthurai concert (1915) ==
Chembai had heard about "Sreelasree" Ambalavana Desikar (pontiff of the Tiruvavaduturai matha) and his knowledge of music. He wanted to sing before him and proceeded to Tiruvavaduthurai with his brother. At Desikar's suggestion, Chembai rendered in viruttam form the verse Kanduka madakkariyai vasamai nadattalam. Desikar prompted Chembai about the ragas he should sing, and Chembai responded. Desikar then ordered that a katcheri (concert) by Chembai be held the next day. The concert featured Azhagianambi Pillai on the mridangam.

== Palakkad Ramanavami concert (1916) ==
An important moment in Chembai's early career was his concert at the Ramanavami festival in Palakkad in 1916. Pudukkotai Dakshinamurthy Pillai attended the concert and, after the festival, returned to Trichy to meet the violinist Govindaswamy Pillai. He shared his impressions of Chembai's music, leading to the arrangement of a concert by Vaidyanatha Bhagavatar in Trichy. Govindaswamy Pillai played the violin while Dakshinamurthy Pillai accompanied on the mridangam. Following this concert, Vaidyanatha Bhagavatar performed at additional venues, often accompanied by Govindaswamy Pillai and Dakshinamurthy Pillai.

== First concert in Madras (1918) ==
Chembai's first concert in Madras took place in 1918 at the Triplcane Sangeeta Sabha and featured Govindaswamy Pillai on the violin, Azhagunambi Pillai on the mridangam, and Dakshinamurthy Pillai on the kanjira.

== First concert with Chowdiah and Palghat Mani Iyer (1924) ==
T. Chowdiah was a violinist who invented the seven-stringed violin and became popular playing it. Chembai befriended him after meeting at a friend's house in 1924. Chembai performed with Chowdiah in the Jagannatha Bhakta Sabha. and it was at this concert that Chembai introduced young Palghat Mani Iyer to an audience. At a similar concert in 1926, he also introduced Palani Subramaniam Pillai, a disciple of Pudukkottai Dakshinamurthi Pillai.

== Inaugural performance at Madras Music Academy (1927) ==
The 1927 meeting of the Indian National Congress was held in Madras. Music concerts were arranged, and it was decided to establish an institution to promote classical music in South India. Thus, the Madras Music Academy was founded, and Chembai was invited to give one of the inaugural concerts.

== Reception ==
Palghat Anantharama Bhagavatar attended the brothers' 1911 concert in Sekharipuram. In later accounts, he commented on Vaidyanatha Bhagavatar's vocal ability and his potential for a professional career. Scholars such as Susanne K. Langer have noted the religious and cultural significance of these performances.

== See also ==
- Chembai Vaidyanatha Bhagavatar
- Carnatic Music
- South India
- Kerala
- Indian Classical Music
