= Parur Sundaram Iyer =

Indian violin player (1891–1974)

- Born: 1891; Kerala, India
- Died: 1974 (aged 82–83)
- Genres: Carnatic music, Hindustani classical music
- Occupation: Violinist
- Instrument: Violin

Parur Sundaram Iyer (1891–1974) was an Indian violinist from Kerala who had mastered both the streams of Indian Classical Music, his native Carnatic style and Hindustani.

Iyer received the Kerala Sangeetha Nataka Akademi Award in 1972.

== Playing Style ==
Iyer developed a style of playing which is known as Parur Bani, named after his native place named Parur. Though he was from the place named Parur in the Indian state of Kerala, and thus grew up in the milieu of Carnatic music, he traveled to Mumbai in 1909 to learn Hindustani Sangeet from Pandit V D Paluskar. He served as a faculty member at Gandharva Maha Vidyalaya, Mumbai. He returned to Chennai in 1922. He proceeded to develop a new style which added some elements of Hindustani music to Carnatic violin playing.

Iyer won the admiration of fellow musicians like Harikesanallur Muttiah Bhagavadar and Chembai Vaidyanata Bhagavadar. Sundaram Iyer was fond of Abdul Karim Khan saab’s music and used to organize Chamber concerts at his home.

== Family of musicians ==
Iyer and his wife Bhageerathi Ammal had eight children. Their eldest daughter, S Sitalakshmi (b 1920), played violin in an orchestra as a child artist. Sundaram Iyer's two sons M. S. Anantharaman (1924–2018, the fourth child) and M. S. Gopalakrishnan, a.k.a. MSG, (1931–2013, the eight and youngest child) became major violin players and popularized Parur Bani. They played violin recitals, as well as offered accompaniment to many major artistes of the day. Anantaraman's two sons, M.A. Sundareshan and M.A. Krishnaswamy, and MSG's daughter M. Narmadha carry the family legacy now. MSG, as the younger of the violin playing brothers was called, was awarded Sangeetha Kalanidhi and Padma Bhushan titles.

Parur Sundaram Iyer died in December 1974.
