= Sindhu Bhairavi =

Sindhu Bhairavi may refer to:

- Sindhu Bhairavi (raga), a raga (mode) in Carnatic music (South Indian classical music)
- Sindhu Bhairavi (film), a 1985 Indian film
  - Sindhu Bhairavi (soundtrack), its soundtrack by Ilaiyaraaja
