= Sindhu Bhairavi (soundtrack) =

Soundtrack album by Ilaiyaraaja
- Released: 1985
- Genre: Feature film soundtrack
- Language: Tamil
- Label: Echo
- Producer: Ilaiyaraaja

Sindhu Bhairavi is the soundtrack to the 1985 Tamil-language musical drama film of the same name directed by K. Balachander. The film featured nine songs composed by Ilaiyaraaja with lyrics written by Vairamuthu and Vaali. The soundtrack consists of classical music compositions, where most of the songs are set in Carnatic ragas; it ranges from melody to folk. Sindhu Bhairavi has been regarded as one of Ilaiyaraaja's best works in his career, for which he won the National Film Award for Best Music Direction.

== Background ==
Though Ilaiyaraaja had composed for several films under Balachander's Kavithalayaa Productions beginning with Netrikkan (1981), Sindhu Bhairavi is his maiden collaboration with Balachander as director. After previous associations with M. S. Viswanathan, Balachander wanted a different composer for the film, so he approached Ilaiyaraaja after seeking permission from Viswanathan. K. J. Yesudas and K. S. Chithra lent their voice for the characters J. K. Balaganapathi (Sivakumar) and Sindhu (Suhasini), the former performed most of the songs in the film.

Many of the songs are set in Carnatic ragas; "Naan Oru Sindhu" is in Sindhu Bhairavi, "Kalaivaniye" in Kalyani, "Poomaalai" in Kanada, "Paadariyen" in Saramati, "Aanantha Nadanam" in Rathipatipriya, and the dappankuthu number "Thanni Thotti Thedi Vantha" in Kapi. "Paadariyen" was described by Balachander as a "folk song with a blend of Carnatic music". During his first meeting with Ilaiyaraaja, he started working on the tune to which he Ilaiyaraaja asked for a day's time and completed the tune within the following day. The song describes the politics of music from the perspective of a certain population. Ilaiyaraaja composed "Kalaivaniye" entirely in Arohana without Avarohana, which he opines never happened before in Indian music.

Besides his own compositions, Ilaiyaraaja further adapted works from classical musicians. "Mahaganapathim" is based on the composition of the same name by Muthuswami Dikshitar. Innovatively, there is no use of mridangam in the track. "Moham Ennum" and "Manadhil Urudhi Vendum" were taken from the verses of poet Subramania Bharati. "Mari Mari Ninne", a kirtana by the Carnatic musician Tyagaraja, was reused for this film.

== Track listing ==
=== Tamil ===
| No. | Title | Lyrics | Singers | Length |
|---|---|---|---|---|
| 1. | "Mahaganapathim" | Muthuswami Dikshitar | K. J. Yesudas | 4:32 |
| 2. | "Mari Mari Ninne" | Tyagaraja | K. J. Yesudas | 2:48 |
| 3. | "Poomaalai Vaangi Vanthen" | Vairamuthu | K. J. Yesudas | 4:30 |
| 4. | "Moham Ennum" | Subramania Bharati | K. J. Yesudas | 2:41 |
| 5. | "Kalaivaniye" | Vaali | K. J. Yesudas | 3:54 |
| 6. | "Naan Oru Sindhu" | Vairamuthu | K. S. Chithra | 4:03 |
| 7. | "Paadariyen" | Vairamuthu | K. S. Chithra | 5:29 |
| 8. | "Thanni Thotti Thedi Vantha" | Vairamuthu | K. J. Yesudas | 6:00 |
| 9. | "Manadhil Urudhi Vendum" | Subramania Bharati | K. J. Yesudas | 2:00 |
| Total length: | | | | 33:12 |

=== Telugu ===
| No. | Title | Lyrics | Singer(s) | Length |
|---|---|---|---|---|
| 1. | "Mahaganapathim" | Muthuswami Dikshitar | K. J. Yesudas | 4:59 |
| 2. | "Mari Mari" | Tyagaraja | K. J. Yesudas | 3:05 |
| 3. | "Moham Manudu" | Aarudhra | K. J. Yesudas | 1:08 |
| 4. | "Nee Dayarada" | Tyagaraja | K. J. Yesudas | 3:06 |
| 5. | "Nekudithi" | Vijay Ratnam Gona | K. J. Yesudas | 4:42 |
| 6. | "Nenoka Sindhu" | G. Satyamurthy | P. Susheela | 4:54 |
| 7. | "Paadalenu" | G. Satyamurthy | K. S. Chithra | 5:17 |
| 8. | "Poomala" | Acharya Athreya | K. J. Yesudas | 4:34 |
| 9. | "Rasamanjari" | Aarudhra | K. J. Yesudas | 4:01 |
| Total length: | | | | 35:50 |

== Reception ==
Suresh Kannan of Ananda Vikatan attributed that the songs in the film gives an impact to the audience where they would hear it in a Carnatic music Sabha; he further appreciated Yesudas and Chitra's vocals and Vairamuthu's lyrics. Historian G. Dhananjayan considers Sindhu Bhairavi a film where Balachander was successful in reflecting the thoughts of Ilaiyaraaja. Archana Nathan of Scroll.in described the soundtrack as a "beautiful blend of Carnatic, Tamil light and folk music."

Sindhu Bhairavi's success led Balachander collaborate with Ilaiyaraaja for Punnagai Mannan (1986), Manathil Urudhi Vendum (1987), Rudraveena and its remake Unnal Mudiyum Thambi (both 1988) and Pudhu Pudhu Arthangal (1989). The latter was the final film with this collaboration, as Balachander split with Ilaiyaraaja owing to creative differences.

== Accolades ==
| Award | Category | Recipient(s) and nominee(s) | Result | Ref. |
|---|---|---|---|---|
| 33rd National Film Awards | Best Music Direction | Ilaiyaraaja | Won | |
| 33rd National Film Awards | Best Female Playback Singer | K. S. Chithra (for the songs "Paadariyen" and "Naan Oru Sindhu") | Won | |

== Controversy ==
Despite Ilaiyaraaja's music being critically acclaimed, he also met with staunch criticism from classical musicians over the song "Mari Mari Ninne", claiming that he changed the original Kambhoji raga (which the song was set in) to Saramathi for this film. In his book A Southern Music: The Karnatik Story, Carnatic singer T. M. Krishna felt the film version destroyed the essence of the original composition.
