= RKP =

RKP can stand for:

- Swedish People's Party (Finland)
- Swedish National Bureau of Investigation, Rikskriminalpolisen, abbreviated RKP
- RKP (b), Russian Communist Party (bolsheviks). In Russian, Российская Коммунистическая Партия (большевиков), РКП(б))
- Native Polish Church - Polish acronym for the Slavic pagan religious association
- R. K. Padmanabha, Indian Carnatic music vocalist known by his initials RKP
- IATA code RKP, assigned to Aransas County Airport
