= Mrigaya =

Mrigaya (lit. 'hunt') may refer to:

- Mrigayaa, a 1976 Indian Hindi-language film by Mrinal Sen
- Mrigaya (1989 film), a 1989 Indian Malayalam-language film by I. V. Sasi
- Mrigya, an Indian fusion band based in Delhi
