= Violin in music =

== Classical music ==
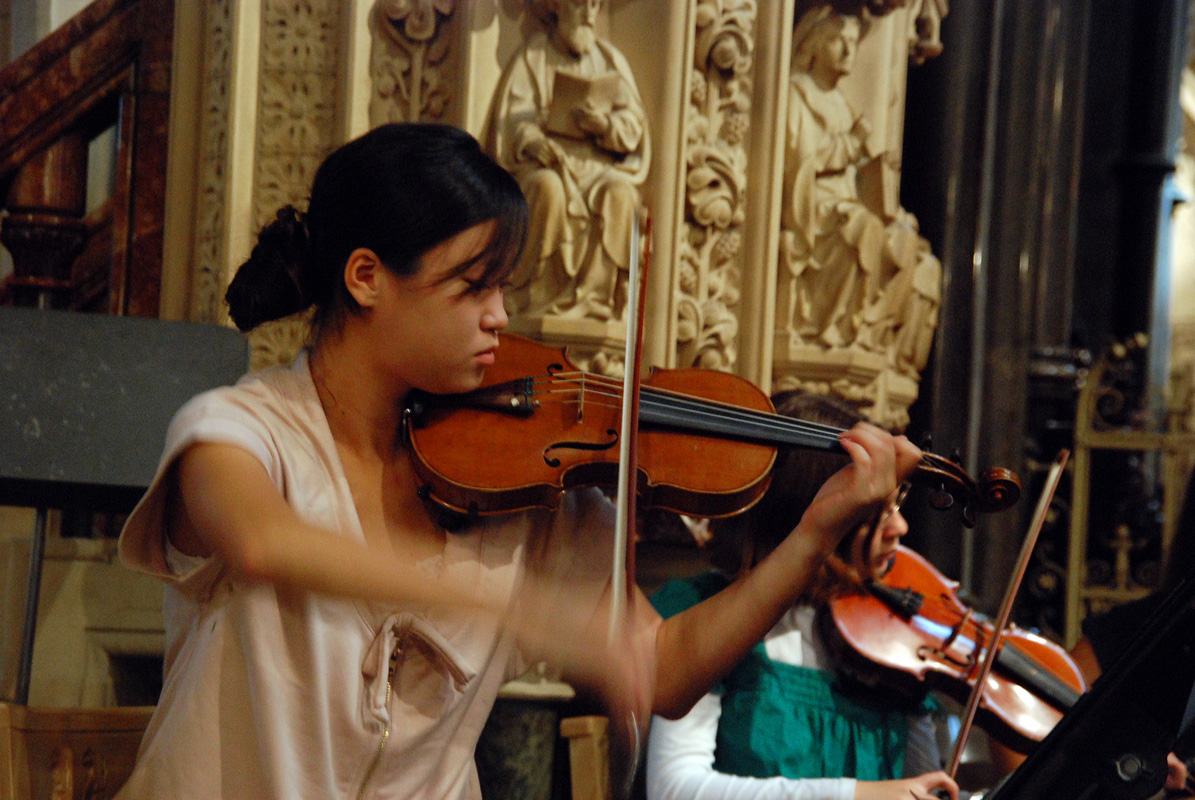
A girl playing a violin in Dublin

Since the Baroque era, the violin (Baroque violin) has been one of the most important of all instruments in classical music, for several reasons. The tone of the violin stands out above other instruments, making it appropriate for playing a melody line. In the hands of an adept player, the violin is extremely agile, and can execute rapid and difficult sequences of notes.

The violin is also considered a very expressive instrument, which is often felt to approximate the human voice. This may be due to the possibility of vibrato and of slight expressive adjustments in pitch and timbre. Many leading composers have contributed to the violin concerto and violin sonata repertories.

Violins make up a large part of an orchestra, and are usually divided into two sections, known as the first and second violins. Composers often assign the melody to the first violins (who are often given more technically difficult music), while second violins play harmony, accompaniment patterns or the melody in a lower range than the first violins. A string quartet similarly has parts for first and second violins, as well as a viola part, and a bass instrument, such as the cello or, rarely, the double bass.

Some modern classical violinists are returning to the art of improvisation as an integral part of their classical music performance, with their own improvisations and embellishments in cadenzas, and even entire concerts through improvisation. These include Algerian-French violinist Gilles Apap, Finnish violinist-composer Pekka Kuusisto and Australian violinist-composer Rupert Guenther.

== Popular music ==
During the 1920s and early-1930s, violins were an integral part of popular music, especially for dance music. Dance orchestras typically had at least 2 or 3 violins, although high class society orchestras would often include as many as 6 or 7. With the introduction of swing music in 1935, the violin, along with other string instruments, dropped out of popular music as they were deemed inappropriate for the swing sound. Violins would only re-emerge in popular music in the late-1960s.

While the violin has had very little usage in rock music compared to its brethren the guitar and bass guitar, it is being increasingly absorbed into mainstream pop. Independent artists such as Final Fantasy and Andrew Bird have increased interest as well, creating a subcategory of indie rock that some have termed "violindie".

The violin is also used in mainstream pop acts like Vanessa-Mae, Bond, Miri Ben-Ari, Yellowcard, Nigel Kennedy, and Dave Matthews Band with Boyd Tinsley and Jean-Luc Ponty; U2 also frequently uses the violin, especially the electric violin. The violin is also a part of the huge phenomenon called cello rock. The hugely popular Motown recordings of the 1960s and 1970s relied heavily on strings as part of the trademark texture. Earlier genres of pop music, at least those separate from the Rock 'n' Roll movement, tended to make use of fairly traditional Orchestras, sometimes large ones; examples include the American "Crooners" such as Bing Crosby.

Though bowed strings were heavily popular and relied upon in almost all types of music genre recordings in the 1960s and 1970s, disco music, which surged aggressively onto the music scene in the early to mid-1970s, also relied heavily upon strings within its compositions; in fact, almost all disco/dance music of that era incorporated the use of strings within its compositions and arrangements. When the sudden decline of disco began in the early-1980s, the use of strings not only dwindled in disco music, but ceased in almost all types of popular music during that time and more so immediately after disco's decline in relative popularity. The 1980s saw an insurgence of electronic music mimicking strings with little or no use of traditional strings in music compositions. Now strings are making a comeback in pop music.

Indian, Pakistani, Turkish and Arabic pop music is filled with the sound of violins, both soloists and ensembles.

== Jazz ==
The earliest references to jazz performance using the violin as a solo instrument are documented during the first decades of the 20th century. The first great jazz violinist was Eddie South who is best known as the Dark Angel Of Violin. In the swing and post-war eras there were many superb improvising violinists including Stéphane Grappelli, Stuff Smith, Ray Perry, Ray Nance and Claude "Fiddler" Williams.

=== Modern jazz, 1961-present ===
Noteworthy modern jazz violinists who joined the scene between 1960 and 1990 and usually played in an avant-garde vein include Didier Lockwood, Leroy Jenkins, Billy Bang, Malcolm Goldstein, Michael White, John Blake, Jr., and Florin Niculescu. Younger performers include Mat Maneri, Katt Hernandez and Regina Carter.

Jazz fusion violinists include Jean-Luc Ponty and Michal Urbaniak.

== Folk music ==
Like many other instruments of classical music, the violin descends from remote ancestors, cruder in form, that were used for folk music. Following a stage of intensive development in the late Renaissance, largely in Italy, the violin had improved (in volume, tone, and agility), to the point that it not only became a very important instrument in art music, but proved highly appealing to folk musicians as well. As a folk instrument, the violin ultimately spread very widely, sometimes displacing earlier bowed instruments, and ethnomusicologists have observed its use in many locations throughout Europe, Asia, and the Americas.

In many traditions of folk music, the tunes are not written but are memorized by successive generations of musicians and passed on in what is known as the oral tradition.

== Fiddle ==
When played as a folk instrument, the violin is ordinarily referred to in English as a fiddle.

One difference between fiddles and ordinary violins may be seen in American (e.g., bluegrass and old-time music) fiddling. In these styles, the bridge is sometimes shaved down so that it is slightly less curved. This reduces the range of motion needed for shuffle bowings which alternate between pairs of strings.

There is quite often only a single fiddle playing in any given venue, although twin fiddling is represented in some styles. By contrast, violins often play in sections – several individuals playing the same instrument, typically in a symphony orchestra – since sound reinforcement prior to electronic amplification was only possible by adding more instruments. The Italian term ripieno may be translated as filling (or "stuffing" in the culinary sense), since multiple instruments "fill out" the sound.

== Indian classical music ==
The Indian violin, while essentially the same instrument as that used in Western music, is different in some senses. The instrument is tuned so that the IV and III strings (G and D on a western-tuned violin) and the II and I (A and E) strings are sa-pa (do-sol) pairs and sound the same but are offset by an octave, resembling common scordatura or fiddle cross-tunings such as CGCG or AEAE. The tonic sa (do) is not fixed, but variably tuned to accommodate the vocalist or lead player.

The way the musician holds the instrument varies from Western to Indian music. In Indian music the musician sits on the floor cross-legged with the right foot out in front of them. The scroll of the instrument rests on the foot. This position is essential to playing well due to the nature of Indian music. The hand can move all over the fingerboard and there is no set position for the left hand, so it is important for the violin to be in a steady, unmoving position.

The violin is a very important part of Indian classical music. It is believed to have been introduced to the Indian tradition by Baluswamy Dikshitar brother of Muthuswami Dikshitar. The violin is primarily used as support for a vocalist, as the sound of a violin complements that of the singer, but is also largely played solo.

In solo violin concerts, the violinist is accompanied by percussion instruments, usually the tabla, the mridangam and the ghatam.

The violin is also a principal instrument for Indian film music. V. S. Narasimhan is among the leading players in the South Indian film industry, with many hits in the film world.

== See also ==
- List of violinists
- List of Indian violinists
- List of fiddlers
- American fiddle
