= Strings of the World =

Music festival in India, 2012 to 2019

- Genre: Indian classical music, Hindustani classical music, Scottish music

Strings of the World is a music festival in India focusing on string instruments, particularly bowed string instruments. It is conceptualised and directed by Sharat Chandra Srivastava

== History ==
The first edition of Strings of the World was held on November 16 and 17, 2012 in Gurugram, India

== Editions ==
So far there have been five editions of this festival:

- Edition I - November 16–17, 2012, Gurugram
- Edition II - November 22–23, 2013, Blue Frog, Delhi
- Edition III - November 14–15, 2014, Garden of Five Senses, Delhi
- Edition IV - November 20, 2015, Gurugram
- Edition V - October 19, 2019, NCPA, Mumbai

== Musicians ==
The following musicians/bands have performed in Strings of the World:

Musician/band	Performed in editions
Utsav Lal	2012, 2013
Tim Kliphuis	2012
Gjermund Larsen	2012
Liu Guangyu	2012
Susmit Sen Chronicles	2012
Trondheim Soloists	2012, 2013
Sharat Chandra Srivastava	all
Mrigya	2012, 2013, 2015
Heiko Lenneke Quintet	2012
Xian Yu	2012
Akhu Chingangbam	2013
Igor Bezget	2013, 2014, 2015
Nigel Richard	2014
Knut Reiersrud	2013
Tuva Faerden	2014
Su-a Lee	2014
Silver Strings	2014
