= H. K. Venkatram =

Indian Carnatic classical vocalist

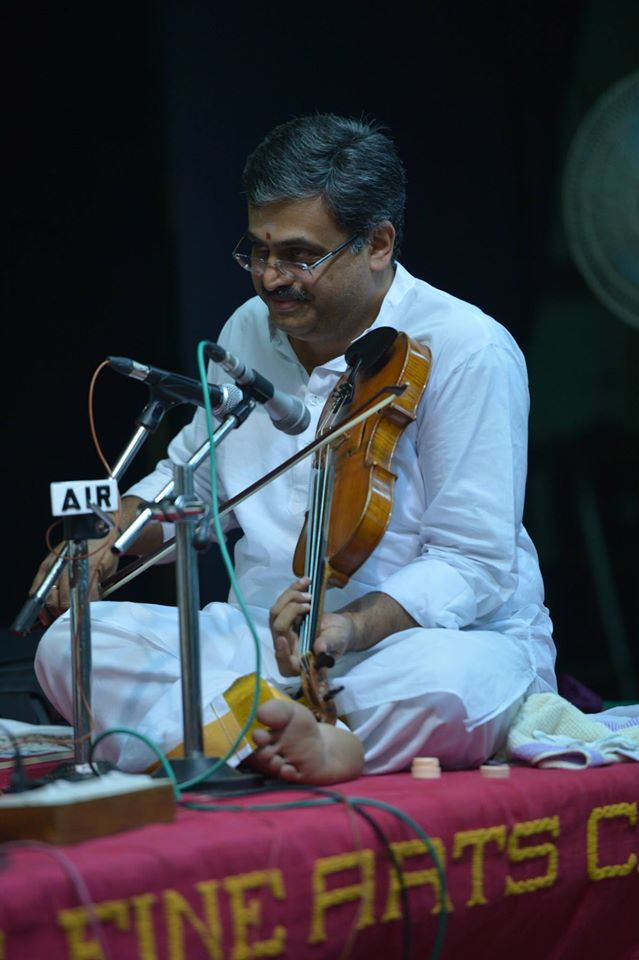
- H.K. Venkatram at a concert
- Born: 1965 (age 60–61); Bangalore, Karnataka, India
- Education: Bangalore University (Bachelor of Engineering in Electronics and Communication)
- Spouse: Triveni Saralaya (m. 1993)
- Children: 2
- Parents: Prof. H. V. Krishnamurthy; Sarala Krishnamurthy
- Honours: Sangeet Natak Akademi Award (2023)
- Musical career
- Genres: Carnatic; Indian classical; Jugalbandi
- Instrument: Violin
- Website: www.hkvenkatram.com

H. K. Venkatram is an Indian classical music violinist and Philanthropist. Venkatram has been an active violinist for over 30 years in India and abroad. He is known for his classical style of play and maturity on the violin.

== Career ==
H.K. Venkatram started learning violin from his father, Prof H.V. Krishnamurthy at the age of 7. He gave his first concert at the age of 11 with his brother. Venkatram is one of the most sought after violinists and is frequently seen in classical concerts in India and abroad. He is known for understanding the nuances of Carnatic Music and stressing on strictly following the classical approach to playing the violin. He has performed alongside renowned artistes like Balamurali Krishna, Mandolin U. Srinivas, Umayalpuram Sivaraman, T.M. Krishna, Semmangudi Srinivasa Iyer, RK Srikanthan, KV Narayanaswamy, DK Pattammal, Dr M L Vasanthakumari, Kadri Gopalnath, Dr N Ramani, TN Seshagopalan, TV Sankaranarayanan, Trichur V. Ramachandran, Chitravina N. Ravikiran among many others. In 1999, Venkatram released a CD on Tyagaraja’s "Ghana Raga Pancharatnam" during the Tyagaraja Festival held in Cleveland, USA. Venkatram has also published a book called "Tyagaraja Vachanamrita" which is based on the compositions of Thyagaraja. Venkatram is also part of a famous Veena Venu Violin trio which consists of Ashwin Anand (Veena) and G. Ravikiran (Flute). The trio have performed in many concerts and their music is very well received.

== Shabda ==
Venkatram along with T.M. Krishna and R. K. Shriramkumar is the co-founder of a project called "Shabda" which is aimed at creating an online archive of the various aspects pertaining to the Indian Performing Arts. It was founded in 2010. The initiative recognizes that a lot of valuable knowledge content on Indian performing arts is either unavailable or not in the proper form of documentation, and aims to make it otherwise. Each speaker will beading with a specific aspect of their art in an analytical and comprehensive manner. The lectures are for a duration of 20 minutes to ensure that it is focused.

The scope of Shabda in the present performing arts scene includes videography of lectures by eminent artists, scholars and researchers, widening the scope of content availability through internet and using technology to provide high quality content and preservation to avoid inaccuracy in documentation and retrieval. This helps to provide a useful wealth of knowledge for artists, performers, students, and connoisseurs alike. Shabda has conducted 12 lectures across 2 day-long events held at Kalakshetra, Chennai and Bangalore Gayana Samaja in 2011 and 2012, respectively.

== Prathyarpana Foundation ==
Prathyarpana Foundation was founded as a charitable initiative by Vijaya College of Music, a music college run by Venkatram and his wife, Triveni Venkatram. The institution is based in Bangalore and was inaugurated on 5 July 2015. The foundation aims to use the Performing Arts for social causes. The foundation also aims to nurture and showcase new talent in the field of music and channel it towards social causes. The collections from every event will be donated to Non-profit organisations that work towards women and child welfare.

== Awards ==
H. K. Venkatram was the recipient of the prestigious Sangeet Natak Akademi Award for the year 2023 for his contribution to carnatic violin. He received the award from President Droupadi Murmu at an investiture ceremony in Vigyan Bhawan on 6 March 2024.

Venkatram has been awarded the "Best Violinist" award in the Annual Conference of the prestigious Madras Music Academy, "Parur Sundaram Iyer Award for Senior Violinist" in 2002 and "Ganakala Shree" by the Karnataka Ganakala Parishat for his achievements in the field of Carnatic Music in 2004.

== Personal life ==
Venkatram retired as senior director at Intel Corporation year 2024. He lives in Bangalore and is married to Triveni of Saralaya Sisters fame. Venkatram and his wife manage their own music institute called Vijaya College of Music in Bangalore. The college was set up in 1953 by his father. They have a son and daughter together. His daughter, Bhargavi, is an upcoming vocalist.
