= Rudrapatna =

- city
- Location in Karnataka, India Rudrapatna (India)
- Coordinates: 12.5961°N 76.1227°E
- Country: India
- State: Karnataka
- District: Hassan

Languages
  - Official: Kannada
- Time zone: UTC+5:30 (IST)
- PIN: 573 150
- Telephone code: 08175
- Vehicle registration: KA-13

Rudrapatna is a small village on the banks of the Kaveri river in Arkalgud taluk of Hassan district in the Indian State of Karnataka.

The village is known for its rich musical heritage. The village was an abode of Veda, Nada, and Taranga, according to the renowned Carnatic vocalist, R. K. Padmanabha. Rudrapatna stands apart as it has the honour of having contributed many artistes to Carnatic music.

== Musical history ==
The village has had a rich musical history. Bhaskar Avadhani, an authority on the History of Rudrapatna calls the place the confluence of Veda Brahma and Nada Brahma. He recounts that the people of the village migrated from Sengottai in Tirunelveli District of Tamil Nadu. They came in two groups. While one group settled down at Koushika village in Hassan, another came to Bettadapura. People from there started inhabiting on the banks of river Cauvery and one such village formed as Rudrapatna. Sankethis, as they were known, practised Vedas and music. While Dikshitas and Somayajis performed Yajna and Yaga, others spent most of their time learning Shathavadhana, chanting of Veda and music. It was a place of Ghanapathi, Shatvadani, Ashtavadhani and musicians. The Channakeshava Temple of this village is more than a thousand years old.

Unlike other contemporary musicians, it is claimed that musicians from this village did not aspire for Rajashraya (patronage of royalty). Renowned musician from Rudrapatna R K Padmanabha adds that a mass desertion of the village took place following a plague. He also claims that nearly 60 per cent of the currently performing Carnatic musicians in Karnataka hail from Rudrapatna.

== Noted musicians ==
Several noted musicians such as R.S. Keshavamurthy, R.K. Ramanathan, R.K. Srikantan, R.K.Srinivasamurthy, R.K. Suryanarayana, R.N. Thyagarajan and R.N. Tharanathan (also known as Rudrapatnam Brothers), R.K. Raghavan, R.K. Prakash, R K Prasanna Kumar, R.K. Padmanabha, R.S. Ramakanth, R.N. Sreelatha and Rathnamala Prakash (a renowned light music artist also), R.P. Prashanth and R.P. Pramod (also known as Rudrapatna Veena Brothers), who have carved a niche for themselves, hail from this village.

R.K. Krishna Shastry was another noted vocalist and Harikathe Vidwan, who hailed from Rudrapatna. Venkataramiah, popularly known as Thimmappa, was a renowned Veena vidwan. He is best known for his Viriboni Varna in Kedaragowla raga. Shathavadhani Venkataraya was another popular veena vidwan. Veene Shamanna, Veene Shrikantaiah, Veene Ranganath and R.S. Keshava Murthy, who was a disciple of the legendary Veene Subbanna are all from Rudrapatna. Music critic Mysore V Subrahmanya has noted that the village has produced several musicians and scholars, including Veena Rangashastry, who have occupied the position of court musicians at the Mysore palace.

R. K. Shriramkumar is another noted Violin Vidwan, having been conferred the coveted Sangeetha Kalanidhi title by the Madras Music Academy.

Shashank Subramanyam is a renowned flautist further hailing from Rudrapatna.

Notable personalities

- R. Shamasastry - Sanskrit scholar and discoverer of the lost manuscript of the Arthashastra
