= Vidya Vanam =

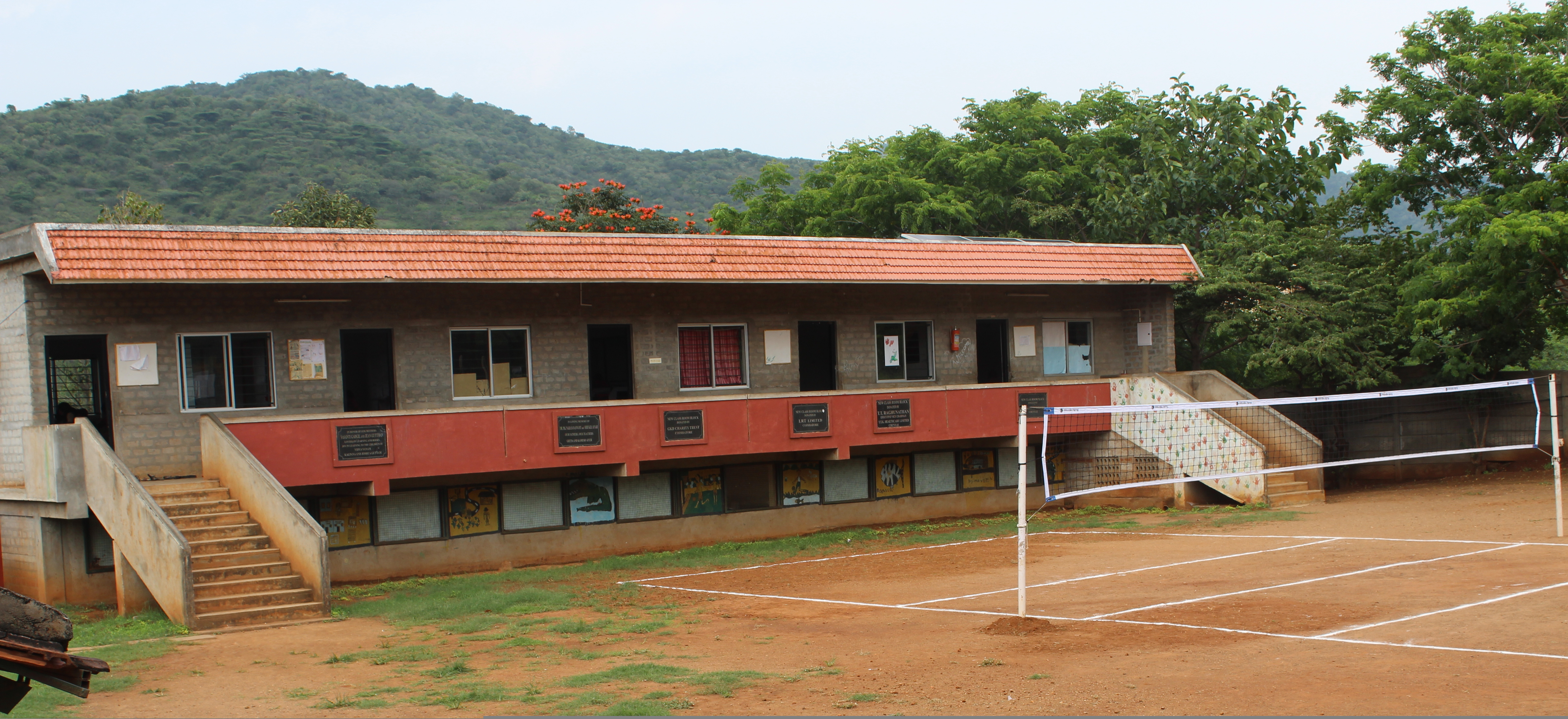
- Coimbatore, India, Tamil Nadu

Information
- Type: Private school
- Established: 2007
- Founder: Bhuvana Foundation
- Director: Prema Rangachary
- Gender: Mixed school
- Affiliation: Edexcel IGCSE
- Website: www.vidyavanam.org

Vidya Vanam is a school located at Anaikatti, Tamil Nadu.

== History ==
The school was started in 2007 by the Bhuvana Foundation with just 40 students, today it teaches more than 300 local tribal children. Vidya Vanam means knowledge in the wilderness. Vidya Vanam serves the needs of the Irula people. Prema Rangachary is the Director of the school. Most of the students are first generation learners. In this school, there are no fixed classrooms and the teachers learn along with their students.

== Teaching Philosophy ==
Vidya Vanam does not have examinations until 7th grade to reduce pressure on the children. They do not have prescribed text books until 7th grade. Vidya Vanam follows the Montessori method blended with theme based learning which is molded and customized by the teachers, in accordance with the living environment of the tribal community. This helps the children to relate what they learn with why they learn and thus find meaning in the value of education. From 8th standard onwards, children are trained to appear for the public examination. Even though Vidya Vanam does not have state government's affiliation, they manage to appear for the SSLC through the National Institute of Open Schooling (NIOS). They also have concurrence with the international syllabus Edexcel IGCSE.

== Educational Conferences ==
Vidya Vanam has been conducting International Educational Conferences since 2014. Their first conference in 2014 was based on the theme ‘Education for a Caring Society’. The second conference, which was in 2016, was based on the theme 'Democracy in Education'. The third conference, which was in 2018, was based on the theme 'Peace in Education'.

Delegates and speakers who attended the conference include Prof. Samdhong Rimpoche, Dr. Shashi Tharoor, Vidwan TM Krishna and Perumal Murugan.
