= M. S. Anantharaman =

Indian Violin exponent (1924–2018)

- Born: Mylapore Sundaram Anantharaman; 26 August 1924; Paravur near Aluva, Kingdom of Cochin, British India
- Died: 19 February 2018 (aged 93); Mylapore, Chennai, Tamil Nadu, India
- Other name: Parur M. S. Anantharaman
- Citizenship: India
- Occupation: instrumentalist
- Children: 3, M. S. Sundaresan, M. A. Krishnaswamy, and M. A. Bhagirati
- Parent: Parur Sundaram Iyer
- Relatives: M. S. Gopalakrishnan (brother)
- Awards: Sangeet Natak Akademi Award; Kalaimamani
- Musical career
- Genres: Carnatic music
- Instrument: Violin

Mylapore Sundaram Anantharaman (26 August 1924 – 19 February 2018) was an Indian Carnatic and Hindustani violinist. He was an exponent of Parur style of violin playing. He received several awards including Kalaimamani Award and Sangeet Natak Akademi Award.

== Biography ==
M. S. Anantharaman was born on 26 August 1924, in a musical family in Paravur, Aluva in present-day Ernakulam district of Kerala. His father Parur Sundaram Iyer was a violinist in the royal palace of Travancore. Iyer, migrated to Chennai from Kerala in 1932. Anantharaman learned the violin at the age of six from his father Sundaram Iyer. His father, who introduced Violin in Hindusthani music, trained Anantharaman and his brother M. S. Gopalakrishnan, both Carnatic and Hindustani music. His elder sister Parur Sitalakshmi was also a violinist. He made his debut at the age of seven. He and his sister played violin duets at the Ramanathaswamy Temple, Subramaniya Swamy Temple, Tiruchendur and Kanyakumari Temple.

Anantharaman designed his own style with his brother. The brothers were popular in Parur Bani (mix of Hidustani and Carnatic styles). He was a regular participant at concerts in Chennai as part of the Markazi festival. Later, when M. S. Gopalakrishnan performed his own violin concerts, Anantharaman became accustomed to accompanying musicians on the violin. Anantharaman became a violinist along with Carnatic musicians including M. S. Subbulakshmi and Hindustani musicians including Omkarnath Thakur.

He has served as a professor of violin in the Tamil Nadu Government Music College in Chennai from 1962 to 1983. Later, he taught violin in Pittsburgh, United States also.

His sons M. S. Sundareswaran and M. A. Krishnaswamy were also Carnatic violinists. His daughter M. A. Bhagirathi is a Carnatic vocalist.

He died on 19 February 2018, at his home at Sri Apparswamy Koil Street, Mylapore, Chennai, Tamil Nadu.

== Awards and honors ==
- Sangeet Natak Akademi Award 1998
- Kalaimamani award of the Tamil Nadu Eyal Isai Nataka Manram
- T.T.K award of the Music Academy 1996
- Sangeetha Kala Acharya of the Music Academy
- He was the Asthana Vidwan (Head Scholar) of the Kanchi Kamakoti Peetham
