= R. K. Padmanabha =

Indian Carnatic music vocalist

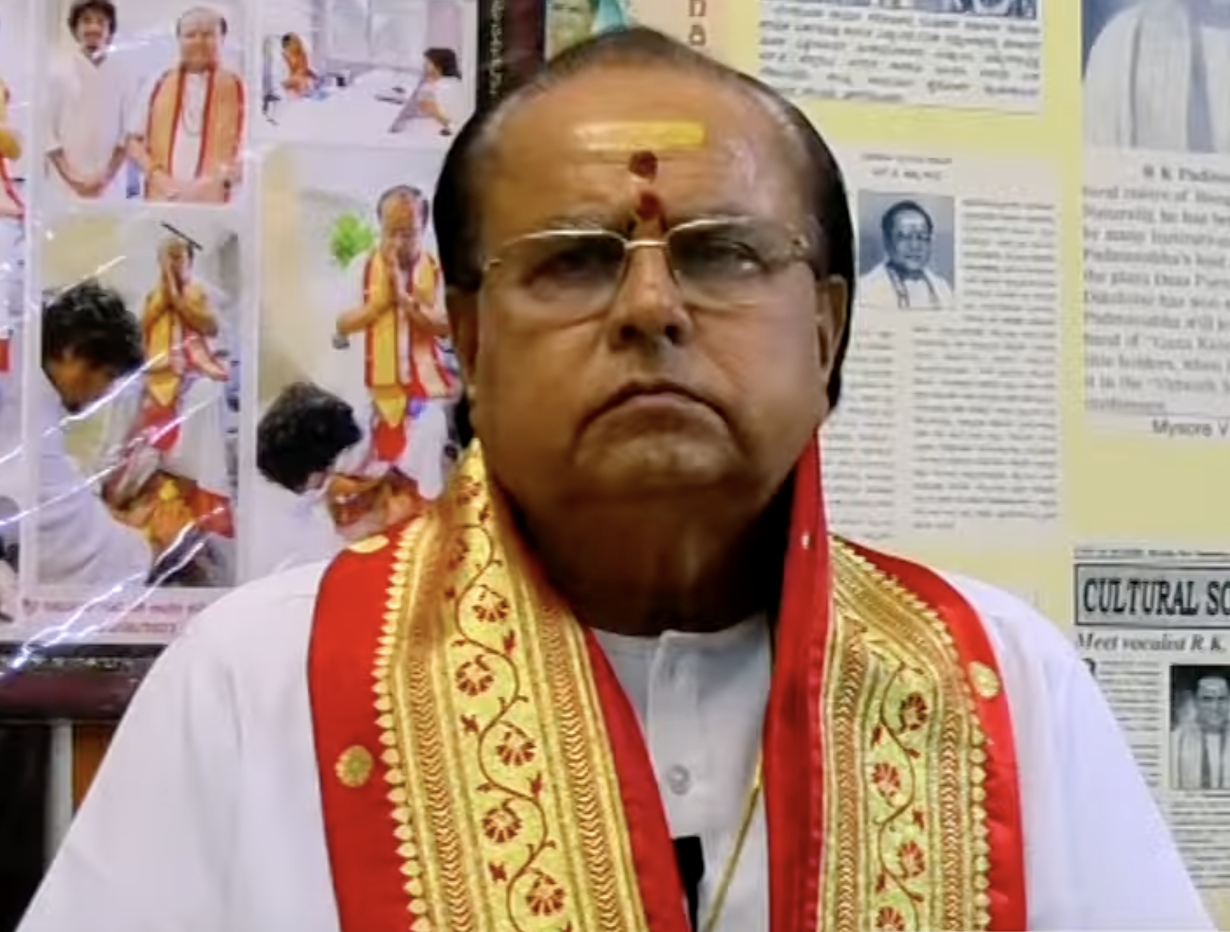
- Padmanabha in October 2022
- Born: Rudrapatna Krishnadikshita Padmanabha; Rudrapatna, Mysore State, India
- Occupation: Carnatic music singer
- Years active: 1975–present
- Awards: Kempegowda Award; Sangeet Natak Akademi Award

Rudrapatna Krishnadikshita Padmanabha commonly known by his initials RKP, is an Indian Carnatic music vocalist, performer, music teacher and author from the state of Karnataka. He established "Sapta Swara Devatha Dhyana Mandira" at native village Rudrapatna, Karnataka, memorializing renowned musicians of Indian classical music. He has been serving as the president of Karnataka Ganakala Parishat since 2004. He received Kempegowda Award and Sangeet Natak Akademi Award.

== Early life ==
Padmanabha was born in Rudrapatna village, Hassan district, Mysore State (now in Karnataka) where he received secondary education.

== Career ==
A recital by Padmanabha in October 2022

Padmanabha moved to Bangalore and started working at State Bank of India in early 1970s. In 1974, he joined Vijaya College of Music in Bangalore to learn music, and debuted on-stage in 1975. He trained from his guru, H. V. Krishnamurthy.

Proficient in tanams (one of the methods of raga improvisation), he conducted 500 concerts, as of July 2011, where group learning and singing is performed. He also teaches music – 99% of his students who learn goshti gayanam (transl. group singing) are women. Known for teaching music to financially underprivileged students free of cost, he organizes free teaching classes at some of his gatherings in Bangalore, and held free music concerts in several towns across Karnataka – Belur, Bijapur, Gadag-Betageri, Holenarasipura, Mandya, Nanjangud, Ramanathapura and Tumkur. In 1990, he established a music school, Sharada Kala Kendra, at his house in Jayaprakash Nagar, Bangalore. Manasi Prasad, a recipient of Ustad Bismillah Khan Yuva Puraskar from the Sangeet Natak Akademi, is his disciple.

He established a cultural centre near Indian Institute of Management Bangalore where he organizes an event of goshti gayanam with his students. As of June 2013, he wrote 80 compositions, tuned 100 kritis (a format of composition in Carnatic music) of Vadiraja Tirtha.

He strives to bring awareness about music among people. In March 2013, he organized a six-hour walking tour singing all the way from Bannerghatta road until Nisarga Extension near Bannerghatta National Park in Bangalore covering a distance of 16 kilometres (9.9 mi). He has involved himself in activism to improve the welfare of Arkalgud taluk, the sub-district which his native village Rudrapatna is a part of. In 2020, he was part of an expert committee formed by Kannada University to investigate the birth place of Purandara Dasa, one of the chief founding-proponents of Carnatic music.

Padmanabha established a housing society, "Naada Loka", at Rudrapatna for musicians. In 2001, he presided as the chairman of the Experts Committee of Karnataka Ganakala Parishat and eventually became the organization's president in 2004 and has been since serving as such.

=== Sapta Swara Devatha Dhyana Mandira ===
Padmanabha conceived a memorial "Sapta Swara Devatha Dhyana Mandira" at Rudrapatna, where several musicians, scholars and artists originated, in the shape of tanpura dedicated to 6 classical musicians – Kanaka Dasa, Muthuswami Dikshitar, Purandara Dasa, Shyama Shastri, Tyagaraja and Vadiraja Tirtha. Their statues lie in the memorial with a statue of Saraswati, Hindu goddess of knowledge, at the centre – each of the 7 statues representing a svara (musical note) and collectively the seven svaras of Indian classical music. Opened in 2008–09, the 70-foot (21 m) high memorial structure hosts an exhibition of musicians and various annual concerts.

=== Music festivals ===
Since 2002, Padmanabha organizes an annual music festival in May "Sangeetha Sammelanam" and "Gana Sharardham" at Rudrapatna commemorating the memories of Tyagaraja, a composer and vocalist of Carnatic music. He founded Rudrapatna Sangeetotsava Samiti Trust, which has been organizing a music festival in the village since early 2000s, and acts as its managing trustee. Proceeds from these events are used as aid in the village. He also established Vadiraja Kala Bhavana through which he organizes music festivals and conducts workshops in gurukula format.

== Views ==
"Music unites us, irrespective of our differences. It belongs to everyone[.]"

— R. K. Padmanabha on Indian classical music

Padmanabha views classical music as an instrument of cleansing one's mind making them energetic and cheerful. However, he is against pursuing music as a profession.

== Works ==
Padmanabha has authored several books.

- Anantha Naada (Geya Kadambari) (in Kannada). Prism Publications. 1 January 2011. ISBN 978-8172867072.
- Mela Maala (in Kannada). Prism Publications. 1 January 2012. ISBN 978-8172867041. The book introduces the scheme of classification of ragas into 72 musical notes, originally proposed by 17th century musicologist and composer Venkatamakhin, along with his own compositions to neophytes of music. The book contains the lyrics and notations and the CD includes his voice recordings.
- Naadabindu (in Kannada). Darpan. 2014. ISBN 978-8172868475.
- Nenapinangaladalli (in Kannada). Prism Publications. 1 January 2010. ISBN 978-8172866136.
- Purnadara Dasaru - Karnataka Sangeeta Pitamahare (in Kannada). Sampada Publications. 2015. ISBN 978-9384197131.
- Samarpana (in Kannada). Prism Publications. 2010. ISBN 978-8172866129.
- Vipra Vikrama

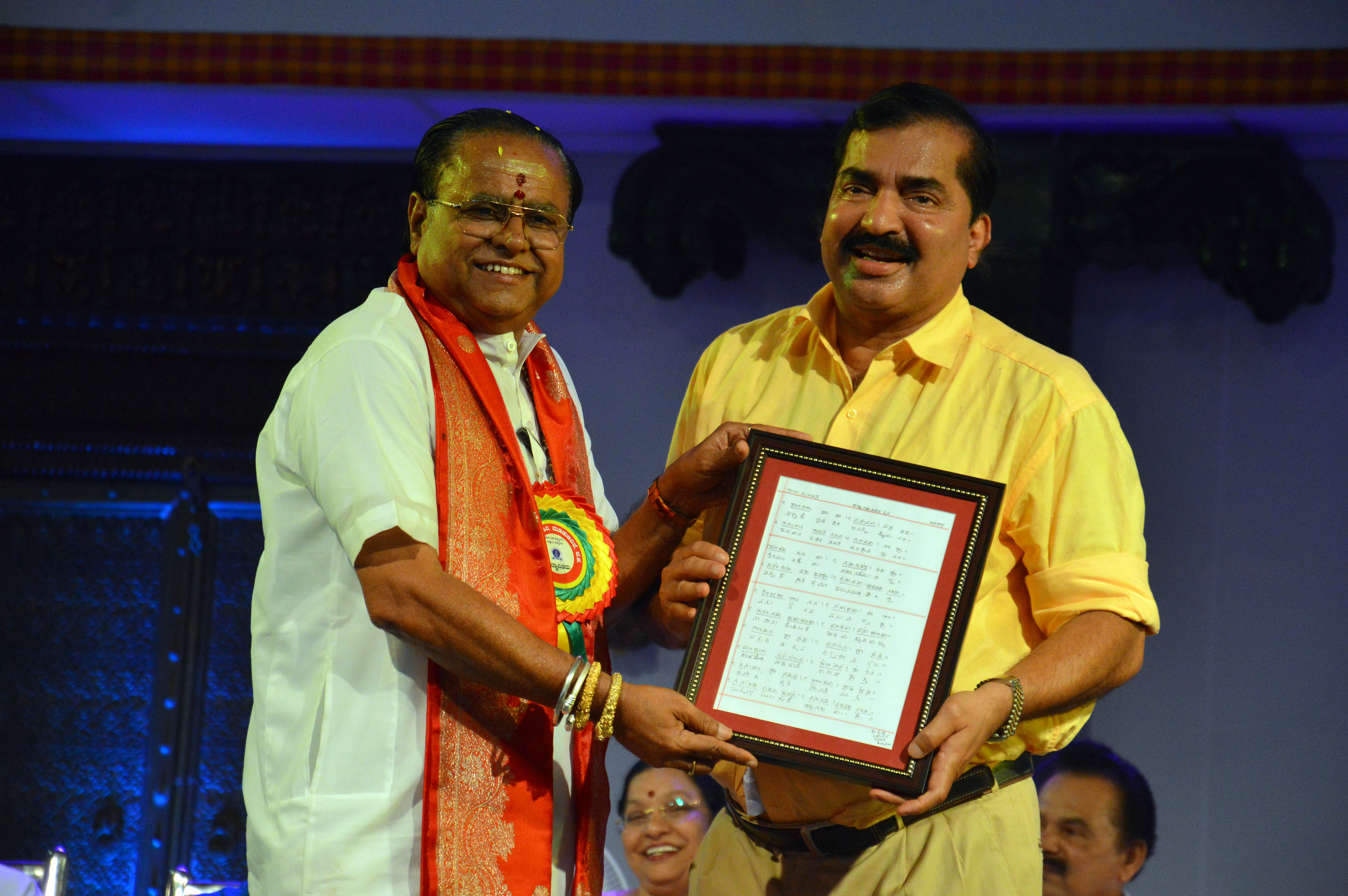
Padmanabha being felicitated with Nadusiri Award at Alva's Nudisiri conference in 2015

Apart from books, he has also released several CDs with his recordings of various themes of Carnatic music.

== Awards ==
Padmanabha was conferred with Kempegowda Award in 2013 by Bruhat Bengaluru Mahanagara Palike, the administrative body of Bangalore. He received Sangeet Natak Akademi Award, the highest civilian award in the country given to performing artists, by the Government of India.

== Personal life ==
Padmanabha lives in Bangalore.
