= Tap Water Award =

Performing arts award (2001–2006)

The Tap Water Awards were awarded to performers at the Edinburgh Festival Fringe between 2001 and 2006 in changing categories including theatre, comedy, dance, storytelling and Arabic poetry. They were established by supporters of The Bongo Club, a non-profit Edinburgh venue, in opposition to the high-profile Perrier Awards (now the Edinburgh Comedy Awards). The name tap water contrasts with Perrier, a brand of bottled water owned by Nestlé. The opposition was part of The Bongo Club's broader participation in the Nestlé boycott, a global protest at Nestlé's allegedly excessive promotion of breast-milk substitutes in developing countries to the detriment of infant health. In 2006 Perrier withdrew from sponsoring the Edinburgh Comedy Awards and the Tap Water Awards have not been held since.

The prize was preceded by the Tapwater Award of the mid- to late-1990s.

== See also ==
- Edinburgh Comedy Award
- Nestlé boycott
