= Sunita Bhuyan =

Indian violin player

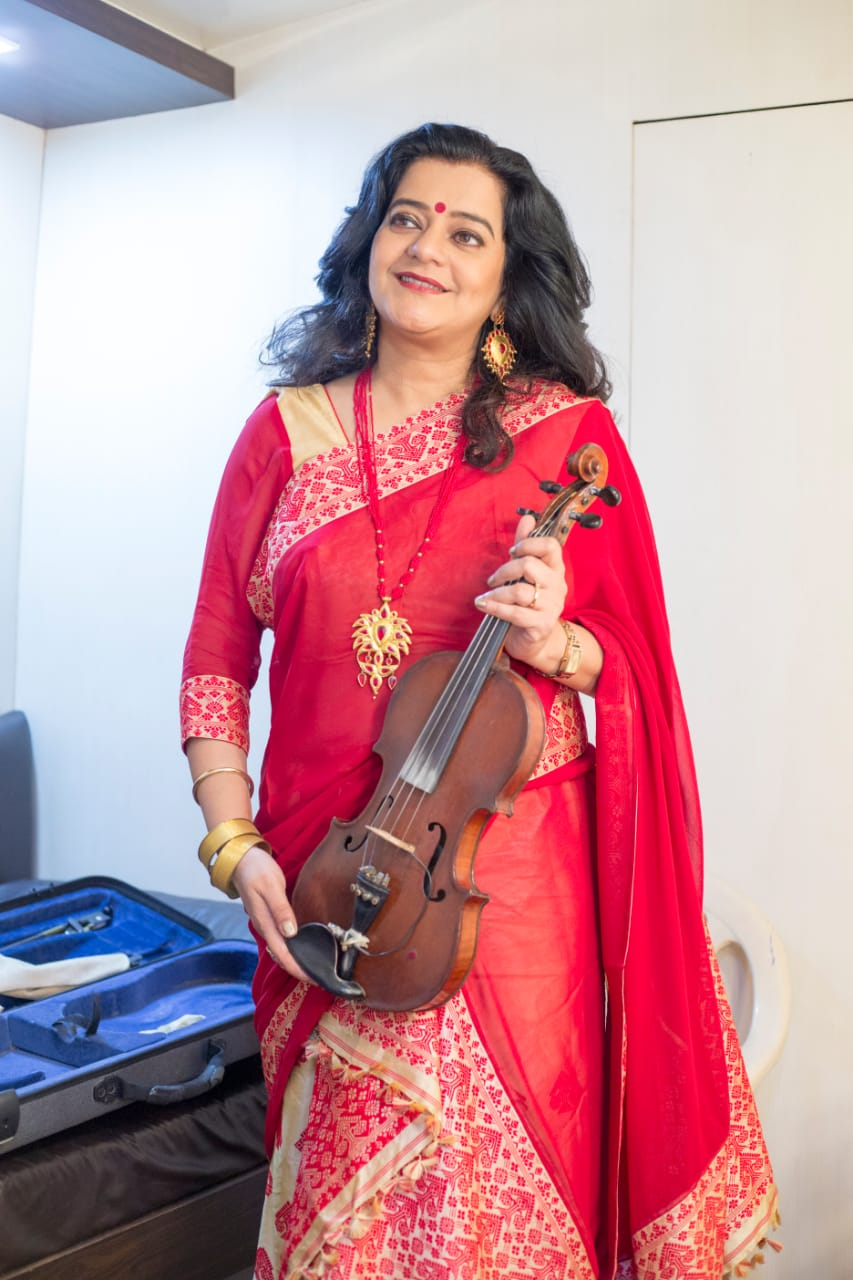
- Born: Shillong, Meghalaya India
- Occupations: Violinist & HR Practitioner

Sunita Bhuyan is an Indian violinist & Human Resource Trainer. She began her musical career at the age of 8. She is a pioneer in the field of integrating Music in Human Resources, Creativity & Wellbeing; an MBA and Masters in Music her mother, Minoti Khaund, was a Hindustani classical violinist. Bhuyan was initially trained by her mother and later learned from the Pandit V. G. Jog. Her album Bihu Strings by Times Music is the first album of Indian folk music on violin.

== Awards received ==
- Rashtriya Pratibha Samman
- FICCI FLO women's award
- She Inspires Global cultural Champion UK
- Dell Global Culure Ambassador
- Priyadarshini Award for excellence
- Giants International Award for women
- REX Karmaveer global awards
- Woman of the decade- Women's Economic Forum
- An award from Pope Francis for her work on music therapy with underprivileged children, cancer patients and people with disability
