= M. S. Gopalakrishnan =

Indian violinist (1931–2013)

MS Gopalakrishnan
- Born: Mylapore Sundaram Gopalakrishnan; 10 June 1931; Chennai
- Died: 3 January 2013 (aged 81)
- Occupation: violinist
- Spouse: Meenakshi
- Children: Narmadha, Latha, Suresh

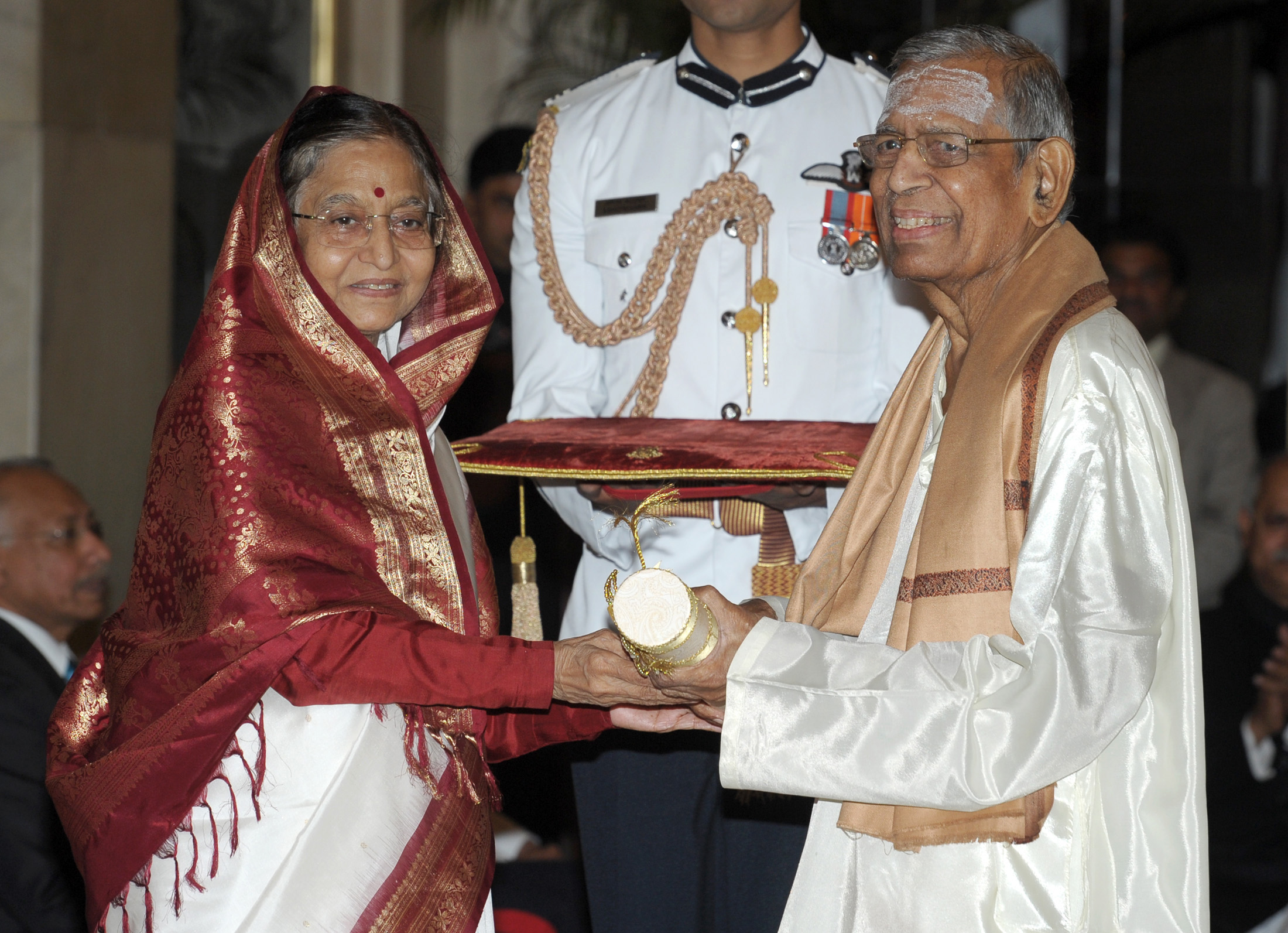
Then President, Smt. Pratibha Devisingh Patil presenting the Padma Bhushan Award to Shri M.S. Gopalakrishnan, at an Investiture Ceremony-II, at Rashtrapati Bhavan, in New Delhi on April 04, 2012

M.S. Gopalakrishnan, a.k.a. MSG, (10 June 1931 – 3 January 2013) was a violinist in the field of Carnatic music. He is commonly grouped with Lalgudi Jayaraman and T.N.Krishnan as part of the violin-trinity of Carnatic music. He was awarded the Madras Music Academy's Sangeetha Kalanidhi in 1997. Gopalakrishnan was a recipient of the Padma Bhushan, Padma Shri, Kalaimamani, Sangeetha Kalanidhi and Sangeet Natak Akademi awards.

== Life and career ==
Gopalakrishnan was born in Mylapore, Chennai, India, and was taught the violin by his father, Parur Sundaram Iyer, who was well versed in both Carnatic and Hindustani systems of Indian classical music. He learned both systems from his father, with whom he gave his first performance when he was 8 years old. He also drew great inspiration from the legendary violinist Sri Dwaram Venkataswamy Naidu.

He played the violin for over fifty years as a soloist and accompanist, having accompanied Omkarnath Thakur and D. V. Paluskar, and toured Australia, the US, the UK, the Netherlands, South Africa, Malaysia, and Hong Kong.

His daughter, Dr M. Narmadha, is also a violinist. His elder brother M. S. Anantharaman (1924-2018) was a well-known violinist. The family's violin playing style, known as ‘Parur bani’, is being kept alive by the third generation, the children of Anantharaman and of MSG.

== Death ==
Gopalakrishnan died in Chennai, India, at 2:00 am on 3 January 2013, at the age of 81. He was survived by his wife Meenakshi, his daughters M. Narmadha and Latha, and son Suresh.

== Technique ==
Gopalakrishnan had researched playing technique, and developed particular fingering and bowing disciplines of the "Parur style" to produce a clarity of sound and speed of delivery. His style includes one-finger playing and a thematic development on single-string octaves.

Violinist Yehudi Menuhin said of Gopalakrishnan's playing: "I have not heard such violin in all my travels! How superbly this young Indian is playing our instrument". When receiving the Sangeetha Kalanidhi award from the Music Academy of Madras, Gopalakrishnan said: "My practice is the only secret of my success and then the other secret is my father. The practice that I was used to was nearly 15–16 hours a day and that was a very tough one where I used to jump suddenly from Carnatic to Hindustani styles while playing. Anything, any award I receive is just the fruit of my practice".

== Awards ==
Year Title

- 1960 Violin Vadhya Samrat — Bombay Sivananda Ashram, India.
- 1975 Padmashri – Government of India
- 1976 Violin Vadhya Chakravarthy — New York, U.S.A.
- 1978 Kalaimamani – Govt. of Tamil Nadu, India.
- 1979 Kerala Sangeetha Nataka Akademi Award, India.
- 1980 T.Chowdiah award — Karnataka, India.
- 1982 Sangeet Natak Akademi Award, India.
- 1997 Sapathagiri Sangeetha Vidwanmani — Thirupathi Devasthanam, India.
- 1998 Sangeetha Kalanidhi – Madras Music Academy, Chennai, India.
- 2007 Kerala Sangeetha Nataka Akademi Fellowship, India.
- 2012 Padma Bhushan – Government of India
- 2012 Sangeetha Kalasikhamani – The Indian Fine Arts Society, Chennai.
- 2012 Sangeet Natak Akademi Tagore Ratna.
