= Joi Srivastava =

- Born: January 1, 1930; Allahabad
- Died: December 6, 2003 (aged 73)
- Genre: Hindustani classical music
- Occupation: Violinist
- Instrument: Violin
- Years active: 1948-2003

Pt Joi Srivastava was a well-known North Indian violinist of the Senia Gharana.

== Early life and training ==
Joi Srivastava was born in Allahabad on 1 January 1930. He learned Hindustani classical violin from Gagan Chandra Chatterjee, a violinist who is credited with introducing the gat-style of violin playing in North India. After his teacher died, Joi Srivastava learnt from the celebrated Ustad Alauddin Khan as well for a few years.

== Career ==
He was a prodigy who became a master of the instrument even before he turned 20. He started teaching at the University of Allahabad and also at Kala Bharati Allahabad. Around 1957 he moved to Delhi and joined the All India Radio where he was a regular artiste till his retirement in 1987. After that he taught violin at the Gandharva Mahavidyalaya, Delhi till 1994.

=== Music for documentaries ===
- Saarang - the Peacock (features Raag Megh and Raag Vrindavani Saarang played by him on the violin)
- Lime Buildings Breathe (features Raag Dhani, Raag Sindhu Bhairavi and Raag Yamani Bilawal played by him on the violin)

== Style ==
Joi Srivastava pioneered a unique style of playing North Indian Classical music on the violin, playing the full range of music traditionally played on the sitar and sarod, but also introducing techniques of Carnatic Veena and Western classical into his playing.

== Family ==
- Joi Srivastava was married to Sushil Srivastava

Joi Srivastava has three children:-

- Dr.Gunjan.S.Bhatnagar (Eldest daughter)
- Seema Madhusudan(Second daughter)
- Bharat Srivastava (Youngest son)

Joi Srivastava has three grandchildren:-

- Mansa Madhusudan (Daughter of Madhusudan and Seema Madhusudan)
- Mandira Bhatnagar (Daughter of Gunjan Bhatnagar and Rajendra Kumar Bhatnagar)
- Arpit Bhatnagar(Son of Gunjan Bhatnagar and Rajendra Kumar Bhatnagar)

== Students ==
Joi Srivastava was a teacher to many violinists of North India, and also of other countries:

- Kumar Dinesh Deo
- Prakash Narayan of Allahabad
- Guruprasad Sharma of Allahabad
- Patti Weiss
- Anne Marie Ene
- Lenneke van Staalen
- Sharat Chandra Srivastava is his grandson and the leading performer in his style
- Satyanarayan Sharma of Jaipur
- Harvinder Singh (sitar)
- Janardhan Prasad Mishra, Sangeet Samiti, Allahabad.
