= Fayiz Muhammed =

Indian Violinist

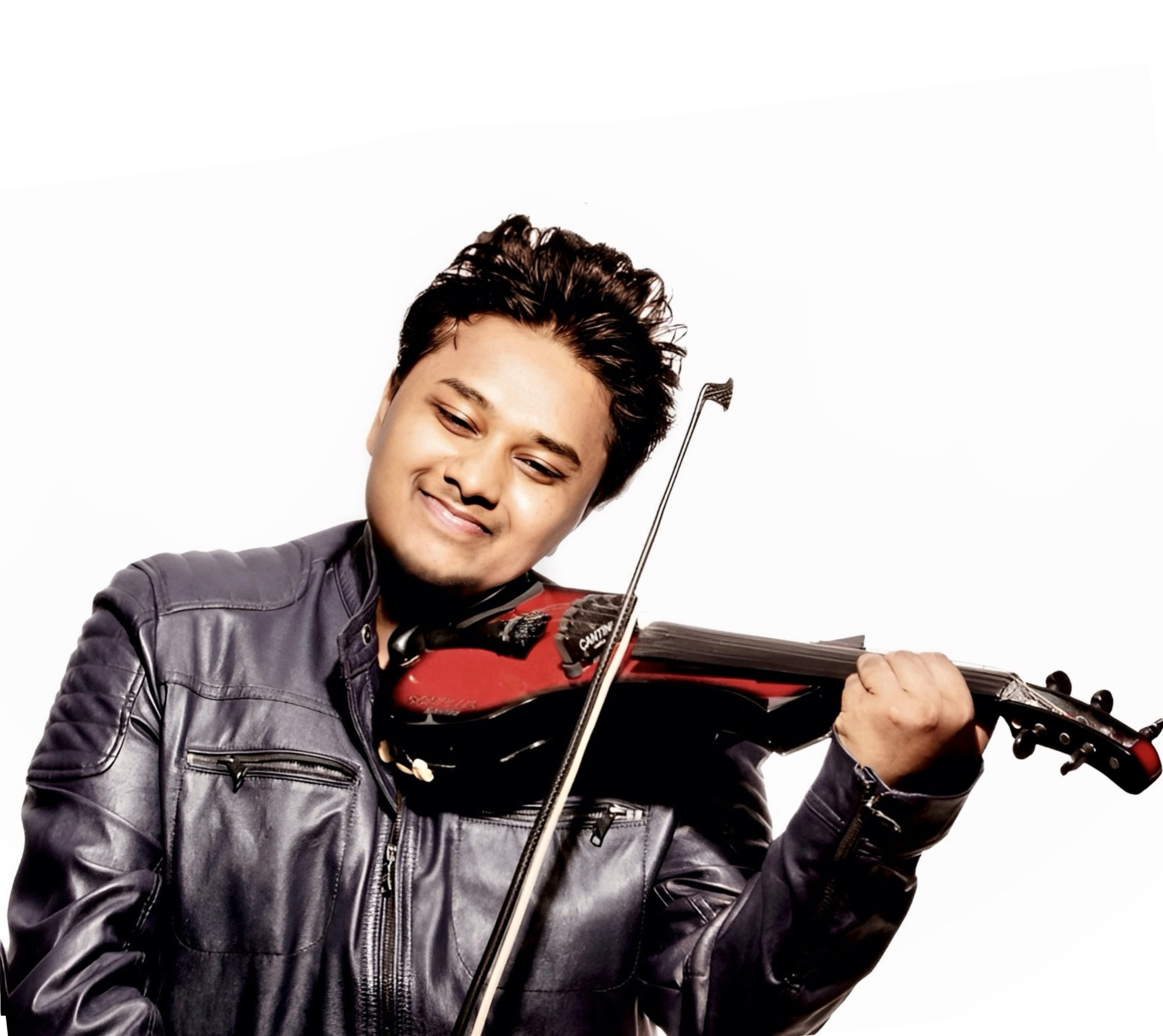
- Fayiz Muhammed performing in studio

Background information
- Born: Faiz Muhammed K.S; Aluva, Kerala, India
- Genres: Classical, Indian, world music, Fusion music, Indian music, Carnatic music
- Occupations: Violinist, composer
- Instrument: Violin
- Years active: 2016–present

Fayiz Muhammed is an Indian violinist from Kochi, Kerala, trained in Carnatic music and Western classical music.

== Early life ==
Fayiz was born in Aluva, Kerala to Saidu Muhammed T M and Shyla Saidu Muhammed. He was introduced to the violin as a child and started taking lessons in Carnatic and Western classical music from Kalabhavan at the age of 14. He did his graduation in Commerce from Union Christian College, Aluva.

== Performing career ==
In 2016, he started a fusion band, Red Viola with eight other musicians while studying in college. The band does fusion covers of popular Indian songs. He has performed musical shows in India and abroad and has collaborated with Vijay Sethupathi, Dhanush, Ranveer Singh and artists Vaishnav Girish and Niranj Suresh at Asiavision Awards in 2019.He also permormed for UAE National Day with Mammootty in Dubai

He was part of a concert arranged at Global Village (Dubai) featuring 44 musicians from different countries.

He composed the theme music for the 19th edition of beauty pageant, Miss Kerala. In 2019, he made a cameo appearance as a violinist in the Malayalam film Pathinettam Padi.
