= Sharat Chandra Srivastava =

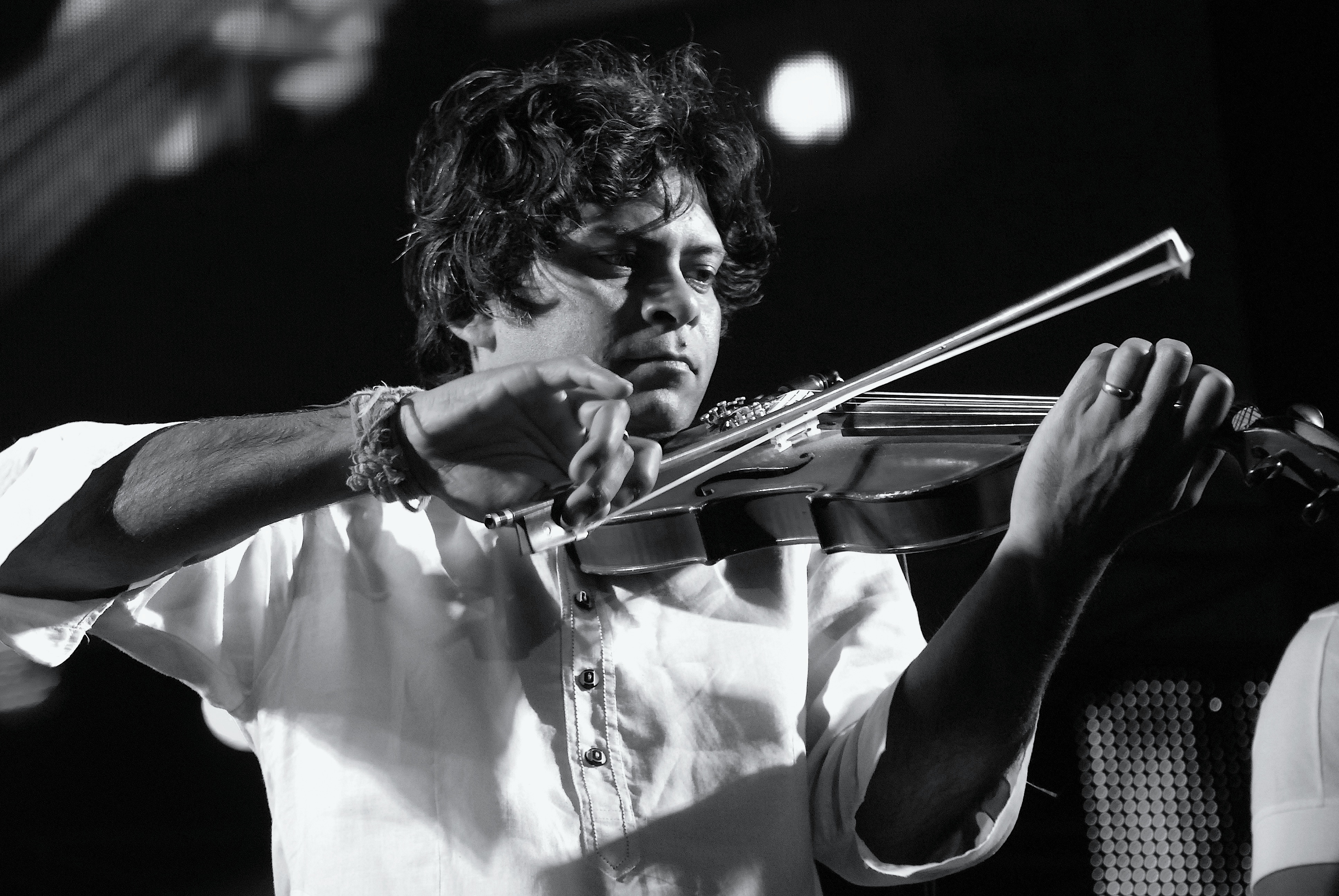

Background information
- Born: 17 October 1971 (age 55); New Delhi
- Genre: Hindustani classical music
- Occupations: Violinist, composer
- Instrument: Violin
- Website: http://www.sharatraag.com

Sharat Chandra Srivastava (born 17 October 1971) is a North Indian classical violinist and music composer. He represents the Senia gharana.

== Early life and training ==
Srivastava was born in New Delhi on 17 October 1971. He started learning violin at the age of 7 from his grandfather, the renowned North Indian violinist Pt Joi Srivastava.

== Career ==
He has been performing Hindustani classical music for over 25 years. He was part of India's premier rock band Parikrama for 12 years. He left Parikrama in 1999 and started the Delhi-based fusion band called Mrigya. He is also a member of the world music quartet India Alba.

He is a recipient of the National Scholarship from the Ministry of Human Resources and Development, Government of India.

In 1998, he performed with Sting in an all acoustic set at the Channel V awards held at New Delhi. He has also performed with Ustad Amjad Ali Khan, Pt. Hari Prasad Chaurasia, Pt. Birju Maharaj and many other stalwarts.

=== As a teacher ===
Sharat has taught Indian classical violin at the Gandharva Mahavidyalaya, New Delhi from 1999 to 2007. He has conducted masterclasses at the University of Edinburgh, Royal Scotland Academy of Music and Drama, University of Stratclythe, Glasgow, Scotland. Additionally, he has conducted workshops in Winterthur University, Switzerland and Casa de la India, Valladolid, Spain.

=== Performance in music festivals ===
- Yuva Mahotsava by Sahitya Kala Parishad
- Little Chilli Festival (London)
- Singapore Arts Festival
- Druga Godba Festival
- Canada National Day (Toronto)
- Edinburgh Fringe Festival
- Dubai Jazz Festival
- Khajuraho Millennium Festival (India)
- The Great Arc Festival
- New Zealand Arts Festival, 2004
- India Meets Spain, 2006
- Tansen Sangeet Samaroh, Gwalior, India (2016)

=== As a composer/conductor ===
- Music composer for the documentary Lime Buildings Breathe by Satyen Wanchoo.
- Music composer for the dance drama Game of Dice by Sadhya
- Music composer for the dance drama Natraj – the Lord of Dance by Sadhya
- Music composer for UNDP's Stand Up, Make Noise programme on 18 September 2010 featuring a 100-piece Indian instrumental orchestra
- Music composer for ICCR website
- Music composer for the dance drama Maharaas by Lokchhanda
- Music composer for the television serial 'Ek Tha Rusty' telecast on Doordarshan National
- Music composer and conductor for the cultural programme of the India Africa Summit 2015 held on 29 October 2015 at Rashtrapati Bhavan, New Delhi
- Music composer for the Jai Hind light and sound show at Red Fort, New Delhi
- Music composer and conductor for the first ever BIMSTEC Traditional Music Festival held at Bharat Mandapam on August 4 2025

=== Strings of the World ===
Sharat is the festival director of Strings of the World — a world music festival dedicated to string instruments. It was held in New Delhi in the month of November from 2012 till 2015, and featured award-winning string players from Norway and Scotland. The fifth edition of Strings of the World was held at NCPA in Mumbai in October 2019

=== Discography ===
- Reels and Ragas, India Alba
- High Beyond, India Alba
- East Blends West, Various artists, Virgin Music India, 2011
- No Passport Control, Perseverance Records, 2021
- Bandhutva, Krintan Records, 2026

=== Collaborations with other musicians ===
- Igor Bezget
- Trondheim Soloists
- Vinnie Colaiuta (on the track 'No Passport Control')

== Style ==
Sharat's training under his guru/grandfather, the renowned violinist Pandit Joi Srivastava, has made him proficient in the 'Dhrupad-Ang', a style unique to this Gharana under the Guru-Shishya Parampara.

== Awards and nominations ==
- Nomination for best music debut at GIMA Music Awards 2012
- Silver medal for outstanding achievement in jazz/fusion at Global Music Awards 2026 (along with Dennis Dreith)

== Interviews ==
- Washington Bangla Radio, 06/12/2012
- Rolling Stone India, 26/08/2026
