= Gagan Chandra Chatterjee =

- Born: 1890; Allahabad
- Died: 1949 (aged 58–59)
- Genres: hindustani classical music
- Occupation: Violinist
- Instrument: Violin

Gagan Chandra Chatterjee was a North Indian classical violinist of the Senia Gharana who is known for inventing the gatkari style of North Indian classical violin.

== Early life and training ==
Gagan Chandra Chatterjee was born in Allahabad in 1890. He learned Hindustani classical music on the sarod from the Senia gharana master Ustad Keramatullah Khan. However, he chose a different instrument for expressing the music he learned. He could accurately play the gatkari styles of sitar and sarod on the violin and spent the rest of his life with this instrument. He also learned from Lachhmandas Munimji, a well-known harmonium player, and Pran Krishna Chattopadhyay, a well-known dhrupad singer.

== Career ==
Gagan Chandra Chatterjee played extensively in music conferences of his time. He recorded a few classical tracks accompanied by piano, where he is credited as 'G.C. Chatterjee'.

== Style ==
Prior to him, Hindustani classical violinists used to play by mimicking vocal Hindustani classical music. However, Hindustani classical music uses many techniques that are unique to sitar and sarod. Gagan Chandra Chatterjee was the first person to bring those techniques over to the violin. He would play the complete alaap-jor-jhala of Hindustani classical music, which, before him, was heard only on sitar and sarod.

== Students ==
Although Gagan Chandra Chatterjee inspired many musicians across instruments, he did not leave behind many students. His most well-known students were Sriram Srivastava and his younger brother Joi Srivastava.
