= Mrigya =

- Origin: New Delhi, India
- Genres: World music, Fusion music, Hindustani classical music
- Years active: 1999—present
- Labels: Virgin/EMI Records; Times Music
- Members: Sharat Chandra Srivastava: violin Gyan Singh: Tabla; Karan Sharma: guitar Indraneel Hariharan: bass guitar Sacchin Kapoor: keyboards Rajat Kakkar: drums Sukriti Sen: Hindustani classical vocals Jagtinder Singh Sidhu: Sufi vocals
- Past members: Sachin Gupta; Sonam Sherpa
- Website: www.mrigya.com

Mrigya is an Indian World fusion music band from New Delhi that was formed in 1999. It music is a fusion of Blues, Folk, Funk, Latin, Rock and Jazz along with Indian classical music. Over the years the band has played at national and international music festivals.

== History ==
The band was initially formed as a jam band project for a music club called "Friends of Music" and was originally christened "Mrigaya" (Sanskrit for "hunt") by Indraneel Hariharan. A misprint in the promotion flyer named the newly formed outfit as "Mrigya". The band decided to retain this new name born out of that amusing incident.

== Band members ==
The founding members consisted of Rajat Kakkar on percussions (and, later, on drums), Sharat Chandra Srivastava on Hindustani violin, Indraneel Hariharan on electric bass, Sonam Sherpa on electric guitar, Gyan Singh on tabla and Indian percussion, and Ashwani Verma on drums.

The current band-members are as follows:

- Sharat Chandra Srivastava: violin
- Karan Sharma: guitar
- Indraneel Hariharan: bass guitar
- Sacchin Kapoor: keyboards
- Gyan Singh: tabla
- Rajat Kakkar: drums
- Sukriti Sen: Hindustani classical vocals
- Jagtinder Singh Sidhu: Sufi vocals

== Discography ==
- World Harmony, Virgin/EMI Records 2010
- Mrigya, Times Music 2015

== Major International performances ==
- Southbank Centre, London - 2001
- Edinburgh Fringe Festival - 2001 and 2002
- Dubai Jazz Festival - 2003
- New Zealand Arts Festival - 2004
- Singapore Kalautsavam - 2004
- Jazz by the lake, Johannesburg - 2007 and 2010
- The Bassline, Johannesburg - 2007
- ICC Arena, Durban - 2007
- Blue Lagoon, Durban - 2007
- Jazz Club, Durban - 2007
- Artscape, Cape Town - 2007
- V & A Waterfront, Cape Town - 2007
- Pretoria University - 2007, 2010
- City Hall, Durban - 2010
- Gandhi Hall, Lenasia - 2010
- Bolshoi Theatre, Moscow - 2009
- Rimsky-Korsakov Conservatory, St. Petersburg - 2009
- Indian high Commission, Berlin - 2007
- UFA Fabrik, Berlin - 2007
- Beit Schmuel Hall, Jerusalem - 2011
- Reading 3, Tel Aviv - 2011
- Gwanghwamun Plaza, Seoul - 2011
- Busan International Rock Festival - 2011
- Vancouver Folk Festival - 2012
- Square roots festival, Chicago - 2012
- Bibliotheca Alexandrina, Alexandria - 2013

== Awards ==
- Herald Angel Award, Scotland, 2002
- Tap Water Award, Scotland, 2002
- Artists for Change Karmaveer Puraskaar, India, 2012
