= Nandini Muthuswamy =

- Origin: Southern India
- Genres: Carnatic music & Global Fusion
- Occupation: Violinist
- Instrument: Violin

Nandini Muthuswamy is a Carnatic violinist from South India. Her Guru-shishya tradition or musical lineage traces back to Saint Tyāgarāja, Śri Muttusvāmi Dikśitar, Śri Śyāma Śāstri and to Śri Bālusvāmi Dikśitar, who was responsible for introducing the violin into Carnatic music.

Awards

- Gold medal awarded by Shri Shankaracharya Swamigal of Kanchi Kamakoti Peetham for winning the State Violin Competition.
- SAI GANA MANI awarded by the Sai Spiritual Centre, Chennai
- YUVA KALA BHARATI awarded by the Bharat Kalachar, Chennai.
- INNISAI GNANA KALA MANIGAL awarded by Sri Kalikambal Kamadesvarar Devasthanam.
- MOST TALENTED ARTISTES OF 1991 by Mohanam.
- Awarded the TAMBURA PRIZE for the BEST CONCERT of the MUsic Season, by the Indian Fine Arts Society, Chennai.
- NADA VINIDINI awarded by the Sri Ranjani Trust, Chennai.
- RAJAMANIKKAM PILLAI CENTENARY AWARD for EXCELLENCE IN VIOLIN PLAYING awarded by Sri Ragam Fine Arts.
- BHARATHA VIOLIN VADYA TILAKANGAL conferred by Sathguru Sri Santhananda Swamigal.
- BEST SENIOR VIOLINIST AWAD from the Music Academy, Chennai.
- BEST SENIOR VIOLINIST AWARD from the Indian Fine Arts Society, Chennai.
- BHUVANA SANGEETHA PRAVAHINI by Chennai Om Sri Skandasramam in recognition of the valuable services rendered to the cause of Music.
- SHRI VIDYA TAPASVI awarded by Yuvakeerthana Trust & Tapas Academy.
- ASTHANA VIDVAN of Pudukkottai Shri Bhuvaneshwari Peetham.
- TNJRF Award for the Outstanding Female Researcher, by the Govt. of Tamil Nadu, India.
- CWIT Award for Performing Arts, UK.
