= T. M. Krishna =

Carnatic Vocalist

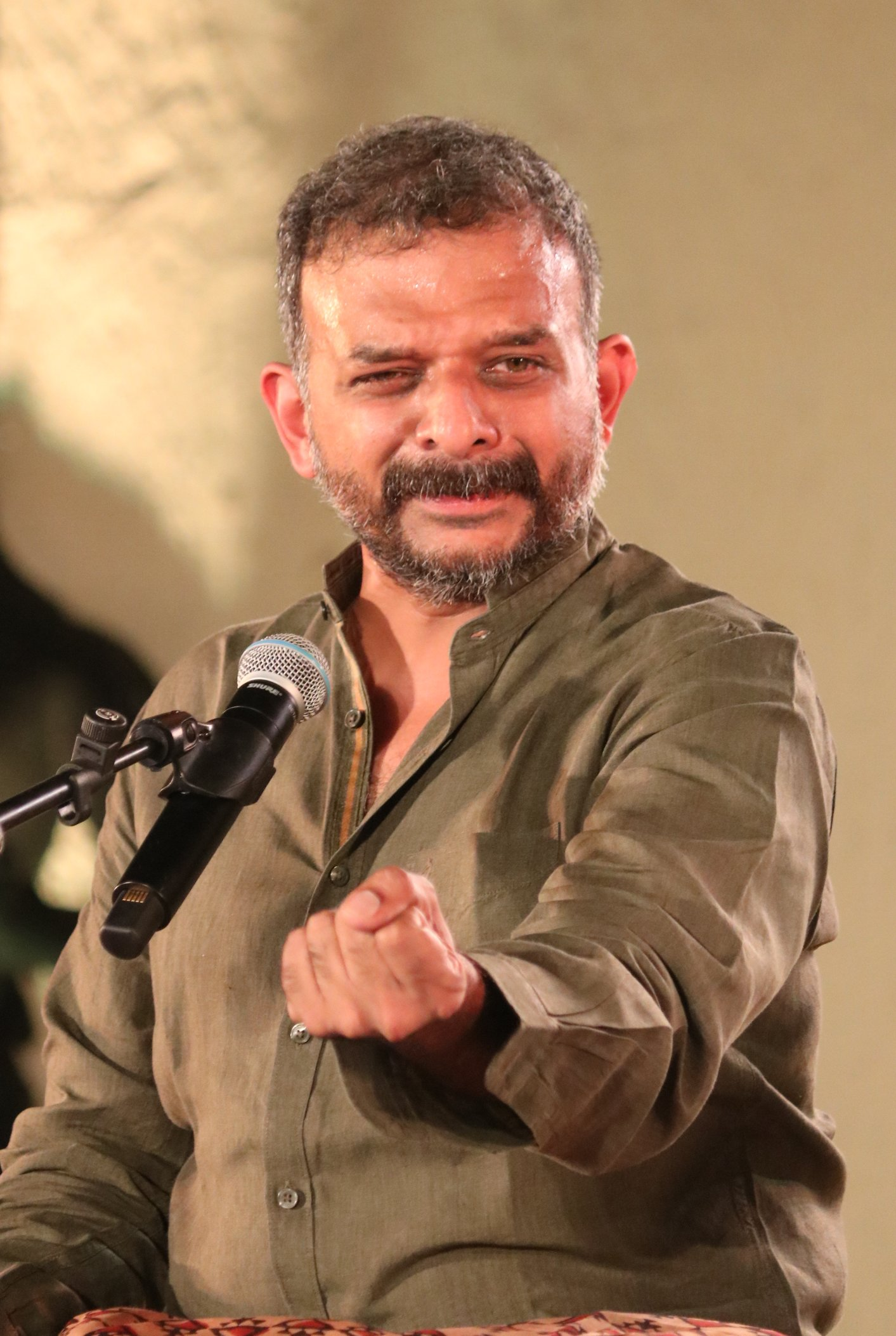
- T. M. Krishna at Kollam, Kerala, 2021

Background information
- Also known as: TMK
- Born: 22 January 1976 (age 50); Madras (now Chennai), Tamil Nadu, India
- Genre: Carnatic classical
- Occupations: Singer, Lecturer, Author, Activist, Writer
- Years active: 1988–present
- Website: tmkrishna.com

Thodur Madabusi Krishna (born 22 January 1976) is an Indian Carnatic vocalist, writer, activist, author and Ramon Magsaysay awardee.

In the year 2016 he was awarded with the Ramon Magsaysay Award for "his forceful commitment as artist and advocate to art's power to heal India's deep social divisions, breaking barriers of caste and class to unleash what music has to offer not just for some but for all". As a vocalist, he has made numerous innovations in both the style and substance of his concerts, which has drawn controversy from some quarters.

Krishna was conferred the Sangita Kalanidhi award for 2024 by the Madras Music Academy.

== Background and personal life ==
Krishna was born in Madras (now Chennai) on 22 January 1976, the son of T. M. Rangachari and his wife Prema Rangachari. His mother and maternal uncle Dr. Sriram Subramaniam founded and ran a school named Vidya Vanam for tribal and underprivileged students in Anaikatti, Tamil Nadu. Krishna is the grand nephew of Congress politician and freedom fighter T. T. Krishnamachari (former Indian finance minister and industrialist), who was also one of the founding members of the Madras Music Academy.

Krishna is an alumnus of The School (Krishnamurti Foundation of India), Chennai. Krishna received his B.A. degree in economics from Vivekananda College, University of Madras. He is married to Sangeetha Sivakumar, a reputed carnatic musician and they have two daughters.

== Career ==
T. M. Krishna sings at Kollam, Kerala, 2021

Both of Krishna's parents had deep interest in the arts, especially Carnatic music. His mother had received music lessons in her childhood in the typical south Indian style, and had even taken a degree in Carnatic Music. Krishna's parents ensured that he received exposure to the classical arts from a young age. They arranged for him to receive music lessons from a very young age. Krishna began his musical training under Bhagavathula Seetharama Sharma. He later underwent special Ragam Thanam Pallavi grooming under Chingleput Ranganathan and Semmangudi Srinivasa Iyer.

Krishna's performing career began at the age of 12 with his debut concert at the Spirit of Youth series organised by the Music Academy, Chennai (India). He has since performed widely at various festivals and venues across the world, including the Madras Music Academy, National Centre for the Performing Arts (India), John F. Kennedy Center for the Performing Arts, Lincoln Center for the Performing Arts, Esplanade – Theatres on the Bay, to name a few.

His music is often appraised as being soulful and full of 'raga bhava'. Among his many renditions, some of the most popular among his listeners include 'Jambupathe' in Yamunakalyani and 'Manavinala' in Nalinakanthi. His music during the last decade was reputed for his powerful, deep voice and his ability to sing rapid swaras in many rare ragas. He now shows a focus on Neraval, an improvisational form which he believes has been distorted over the ages. He is also famous for his 'innovations' in the method he presents his concerts, one of the primary issues that purists have being that he renders varnams (traditionally introductory pieces) in the middle of a concert. He is also working towards a project in which Dikshithar compositions from the Sangeetha Sampradaya Pradarshini are rendered exactly according to their notation in the book.

Krishna speaks and writes about a wide range of issues, not confined to the cultural sphere. His interests span the breadth of leftwing activism, be it the environment, the caste system, social reform, religious reform, combating communalism, innovation in classical music and so on. He has started and is involved in many organizations whose work is spread across the spectrum of music and culture. Recently, he has spoken out against the revocation of Article 370, and the destruction of statues of Lenin, Ambedkar, Gandhi and Periyar.

Krishna is part of the team of activists that organizes the Urur-Olcott Kuppam Festival in Chennai and the Svanubhava initiative in Chennai. He has been part of inspiring collaborations, such as the Chennai Poromboke Paadal with environmentalist Nityanand Jayaraman. He has collaborated for performances with the Jogappas (transgender musicians) and has brought on to the concert stage the poetry of Perumal Murugan. He also speaks in various conferences and academic institutions, including Harvard University, Chennai Mathematical Institute, the Indian Institutes of Technology, and the Indian Institutes of Management.

Among his awards are the prestigious Ramon Magsaysay Award (2016) in recognition of ‘his forceful commitment as artist and advocate to art’s power to heal India’s deep social divisions’, the Indira Gandhi Award for National Integration (2017) for his services in promoting and preserving national integration in the country, and the Professor V. Aravindakshan Memorial Award (2017) for connecting Carnatic music with the common man.

The song 'Venpura' of the movie Gypsy (2019 film) directed by Raju Murugan is Krishna's first playback song. Santhosh Narayanan is the music director.

=== Books ===
- Voices Within (2007). Coffee table book on Carnatic Music by Bombay Jayashri, T. M. Krishna, and Mythili Chandrasekhar. The book was translated in Tamil and published by Ananda Vikatan Publications in 2011.
- A Southern Music: The Carnatic Story (2013, ISBN 9789350298213, paperback 2016, ISBN 9789351777403, paperback 2017, ISBN 9789352645237). The book was awarded the 2014 Tata Literature Award for Best First Book in the non-fiction category.
- MS Understood (2017). This long-form essay was featured in The Caravan Book of Profiles (2017, ISBN 9780143428152) by Penguin as one of their "twelve definitive profiles". The essay was published in Tamil as Katrinile Karainda Tuyar by Kalachuvadu Publications in 2018.
- Reshaping Art (2018). Published by Aleph Book Company.
- Ashis Nandy: A Life in Dissent (2018). Krishna contributed one chapter to this book about Indian sociologist Ashis Nandy.
- Sebastian and Sons: A Brief History of Mrdangam Makers (2020, ISBN 9789389152180, paperback 2022, ISBN 9789395073585)
- The Spirit of Enquiry: Notes of Dissent (2021, ISBN 9780670095803)
- We, the People of India: Decoding a Nation's Symbols (2026, ISBN 9789371973069)

=== Articles and lectures ===
Krishna also frequently writes on topics ranging from music (including its practice, musicians, history and future) to society, culture, politics and religion. His articles have been published across most leading Indian newspapers and magazines such as The Indian Express, The Hindu, The Hindustan Times, Outlook, India Today, and Open, as well as several online portals such as Scroll, The Wire, DailyO, and Firstpost. Krishna has also delivered lectures at a variety of institutions, including leading universities across the world. Noteworthy among these lectures are:

- Art Politics and Society (2020) https://www.youtube.com/watch?v=veH0rBkyOLo Tata Literature Live
- Neelan Tiruchelvam Memorial Lecture (2018)
- AK Ramanujan Lecture (2018)
- Professor Ram Bapat Memorial Lecture (2017)
- Dr. Ashok Da Ranade Memorial Lecture (2016)
- Kumar Gandharva Memorial Lecture (2014)

In 2016, along with Gita Jayaraj, Dr A. Mangai, S. Nandagopal, and Baradwaj Rangan, Krishna taught a semester long course called Indian Art in Context at Chennai Mathematical Institute.

=== Initiatives and collaborations ===
Chennai Poromboke Paadal

The Chennai Poromboke Paadal music video was released on 14 January 2017 on YouTube. An initiative by T. M. Krishna and environmental activist Nityanand Jayaraman - the Tamil song was written by Kaber Vasuki and composed by R. K. Shriramkumar, and the video was directed by Rathindran Prasad. The video featured Krishna performing in and around the Ennore creek and highlighted the environmental damage done to the creek by the power plant in that region, Ennore Thermal Power Station. The music video trended on YouTube India for a week after its release becoming the first Carnatic song to trend on YouTube. The song's title contained the word "Poromboke" which formerly meant land of the commons but has become a popular swear word. The music video also garnered attention for combining Tamil slang dialect with carnatic music. The song is a raga-malika and is based on the ragas Anandabhairavi, Begada, Hamir Kalyani, Devagandhari, Salagabhairavi and Sindhubhairavi.

Kodaikanal Still Won't

Krishna collaborated with rap and gaana kuthu artists in this multi-genre music video in protest of multinational Unilever's double standards and its refusal to apply the globally accepted environmental standards in India. Directed by film maker Rathindra Prasad, this was a second video after the original Kodaikanal Won't video which protested Unilever's 2001 dumping of toxic mercury in the South Indian hill town of Kodaikanal, which is said to have poisoned its workers and the forest.

Chennai Kalai Theru Vizha (formerly Urur Olcott Kuppam Vizha)

Krishna was part of the team that started this festival with an aim to heal art, and help art heal by opening art and artists to new audiences and different environments. The festival made its debut in January 2015 at Urur-Olcott Kuppam in Chennai. In 2016, it was designed also as a celebration to help relieve some of the trauma suffered by people hurt by the 2015 floods, and as a thanksgiving to the many who assisted with relief, rescue and rehabilitation efforts. Today, the Urur Olcott Kuppam Vizha is now Chennai Kalai Theruvizha, a new avatar that will begin exploring new locations around the city in collaboration with local communities.

== Activism ==
T. M. Krishna speaks in Jay Kisan image exhibition at Kollam, 2021

T. M. Krishna is an activist against caste discrimination. He also advocates for environmental activism and LGBTQ+ rights. He received media spotlight when he boycotted the Chennai Music Season citing caste favouritism in the Carnatic Music system. He was involved with various organisations to bring Carnatic Music across the rural areas and to support underprivileged artists.

== Political views ==
He has been a strong critic of the Bharatiya Janata Party (BJP) and the Sangh Parivar. He accused them of launching an unrelenting offense of hate and violence against minorities, their cultures, identities and their rights as India's equal citizens. He also alleged that they have made people believe that Hindus are under threat and have made mostly Muslims and Dalits as their main targets. In August 2018, Krishna received threats from right-wing groups after he sang Christmas hymns. He announced that he would release one Carnatic song about Jesus and Allah every month.

In April 2019, he asked the people of Kerala to vote wisely and not to believe in the alleged misinformation propagated by the BJP that Hinduism is not safe in Kerala.

Krishna is a critic of Israeli policy. In 2022, Krishna signed onto the Musicians For Palestine pledge, refusing to perform in Israel following the 2021 Israel–Palestine crisis.
