= A Southern Music: The Karnatik Story =

- Author: T. M. Krishna
- Publisher: HarperCollins
- Publication date: 2013

A Southern Music: The Karnatik Story is a 2013 book authored by renowned musician T. M. Krishna.

The book delineates the story of Carnatic music starting from its origins to its influence on socio-political strictures of the society. It also deals with the subject of gender, caste and class issues in the Carnatic music fraternity in South India in general and Madras specifically.

It takes a scientific approach on explaining the basis of raga formation and their impact on human senses. It highlights the differences between Hindustani Classical and Carnatic classical music forms.
