= Malaikkottai Govindaswamy Pillai =

Indian musician

Malaikkottai Govindaswamy Pillai (1878–1931) was a noted exponent of violin in the Carnatic music system who lived in South India.

== Early life ==
Born at Achyuthamangalam on the banks of river Mudicondan in Thanjavur District, Govindaswami Pillai had his initial training in vocal and violin under Umayalpuram Panchapakesa Ayyar and later under Ettayapuram Kothandapani Bhagavathar, brother of the renowned Ramachandra Bhagavathar.

Renowned for his vibrant playing style, Govindaswami Pillai could also play the flute and the mridangam. His graceful touches, his polished play, the sweetness and purity of his notes, his superb rendering of kritis, his exquisite finish and the ease and freedom in all the three octaves and the three degrees of speed, made him a great violinist of his times. According to the musicologist Prof. P. Sambamurthi:

'Govindaswami Pillai had an innate artistic consciousness and looked both to the intellectual and the emotional aspects of music.'

Pillai's playing style was characterised by sheer brilliance and originality. He brought in the innovation of a full bowing technique. Like vainikas, he used to sing to the tune of his violin play. Govindaswami Pillai's violin play is also marked by his brilliant alapanas and kalpana swaras and he had mastered the technique of tana playing by the undulatory movement of the bow.

His period coincided with the later part of the life of the legendary Tirokodikaval Krishna Ayyar. Papa Venkataramayya was among his important disciples.
