= Tirukkodikaval Krishna Iyer =

- Born: 1857; Marathurai (near Pandanallur), Tamil Nadu, India
- Died: 1913; Tirukkodikaval, Tamil Nadu, India

Tirukodikaval Krishna Iyer was a Carnatic violinist in the latter half of the 19th century.

== Early years ==
Krishna Iyer had his training first from his father Kuppuswamy Iyer, and later under Kottavasal Venkatarama Iyer, a composer of Tana Varnams. Krishna Iyer inherited his musical talents from his father Kuppuswamy Bhagavatar, a Harikatha performer. He did not have a good voice and so he was persuaded to take up violin playing. He, along with Veena Dhanammal and nagaswaram vidwan Tirupamburam Nataraja Sundaram Pillai, also studied under Sathanoor Panju Iyer of the sishya parampara of Muthuswami Dikshitar.

== Musical experiences ==
His violin recitals were marked with masterly touches, full of masculine grandeur. A prodigy, he could play complicated pieces on a single string. Known for his hard work, he was responsible for ushering in many new techniques to the art of violin playing. He could produce ascending and descending glides (Jarus) with remarkable effect. His was a musician among peers that included Maha Vaidyanatha Iyer, Patnam Subramania Iyer and Sarabha Sastri. His stature and musicianship were such that he could dominate the performance while being an accompanist. He had an awe inspiring and intimidating stature among the musicians of his day.

He is said to have developed a bowing style and fingering technique suitable for Carnatic music. Despite being a successful concert musician and a sought accompanist, it is said that he would practice (Saadhakam) for four hours every morning. The routine is said to have included the "sarali varisais", beginning with fast bowing and ending with very slow bowing. This ensured control over the bow specifically and mastery over the instrument generally. Four Varnams viz., Kalyani & Bhairavi Ata Thaala Varnams and Saveri & Begada Adhi Thaala Varnams were also part of this rigorous practice schedule.

== Government service ==
Krishna Iyer was also functioning as the village administrative officer (then known as Pattamaniar) of Tirukodikaval. Citing his musical career as coming in his way of discharging his official routines, the then revenue authorities removed him from that post. Krishna Iyer's appeals to the then Board of Revenue to reconsider the orders was not obliged by the Government. Krishna Iyer even produced evidence that the Government was fully aware of his musical profession and that he was requested to perform his violin recital before His Excellency the then Governor of Madras during his camp at Vallam in Tanjore District. Subsequently one of his sons, T K Srinivasa Iyer, was appointed as the village administrative officer.

== Trivia ==
A concert was held during a wedding ceremony. Konerirajapuram Vaidyanatha Ayyar was the singer and Krishna Iyer accompanied him on the violin. Kumbakonam Azhaganambi played mridangam while Pudukottai Dakshinamurthy Pillai played Ganjira and Umaiyalpuram Sundaram played the Ghatam. Ariyakudi Ramanuja Iyengar, who was a young boy then, was present with his father. He was asked to perform after the main event. The boy was shy and sat in a corner of the stage. Krishna Iyer looked at the boy and said "Come forward". That was like a blessing for the boy and Krishna Iyer's words became true as Ariyakudi Ramanuja Iyengar became a famous Carnatic musician later.

== Disciples ==
Nadaswaram genius T N Rajarathnam Pillai learned vocal music from him. Thiruvalangadu Sundaresa Iyer was one of his disciples. Semmangudi Narayanaswamy Iyer, Thirukodikaval Ramaswamy Iyer were his disciples. Semmangudi Srinivasa Iyer is his nephew. Valadi Krishnaiyer took training from him.
