= M. Narmadha =

Indian violinist

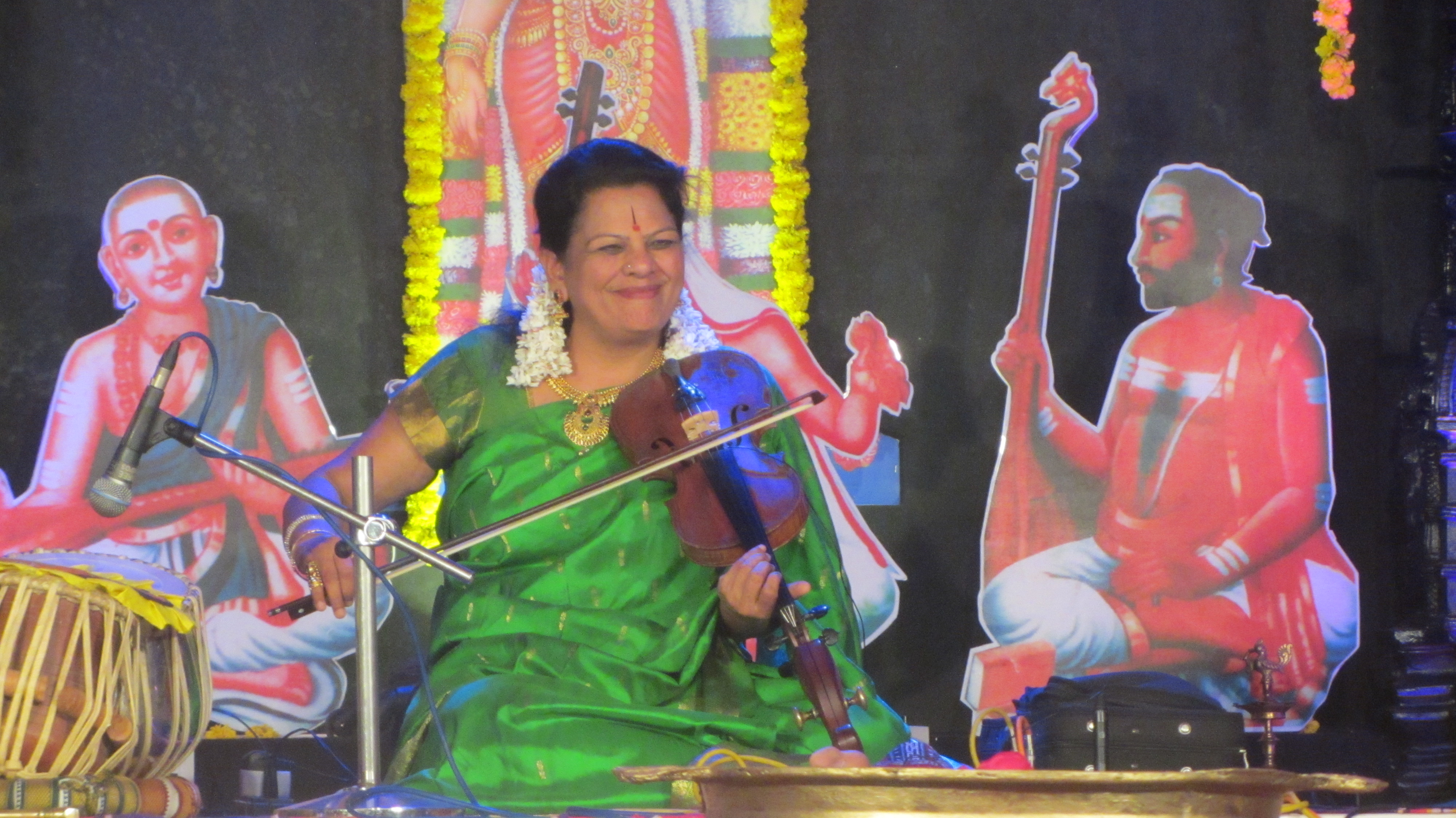

Dr.M.Narmadha is a violinist who performs solo violin concerts of Indian Music.
