= R. K. Shriramkumar =

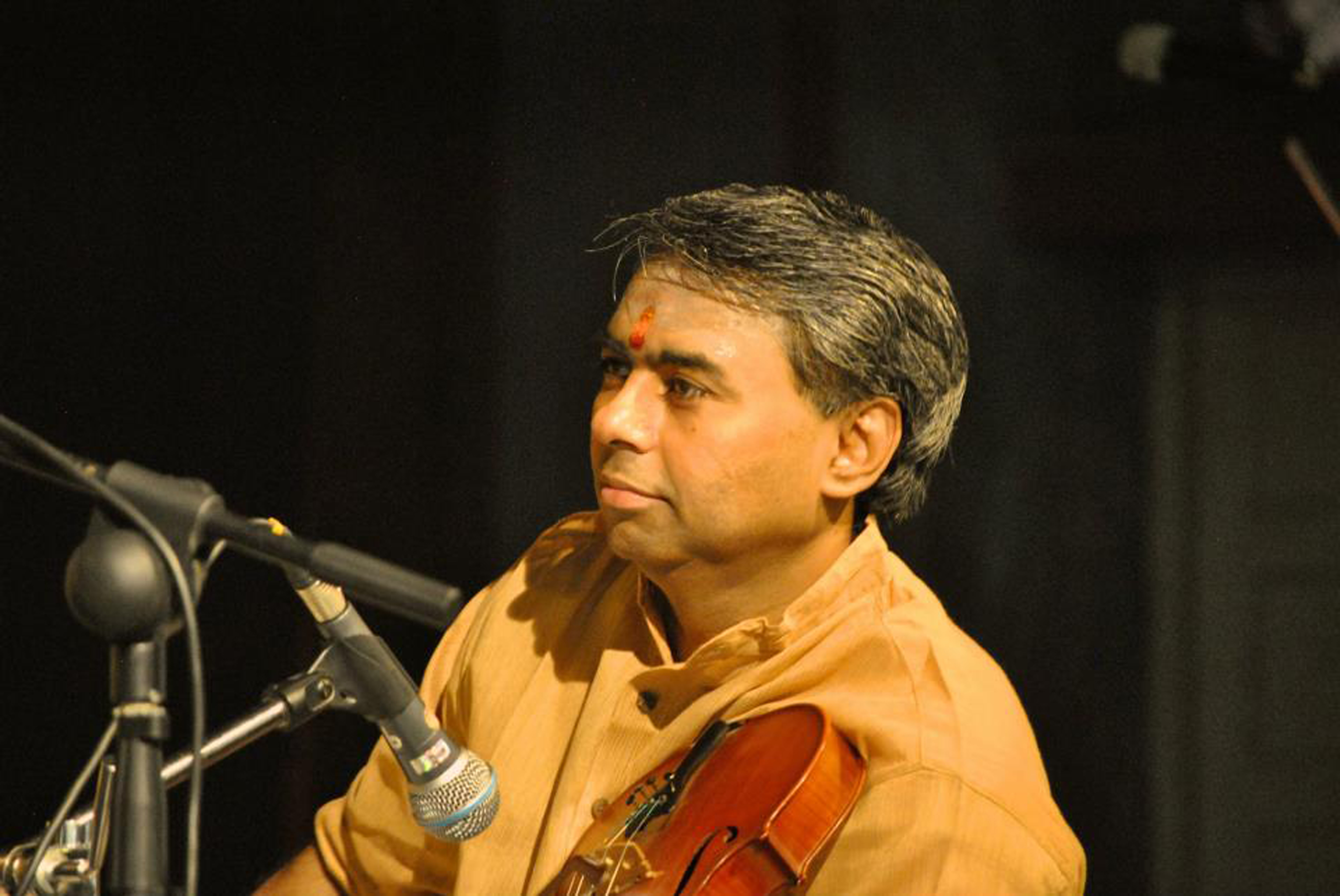
- R. K. Shriramkumar is a prominent violinist of Carnatic music

Background information
- Born: 4 October 1966; Chennai, Tamil Nadu
- Genre: Carnatic
- Occupations: Musician, singer
- Instrument: Violin
- Years active: 1983–present
- Website: www.rkshriramkumar.org

R. K. Shriramkumar (born 4 October 1966) is a virtuoso violinist and accompanist of the Carnatic Music (South Indian classical music). He hails from the Rudrapatna family of musicians from Karnataka. He is the grandson of the violinist R. K. Venkatarama Shastri and grand-nephew of R. K. Srikanthan. R. K. Shriramkumar is chosen for the Sangita Kalanidhi award for the year 2025.

== Introduction ==
Rudrapatna Krishnamurthy Shriramkumar was born on 4 October 1966, to Kusuma Krishnamurthy and R. V. Krishnamurthy. His grandfather was the violinist R. K. Venkatarama Shastri, the brother and guru of R. K. Srikantan. He received his initial training from Savitri Satyamurthy and advanced tutelage under his grandfather, R. K. Venkatarama Shastri. He also trained in Vocal Music under D. K. Jayaraman and presently receives guidance from V.V. Subrahmanyam.

Shriramkumar attended the Padma Seshadri Bala Bhavan school in Chennai, Tamil Nadu.

== Personal life ==
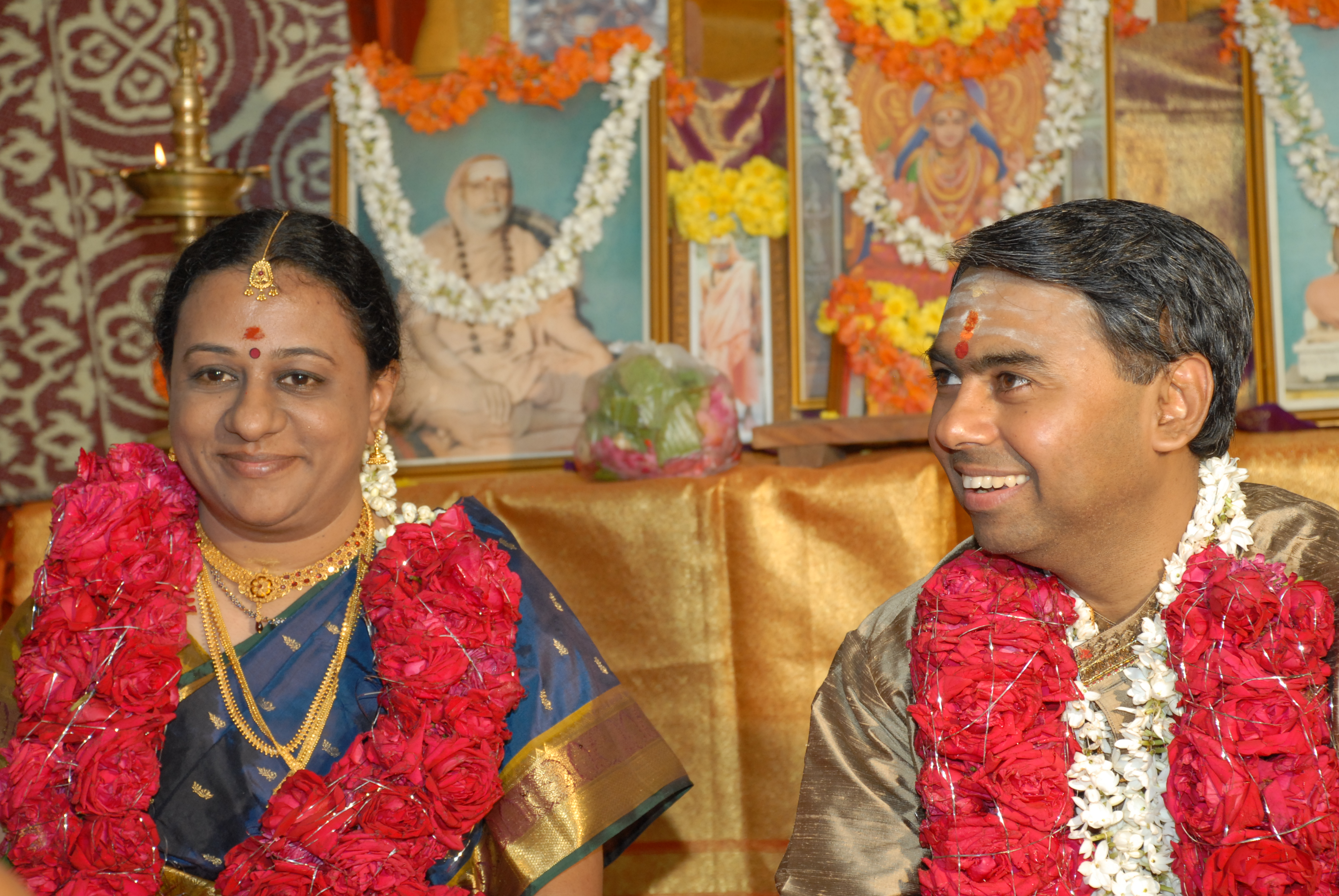
Shriramkumar with his wife, Akila

Shriramkumar is a graduate in Mathematics from the Madras University. He teaches both violin and carnatic vocal music in Chennai, Tamil Nadu. He frequents many concerts in his free time and travels the world on a yearly basis for many prominent artists. He also considers both D. K. Pattammal and M. S. Subbulakshmi as his Gurus. In February 2009, Shriramkumar married Akila.
