= Saraswati veena =

Plucked string instrument from India

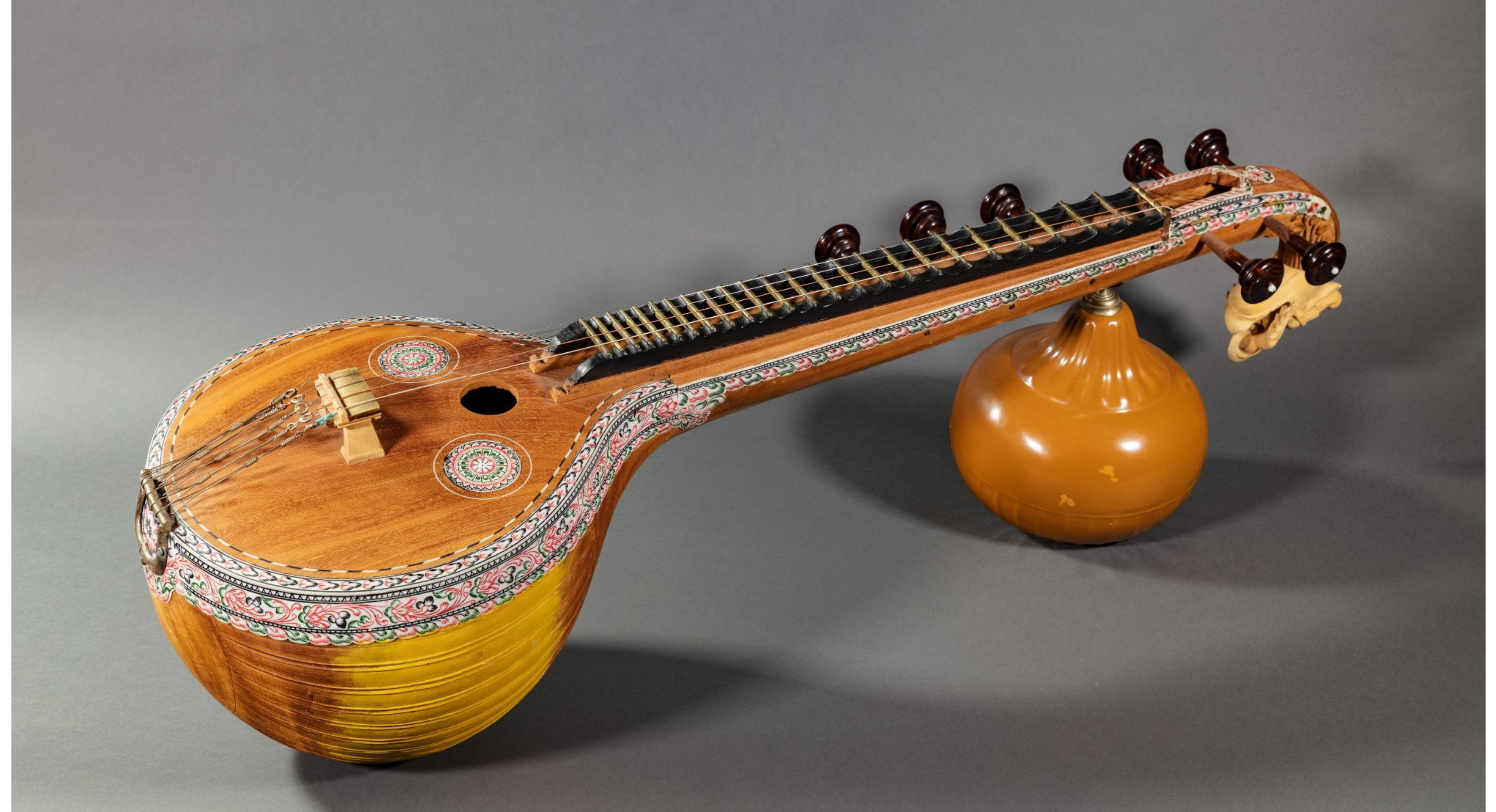
- Sarasvati veena

String instrument
- Classification: string

Musicians
- Veenai Dhanammal, S. Balachander, Chitti Babu, Kalpakam Swaminathan, E. Gayathri, Jayanthi Kumaresh, Rajhesh Vaidhya, Punya Srinivas

Sound sample
- Veena Kinhal, song Haratanaya Sree, from the album '"Tribute to Veena Raja Rao"

More articles or information
- Rudra veena, Vichitra veena, Chitra veena

The Sarasvatī vīṇa (also spelled Saraswati veena) (Telugu: సరస్వతి వీణ, Kannada: ಸರಸ್ವತಿ ವೀಣೆ, Tamil: சரஸ்வதி வீணை, Malayalam: സരസ്വതി വീണ) is an ancient Indian plucked veena. It is named after the Hindu goddess Saraswati, who is usually depicted holding or playing the instrument. Also known as raghunatha veena, it is used mostly in Carnatic Indian classical music. There are several variations of the veena, which in its South Indian form is a member of the lute family. One who plays the veena is referred to as a vaiṇika.

The Saraswati veena is one of 4 major types of veena today. The others include chitra veena, vichitra veena and rudra veena. Out of these the rudra and vichitra veenas are used more often in Hindustani music, while the Saraswati veena and the chitra veena are used more frequently in the Carnatic music of South India. They can be used to play either traditional music or contemporary music.

== History ==
The veena has a recorded history that dates back to approximately 1700 BCE. In ancient times, the tone vibrating from the hunter's bow string when he shot an arrow was known as the Vil Yazh. The Jya ghosha (musical sound of the bow string) is referred to in the ancient Atharvaveda. Eventually, the archer's bow paved the way for the musical bow. Twisted bark, strands of grass and grass root, vegetable fibre and animal gut were used to create the first strings. Over the veena's evolution and modifications, more particular names were used to help distinguish the instruments that followed. The word veena in India was a term originally used to generally denote "stringed instrument", and included many variations that would be either plucked, bowed or struck for sound.

The veena instruments developed much like a tree, branching out into instruments as diverse as the harp-like Akasa (a veena that was tied up in the tops of trees for the strings to vibrate from the currents of wind) and the Audumbari veena (played as an accompaniment by the wives of Vedic priests as they chanted during ceremonial Yajnas). Veenas ranged from one string to one hundred and were composed of many different materials like eagle bone, bamboo, wood, and coconut shells. The yazh was an ancient harp-like instrument that was also considered a veena. But with the developments of the fretted veena instruments, the yazh quickly faded away, as the fretted veena allowed for the easy performance of ragas and the myriad subtle nuances and pitch oscillations in the gamakas prevalent in the Indian musical system. As is seen in many Hindu temple sculptures and paintings, the early veenas were played vertically. It was not until the great Indian Carnatic music composer and Saraswati veena player Muthuswami Dikshitar that it began to be popularized as played horizontally.

According to musicologist P. Sambamurthy, "The current form of the Saraswati veena with 24 fixed frets evolved in Thanjavur, Tamil Nadu, during the reign of Raghunatha Nayak and it is for this reason sometimes called the Tanjore veena or the Raghunatha veena. The Saraswati veena contains 4 strings. It is said Govinda Dikshita father of Venkatamukhin, who was a musician and a minister in the court of Raghunatha Nayaka designed it. Prior to his time, the number of frets on the veena was less and also movable." The Saraswati veena developed from Kinnari veena. Made in several regions in South India, those made by makers from Thanjavur in the South Indian state of Tamil Nadu are to date considered the most sophisticated. However, the purest natural sound is extracted by plucking with natural fingernails on a rosewood instrument construction, which is exemplified by the grandeur of the Mysore Veena. Pithapuram in East Godavari District and Bobbili in Vijayanagara District of Andhra Pradesh is also famous for Veena makers. Sangeeta Ratnakara calls it Ekatantri Veena, and gives the method for its construction.

While the Saraswati veena is considered in the lute genealogy, other North Indian veenas such as the Rudra veena and Vichitra veena are technically zithers. Descendants of Tansen reserved Rudra Veena for family and out of reverence began calling it the Saraswati Veena.

== Construction ==
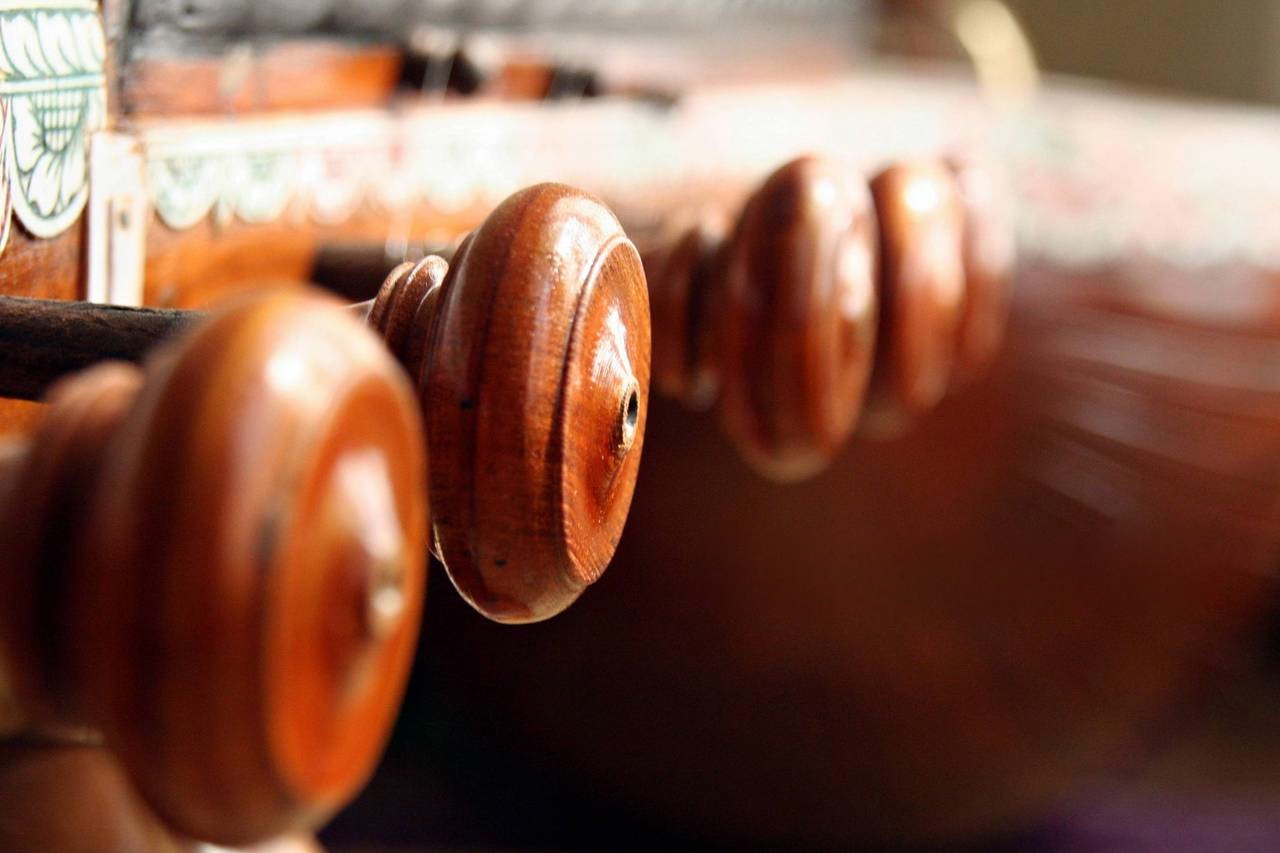
Tuning Pegs (Kunti) of Saraswati Veena

About four feet in length, its design consists of a large resonator (kudam) carved and hollowed out of a log (usually of jackfruit wood), a tapering hollow neck (dandi) topped with 24 brass or bell-metal frets set in scalloped black wax on wooden tracks, and a tuning box culminating in a downward curve and an ornamental dragon's head (yali). If the veena is built from a single piece of wood it is called (Ekanda) veena. A small table-like wooden bridge (kudurai)—about 2 x 2½ x 2 inches—is topped by a convex brass plate glued in place with resin. Two rosettes, formerly of ivory, now of plastic or horn, are on the top board (palakai) of the resonator. Four main playing strings tuned to the tonic and the fifth in two octaves (for example, B flat-E flat below bass clef - B flat- E flat in bass clef) stretch from fine tuning connectors attached to the end of the resonator across the bridge and above the fretboard to four large-headed pegs in the tuning box. Three subsidiary drone strings tuned to the tonic, fifth, and upper tonic (E flat - B flat- E flat in the tuning given above) cross a curving side bridge leaning against the main bridge, and stretch on the player's side of the neck to three pegs matching those of the main playing strings. All seven strings today are of steel.

== Playing technique ==
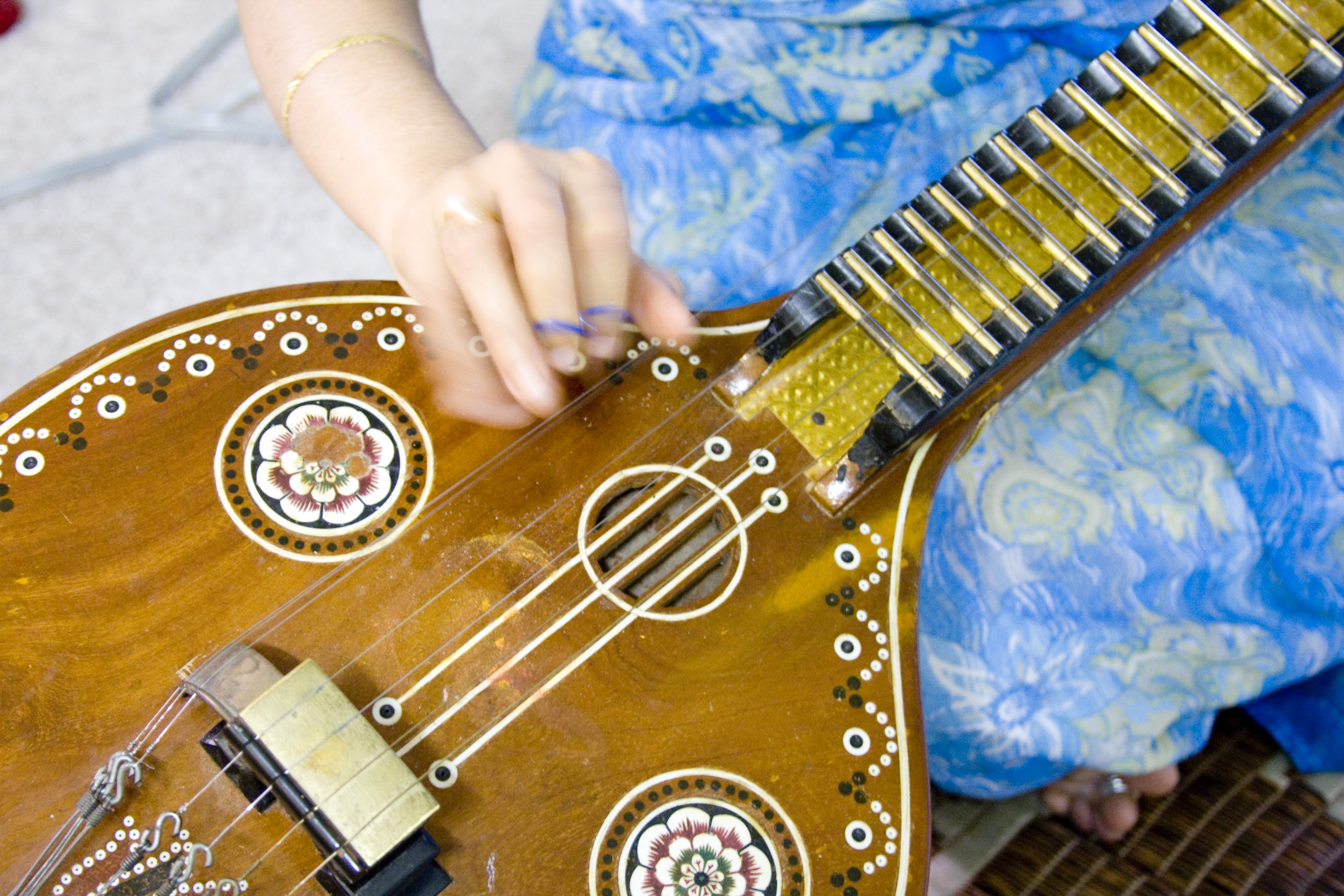
Close up of a veena being played.

The veena is played by sitting cross-legged with the instrument held tilted slightly away from the player. The small gourd on the left rests on the player's left thigh, the left arm passing beneath the neck with the hand curving up and around so that the fingers rest upon the frets. The palm of the right hand rests on the edge of the top plank so that the fingers (usually index and middle) can pluck the strings. The drone strings are played with the little finger. The veena's large resonator is placed on the floor, beyond the right thigh.

Like the sitar, the left hand technique involves playing on the frets, controlled pushing on the strings to achieve higher tones and glissandi through increased tension, and finger flicks, all reflecting the characteristics of various ragas and their ornamentation (gamaka). Modern innovations include one or two circular sound holes (like that of the lute), substitution of machine heads for wooden pegs for easier tuning, and the widespread use of transducers for amplification in performance.

== Religious associations within Hinduism ==
Goddess Saraswati depicted playing the veena

The Hindu goddess of learning and the arts, Saraswati, is often depicted playing a veena. The god Shiva is also depicted playing or holding a vina in his form called "Vinadhara," which means "bearer of the vina." The sage Narada is known as a veena maestro, and refers to 19 different kinds of Veena in Sangita Makarandha.

Ravana, the antagonist of the epic Ramayana, is described as a versatile veena player. Scholars hold that as Saraswati is the goddess of learning, the most evolved string instrument in a given age was placed in her hands by contemporary artistes.

== References in ancient texts and literature ==
The Ramayana, the Puranas and Bharata Muni's Natya Shastra all contain references to the veena, as well as the Sutra and the Aranyaka. The Vedic sage Yajnavalkya speaks of the greatness of the veena in the following verse: "One who is skilled in Veena play, one who is an expert in the varieties of srutis (quarter tones) and one who is proficient in tala (rhythm) attain salvation without effort."

Many references to the veena are made in old Sanskrit and Tamil literature, such as Lalita Sahasranama, Adi Shankara's Soundarya Lahari, poet Kalidasa's epic Sanskrit poem Kumarasambhava and Shyamala Dandakam, and Tamil Thevarams and the Thiruvasagam to name a few. Examples include "veena venu mridanga vAdhya rasikAm" in Meenakshi Pancharathnam, "mAsil veeNaiyum mAlai madhiyamum" Thevaram by Appar. Veena or the Hindu goddesses playing the veena i.e. Saraswathi and Shakti have also been referred to as kachchapi (in the Lalitha Sahasranama for example) or vipanchi (in the Soundarya Lahari) in Sanskrit texts. Musical compositions like Tyagaraja's Mokshamugaladha contain philosophies about the spiritual aspects of the veena.

Each physical portion of the veena is said to be the seat in which subtle aspects of various gods and goddesses reside in Hinduism. The instrument's neck is Shiva; the strings constitute his consort, Parvati. The bridge is Lakshmi, while the secondary gourd is Brahma, and the dragon head is Vishnu. Upon the “table” (or the resonating body) is Saraswati. "Thus, the veena is the abode of divinity and the source of all happiness."- R. Rangaramanuja Ayyangar

Eminent veena player E. Gayathri has mentioned in many interviews that the Aitareya Upanishad contains a verse stating that human beings are the “veena” created by God (daiva veena), and the Saraswati veena (instrument) is the man-made form (maanushi veena). According to her, the veena is resemblant of the human skeleton, where the resonating kudam represents the skull, the dandi and the lion (Yali) face the human backbone, and the twenty-four frets on the fretboard clearly represent the 24 vertebrae of the human spine.

== Variants ==
Scholars consider that, today, four instruments are signified by the name ‘veena’ (which, in the past, has been used as a generic, catch-all term for any stringed Indian instruments); these are the Tanjavur (Saraswati) Veena, Rudra veena, Vichitra veena, and Gottuvadhyam veena (also called the Chitra veena).

Modern-day evolving of the veena includes the Sruti veena (more an instrument for theoretical demonstration than for actual playing), which was constructed by Lalmani Misra in the early 1960s, and on which all 22 srutis can be produced simultaneously.

== Contemporary situation ==
Veena represents the system of Indian music. Several instruments evolved in response to cultural changes in the country. Communities of artists, scholars and craftsmen moved around and at times settled down. Thus Veena craftsmen of Kolkata were famous for their instruments. Similarly, Rudra Veena was given a new form which came to be known after the craftsmen of Tanjavur as Tanjavur Veena. Modern life-style is no longer limited to definite routine within a small locality, thus along with performers and teachers of Veena, the community of craftsmen is also on decline. Attempts to start institutions of instrument-making have been made, but there is a strong need for conservatories which focus on all aspects of Veena. As a state party to UNESCO Convention 2003, India has identified Veena as an element of Intangible Cultural Heritage and proposed its inscription in the Representative list of UNESCO.

Electronic and Digital veena: Over the years, the acoustic Tanjavur veena (also known as Saraswati veena) has been used in solo and duet concerts in large auditoria. Performers have also been travelling across the globe for concerts. Many practitioners of the art live outside India. The challenges faced by them in using the acoustic veena: 1. Low sound output (volume) compared to other louder instruments like flute or violin, causing the sound of the veena to be almost inaudible in concerts comprising other instruments along with the veena. This necessitated use of a contact mike (pioneered by Emani Sankara Sastri) or magnetic pickup (pioneered by S.Balachander). Usage of these requires carrying an additional amplispeaker to enable audibility to the performer. 2. Fragility of the acoustic instrument, causing frequent breakage and damage during travel. 3. Requirement of re-fretting every year or so, necessitating either carrying the instrument back to India or facilitating the travel and stay overseas, of the skilled artisan from India for this specific purpose.

All these factors led to the creation of the rudimentary electric veena, followed by the electronic veena(1986) and digital veena (2002) by the engineer-flautist G Raj Narayan of Bengaluru.(1971)

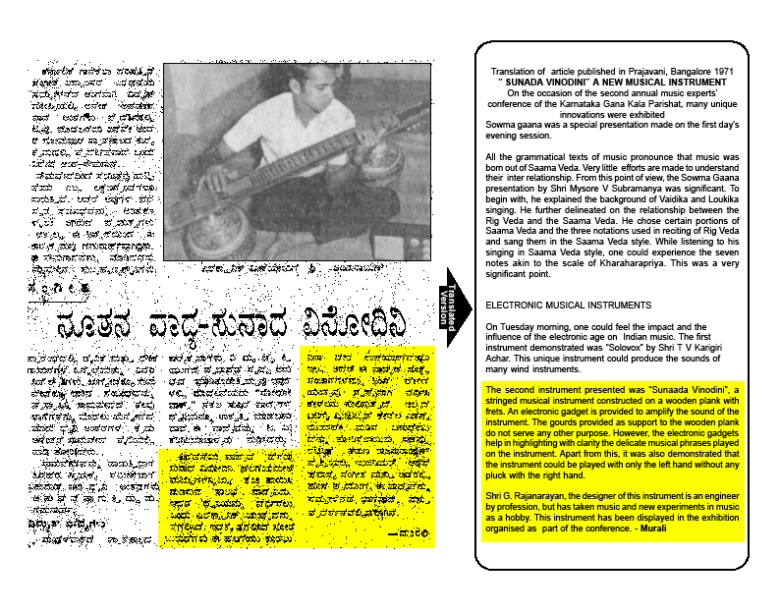
Electric veena

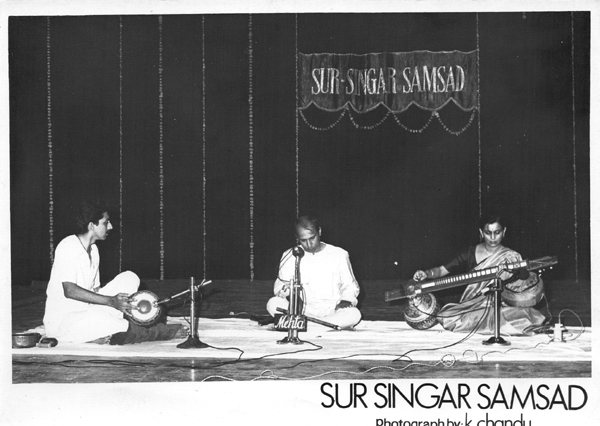
Early Electronic veena

The main characteristics of the electronic veena:

Enhanced volume, with the amplifier and speaker built into one of the gourds;

Built-in electronic tambura for sruti in the other removable gourd; Matched pick-up and amplispeaker to enable authentic sweet veena sound; Adjustable independent volume control for main and taala strings; Adjustable frets on a wooden fret board, eliminating the more delicate wax fret board, frets can be adjusted easily by the user; Guitar-type keys for easy and accurate tuning; Complete portability, as the sound box of the veena is dispensed with, and replaced by a plank of wood. Easy assembly / disassembly; Usage on battery in case of AC Mains power failure.

The electronic veena has gained popularity among users of the instrument. Videos of electronic veena concerts are available online.

However, this did not solve other issues such as need for repeated retuning while playing, change of strings for playing on higher pitch, mismatch of same note on different strings, etc. This led to the invention of the Digital veena (for which the inventor G Raj Narayan was awarded a patent by the Indian Patent office), demonstrated at the Madras Music Academy in 2002. This is the first synthesiser for Indian music, and its salient features are:

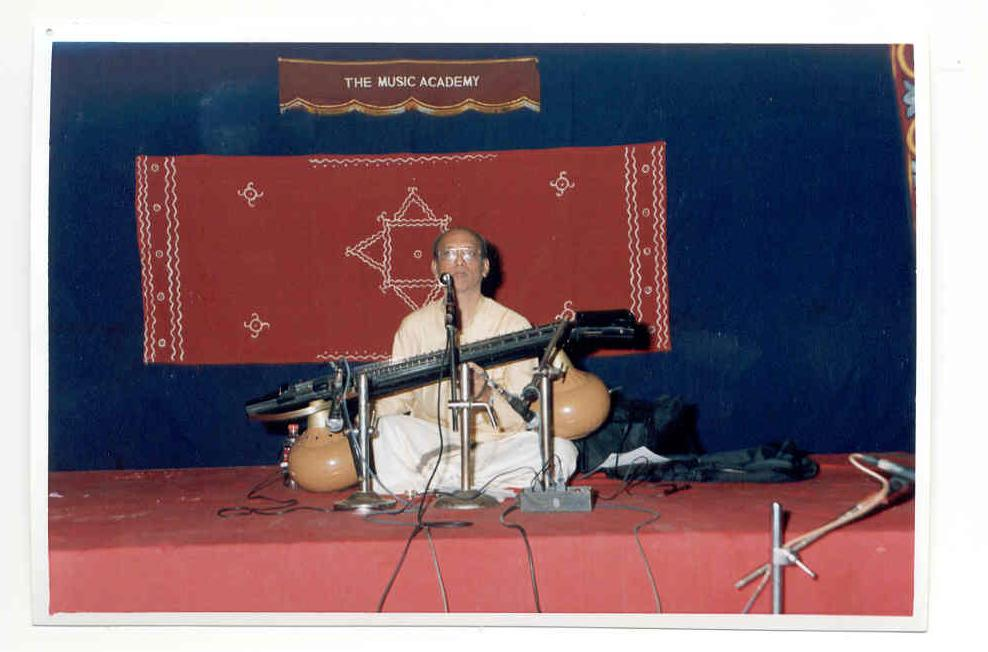
Photo of demonstration of digital veena

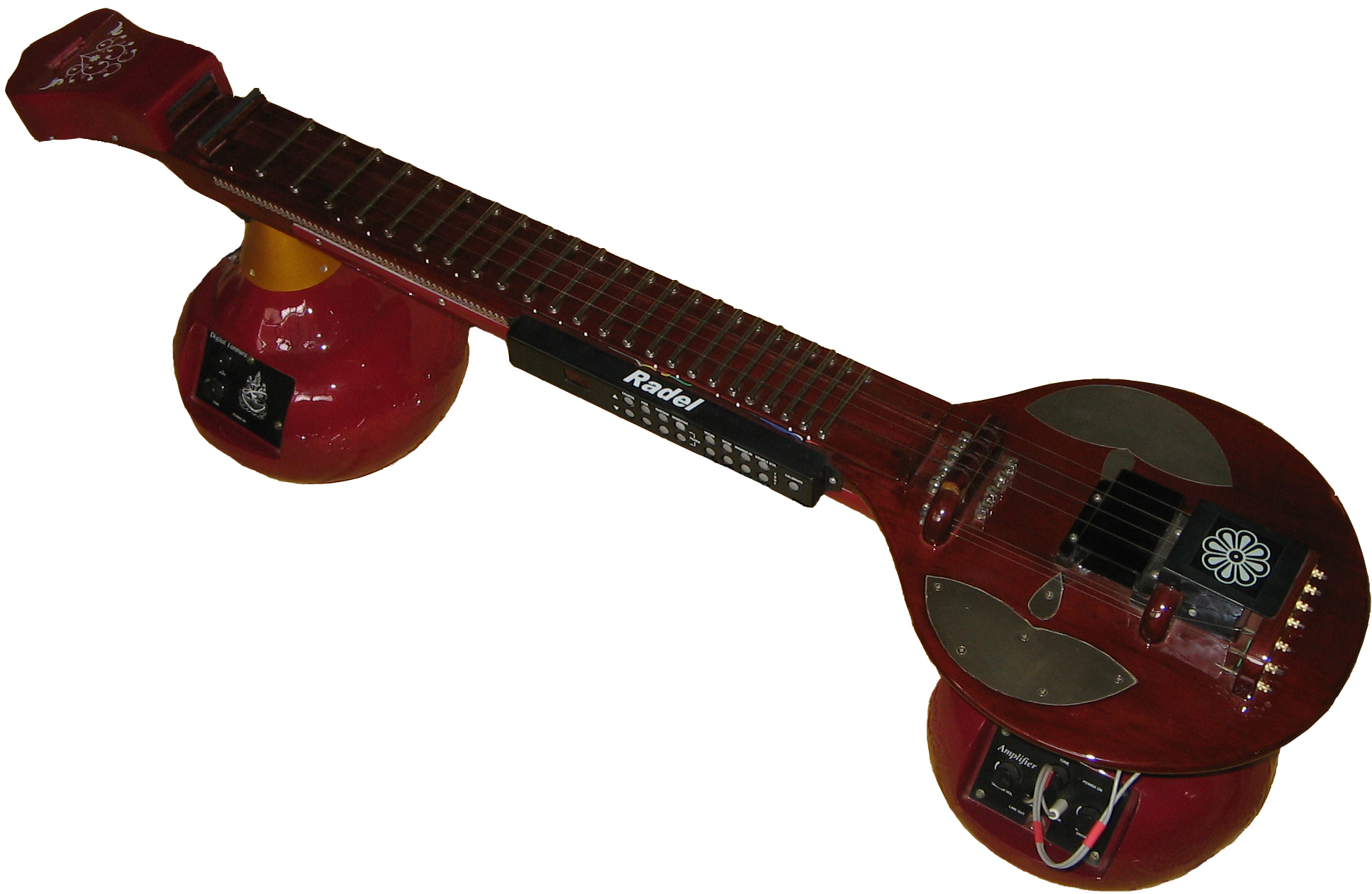

Can be used at any pitch without changing strings; All four strings and tala strings tuned automatically and perfectly on selection of ANY pitch; Selection of PA / MA for mandara panchamam and taala panchamam strings – PA will change to MA on open string but first fret will still be Suddha Dhaivatam; String will not change sruti while playing (frequency / sruti will not reduce or increase); Gamakam response adjustment – can be set for high response to smaller transverse deflection of finger or small response to more deflection. e.g., Selection can be made so that with a moderate pull of string, five-note gamakam can be achieved on the same fret; Enhanced volume, with the amplifier and speaker built-in to one of the gourds, adjustable volume; Increased sustenance of notes; thus long passages can be played with fewer plucks, adjustable ‘sustain’ to suit a user’s style; 8 ‘voice’ choices ( types of sound) – e.g. Tanjore veena, mandolin, saxophone, flute, etc.; Fixed frets on a wooden fret board, eliminating the more delicate wax fret board. No setting of melam. Digitally preset fret positions for perfect frequency of each note; Built-in electronic tambura for sruti and line-out facility, battery back-up in case of AC Mains power failure; Complete portability, as the sound box of the veena is dispensed with, and replaced by a detachable gourd with an ampli-speaker with easy assembly / disassembly.

The digital veena has also been used in junior/amateur concerts, and are available to view online.

== Tone and acoustics ==
Nobel Prize-winning physicist C.V. Raman has described the veena as having a unique construction. The string terminations at both ends are curved and not sharp. Also, the frets have much more curvature than any other instrument. Unlike in guitar, the string does not have to be pushed down to the very base of the neck, so no rattling sound is generated. This design enables a continuous control over the string tension, which is important for glissandi.

The beeswax beneath the frets may act as a noise filter.

== Notable vainikas ==
=== Pioneers and legends ===
Veene Sheshanna and Veena Subbanna in 1902. Seshanna was a concert musician at the court of the princely state of Mysore

- Muthuswami Dikshitar
- Veenai Dhanammal (1867 - 1938) (known for her individual style)
- Veena Sheshanna (1852 - 1926) (Mysore style)
- Veena Venkatagiriappa (1887 - 1951)
- Veena Doraiswamy Iyengar (1920 - 1997) (Mysore style)
- Emani Sankara Sastry (1922 - 1987) (Andhra style)
- Chitti Babu (1936 - 1996) (Andhra style)
- Karaikudi Sambasiva Iyer (1888 - 1958) (Karaikudi style)
- K. S. Narayanaswamy (1914 - 1999) (Travancore style)
- Trivandrum R Venkataraman (1938 - 2010) (Travancore style)
- S. Balachander (1927 - 1990) (known for his individual style)

=== Other exponents ===
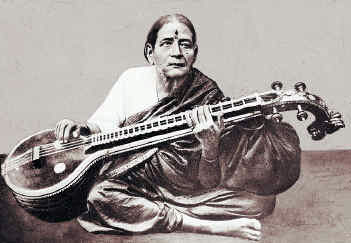
Veenai Dhanammal was one of the early exponents and Veena player of Tamil Nadu

- Ranganayaki Rajagopalan (1932 - 2018) (Karaikudi style)
- R Pitchumani Iyer (1919 - 2015)
- Madurai T. N. Seshagopalan
- B. Sivakumar
- Kalpakam Swaminathan (1922 - 2011)
- Mangalam Muthuswamy (1937 - 2007)

=== Contemporary artists ===
Rugmini Gopalakrishnan

Jayanthi Kumaresh performing a concert

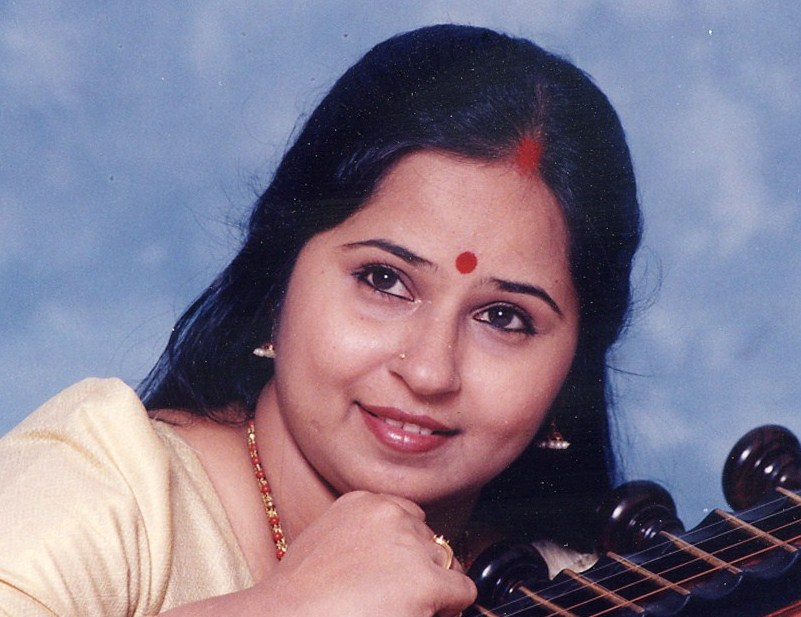
Veenai Gayathri

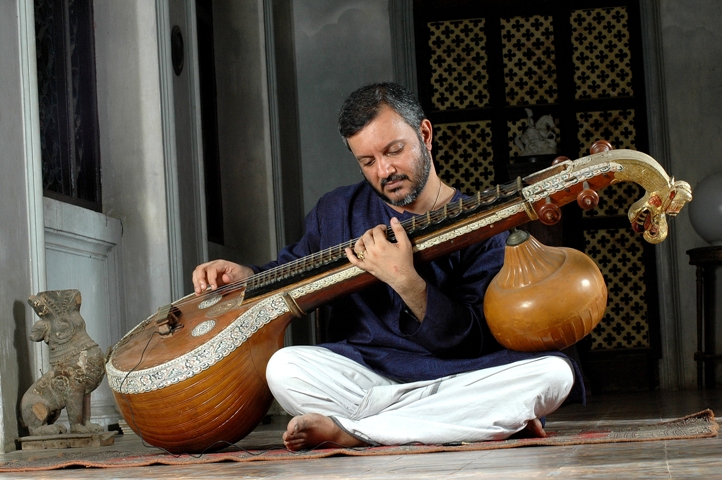
Prince Rama Varma

- Padmavathy Ananthagopalan (born 1934) - Chennai based, disciple of Lalgudi Gopala Iyer, creator of a portable veena, advocate of gurukula tradition and founder of Sri Satguru Sangita Vidyalaya music school.
- Rugmini Gopalakrishnan (born 1936) - Thiruvananthapuram based, disciple of K. S. Narayanaswamy.
- Karaikudi S. Subramanian (born 1944) - grandson and adoptive son of Karaikudi Sambasiva Iyer, 9th generation Veena player in the illustrious Karaikudi Veena Tradition.
- E. Gayathri (born 1959) - Chennai based, disciple of Kamala Aswathama and T. M. Thyagarajan, recognized with "Kalaimamani" and "Sangeet Natak Akademi" awards, Vice Chancellor of Tamil Nadu Music and Fine Arts University.
- D Balakrishna (born 1961) - Bangalore based, the torch bearer of the Mysore style of Veena playing, son and prime disciple of Mysore V. Doraiswamy Iyengar.
- B. Kannan (born 1964) - Chennai based, disciple of Vasantha Krishnamurthy and Pichumani Iyer, Founder-President of Youth Association for Classical Music (YACM) and composer of many thillanas.
- Nirmala Rajasekar (born 1966) - disciple of Kalpakam Swaminathan, recognized with McKnight Performing Artists Fellowship and founder of Naada Rasa music school.
- Prince Rama Varma (born 1968) - disciple of Trivandrum R Venkataraman and K. S. Narayanaswamy, organiser of Swathi Sangeethotsavam and member of the Travancore royal family.
- D. Srinivas (born 1968) - Hyderabad based, disciple of Srinivasan and P. Srinivasa Gopalan, recognized with "Ugadi Visishta Puraskaram" Award, "Ashtana Vidwan" of Shri Kanchi Kamakoti Peetham.
- Rajhesh Vaidhya (born 1973) - Chennai based, recognized with Kalaimani award, founder of Ravna International School of Veena, has worked with various music directors of Tamil movies.
- Prashanth Iyengar (born 1973) - Bangalore based, disciple of Padmasini Narasimhachar & R. K. Suryanarayana, composer of 90 varnas (including 72-varnas tuned in each of the 72-melakarta ragas), holder of the limca record for a 24-hour marathon veena concert.
- Jayanthi Kumaresh - Bangalore based, disciple of Padmavathy Ananthagopalan and S. Balachander, recognized with Kalamamani Award (awarded to tamilians), founder of Indian National Orchestra.
- Dr. Suma Sudhindra - Creator of the Tarantino Veena. Founder of Tarantino Academy/ Disciple of Chitti Babu.
- Veena Srivani Famous veena performer. Known for her viral veena covers.
- Tirupati Srivani Yalla - Tirupati based, recognized with "Veena Visharade", Lecturer in Veena S. V. Music College, TTD, Tirupati.
- Phani Narayana - Versatile veena artiste known for his dynamic music. Reputed teacher.
- Bhagyalakshmi Chandrasekharan - Exponent of the Gayaki style of music. Senior Vainika.
- Punya Srinivas - disciple of Kamala Aswathama and Suguna Varadachari, member of Panchachanyam band, specialising in fusion music, over 5000 film recordings to her credit.
- Jaysri-Jeyaraaj - Chennai-based artists, disciples of A. Anantharama Iyer and A. Champakavalli, recognized with "Nadha Kala Vipanchee" Award, founders of Veenavaadhini school.
- Revathy Krishna - Chennai based, disciple of Sundaram Iyer, and later with Sharada Shivanandam and K.P.Sivanandam; recognized with Kalaimanani and Kumar Gandharwa Awards, also now for film recordings.
- Iyer brothers - Melbourne based, disciples of R. Pichumani and R. Venkataraman, recognized with the Multicultural Award for Excellence by the State of Victoria.
- Suvir Misra - Delhi-based civil services officer proficient in Rudra veena, Saraswati veena and the Surbahar; inventor of the Misr Veena, known for playing Khayal in the Saraswati Veena.

== Veena festivals ==
- Maargashira/ Margazhi Veena Festival - since 2004 organized by Sri Guruguha Vaageyya Pratishtana Trust & Sri Guruguha Sangeeta Mahavidyala.
- Mudhra Veenotsav - since 2005 at Chennai
- Veena Navarathri - since 2007 at Chennai organized by the Veena foundation and the Indira Gandhi National Centre for the Arts
- International Veena conference and festival - since 2009 by Sri Annamacharya Project of North America (SAPNA)
- Rashtriya Veena Mahotsava organized by Guruguha Vaggeya Pratishtana Trist & Sri Guruguha Sangeeta Mahavidyalaya
- Ahorathri Veena Mahotsava organized by Guruguha Vaggeya Pratishtana Trist & Sri Guruguha Sangeeta Mahavidyalaya

== See also ==
- Carnatic music
