= Karaikudi S. Subramanian =

Indian veena player, music scholar and educator

Background information
- Born: Sambasiva Narayanan; 23 October 1944 (age 81); Madurai, Madras Presidency, British India
- Genre: Carnatic music
- Occupations: Musician, music scholar, educator
- Instrument: Veena
- Years active: 1960s–present
- Website: Brhaddhvani · Veenai Subramanian

Karaikudi Sambasiva Iyer Subramanian (born 23 October 1944) is an Indian Carnatic musician and veena player representing the ninth generation of the Karaikudi tradition. He is a grandson of Karaikudi Subbarama Iyer and was adopted in 1957 by his granduncle Karaikudi Sambasiva Iyer

Subramanian has worked as a performer, teacher and researcher, including as a professor of music at the University of Madras. In 1989 he co-founded Brhaddhvani, a Chennai-based research and training centre for music, with S. Seetha. His work at Brhaddhvani has included the development of the Correlated Objective Music Education and Training (COMET) system and research into musical notation and documentation.

== Early life and education ==
Subramanian (birth name Sambasiva Narayanan) was born in Madurai in 1944 to Narayanan Iyer and Lakshmi Ammal, a veena player. He was the third of their eight children, including his sister Rajeswari Padmanabhan (née Narayanan), a vainika of the Karaikudi tradition. In 1957, he was adopted by his granduncle Karaikudi Sambasiva Iyer and he subsequently moved to Chennai and lived with Sambasiva Iyer at the original Kalakshetra campus, where he underwent gurukulavasa, the traditional residential system of musical training. His training continued until Sambasiva Iyer's death in 1958.

Subramanian pursued higher education at Madura College, where he studied Chemistry and English Literature. In 1975, he moved to the United States to pursue postgraduate studies in ethnomusicology at Wesleyan University in Connecticut. His doctoral dissertation, South Indian Vina Tradition and Individual Style, examined differences in performance among South Indian instrumental traditions through comparative analysis.

== Career ==
From 1965 to 1967, Subramanian worked as a demonstrator in Chemistry at Madura College. He then returned to Chennai, where he served as an English lecturer at Vivekananda College from 1970 to 1975. He subsequently taught music and worked with the Singapore Indian Fine Arts Society before undertaking doctoral studies in ethnomusicology at Wesleyan University.

From 1981 to 1983, he was associated with the Department of Extramural Studies at the University of Singapore. In 1986, he joined the Department of Indian Music at the University of Madras, where he served as a professor of music until his retirement in 2002. In 1990, he was appointed Valentine Visiting Professor of Music at Amherst College. He subsequently held or undertook academic appointments, lectures, seminars and workshops at universities and music institutions in India and abroad, including San Francisco State College, SOAS University of London, Leeds College of Music, York University, the University of Michigan, the University of Limerick, University College Cork, Dublin City University and Maynooth University.

Subramanian has continued to perform the veena in India and internationally. His performances have included collaborations with musicians from outside the Carnatic tradition.

Subramanian's published writings include An Introduction to the Vina, published in Asian Music in 1985; South Indian Vina Tradition and Individual Style, his doctoral dissertation, published in 1986; and Text, Tone, and Tune: Interrelationships Among Text, Tune and Tone in Karnatak Music, published in the proceedings of a seminar organised by the American Institute of Indian Studies in 1986–1987.

== Music education: Brhaddhvani and COMET ==
In 1989, Subramanian and S. Seetha founded Brhaddhvani, a research and training centre for music in Chennai. Subramanian's experience in university music education led him to examine the limitations of conventional approaches to musical training, particularly in accommodating students with different levels of musical aptitude and prior training. Brhaddhvani was established to develop approaches to music education that could make systematic musical training accessible to a wider range of learners. Seetha, who had previously headed the Department of Indian Music at the University of Madras, supported the establishment of the organisation.

At Brhaddhvani, Subramanian developed the Correlated Objective Music Education and Training (COMET) system as part of his work in music education. The system combines elements of traditional gurukula pedagogy with a structured, graded approach to musical learning. It extends from foundational instruction to higher-level study, research and interdisciplinary applications of music.

Brhaddhvani has also initiated outreach programmes to take music education into schools and rural communities. These programmes have included village-based instruction, including a programme at Vilvarani that combined basic Carnatic music with activities involving rhythm, arithmetic, folk music and Tamil literary texts. The organisation has subsequently conducted similar educational initiatives in the Tiruchirappalli region.

Brhaddhvani's activities have included research, documentation, pedagogy, publications and recordings, and have involved musicians, dancers, theatre practitioners and scholars. Individuals associated with its activities have included musicians such as Sripada Pinakapani, Semmangudi Srinivasa Iyer, K. V. Narayanaswami, Lalgudi Jayaraman, T. Viswanathan and Trichy Sankaran, as well as scholars and educators including S. R. Janakiraman, David Reck, Eero Hämeenniemi, David Claman and Ludwig Pesch.

== Documentation ==
Subramanian has undertaken projects involving the documentation and preservation of the vina tradition and its associated craftsmanship. Brhaddhvani has organised programmes and festivals focusing on the vina as both a solo and accompanying instrument. Since the early 1990s, the organisation has also supported vina craftsmen and projects concerning vina making. Subramanian collaborated with the German instrument maker Norbert Beyer on a book documenting aspects of vina craftsmanship.

His documentation work has also extended to musical traditions outside the Karaikudi vina tradition. In collaboration with Dharani, a school of performing arts in Kochi, Brhaddhvani undertook the Sopanam project with support from the India Foundation for the Arts. The project documented Sopanam, a form of traditional temple music associated with Kerala, through the identification and notation of its ragas and talas, together with audio and video recordings.

The Sopanam project employed Subramanian's svarasthana notation for the transcription of the repertoire. Its documentation included five digital video tapes, 75 audio tapes, five MiniDiscs, one VHS tape, more than 100 slides and nearly 500 photographs.

== Performance and intercultural work ==
Subramanian's performance career has encompassed traditional Carnatic concerts as well as collaborations with musicians from other musical traditions. Through Brhaddhvani, he has also participated in cross-cultural musical exchanges involving musicians from different traditions. These have included collaborations with practitioners of jazz, Irish traditional music and other musical traditions, as well as programmes combining musical performance with study and discussion.

In 2004, American jazz trumpeter Woody Shaw III and musicians associated with the jazz programme at the New School in New York participated in an exchange with Brhaddhvani. The programme culminated in a performance titled Beyond Boundaries, in which Shaw performed with mridangist Trichy Sankaran and violinists Lalgudi G. J. R. Krishnan and Lalgudi Vijayalakshmi. Subramanian composed Nirnaya for the programme, incorporating elements of jazz and Carnatic music.

Subramanian has collaborated with Irish fiddler Martin Hayes (musician) and guitarist Dennis Cahill (musician) as well as the Irish button accordion player Tony MacMahon in cross-cultural interactions between Indian music and Irish traditional music. In December 2014, Subramanian performed with Hayes, Dennis Cahill and sarode player Matthew Noone during their tour of India. Hayes, Cahill and Noone spent five days in residence at Brhaddhvani in Chennai. The collaboration brought together Carnatic and Irish traditional music and was documented in the short film The Sound of a Country by Myles O'Reilly. In 2015, Subramanian performed in Ireland with Hayes and Noone as part of the Masters of Tradition programme, continuing the collaboration that developed from the 2014 Indian tour.

Subramanian has also participated in performances, lectures, seminars and masterclasses at universities and music institutions in Europe and North America. These engagements have included presentations on Carnatic music and the COMET system, veena performances and masterclasses.

== Recordings ==
In 1975, Subramanian and his sister, Rajeswari Padmanabhan, were invited to Berlin to record music from the Karaikudi family tradition. The recording, Musik für Vīṇā – Südindien, featured Subramanian and Padmanabhan on the vīṇā, accompanied on the mridangam by Tanjore Upendran, and was issued by the German label Wergo in association with the Staatliche Museen zu Berlin.

Subramanian later recalled the Berlin recording as an early experience in the documentation of musical performance. He has also discussed the recording in connection with his subsequent interest in music documentation and ethnomusicology.

== Selected publications ==
- Subramanian, Karaikudi S. (1985). "An Introduction to the Vina". Asian Music. 16 (2): 7–82. doi:10.2307/833772. JSTOR 833772.
- Subramanian, Karaikudi S. (1986). South Indian Vina Tradition and Individual Style (PhD dissertation). Wesleyan University.
- Berlin, Gabriele; Simon, Artur; Subramanian, Karaikudi S. (2009). "Continuity and Change in Music Tradition in Contemporary South India – A Case Study of Brhaddhvani". Continuity and Change in Music Tradition in Contemporary South India: A Case Study of Brhaddhvani. Verlag für Wissenschaft und Bildung.

== Recognition ==
Subramanian has been designated a Top-Grade artist by All India Radio and has performed for radio as well as in concert settings in India and abroad.

His early international recording work in Germany formed part of the documentary and performance history of the Karaikudi tradition and contributed to his subsequent interest in ethnomusicological research and documentation.
