= Prashanth (disambiguation) =

Prashanth (born 1973) is an Indian actor and businessman.

Prashanth may also refer to:

Given name

- Prashanth Iyengar, Indian musician
- Prashanth Menon, Indian cricketer
- Prashanth Nair, Indian-born American cricketer
- Prashanth Neel, Indian film director and screenwriter
- Prashanth Poojary (d. 2015), a victim of murder
- Prashanth Sellathurai, Australian gymnast
- Prashanth Siddi, Indian actor
- Prashanth Varma, Indian cricketer
- Prashanth Venkataramanujam, American television writer, actor and producer
- Prashanth R Vihari, Indian composer

Surname

- Avani Prashanth, Indian golfer
- Sai Prashanth, Indian actor
- Vijay Sundar Prashanth, Indian tennis player

== See also ==
- Vemula Prashanth Reddy, Indian politician
- Prashant Vihar metro station, Delhi Metro, India
