= Rajeswari Padmanabhan =

Indian veena artist

- Born: 1939; Devakottai, Tamil Nadu, British India
- Died: 15 August 2008 (aged 68–69); India
- Occupation: Musician
- Spouse: Padmanabhan Neelakantan
- Parents: Devakottai Narayana Iyer (father); Lakshmi Ammal (mother)
- Awards: Sangeet Natak Akademi Award; Kalaimamani Award
- Musical career
- Genres: Carnatic music
- Instrument: Veena

Rajeswari Padmanabhan (1939-2008) was a Veena artist from Tamil Nadu, India. Rajeshwari was the ninth generation descendant of the Karaikudi Veena tradition in Carnatic music. She received many awards including Sangeet Natak Akademi Award and Kalaimamani Award given by the Tamil Nadu Eyal Isai Nataka Mantram.

== Biography ==
Rajeshwari Padmanabhan was born in 1939 in Devakottai, Sivaganga district, Tamil Nadu, the daughter of Lakshmi Ammal and the granddaughter of Karaikudi Subbarama Iyer, the eldest of the Karaikudi Veena brothers.

Rajeswari died on 15 August 2008.

Her daughter Sreevidhya Chandramouli is a tenth-generation descendent of the Karaikudi Veena tradition.

== Music career ==
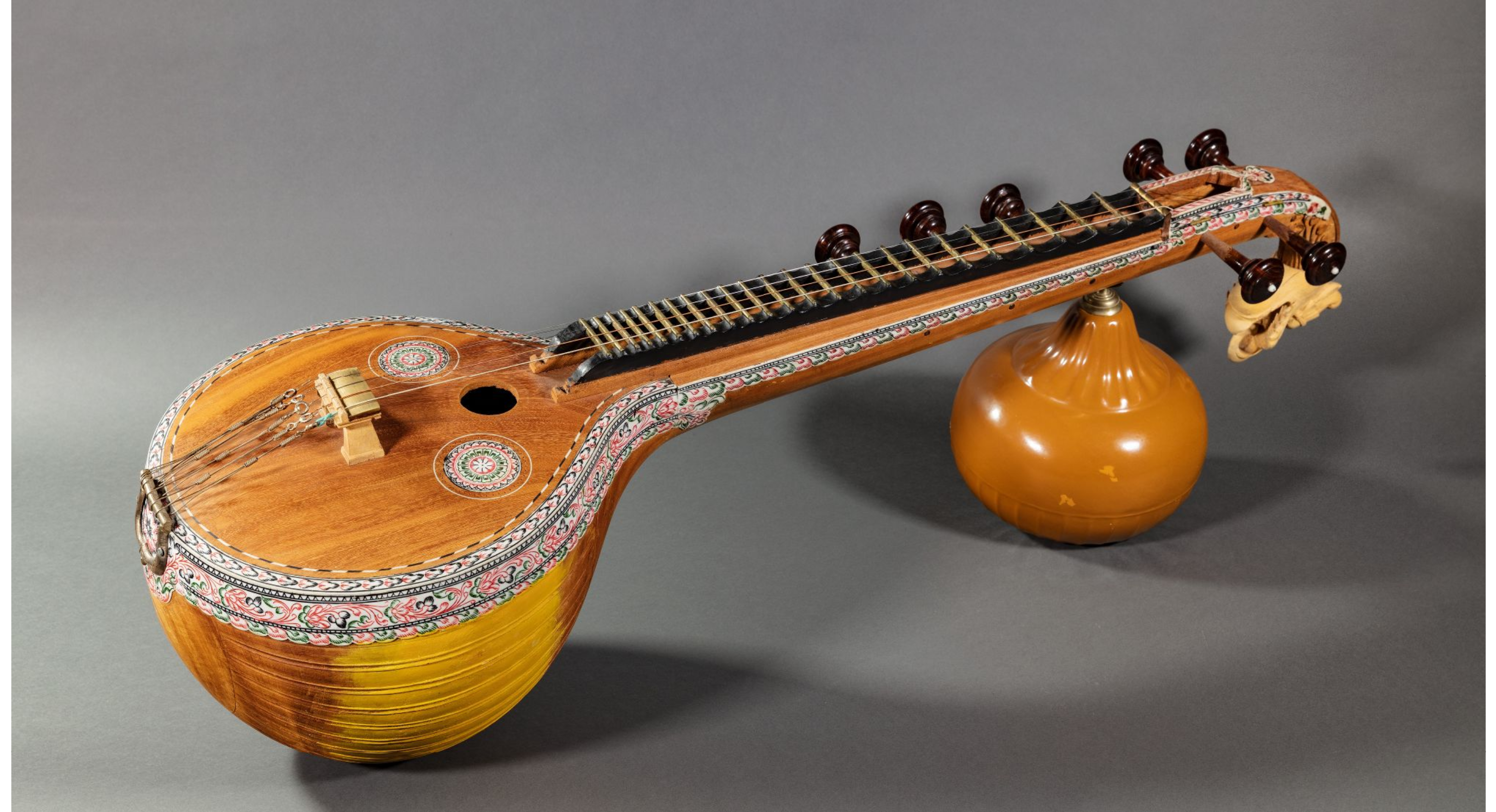
Saraswati vina from Rajeswari Padmanabhan by 1991, from 2019 Musikinstrumentensammlung of University of Göttingen

Rajeshwari was the ninth generation descendant of the Karaikudi Veena tradition. From the age of five, she began to study Veena under her grandfather and younger brother of the Karaikudi brothers, Karaikudi Sambasiva Iyer, in the gurukula system and continued under his guidance until Maestro's death in 1958. She also learned Carnatic vocal music from Mysore Vasudevachar, under the Government of India scholarship. Retired as Principal, she worked and taught at Rukmini Devi College of Fine Arts (Kalakshetra) for many years. Besides performing, she has also composed a few varnams and tillanas and has composed music for the dance drama Kumbheshwar Kuravanji.

== Awards and honors ==
- Sangeet Natak Akademi Award
- Kalaimamani
