= Iyer Brothers =

- Origin: Melbourne, Victoria, Australia
- Genres: Carnatic; Saraswati veena
- Years active: 1994–present
- Members: Ramnath Iyer; Gopinath Iyer

The Iyer Brothers are an Australian-based Carnatic music ensemble formed in 1994 by the twins, Ramnath and Gopinath Iyer, who each use Saraswati veenas. They released an album, Sound of Tradition, which was broadcast by Australian Broadcasting Corporation (ABC) Radio National's The Weekend Planet on 27 January 2012.

== History ==
The Iyer Brothers have been performing together since 1994 in Melbourne. They are disciples of veena maestros, vidhwans (translated as "scholars") R. Pichumani and Trivandrum R Venkataraman. They are A-graded artists of All India Radio, Chennai. In 1990, they established the Pichumani School of Carnatic Music in Melbourne. The school teaches students the art of veena playing and vocal music. Their performance though with two instruments almost sounds like one as they have almost matching tonal quality. Their style is sober, traditional and substantive.

They duo released an album, Sound of Tradition, which was aired by Australian Broadcasting Corporation (ABC) Radio National's The Weekend Planet on 27 January 2012. It was recorded in Chennai with two local drummers, Chidambaram S Balashankar on mridangam and Madipakkam Murali on ghatam. The performance was rebroadcast in March 2014.

== Awards ==
- Multicultural Award for Excellence 2010 - Contribution to Arts - by the Premier of the State of Victoria Mr John Brumby.
- Performance at the Cleveland Tyagaraja Festival 2013 in Cleveland, United States.
