= Jayanthi Kumaresh =

Indian Veena musician (1969)

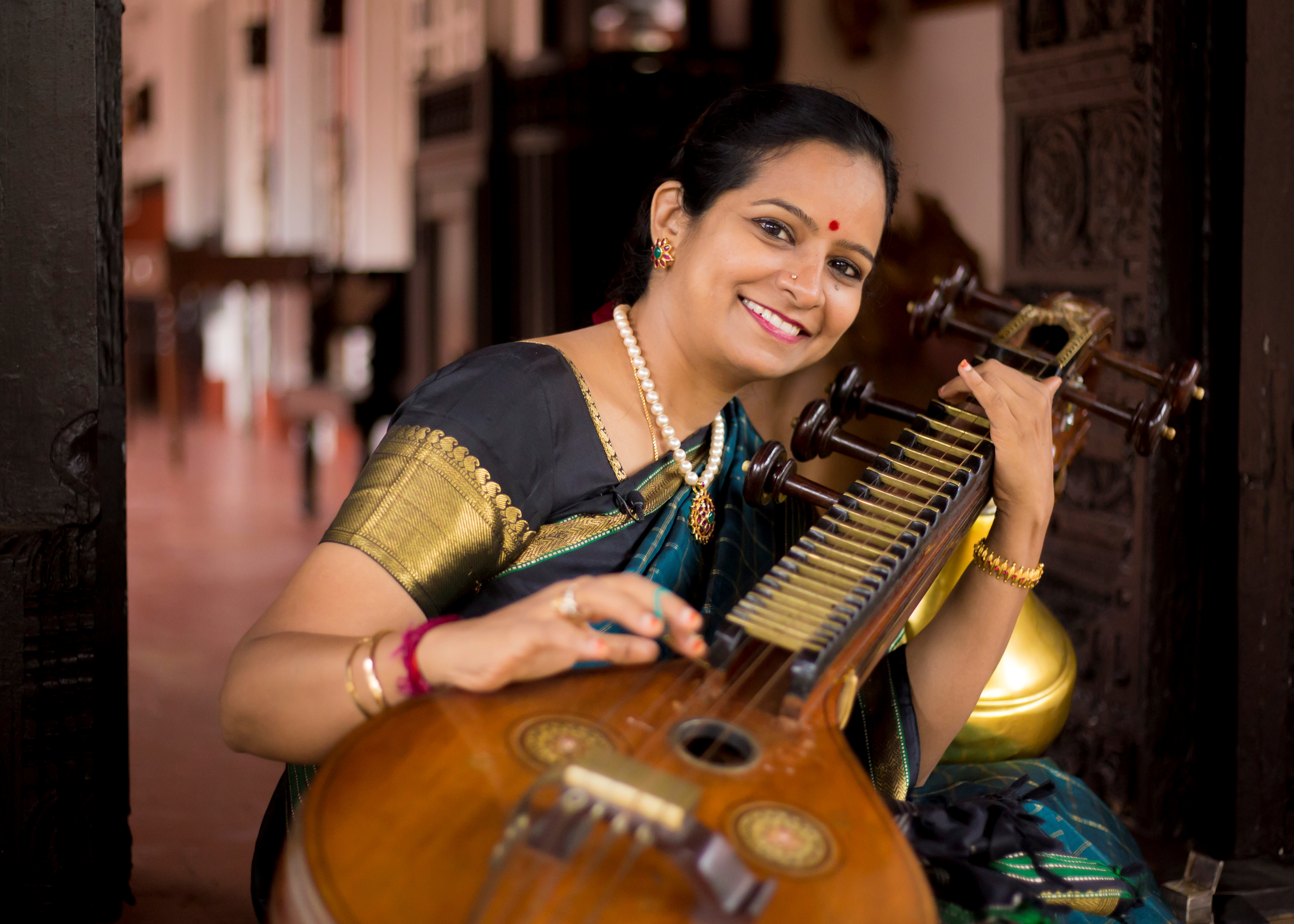
- Jayanthi Kumaresh with the Saraswathi veena

Background information
- Born: 1969 (age 56–57)
- Origin: Bengaluru, India
- Genre: Carnatic Music
- Occupations: Vainika, Composer
- Instrument: Saraswati Veena
- Website: jayanthikumaresh.com

Jayanthi Kumaresh (born 1969) is an Indian classical musician best known for her mastery of the Saraswati veena. With a performing career of more than forty years, she has given concerts throughout India and abroad, recorded widely, and engaged in research and outreach dedicated to the instrument. Jayanthi holds a postgraduate degree in English literature and a doctorate from the University of Mysore for her analytical study of veena playing styles. She is the youngest veena player to receive an A-Top grading from All India Radio, the highest classification awarded to performing artists in India She received the Sangita Kalanidhi award for 2026

Her web series Cup O’ Carnatic (2016 – present) offers brief introductions to ragas and compositional forms and has received several million views. A stage version of the series, combining music, animation, and storytelling, was presented in Bengaluru (2024) and Chennai (2025).

Jayanthi received the Government of India’s Sangeet Natak Akademi Award in 2022 and the Sangeet Shikhar Samman from Bharatiya Vidya Bhavan, New Delhi, in 2019

== Early life and education ==
Jayanthi represents the sixth generation of a family of musicians. She began formal study at age three with her mother, Lalgudi Rajalakshmi. At thirteen she entered the Gurukul of her aunt, Vidushi Padmavathy Ananthagopalan, remaining there for twenty-two years, and later studied with S. Balachander.

She received further guidance from her maternal uncle, violinist Lalgudi Jayaraman, and from T. Brinda, T. R. Subramaniam, and Thanjavur Shankara Iyer.

She is a researcher and holds a doctorate from the University of Mysore for her work on "styles and playing techniques of the Saraswati veena" and conducts workshops and lecture demonstrations around the world. She has founded the Indian National Orchestra, an ensemble that brings together artists from Carnatic and Hindustani traditions. Her dissertation examines historical playing styles, references in classical treatises, and recent developments such as electronic Veenas. Portions of her research have been published in academic journals. She is married to Kumaresh Rajagopalan, the younger of the violinist duo Ganesh–Kumaresh.

== Career ==
Since the early 1980s Jayanthi has toured extensively, appearing at venues such as the Royal Albert Hall (London), Théâtre de la Ville (Paris), National Centre for the Performing Arts (Mumbai), Lincoln Center (New York), and the Sydney Opera House. Festival appearances include the BBC Proms, Celtic Connections (Scotland), Bengal Classical Music Festival (Bangladesh), WOMADelaide, and Sawai Gandharva Bhimsen Mahotsav (Pune).

In 2024 she performed at the Sydney Opera House with the trio Triveni, alongside Hindustani violinist Kala Ramnath and tabla player Zakir Hussain. The trio had previously completed an 18-city North American tour in 2022. Critics have praised her live performances for their technical clarity and emotive power, noting for instance that "Jayanthi’s Saraswathi Veena mesmerises" at the Dehradun Concert.

Venues where Jayanthi was featured have included:

- BBC Proms, London, UK
- Darbar Festival, London, UK
- Celtic Connections, Scotland
- Paris Festival of India, France
- San Francisco Jazz Festival, USA
- WOMADelaide, Australia & New Zealand
- Humboldt Forum Museum, Berlin, Germany
- Esplanade, Singapore
- Rikskonsertene, Norway
- Royal Festival Hall, London, UK
- Kennedy Center, Washington DC, USA
- Sydney Opera House
- Irvine Barclay Theatre
- The Grand Theatre, Nita Mukesh Ambani Cultural Centre
- Sawai Gandharva Bhimsen Mahotsav, Pune

== Collaborations and Global Endeavors ==
Jayanthi’s collaborative work spans a wide spectrum of genres and formats. She founded the 21-member Indian National Orchestra (INO), which presents new compositions that combine Carnatic and Hindustani styles. In her North–South jugalbandi concerts she has appeared with Ustad Zakir Hussain, Kala Ramnath, Ronu Mazumdar, Purbayan Chatterjee, Rakesh Chaurasia and other artists, offering duet programmes that juxtapose the two traditions. In 2022 Jayanthi, Kala Ramnath (violin) and Ustad Zakir Hussain (tabla) formed the trio Triveni, which explores the confluence of Hindustani and Carnatic idioms. The ensemble has since undertaken an 18-city North-American tour and performed at venues such as the Sydney Opera House and Singapore's Esplanade.

Beyond these projects, Jayanthi has shared the stage with a wide range of Indian maestros. Recent examples include a jugalbandi with Carnatic vocalist Bombay Jayashri and appearances with artists such as Haridhwaramangalam A. K. Palanivel, Aruna Sairam, Sudha Ragunathan, Kaushiki Chakraborty, Mysore Manjunath, Lalgudi Vijayalakshmi, Sikkil Mala Chandrasekar and Grammy-winner Ricky Kej. She was a featured artist in Universal Notes, a Darbar Festival production with the British Philharmonic Orchestra that linked Carnatic and Hindustani idioms, and in Harmonies Across Continents, a joint programme with the Baroque ensemble Lautten Compagney at Berlin’s Humboldt Forum. Her long-running duet series Strings Attached with violinist Kumaresh showcases original and classical repertoire, while Parallel Strings pairs the veena with pianist Anil Srinivasan in cross-stylistic recitals.

== Discography ==
Jayanthi has released several albums with multiple themes and presentations, which includes 45 Ragas, Jagruthi, Shankaram, Run with SA, Thillana Thillana, Timeless Tunes, The Singing Veena, Veena Saman, Veena Visions, Walking Together, and many others. Jayanthi composed and released the album "Mysterious Duality", in which the artist has played 7 different Veena tracks. This album has been hailed as a path breaker. Jayanthi has recorded for Labels Times Music, Music Today, Sa re ga ma, Sense World, and Home Records.

| Title | Date | Collaborators |
|---|---|---|
| The Singing Veena | | Saregama-His Master's Voice |
| Jagruthi | 2000 | Music Today (solo) |
| Shankaram | 2003 | Music Today |
| December Season | 2007 | Charsur |
| Thillana thillana | 2007 | Home Records |
| Walking together | 2007 | Navras Records, UK (Gaurav Majumdar Sitar) |
| Mandala | 2008 | Sense World Music |
| Shastriya Syndicate – Syndicated | 2008 | Sense World Music |
| Moving Melodies | | Charsur |
| Mysterious Duality | 2010 | EarthSync |
| Flowers of Southern India | 2012 | Centaur Records, USA |
| Strings Attached | 2012 | Home Records |
| Veena Saman | 2013 | Hansavedas Academy, USA |
| Vipanchi | 2014 | Avadoota Dutta Peetam |
| Timeless Tunes | 2016 | Home Records |
| 45 Ragas | 2018 | Home Records |
| Run with Sa | 2023 | HomeRecords (FiddlingMonk Violin) |
| Sanmarga | | HomeRecords |
| Veena Seshanna Compositions | | |
| Veena Visions | 2024 | Home Records |

== Teaching and outreach ==
Jayanthi has worked with India’s Ministry of Culture and Rikskonsertene on lecture series and masterclasses, delivered TED talks, and collaborated with SPIC MACAY to widen Carnatic music’s audience. At the Madras Music Academy’s morning academic sessions she has presented papers on topics such as “Styles of Veena Playing” and "Tanam and its Impact on Raga Grammar."

=== Cup O' Carnatic ===
Her web series, Cup O' Carnatic (2016–present) offers concise explanations of Carnatic concepts. Later seasons linked ragas to popular melodies, produced episodes for children, and examined individual ragas in depth. Jayanthi has remarked that one goal of Cup O’ Carnatic was to remove the idea that Carnatic music is too complex for lay listeners.

Her latest production, Cup o' Carnatic, a live show, which premiered in Bengaluru and later in Chennai, is a blend of music, animation and storytelling.

=== Jayanthi Kumaresh Academy for Veena ===
Founded in 2021, the academy provides online masterclasses aimed at widening access to veena instruction

== Productions ==
As a composer Jayanthi has written scores for dance works (Krishna Bhakthi, Abbakarani, Jagadguru Adi Shankaracharya), for the National South Asian Youth Orchestra (UK), and for single releases such as “Janani,” “Vasanthabhairavi,” and “A Thousand Stars.” Her stage concepts include Story in Concert, which combines narration, painting, and music, Colours of Kalyani - an entire concert presented in Raga Kalyani and the 45 Ragas Concert, a continuous garland of ragas without kritis or accompaniment. She also leads the fusion ensemble Indian Spice and has recorded therapeutic music for Times Now. IndianExpress hails her novel ideas thus: "Blending the traditional and the innovative in her music in terms of content, technique, virtuosity and expression, Jayanthi seeks to express the true voice of the veena, which transcends the boundaries of language and region."

== Awards ==
- 2006: State award of Kalaimamani from Tamil Nadu Government
- 2018: Indira Sivasailam Endowment Medal - Chennai
- 2019: Bhavan's Sangeet Shikhar Samman - Bharatiya Vidya Bhavan, New Delhi
- 2020: K.S. Narayanaswamy Award for Veena - Shanmukhananda Fine Arts, Mumbai
- 2022: Sangeetha Vedanta Dhurina - Bangalore
- 2022: Sangeet Natak Academy
- 2026: Sur Jyotsna National Music Award was honored Legend Award for her exceptional contribution to Indian classical music, particularly for her mastery of the Saraswati Veena and for promoting Indian classical music globally
