= Anai Ayya brothers =

"Composers of Carnatic music Anai Iyer and Ayyavaiyyar"

Anai Ayya brothers were brothers named Anai and Ayya who lived in the 18-19th century Tamil Nadu, and were composers of Carnatic music. Anai Iyer (1776–1850) and Ayyavaiyyar (1778–1857) used the mudra Umadasa and composed mostly in Telugu and Tamil. Anai Ayya brothers were born in Vaiyacheri and spent all of their life in the village.

The Anai Ayya brothers were close contemporaries of the Trinity of Carnatic Music and especially had a closer and good rapport with the great composer Saint Tyagaraja. They were related to the legendary vocalist Maha Vaidyanatha Iyer and the versatile and blessed poet Ramaswamy Iyer (together called the Vaiyacheri Sivan Brothers). Ramaswamy Iyer and Maha Vaidyanatha Iyer's mother Arundhati (or Thayu) Amba belonged to the clan of Anai Ayya brothers. Also, the eminent percussionist considered to be the father of Thanjavur Bhaani of Mridangam playing Shri Thanjavur Vaidyanatha Iyer is a paternal descendant of one of the composer brothers, Ayyavaiyyar.

Anai Ayya brothers regularly attended the famous Thiruvaiyaru Sapthasthaana Utsava and used to participate in the Namasamkirtana and Bhajan music processions along with Saint Tyagaraja and their disciples at Thiruvaiyaru. During one such Utsava procession when both Saint Tyagaraja's and Anai Ayya's troupe were singing together along the temple car streets of the Aiyarappar Temple, Anai Ayya brothers excelled in their Alapana of the Varali raga. Saint Tyagaraja who was listening to their Varali raga exposition was ecstatic and moved to tears of joy and is said to have exclaimed: "Varali is your treasure. You are made to sing Varali and it is my privilege to enjoy listening to it".

Together they wrote many kritis out of which only about 26 Tamil and 12 Telugu compositions are currently available. They have composed several kritis on the presiding deities of Vaiyacheri, Thiruvaiyaru, Chidambaram and Tiruvannamalai. Their compositions had the theme of devotion sprinkled with philosophy, Jñāna, Vairagya (Vairāgya (वैराग्य)) and bhakti. Their songs were in praise of Siva and his consort Amba. They were also patronised by the king Serfoji II of Thanjavur.

According to an oral tradition, the music of the Anai Ayya brothers attracted even the venomous cobras. They seemed to enjoy their music. The deadly reptiles could not be scared away even by the panicky human rasikas nor would they harm them in any way. They would quietly slip away after the mangalam. This is a fitting testimony to the greatness of their music and the treasure of their impeccable voice (saareera sampath).

Some of their popular compositions include Bhajana Seyave O Manasaa (Kedaram), Amba nannu Brovave (Todi), Intha paraakaa (Naadhanaamakriya, janya of Mayamalavagowla), Paruvam paarkka nyaayamaa (Dhanyasi), Sharanu sharanu (Senchurutti), Etthanaithaan Vitthai Kattraalum (Anandabhairavi), Kaana Kannaayiram Venum (Neelambari), Yeliyenai Marandha (Yadukulakamboji), Vidhi Illaarkku (Kharaharapriya), Varmamaa Enmeedhil (Saveri) and Mahima theliya tharamaa (Sankarabharanam).

The brothers were also regular invited performers for the famous Varahur Uriyadi Utsavam celebrated at Varahur during every Krishna Janmashtami replete with festive ambience. The festival attracted thousands of participants from the surrounding villages across the Thanjavur Delta region along the mighty River Kaveri. Thamizh Thaatha U. V. Swaminatha Iyer has written a heart-wrenching incident related to the composition of Podhum Podhum Ayya in Punnagavarali as narrated to him by Maha Vaidyanatha Iyer in his book Puthiyathum Pazhaiyathum under the chapter Thalaimuraikkum Podhum. Podhum Podhum Ayya was sung extemporaneously in the precincts of Varahur (Varaahapuri) Shri Prasanna Venkatesa Perumal Temple (https://www.varagur.org/).

The brothers seem to have a few disciples including Vaiyacheri Panchanatha Iyer (or Doraiswamy Iyer, the father of Ramaswamy Iyer and Maha Vaidyanatha Iyer). However, two of the disciplic lineages have gone to produce world-renowned musicians and composers. One set of lineage branching out through their own grandsons Ramaswamy Iyer and Maha Vaidyanatha Iyer, while the other set of disciples branching out via Thanjavur Kamakshi Ammal, the grandmother of the famous Veena artiste Veenai Dhanammal.

One of the last contributions that T. Viswanathan and T. Sankaran made to Carnatic music was to edit the available compositions of the Anai Ayya brothers (published by Brihaddhvani).

== See also ==
- List of Carnatic composers
