= D. Srinivas =

D. Srinivas may refer to

- D. Srinivas (instrumentalist), popularly known as Veena Srinivas
- D. Srinivas (politician), Congress party politician
