= Maha Vaidyanatha Iyer =

Vaidyanatha Sivan (1844 - 1893) (Tamil: மஹா வைத்யநாத சிவன்) also referred as Maha Vaidyanatha Iyerwas a composer and vocalist of Carnatic music. He was a great exponent of extemporaneous singing. He also composed a ragamalika (garland of ragas - a song that utilises more than one raga) with all the 72 melakartha ragas.

== Early life and training ==
Sivan came to be known, was born in the village of Viyacheri in the Thanjavur district of Tamil Nadu, on 23 May 1844. His father Duraisami Iyer was also a musician and he trained Vaidyanatha Iyer as well as his other sons in Carnatic music. Vaidyanatha Iyer continued his training with some of the well-known musicians of his time, including Anai Ayya brothers. Later he continued his training under Manambuchavadi Venkatasubbayyar, one of Tyagaraja’s disciples. He was famous for his elaboration of ragas (raga alapana). Maha Vaidyanatha Sivan and his elder brother, Ramaswami Sivan, were the earliest performing duo in the history of Carnatic music as known in the last two centuries.

== Career ==
He composed mainly in Telugu and Tamil and used the mudra 'Guhadasa'. Some of his famous compositions are Pahi Mam Srirajarajeswari (Janaranjani) and Neekela dayaradu (Sarasangi). His most famous disciple was T S Sabhesha Iyer (सभेश अय्यर of पडिनैन्दुमंडप, son of Padinaindumandapa Sambasiva Iyer), who was awarded Sangita Kalanidhi. Sabhesh Iyer's disciple Musiri Subramania Iyer, popularly known as just Musiri, was also awarded the Kalanidhi title at a very young age. Many of Musiri's students, who are a part of Maha Vaidyanatha Iyer's musical lineage - Madurai Mani Iyer, M S Subbulakshmi, Smt Mani Krishnaswami, TK Govinda Rao, and the Bombay Sisters - were later awarded the coveted honour. As a teacher at Annamalai University, Sabhesh Iyer also taught future Kalanidhi recipients G.N. Balasubramaniam, K. S. Narayanaswamy, and S. Ramanathan.

The competitive element of some of the Carnatic concerts, setting off two noted musicians against each other in an adversarial rather than collaborative spirit, created needless rivalries between Maha Vaidyanatha Iyer and his contemporaries. One of them, Patnam Subramania Iyer, was his next-door neighbour in Thiruvaiyaru, and both organised guru-kula-vaasa at their homes for their students.

Vaidyanatha Ayyar died on 27 January 1893.

His namesake Konerirajapuram Vaidyanatha Ayyar, his junior by 30-35 years, was also a Carnatic vocalist. Maharajapuram Viswanatha Iyer, also a recipient of Sangeeta Kalanidhi, shares his initials 'MVI' with Maha Vaidyanatha Iyer.

== Compositions ==
Composition	Raga	Tala	Type	Language	Other Info
nIkEla daya rAdu	sarasAngi	khanDa cApu		Telugu	Credited to his brother Ramaswamy Sivan
pAhimAm SrI rAja rAjEswarI	jana ranjani	Adi		Sanskrit	Credited to his brother Ramaswamy Sivan
praNatArti hara prabhO purArE	Raga Malika	Adi		Sanskrit	72-Melakarta Raga malika
Sri shankara guru varam	Naga Swarali	Rupaka		Sanskrit	
Maha Ganapathe	Hamsadhwani	Adi		Telugu	

== See also ==
- List of Carnatic composers
