= Meghalu Cheppina Prema Katha =

2025 Indian film

- Theatrical release poster
- Directed by: Vipin
- Written by: Vipin
- Produced by: Uma Devi Kota
- Starring: Naresh Agastya; Rabiya Khatoon
- Cinematography: Mohana Krishna
- Edited by: Marthand K. Venkatesh
- Music by: Justin Prabhakaran
- Production company: Sunethra Entertainment
- Release date: 22 August 2025
- Country: India
- Language: Telugu

Meghalu Cheppina Prema Katha (transl. The love story told by the clouds) is a 2025 Indian Telugu-language romantic drama film written and directed by Vipin. It stars Naresh Agastya and Rabiya Khatoon in important roles.

The film was released on 22 August 2025.

== Cast ==
- Naresh Agastya as Varun
- Rabiya Khatoon as Meghana
- Radhika Sarathkumar as Kamakshi Shanakaramurthy, Varun’s grandmother
- Aswathi Thirunal Rama Varma as Guruji
- Suman as Mahendra, Varun’s father
- Aamani as Revathi, Varun’s mother
- Tulasi as Meghana’s mother
- Venkatesh Kakumanu as Hari, Varun’s bestfriend
- Tanikella Bharani as Hari’s uncle
- Vidyullekha Raman as Komali, Meghana’s colleague
- Raja Chembolu as Aditya, Meghana’s colleague and love-interest
- Mohan Raman as Estate Manager
- Harsha Vardhan as Meghana’s boss
- Ananth Babu as Priest
- Duvvasi Mohan as Yoga teacher
- Rajashree as Meghana’s aunt
- Viraajita as Meghana’s cousin
- Renga Prasanth as Ranga, Estate Waiter
- Narasimha Raju
- Divya Chalamasetty as Divya, Meghana’s colleague
- Ping Pong Surya as Surya, Meghana’s colleague
- Jogi Naidu as Beggar
- Sanjay Reddy as Mahendra’s friend
- Radha Krishna
- Parnika
- Nagi Jabardasth
- Prasanth
- Divya
- Karthikeya Dev
- Mrunal Varma

== Music ==
The background score and soundtrack were composed by Justin Prabhakaran.

Track listing
No.	Title	Lyrics	Singer(s)	Length
1.	"Tillana"	M. Balamuralikrishna	Aswathi Thirunal Rama Varma	2:23
2.	"Saage Nade"	Krishna Kanth	Anurag Kulkarni	3:54
3.	"Gala Gala"	Rehman	Karthik, Chinmayi Sripada	5:06
4.	"Kalaya Yashode"	Narayana Teertha	Madhushree	4:16
5.	"Sound Of Love"	Rehman	S. P. Charan, Shashaa Tirupati	4:05
6.	"Oh Megham"	Vipin	Gowtham Bharadwaj	3:41
7.	"Nuvvevaro"	Rehman	Gowtham Bharadwaj	4:15
8.	"Shobillu"	Tyagaraja	Aswathi Thirunal Rama Varma	3:34

== Release ==
Meghalu Cheppina Prema Katha was earlier scheduled to release on 17 July 2025, but later released on 22 August 2025 due to delays in production. Post-theatrical digital streaming rights were acquired by Sun NXT and premiered on 26 September 2025.

== Reception ==
Aditya Devulapally of Cinema Express rated the film 2 out of 5 and opined that the film struggled against the weight of clumsy writing. Satya Pulagam of ABP Desam too gave same rating and was critical towards slow-paced narration and writing.
