= Padmavathy Ananthagopalan =

- Born: 12 July 1934 (age 92); India
- Origin: Chennai Tamil Nadu, India
- Genre: Carnatic music
- Occupations: Musician, instrumentalist, veena
- Instrument: Veena
- Website: www.padmavathyananthagopalan.com

Padmavathy Ananthagopalan (born 12 July 1934) is a classical musician and veena maestro from India, in the Carnatic Music genre. She also plays the mridangam and the nadhaswaram. She has seven decades of experience in playing the veena.

She is known for her own unique "gayaki" style, and she has long been a major advocate for the guru-shishya (gurukula) tradition. She has been the guru for numerous artists like Jayanthi Kumaresh (veena) and Usha Rajagopalan (violin). She is also the founder of the Sri Satguru Sangita music school and has over 25 years of active teaching service through the institution.

== Early days and personal life ==
Padmavathy was initiated into music when she was five by her father Lalgudi Gopala Iyer. She learnt the nuances of playing the veena from him. Her first performance was at the age of twelve. Her ancestors are the direct disciples of one of the greatest composers of Carnatic Music, Saint Thyagaraja.

Padmavathy's spouse Ananthagopalan is also a veena and violin exponent. Ananthagopalan teaches playing these instruments to students. Her elder brother was the late violin maestro, vocalist and composer Padma Bhushan Lalgudi G. Jayaraman. Her younger sisters Lalgudi Rajalakshmi (Jayanthi Kumaresh's mother) and Lalgudi Srimathi Brahmanandam are also violinists.

== Career ==
"I am doing my bit to take the veena on a par with the vocal kutcheris in sabhas."

— Padmavathy Ananthagopalan in 2014.

Padmavathy plays the veena in the "gayaki" style wherein she delivers the nuances in the musical instrument like in the vocal rendition. Vidhwan S. Balachander was a huge influence on her and she considered him to be her "Manaseeka" guru (meaning reverentially within one's mind). She observed all the stalwarts and eventually came up with her own unique style wherein every swara is given its due in a raaga.

She is an 'A' grade artist and who features regularly in All India Radio and popular Television networks. She has set to tune and Sanskrit works such as Lalita Sahasranamam, Saundaryalahari, Mooka panchasati for the benefit of her students.

She has numerous international performances and tours to her credit. Since 1990 she has toured the United Kingdom, the United States, Malaysia and Singapore. In some of these tours she has been accompanied by Jayanthi Kumaresh.

She is currently focused on creating more talented veena artists and working towards greater acceptance of veena performances in sabhas (performance halls) that other musical instruments and vocal performances currently enjoy.

=== Books ===
She authored and published two books Shadjam and Rishabam in collaboration with the Singapore Indian Fine Arts Society for students of music. She has also authored a book for the beginners in Carnatic Music titled Abhyasa Manjari.

=== Gurukulam ===
Padmavathy is a highly respected teacher. Her students are spread across the globe and are successful performers of the veena, the violin and vocal forms. She is a big advocate of the gurkula approach for learning music. She has been teacher to numerous students and many have benefitted from the gurukul form of residential learning. Jayanthi Kumaresh, her niece and student for over 22 years, is a veena exponent. Usha Rajagopalan, a violinist, is her student. Maalavika Sundar, an upcoming classical and light music singer, is her student for over 20 years.

=== Design and Maintenance ===
"If you have a keen ear, a good grasp and a heart to put them into practice, you will be a master. Patience, grit, sacrifice and discipline are needed."

— Padmavathy Ananthagopalan on gaining mastery in music, 2014.

Padmavathy has over 30 veenas in her possession. She is very conversant with the technical nuances of the construct of the instruments and maintains them on her own. She has also made changes to the traditional methods of fixing string and replacing the frets.

She has also designed a portable veena that can be dismantled and carried in a knapsack the help of Natesa Achary. This is a helpful innovation as transporting the veena is a challenge for artists and is often seen as an impediment for locations where they artists can perform.

=== Sri Satguru Sangita Vidyalaya ===
Based on the suggestion given by vidhwan S Balachander, she established a school exclusively for music in 1988 known as Sri Sadguru Sangita Vidyalaya at Anna Nagar. She has trained more than a thousand students over the last 25 years. Students at the school go through a seven-year course that covers music theory as well.

== Awards & felicitations ==
- "Vainika Mudhra" Award at the Mudhra Veenotsav 2014
- "Veena Thathwagnya" by the Veena Foundation (New Delhi)
- TTK award by Music Academy, Chennai in 2006
- "Gaana Nidhi" award by Sri Jagadguru Veda Parayana Trust
- "Acharya Devo Bhava" - 80 birthday felicitations
