= Rugmini Gopalakrishnan =

- Smt. Rugmini Gopalakrishnan playing the Saraswati veena
- Born: 1936; Tamil Nadu, India
- Occupation: Veena artist

Rugmini Gopalakrishnan (born 1936) is a Saraswati veena artist in Carnatic music from India.

== Profile ==
Smt. Rugmini Gopalakrishnan was born in Tamil Nadu, before moving to Kerala with her family as a young girl. She is the granddaughter of Gayakashikhamani Harikesanallur Muthiah Bhagavatar. She has spent over 65 years teaching, recording and performing of Carnatic music in India and is one of the best Veena teachers in India.

She began her preliminary training in music and vocal under her uncle, Sri Nellai T.V. Krishnamoorthy, prior to receiving the Government of India Cultural Scholarship to undertake deeper studies in Carnatic music on the Saraswati veena with Padma Bhushan K. S. Narayanaswamy. In 1954, at the age of 17, Rugmini won the President's Award from the first President of India, Rajendra Prasad, at the first All India Radio (AIR) Competition for Veena at 18 years of age. She served as Professor and Head of the Department of Music in the Swathi Thirunal College of Music in Thiruvananthapuram, Kerala from 1957 to 1986. She went on to serve as Principal at Chembai Memorial Government Music College in Palakkad from 1987 to 1990.

She is a member of the Board of Studies at University of Calicut and a Member of the Audition Board of All India Radio for Delhi and Thiruvananthapuram, and the author of several Indian government commissioned books and essays on Carnatic music in the Tamil and Malayalam languages. She has been given the title A-Top Grade Artist with All India Radio, a station that has been broadcasting her Veena recitals for over 64 years starting 1954. She gives performances regularly on the national Indian television channel Doordarshan.

== Awards ==
- The President's Award from the first President of India, Dr. Rajendra Prasad at the first AIR Competition for Veena, 1954.
- Kerala Sangeetha Nataka Akademi Fellowship, 2015

== Radio and television ==
- Bestowed the title A-Top Grade Artist by All India Radio

== Discography ==
- Nadalayam: a tribute to Gayakashikamani Dr. L. Muthiah Bhagavatar
