= Lalgudi Rajalakshmi =

Indian violinist

Lalgudi Rajalakshmi is a violinist in the Indian classical Carnatic style of music. She performs the violin in the Lalgudi tradition.

== Early life and training ==
Lalgudi Rajalakshmi hails from a family of musicians. Her siblings are veena maestro Padmavathi Ananthagopalan, and violinists Lalgudi Jayaraman and Srimathi Brahmanandam. Her initial training was with her father, Lalgudi Gopala Iyer. She also learnt later from her elder brother, Lalgudi Jayaraman.

== Performance ==
Lalgudi Rajalakshmi started performing at the age of 10. Since that time, she has had both solo performances and performed as an accompanist to several artistes including Aruna Sairam, D.K. Pattammal, Mandolin Srinivas, Mani Krishnaswami, M.L. Vasanthakumari, Neyveli Santhanagopalan, N. Ramani, Radha and Jayalakshmi, Saroja and Lalitha, Sudha Raghunathan, her daughter Jayanthi Kumaresh and grandson Abhishek Raghuram, among others. She has performed in India and in several other countries including Malaysia, Singapore and the US. Lalgudi Rajalakshmi has also served as a staff artiste for All India Radio.

== Awards ==
The awards conferred upon Rajalakshmi include "Kala Jyothi" by Sri Thyagaraja Bhajana Sabha, "Sangeetha Bhushana" by Ramakrishna Bhajana Sabha, "Swarabhushani" by Gayana Samaja (2013) and the Music Academy's prestigious Pappa Venkatramaiah award (2015).

== Teaching ==
A highly regarded teacher, Lalgudi Rajalakshmi has trained students in the violin, veena and in vocal music. Her students include the veena artiste Jayanthi Kumaresh.
