= Mangalam Muthuswamy =

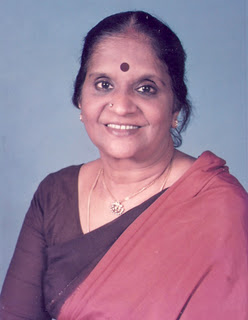
Mangalam Muthuswami (1937-2007)

Mangalam Muthuswamy (1937–2007) was a notable vainika from India. Mangalam was born in a musical family at Sivaganga. She received initial training in the Veena from her own mother, Smt. Lakshmibai Ammal, a disciple of Sri Pallavi Ramaswamy Raju.

Mangalam was known for her 'gayika' style, where the Veena virtually imitates the human voice and is hence extremely pleasing to hear. She was the prime disciple of 'Veenai Visalakshi'(regarded as the 'Taanam' expert), who was the disciple of 'shatkala chakravarti' Veena Venkatramana Das of Vijayanagaram & also Veenai Dhanammal. Mangalam had the rare distinction of playing the Indian national anthem on the veena in the presence of R. Venkatraman, the former President of India.

Association with Radio and TV Networks

Mangalam gave her maiden performance on the All India Radio at the age of 11. This was the year 1948. Then, over a period of 2 decades, she continued performing at the AIR and eventually earned an "A" grade. An artiste of great repute, she has also performed at important programmes of the AIR, including the Radio Sangeet Sammelan in 1994. She also went on to become a performing artiste at the Doordarshan Kendra, Mumbai.

She also went on to play for several TV documentaries, the most important being, the "Abode of God".
