= E. Gayathri =

Indian musician

Echampati Gayathri
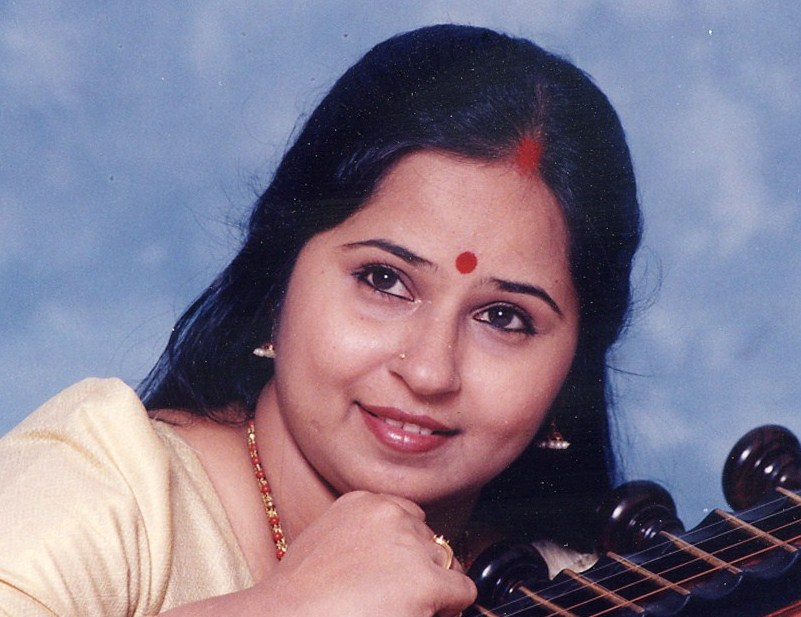

Background information
- Origin: Andhra Pradesh, India
- Genres: Indian classical music, film music
- Occupation: Veena player
- Instrument: Veena

Echampati Gayathri (née Gayathri Vasantha Shoba), popularly known as "Veena Gayathri"(born 9 November 1959) is a veena exponent of the traditional Carnatic music. She was appointed by the Chief Minister of Tamil Nadu, J.Jayalalithaa, as the first Vice Chancellor of Tamil Nadu Music and Fine Arts University in November, 2013.

E.Gayathri received the Sangeet Natak Akademi Award in 2002, the "Kalaimamani" award from Dr. M. G. R. on behalf of the Government of Tamil Nadu in 1984 and a Lifetime Achievement Award from the Rotary Club, Madras East in 2011. The Chief Minister of Tamil Nadu, J. Jayalalithaa, appointed E. Gayathri as Honorary Director of Tamil Nadu Government Music Colleges in Chennai, Thiruvaiyaru, Madurai and Coimbatore in 2011. E.Gayathri has been honoured with a Doctorate by the World Tamil University in the year 2017.

== Career ==
E. Gayathri was born on 9 November 1959 to Kamala Aswathama, a veena vidushi, and to G. Aswathama, a film music director in the Telugu film industry. Her father named her Gayathri Vasantha Shoba. Gayathri first trained under her parents and later under Sangita Kalanidhi T. M. Thyagarajan, a Carnatic vocalist and composer. She also learned under violin player M S Gopalakrishnan.

Gayathri married E V Ramakrishna (1950-2021), a Marine Engineer, in 1979. He died during the covid-19 epidemic in May 2021. The couple has two daughters.

Gayathri began her career at the age of 9 when Sri Parthasarathy Swami Sabha, Triplicane invited her to perform in their Saint Thyagaraja Festival in 1968. Gayathri went on to receive awards and titles from organisations in India and abroad. Gayathri has released many albums. She was appointed as Honorary Director of Tamil Nadu Government Music Colleges (in Chennai, Thiruvaiyaru, Madurai and Coimbatore) by the Chief Minister of Tamil Nadu, J. Jayalalithaa, in 2011. E.Gayathri has been honoured with Doctorate by the World Tamil University in the year 2017.

Apart from these, she has also given performances abroad, in the United States, United Kingdom, France, Germany, Singapore and Malaysia to name a few. She was also one of the many well-known artistes of India to have been featured in composer A.R. Rahman's Jana Gana Mana anthem track. She also sing a song "marakathaan ninaikiren" for a movie also.

== Awards ==
- Senior Grade-awarded by All India Radio at the age of 13; without audition in recognition of prodigious talents, in 1973.
- 'Kalaimamani', Tamil Nadu state award from Dr. M. G. R. in 1984.
- 'Sangeet Natak Akademi' award from Dr. Abdul Kalam in 2002.
- 'Kumara Gandharva' award from Madhya Pradesh Government in 1999.
- Sangeetha Kalasikhamani, 2001 by The Indian Fine arts Society, Chennai.
- 'Sangeetha Kalasarathy', from Sri Parthasarathy Swami Sabha in 2009.
- 'Lifetime Achievement' award from Rotary East Chennai in 2011.

== Sources ==
- Gayathri, E. (9 July 2009). "The Defining Moment!". Jasmine Strings.
