= Jaysri-Jeyaraaj =

Indian musicians

Jaysri Jeyaraaj and Jeyaraaj Krishnan are artists, who play the South Indian musical instrument Veena.

== Lineage ==
They are directly descendants of the line of students of the well-known composer, Muthuswami Dikshitar, who is one of the Trinity of Carnatic composers.

== Current work ==
Their residence is in Chennai, India and they regularly give concerts and hold chamber concerts. They are working on a compilation of recordings of all available songs of Muthuswami Dikshitar.

== See also ==
- Saraswati Veena
