= Misr veena =

Plucked string musical instrument

Misr Veena
String instrument
- Classification: String instruments
- Inventor: Suvir Misra

Related instruments
- Rudra veena; Saraswati veena; Surbahar; Chitra veena; Vichitra veena

Musicians
- Suvir Misra

Misr veena (Sanskrit: मिश्र वीणा, IPA: [mɪɕɽɐ ʋiːɳɐ]) is a plucked stringed musical instrument of Indian origin.

== Etymology and history ==
The tradition of veena playing was becoming extinct in Hindustani music except for dhrupad, where the rudra veena was in use. The misr veena was created by Suvir Misra to re-introduce veenas to the Hindustani classical music concert scene. But molding a Saraswati veena into the Hindustani style was not an easy task. After years of experimentation, he came up a new veena, which is a hybrid of a Saraswati veena and a Rudra veena. He called it misr veena which means hybrid veena or mixed veena. A misr veena can be tuned to dhrupad, khayal and thumri. The specialty of the misr veena, according to Suvir Misra, is that the fast tanas of khayal comes out more beautifully through it.

== General Layout ==
The bowl (tabli) of the misr veena is made of rosewood (tun) and its resonator (tomba) is made of gourd to reduce weight. The instrument has 20 movable bell metal frets and these helps in playing sudha and komal notes. There are seven steel strings, out of which five are playing strings and the remaining two are drone (chikari) strings. The number of sympathetic strings (tarab) is eleven, and helps to keep the strummer in tune while playing gamak.

=== Difference from Saraswati veenas and Rudra veenas ===
The bridge is open (khuli) in a Saraswati veena and has a slight curve to inculcate a nasal quality, while the Rudra veena's bridge is closed (band), so that a deep resonant sound can be gained. The misr veena has a medium bridge (jawari) to impart both a nasal and a deep resonance quality to the sound.

== Playing ==
The misr veena is played with three fingers. Suvir Misra has developed a unique fingering method which helps in playing fast tanas using gamakas and meends.

== See also ==
- List of string instruments
