= Suvir Misra =

- Born: Harda, India
- Occupations: Musician; Vocalist; Musicologist
- Musical career
- Genre: Indian classical music
- Instruments: Rudra Veena; Saraswati Veena; Surbahar; Misr veena

Suvir Misra (Sanskrit: सुवीर मिश्र, IPA: [sʊʋiːɽ mɪɕɽɐ]) is an Indian player of Rudra Veena, Saraswati Veena, and Surbahar. He is unique in being a left handed artist who has mastered all the three veenas of the Indian classical music - the Rudra Veena, the Saraswati Veena and the Surbahar. He is the inventor of Misr Veena.

== Early life ==
Suvir Misra was born in Harda, Madhya Pradesh and belongs to a family of musicians. He has studied at Delhi Public School, Mathura Road. He started his journey into music at the age of 12.

== Personal life ==
He joined Civil Services of India in 1993, and currently is working as a Commissioner of Customs, Customs and Central Excise, Mumbai

== Career ==
Suvir was trained in the Rudra Veena by Zia Fariduddin Dagar and simultaneously studied dhrupad from Nirmalya Dey. He learnt the Gwalior gharana singing style from K.N.Ienger and learnt sitar from N.R.Rama Rao. He studied tabla under Bandu Khan of Ajrara gharana. Suvir found inspiration in Veena from S. Balachander of the Karnatic tradition.

He believes that older themes in classical music don't have much importance to modern Indian living and, to popularize classical music, contemporary themes should be used. For this he introduced modern Hindi mukta chhanda poetry within Dhrupad composition structure, and also used newer themes in Hindi literature instead of traditional Awadhi language or Braj Bhasha.

Suvir Misra plays and also makes the Rudra Veena. Suvir has performed on various platforms within India.

== Significant works ==
- His efforts have brought back Karnatic Saraswathi Veena into the mainstream Hindustani classical music scene.
- He has also developed a unique fingering style to play fast taans of Khayal.
- He is the inventor of Misr Veena.
- Suvir Misra has been trying to bring extinct Veenas, like Jantari, Kinnari etc., back to life.

== Musical style ==
Suvir prefer to play the Rudra Veena, Saraswati Veena and Surbahar in the Gayaki Ang (Vocal Style). This style integrates all the subtle characteristics of the human voice into the performance.
