= Punya Srinivas =

Indian veena player and vocalist

Punya Srinivas புண்ய ஸ்ரீனிவாஸ்
- Born: India
- Genre: Carnatic
- Occupation: Musician
- Instruments: Veena; vocals
- Member of: Paanchajanyam

Punya Srinivas (Tamil: புண்ய ஸ்ரீனிவாஸ்) is a professional veena player and vocalist.

She was initiated into music from the age of six by Smt. Jayalakshmi from the Music Academy and was later on trained in veena from Vidushi Smt. Kamala Ashwathama, the mother of renowned veena artiste E. Gayathri. She is currently pursuing the advanced aspects of Carnatic music from Sangeeta Kala Acharya Suguna Varadachari. She was also exposed to Western classical music by Dr Augustine Paul. Her husband, D. A. Shrinivas, is an accomplished mridangam player who usually accompanies her in her concerts.

== Career ==
She was proclaimed an 'A' Grade Artiste of All India Radio when she was 20 years old. Having performed in all the major sabhas in Chennai, she also extended her performances to Hyderabad, Trivandrum, Bangalore, Bombay, Delhi and Calcutta, and also abroad in Europe, Belgium, the United States, Singapore, France, Israel, New York, London, Dubai and Jerusalem.

She performed with Ravi Shankar, the world-famous sitar maestro, on his album Chants, produced by George Harrison.

She has also collaborated with Zakir Hussain, John McLaughlin, Matt Garrison and U. Srinivas.

She has also played with the singer Hariharan on his ghazal albums and for Colonial Cousins for one of their albums.

To date, she has released 5000 recordings as a veena player. She is also known for her versatility and ambidexterity and has recently performed Bach's double violin concerto with violinist V. S. Narasimhan. She also composed a tune for Asian Muse, a conceptual Japanese album comprising women performers from different regions of Asia. With her band, Paanchajanyam, she has brought many different popular musical genres on the veena.

She released the album Veena in Vienna, giving different dimension to the veena and became a global hit. She followed it up with the album Sound of Swan.

In 2006, She also performed the veena part in the song "Bhavamaiyna" from the Telugu feature film Pournami.
