= Ranganayaki Rajagopalan =

Saraswati veena player (1932–2018)

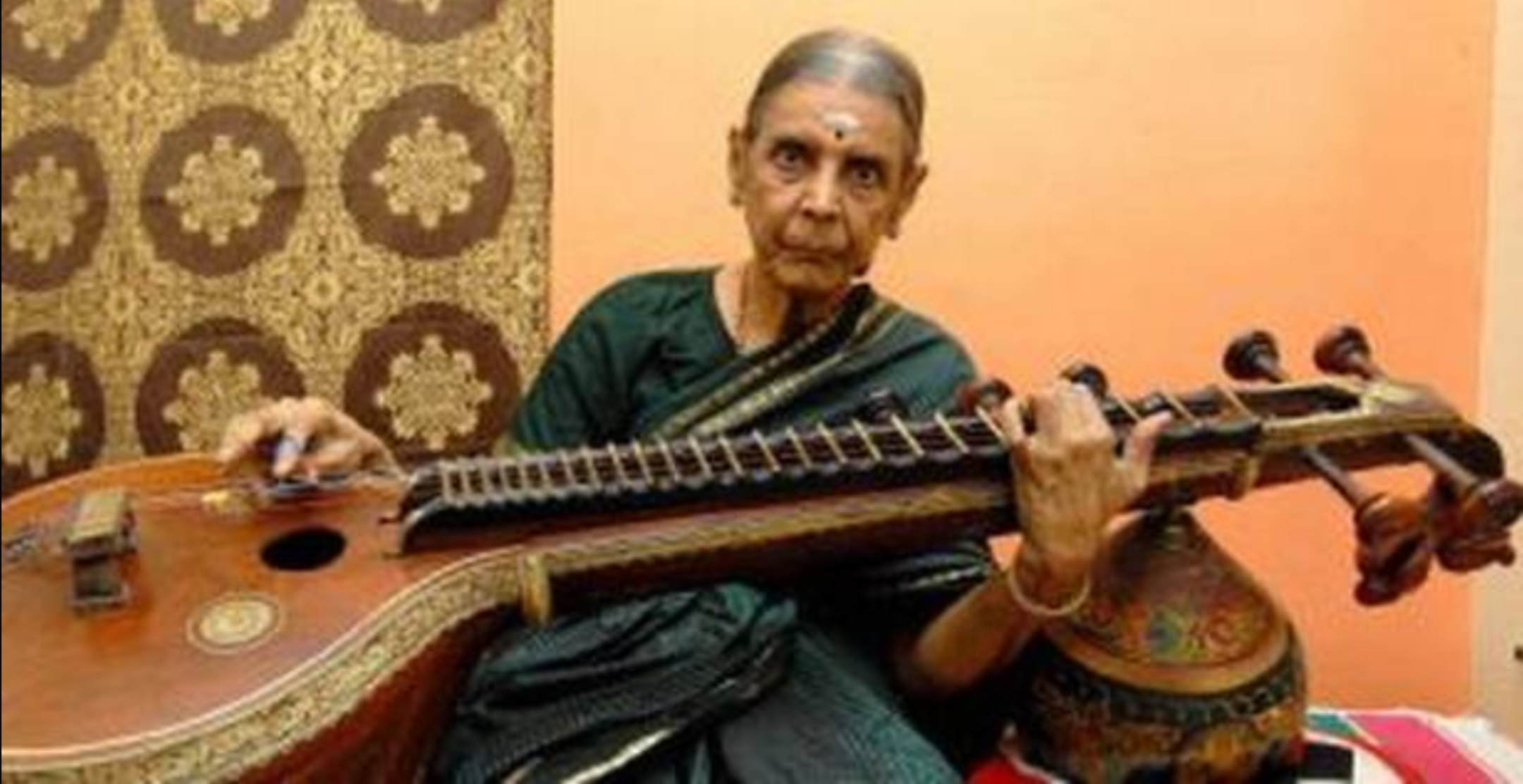
Kalaimamani Veenai Smt. Ranganayaki Rajagopalan

Ranganayaki Rajagopalan (3 May 1932 – 20 September 2018) was a veena instrumentalist, recipient of the Kalaimamani and winner of a Presidential Award for Carnatic Instrumental Music.

== Early life and background ==
Ranganayaki came under the tutelage of Sangeetha Kalanidhi Karaikudi Sambasiva Iyer at the early age of two and started training in the strict Gurukula system, until the death of Sambasiva Iyer in 1958.

== Career ==
Her first performance was in aid of the Congress building at Madras and held in Karaikudi under the President-ship of the veteran Congressman Subramaniam who belonged to Karaikudi.

In 1952, she accompanied her Guru Sambasiva Iyer to the 26th Silver Jubilee Celebrations of the Madras Music Academy (commonly known as Music Academy) and was presented with a Silver casket by the Sri Prakasa, the former Governor of Madras.

In 1970, she was selected as the best veena player by the Music Academy and was presented with a veena by the then Governor of Mysore Dharma Veera.

In 1979, she was awarded the title of "Kalaimamani" by the then Chief Minister of Tamil Nadu M. G. Ramachandran.

On 26 January 1984, she was conferred the title "Veena Visaradha" in a felicitation ceremony conducted under the auspices of Balasubramania Sabha. Her collection is part of the UNESCO Collection of Traditional Music.
