= Workshop (disambiguation) =

A workshop is a room or building which provides both the area and tools required for the manufacture or repair of manufactured goods.

Workshop may also refer to:

== Brief, collaborative, creative activity ==
- Charrette, an intense period of design or planning activity
- Writing circle, a gathering of writers for critique and inspiration
- Training workshop
- Organization workshop
- Acting workshop
- an academic workshop, a smaller version of an academic conference
- a meeting in which groups apply methods for creative problem-solving

== Arts and entertainment ==
- Steam Workshop, a service for sharing user-made modifications to video games available on Steam
- The Workshop (film), 2017 French film
- The Workshop (play), a 2017 Off-Broadway play
- "The Workshop" (Smash), an episode of Smash
- "Workshop" (The Beach Boys song)
- Workshop (web series), a video series focusing on struggling actors' lives
- Workshop Jazz Records, Motown's jazz subsidiary, active from 1962 to 1964
- Workshop production, a type of theatre performance
- Workshop of the Telescopes, an album by Blue Öyster Cult

== Other uses ==
- Workshop (juggling)
- Workshop system, a means of subcontracting piecework to small scale craft operations, such as blacksmiths

== See also ==
- Sheltered workshop, an organization or environment that employs people with disabilities separately from others
- Automobile repair shop
