= Murder of Prashanth Poojary =

- Location: Moodabidri, Karnataka, India
- Date: 9 October 2015; 7:00 (IST)
- Weapon: Knife
- Deaths: 1

On 9 October 2015, Prashanth Poojary, a Hindu man from the town of Moodabidri in Dakshina Kannada, Karnataka, was killed by Muslim extremists.

Poojary, a 29-year-old flower seller and a member of Bajrang Dal, was stabbed with blades by six assailants at about 7.00 am IST. As of 29 October 2015, ten people have been arrested in connection with the attack, allegedly motivated by Poojary's activism against the illegal slaughter of cows. One suspect Mohammad Imtiaz Gantalkatte was arrested from Mumbai airport as he was attempting to flee India for Dubai.

An eyewitness to the incident, 60-year-old Vaman Poojary, a tender coconut seller whose shop was opposite Poojary's shop, went missing on 15 October 2015. He was found dead on the next day. It has been alleged by Nalin Kumar Kateel MP from Dakshina Kannada constituency to which the town of Moodabidri belongs that witnesses were being threatened over international phone calls including those made from Pakistan and asked not to testify against the suspects. The Karnataka government also revealed that its minister Abhayachandra Jain received threats Karnataka police consider this murder as a part of a conspiracy to incite communal hatred in the region.

Vishwesha Teertha head of the Sri Pejavara Adokshaja Matha has asserted bias on the part of a section of writers for their selective outrage to criminal incidents exemplified by their silence on Poojary's killing.

== Aftermath ==
One Mohammed Imtiyaz (Accused in the murder of Prashanth Poojary & accused in several illegal cattle transport cases) a resident of Kallabettu in Moodbidri was attacked a little after 6 AM by a group of nine, at a hotel in Moodbidri. The nine accused in this case are yet to be identified.

Shortly after the attack, a photograph surfaced of Karnataka Legislative Assembly Member and politician for the Indian National Congress, Abhaychandra Jain, with one of the accused in the murder.

== See also ==
- Murder of Lalit Jain
- Kamlesh Tiwari
- Murder of Kanhaiya Lal
- Murder of Samuel Paty
