= Madura College =

Academic Institution

Coordinates: 9.911°N 78.108°E

The Madura College
- மதுரைக்கல்லூரி
- Motto: "Learning Shines with Righteousness"
- Type: Public
- Established: 1856
- Affiliations: Madurai Kamaraj University
- Principal: Dr. J. Suresh
- Location: Madurai, Tamil Nadu, India
- Campus: 43 acres (170,000 m^{2}) Urban
- Website: maduracollege.edu.in

The Madura College established in 1856, is one of the oldest academic institutions in Madurai, India. It is an autonomous arts and science college affiliated to the Madurai Kamaraj University.

== History ==
The college started as a Zilla School in 1856 as an outcome of Wood's despatch of 1854. In 1880, a college Department was added under the affiliation of the University of Madras. The School and the College Departments were both taken over by 'Madura Native School Committee' and renamed itself as the 'Madura Committee' in 1889.

== Academic programmes ==
The Madura College offers undergraduates and postgraduate programmes in arts and science affiliated to the Madurai Kamaraj University. The college has been accredited by National Assessment and Accreditation Council with the "A" Grade (CGPA 3.15 out of 4).

== Departments ==
- Tamil
- Sanskrit
- Hindi
- English
- Sociology
- Philosophy
- Economics
- Mathematics
- Physics
- Chemistry
- Computer Science
- Zoology
- Botany
- Commerce
- Information Technology
- Bio-Technology
- Micro-Biology

== Extension activities ==
The college offers the following outreach programmes:

- National Service Scheme
- National Cadet Crops
- Youth Red Cross
- Red Ribbon Club
- Adult Education and Extension Programme
- Physical Education

== Alumni Association ==
- Sri T. S. Rajam, former President of the Madras Music Academy
- Shri Jana Krishnamurthi
