= Prashanth Iyengar =

Prashant Iyengar
- Born: 12 January 1973 (age 53); India
- Origin: Karnataka, India
- Genre: Carnatic music
- Occupations: Musician, instrumentalist, veena
- Instrument: Veena
- Website: www.theveena.com

Prashanth Iyengar (born 12 January 1973) is a classical musician and veena exponent from India, in the Carnatic Music genre. He is a performer, composer and teacher. He is the first composer from Karnataka to have composed Varnams in all the '72 Melakarta Ragas. He holds the Limca national record for his marathon veena concert spanning 24 hours at Srirangapatna Temple in the year 2011.

== Early days and personal life ==
Prashanth's mother Vid. Padmasini Narasimhachar was his first veena guru who followed the Mysore Veena Subbanna tradition. At the age of seven, he could play keertanas like Endaro Mahanubahulu. He later studied under Vid. R. K. Suryanarayana. He has a bachelor's degree in Pharmacy and a Diploma in Computer Engineering.

== Career ==
He worked as the in-charge of the music department in the Directorate of Textbooks, Government of Karnataka. He later went on to become a full-time musician.

His style is known for its rich gamakas along with a rendition that brings out the purity and clarity of notes.

He holds the Limca national record for the rendition of a marathon veena concert spanning 24 hours at the Srirangapatna Temple in the year 2011. He was accompanied by Vid. Ravishankar Sharma (Mridangam), Vid. K S Krishnaprasad (Ghatam) and Vid. D V Prasanna Kumar (Kanjira, Morsing and rhythm pad).

=== Compositions ===
Prashanth is a prolific composer who has composed 90 varnas that include the 72 of them in each of the melakarta ragas. He is the first composer from Karnataka to have composed Varnams in all the 72 Melakarta Ragas and second youngest after Dr M. Balamuralikrishna to compose. He has also composed 20 kritis, 10 devaranamas and five thillanas.

=== Other contributions ===
Prashanth has authored a book "Varna Lakshana Ranjani" which has the 72-mela varnas and 72 Geethes. The book is published in Kannada, English and Hindi and is hand written by his first guru and mother Vid. Padmasini Narasimhachar.

He started the Sree Rama Centre of Performing Arts for teaching students music appreciation, the art of the veena and vocal renditions.

== Awards & felicitations ==
- Limca national record marathon veena concert spanning 24 hours at Srirangapatna Temple (2011).
