= D. Srinivas (instrumentalist) =

Veena Srinivas
- Born: 12 September 1968 (age 57)
- Genres: Carnatic music
- Instrument: veena
- Years active: 1980–present
- Website: www.veenasrinivas.com

D. Srinivas, also known as Veena Srinivas (born 12 September 1968) is an Indian veena player of Carnatic music.

== Early life and background ==
Srinivas was born in Hyderabad, Andhra Pradesh, to Tulasi, a popular veena player. He travels extensively for his concerts.

== Career ==
Srinivas gave his maiden concert at the age of 9 for All India Radio, Hyderabad. He is a Veena artist and received Ugadi Visishta puraskaram by the chief minister of Andhra Pradesh. Performing Veena concerts all over India and Abroad since 25 years. He is the only Veena artist who performed at the UN.

== Awards and honours ==
- Emani Sankara Sastry award
- Chittibabu Memorial award
- Gidigu Lalitha Memorial award
- Ugadi Visishta Puraskaram from Government of Andhra Pradesh.

=== Titles ===
- Veena Vidhwamani
- Veena Praveena
- Raaga Sudhakara
- Vainika Ratna
- Vainika Samraat
- Vainika Chakravarthy
- Veena Sambrahma

== Discography ==
- Tyagaraja Krithis on Veena
- Indian Classical Ringtones
