= Vaiyacheri =

- village
- Country: India
- State: Tamil Nadu
- District: Thanjavur
- Taluk: Papanasam

Population (2001)
  - Total: 890

Languages
  - Official: Tamil
- Time zone: UTC+5:30 (IST)

Vaiyacheri is a village in the Papanasam taluk of Thanjavur district, Tamil Nadu, India.

== Demographics ==
As per the 2006 census, Vaiyacheri had a total population of 890 with 431 males and 459 females. The sex ratio was 1065. The literacy rate was 77.16.

Agriculture is the main activity in the village.
