= R. Pichumani Iyer =

Musician

R. Pichumani Iyer (18 May 1920 - 20 June 2015) was a renowned veena vidwan from Tiruchirapalli. He was the winner of the prestigious Kalaimamani award. Hailing from a prominent music family, Pichumani's career started when he was just 10 years old. A mentor to many carnatic musicians, he died in June 2015.
