= Karaikudi Sambasiva Iyer =

- Born: 1888; Thirukokarnam, Tamil Nadu
- Died: 1958 (aged 69–70)
- Genre: Carnatic music
- Occupation: instrumentalist
- Instrument: Veena

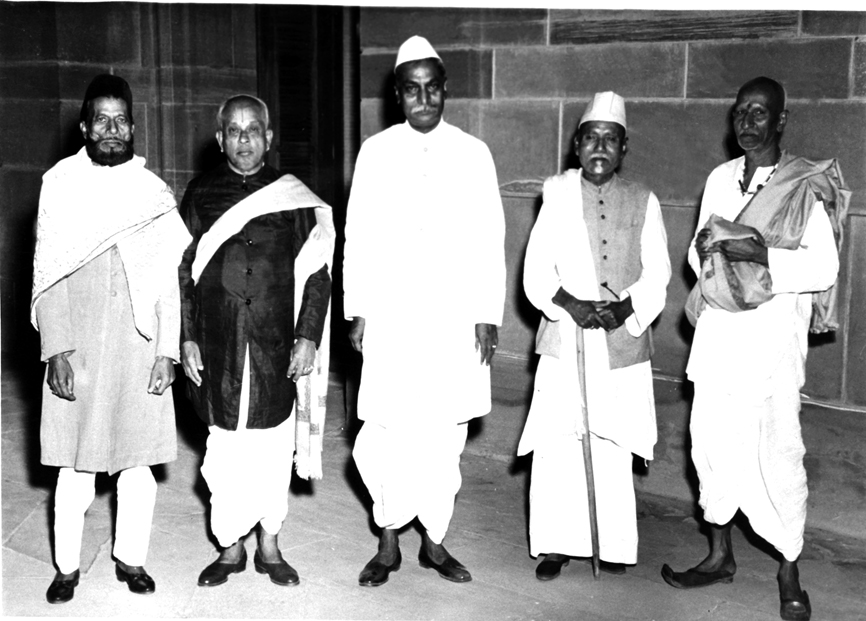
Sambasiva Iyer (first one from the right) received The Musician award from President Rajendra Prasad (r) in 1952.

Karaikudi Sambasiva Iyer (1888 - 1958) was a renowned Indian classical musician and Veena player.

In 1952, he was among the first recipients of the Sangeet Natak Akademi Fellowship, the highest honour conferred by the Sangeet Natak Akademi, India's National Academy for Music, Dance and Drama.

== Early life ==
Sambasiva Iyer was born in 1888 in Tirugokarnam, Pudukottai district, as the second son to Veena Vidwan Subbiah Iyer. He learnt to play Veena from his father, alongside his elder brother, Subbarama Iyer. The two brothers were part of the seventh generation to uphold the family's unbroken Veena tradition. Known as the "Karaikudi brothers", they enjoyed an unbroken career from their debut in their teens to the year 1934. Sambasiva Iyer was known for his tremendous hard work or "Asura Sadhaka". His mastery over the instrument was perfect and he constantly toiled to preserve the purity of the knowledge he obtained from his ancestors.

Sambasiva Iyer did not have any children. However, as he lived in a patriarchal society, he found it necessary to pass on the family legacy through a male member of the family. In 1957, he adopted Karaikudi S. Subramanian, who was the son of Subbarama Iyer's 3rd daughter Lakshmi Ammal.

== Career ==
He taught and lived at Kalakshetra, a noted arts institution in Chennai.

He was awarded the first Sangeet Natak Akademi Award for Veena in 1952, given by the Sangeet Natak Akademi. Also in the same year, he was awarded the Sangita Kalanidhi Award, one of the highest awards in Carnatic music, given by Madras Music Academy.

He died in 1958.

Amongst his noted disciples are Kalaimamani and President's award winner (late) Ranganayaki Rajagopalan, Rajeshwari Padmanabhan, Jayalakshmi Sugumar and Karaikudi Subramhanian.

Karaikudi Sambasiva Iyer is not to be confused with his namesake musician Padinaindumandapa Sambasiva Iyer. PSI was much older, and guru to two recipients of Sangeet Kalanidhi award : Muthiah Bhagavatar, and his (PSI's) son Sabhesha (सभेश) Iyer.

== Bibliography ==
- Birth Centenary of Sangita Kalanidhi Karaikudi Sambasiva Iyer 1888-1988. India International Rural Cultural Centre. 1988.
