= K. S. Narayanaswamy =

- Born: 1914; Palghat, Kerala
- Died: December 9, 1999 Chennai, Tamil Nadu, India
- Genre: Indian classical music
- Occupation: Veena player
- Instrument: Veena

K. S. Narayanaswamy, (full name Koduvayur Sivarama Iyer Narayanaswamy; 27 September 1914 – 1999) was a Carnatic veena exponent of the Thanjavur style, in which nuances and subtleties are given more importance over rhythm based acrobatics. He was awarded the Madras Music Academy's Sangeetha Kalanidhi in 1979.

== Personal Life ==
K. S. Narayanaswamy was born on 27 September 1914 to Narayaniammal and Koduvayur Sivarama Iyer at Koduvayur in Palghat district in Kerala.

== Career ==
He underwent initial training in Carnatic music under K.S. Krishna Iyer, his brother, between his seventh and fourteenth years. Later, he joined the Music College at Annamalai University in Chidambaram where he learnt vocal music under stalwarts like Sangeetha Kalanidhi T S Sabesa Iyer and Sangeetha Kalanidhi Tanjore Ponniah Pillai, descendant of the famous Tanjore Quartet. He also learnt the veena under Desamangalam Subramania Iyer and the mridangam under Tanjore Ponniah Pillai. From 1937 to 1946, he served as the lecturer at the Annamalai University, his alma mater, and assisted in publishing the Tamil kritis of Gopalakrishna Bharathi, Neelakanta Sivan and Arunachala Kavi.

Upon the invitation of His Highness, the Maharaja of Travancore, he took up lectureship in veena at the Swathi Thirunal College of Music (erstwhile Swathi Thirunal Music Academy) at Thiruvananthapuram, Kerala. During his tenure at the academy, he was instrumental, along with Semmangudi Srinivasa Iyer, then principal of the academy, in editing and publishing the kritis of Swathi Thirunal Rama Varma (commonly known as Swathi Thirunal). He participated in several international conferences and was a member of the Music and Cultural Delegations to the erstwhile USSR and East European countries in 1954. In 1970, he was invited by Yehudi Menuhin to attend the Bath International Music Festival and perform at London, Bristol, Oxford, Cambridge, and Birmingham. Later, he succeeded Semmangudi Srinivasa Iyer as the principal of the academy and retired in 1970.

In 1970, he came to Mumbai, as the principal of the Sangeetha Vidyalaya of Shanmukhananda Fine Arts and Sangeetha Sabha and taught both vocal music and veena till 1985. In 1974, he took part as the teacher of Carnatic music and veena at the Eleventh Conference of International Society of Music Education at Perth, Australia. He also participated in the Indian Music and Dance Festival of the International Institute for Comparative Music Studies and Documentation at Berlin in 1977.

Among his disciples, notable ones include Rugmini Gopalakrishnan, Kalyani Sharma, Saraswati Rajagopalan, Trivandrum Venkataraman, Aswathi Thirunal Rama Varma, Geetha Raja, Nirmala Parthasarathy, Jayashree Aravind. Many musicians like M.S. Subbulakshmi and Semmangudi Srinivasa Iyer have had good association with him and have appreciated his music.

== Awards ==
- 1962: Recipient the Kerala Sangeetha Nataka Akademi Award..
- 1968: Received title of Kalaimamani Award by the Government of Tamil Nadu, which is the highest state honour in the field of Arts.
- 1968: Received the National Award of Central Sangeet Natak Akademi..
- 1977: Received the Padma Bhushan from the Government of India.
- 1979: Received the Sangeetha Kalanidhi from the Madras Music Academy, Chennai.
- 1991: Received the Kerala Sangeetha Nataka Akademi Fellowship..
- 1999: Received the Swathi Ratna in 1999.
