= Tamil Nadu Music and Fine Arts University =

Fine arts school in Adyar, India

The Tamil Nadu Dr. J. Jayalalithaa Music and Fine Arts University
- Former names: Tamil Nadu Music and Fine Arts University
- Motto: Practice Makes Perfect
- Type: Public
- Established: November 14, 2013; 12 years ago
- Founder: J. Jayalalithaa
- Affiliations: UGC
- Chancellor: Chief Minister of Tamil Nadu
- Vice-Chancellor: Dr. S. Sowmya
- Location: Adyar, Chennai, Tamil Nadu, India; 13.009947°N 80.218228°E
- Campus: Urban
- Website: tnjjmfau.in

The Tamil Nadu Dr. J. Jayalalithaa Music and Fine Arts University (TNJMFAU), formerly and commonly known as Tamil Nadu Music and Fine Arts University (TNMFAU), is a government music and fine arts university situated in Adyar in the southern part of the city of Chennai, Tamil Nadu, India. It is about 15 km (9.3 mi) from the Chennai International Airport and about 10 km (6.2 mi) from the Puratchi Thalaivar Dr. M.G. Ramachandran Central Railway Station. It is one of the premier music and fine arts universities, named after the former chief minister of Tamil Nadu J. Jayalalithaa.

== History ==
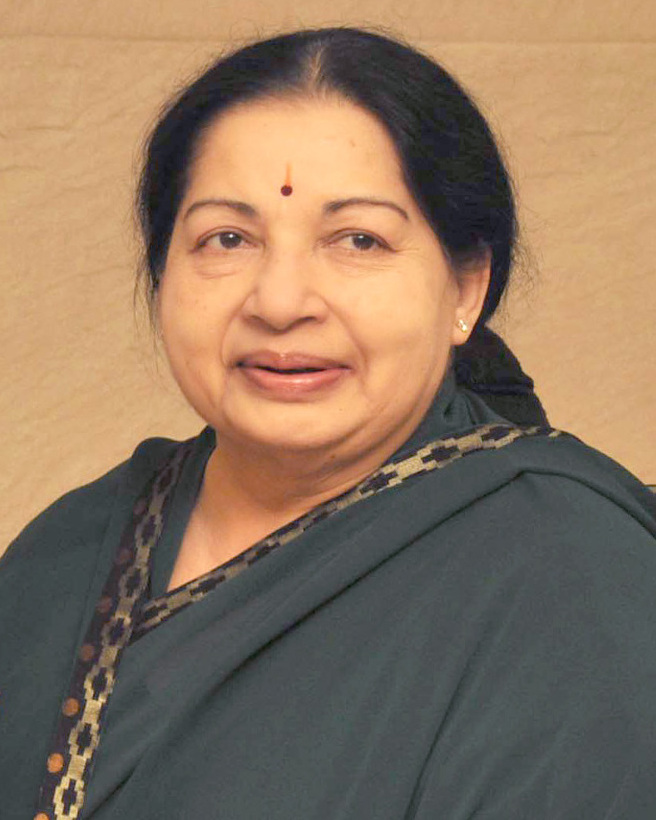
J. Jayalalithaa

The members of the High Level Committee of music and arts submitted the proposals to the former Chief Minister of Tamil Nadu J. Jayalalithaa in the presence of N. R. Sivapathi, former Minister for Art and Culture Department of Tamil Nadu in 2012 to start a separate music and arts university in Tamil Nadu.

The Tamil Nadu Music and Fine Arts University Act, 2013 received the assent of the former President of India Pranab Mukherjee in 2013. The university was established on 14 November 2013, exclusively for Music and Fine Arts so as to preserve, foster, popularize and propagate the Fine Arts and performing arts, such as Indian Music, Bharatanatyam, Painting and Sculpture. This affiliating University started functioning from July 2014 and is governed by the said Act. By 2019, It was named after the former chief minister of Tamil Nadu J. Jayalalithaa through The Tamil Nadu Dr. J. Jayalalithaa Music and Fine Arts University, Chennai Act, 2019 by the former chief minister of Tamil Nadu Edappadi K. Palaniswami.

The Tamil Nadu Dr. J. Jayalalithaa Music and Fine Arts University is the only Music and Fine Arts University in Tamil Nadu capable of granting affiliation to new Music, Dance and Fine Arts colleges, government or self - financing; and awarding degrees (also note that until 1988, all degrees of Music, Dance and Fine Arts in Tamil Nadu were awarded by the University of Madras).

Mission of the University The University strive for the development of music and fine arts and for the furtherance of the advancement of learning, along with research, documentation, publishing of audio, video recording and popularizing of all branches of music, fine arts and performing arts in the State of Tamil Nadu.

== Courses offered in the University ==
M.A in VOCAL, NAGASWARAM, VEENA, VIOLIN, MRIDANGAM, BHARATHANATYAM. M.F.A in PAINTING, VISUAL COMMUNICATION DESIGN. M.Phil in Music, Dance and Fine Arts. Ph.D in Fine Art, Music and Dance.

== Affiliated Institutions ==
Tamil Nadu Government Music College - Chennai, Tamil Nadu Government Music College - Madurai, Tamil Nadu Government Music College - Coimbatore, Tamil Nadu Government Music College - Thanjavur.

Government College of Fine Arts - Chennai, Government College of Fine Arts - Kumbakkonam, Government College of Architecture and Sculpture - Mamallapuram and M.G.R. Government Film and Television Institute - Chennai.

Government aided Colleges: 1. Kalai Kaviri College of Fine Arts - Tiruchirappalli, 2. Sri Sathguru Sangeetha Vidyalayam - Madurai.

Self-Financing Colleges: 1.Raviraj College of Fine Arts - Coimbatore, 2.Bharatham - Chennai, 3. Rani Lady Meiyyammai Achi Tamil Music College - Madurai, 4. Sri Annai Kamakshi Music & Fine Arts College - Chennai, 5. Sri Thiyagaraja College of Music - Marthandam, 6. Palme Deor Film & Media College - Thanjavur, 7. Palme Deor Film & Media College - Chennai, 8. Alagappa College of Performing Arts Academy - Karaikudi, 9. Chennai Film Industrial School - Chennai, 10. Tamil Isai Kalloori - Chennai, 11. Bridge Academy for Fine Arts - Chennai, 12. McGan's Ooty College of Architectural Design - Ooty, 13. M.E.T College of Fine Arts - Kanyakumari, 14. Kalalaya College of Music & Fine Arts - Rameswaram (Kalalaya Centre For Performing Arts and Cultural Studies).

== Administration ==
The Chancellor and Pro-chancellor of the university are the Chief Minister and the Minister for Art and Culture Department of Tamil Nadu respectively. The Vice-Chancellor is the main academic officer and administrator in its everyday functioning of the university who is appointed by the Government of Tamil Nadu.
