= Aswathi Thirunal Rama Varma =

Indian classical musician

Prince Rama Varma
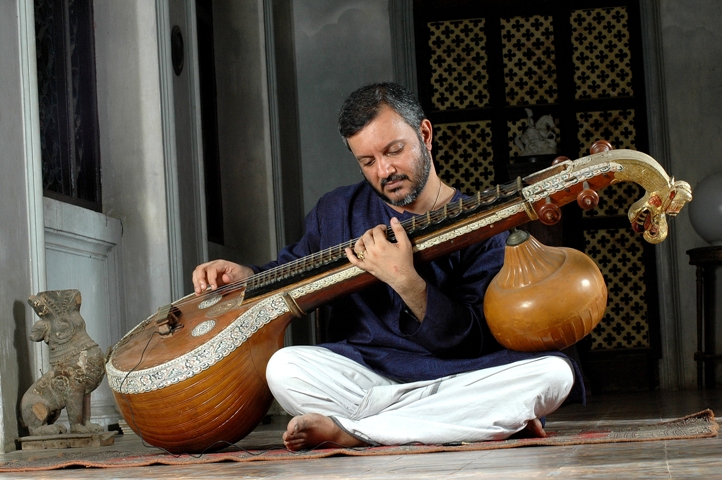
- Prince Rama Varma playing the Veena

Background information
- Born: Sree Padmanabhadasa Aswathi Thirunal Rama Varma; August 13, 1968 (age 58); Thiruvananthapuram, Kerala, India
- Genre: Carnatic classical music
- Occupations: Singer, veena player, writer.
- Years active: 1990 – present
- Website: ramavarma

Aswathi Thirunal Rama Varma , also known as Prince Rama Varma, is an Indian classical musician and a member of the erstwhile Royal Family of Travancore. He is a Carnatic vocalist as well as an exponent of the Saraswati Veena. He is also a teacher, musicologist, writer and orator.

== Early life ==
Rama Varma was born on 13 August 1968 and is a member of the Royal Family of Travancore. He is a direct descendant of Maharaja Swathi Thirunal.

He started formal vocal music lessons in 1982 under Prof. Vechoor Harihara Subramania Iyer, a senior disciple of Dr. Semmangudi Srinivasa Iyer, who continued to be his Guru until his demise in 1994. He also trained in the Veena under Trivandrum Sri R. Venkataraman and Prof. K.S. Narayanaswamy. Later, Varma went on to become a senior disciple of Dr. Mangalampalli Balamuralikrishna.

== Career ==
Prince Rama Varma gave his first public performance in 1990 and released his first CD at the Queen Elizabeth Hall in London. Later, he taught Indian music at the Rotterdam Conservatory, Codarts . Since returning to India, Varma has given several concerts and conducted music workshops in India and abroad. His concerts feature not only the best-known Carnatic compositions but also works from works from lesser-known composers such as Prayaga Rangadasa, Mallekonda Ramadasa, M.D. Ramanathan and Kaiwara Amara Nareyana. Videos on the YouTube channel Musiquebox, which features Varma's music, have received over 25 million views.

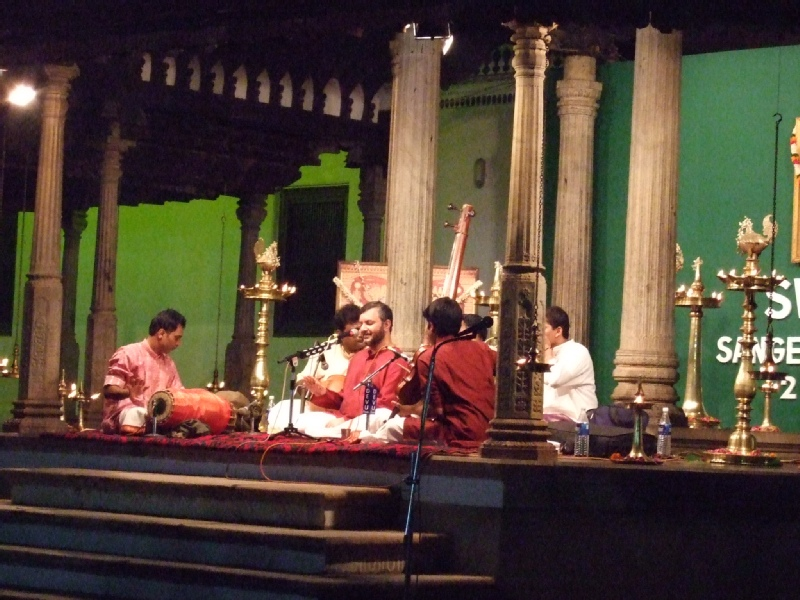
Rama Varma performing at Swathi Sangeethotsavam
