= List of Carnatic singers =

Carnatic music is the classical music of South India. The following lists provide links to concert artists who have been widely recognised.

== Vocalists - born before 1800 ==
- Oothukkadu Venkata Kavi, born 1700
- Dharma Raja Karthika Thirunal Rama Varma, born 1724
- Syama Shastri, born 1762
- Tyagaraja, born 1767
- Muthuswami Dikshitar, born 1775
- Irayimman Thampi, born 1782
- Shadkala Govinda Marar, born 1798, Endaro Mahanubhavulu was sung by Tyagaraja after he heard Marar sing.

== Vocalists - born between 1801 and 1900 ==
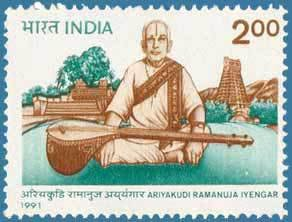
Ariyakudi Ramanuja Iyengar

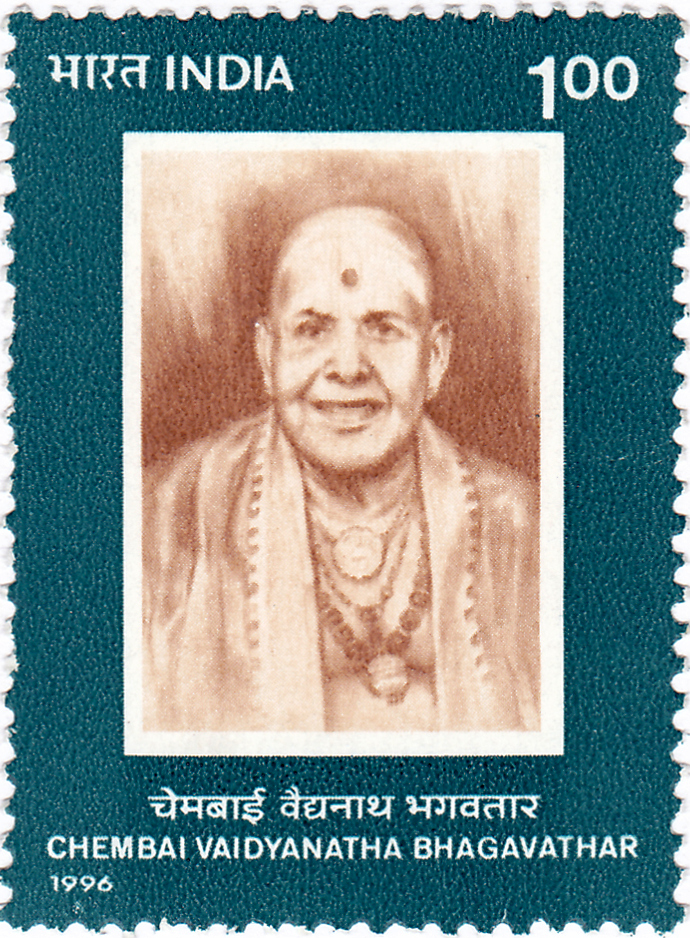
Chembai Vaidyanatha Bhagavathar

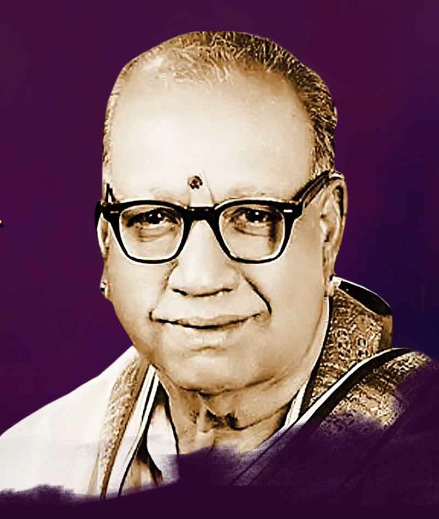
Maharajapuram Viswanatha Iyer
- Manambuchavadi Venkatasubbayyar, born 1803
- Subbaraya Sastri, born 1803 - rare honour to learn from the Trinity of Carnatic Music.
- Swati Tirunal, born 1813
- Palghat Parameswara Bhagavathar, born 1815
- Maha Vaidyanatha Sivan, born 1844
- Patnam Subramania Iyer, born 1845
- Poochi Srinivasa Iyengar, born 1860
- Mysore Vasudevachar, born 1865
- Tiger Varadachariar, born 1876
- Parupalli Ramakrishnayya Pantulu, born 1883
- Madurai Pushpavanam
- Ariyakudi Ramanuja Iyengar, born 1890
- Chembai Vaidyanatha Bhagavathar, born 1896
- Maharajapuram Viswanatha Iyer, born 1896
- Chittoor Subramaniam Pillai, born 1898
- Musiri Subramania Iyer, born 1899

== Vocalists - born between 1901 and 1925 ==
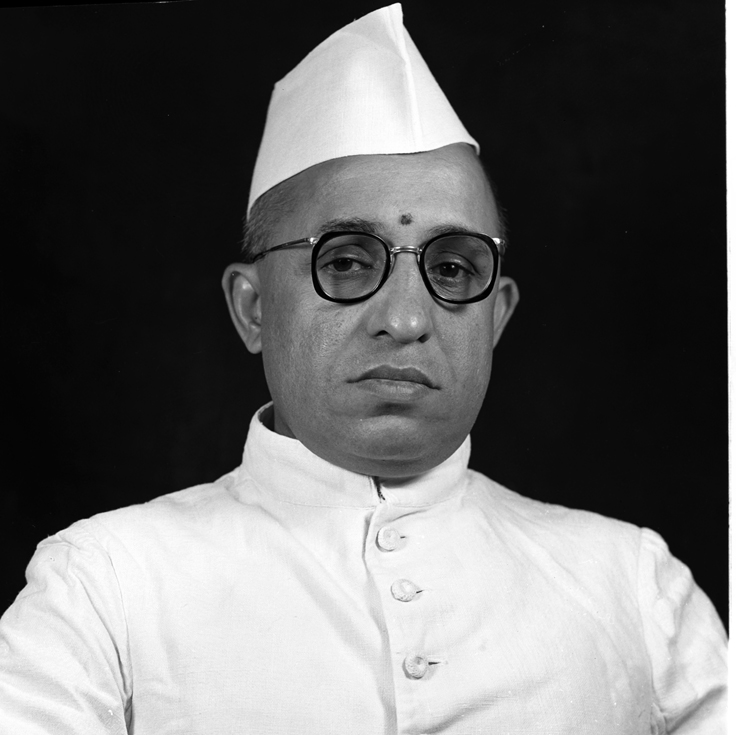
Semmangudi Srinivasa Iyer

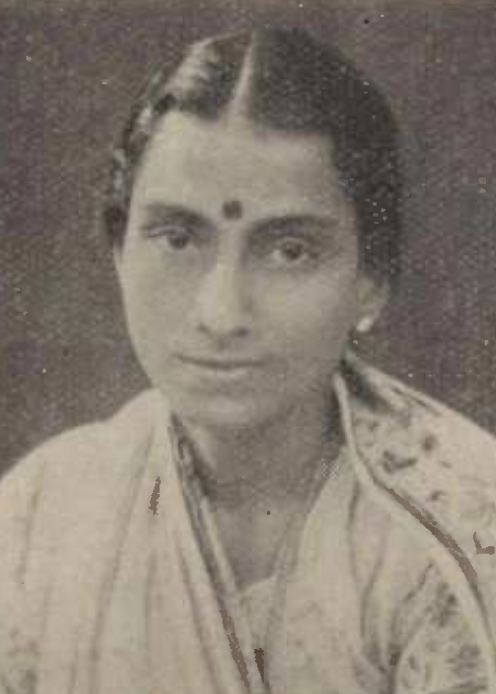
Lalita Venkatram

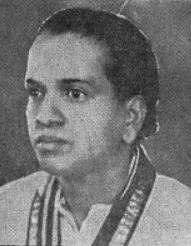
Madurai Mani Iyer

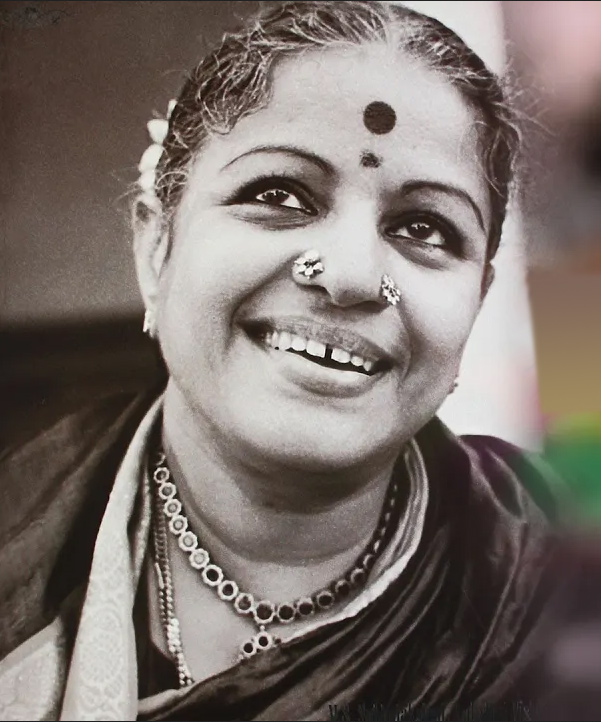
M. S. Subbulakshmi

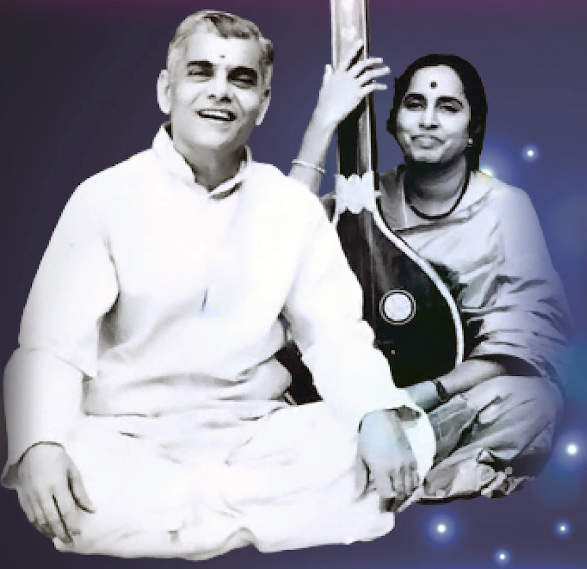
K. V. Narayanaswamy
- Semmangudi Srinivasa Iyer, born 1908
- K. B. Sundarambal, born 1908
- Lalita Venkatram, born 1909
- G. N. Balasubramaniam, born 1910
- Alathur Brothers: Srinivasa Iyer (born 1911) & Sivasubramania Iyer (born 1916)
- Madurai Mani Iyer, born 1912
- Mannargudi Sambasiva Bhagavatar, born 1912
- T. Brinda, born 1912
- T. Muktha, born 1914
- M. S. Subbulakshmi, born 1916
- Sattur A. G. Subramaniam, born 1916
- S. Ramanathan, born 1917
- Vasundhara Devi, born 1917
- Sandhyavandanam Srinivasa Rao, born 1918
- Ramnad Krishnan, born 1918
- Rajam Pushpavanam, born 1918
- D. K. Pattammal, born 1919
- Madurai Somasundaram, born 1919
- Jayachamarajendra Wadiyar, born 1919
- N. C. Vasanthakokilam, born 1919
- R. K. Srikantan, born 1920
- B. Rajam Iyer, born 1922
- Manakkal Rangarajan, born 1922
- K. V. Narayanaswamy, born 1923
- M. D. Ramanathan, born 1923

== Vocalists - born between 1926 and 1950 ==
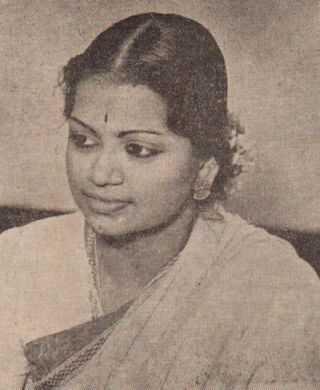
M. L. Vasanthakumari

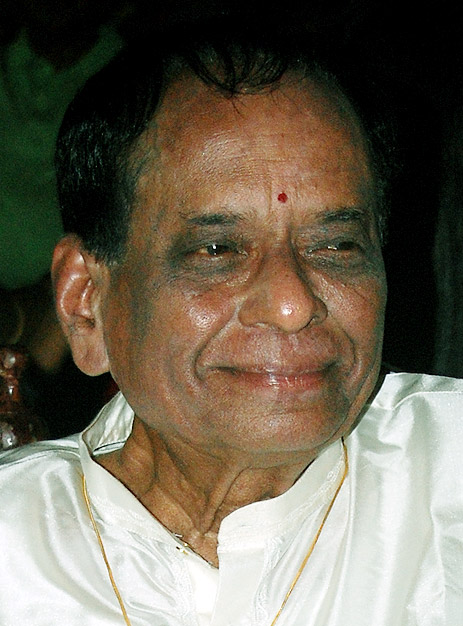
Dr. M. Balamuralikrishna

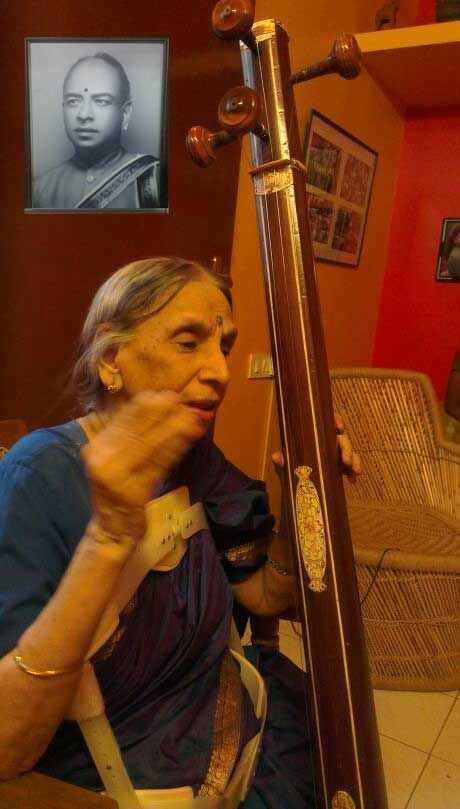
N. Lalitha Bhanu

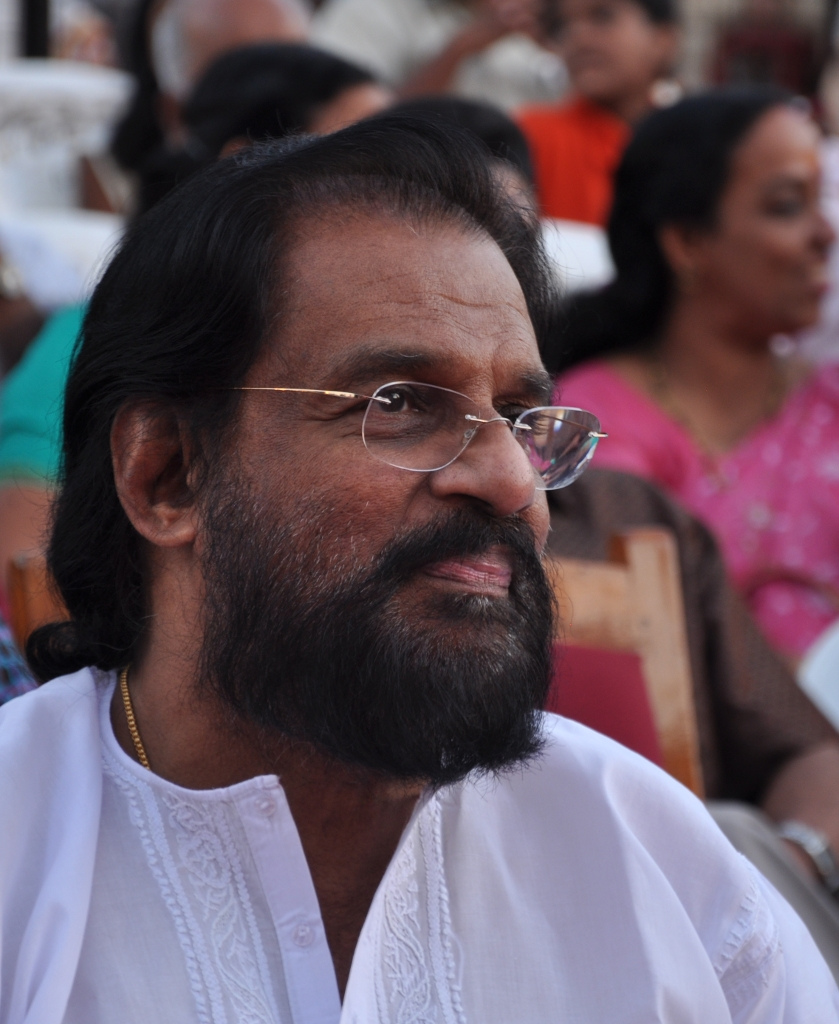
K. J. Yesudas

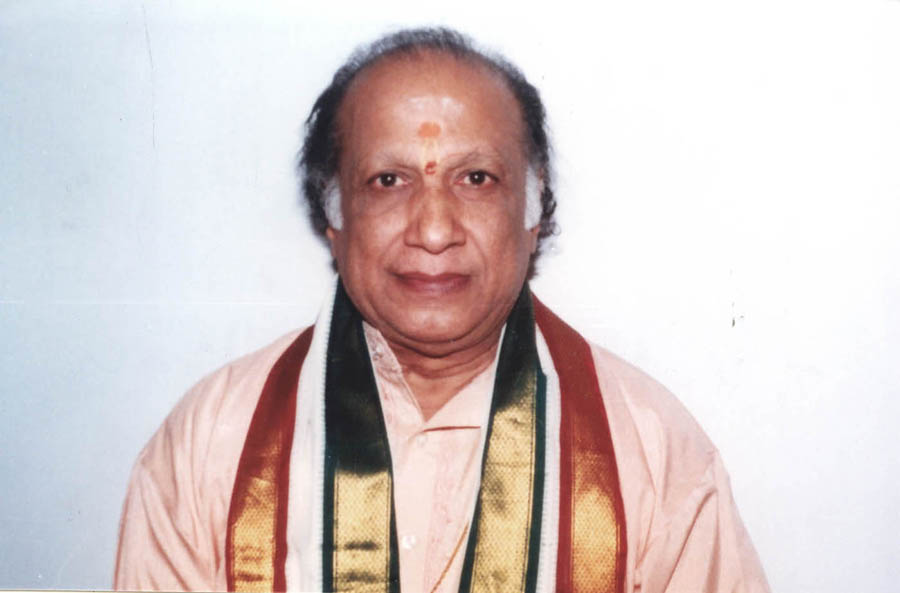
Trichur V. Ramachandran

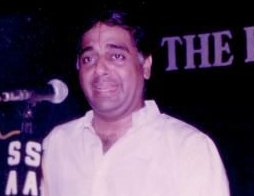
T. N. Seshagopalan
- L.P.R. Varma, born 1926
- Nedunuri Krishnamoorthy, born 1927
- M. L. Vasanthakumari, born 1928
- Maharajapuram Santhanam, born 1928
- Vairamangalam LakshmiNarayanan, born 1928
- D. K. Jayaraman, born 1928
- T. K. Govinda Rao, born 1929
- Dr. M. Balamuralikrishna, born 1930
- S. Kalyanaraman, born 1930
- N. Lalitha Bhanu, born 1931
- T. V. Gopalakrishnan, born 1932
- Radha Jayalakshmi Sisters, born 1932
- Seerkazhi Govindarajan, born 1933
- K. G. Jayan, born 1934
- P. S. Narayanaswamy, born 1934
- P Leela, born 1934
- R. Vedavalli, born 1935
- Bombay Sisters - C.Saroja (1936) and C.Lalitha (1938)
- Jon B. Higgins, born 1939
- Neyyattinkara M. K. Mohanachandran, Born 1939
- Pattu Rajagopalan
- K. J. Yesudas, born 1940
- M. G. Radhakrishnan, born 1940
- Trichur V. Ramachandran, born 1940
- K. Omanakutty, born 1943
- T. V. Sankaranarayanan, born 1945
- O. S. Thyagarajan, born 1947
- Madurai T. N. Seshagopalan, born 1948
- Garimella Balakrishna Prasad, born 1948
- Hyderabad Brothers - D. Seshachari and D. Raghavachari

== Vocalists born between 1951 and 1975 ==
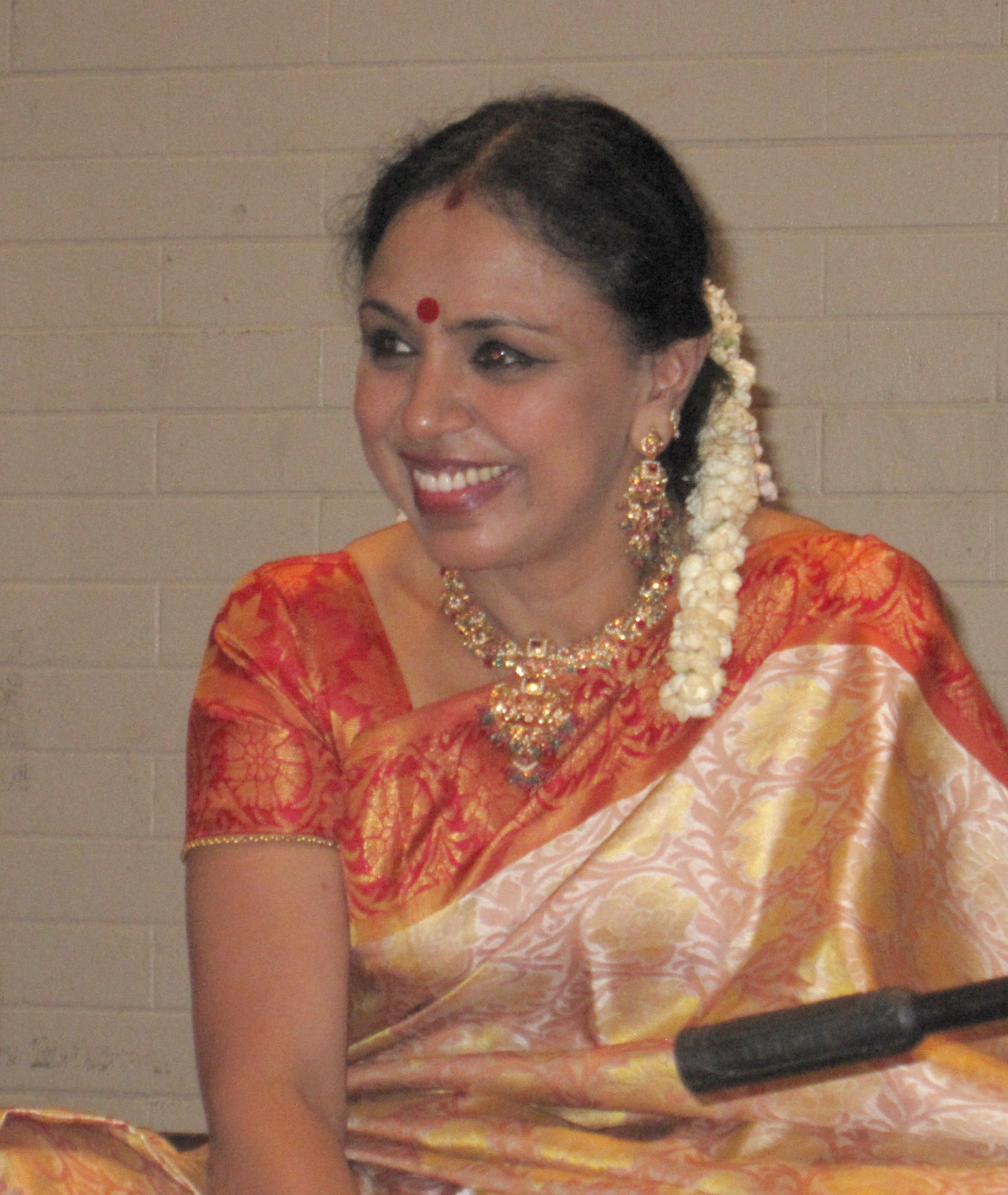
Sudha Ragunathan

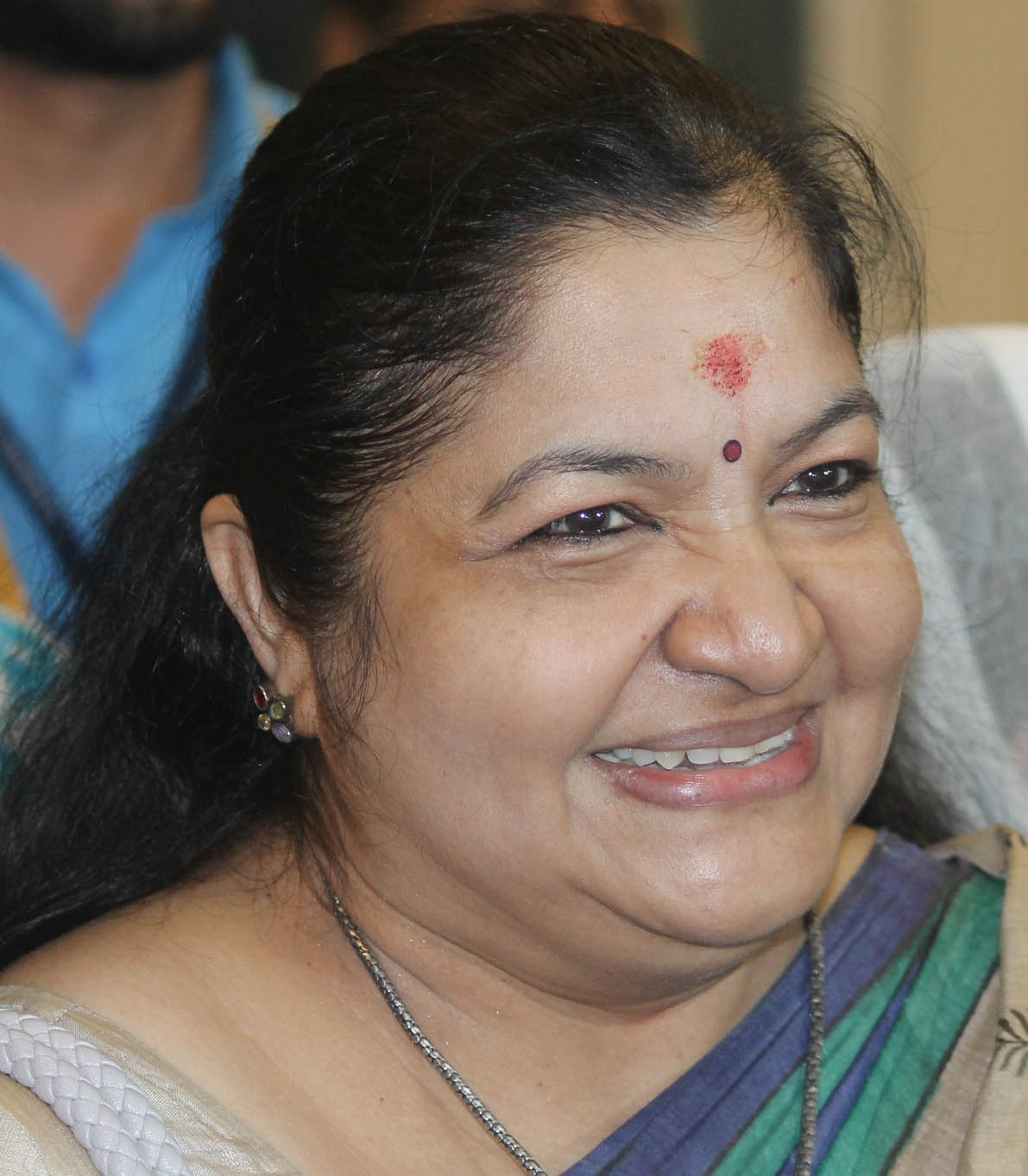
K. S. Chithra

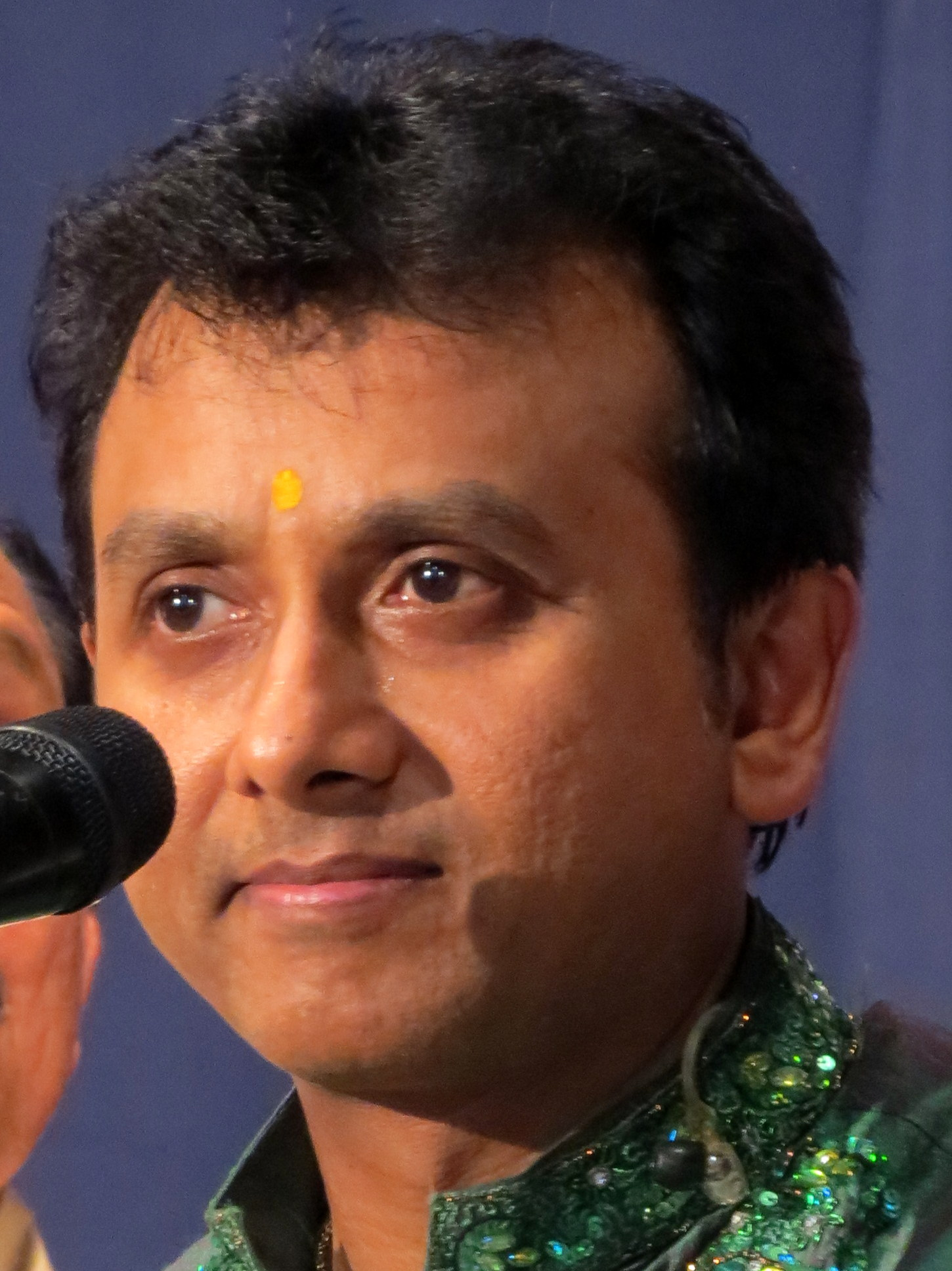
P. Unnikrishnan

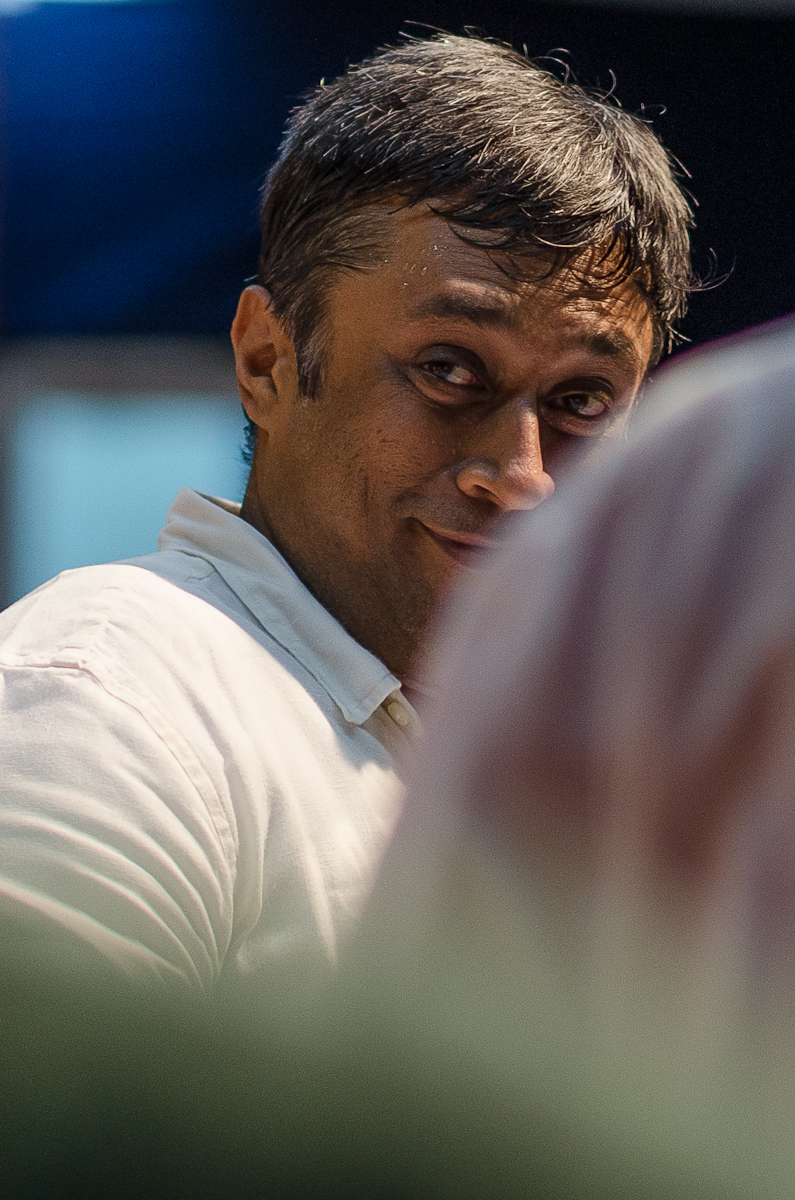
Sanjay Subrahmanyan

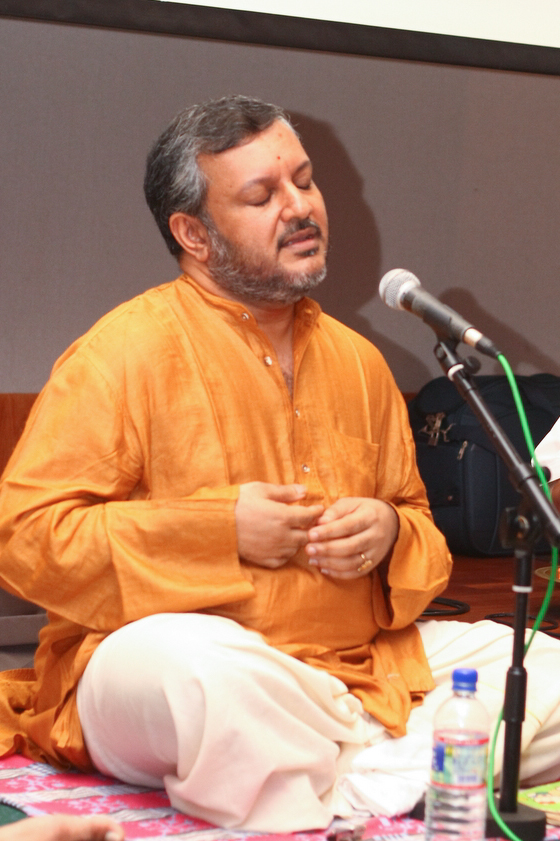
Aswathi Thirunal Rama Varma

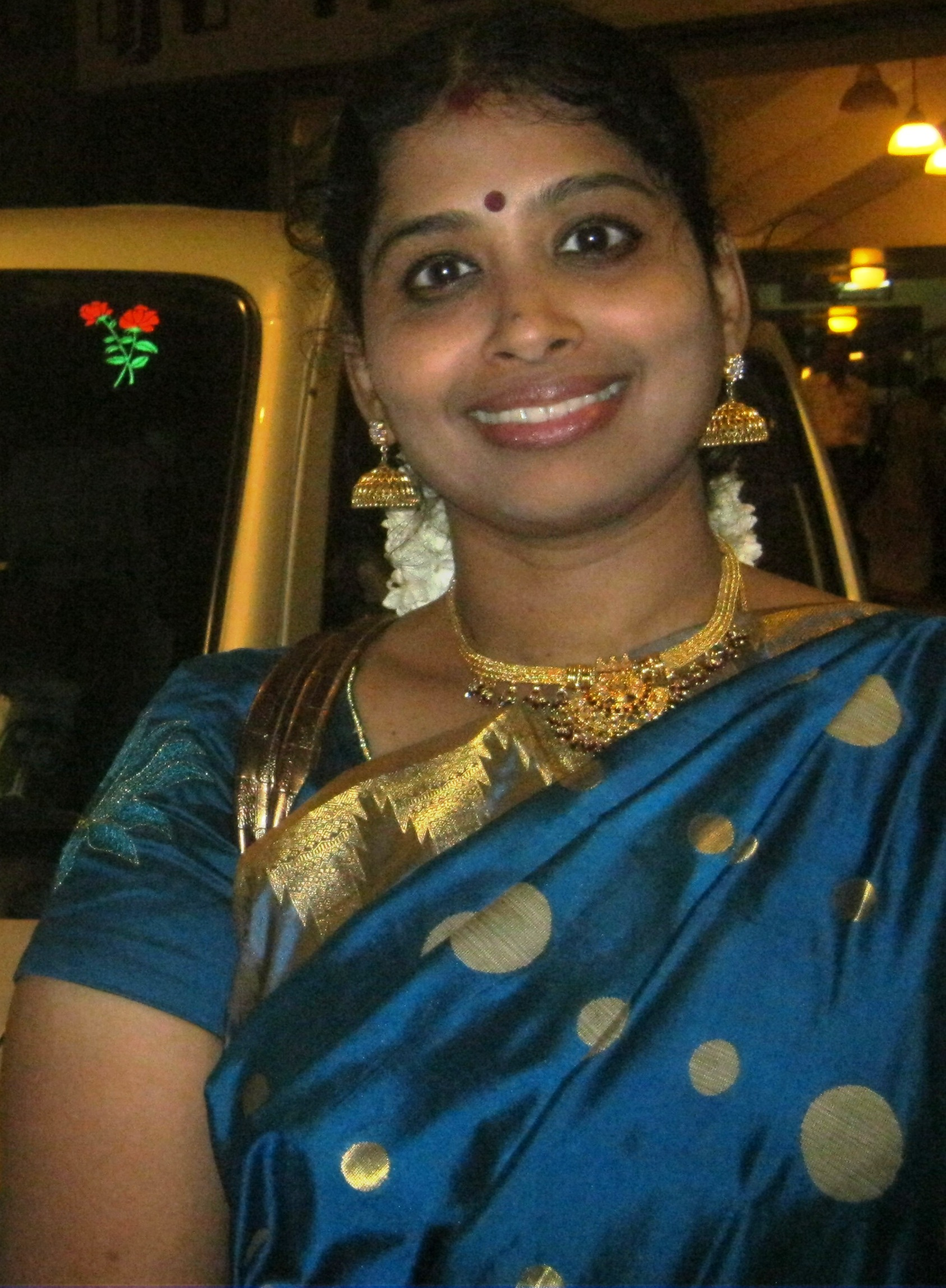
Nithyasree Mahadevan

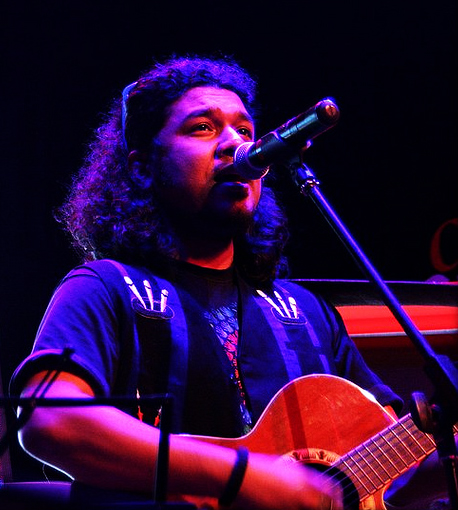
Papon (singer)
- Charumathi Ramachandran, born 1951
- Aruna Sairam, born 1952
- Sudha Ragunathan, born 1956
- M. G. Sreekumar, born 1957
- Bellary M Raghavendra, born 1958
- Bombay Lakshmi Rajagopalan, born 1959
- Sirkazhi G. Sivachidambaram, born 1959
- K. S. Chithra, born 1963
- O. S. Arun, born 1964
- Neyveli Santhanagopalan, born 1963
- P. Unnikrishnan, born 1966
- Shankar Mahadevan, born 1967
- Vijay Siva, born 1967
- Sanjay Subrahmanyan, born 1968
- Aswathi Thirunal Rama Varma, born 1968
- S. Sowmya, born 1969
- Sharreth, born 1969
- M. K. Sankaran Namboothiri, born 1971
- Malladi Brothers - Sreeram Prasad (1971) and Ravi Kumar (1973)
- Gayathri Girish, born 1973
- Nithyashree Mahadevan, born 1973

== Vocalists born between 1976 and 2000 ==
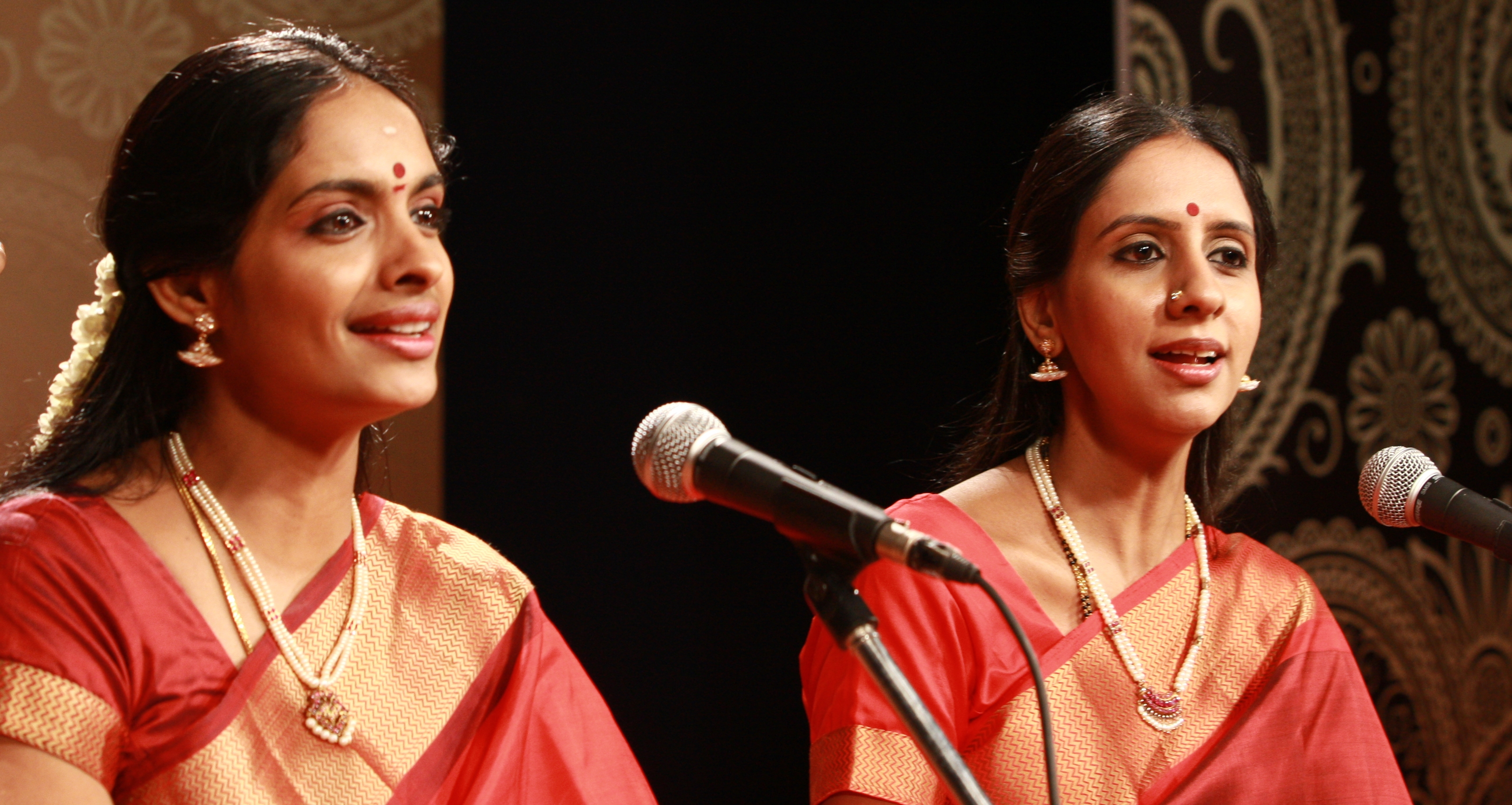
Ranjani-Gayatri

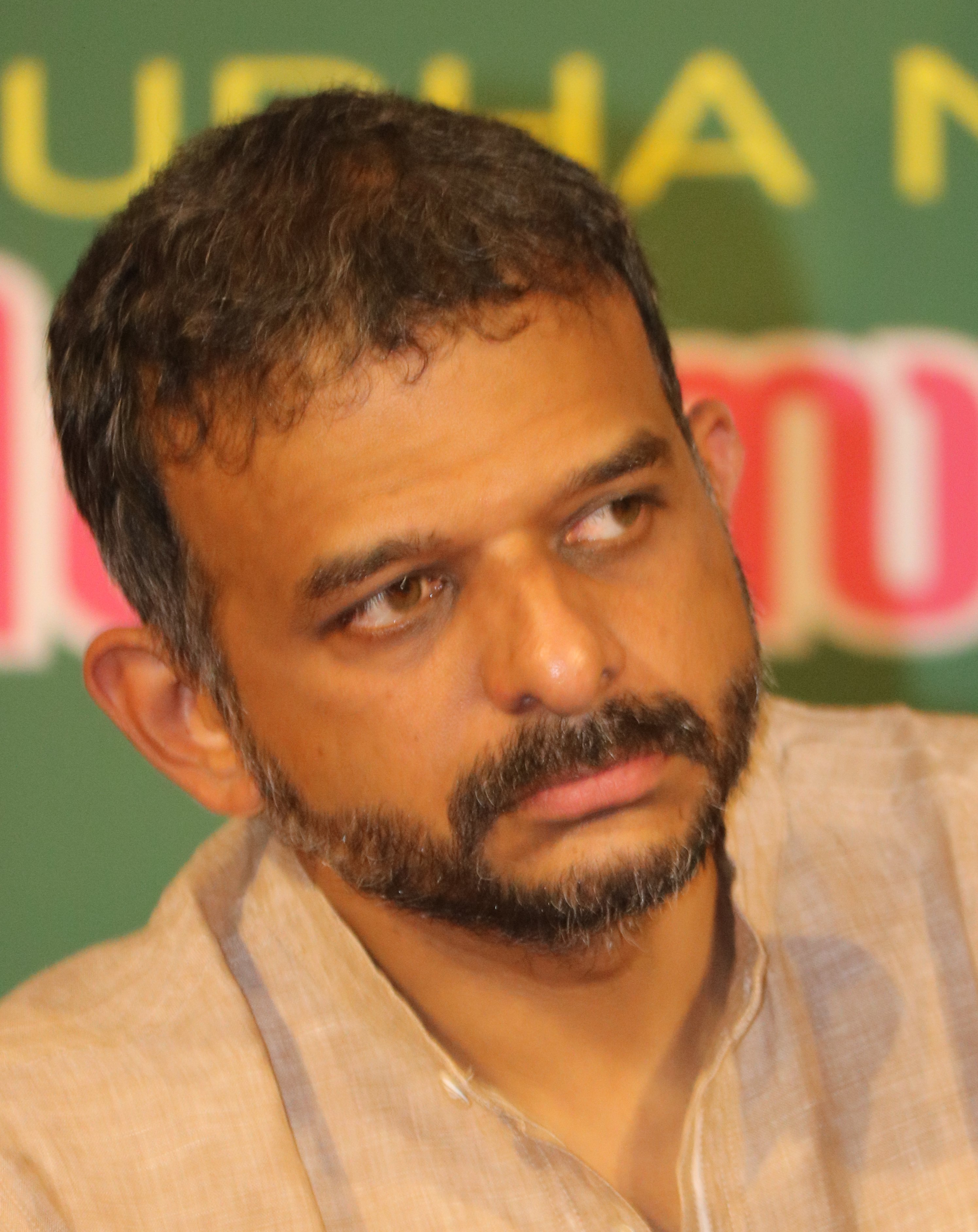
T. M. Krishna

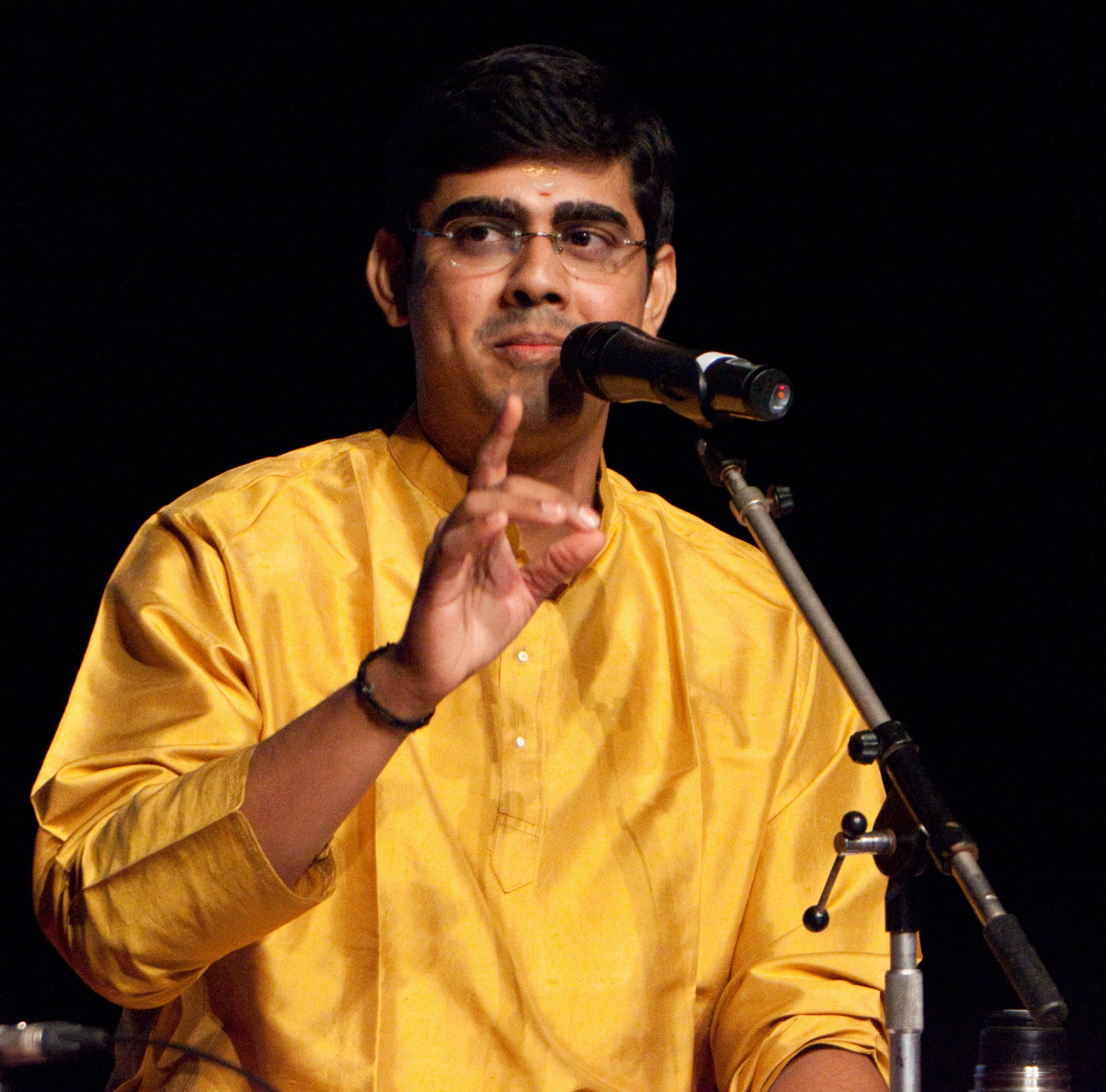
Sikkil Gurucharan

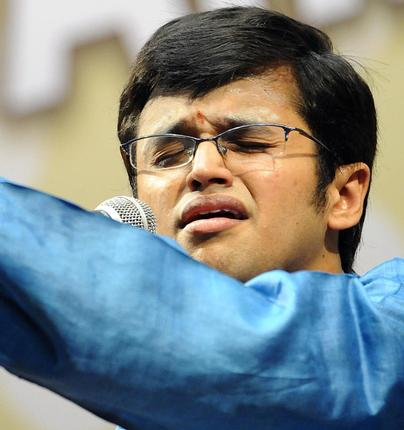
Saketharaman

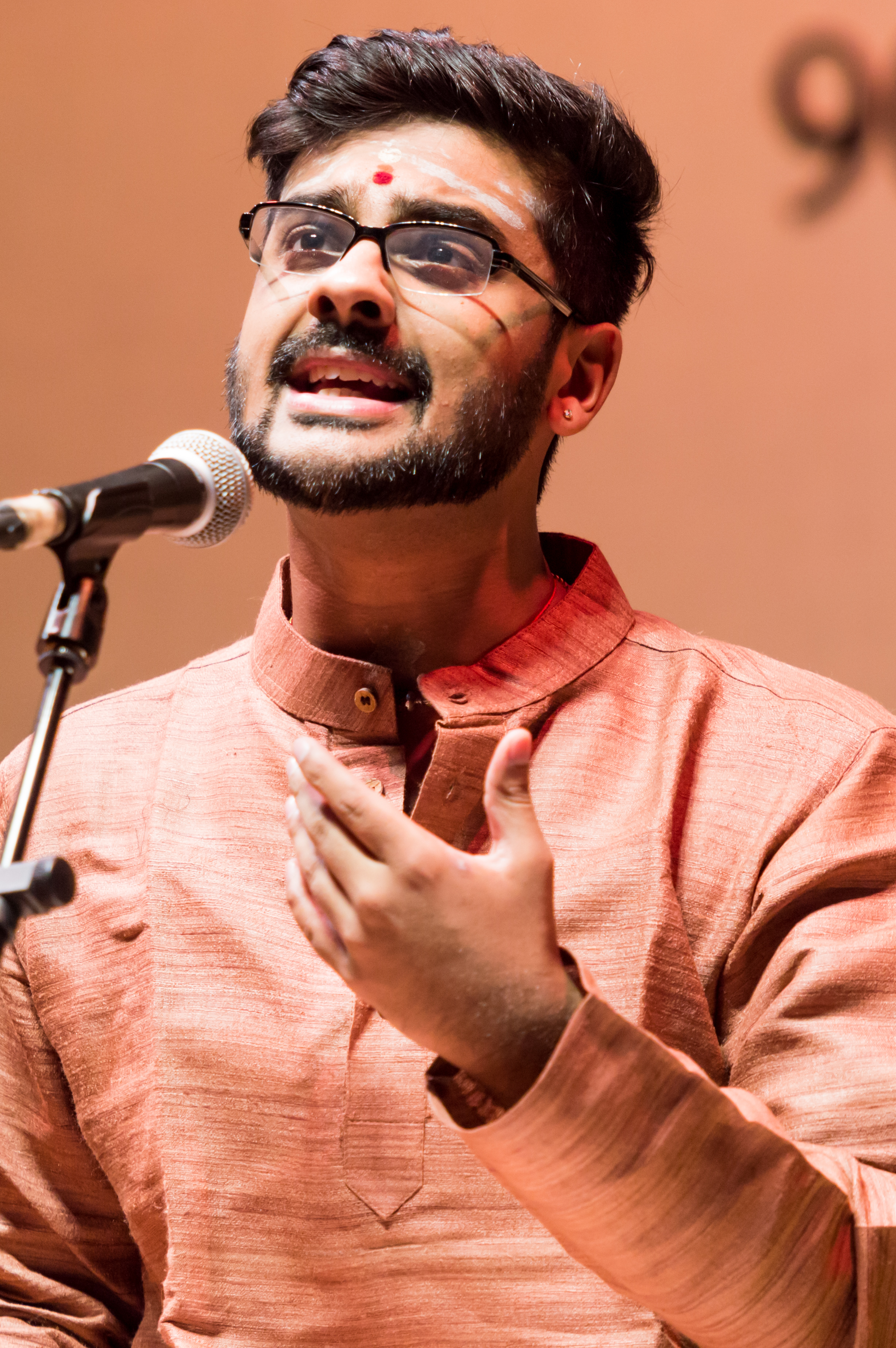
Ramakrishnan Murthy

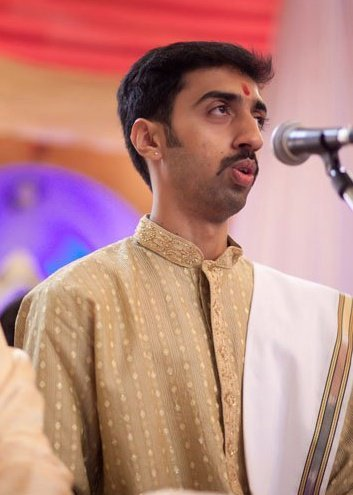
K. V. Krishna Prasad
- Ranjani–Gayatri - Ranjani (born 1973) and Gayatri (born 1976)
- T. M. Krishna, born 1976
- Vishaka Hari, born 1978
- Nisha Rajagopalan, born 1980
- Karthik (singer), born 1980
- Trichur Brothers - Srikrishna (born 1980) and Raamkumar (born 1983)
- Sriram Parthasarathy, born 1981
- Ranjani Hebbar, born 1981
- Sikkil Gurucharan, born 1982
- Saketharaman, born 1982
- Akkarai Sisters - Akkarai Subhalakshmi (born 1983) and Akkarai Sornalatha (born 1986)
- Ramakrishnan Murthy, born 1989
- Abhishek Raghuram, born 1985
- Aishwarya Vidhya Raghunath
- Sid Sriram, born 1990
- K. V. Krishna Prasad, born 1988
- Sivani Saraswatula, born in 1990
- S. Aishwarya, born in 1995

== Vocalists - born after 2000 ==
- Delhi Sisters - Madhavi Sitaraman (born 2001) and Vaishnavi Sitaraman (born 2004)
- Rahul Vellal, born 2007

== Other vocalists ==
- Chong Chiu Sen
- Gayathri Venkataraghavan
- Ashwath Narayanan
- Bharat Sundar
- Sriranjani Santhanagopalan
- Geetha Rajashekar
- S. J. Jananiy
- Bombay Jayashri
- Mahathi
- Vedavathi Prabhakar
- Priya Sisters - Vemuri Shanmukha Priya and Hari Priya
- Chinmaya Sisters - Uma and Radhika
- Pantula Rama
- Ramakrishnan Murthy
- Sampagodu Vighnaraja
- Sreevalsan J Menon
- M. S. Sheela
- R. Suryaprakash
- Vani Sateesh
- Vidya Subramanian
- Vijayalakshmy Subramaniam
- Visalakshi Nityanand
