= Rajagopalan =

Rajagopalan is the name of:

== Given name ==
- Rajagopalan Krishnan (1932–2015), Indian doctor
- Rajagopalan Parthasarathy (born 1945), Indian mathematician
- Rajagopalan Radhakrishnan (born 1949), American literature professor and literary critic
- Rajagopalan Vasudevan (21st century), Indian waste management scientist

== Surname ==
- Ashok Rajagopalan (active since 1989), Indian writer
- Bombay Lakshmi Rajagopalan (born 1959), Indian musician
- C. R. Rajagopalan (ca. 1957 – 2022), Indian writer and folklore researcher
- K. P. Rajagopalan (1902–1944), Indian writer
- Krishnamurthy Rajagopalan (born 1967), Indian cricketer
- Lara Rajagopalan (born 2005), Tamil-American singer
- M. Rajagopalan (born 1960), Indian politician
- Nisha Rajagopalan (born 1980), Indian musician
- P. K. Rajagopalan (1930–2024), Indian scientist
- Pattu Rajagopalan (active 1949–2011), Indian musician
- Ranganayaki Rajagopalan (1932–2018), musician
- Rhea Rajagopalan (born 2000), Tamil-American singer
