= Thrissur (disambiguation) =

Thrissur or Trichur may refer to:

== City in Kerala, India ==
- Thrissur, formerly Trichur, also known by its historical name Thrissivaperur, a city in the Indian state of Kerala
  - Thrissur Development Authority
  - Thrissur district
  - Thrissur Lok Sabha constituency

== People with the name Trichur ==
- Trichur Brothers, Carnatic classical musicians Srikrishna Mohan and Ramkumar Mohan
- Trichur C. Narendran, Indian musician
- Trichur V. Ramachandran, Indian musician, a noted Carnatic violinist from Kerala
