= Aishwarya Vidhya Raghunath =

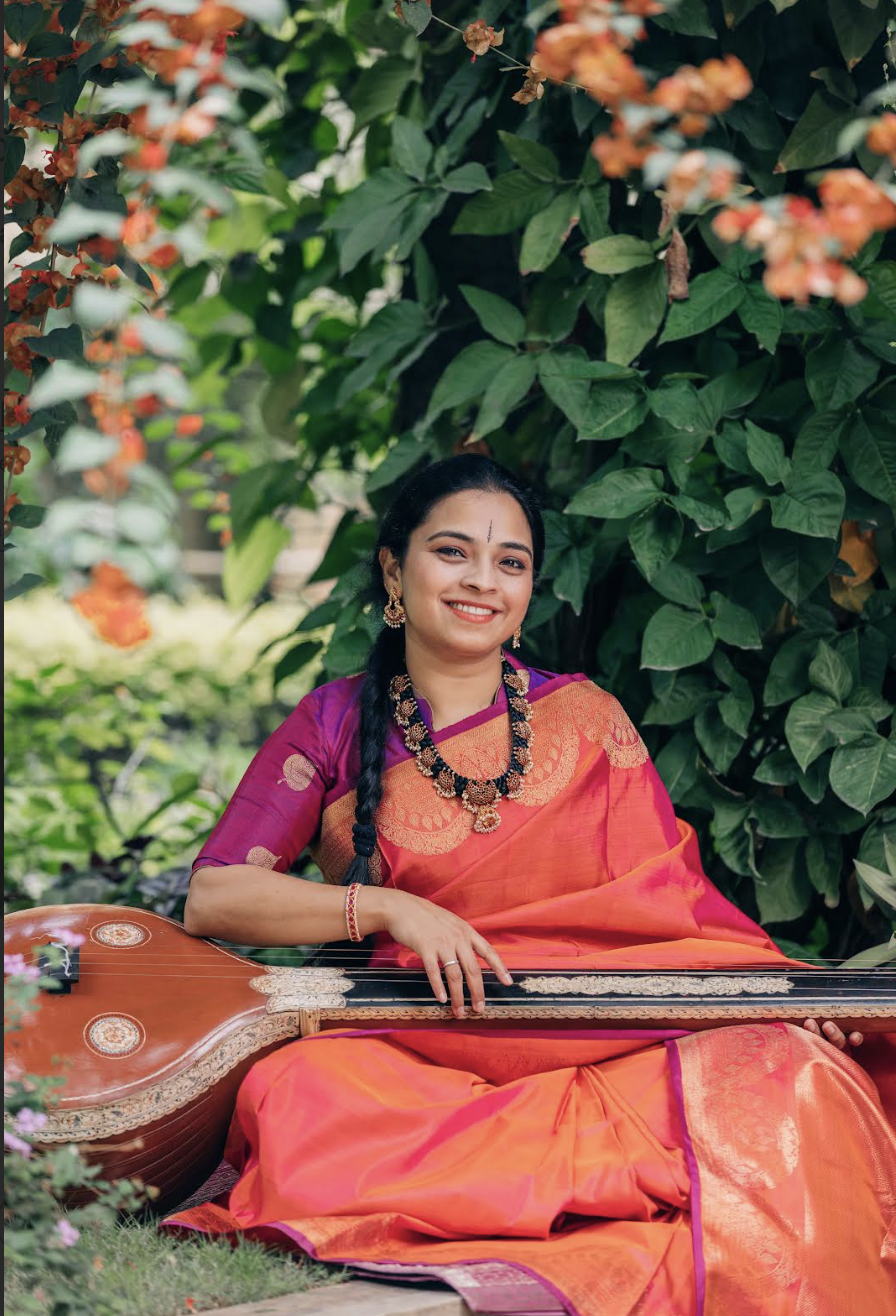

Background information
- Born: Bengaluru, Karnataka, India
- Genres: Carnatic music
- Occupation: Vocalist
- Years active: 2005–present
- Website: www.aishwaryavidhyaraghunath.org

Aishwarya Vidhya Raghunath (also known as AVR) is an Indian Carnatic vocalist from Bengaluru, Karnataka. She is an A‑grade artiste with All India Radio and Doordarshan.

== Early life and training ==
Raghunath began her training in Carnatic music at the age of three. She received foundational instruction from Smt Seethalakshmi Venkatesan and later advanced her studies under Padma Bhushan Shri P. S. Narayanaswamy, Sangeetha Kala Sagaram Smt Vegavahini Vijayaraghavan, and Vidwan Shri R. K. Shriramkumar, deeply rooted in the Semmangudi and Veena Dhanammal banis.

She gave her first solo public performance at age thirteen.

== Career ==
Raghunath has performed at major venues including the Madras Music Academy, Shanmukhananda Hall (Mumbai), Bangalore Gayana Samaj, Rabindra Mandap (Bhubaneswar), IISc Bengaluru, IIT Madras, and University of Miami.

In 2018, she undertook a two‑month concert tour across the United States and Canada under the aegis of the Carnatic Music Association of North America (CMANA).

Her performances have been critically acclaimed, with The Hindu praising her handling of Mahābhāp and manodharma in ragas like Begada and Poorvikalyani.

Raghunath's performances have been featured in national media such as The Hindu, where critics highlighted her "classicism and spontaneity", and in interviews and profiles in The Hindu and KnowYourStar.

== Awards and recognition ==
She has received multiple awards, including:

- “Outstanding Lady Vocalist Award” from the Music Academy, Chennai (three consecutive years)
- Kalki Krishnamurthy Award
- M. S. Subbulakshmi Award (Narada Gana Sabha)
- Yuva Purandara Award
- D. K. Pattammal Award
- Raga Laya Prabha Award
- Government of India Scholarship for Young Artistes (Ministry of Culture, 2008–2010)

Additional honors include prizes from Narada Gana Sabha, Ramana Kendra, RMKV, Bangalore Gayana Samaj, Kerala Music Sabhas, and recognition by the Indo‑Canadian Shastri Foundation.

== See also ==
- Carnatic music
- List of Carnatic singers
