= Sampagodu Vighnaraja =

- Born: Sampagodu S. Vighnaraja; Sringeri, India
- Occupations: singer; music composer; flutist; slide guitarist; teacher
- Years active: 1995–present
- Spouse: Madhuvanthi Vighnaraja (Nov 2015)
- Musical career
- Genres: indian classical; carnatic
- Instruments: vocals; flute; slide guitar
- Website: vighnaraja.in

Sampagodu S. Vighnaraja is an Indian Carnatic music, vocalist, flutist and music composer, a popular proponent of the GNB School. He is also a carnatic flutist and carnatic slide guitarist.

== Early life and training ==
Born to Smt. Nagalakshmi & Sangeetha Vidwan Sri. D.S. Suryanarayana Bhat, at age 3 Vighnaraja was able to sing Kalpanaswaram (improvisational swaras) for raag Mayamalava Gowla.

Vighnaraja started his early tutelage when he was 5 years old under his father Sangeetha Vaaridhi Sri.D.S. Suryanarayan Bhat, who is a direct disciple of G.N.B. School. His father is a composer of many Krithis in Kannada and Sanskrit. Two years later, he learnt from Vidhwan D.N.Subramanya Bhat, one of his father's disciples. Vighnaraja is also a self taught flutist and slide guitarist.

He headed the instrument section at Temple of Fine Arts in Kuala Lumpur for 6 years, conducted various workshops for students in Malaysia & Tainan University of Technology, Taiwan. He is the founder director of Surya Global Music Academy at Bangalore and has composed various Varanas, Tillanas among many other compositions.

Vighnaraja has specialized in singing complex varnams in six speeds. This has earned him the title of "Shatkaala Kalaa Gaana Prathibhamani" from a reputed organization in Bangalore. He is a graded artist of AIR and is recognized by the Indian Cultural Centre, High Commission of India Kuala Lumpur, Malaysia.

== Performance ==
Vighnaraja has given hundreds of performances in India and abroad like USA, Singapore, New Zealand, Australia, Malaysia and Taiwan including regular concerts at Fort High School Ramanavami festivals, Bangalore Gayana Samaja, and sabhas in Chennai. He has been accompanied by the artists including Sri Mannargudi Eshwaran, sri S Varadarajan, Patri Satish Kumar, Dr Jyothsna Srikanth, Sri K V Prasad, Kum, Akkarai Subbulakshmi, Sri Trichy Harikumar , H.K. Venkatram, Sri Arjun Kumar, Sri Vittal Ramamurthy, Sri J Vaidyanathan, H.K. Narasimha Murthy, Sri Neyveli Venkatesh , Mysore Srikanth, Sri C Cheluvaraju, Sri H N Bhaskar, Sri A V Anand, Anoor Anantha Krishna Sharma, Sri Karaikudi Krishna Murthy, Smt Sukanya Ramgopal, and Sri Ghatam Karthik. His style of singing has been praised by critics and musicians including L. Subramaniam.

== Awards ==
- Vighnaraja was awarded the BOH Cameronian Arts Award in 2009 at Kuala Lumpur, Malaysia for Best Vocal Solo Performance.
- He was bestowed with "SHATKAALA KALAA GAANA PRATHIBHA MANI" by Shree Rama Centre of Performing Arts (R), Bangalore in 2012.
- Was awarded the famous "ARYABHATA INTERNATIONAL AWARD" in 2012.
- He has also received the title "GAANA GANDHARVA" by Malenadu Vidya Samsthe, Chikkamagaluru in February 2015
- "ANANYA YUVA PURASKARA" by Ananya, Bangalore in May 2015.
- Aasthaana Vidvaan of Sringeri Sharada Peeta, Sri Sringeri Mutt 2021, Chikkamagaluru.
