= Gayathri Venkataraghavan =

Indian singer

- காயத்ரி வெங்கட்ராகவன்
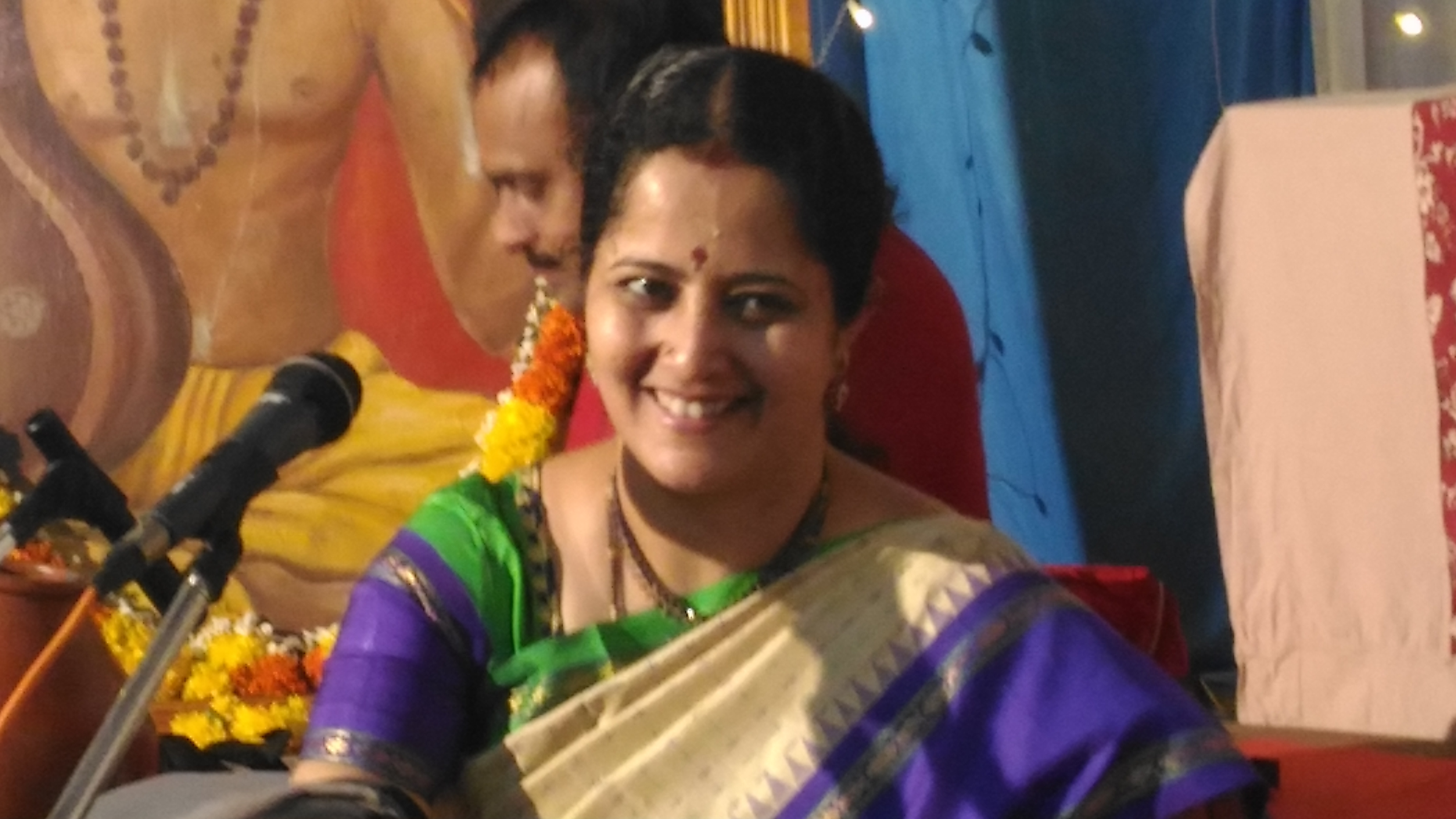
- Occupation: Carnatic vocalist

Gayathri Venkataraghavan (Tamil: காயத்ரி வெங்கட்ராகவன்) is an Indian Carnatic vocalist. She lives in Chennai.

== Education ==
Venkataraghavan trained in Carnatic music at an early age under Rajalakshmi, Padma Veeraraghavan, Rukmini Ramani, V. Subramaniam and Lakshmi Natarajan. At a young age, as Gayatri Ramani, she won a number of prizes in inter-school and Inter-collegiate competitions as well as at competitions held by Music Academy and other sabhas including Indian Fine Arts Society, Mayilapore Fine Arts and Saraswati Vaggeyakara Trust. Her advanced training started in 1990 under Acharya Choodamani Sri. A. Sundareshan, a disciple of Sri C. V. Krishnamurty Iyer, Sri Ramnad Krishnan, and Alathur Shri Shivasubramanya Iyer. She moved to Madurai / Tirunelveli after marriage. Although it witnessed a hiatus in her career, she successfully bounced back into the performing scene after eight years and continued her training under A. Sundareshan. Gayathri later trained with P. S. Narayanaswamy (PSN), a disciple of Semmangudi Srinivasa Iyer, until PSN's death in October 2020.

== Performances ==
The Hindu wrote that her singing shows "modesty and sincerity", and praised her for choosing rare kritis in a 2016 concert. In a 2015 concert, The Hindu wrote that she "comprehends the strong link between the devoutness of classical music and its manifestation in the form of kritis." They have also called her voice "melodious."

== Discography ==
Her commercial albums have been released by Charsur Digital Workstation and other companies.

== Awards and titles ==
- D. K. Pattammal Award for Lady Vocalist (2001)
- T. T. Rangaswamy Award (2002)
- Kalki Krishnamoorty Award (2003)
- Nada Oli title by Nada Inbam, Madras (2003)
- H. Natarajan Prize (2003, 2004)
- Carnatic Music Association of North America award
- Pappu Kamakshi Award (2006)
- MLV Endowment Award by Narada Gana Sabha (2006)
- Isai Peroli title by Kartik Fine Arts (2008)
- Shanmukha Sangeeta Shironmani from Shanmukhananda Sabha (2008)
