= K. V. Krishna Prasad =

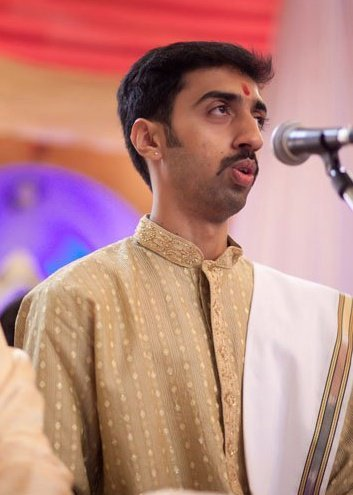

Background information
- Also known as: KP
- Born: 29 January 1988 (age 38)
- Genres: Indian classical music
- Occupation: Carnatic Vocalist
- Years active: 2000–present
- Website: http://kvkrishnaprasad.com/

K. V. Krishna Prasad, also known as KP, is a Carnatic music vocalist.

== Early life ==
Prasad was born on 29 January 1988 to K. N. Venkatanarayana and K. V. Chandrakala who are native to Sringeri. He started learning Carnatic music at the age of 8 under the training of Vid. Geetha, Vid.Swarnalatha and Vid. M V Raghuram.

== Music career ==
Later on Krishna Prasad started practicing under Vid. Ganakalabhushana R. K. Padmanabha. After one year of learning under Vid. R. K. Padmanabha, Krishna Prasad gave his maiden concert. He passed his Music Seniors Exam with university 3rd rank. He has performed in more than 500 stages including many sabhas like Shanmughananda Sangeetha Sabha Mumbai, Abhedananda Sangeetha Sabha Trivandrum, Tyagaraja Gana sabha, Malleshwara Sangeetha sabha, Karnataka Gana Kala Parishath, Indian Institute of World Culture, Rudrapatna Sangeethotsava, Sri Rama Seva Mandali (Fort High School) and many more and in many TV channels as well.

== Controversies ==
- K V Krishna Prasad along with his father K N Venkatnarayana is said to have cheated hundreds of depositors to the tune of hundreds of crores through his Cooperative Society, Sri Vasista Credit Sauharda Sahakari Limited. The scam is said to be of the scale of around Rs. 200 Crores.

== Other activities ==
- Vid. K V Krishna Prasad is the official music critic for the dailies "Deccan Herald" and "Prajavani", Bangalore, the youngest ever to come to that post.
- He has written a book "Na kanda GurugaLu" in Kannada published by Kannada Sahitya Parishat.
- Krishna Prasad is also
  - Secretary of an academic institution ‘Our School’
  - Secretary of ‘N.R. Colony Rama Mandira’
  - Secretary of ‘Sadhguru Seva Trust’
  - Proprietor of ‘Sri Vidya Associates’ – A construction Unit
  - Heads a music school ‘Sri Vidya Kala Kendra’ where he has been training more than 100 students.
  - Youth Wing convener of the prestigious ‘Karnataka Ganakala Parishat’

== Honours and awards ==
- B High Grade Artist at All India Radio.
- Krishna Prasad performs a unique presentation of Karnatic music along with his father Sri K.N. Venkatanarayana called ‘Gaana Jnana Sudha’ which brings to light various vaggeyakaras, their compositions and the satva behind these compositions.
- Has performed at prestigious sabhas across the country and abroad including Karnataka Ganakala Parishat, Bangalore Gayana Samaja, Nadabrahma Sangeeta Sabha, Trivandrum Abhedananda Ashram, Kaladi Shankar Mutt, Sri Rama Seva Mandali - Fort high school, Shanmugananda Sangeeta Sabha Mumbai, Krishna Gana Sabha Chennai, and many more across Bellary, Kolar, Hassan, Belur, Shimoga, Hubli, Tumkur etc. Additionally he has performed in radio channels (Radio One, Big FM, Akashvaani, Jnana Vaani) and Television programs for channels like ETV Kannada, Zee Kannada, Chandana, Shankara and Udaya.
- He has also performed abroad in the Singapore Fine Arts (SIFA), Los Angeles, San Jose, San Francisco, New York, and recently the prestigious AKKA Sammelana. He has also won accolades for conducting workshops on foundation of music, vaggeyakaras, sahityakaras, haridasas for the children at SIFA and various places across the U.S. • Has composed more than 100 compositions in Kannada and Sanskrit with ‘Venkata Dasa’ as his penname which includes krithis, Varnas and thillans including newly invented ragas like Padmanabhapriya, Ramakrishna, Vivekavani etc
- He has also presented various lectures on Ugabhogas, Thillanaas, Dasa Sahitya, Gamaka Sangeeta, psychology of ragas, vaggeyakaras and their lives etc. • Krishna Prasad is also widely recognized for his uncanny series of presentation on life of Sri Swami Vivekananda called ‘Viveka Namana’.
- Organized many workshops for his students as part of their training following the gurukula system of teaching.
- He has received ‘Best Performer Award’ from Kannada Koota – New Jersey and also ‘Music Excellence Award’ from Rotary International Club, Bengaluru – 2017. o ‘Sangeeta Visharada’ from Kolar Sangeeta Sabha o ‘Nadajyoti Puraskara’ from Nadajyoti Sangeeta Sabha o ‘Ananya Yuva Puraskara’ from Ananya Cultural Academy – to name a few.
- Krishna Prasad, claims his father Sri. K.N. Venkatanarayana and guru Sri R.K. Padmanabha to have inspired him the most with their principles and philosophy that has implanted in him today, carving a niche for himself gaining immense appreciation and praise for his knowledge and rendering of Karnatik vocal music.
