= Nalini Chandran =

Nalini Chandran is the founder of Hari Sri Vidya Nidhi School, in 1978.

== Early life ==
Nalini Chandran was born in Kannambra, Palakkad, Kerala. She studied at the Cathedral & John Connon Girls' School, and Elphinstone College, Mumbai. She is a qualified dancer, choreographer, dramatist, and a writer of stories for children. She married Lt. Col. Chandran, and has three daughters, Deepti Menon, Neema Varma and Bhavna Nair. She lives in Thrissur, Kerala.

== Career ==
While accompanying her husband as an army wife, Nalini worked in several schools and took active part in Army Welfare centres across India. Over several years, Nalini taught at different schools, handling subjects of English and history. In 1983, her husband took premature retirement from the Indian Army, and on his persuasion, she founded the Hari Sri Vidya Nidhi School, affiliated to the ICSE-ISC board. The next year, her husband died after a massive cardiac arrest.

Nalini served as the principal of the Hari Sri Vidya Nidhi School twice, from 1983 to 1995 and again from 1999 to 2000. Currently, Nalini continues in her capacity as the Director of Hari Sri Vidya Nidhi School, and oversees the school’s functioning. She is the honorary director of Sandeepani Vidya Nikethan, Thrissur, and the president of 'Thalam', a cultural trust in Kerala.

== Awards ==
Nalini is the recipient of The Rangojwala Award in 2005, the Guruvar Award for Excellence in Teaching in 2009, the Kerala Sangeetha Nataka Akademi Award 2013 for excellence in Choreography, the Charter of Honour (by the Indian Medical Association, Thrissur) and The Manorama-Air India BOLT Award. Nalini is the first Keralite to win the Derozio Award. The Council for Indian School Certificate Examinations has instituted the award for exemplary service to school education and human enrichment.
