= Bharat Sundar =

Indian singer

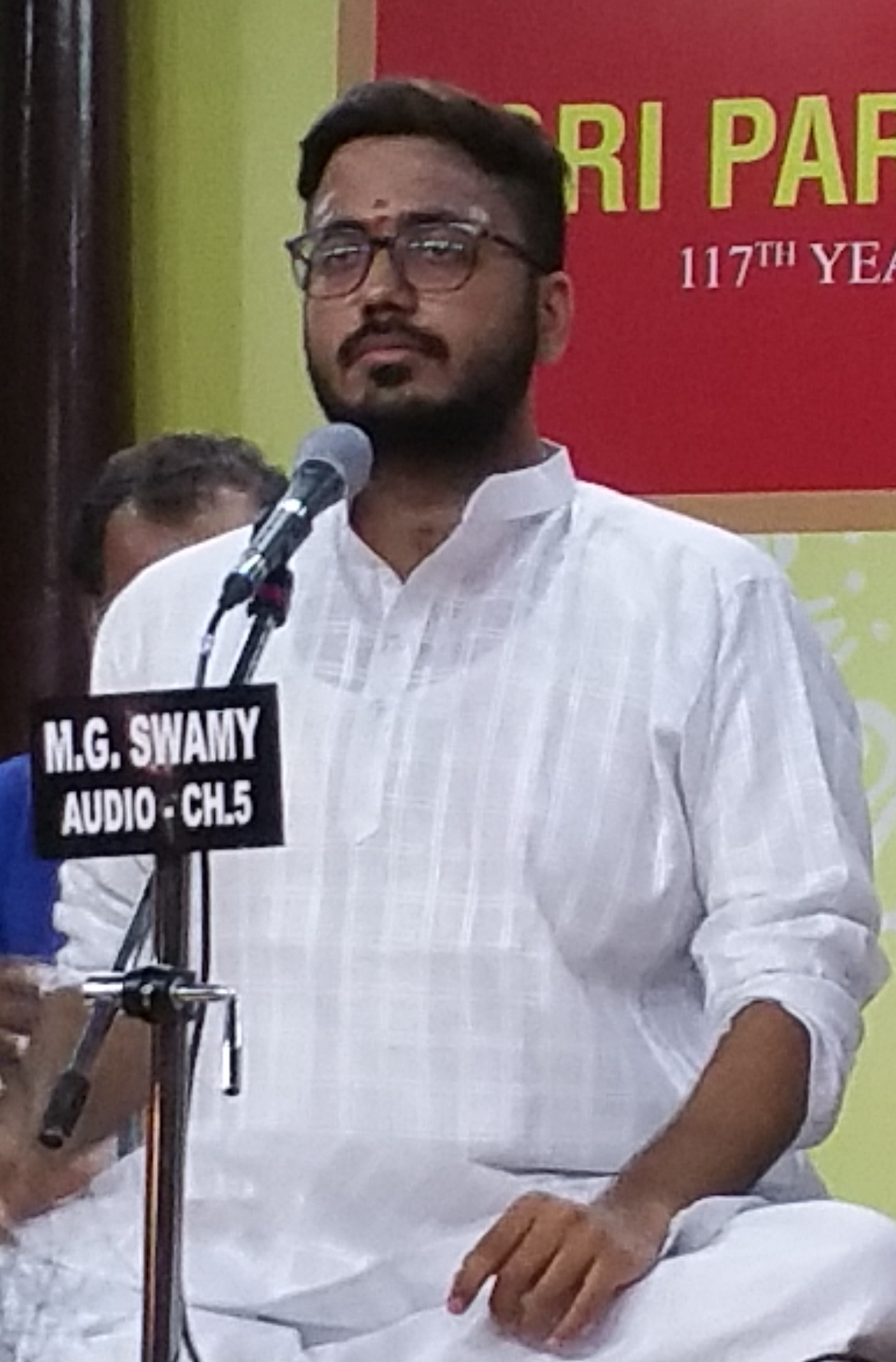
- Bharat Sundar in 2017

Background information
- Born: K. Bharat Sundar; 30 August 1988 (age 38)
- Genre: Carnatic music

K. Bharat Sundar (born 30 August 1988) is an Indian singer from Chennai specialized in Carnatic music.

Bharat Sundar does not come from a family of musicians. Among others, he learned from P. S. Narayanaswamy and S. Sowmya.

Bharat Sundar was awarded the Ustad Bismillah Khan Yuva Puraskar for 2020 by the Sangeet Natak Akademi.

He performed at the annual concerts by the Madras Music Academy since 2017.
