= Ramakrishnan Murthy =

Indian Carnatic singer (born 1989)

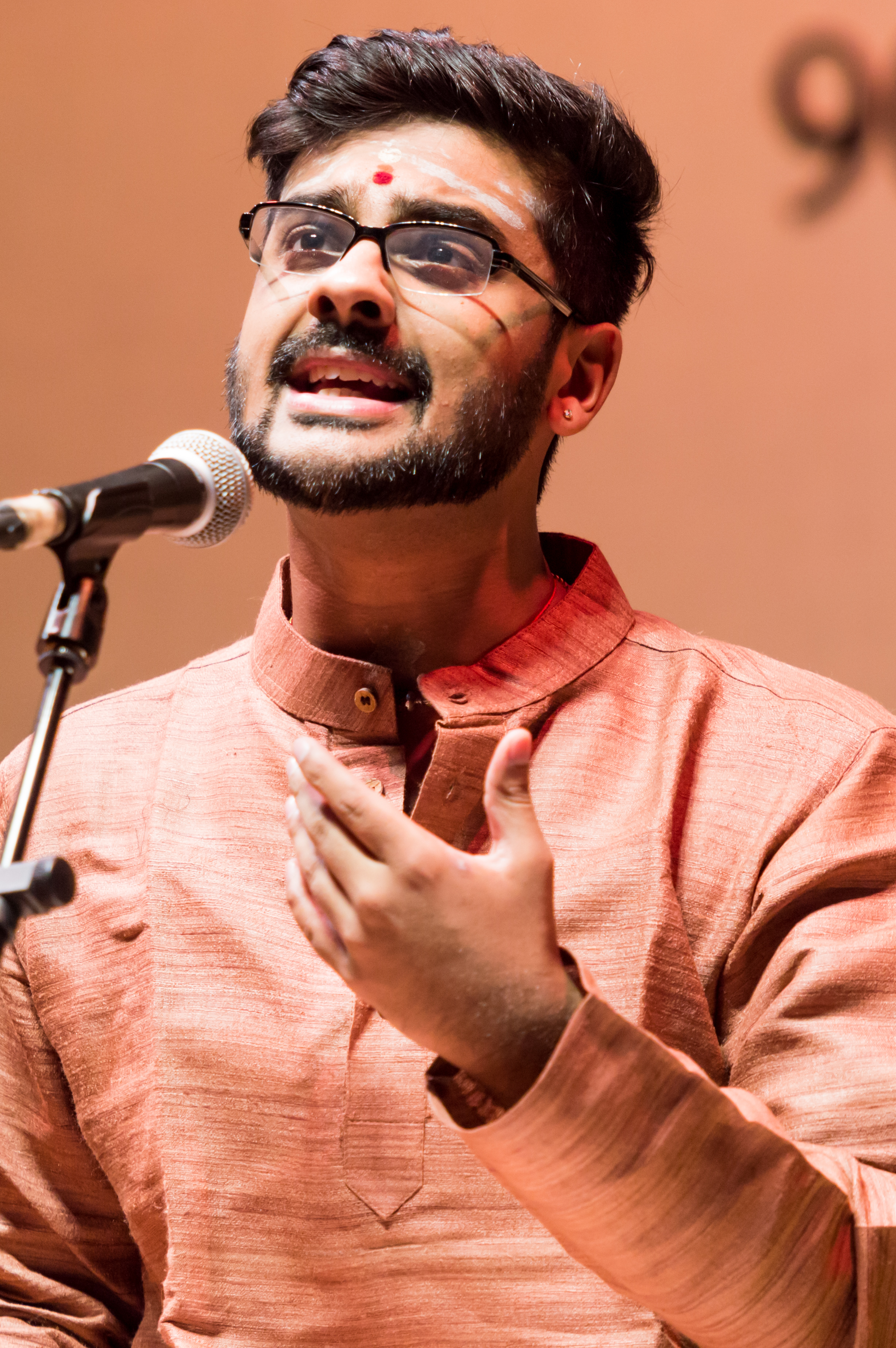

Background information
- Also known as: RKM
- Born: 22 December 1989 (age 36)
- Education: University of California
- Genre: Indian classical music
- Occupation: Carnatic Vocalist

Ramakrishnan Murthy (born 22 December 1989) is a Carnatic Music vocalist from India. He regularly performs in the annual Madras Music Season besides being featured in music festivals world over that focus on Indian Classical music. He is an A-grade artist of the All India Radio and Doordarshan, Chennai.

== Early life and tutelage ==
Ramakrishnan Murthy began his Carnatic music training from Smt. Padma Kutty in Irvine in 1997. In 2001, he began to take advanced lessons from veteran violin artist Delhi P. Sunder Rajan. Ramakrishnan also spent brief periods of time learning from Vairamangalam Lakshmi Narayanan, CR Vaidyanathan, Vaikom Jayachandran and Chengleput Ranganathan. He is currently under the tutelage of R. K. Shriramkumar.

== Education ==
Ramakrishnan Murthy is an Informatics graduate from the University of California, Irvine.

== Concert career ==
In June 2011, after completing his undergraduate education, Ramakrishnan moved to Chennai permanently and began pursuing Carnatic music full time. He has, since, performed regularly in Indian and international music festivals and famous sabhas, including the Madras Music Academy and has been accompanied by virtually all the notable names in the field of music today.

Ramakrishnan has also done playback singing for films, debuting with the song "Nalla Nanban" under composer Harris Jayaraj for Shankar's 2012 film Nanban.

== Style and influences ==
His wise sense of aesthetics, his alignment to pitch(shruthi shuddham), enunciation of words, the clarity of his gamakas and his patanthara are often appreciated by critics.

The influence of Ramnad Krishnan, Semmangudi Srinivasa Iyer, and K. V. Narayanaswamy has been observed in his music.

== Awards and titles ==
- Sangeet Natak Akademi Ustad Bismillah Khan Yuva Puraskar, 2024
- Yagnaraman Award of Excellence, Shri Krishna Gana Sabha, 2016
- Kalki Krishnamurthy Memorial Award, Kalki Krishnamurthy Trust, Chennai, 2014
- Shanmukha Sangeetha Shironmani title from Shanmukhananda Fine Arts and Sangeetha Sabha, Mumbai, 2013.
- Outstanding Vocalist, Madras Music Academy, 2011-2014
- Yogam Nagaswamy Endowment Prize for Best Senior Vocalist, Madras Music Academy, 2016, 2025
- Asthana Vidvan, Sringeri Sharada Peetham, 2017
- Senior Outstanding Concert Award, Madras Music Academy, 2017, 2024
- Senior Outstanding Vocalist, Madras Music Academy, 2019
- Isai Peroli title from Kartik Fine Arts, Chennai
