= Hari Sri Vidya Nidhi School =

- ഹരി ശ്രീ വിദ്യാ നിധി

Location
- Sri Ramakrishna Lane, Punkunnam; Thrissur, Kerala; India; 10.5352°N 76.1985°E

Information
- Type: Private co-educational high school
- Motto: Let the peal of harmony be the appeal of all religions
- Established: 1 September 1978
- Founder: Nalini Chandran
- Administrator: Jayashree Parameswaran
- Principal: Preetha Venugopal
- Faculty: 80
- Grades: PreK–12
- Enrollment: 1500
- Campus: Urban; 3 acres (1.2 ha)
- Houses: Ganga, Godavari, Kaveri, and Krishna
- Colors: Brown and White
- Affiliation: Council for the Indian School Certificate Examinations
- Website: www.harisrividyanidhi.com

Hari Sri Vidya Nidhi School is a private co-educational school in Thrissur, Kerala, India. It offers classes from kindergarten to junior college. The kindergarten school is conducted at the Hari Sri Nursery School near the main campus. Hari Sri Vidya Nidhi School was founded in 1978 by Nalini Chandran who was also the school's first principal. The school is registered as a charitable society and is affiliated to the Council for the Indian School Certificate Examinations, which conducts the Indian Certificate of Secondary Education (ICSE) and Indian School Certificate (ISC) exams.

== Principals ==
- Nalini Chandran (1978–1995, 1999–2000)
- Indira Bhaskaran (1996)
- K. Suma (1997–1999)
- Jayanthi Nair (2001–2014)
- Jaya Nagarajan (2014–2021)
- Preetha Venugopal (2022–present)

== Notable alumni ==
- Lenaa, actress.
- Leona Lishoy, actress.
- Malavika Wales, actress.
- Sreejith Ravi, actor.
- Mahathi, Carnatic singer.
- Trichur Brothers, Carnatic duo.
