= Vittal Ramamurthy =

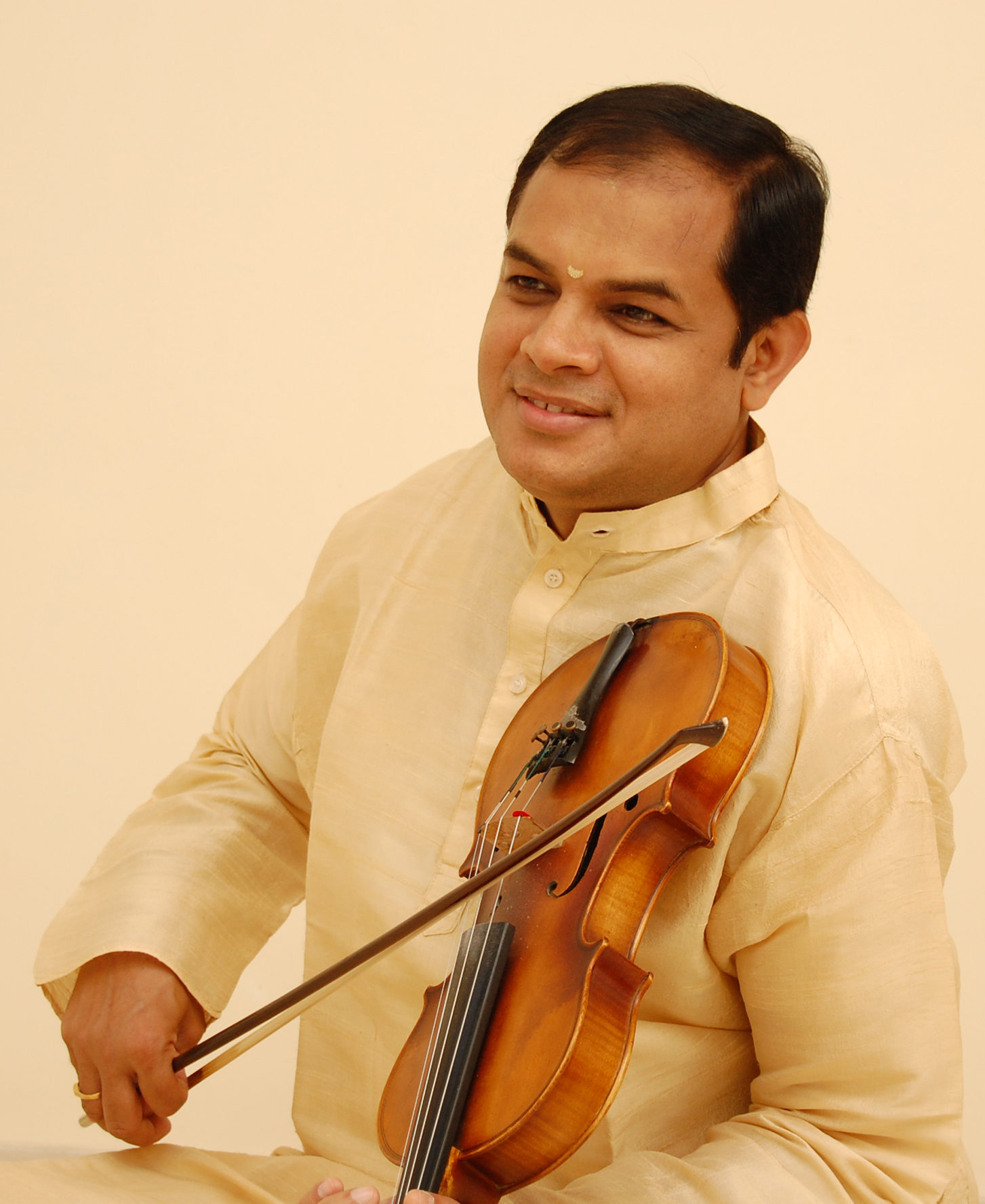

Background information
- Born: Dharmasthala, Karnataka
- Origin: India
- Genres: Indian classical music List of Violinists; Carnatic music
- Occupation: Violinist
- Instrument: Violin
- Website: violinvittal.com

Sri Vittal Ramamurthy (Kannada : ವಿಟ್ಟಲ್ ರಾಮಮೂರ್ತಿ) is a violinist in the Carnatic music tradition of South India.

== Early life ==
Ramamurthy began learning Carnatic music from his mother, Krishnaveni. He was introduced to violin by his grandfather, Sangeethabhushanam B.V. Subba Rao. He is a disciple of Vidwan Lalgudi Jayaraman

== Soloist and accompanist ==
He has performed over 6,000 concerts 25 countries worldwide. He has accompanied Lalgudi Jayaraman in his vocal, violin duet and trio concerts, and has also accompanied veteran vocalists including D. K. Jayaraman, Mangalampalli Balamuralikrishna, R. K. Srikanthan, Nedunuri Krishnamurthy, Madurai T. N. Seshagopalan, O. S. Thyagarajan, T. K. Govinda Rao, T. V. Sankaranarayanan, K. J. Yesudas, Bombay Sisters and Sudha Raghunathan. He has also accompanied the current generation of vocalists, including Vijay Siva, Neyveli Santhanagopalan, Sanjay Subramanian, T. M. Krishna, P. Unni Krishnan, Bombay Jayashri, and S. Sowmya.

He has also accompanied high-profile instrumentalists including N. Ramani (flute), Kadri Gopalnath (saxophone), N. Ravikiran (Chitravina), and Shashank Subramanyam (flute). He participated in the World Music Festival at the Théâtre de la Ville, Paris, and other international festivals in Singapore and Dubai.

== Teacher and musicologist ==
Vittal Ramamurthy has students in India, USA, Canada, Australia, and France. As a musicologist, he has delivered demonstration lectures and workshops at Rice University (Houston), Concordia University (Montreal,) and Harvard University (Boston)

Vittal Ramamurthy and his family organize summer camps each year in his hometown of Karunbithil, Nidle Dharmasthala in Karnataka. About 250 children from surrounding villages attend the camp, which is fully funded by Rammamurthy's family
