= O. S. Thyagarajan =

Indian carnatic singer (1947–2023)

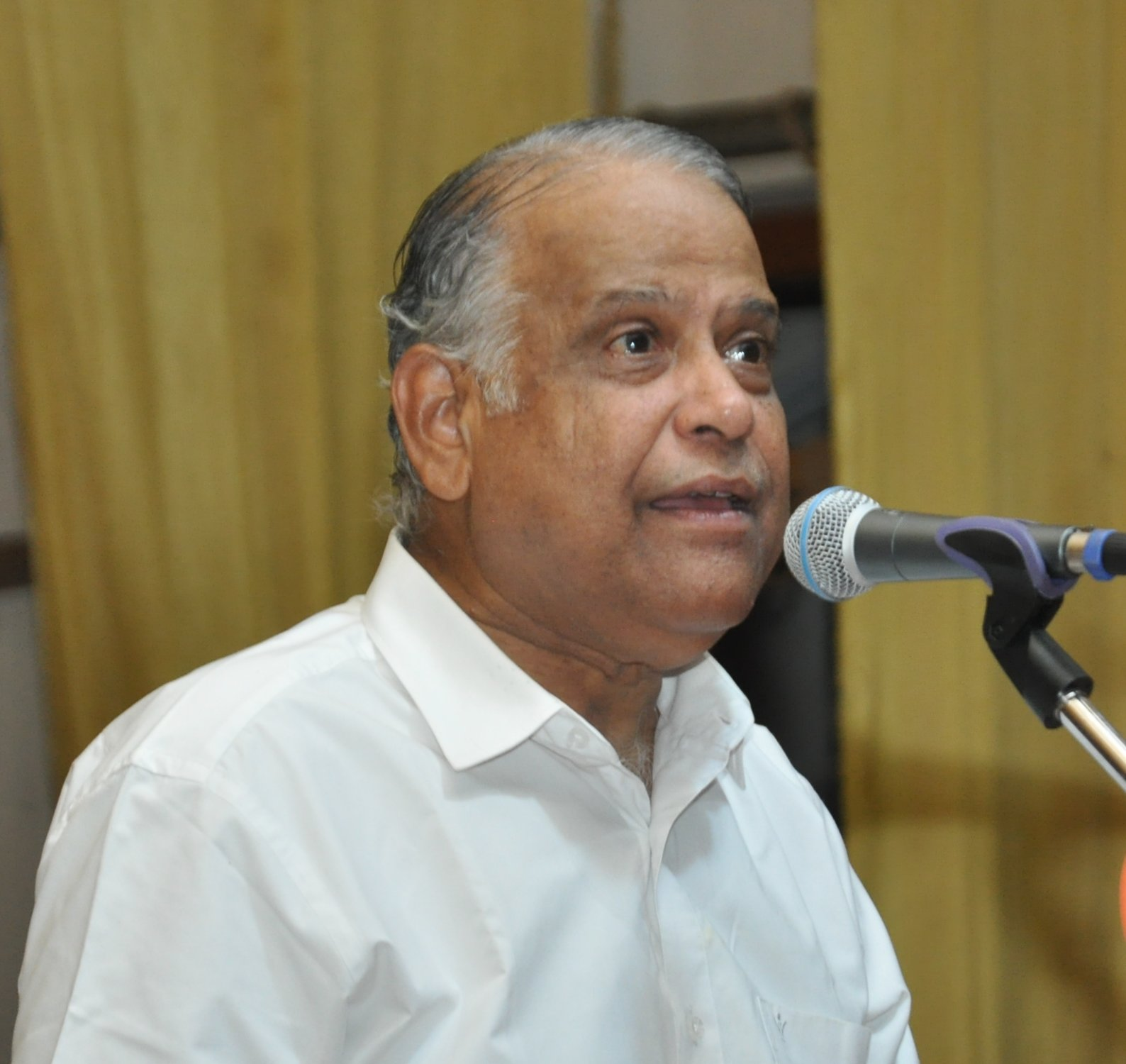

Background information
- Also known as: OST
- Born: 3 April 1947
- Origin: Tanjavur, Madras Province, British India
- Died: 31 December 2023 (aged 76)
- Genres: Indian classical music
- Occupation: Singer

Ombathuveli Subrahmanyam Thyagarajan (3 April 1947 – 31 December 2023) was an Indian carnatic musician based in Chennai.

== Biography ==
Born on 3 April 1947, he was the son and disciple of Sangeetha Booshanam O.V.Subrahmanyam. He learnt music from Sangeetha Kalanidhi T. M. Thiagarajan, while Padmabhushan Lalgudi Jayaraman provided guidance/mentorship early in his career. An ‘A-Top’ graded artist of the All India Radio and of Doordarshan, he gave a large number of concerts, and was considered one of the eminent artists of his generation. He was regularly featured by all leading sabhas in Chennai as well as throughout India and was accompanied by top accompanists such as Lalgudi Shri.G.Jayaraman, M.S. Gopalakrishnan, V.V. Subrahmanyam on violin, Palghat Mani Iyer, Dr T.K.Murthy, Palghat Raghu, Karaikudi Mani, Trichy Sankaran, Umayalpuram Sivaraman on mridangam, Shri.G Harishankar on Kanjira and Vikku Vinayakaram on Ghatam. He toured many countries, including the USA, Canada, Australia, Singapore, the Middle East, Malaysia, Hong Kong, South Africa, and many cities in Europe. He worked as Dean and Faculty of Fine Arts at Annamalai University for 5 years. Thyagarajan trained many disciples who are active on the concert circuit. He died on 31 December 2023, at the age of 76.

== Awards and honours ==
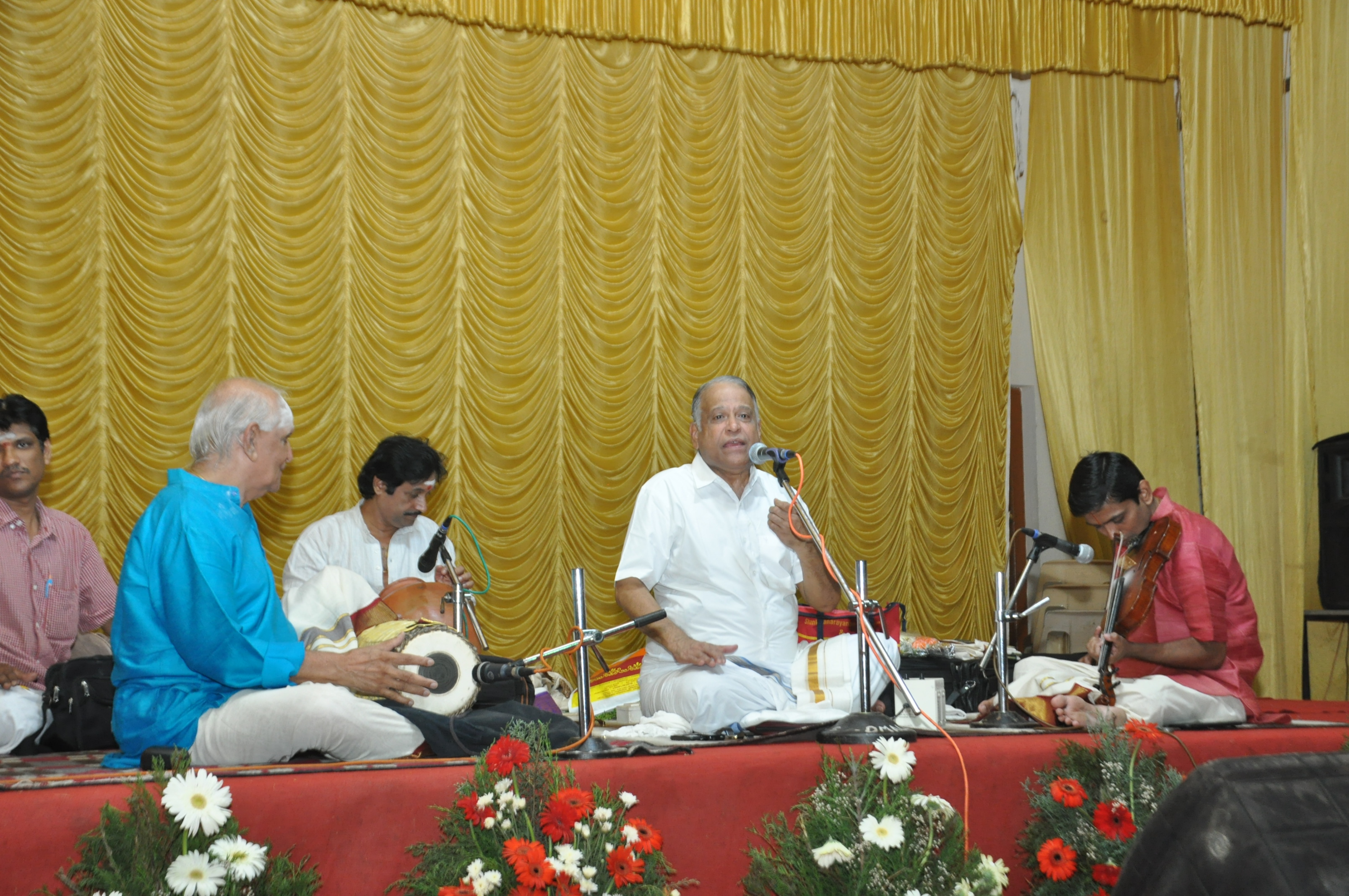
Umayalpuram K. Sivaraman with O. S. Thyagarajan

- Sangeetha Natak Academi Puraskar (Sangeetha Natak Academi)
- Sangeetha Choodamani (Sri Krishna Gana Sabha, Chennai)
- Sangeetha Kala Sagara (Kalasagaram, Hyderabad)
- Nada Gana Kala Praveena (Sangeetha Samraj, Madurai)
- Nadha Booshanam (Shanmukananda Sangeetha Sabha, New Delhi)
- Vani kala sudakara (Vani Mahal)
- GNB award (Indian Fine Arts)
- Kalasironmani (Chennai cultural academy)

== Discography ==
Year	Album	Label
1997	Manodharma	Magnasound/OMI
2000	Kshetra Maala	Music Today/Living Media India
2004	Raja Gopalam	Saregama
2004	Durusuga Krupajoochi	Saregama
2004	Karunanidhiyilalo	Saregama
2006	December Season 2003	Charsur

== See also ==
- List of Carnatic singers
