= Vedavathi Prabhakar =

Indian carnatic classical music singer

Vedavathi Prabhakar Rao
- Genre: Carnatic music
- Occupation: Classical Vocalist

Vedavathi Prabhakar Rao is an Indian carnatic classical music singer. She has sung light classical music in concerts, radio programmes, films, and temple devotionals.

== Awards ==
She has received Kirti Puraskar from Telugu University in 2013 for her poetic works.
