= Ashok Rajagopalan =

Indian writer and artist

Ashok Rajagopalan (also known under the blogging pseudonym Kenny Wordsmith) is an Indian writer and artist for over 500 children's books. Rajagopalan has also worked as a graphic designer, freelance cartoonist, and has contributed to the children's magazines Impulse Hoot and Impulse Toot. He first began illustrating children's stories with a piece in the 1989 magazine Junior Quest. Before working in illustration Rajagopalan received a mechanical engineering diploma and worked as a marketing executive, but found that he disliked the experience. In 2011 he participated in a Kickstarter campaign to fund a comic he was co-creating with the artist Asvin Srivatsangam entitled Neelakshi:The Quest for Amrit.

Neelakshi:The Quest for Amrit will be published Yali Dream Creations by end of 2013.

He will be working on Yali Dream Creations' first novel with a tentative title 'Kandiva'.

== Selected bibliography ==
Authored:

- Witchsnare - Penguin India
- Iliad Retold - New Horizons
- Odyssey Retold - New Horizons

Illustrated & Authored:

- Sketch with Ashok Raj - a series of 3 books - Scholastic India
- Gajapati Kulapati - Tulika Publishers
- Gajapati Kulapati Kalabalooosh! - Tulika Publishers

Illustrated:

- Eecha Poocha - Tulika Publishers
- Andaman’s Boy - Tulika Publishers
- Sunu sunu Snail - Storm in the Garden - Tulika Publishers
- Birdywood Buzz - Tulika Publishers
- That’s My Daddy - Scholastic India
- Jataka Tales - Scholastic India
- Marine Life - Scholastic India
- The Runaway Peppercorn - – Tulika Publishers
- Grandma’s Eyes - Tulika Publishers
- Dosa - Tulika Publishers
- A Silly Story of Bondapalli - Tulika Publishers
- The Shining Stones - Tulika Publishers
- Dancing Bees - Tulika Publishers
- Thakitta Tharikitta Bouncing Ball - Tulika Publishers
- 4 books in the Thumb Thumb Series - Tulika Publishers
- Black Panther - Tulika Publishers
- The Spider’s Web - Tulika Publishers
- Gasa Gasa Para Para - Tulika Publishers
- India’s Olympic Story - Tulika Publishers
- Read Aloud Stories - Tulika Publishers
