= R. Radhakrishnan =

R. Radhakrishnan may refer to:

- R. Radhakrishnan (literary critic), American writer
- R. Radhakrishnan (politician, born 1971)
- R. Radhakrishnan (INC politician)

== See also ==
- Radhakrishnan (name)
