= Trichur Brothers =

Indian Carnatic classical musician duo

- Members: Srikrishna Mohan; Ramkumar Mohan

Srikrishna Mohan and Ramkumar Mohan are Carnatic classical musicians. The title Trichur Brothers was conferred by HH Jayendra Saraswathi Maha Swamigal of Kanchi Mutt.

Their father is veteran Mridangam Vidwan Shri Trichur R Mohan. Their music journey started quite early, under the able guidance of their father. Their style of music is very much appreciated.

== Biography ==
The Trichur Brothers were initially trained by Madurai Shrimati Balamani Eswar and Shri Thamarakkadu Govindan Namboothiri. They received advanced training, with emphasis on Manodharma singing, from Late Professor Neyyattinkara Mohanachandran. They were fortunate to be under the guidance of Padma Bhushan, Shri PS Narayana Swami for more than a decade, after they moved to Chennai. The brothers are currently learning from Shri Reju Narayanan.

Their style of raga exploration, which involves the exchange of melodic phrases between them, has been lauded for its uniqueness. While adhering to the traditions and essence of Carnatic music, they have also forayed into world music in their collaborations through their fusion band, Anubhoothi, and performed jugalbandis with renowned Hindustani classical musicians.

The brothers are qualified Chartered Accountants and completed their schooling from Hari Sri Vidya Nidhi School, Thrissur.

== Albums ==
- Musically Yours
- Panchalinga Kshetra Kritis
- Rama Bhakthi Samrajyam
- Musically Yours 2
- Live Concerts Compilation

== Productions ==
- Shiva Thandav
- Namami Gange
- Vandhe Bharathambe
- Hanuman Chalisa
- Ganesha Pancharathna Stotra
- One with the Tanpura
- Mera Ram Mera Pran - released on Ram Navami 2024
  - Retweeted by Honorable Prime Minister Narendra Modiji
