= Chinmaya Sisters =

Chinmaya Sisters Uma & Radhika
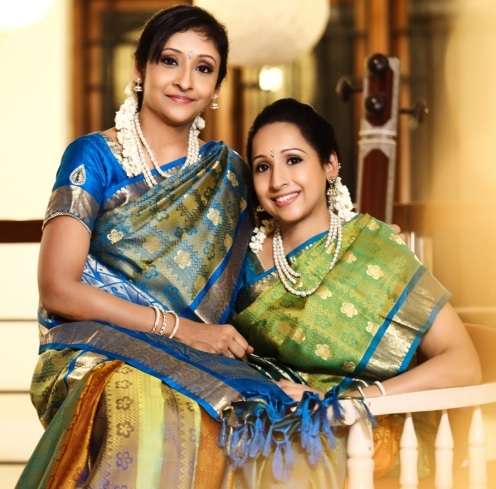

Background information
- Genre: Carnatic music
- Occupation: singers
- Instrument: vocal
- Website: http://chinmayasisters.com

The Chinmaya Sisters, Uma and Radhika, are a Carnatic music singing duo.

== Early life ==
The sisters were taught Carnatic music by their mother Bhavani Natesan, and went on to receive training from T. N. Seshagopalan and Neyveli Santhanagopalan.

== Musical career ==
Their first concert was in 1992 in the "Spirit of Youth" Series of the Music Academy. In 2003 they were invited by Carnatic Music Association of North America-New Jersey for a concert to perform in USA. They have also performed in the music series organised by Kamban Kazhagam in Colombo-SriLanka. later in 2018 the duo performed in Navarasam, a thematic concert organised by Rasikapriya Fine Arts Academy. later they have performed at the Swaralaya Samanwayam Festival held in Palakkad. they have become a regular performer and part of the Margazhi season music festival. They have also given performance in Doordarshan & they are ‘A’ graded artists of All India Radio.

== Discography ==
Performed for "Naada Vaibavam" of "Art of Living" in which 5000 musicians group rendition

== Awards ==
- "Vani Kala Nipuna" from Sri Thyaga Brahma Gana Sabha in 2012
- "Yuva Kala Bharathi" from Bharath Kalachar in 2006
