= Saketharaman =

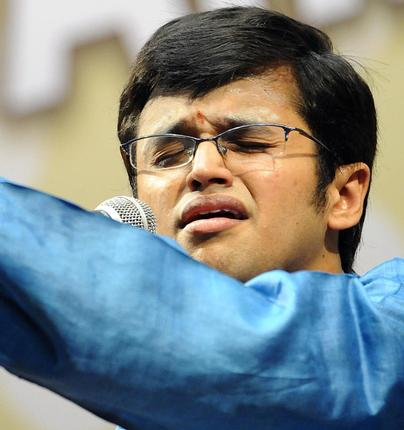

Background information
- Born: 24 November 1982 (age 42); Thanjavur, Tamil Nadu, India
- Genres: Carnatic Music
- Occupation: Carnatic Musician - Vocalist
- Years active: 1992–present
- Website: https://saketharaman.com

Saketharaman (born 24 November 1982) is one of the top performing musicians of Carnatic music in India. He is a prime disciple of Padmabushan Shri Lalgudi Jayaraman. He started learning carnatic vocal from Late Srirangam Krishnamurthy Rao at the age of 4. Subsequently, he learnt under Late Smt. Savitri Satyamurthy. He has learnt several Padams and Javalis from Smt Geetha Raja. He currently learns rare kirthanas of Trinity and other yesteryear composers from Vid Shri Nagai Muralidharan. He also learns voice culture and Hindustani music from Sangeetha Kalanidhi Shri TV Gopalakrishnan.

== Composer ==
Saketharaman has composed more than 100 Pallavis, which are featured regularly in his concerts. These have been composed in rare Thalas. Several thematic pallavis such as "SaptaSwara SaptaRaga SaptaThala", "Ashta Gowlai", "Swarakshara", "Ranjani mala", "Pancha Ranga Kshetra", "Tamil Isai", "Mysuru City" have been composed by Saketharaman.

== Tunesmith ==
Saketharaman also dons the hat of a tunesmith. He has tuned several Mira Bhajans, Purandaradasa Devaranamas, compositions of Annamacharyar, Kanakadasa, Sadhasiva Brahmendral and Subramania Bharathiar. He presented a full-fledged 2.5 hour concert of Shri Adhi Shankaracharyar's works that were set to tune by him in Bengaluru Gayana Samaj. He has also presented an exclusive concert on "vada naadu Divya Desams" of Alwar pasurams, set to tune by him.

== Crossover with Saketh ==
Crossover with Saketh, a brainchild of Vidwan Saketharaman, is a web series intended to enhance the listening experience of Carnatic music. The objective is that the common man should be able to enjoy listening to Carnatic music without any barriers. Crossover is a smash hit, especially with the millennials. Won accolades all over and was featured in Sankara TV Super Singer.

== Samuditha Foundation ==
Founded by Vidwan Saketharaman in the year 2020 with a motto of "carnatic music for all". The foundation operates various projects under its auspices -Kalashiksha School, "Penum Pannum " annual concerts etc. The Samuditha Award of Excellence, which includes a cash award, is given for outstanding contribution in Fine Arts.

== Pennum Pannum ==
This annual concert celebrates women composers, bringing forth the contributions by the women composers. The first "Pennum Pannum " concert was held in 2021 at the prestigious Narada Gana Sabha, on the eve of Women's day. The Samuditha Award of Excellence was given to Dr Alamelu Ramakrishnan for her brilliant book on Women composers. The award was given by Founder Vidwan Saketharaman, Shriram Groups MD Akhila Srinivasaa, Dr Nithayasree Mahadevan and popular orator Bharathi Bhaskar.

== Kala Shiksha ==
Saketharaman runs a music school called Kala Shiksha. Over 200 school students learn Carnatic music, Nama Sankeerthanam and Tamil Isai in this school. Objective is to teach Carnatic music, Nama Sankeerthanam and Tamil Isai to all, regardless of economic and social barriers.

== Divya Desa Sangeetha Yatrai ==
Divya Desa Sangeetha Yatrai is a web series-a musical journey to all the Divya Desams. There will be at least one Pasuram of the 12 Alwars that will be sung on every Divya Desam, along with explanation of the Pasuram and the significance of the Divya Desam. The Pasurams are either pre-tuned by legendary carnatic musicians or set to tune by Vidwan Saketharaman or sung in Virutham or free style format. This is available for listening at Saketharaman's official youtube channel.

== Awards ==
Title / Award	Presented By	Year
Best performer, adjudged by audience poll	Learn Quest Music Conference, Boston	2019
Gold medal for Outstanding Ragam Thanam Pallavi	Music Academy, Chennai	2018
Yuva Kala Ratna	PSG Institutions, Coimbatore	2017
M. S. Subhalakshmi Award	Narada Gana Sabha, Chennai	2016
Yuva Puraskar	Sangeet Natak Akademy, Delhi	2014
Isai Peroli	Karthik Fine Arts, Chennai	2014
Vani Kala Nipuna	Thyaga Brahma Gaana Sabha, Vani Mahal, Chennai	2014
Shanmukha Sangeetha Shiromani	Shanmuganandha Sabha, Mumbai	2012
Vocational Excellence award	Rotary Club, Chennai	2012
Kalki Krishnamurthy Award	Kalki Tamil Magazine	2011
Yuva Kala Bharathi	Bharath Kalachar Chennai	2008
Best vocalist	Music Academy Chennai	for 3 consecutive years
Yagnaraman Award of Excellence for music	Krishna Gana Sabha	2008
Maharajapuram Viswanatha Iyer Youth Excellence Award	Maharajapuram Viswanatha Iyer Trust	2007
Ramabhadran centenary award	Tag centre Chennai	2006

== Discography ==
Here is a comprehensive list of his albums
Vandhaan Raghuraman Saketharaman Live at Paris-Swathi Soft Solutions 2012
Saketharaman, Live concert 2010 in Narada Gana Sabha -Charsur
Aatma Nivedhanam 2009 -Swathi Soft Solutions along with Vidwan Shri Umayalpuram Sivaraman and Vidwan Shri Mysore Nagaraj
Nadha Geetham 2009-Amudham
Saketharaman, Live concert 2008 in Bharath Sangeeth Utsav-Carnatica
Live concert 2001 in Naradha Gana Sabha- His Master's Voice

== Personal life ==
Saketharaman's mother, Vijaya Santhanam, is a postgraduate in Chemistry and an ardent follower of Shri Shri Krishna Premi Swamigal. His father, Santhanam, is a Chartered Accountant. His elder sister, Vishaka Hari is a well known Harikatha exponent. His wife, Vidhya, is a doctor. The couple reside in Chennai and have a daughter and a son.
