= Vishakha Hari =

Popular Carnatic musician

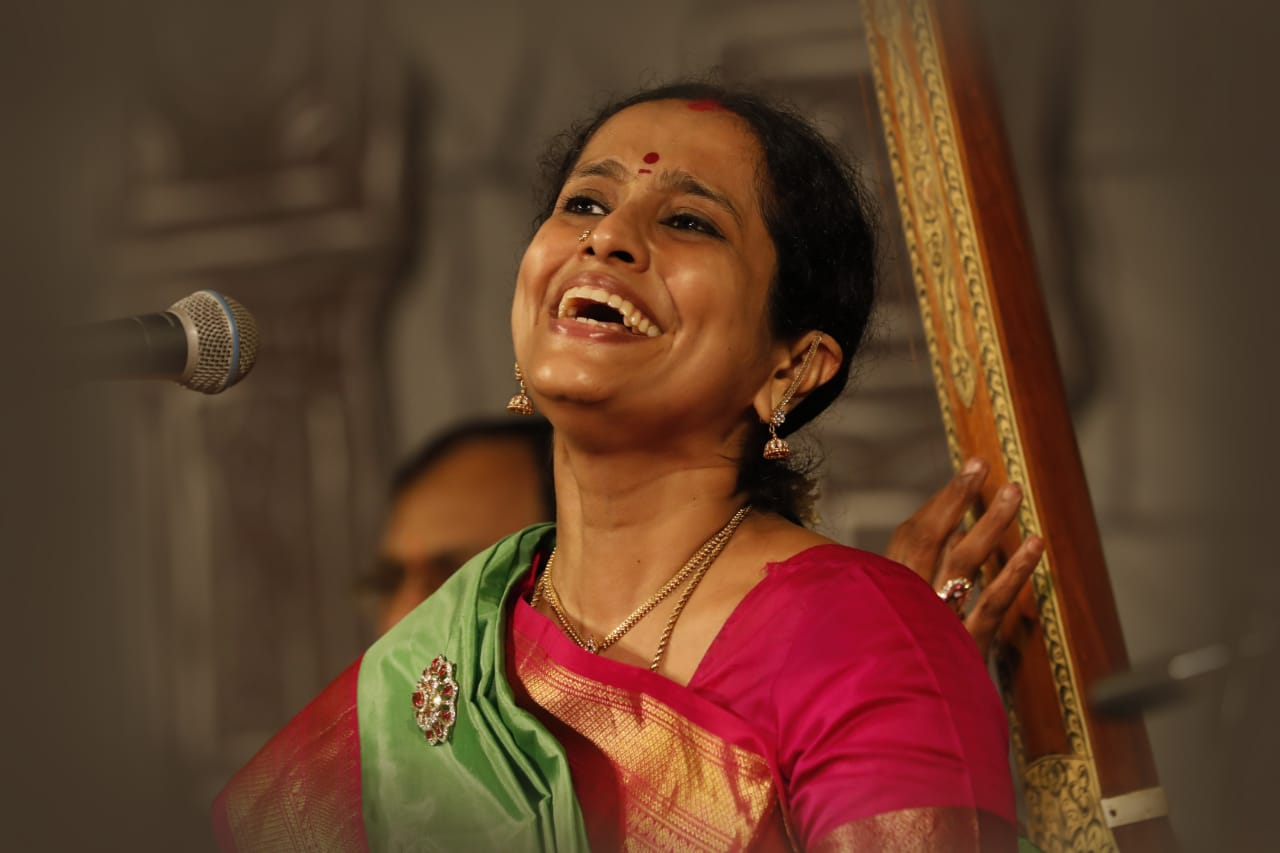
Vishakha Hari Vishakha Hari performing at a Harikatha program
- Born: 3 September 1978 (age 48)
- Genre: Indian classical music
- Occupation: Vocalist

Vishakha Hari is a madhava Carnatic music vocalist and proponent of Harikatha, a form of Hindu storytelling. She is a mentor dedicated to instilling art and creativity within the education of children, who she believes are the torchbearer of culture. She is also an author and the founder of Vijayashri School of Harikatha, a free e-paatashaala dedicated to teaching the ancient art of Harikatha to young children worldwide.

== Early days ==
Vishakha Hari's father, Santhanam, is a chartered accountant. Her mother, Vijaya Santhanam, completed studies in chemistry and followed a spiritual guru, Paranur Sri Krishnapremi Anna (Sri Sri Anna), who later became Visakha Hari's father-in-law. Her younger brother Saketharaman is also a Carnatic music vocalist.

Vishakha Hari received formal Carnatic music training from Lalgudi Jayaraman from the age of 6 and Bharata natyam training from Sudharani Raghupathy. She had no formal training in Harikatha. Her early and elaborate training in classical music has helped her convey the essence of ancient Indian texts in an eloquent manner.

Viskha Hari studied commerce and completed qualifications as a chartered accountant. She also secured an All India First in Direct Taxes, and is an Academic.

She married Sri Hari, a Harikatha exponent, and when she was 22, her father-in-law encouraged her to tell stories during her musical performances.

== Musical career ==
Since 2006, Vishakha Hari has performed in several sabhas during the Chennai Music Season. An artist of All India Radio, she has given discourses and concerts abroad.

Vishakha Hari also occasionally performs with her husband, Sri Hari, who uses his English literary background to supplement her kathakalakshepam performances. She has also performed on Jaya TV.

Vishakha Hari performs Harikatha on various topics Based on Srimad Ramayanam, Srimad Bhagavatham and Skanda puranam. She also performs from Srisrianna's works such as: Sri Vaishnava Samhitha; Sri Brindavana Mahatmyam; Divya Desa Vaibhavam; Harikatha Amritha Lahari; Sri Bhakthapurisha Stavam; Sati vijayam, Shatakams and Keerthanas.

She presents Harikathas in the narrative Tamil or English, and the songs are from various languages including Telugu, Kannada, Marathi, Hindi and Sanskrit. Her reach is wide due to her performances outside Chennai in English. She has also released six DVDs.

== Contributions ==
Vishakha Hari is devoted to passing on the good values and dharma of Indian tradition to future generations. She founded the Vijayashri School of Harikatha in February 2020 to inspire students to pursue Harikatha as their vocational subject.

She has helped raise funds for various charities, including Cancer patients for Vasantha Memorial Cancer Centre, special children affected with Down syndrome, mentally challenged patients, heart patients at Narayana Hrudayalaya, destitutes and orphans at Sai Samskrutalaya, at Prathyarpana Foundation, and Rama temple at Delhi.

== Awards and recognition ==
She has received medals, prizes and other awards for her contributions to the Harikatha and Carnatic music fields.*

- Received the Vasantashreshtha, that is the 'woman par excellence' award, from the hands of her music guru Sri Lalgudi Jayaraman and the Thyagarja Pratidhwani or 'echo of Thyagaraja Swami' title from her spiritual guru and father-in-law Sri Krishna Premi Swamigal.
- Smt Vishaka hari was awarded Dr. M.S. Subbulakshmi Centenary Award at a ceremony in Mumbai Sri Shamukhananda Fine Arts and Sangeetha Sabha on 13th of September 2016.She is one amongst seven of India's most-respected women artistes.
- On 20 November 2016, Bharitya Vidya Bhavan, Chennai decorated Smt Vishaka Hari with the 'Lifetime Achievement' award by the guest of the day Infosys chairman, R. Seshasayee.

She has also spoken on “Role of education in international development” at the U.K House of Commons.
