= Palghat Parameswara Bhagavathar =

Indian singer and composer

Palghat Parameswara Bhagavathar (1815–1892) was a Carnatic music composer and musician born in the Nurani neighborhood of Palakkad city in Kerala, India.
