= Bombay Lakshmi Rajagopalan =

Lakshmi Rajagopalan
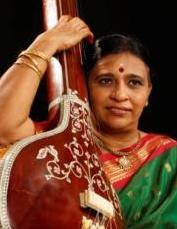

Background information
- Born: 12 March 1959; Matunga, Mumbai, India
- Genre: Indian Carnatic music
- Occupation: Carnatic Vocalist
- Years active: 1970-till date
- Website: http://www.bombaylakshmi.tripod.com/

Lakshmi Rajagopalan (born 12 March 1959) is a leading Carnatic vocalist in India.

== Early life and background ==
Lakshmi was born in Matunga, a suburb in Mumbai, to Mrs. Radha and Mr. T. V. Panchapakesan. She has four sisters who have also been honed in music. She started learning music at the age of 3 from her mother and was equally well supported by her father. She did her graduation in Commerce from Mumbai University and C.A.I.I.B. from Indian Institute of Bankers. She completed a 5-year music course at Bharatiya Music & Fine Arts, in Mumbai. Later she underwent 2 years of advanced and rigorous training in Raagam, Thanam and Pallavi under the tutelage of Smt T.R. Balamani.

As a child, she won major competitions and was awarded a prize at the age of eight from Bharat Ratna M. S. Subbulakshmi.

Lakshmi has won several gold medals and also the prestigious Tambura prize in various competitions conducted by Music Academy, Indian Fine Arts Society, Chennai, Sri Shanmukhananda Fine Arts Mumbai and other Sabhas.

She was in managerial cadre with Bank of Baroda and took VRS to pursue her career in Carnatic Music.

She has participated by representing her bank in All India Inter Bank Music competition and has always won the first prize and the rolling trophy.

== Singing Style ==
Lakshmi does not keep any notes or hints during the Kacheri which reveal the depth in Carnatic knowledge. Her voice is majestic and soothing. Her singing style follows the traditions of legendary Carnatic singers such as Semmangudi mama, MS, DKP to name a few.

== Performances ==
Smt. Lakshmi Rajagopalan has sung in various popular stages and in many TV channels including Jaya TV, Amrita TV, Sri Shankara, SVBC, DD Podhigai and Asianet. She has performed in All India Radio & Doordarshan Kendra as an ‘A’ Grade Artist. She has already performed twice in national program in AIR and Doordarshan. Being residing in Navi Mumbai she regularly performs in almost all popular sabha's in Mumbai and other states in India and abroad. She has also conducted lecture cum demonstrations in Mumbai at Shivali Cultural Society, Kalamanjari and at Navarasa Music Academy.

Lakshmi is a Carnatic classical vocalist whose career spans over seven languages, including Tamil, Hindi, Malayalam, Kannada, Telugu, Marathi, and Sanskrit. She frequently performs alongside students who provide accompaniment on the mridangam, kanjira, and thavil.

== Awards and recognition ==
"Swara Lavanyam" award from Lavanya Institute of traditional art in the year 2024.

Received "Life time achievement" award from PVR event masters in the year 2023.

Some notable awards to include,

Tabla ThathaChari Award in Chennai in the year 2010

Maharajapuram Vishvanatha Iyer award for a senior musician.

Dr. A. P. J. Abdul Kalam International Excellence award from Dubai.

Vocational Excellence Award from Rotary Club of Navi Mumbai.

== Titles ==
She has been conferred the title of "Shyma Sastri Sangeetha Rathna " award during the shyma sastri festival 2024 at Kanchipuram.

She has been conferred the title of “Asthana Vidhushi” & awarded the title of “Sangeeta Visharada” by Sri Sri Jagadguru Sankaracharya of Badari Sakatapuram Sreevidya Peetam.

She also has been conferred of “Sangeeta Sevamani” by Sri Sri Jagadguru Jayendra Saraswathi of Kanchi kamakoti Peetam.

She has also been conferred the title of “Asthana Vidushi” by Sri Sri Jagadguru Vanamamalai Jeeyar Swamigal, Nanguneri.

She has also been conferred the title of “Sangeetha Kovidha” from Gayathri Fine Arts, New Delhi.

She has also been conferred the title of “Sangeetha Bhushana” by Sriranjani Sangeetha Sabha, Mumbai.

She has also been conferred the title of “Guru Seva Rathna” from Anushathin Anugraham at the hands of Mr. Indira Soundar Rajan.

== Audio Releases ==
To her credit, she has released several following audio CD.

1. Bakthi Manjari three Volumes 1,2,3.

2. Kanchi Sankara

3. Devi Saranam

4. Carnatic Classical

== Press releases ==
Her concerts are highly rated and many positive reviews have been published. Some of them are listed here.

1. DNA-navi Mumbai : 20 November 2007 Keertananjali's Carnatic treat enthralls audience

2. NEW BOMBAY −23. 11.2007 Bombay Lakshmi Rajagopalan's Diwali Musical Fireworks

3. THE HINDU 12 January 2007 Casting a magic spell

4. DNA – Navi Mumbai 20 May 2006

5. IN NEW BOMBAY 20 to 26 May 2006 Stalwart Smt.LakshmiRajagopalan's Magnificent Concert

6. THE HINDU, New Delhi QUALITY MUSIC

7. The Indian Express, New Delhi Singing from the heart

8. THE INDIAN POST, KOLKATA Good song selection

9. THE INDIAN POST, KOLKATA Great Singer

10. FREE PRESS JOURNAL Melody & mime

11. THE INDIAN EXPRESS, MUMBAI Pleasing Concert

12. THE HINDU – 30 May 2008 Music that marks a puritan
