= Nisha Rajagopalan =

Indian singer (born 1980)

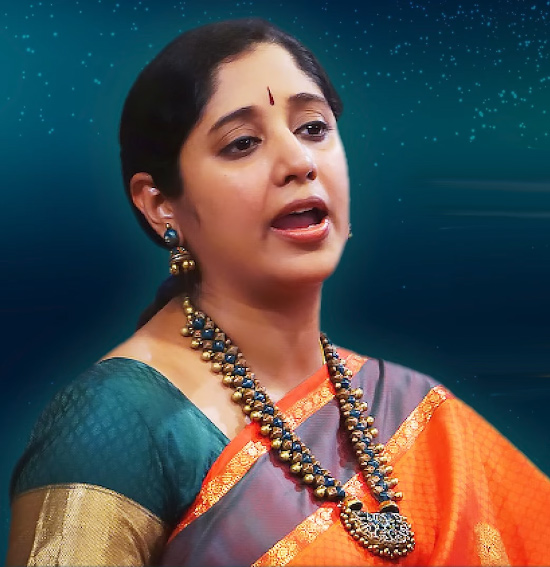
- Nisha Rajagopal singing in a concert

Background information
- Born: October 22, 1980 (age 45)
- Occupation: Carnatic musician

Nisha P. Rajagopalan (Tamil: நிஷா ராஜகோபாலன்) (born 22 October 1980), is a Carnatic musician. Her mother, Vasundhara Rajagopal, is an established disciple of Gopala Iyer, a descendant of Koteeswara Iyer, the prominent composer. Nisha commenced her training in vocal music from her mother, and later received training from T. R. Subramaniam, Calcutta Krishnamoorthy, Suguna Varadachary, and P. S. Narayanswamy.

She is an A grade artiste of All India Radio, Chennai and an accredited artiste with the Indian Council for Cultural Relations (ICCR).

== Family ==
Nisha was resident in Toronto, Canada with her parents as her father Rajagopalan was employed there. She is the middle one of three daughters. She moved with her mother and sisters to New Delhi to learn music from Professor T. R. Subramaniam. In 1995 her father found a job in Chennai and they all moved to Chennai. Nisha's husband Arvind is a pilot. They have a son, Vidyut, born in 2014.

== Awards and felicitations ==
She has received the following awards:

- The Hindu Saregama M S Subbulakshmi Award (first ever recipient of the award) (2011)
- Isai Peroli (Kartik Fine Arts)
- Kalki Krishnamurthy Memorial Award (Kalki Krishnamurthy Memorial Trust)
- Shanmukha Sangeetha Shiromani Award (Sri Shanmukhananda Fine Arts and Sangeetha Sabha)
- Outstanding Lady Vocalist (The Music Academy)
