= Bangalore Gayana Samaja =

Indian cultural organization

- ಬೆಂಗಳೂರು ಗಾಯನ ಸಮಾಜ
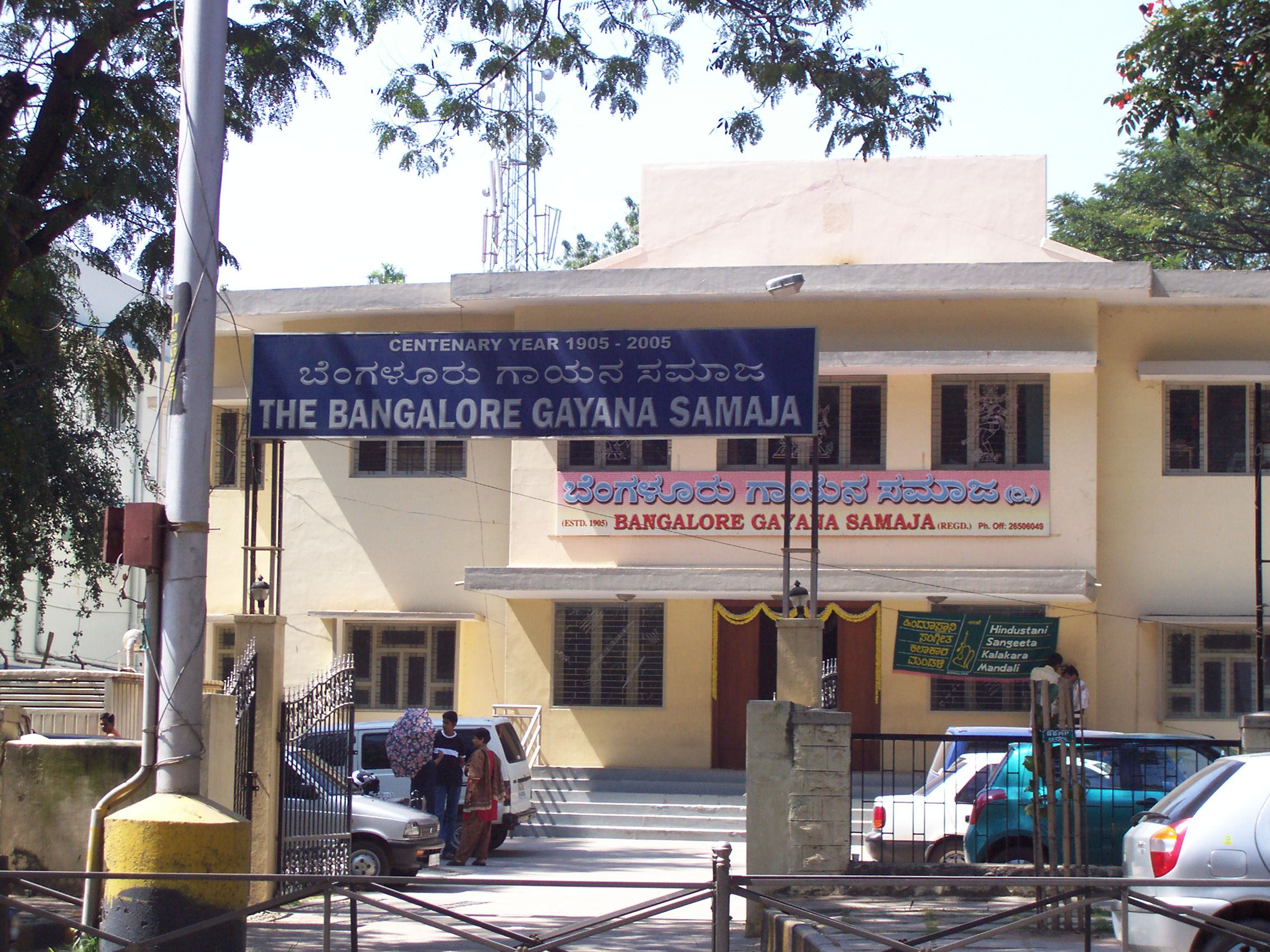
- Formation: 1905
- Type: Sabhā
- Location: K.R. Road, Bangalore, Karnataka, India

Bangalore Gayana Samaja (Kannada: ಬೆಂಗಳೂರು ಗಾಯನ ಸಮಾಜ) is one of the oldest cultural organisations in Bangalore and was established in 1905. It is the oldest operational sabhā (or arts society) in India. The organisation focuses on various Indian forms of Indian music such as Carnatic music, Hindustani music, devotional, light music, Harikathe, folk music and theatre along with various Indian dance forms such as Bharatanatya, Kuchipudi, Kathak, Kathakali, Chau, Odissi and Manipuri.

== History ==
The organisation was founded in 1905 and celebrated its centenary in 2005. K. Ramachandra Rao, who was the headmaster of the London Mission High school in Bangalore, was one of the key persons responsible for the formation of Gayana Samaja. During the initial years, music concerts organised by the Gayana Samaja were held either at the Ekamabara Sauji Hall or at the hall of London Mission High school. During the early 1920s, the venue was changed to the old Sanskrit college building. The initial location of the Gayana Samaja was in a rented building in Chamarajapete.

In 1926, the Samaja was moved to Shankaraiah Hall, which was specifically built for the Gayana Samaja. In 1962 the organisation moved to its present location on K.R. Road. It was M.S. Subbulakshmi's personal contribution and funds collected out of her benefit concerts that increased the reserves enormously to see the building take shape. The present building housing the Gayana Samaja was built in various stages. The main auditorium and the stage were built as part of the first stage of construction. The front foyer, additional balcony in the auditorium and caretakers quarters were built in later stages. The auditorium has been recently renovated to improve the acoustics.

In 2016, the Bangalore Gayana Samaja building on K.R. Road was renovated and refurbished at a cost of ₹1.5 crore. The work was completed over a period of eight months and was officially inaugurated on 15 January 2017.

== Events ==
Bangalore Gayana Samaja has regular events such as the annual conference of members, musical demonstrations, lectures and concerts. Renowned musicians are honoured with the title Sangeeta Kalarathna during the annual conference. There is also a Composer's Day event to pay respects to renowned composers of Carnatic music.

== Publications ==
Gayana Samaja publishes a monthly journal, Gayana Samrajya, which contains reports of the organisation's various activities. A book on the history of the Gayana Samaja has also been published. The group is working on publishing a compendium of compositions of various composers of Indian classical music.
