= Vairamangalam Lakshmi Narayanan =

Vairamangalam LakshmiNarayanan (1928–2004) was a Carnatic musician from Tamil Nadu. He was a student of the famous singer T. K Rangachary.

LakshmiNarayanan was a versatile singer who could improvise and bring out the subtleties and nuances of ragas. He was capable of singing in very obscure ragas such as Nalinakanthi, Nayaki, Narayani, Natakapriya, Nagaswarali, Dharmavathi, Janaranjani, Andholika, etc.

== Awards ==
- LakshmiNarayanan received many awards for his talents.
- The Government of Tamil Nadu awarded his with the title Kalaimamani Award -2001, shortly before his death,

for his contributions of music.

- The Department of Culture of the Government of India conferred on him a Senior Fellowship in 2000, for his work on Divya Prabandhams.
