= Pattu Rajagopalan =

Pattu Rajagopalan is a former vocal artist of Carnatic music in All India Radio (AIR), Hyderabad and the Annamacharya Project of Tirumala-Tirupati Devasthanams (TTD) in Tirupati, Andhra Pradesh, India.

She was selected for AIR Hyderabad by Sangeetha Kalanidhis Musiri Subramania Iyer and Semmangudi Srinivasa Iyer in 1949. She had her initial training in Carnatic music in Hyderabad from Sri T.G. Padhmanaban (disciple of Alathur Venkatesa Iyer) and Sri P. Kuppuswamy (disciple of Karur Chinnaswamy Iyer), a well-known violinist of the yester years. She learned in the Alathur and Karur Chinnaswamy Iyer bani. Her Shruti and Laya are her forte. Then, she had her special training from Tirutani Krishnamurthy in Tirupati.

She was trained in Annamacharya keerthanas conducted by TTD Tirupati, between 1976 and 1978 and graduated with a diploma. She was trained by Padmasri Sangeetha Kalacharya Dr. S.R. Janakiraman, Vidwan Sri D. Pasupati, and Sangeetha Kalanidhi Sandhyavandanam Sreenivasa Rao.

Recommended by the Executive Officer of TTD Tirupati, Smt. Pattu Rajagopalan came to the U.S. and Canada in 1981 as the first ambassador of the Annamacharya Project. From 1981 to 1994, she toured the U.S. and Canada, performing over 50 concerts with a special emphasis on Annamacharya songs and the musical Trinity. This included three concerts at the Sri Venkateshwara Temple in Pittsburgh, during the annual Bhramothsavam (1981) and the 2nd Annamacharya Aradhana Day (1993).

She has performed over 1000 concerts, especially in the Annamacharya Project and the Dharma Prachara Parishad of TTD, Tirupati and Tirumala. She is running two institutions, Abhirama Bhakta Mandali and Shruti Laya School of Music in Tirupati. For the last 40 years, she has trained over 2000 students of all ages in India and 100 students in the U.S., in keerthanas, bhakti sangeetham, bhajans, Annamacharya songs, and slokas in many languages. Ten of her disciples are now performing vocal artists. She has been invited to judge in musical competitions conducted at Sri Venkateshwara College of Music and Dance, the Annamacharya Project, the Hare Rama Hare Krishna Institution, and various schools in Tirupati. Recently, she was invited to act as a judge at the Papanasam Sivan Music Competition conducted by the Sivan Fine Arts Academy, Chennai on 7–8 May 2011 in San Jose and Sunnyvale, CA, USA. Pooja Viswanath studied with her.

Her distinctions include, Best Teacher Award and the title 'Sangeetha Saraswati,' from Sri Venkateshwara Social and Cultural Organization, Tirupati. Of late, she has performed in the 'Nadha Neerajanam' program of TTD Tirupati on 3 October 2009 and the 1st Anniversary celebration of the same program on 15 August 2010 at Tirumala. She participated in the "Sahasragala Sankeerthanachana" conducted by Silicon Andhra during the Sri Tallapaka Annamacharya 603rd Jayanthi celebrations, at the Sunnyvale Hindu Temple, CA, USA on 12 May 2011. Thus, her musical career has spread over 60 years.

In the recent years, she has been honored by Swaralayam Arts Forum, in Houston, TX, including having an award in her name, presented to children showing promise in the field of music. The Pattu Rajagopalan Award was given to members of the Junior Division at the 2010 Clear Creek Independent School District Science Fair.
