= P. S. Narayanaswamy =

Carnatic music vocalist (1934–2020)

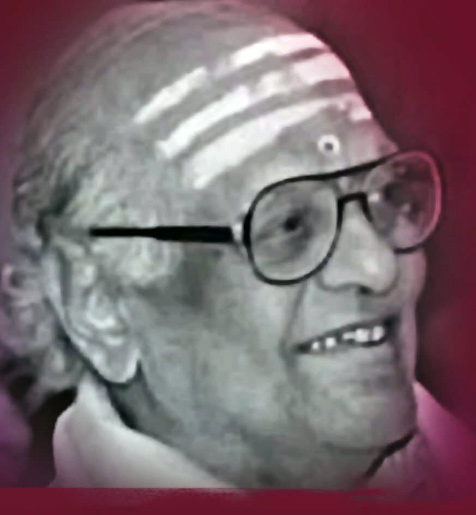
- P. S. Narayanaswamy

Background information
- Born: Puliyur Subramaniam Narayanaswamy; 24 February 1934; Konerirajapuram, British Raj
- Died: 16 October 2020 (aged 86)
- Genre: Carnatic music
- Occupation: Musician

Puliyur Subramaniam Narayanaswamy (or Narayanaswami; 24 February 1934 – 16 October 2020) was a Carnatic music vocalist.

== Career ==
Born during the British Raj, He learnt music from Tiruppambaram Somasundaram Pillai, T. M. Thiagarajan and later from Semmangudi Srinivasa Iyer. He was also a highly acclaimed teacher.

He was awarded the Bala Gana Kala Rathnam at the age of 12. He worked in All India Radio. In 1999, he was conferred the title Sangita Kala Acharya by the Music Academy. He was awarded Padma Bhushan by the Government of India in 2003. His well known disciples include (alphabetically) A. S. Murali, Akshay Padmanabhan, Abhishek Raghuram, Akkarai Sisters, Amritha Murali, Bharathi Ramasubban, C. R.Vaithyanathan, Gayathri Venkataraghavan, Kalavathy Avadhooth, Kunnakudi Balamuralikrishna, Nisha Rajagopalan, Ranjani-Gayatri sisters, Bharat Sundar, Sunil Gargeyan, Vishnudev K S, Janani Iyer, and Prithvi Harish

He died on 16 October 2020 due to old age.
