= 1925 Birthday Honours =

British government recognitions

The 1925 Birthday Honours were appointments by King George V to various orders and honours to reward and highlight good works by citizens of the British Empire. The appointments were made to celebrate the official birthday of The King, and were published in The London Gazette on 3 June 1925.

The recipients of honours are displayed here as they were styled before their new honour, and arranged by honour, with classes (Knight, Knight Grand Cross, etc.) and then divisions (Military, Civil, etc.) as appropriate,

== United Kingdom and British Empire ==
=== Viscount ===
- Marcus Samuel, Baron Bearsted

=== Privy Councillor ===
The King appointed the following to His Majesty's Most Honourable Privy Council:

- Colonel William Graham Nicholson JP DL MP Member of Parliament for the Petersfield Division since 1897. Chairman of the Selection Committee of the House of Commons and of the Chairman's Panel

=== Baronetcies ===
- Lieutenant-Colonel George Loyd Courthope MC TD JP DL MP Member of Parliament for the Rye Division of Sussex since 1906. For political and public services.
- Sir John Ritchie Findlay KBE JP DL Chairman of the Board of Trustees, for the National Gallery in Scotland. Former Master of the Merchant Company of Edinburgh. Chairman of Sick Children's Hospital, Edinburgh. For political and public services in Scotland.
- Hugo Hirst, Chairman of General Electric Company Limited. Member of Board of Trade Advisory Council
- Lieutenant-Colonel James Lithgow MC DL President of the National Confederation of Employers Organisations. British-Employers Delegate at the International Labour Conference at Geneva 1922-25
- Major Sir David Hughes-Morgan DL High Sheriff of Breconshire 1898–99. Has been several times Mayor of Tenby. For political and public services in Wales.
- Sir John Bland-Sutton FRGS President of the Royal College of Surgeons
- Wilfrid Forbes Home Thomson, For political and public services in Yorkshire.
- Major Granville Charles Hastings Wheler CBE DL MP Member of Parliament for Faversham Division since 1910. For political and public services.

=== Knight Bachelor ===
- Major-General Llewellyn William Atcherley CMG CVO H.M. Inspector of Constabulary
- Major Richard Whieldon Barnett MP Member of Parliament for West St. Pancras, October 1916–18, and for S.W. St. Pancras since 1918. For political and public services.
- James Berry FRCS Consulting Surgeon to the Royal Free Hospital. Member of the Council of the Royal College of Surgeons of England. Chief authority on goitre in this country.
- Herbert Edwin Blain CBE Principal Agent of the Conservative and Unionist Party since 1924. Late Assistant Managing Director of the London Underground Railways and the London General Omnibus Company Group For political and public services.
- William James Miller Burton. For public, services in connection with the new site and building of Lloyds. Managing Director of the City of London Real Property Co. Ltd.
- John Byford DL For political and public services in West Ham. Former Mayor of West Ham
- Harry Edward Dixey JP DL Chairman and Honorary Secretary of the Bewdley and West Worcestershire Unionist Association for 25 years. For political and public services.
- David William Evans, Director and Legal Adviser of the Welsh National Memorial Association. For public services.
- in Wales
- Alderman John William Forrest OBE Member of Blackburn Town Council since 1913. Alderman 1921. Leader of the Council since 1916. Chairman of the Finance Committee and of the Education Committee. For political and public services.
- Major Ernest Gray Member of Parliament for West Ham (North) 1895-1906 for Accrington 1918–1922, Member of the London County Council since 1907, of which he was Vice-Chairman in 1915. Formerly President of the National Union of Teachers. For political and public services.
- Herbert Hamilton Harty, Composer; Conductor of the Hallé Orchestra
- Herbert James Hope, Senior Registrar, Bankruptcy and Companies Winding-up Department
- Travers Humphreys, Senior Prosecuting Counsel for the Treasury
- John Herbert Hunter Chairman of the London County Council, of which he has been a member since 1907. Chairman of the North Paddington Conservative Association since 1907. For political and public services.
- Barry Vincent Jackson, Manager of the Birmingham Repertory Theatre
- Alderman Percy Richard Jackson, Chairman of Education Committee of West Riding of Yorkshire. For honorary services to education.
- John William Lorden DL Member of Parliament for North St. Pancras 1918–23. Member of Wandsworth Borough Council for 21 years, Mayor 1903-4 and 1907–8. Chairman of Committees on Stone, Brick and Clay Ware Trades and on Timber set up in 1920-21 under the Profiteering Act. For political and public services.
- William John Morcom DL For political and public services in Surrey
- George Herbert Oatley, Architect of Bristol University. For public services.
- Bernard Partridge, Artist
- John Robertson CMG OBE Medical Officer of Health, Birmingham. Professor of Public Health in Birmingham University
- Jonah Walker-Smith, Director of Housing, Ministry of Health
- Philip Colville Smith CVO Grand Secretary of the United Grand Lodge of English Freemasons
- Thomas Taylor, For political and public services in Macclesfield.
- Alderman Illtyd Thomas DL Former Lord Mayor of Cardiff. Original Member of the Court of Governors and of the Council of the National Museum of Wales. Honorary Treasurer since 1917. For political and public services in Wales.

British India

- Clement Daniel Maggs Hindley VD Chief Commissioner for Railways
- Chunilal Vijbhukhandas Mehta, Member of the Executive Council, Bombay
- Major-General William Bernard James CB CIE MVO Director of Remounts
- Selwyn Howe Fremantle CSI CIE VD Member, Board of Revenue, United Provinces
- James MacKenna CIE Indian Civil Service, Additional Financial Commissioner, Burma
- John Hope Simpson CIE Indian Civil Service (retired), late Chairman, Colonies Committee
- Rajamantra Dhurina Albion Rajkumar Banerji CSI CIE Indian Civil Service (retired), Dewan and President in Council, Mysore
- Lieutenant-Colonel William Frederick Travers O'Connor CSI CIE CVO late British Envoy at the Court of Nepal
- Lieutenant-Colonel Robert William Layard Dunlop CIE DSO Solicitor to the Government of India
- Diwan Bahadur Rajasabhabhusana Krishnarajapuram Pallegondai Puttanna Chetty CIE Member of the Legislative Council, Mysore, Mysore Civil Service (retired)
- Raja Venganad Vasudeva Raja Avargal, Valiya Nambidi CIE of Kollengode, Landholder, Malabar, Madras
- Leslie Sewell Hudson, Member of the Legislative Council, Bombay, Partner in firm of Messrs. Mackinnon, Mackenzie & Co., President, Bombay Chamber of Commerce, and Member of Bombay Port Trust
- Hubert Winch Carr, Partner, Balmer, Lawrie & Co., President, European Association, Bengal
- Charles Ross Alston, Barrister-at-Law, Allahabad, United Provinces
- Vasantrao Anandrao Dabholkar CBE Member of the Legislative Council, Bombay, Landowner, Bombay
- D'Arcy Lindsay CBE Member, Legislative Assembly
- John Campbell CSI OBE Indian Civil Service (retired), Representative of the Government of India on the League of Nations Opium Advisory Committee

Colonies, Protectorates, etc.

- Aaron Turner Banks, President of the Melbourne Hospital, State of Victoria
- The Hon. John Henry Hosking KC lately Judge of the Supreme Court of New Zealand
- Joseph Clifton Love, lately President of the Associated Chambers of Manufactures of the Australian Chamber of Commerce, Commonwealth of Australia, in recognition of his services to the Commonwealth
- Lieutenant-Colonel Harry Claude Moorhouse CMG DSO Lieutenant-Governor of the Southern Provinces of Nigeria
- James Peiris, Vice-President of the Legislative Council of Ceylon
- Archibald Thomas Strong, formerly Professor of Classics and Lecturer in English at Melbourne University, and Chief Government Censor of Cinematograph Films, Commonwealth of Australia
- George O'Donnell Walton, Chief Justice of Grenada

=== The Most Honourable Order of the Bath ===
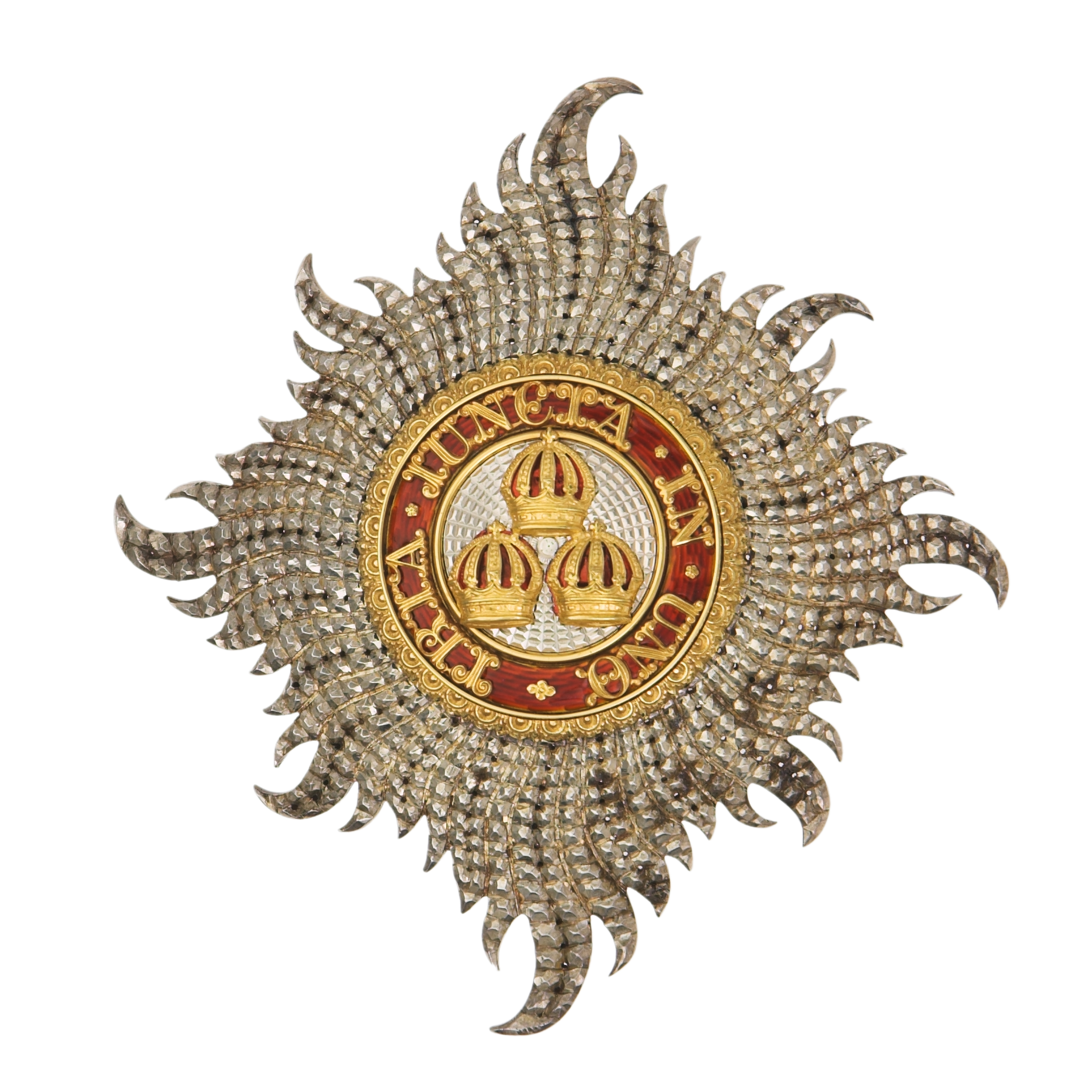
Civilian star of the Knight Grand Cross of the Order of the Bath

==== Knight Grand Cross of the Order of the Bath (GCB) ====
===== Military Division =====
Royal Navy

- Admiral Sir William Christopher Pakenham KCB KCMG KCVO

==== Knight Commander of the Order of the Bath (KCB) ====
===== Military Division =====
Royal Navy

- Vice-Admiral Sir James Andrew Fergusson KCMG CB
- Vice-Admiral Michael Henry Hodges CB CMG MVO

Army

- Major-General Sir Hew Dalrymple Fanshawe KCMG CB Colonel, The Queen's Bays (2nd Dragoon Guards)
- Major-General Samuel Guise-Moores CB CMG late Royal Army Medical Corps,
- Major-General Charles William Grant Richardson CB CSI Indian Army, General Officer Commanding, Poona District, India

===== Civil Division =====
- The Right Reverend Bishop John Taylor Smith CB CVO late Chaplain-General to the Forces

==== Companion of the Order of the Bath (CB) ====
===== Military Division =====
Royal Navy

- Surgeon Rear-Admiral Alexander Maclean DSO
- Engineer Rear-Admiral Herbert Brooks Moorshead CBE
- Captain the Hon. Herbert Meade CVO DSO ADC RN
- Captain Joseph Charles Walrond Henley RN
- Colonel Joseph Arthur Myles Ariel Clark CMG RM
- Captain William Marshall DSO RD RNR

Army

- Major General Claude Douglas Hamilton Moore CMG DSO Half-Pay List
- Colonel George Walker CBE DSO Chief Engineer, Eastern Command
- Colonel Arthur Mudge CMG Inspector of the West Indian Local Forces, and Officer Commanding the Troops, Jamaica
- Colonel Harry George Burrard CSI DSO ADC Assistant Director of Supplies and Transport, Egypt
- Colonel Barnett Dyer Lempriere Gray Anley CMG DSO Commandant, Senior Officers School, Sheerness
- Colonel Philip Lancelot Holbrooke CMG DSO ADC Colonel Royal Artillery, Attached to the Staff, Headquarters, Scottish Command
- Colonel Hubert Jervoise Huddleston CMG DSO MC General Officer Commanding, Sudan
- Major-General Henry Edward ap Rhys Pryce CMG DSO Indian Army, Director of Supplies and Transport, India
- Colonel Herbert William Jackson CSI DSO Indian Army, Area Commandant, Bangalore Brigade Area, India
- Colonel Patrick Henry Dundas CBE DSO Indian Army, Brigade Commander, 18th Indian Infantry Brigade, India

===== Civil Division =====
- Charles Frederick Munday, Deputy Director of Naval Construction, Admiralty
- Colonel Harry Dalton Henderson DSO VD TD Territorial Army, Honorary Colonel, 51st (Highland) Divisional Train, Royal Army Service Corps, Territorial Army
- Group Captain John Adrian Chamier CMG DSO OBE RAF
- Horace Christian Dawkins MBE Clerk Assistant of the House of Commons
- Francis Netherwood Dixon, Secretary, Exchequer and Audit Department
- Edward Vandermere Fleming, Director of Establishments, War Office
- John Duncan Gregory CMG Assistant Under Secretary of State, Foreign Office
- Percy Jesse Gowlett Rose, Assistant Under Secretary for Scotland
- Frederick William Leith-Ross, Deputy Controller of Finance, Treasury. Until recently British Member of Finance Board of Reparations Commission
- Charles Gordon Spry, Commissioner and Joint Secretary, Board of Inland Revenue
- Sylvanus Percival Vivian, Registrar General
- Humbert Wolfe CBE Principal Assistant Secretary, Ministry of Labour

=== The Most Exalted Order of the Star of India ===
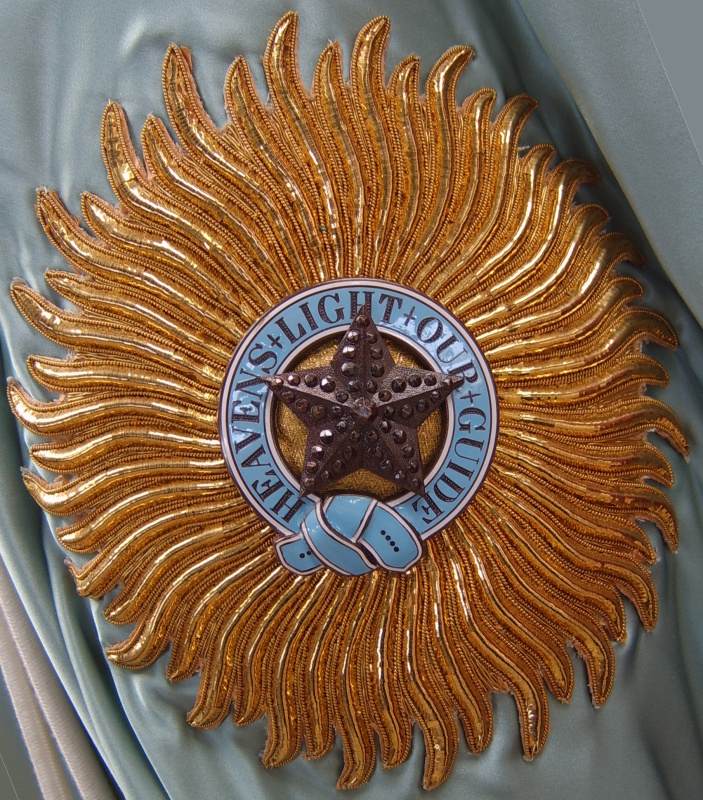
Star of a Knight Grand Commander of the Most Exalted Order of the Star of India

==== Knight Grand Commander (GCSI) ====
- The Rt. Hon. Victor Alexander George Robert, Earl of Lytton GCIE Viceroy and Acting Governor-General of India

==== Knight Commander (KCSI) ====
- Major His Highness Raj Rajeshwar Maharajadhiraja Umaid Singh Bahadur KCVO Maharaja of Jodhpur, Rajputana
- Sir Alexander Frederick Whyte, President, Legislative Assembly
- Sir Maurice Henry Weston Hayward, Indian Civil Service, Member of the Executive Council, Bombay
- Sir Abdur Rahim, Member of the Executive Council, Bengal

==== Companion (CSI) ====
- Major-General Thomas Henry Symons OBE Indian Medical Service, Honorary Surgeon to His Majesty the King, Surgeon-General with the Government of Madras
- Frederick Lewisohn CBE Indian Civil Service, Chief Secretary to the Government of Burma
- William Peter Sangster CIE Chief Engineer, Irrigation Branch, Public Works Department, Punjab

=== The Most Distinguished Order of Saint Michael and Saint George ===
Star of the Order of Saint Michael and Saint George.

==== Knight Grand Cross of the Order of St Michael and St George (GCMG) ====
- The Rt. Hon. Sir John Lawrence Baird Bt CMG DSO Governor-General and Commander-in-Chief designate of the Commonwealth of Australia
- Sir William George Tyrrell KCMG KCVO CB Permanent Under Secretary of State, Foreign Office

==== Knight Commander of the Order of St Michael and St George (KCMG) ====
- Sir Charles Calvert Bowring KBE CMG Governor and Commander-in-Chief, Nyasaland Protectorate
- Sir Henry Robert Conway Dobbs KCSI KCIE High Commissioner and Commander-in-Chief, Iraq
- Colonel Gerald Henry Summers CMG Governor and Commander-in-Chief, Somaliland Protectorate
- The Hon. Sir Robert Furse McMillan Kt Lieutenant-Governor and Chief Justice of the Supreme Court, State of Western Australia
- Sir Alexander Wood Renton Kt KC formerly Chief Justice of the Island of Ceylon; Chairman, Compensation (Ireland) Commission
- John Charles Tudor Vaughan CMG MVO His Majesty's Envoy Extraordinary and Minister Plenipotentiary to the Republics of Estonia, Latvia, and Lithuania
- Sir Percy Lyham Loraine Bt CMG His Majesty's Envoy Extraordinary and Minister Plenipotentiary to His Majesty the Shah of Persia

==== Companion of the Order of St Michael and St George (CMG) ====
- Edward Bruce Alexander, Controller of Revenue, Ceylon
- Frank Morrish Baddeley, Chief Secretary to the Government of Nigeria, lately Under Secretary, Straits Settlements
- Albert Cecil Day CBE Official Secretary to the Governor-General, Dominion of New Zealand
- Jules Ellenberger ISO Resident Commissioner, Bechuanaland Protectorate
- Reginald Clifton Grannum, Treasurer, Colony of Kenya
- The Most Reverend Edward Hutson Bishop of Antigua and Archbishop of the Province of the West Indies, Chairman of the Central Relief Committee in the Leeward Islands after the recent hurricane
- William McIver, Director of Land Settlement, Secretary for Lands, Chairman of Closer Settlement Board and Member of Board of Land and Works, State of Victoria
- John Henry Starling OBE Official Secretary to the Governor-General and Secretary of the Federal Executive Council, Commonwealth of Australia
- Oswald Francis Gerard Stonor, British Resident, Selangor, Federated Malay States
- Charles John Howell Thomas, Chief Valuer, Board of Inland Revenue; for services as Member of the Compensation (Ireland) Commission
- Ernest Frederick Gye, Counsellor in the Foreign Office
- John Murray, Counsellor in the Foreign Office
- John Joyce Broderick, Commercial Counsellor at His Majesty's Embassy at Washington
- Arthur Andrew Morrison CM British Delegate on the International Maritime Sanitary and Quarantine Board of Egypt
- Godfrey Thomas Havard, Oriental Secretary to his Majesty's Legation at Tehran

Honorary Companions

- Raja Chulan ibni Sultan Abdullah, the Rajadi-Hilir of Perak, Federated Malay States
- Khan Bahadur Sayed Hussain bin Hamid al Mehdar, Chief Minister of the Kaiti Sultans of Mokalla, Aden Protectorate

=== The Most Eminent Order of the Indian Empire ===
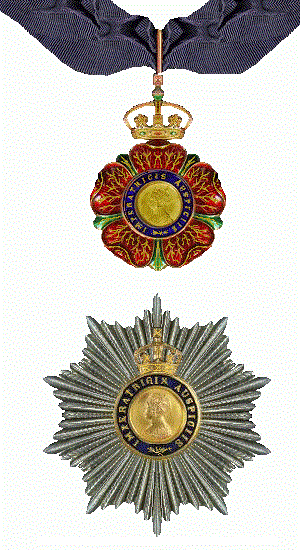
Riband, badge and star of the Knight Grand Commander of the Order of the Indian Empire

==== Knight Commander (KCIE) ====
- Chetput Pattabhirama Ayyar Ramaswami Ayyar Avargal CIE Member of the Executive Council, Madras
- Samuel Perry O'Donnell CSI CIE Indian Civil Service, Member of the Executive Council, United Provinces
- Bertram Prior Standen CSI CIE Indian Civil Service, Member of the Executive Council, Central Provinces
- Denys de Saumarez Bray CSI CIE CBE Foreign Secretary to the Government of India

==== Companion (CIE) ====
- Rao Bahadur Dhau Bakshi Raghubir Singh, President, Bharatpur State Council, Rajputana
- Khan Bahadur Kaus Rustomji, Finance and Home Member, State Council, Bikaner, Rajputana
- Lieutenant-Colonel Roger Parker Wilson, Indian Medical Service, Officiating Surgeon-General to the Government of Bengal
- George Arthur Thomas, Indian Civil Service, Secretary to the Government of Bombay, Revenue Department
- Henry Tireman, Chief Conservator of Forests, Madras
- Arthur Durham Ashdown, Inspector-General of Police, United Provinces
- Thomas Henry Morony, Inspector-General of Police, Central Provinces
- Cyril Walter Lloyd Jones, Agent and Chief Engineer, His Exalted Highness the Nizam's Guaranteed State Railways Company, Hyderabad, Deccan
- Henry Arthur Crouch, Consulting Architect to the Government of Bengal
- William Gaskell, Indian Civil Service, Income-Tax Commissioner and Opium Agent, United Provinces
- Douglas Gordon Harris, Deputy Secretary to the Government of India, Department of Industries and Labour
- Lieutenant-Colonel Clayton Alexander Francis Hingston OBE Indian Medical Service, Superintendent, Government Hospital for Women and Children, Madras
- Raymond Patrick Hadow, Superintending Engineer, Irrigation Branch, Public Works Department, Punjab
- Lieutenant-Colonel Walter Dorling Smiles DSO Member of the Legislative Council, Assam, General Manager, Moran Tea Company
- Joseph Miles Clay OBE Indian Civil Service, Magistrate and Collector, United Provinces
- Major John Aloysius Brett, Political Agent, Khyber, North-West Frontier Province
- Major Henry Bundle Lawrence, Political Agent, Haraoti and Tonk, Bajputana
- Archibald Morven MacMillan, Indian Civil Service, Collector and District Magistrate and Political Agent, Surat, Bombay
- Khan Bahadur Qazi Aziz-ud-Din Ahmad OBE ISO late Deputy Collector, United Provinces, Diwan of Datia State, Central India
- Oscar de Glanville OBE Member of the Legislative Council, Burma, Governing Director, Rangoon Daily News
- Khan Bahadur Nawabzada Sayyid Ashraf-ud-Din Ahmad, Member of the Legislative Council, Bihar and Orissa, Vice-President, Provincial Haj Committee
- Khan Bahadur Behramji Hormasji Nanavati, Medical Practitioner, Ahmedabad, Bombay
- Surendra Nath Mullick, Pleader, Alipore Court, Bengal

=== The Royal Victorian Order ===
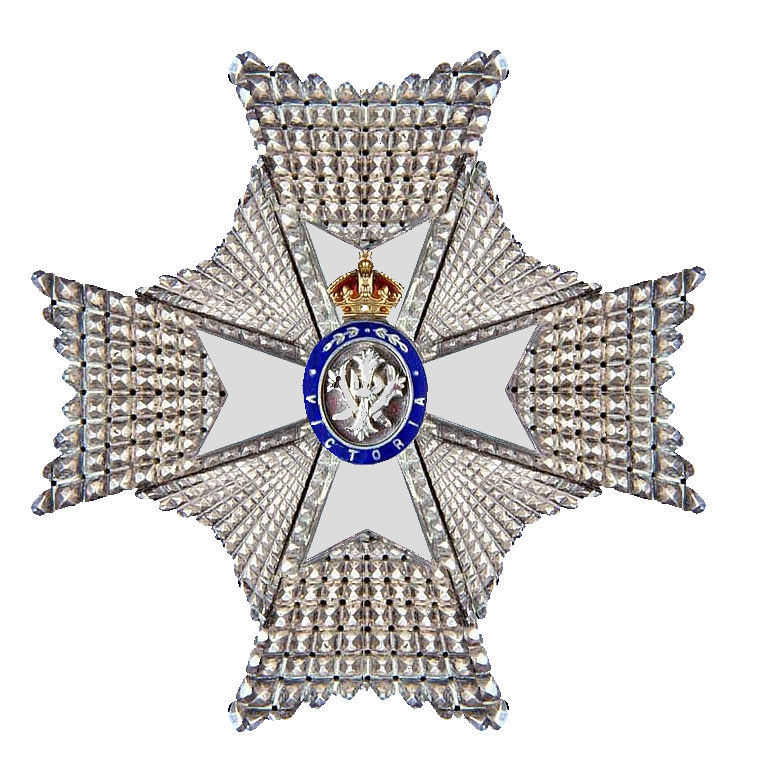
Insignia of a Knight / Dames Commander of the Royal Victorian Order

==== Knight Grand Cross of the Royal Victorian Order (GCVO) ====
- Hugh Cecil, Earl of Lonsdale
- William Henry, Baron Desborough KCVO

==== Knight Commander of the Royal Victorian Order (KCVO) ====
- The Right Rev. Hubert Murray Burge, Lord Bishop of Oxford
- Bernard Edward Halsey Bircham
- Joseph Henry Greer

==== Commander of the Royal Victorian Order (CVO) ====
- Major the Hon. Richard Frederick Molyneux MVO
- Colonel St. John Corbet Gore CB CBE
- Colonel Bernard William Lynedoch McMahon CMG

==== Member of the Royal Victorian Order, 4th class (MVO) ====
- Captain the Hon. Alexander Henry Louis Hardinge MC
- Lieutenant-Commander Ronald George Bowes-Lyon RN (dated 16 February 1925)
- Captain Albert John Robertson RN
- Major Trevor Newall Watson MC

==== Member of the Royal Victorian Order, 5th class (MVO) ====
- The Reverend Albert Lee Richard Marsh

=== The Most Excellent Order of the British Empire ===
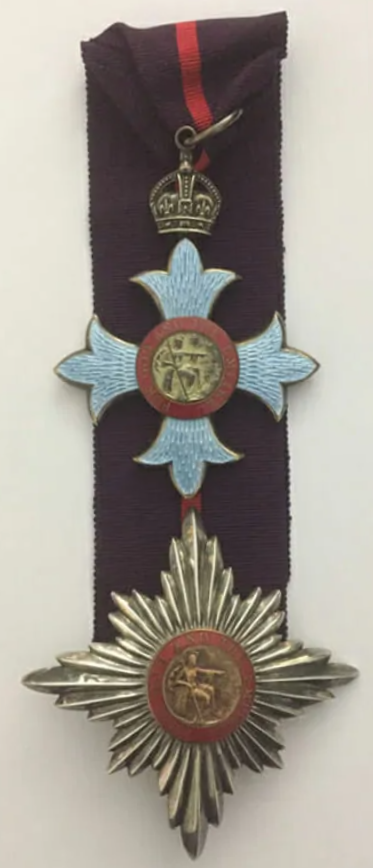
Knight Commander of the Order of the British Empire, insignia 1917–35

==== Knight Grand Cross of the Order of the British Empire (GBE) ====
===== Civil Division =====
- Major-General Herbert Francis Eaton, Baron Cheylesmore KCMG KCVO Chairman of the National Rifle Association; President of the Lord Roberts Memorial Workshops. Twice Mayor of Westminster and Chairman of London County Council 1912-13
- Sir Frederic George Kenyon KCB TD Director and Principal Librarian of the British Museum
- Sir John Francis Cleverton Snell MInstCE Chairman of the Electricity Commission

Colonies, Protectorates, etc.

- Sir Hugh Charles Clifford GCMG Governor and Commander-in-Chief of the Colony and Protectorate of Nigeria, Governor and Commander-in-Chief designate of the Island of Ceylon

==== Dame Commander of the Order of the British Empire (DBE) ====
- Marie-Louise Emma Cécile Gye (Madame Albani)
- Susan Mary Elizabeth, Lady St. Helier CBE JP a Member of the London County Council for 15 years, has taken an active part in social and philanthropic work. For public services.
- Louisa Innes Lumsden late Headmistress of St. Leonards School for Girls and First Warden of University Hall for Women, St. Andrews
- Anne Beadsmore Smith CBE RRC Matron-in-Chief, Queen Alexandra's Imperial Military Nursing Service, 1919–24
- Mary Monica Cunliffe Wills, Lady of Grace of the Order of St. John of Jerusalem. For public services.

Colonies, Protectorates, etc.

- Mary, Lady Cook. In recognition of her services in connection with visitors to London from the Commonwealth of Australia.

==== Knight Commander of the Order of the British Empire (KBE) ====
===== Military Division =====
Royal Navy

- Vice-Admiral Frederick Charles Learmonth CB CBE

Army

- Major-General George Norton Cory CB DSO Deputy Chief of the General Staff, Army Headquarters, India
- Major-General Cecil Francis Romer CB CMG Director of Staff Duties, War Office

Royal Air Force

- Air Vice-Marshal John Frederick Andrews Higgins CB DSO AFC RAF

===== Civil Division =====
- Edward Hall Alderson CB Clerk Assistant of Parliaments
- Major Robert Lister Bower CMG OBE Chief Constable of North Riding of Yorkshire
- Edmund Kerchever Chambers CB FBA Second Secretary, Board of Education
- Colonel Charles Clifford CMG VD TD DL For political and public services in Sheffield
- John Smith Flett OBE Director of Geological Survey of Great Britain and Museum of Practical Geology
- Charles Leolin Forestier-Walker MP Knight of Grace of the Order of St. John of Jerusalem. For political and public services. Member of Parliament for Monmouth. since 1918. Chairman of Monmouthshire County Council 1923–24. A Forestry Commissioner (unpaid). A Commissioner of the Board of Control (unpaid). A Welsh Church Commissioner (unpaid)
- Frederick Thomas Hopkinson MInstCE For services in connection with the Nile Dam, Sudan
- Charles Fraser Adair Hore CB Principal Assistant Secretary, Ministry of Pensions
- Francis Adolphus Jones CB Legal Adviser, Ministry of Agriculture and Fisheries and Solicitor to Commissioners of Crown Lands
- Frederick Sydney Parry CB Deputy Chairman, Board of Customs and Excise
- Henry Arthur Payne CB Second Secretary, Board of Trade
- Sir John Reid JP DL Director of Glasgow Chamber of Commerce, Director of Glasgow Infirmary, Vice-President of the Princess Louise Scottish Hospital for Limbless Sailors and Soldiers, President of the Glasgow YMCA For political and public services.
- John Lloyd Vaughan Seymour Williams TD, Lieutenant-Colonel Royal Engineers (T.A.), retired. Clerk to the Rural District Council of Warmley for over 20 years; Chairman of Executive, Rural District Councils Association for over 25 years

Diplomatic Service and Overseas List

- Robert MacLeod Hodgson CMG His Majesty's Chargé d'Affaires at Moscow
- Thomas Harold Lyle CMG His Majesty's Consul-General at Bangkok
- Andrew Ryan CMG His Majesty's Consul-General at Rabat, Morocco

British India

- John Arnold Wallinger CIE DSO Indian Police

Colonies, Protectorates, etc.

- Colonel Herbert Bryan CMG DSO Colonial Secretary and Revenue Commissioner, Island of Jamaica
- James Alexander Mackenzie Elder, Commissioner for the Commonwealth of Australia in the United States of America
- James Crawford Maxwell CMG Colonial Secretary, Gold Coast Colony
- Professor William Harrison Moore CMG Professor of Law, Melbourne University, Commonwealth of Australia
- Major-General George Spafford Richardson CB CMG CBE Administrator of Western Samoa

==== Commander of the Order of the British Empire (CBE) ====
===== Military Division =====
Royal Navy

- Engineer Captain Cecil Henry Alec Bermingham RN
- Paymaster Captain Edgar Bocquet Swan RN
- Captain Courtenay Charles Evan, Baron Tredegar OBE VD RNVR

Army

- Lieutenant-Colonel and Brevet Colonel Ernest Robinson OBE TD Tyne Electrical Engineers, Territorial Army
- Major Francis David Alexander, Inspector of Remounts
- Colonel William Henniker Anderson, Indian Army
- Major and Brevet Lieutenant-Colonel Charles Reginald Barke TD 5th Battalion, The North Staffordshire Regiment, Territorial Army, Commanding 3rd Battalion, Iraq Levies
- Colonel James Molesworth Blair CMG DSO late Military Attache, Belgrade
- Major and Brevet Lieutenant-Colonel Herbert Thomas Dobbin DSO The Duke of Cornwall's Light Infantry, Commandant, Iraq Levies
- Colonel John Cavendish Freeland, Indian Army
- Lieutenant-Colonel Claude Henry Haig DSO 2nd Battalion, The Leicestershire Regiment
- Florence May Hodgins RRC Matron-in-Chief, Queen Alexandra's Imperial Military Nursing Service
- Lieutenant-Colonel George Elliot Llewhellin VD Bihar Light Horse, Auxiliary Force, India
- Lieutenant-Colonel William Hew McCowan DSO Regular Army Reserve of Officers, Cameron Highlanders, Officer Commanding Khartoum District
- Colonel John Galloway Riddick DSO TD 42nd Divisional Royal Engineers, Territorial Army

Royal Air Force

- Wing Commander Augustine ap Ellis RAF

===== Civil Division =====
- Thomas Martland Ainscough OBE H.M. Senior Trade Commissioner in India and Ceylon
- Lieutenant-Colonel the Hon. George Augustus Anson MVO DL Chief Constable of Staffordshire
- Thomas James Arnold, Principal Private Secretary to Minister of Pensions
- George Edwin Baker, Assistant Secretary, Mercantile Marine Department, Board of Trade
- George Paddock Bate FRCSE DL For services to the Home Office under the Factory Acts
- William Freshfield Burnett, Registrar, HM Land Registry
- Francis Carnegie OBE MInstCE Chief Mechanical Engineer and Superintendent, Building Works Department, Royal Arsenal
- Lieutenant-Colonel John Fillis Carré Carter, Deputy Assistant Commissioner, Metropolitan Police
- David Mackay Cassidy FRCS Medical Superintendent, Lancaster Mental Hospital
- The Hon. Stephen Ogle Henn Collins, Legal Adviser to the Admiralty on War Compensation Cases
- Essie Ruth Conway Principal, Tiber Street Council School, Liverpool. Member of Consultative Committee of Board of Education
- Commissioner Adelaide Cox, Commissioner in the Salvation Army
- James William Curry OBE late Controller of Supplies, Office of Works
- Colonel Ivor Curtis Educational Adviser, Air Ministry
- Mary Elizabeth Davies RRC Matron-in-chief, Ministry of Pensions, Nursing Service
- William Augustus Bulkeley-Evans OBE For services to the Ministry of Labour
- Samuel George Forsythe JP Postmaster-Surveyor of Glasgow
- Henry Genochio, Senior Deputy Chief Inspector, Board of Customs and Excise
- Lieutenant Commander Oscar Henderson DSO RN (retired), Private Secretary to His Grace the Governor of Northern Ireland
- Maxwell Hyslop Maxwell VD JP DL Chairman of Watch Committee, Liverpool
- Ernest Alfred John Pearce OBE Director of Warship Production, Royal Corps of Naval Constructors, Admiralty
- Seward Pearce, Assistant Director of Public Prosecutions
- Councillor Margaret Evelyn Pilkington JP President of St. Helen's Women's Unionist Association, Member of St Helens Council. For political and public services.
- Ellen Frances Hume Pinsent, Commissioner, Board of Control
- Godfrey Rotter OBE Director of Explosives Research, War Office
- William George Verdon Smith, Chairman of Bristol Local Employment Committee
- John, Lord Wodehouse MC DL For public services.
- Andrew Nicholas Bonaparte-Wyse, Assistant Secretary, Ministry of Education, Northern Ireland
- Francis Watson Young, formerly one of H.M. Inspectors of Schools in Scotland. For public services.

British India

- Lieutenant-Colonel Alfred Beckett Minchin CIE late Agent to the Governor-General, Punjab States
- Lieutenant-Colonel Charles Edward Bruce CIE OBE Deputy Commissioner, Dera Ismail Khan, North-West Frontier Province
- Duncan John Sloss, Principal, University College, Rangoon, Burma
- Major Alexander James Hutchison Russell, Indian Medical Service, Director of Public Health, Madras

Diplomatic Service and Overseas List

- Austen Alexander Rodney Boyce, Head of Survey Department, Sudan Government
- Charles Edward Hardley Childers, His Majesty's Consul at Pittsburg
- John Gadsby, Legal Adviser to His Majesty's Embassy at Tokyo
- Lieutenant-Colonel George Douglas Gray, Doctor at His Majesty's Legation at Peking
- Thomas Lavington Jacks, Joint Manager of the Anglo-Persian Oil Company
- William Kidston McClure

Colonies, Protectorates, etc.

- George Drysdale Bayley, Commissioner of Lands and Mines, Colony of British Guiana
- Richard Hind Cambage, Honorary Secretary to the Australian National Research Council, Commonwealth of Australia
- Massimiliano Debono President of the Senate and President of the Chamber of Advocates, Island of Malta
- Edgard Lucien de Chazal Superintendent, Victoria Hospital, Mauritius
- The Reverend Alexander Hetherwick Head of the Church of Scotland Mission, Nyasaland Protectorate, and Member of the Legislative Council of the Protectorate
- John Lisseter Humphreys, British Adviser, Trengganu, Malay States
- David Sliman MacGregor, Treasurer and Custodian of Enemy Property, Nigeria
- Colonel Angus John McNeill CB DSO Commandant, British Section, Palestine Gendarmerie
- Clive McPherson, has acted as Honorary Adviser to the Government of the Commonwealth of Australia in the organization of primary industries
- John Pears Murray, Deputy Resident Commissioner, Basutoland
- Victor Richard Ratten Surgeon Superintendent, Hobart Public Hospital, State of Tasmania
- Frank Arthur Stockdale, Director of Agriculture, Ceylon
- Allan Wilkie, Actor-Manager and producer of Shakespeare's Plays in the Commonwealth of Australia

Honorary Commanders

- Haji Nik Mahmud bin Haji Ismail, the Datok Perdana Meaitri Paduka Raja of Kelantan, Malay States
- Plaji Ngah Muhammad bin Yusuf, Datok Sri Amar Diraja, President of the State Council, Trengganu, Malay States

==== Officer of the Order of the British Empire (OBE) ====
===== Military Division =====
Royal Navy

- Commander Edward Bernard Cornish Dicken DSC RN
- Commander Robert Lindsay Burnett RN
- Surgeon Commander John Scarbrough Dudding RN
- Paymaster Commander Robert Alfred Jinkin RN Instructor
- Lieutenant-Commander Arthur Edward Hall ARCS RN
- Major Frederick William Mattison RM

Army

- Temp. Inspector of Works and Captain William Barrie AMInstCE Staff for Royal Engineer Services
- Major Darell St. John Baxter, 3/8th Punjab Regiment, Indian Army
- Lieutenant-Colonel Gerald Beach TD 9th Battalion, The Middlesex Regiment, Territorial Army
- Major and Brevet Lieutenant-Colonel Maxwell Spieker Brander AMIMechE Royal Army Service Corps
- Major and Brevet Lieutenant-Colonel Richard Bolger Butler MC 8th King George's Own Light Cavalry, Indian Army
- Lieutenant-Colonel Joseph Coates, Oudh and Rohilkhand Railway Battalion, Auxiliary Force, India
- Major Thomas Herbert Darwell MC Royal Tank Corps
- Lieutenant-Colonel The Hon. John Dewar MC TD 6/7th Battalion, The Black Watch, Territorial Army
- Major George Melville Duncan TD 8th Battalion, The Argyll and Sutherland Highlanders, Territorial Army
- Lieutenant-Colonel Frank Ninum Falkner TD 56th (1st London) Divisional Train, Royal Army Service Corps, Territorial Army
- Major D'Arcy John Francis, 23rd (London) Armoured Car Company, Territorial Army
- Lieutenant (Temp. Major) Ernest Edward Gawthorn DCM Postal Section, Royal Engineers
- Major Cecil Courtney Godwin, The Green Howards
- Major Harold James Huxford, 5th/6th Rajputana Rifles (Napiers), Indian Army
- Captain Charles Norman Jervelund, The Green Howards
- Major Edgar Montague Jones TD St. Alban's School Contingent, Officers Training Corps, General List, Territorial Army. Ordnance Executive Officer, 1st Class, and Major John Henry Keyes MC Royal Army Ordnance Corps
- Staff Paymaster and Lieutenant-Colonel William Shand Mackenzie, Royal Army Pay Corps
- Major Thomas Moss, 16th Punjab Regiment, Indian Army
- Major and Brevet Lieutenant-Colonel David Ogilvy DSO Royal Engineers
- Accountant Officer, 2nd Class, and Lieutenant-Colonel Vernon Ivor Robins, Corps of Military Accountants
- Quartermaster and Major Albert Edward Robinson MC Senior Officers School, Sheerness
- Major John Scott DSO Indian Medical Service
- Captain John Teague MC 1st/10th Baluch Regiment, Indian Army
- Quartermaster and Major Jabez Teece MC 1st Battalion, Grenadier Guards
- Quartermaster and Lieutenant-Colonel Frederick Walker, Recruiting Duties, Edinburgh
- Major James Walker DSO TD 26th (East Riding of Yorkshire) Armoured Car Company, Territorial Army
- Major John Percival Ward MC TD 2nd, (Cheshire) Field Squadron, Royal Engineers, Territorial Army
- Senior Nursing Sister Mary Wardell ARRC Queen Alexandra's Military Nursing Service for India
- Quartermaster and Major Frederick Henry White DCM Recruiting Duties, Wolverhampton

Royal Air Force

- Squadron Leader Norman Channing Spratt
- Flight Lieutenant Albert William Fletcher DFC AFC
- Flight Lieutenant Norman Hugh Jenkins DFC DSM

===== Civil Division =====
- Walter Abbott, Principal Officer, Ministry of Commerce, Northern Ireland
- Albert Edward Adcock, Chairman of Deptford Local Employment Committee
- William Anderson, Chief Constable, City of Aberdeen Police Force
- Lieutenant-Colonel Sydney Ashley VD Superintendent Registrar, St. Giles District
- Councillor Henrietta Bartleet JP Member of Birmingham City Council. For public services.
- James Billings, Chief Constable, Metropolitan Police
- James Gressier Blackledge JP Chairman of Bootle Advisory Committee since 1918
- John Joseph Bonnett, Chairman, South Middlesex, Slough and District War Pensions Committee
- Arthur Brandram, Secretary, United Services Trustee
- Captain John Turner Brinkley, Chief Constable of Warwickshire
- William Allison Davies, Borough Treasurer of Preston. For valuable services in the work of Local Government
- Frederic William Charles Dean MBE Superintendent, Royal Gun and Carriage Factories, Woolwich Arsenal
- George Elmhirst Duckering, Inspector of Factories, Home Office. Director of Government Wool Disinfecting Station
- Charles John Ffoulkes, Curator of Armouries, H.M. Tower of London, Curator and Secretary, Imperial War Museum
- Joseph Wilson Fogarty MBE Temporary Assistant in Shipping Liquidation Department
- Frederick William Prosser French, Principal Clerk, Board of Inland Revenue
- Major Cedrio Valentine Godfrey, Chief Constable of Salford
- Herbert Noah Grundy, Chief Instructions Officer, Employment and Insurance Department, Ministry of Labour
- Ivor Blashka Hart Education Officer, Grade I, Air Ministry
- Henry Cleverdon Honey, Director of Gas Administration, Board of Trade
- Albert Humphries MBE MInstCE Superintendent, Royal Ammunition Factories, Royal Arsenal
- William Aubrey Hurst For services to the Ministry of Labour
- David Sinclair Irvine, Chairman of Londonderry Local Employment Committee
- The Reverend Canon Thomas Jesse Jones Chairman of Bargoed Local Employment Committee
- Edwin Charles Jubb, Assistant Director of Navy Contracts, Admiralty
- Zachary Harris Kingdon, Superintending Electrical Engineer, Grade I., Devonport Dockyard
- Neil McLennan, Chief Constable, Dumbarton County Force
- William Macleod, Senior Inspector of Taxes, Board of Inland Revenue
- William James Mair, Chairman of Luton Local Employment Committee
- Cecil Charles Hudson Moriarty, Assistant Chief Constable of Birmingham
- Captain Joseph Dallas Nicholl MC Ulster Special Constabulary
- The Reverend Harry Pearson Hon C.F., Secretary of London Police Court Mission since 1915
- Herbert Richard Poole MBE Deputy Accountant General, Board of Customs and Excise
- Edwin Potts. For valuable services in connection with National Health Insurance
- Lieutenant-Colonel Cecil du Pré Penton Powney MBE Commandant, Metropolitan Special Constabulary
- William Alfred Radley, Technical Adviser, Small Arms Ammunition, Royal Arsenal
- George Randell-Evans, Chairman, St. Pancras and Hampstead War Pensions Committee
- Charles John Ritchie MBE JP Senior Staff Officer, Metropolitan Special Constabulary
- Arthur Francis Rowe, Chief Clerk in the Department of the Director of Public Prosecutions
- Arthur William Rowe MBE Senior Principal Clerk, Ministry of Pensions
- Mark Scott JP Chairman of Selby Local Employment Committee
- Roland Ingleby Smith Deputy Director of Works and Chief Architect, Ministry of Finance, Northern Ireland
- James Don Stewart, Deputy Director of Accounts, Ministry of Pensions
- James Stirling, Registrar of Births, Deaths and Marriages for Anderston Registration District, Glasgow
- Charles Terry JP Chairman of Redditch Local Employment Committee
- Lieutenant-Colonel Charles Joseph Wiley DSO Chief Insurance Officer, Ministry of Labour
- Bruce Murray Wylie, late Assistant Accountant-General, General Post Office

Diplomatic Service and Overseas List

- Cooke Adams
- Robert Edward Hartwell Baily MBE Governor of Khartoum
- Captain Rudolph Hollocombe, Translator to His Majesty's Legation at Mexico
- Gilbert Walter King, Registrar of Supreme Court for China and Korea
- Francis Joseph Patron, His Majesty's Consul at Palermo
- Julian Piggott, Rhineland High Commission
- Johannes Marius Prillevitz, His Majesty's Consul at The Hague
- Zoe Tristram
- Ernest Troughton, Rhineland High Commission
- Ebenezar Thomas Ward
- Lieutenant-Colonel John James Whitehead, British Vice-Consul at Lemberg

British India

- George Connor, Divisional and Sessions Judge, Peshawar, North-West Frontier Province
- Alexander John Happell, Deputy Commissioner of Police, Madras
- Khan Bahadur Sheik Abdul Aziz, Superintendent of Police, Punjab
- Reginald Bramley Van Wart, Principal of the Rajput Schools, Jodhpur, Rajputana
- Edwin Somerville Murray, Manager of the Aden firm of Messrs. Luke Thomas & Co., Bombay
- Ernest Edwin Coombs, Superintendent, Government Printing and Stationery, Bombay
- Ronald Wordsworth Fleming Shaw, late Registrar, Patna University, Bihar and Orissa
- Frank Wood, Managing Director, Messrs. Foucar & Co., Burma
- Janaki Nath Mukerji, Chief Electrician, Posts and Telegraphs Department
- Jeanie Morrison Gibb, St. John's Ambulance Association, Bengal
- Helen Gordon Stuart, Chief Inspectress of Girls Schools, United Provinces
- Thomas George Cuyper, retired Builder and Contractor, Bengal

Colonies, Protectorates, etc.

- William Bevan, lately Director of Agriculture, Colony of Cyprus
- Charles William Joseph Bird, Secretary, to the City Council, Gibraltar
- James Marie Brodie, Nominated Member of the Council of Government, Mauritius
- James Edward Francis Campbell, Assistant District Governor, Jerusalem-Jaffa District, Palestine
- William Henry Chase, Principal Veterinary Officer, Bechuanaland Protectorate
- Morley Thomas Dawe, Commissioner of Lands and Forests, Sierra Leone
- Cecil John Edmonds, Administrative Inspector, Kirkuk Liwa, Ministry of the Interior, Iraq
- William Alexander Elder, Principal Veterinary Officer, Swaziland
- Captain Ofcho Lewis Hancock, Commissioner of the Virgin Islands
- Edmund Wodehouse Lucie-Smith, Manager of the Colonial Bank in Jamaica, for services to the Government of Jamaica
- Allan Graham, Marwick, Assistant Commissioner, Hlatikulu District, Swaziland
- Rupert Otway, Inspector of Works and Roads, Montserrat
- Major Herbert Walter Peebles DSO Commissioner of Montserrat
- Arthur Elliott Goodchild Terry, Valuer, First Class, Board of Inland Revenue; for services as one of the Joint Secretaries, Compensation (Ireland) Commission
- Frank Arthur Verney, Principal Veterinary Officer, Basutoland
- Frederick Henry Watkins ISO Magistrate of Nevis

Honorary Officers

- All Effendi Jarallah MBE Member of the Supreme Court of Palestine
- Ruhi Bey Abdel Hadi, District Officer, Jerusalem-Jaffa District, Palestine
- Abder Rahman Effendi El Haj, Mayor of Haifa, Palestine

==== Member of the Order of the British Empire (MBE) ====
===== Military Division =====
Army

- Sub-Conductor Lancelot John Addison, Indian Army Service Corps
- Quartermaster and Captain Howard Armishaw, 5th Battalion, The Royal Warwickshire Regiment, Territorial Army
- Lieutenant Philip Taylor Baddiley, Regular Army Reserve of Officers, General List, 3rd Battalion, Iraq Levies
- Assistant Commissary and Lieutenant Charles Gordon Bartrop, Indian Miscellaneous List
- Captain Frank Melville Moyle Bawden, 4th/5th Battalion, The Duke of Cornwall's Light Infantry, Territorial Army
- Regimental Sergeant-Major William Black, Royal Engineers
- Captain William Maurice Broomhall, Royal Engineers
- Quartermaster and Lieutenant Walter John Cook MC 1st Battalion, Coldstream Guards
- Staff Sergeant-Major Frederick James Coplin, Royal Army Service Corps
- Captain Harry Dawkins, Royal Engineers, Indian Army
- Captain George Thomas Dorrell VC 90th (1st London) Field Brigade, Royal Artillery, Territorial Army
- Lieutenant William George Ide Miers Etherington, Army Educational Corps
- Captain Richard Maurice Foskett, Indian Army Service Corps
- First-Class Staff Sergeant-Major William James Franks, Royal Army Service Corps
- Captain William Henry Godfrey MM 13th Battalion, The London Regiment, Territorial Army
- Lieutenant Cyril Harvey Gowan MC 13th/18th Hussars, Cavalry Instructor, Iraq Army
- Captain James Grassie DSO Record Office, Perth
- Sub-Conductor George Sydney Griffin, Indian Army Service Corps
- Lieutenant Francis William Hall, Regular Army Reserve of Officers
- General List, Ordnance Officer, Iraq Levies
- Captain Frank Albert Hilbom AMIMechE Royal Tank Corps
- Temp. Lieutenant Harold Douglas Hill, General List
- Quartermaster and Captain Daniel Hutton, Royal Engineer's
- Assistant Commissary and Lieutenant Charles Gowan Jackson, Indian Miscellaneous List
- Quartermaster and Captain Thomas Manfield
- 4th Battalion, The Royal Welsh Fusiliers, Territorial Army
- Captain Frederick Mattocks, Royal Engineers, Indian Army
- Ordnance Officer, 4th Class, and Captain John Stuart Omond MC Royal Army Ordnance Corps
- Captain Charles Edward Ovington MC 5th City of London Regiment (London Rifle Brigade), Territorial Army
- Quartermaster and Lieutenant James Radford, 2nd Battalion, The Devonshire Regiment
- Lieutenant James Malcolm Leslie Renton, The Rifle Brigade, Deputy-Assistant Adjutant General, Iraq Levies
- Sub-Conductor Benjamin Rigby, Indian Miscellaneous List
- Quartermaster and Lieutenant George Frederick William Smith DCM The Queen's Bays (2nd Dragoon Guards)
- Assistant Commissary and Lieutenant Walter Smith, Indian, Miscellaneous List
- Captain Eneas Symonds, 3rd/19th Hyderabad Regiment, Indian Army
- Quartermaster and Lieutenant Thomas Stephen Tate MC 1st Battalion, Soote Guards
- Quartermaster and Captain Harry William Thomas Vine, Royal Army Service Corps
- Quartermaster and Lieutenant Robert Henderson White, 6th Battalion, The Seaforth Highlanders, Territorial Army
- Subadar Major Barkat Ram Bahadur, Indian Medical Department

Royal Air Force

- Flying Officer Ernest Stanford Bullen
- Flying Officer Edwin James Newman
- Sergeant-Major 1st Class, Albert Edward Harbot
- Sergeant-Major 2nd Class, Reuben Charles Pennicott

===== Civil Division =====
- Frederick Copping Allworth, Staff Clerk, Ministry of Health
- John Hernaman Boulton, Chief Superintendent, Birmingham Police
- William Bradley, Senior. Costings Investigator, Army Contracts Directorate, War Office
- William Reginald Busbridge, Station-Master at Dover
- William Arthur Carson Assistant Accountant, Ministry of Finance, Northern Ireland
- Frank Randall Coles, Clerk to the Hackney Board of Guardians
- Charles Stockley Collins, Superintendent, Metropolitan Police
- William Arthur Dalley, Manager, Birmingham Employment Exchange
- Frederick Darlington, late Headmaster of the Dockyard School, Devonport
- Herbert Davey, Secretary of the Association of Poor Law Unions
- Thomas Davies, Staff Officer, Chief Inspector's Office, Inland Revenue
- Joseph William Dobie, Accountant, Board of Customs and Excise
- William Donaldson, Waterguard Superintendent, 1st Class, Board of Customs and Excise
- Stanley Walter Dowden, Clerk, Higher Clerical Class, H.M. Land Registry
- Joseph Dryden, Superintendent, Durham County Police
- James Thomson Edwards, Manager, Edinburgh Employment Exchange, Ministry of Labour
- Edward James Fair, Manager, Tavistock Street, Employment Exchange, London
- Mary Caroline Eraser, Voluntary worker among soldiers and their dependants for 30 years
- William James Gibbs, Steward at Tooting Bee Asylum under Metropolitan Asylums Board
- William Cecil Glover, Higher Executive Officer, Ministry of Agriculture, Northern Ireland
- William Egerton Glover, Chief Superintendent, Liverpool Police
- Robert Frederick Goldsack, Member of Plymouth and District War Pensions Committee
- James MeDougall Graham, Manager, Govan Employment Exchange
- Richard John Halford, Superintendent, London City Police
- William Smith Hankins, Commandant, Metropolitan Special Constabulary Reserve
- Jane Ellen Leslie Harrison, Member of Stoke-on-Trent, Cheadle and District War Pensions Committee
- Samuel William Francis Hart, Surveyor, Board of Customs and Excise
- Thomas Hickman, Clerk of the Chamber and Messenger of the Great Seal, House of Lords
- Alfred House, Staff Officer, Companies Department, Board of Trade
- John Ireland, Senior Superintendent, Mercantile Marine Office, Bristol, Board of Trade
- John Ivin, Deputy Chief Constable, Bedfordshire Police
- James Alister Kirkpatrick, Assistant Accountant, Ministry of Home Affairs, Northern Ireland
- Margaret Katharine Lea, Woman Inspector, Ministry of Health
- Livsey Lees, Manager, Oldham Employment Exchange
- Bertram Ralph Leftwich, Librarian, Board of Customs and Excise
- Hugh Coffey Love, Superintending Officer, Ministry of Education, Northern Ireland
- Alexander Marr, Chief Constable, Montrose Burgh Police Force
- Walter Marshall, Mate Higher Clerical Officer, Board of Trade
- Henry John Martin, Superintendent, Metropolitan Police
- Alfred Bertram Melles, Horticultural Officer, France, Imperial War Graves Commission
- George Monro, Commandant, Metropolitan Special Constabulary
- John Morrison, Assistant Chief Constable, Lanark County Police Force
- John Burton Newman, Education Officer, Grade II., Air Ministry
- John Newson. Senior Staff Officer, Statistical Office, Board of Customs and Excise
- Elizabeth Claudia Owen, Chief Woman Officer, Wales Division, Ministry of Labour
- Charles William Palmer, Clerk (Higher Grade), Inland Revenue
- William Pinder, Ulster Special Constabulary
- Henry Gratton Pring, District Commandant, Ulster Special Constabulary
- Gerard John Rawes, Staff Officer, Chief Inspector's Office, Inland Revenue
- Captain Samuel Ray, Auditor, Sinai Military Railway
- Henry Ernest Redfern, Superintendent, West Riding County Police
- George Rowley Richardson, Statistical Officer, Air Ministry
- Alice Rosa Ridgeway, Chief Woman Officer, N.E. Division, Ministry of Labour
- Ellen Phipps Robinson, Honorary Secretary of Northampton Cripple Children's Fund
- David Rock JP District Commandant, Ulster Special Constabulary
- Colonel Henry Charles Savage, Commandant, Metropolitan Special Constabulary
- Alfred William Scarlett, Waterguard Superintendent 1st Class, Board of Customs and Excise
- Harry Shires, Civil Engineer, Works and Buildings Department, Air Ministry
- Olive Story, Member of Finsbury, Holborn and City of London War Pensions Committee
- Caroline Swindells, Senior Chief Superintendent of Typists, Board of Inland Revenue
- Robert Henry Todd, District Commandant, Ulster Special Constabulary
- Ernest Arthur Train, Manager, Employment Exchange, Hull
- Charles Walker, Superintendent, Derbyshire Police
- Lucy Withrington, Lady Superintendent, Pension Issue Office
- Herbert Woodmore, Superintendent, Metropolitan Police

Diplomatic Service and Overseas List

- Lazarus Sarkies Arathoon, His Majesty's Vice-Consul at Macassar
- George Davis Baker, Archivist at His Majesty's Embassy at Washington
- Frances M. Coleridge, His Majesty's Embassy, Berlin, Germany
- James Dalton, His Majesty's Vice-Consul at Samarang
- Samuel Evans, Head Clerk of the Intelligence Section of the Sudan Agency in Cairo
- Egerton Shaw Humber, His Majesty's Vice-Consul at Panama
- Eve B. Napier, Head of the Commercial Registry, His Majesty's Embassy at Washington
- Frank Pattman, Cypher Officer at the Residency, Cairo

British India

- M. E. Ry. Bao Bahadur Abhiramapuram Krishnamoorthi Sastrigal Rajah Ayyar Avargal, Superintendent of Police, Madras
- George Edward Johnston, Deputy Commissioner, Excise Department, Madras
- Herbert John Bomer, Deputy Transportation Superintendent, Great Indian Peninsula Railway, Bombay
- Agnes Dorothea Haskell, St. John's Ambulance Nursing Division, Bengal
- Major Henry Mansfield, Deputy Superintendent, Campbell Medical School and Hospital, Calcutta
- Helen Stubbs, Fyzabad, United Provinces
- Harry Lamacraft, Deputy Superintendent of Police, Hissar, Punjab
- Chan Ta Hin, Merchant and Contractor, Burma
- Mohamed Ayoob, alias U Shwe Yun, Pleader, Government Prosecutor, Mergui, Burma
- Saravaiya Amritaraj, Health Officer, Civil and Military Station, Bangalore, Mysore
- George Prior de la Hey, Personal Assistant to the Military Secretary to His Excellency the Viceroy
- Epiphanio Mariano Sequeira, Treasury Officer, Bushire Residency, Persian Gulf
- Lieutenant James Charlemagne Chalke, Indian Medical Department, Assistant Surgeon to His Excellency the Governor
- Henry Martin, Head Clerk, British Trade Agency, Gyantse, Tibet
- William Thomas Ottewill, Parliamentary Clerk, India Office, Assistant Secretary to the Fourth and Fifth Assemblies of the League of Nations

Colonies, Protectorates, etc.

- Samuel Patrick Bland, Assistant Director of Public Works, Zanzibar
- Annie Isabel Brizzell, Matron, Maseru Hospital, Basutoland Nursing Service
- Lawrence de Martino For services to the Malta Association in London
- Giuseppe Despott, Superintendent of Fisheries, Island of Malta
- Ludovic Smith Hohenkerk, Superintendent of Forest Surveys, British Guiana
- Edward Robert Mifsud, Clerk to the Executive Council and Clerk to the Nominated Council, Island of Malta
- Alexander Walker Money, Second Class Valuer, Valuation Department, Inland Revenue (Scotland); for services as Investigator, Compensation (Ireland) Commission
- Nicholas Wilfrid Morgappah, Assistant Registrar-General, Registrar-General's Department, Ceylon
- Frank Sands, of Singapore, Commissioner for Malaya of the Boy Scouts Association
- Ernest Goldfinch Seagoe, Commandant of the British Division, New Hebrides Constabulary
- John Howard Sempill, Chief of Police and Provost Marshal General, Bermuda
- Glencora Barnes Schneider, of Colombo, Ceylon. In recognition of her public services.
- Thomas Walter White, Assistant, Post and Telegraph Department, Ceylon
- Margaret Isabel Willdon, Matron, Leper Settlement, Botsabelo, Basutoland

Honorary Members

- Ibrahim Bey Habeish Stambuli, Assistant Commandant of Police, Jerusalem
- Qustandi Effendi Qanaze, Headmaster, Government Secondary Boys School, Nazareth, Palestine
- Mikhayel Mani, Member of the District Court of Jaffa, Palestine
- Ho Siak Kuan, Assistant Secretary for Chinese Affairs, Straits Settlements

=== Kaisar-i-Hind Medal ===
First Class

- The Hon. Florence Mary Macnaghten, in charge Canadian Mission, Kangra, Punjab
- Winifred Spicer, Lady Superintendent, Lady Minto's Indian Nursing Association, and Matron of the Railway Hospital, Ajmer, Rajputana
- The Reverend Lorrain Barber, Missionary, Faridpur Industrial School, Bengal
- The Reverend Cæsar Augustus Rodney Janvier, American Presbyterian Mission, Principal, Ewing Christian College, Allahabad, United Provinces
- Esther Gimson Bare, Clara Swain Methodist Episcopal Mission Hospital, Bareilly, United Provinces
- Dorothy Cisley de la Hey, Principal, Queen Mary's College for Women, Madras
- Mother Henrietta, in charge of the Nurses at the Ranchi Sadar Hospital, Bihar and Orissa
- Edith Louisa Young, Palwal Mission Dispensary, Gurgaon District, Punjab

=== British Empire Medal (BEM) ===
==== Military Division ====
For Gallantry

- James Burke. In recognition of his action in stopping runaway horses on two occasions at great personal risk.

For Meritorious Service

- Riza Chaqir, Cavass employed at H.M. Legation, Durazzo
- John Gould, Head Constable, Royal Ulster Constabulary
- Sergeant Hector Gray, Park-keeper at Holyrood Park
- John Hayes, Head Constable, Royal Ulster Constabulary
- Ibrahim Kiatovic, Head Cavass at H.M. Embassy Constantinople
- Bertie Wallace Tibbie. For public services in saving life.

=== Air Force Cross (AFC) ===
- Flight Lieutenant Richard Burnard Munday DSC
- Flight Lieutenant William Edmund Somervell

=== Air Force Medal (AFM) ===
- Sergeant (Pilot) Alfred Percy Reeve

=== Imperial Service Order (ISO) ===
Home Civil Service

- William L. Calderwood FRSE Inspector of Salmon Fisheries for Scotland
- William Thomas Chard, Inspector of Rates, Rating of Government Property Department
- Arthur Harold Wyld Cleave Deputy Master, Royal Mint, Ottawa, Canada
- Edward William Colvill, Principal Ship Surveyor, Board of Trade
- William Donaldson, Waterguard Superintendent, H.M. Customs and Excise
- Montague Spencer Guiseppi, Superintendent of Legal Literary Research Booms, Public Record Office
- Joseph Johnston, First Class Clerk, Central Office, Supreme Court of Judicature
- Robert McIlroy, Superintending Engineer, London Engineering District, General Post Office
- Arthur James Pearce, Staff Officer, Board of Control
- James Ridley Redhead, Principal Clerk, Estate Duty Office, Board of Inland Revenue

Colonial Civil Service

- William James Clemens, Secretary and Chief Inspector of the Public Service Board, Commonwealth of Australia
- Henry Edmonds Downie, Commissioner of Taxes, State of Tasmania
- Thomas James Greenwood, Commissioner, First Grade, Colony of Cyprus
- Eugene Patrick Griffin MBE Chief Assistant Secretary, Office of Colonial Secretary, Gibraltar
- Walter Belinfante Isaacs, lately Supervisor, Revenue Department, Island Treasurer and Manager of the Government Savings Bank, Jamaica
- William Miller, Surveyor-General, Bahama Islands
- Charles Rodway Morrison, Office Assistant to the Provincial Commissioner of the Southern Province, Sierra Leone
- Charles Adrien Pollonais, Assistant Treasurer, Colony of Trinidad and Tobago
- Bertram Tanner, Headmaster, Queen's College, Hong Kong
- Edgar Allen Garvin Vanderstraaten, Third Landing Surveyor, Customs Department, Ceylon

Indian Civil Service

- Hugh Bainbridge Bendle, Assistant Commissioner, Excise Department, and Secretary to the Commissioner of Excise, Madras
- Khan Bahadur Fardunji Mancherji Dastur, Registrar of the University of Bombay
- Andrew Frank Emmer, Assistant Secretary to Resident and Treasury Officer, Hyderabad (Deccan)
- Raj Bahadur Sardar Tirath Singh, Deputy Superintendent of Police, United Provinces
- Thomas Stephens Farmer, Superintendent, Reformatory School, Delhi
- Gerson de Luna, Superintendent, Residency Office, Aden
- Sheikh Imam-ud-Dm, Inspector of Police and Head Clerk, Office of Senior Superintendent of Police, Lahore, Punjab

=== Imperial Service Medal (ISM) ===
- Abdul Kadir, late Daftri, Government of India, Foreign and Political Department
- Harakh Bam, late Jemadar chaprasi, Deputy Commissioner's Office, Banchi, Bihar and Orissa
