= Encyclopaedia of Indian Literature =

Encyclopedia of Indian literature

- The six volumes of the encyclopedia
- Language: English
- Subject: Indian literature and language
- Publisher: Sahitya Akademi, New Delhi
- Publication date: Vol. 1: 1987; Vol. 2: 1988; Vol. 3: 1989; Vol. 4: 1991; Vol. 5: 1992; Vol. 6: 1994
- Publication place: India
- Media type: 6 volumes, hardbound
- OCLC: 430192715

The Encyclopaedia of Indian Literature is a multi-volume English language encyclopedia of Indian literature published by Sahitya Akademi, India's National Academy of Letters. The idea for the project emerged in the mid-1970s, and three volumes were planned to cover all Indian literature, including that in native vernaculars. The scope of the project expanded as several editors-in-chief succeeded one another; six volumes were published between 1987 and 1993. The work received a positive reception, though a number of critics noted occasional inaccuracies in entries regarding a few of the subjects surveyed in what was otherwise hailed as a landmark in Indian scholarship.

== History ==
At the 1975 annual meeting of the General Council of the Sahitya Akademi, E.M.J. Venniyoor and K.M. George proposed that the Akademi should plan and publish an encyclopaedia of Indian literature. The proposal was approved and the executive board set up a committee to examine the proposal, consisting of Suniti Kumar Chatterji as president, K. R. Srinivasa Iyengar as vice-president, and K.M. George, V. Y. Kantak, Amrit Rai and Vasant Bapat. The encyclopaedia was intended to be a single source of information about all significant Indian literary movements, writers and works in Indian history. It was envisaged that 12,000 entries would be necessary to cover this and that the finished work would be published in two volumes, each of approximately 1,000 pages. The topics and writers to be covered were to be determined by consultation with an advisory board. The committee asked K.M. George to be editor-in-chief; his role would be supervising the overall planning for, and execution of, the project. An editorial unit was set up at Trivandrum, Kerala. The editors estimated that the encyclopaedia would take five years to complete. The entire executive board of the Akademi, which consisted of representatives of all the languages it recognised, was to act as the editorial board, and a small steering committee was also to be established. Once these recommendations were approved, the project was launched.

While the compilation of lists of topics was in progress, dissatisfaction with the General Council emerged, and the location of the encyclopaedia unit at Trivandrum was questioned. To resolve the issues, a special meeting of the executive board was convened in 1976 to re-examine the project, and the board decided to relocate the encyclopaedia unit to Delhi. George resigned as editor-in chief after this move and Sitanshu Yashaschandra was appointed to replace him in 1977. Yashaschandra wanted an encyclopaedia with a broader coverage and a length over 3,000 pages, in three volumes. In 1978, the executive board discontinued its editorial function, and set up a steering committee consisting of Umashankar Joshi as president, Vinayaka Krishna Gokak as vice-president, with K. R. Srinivasa Iyengar, V. Y. Kantak, Vasant Bapat and Vidya Niwas Misra. Iyengar felt that the Encyclopaedia was "the most ambitious project" undertaken by the Akademi and that it might take years to complete. Yasaschandra was more optimistic, being certain that all three volumes could be published by 1982. By the time he withdrew from the project and the Akademi in 1982 the first volume had yet to be published. Amaresh Datta joined the project as the new editor-in-chief in 1984. Members of the editorial staff were recruited on an ad hoc basis for specific languages or zones and the work was expedited. The encyclopaedia as published ran to six volumes, and over five thousand demi-quarto-sized pages.

== Publication ==
The first volume in the series was published in 1987, under the auspices of the then prime minister Rajiv Gandhi. In his editorial, Datta outlined the ambitions of the project, stating that it was designed to provide comprehensive coverage, with the matter arranged according to theme or author in alphabetical order, of how literature developed, from its Vedic/Sanskrit origins down to contemporary works in English by Indian authors. It would range over the literary heritage of each of India's 22 major languages, 25 if one regards Pali, Prakrit and Apabhramsa as distinct categories.

Datta also edited volumes 2 and 3, published in 1988 and 1989 respectively. He retired from the Akademi on reaching seventy in 1990. Mohan Lal succeeded him as the editor-in-chief and it was under his direction that the fourth and fifth volumes, respectively published in 1991 and 1992, came out. After Lal's death in an accident, the sixth and final volume, edited by Param Abichandani and K. C. Dutt, was published in 1994. K. Ayyappa Paniker was appointed editor-in-chief of revisions.

== Reception ==
The first volume, published in 1987, was widely acclaimed. The Hindu newspaper, in its 21 July edition, greeted the first book by praising it for exemplary editorial expertise and massive, wide-ranging scholarship. The Hindustan Times, on 25 October, hailed the encyclopedia as a landmark for reference books on Indian culture. The Times of India, on 10 April 1988, considered the volume a first step in advancing towards a more extensive overview of Indian literature, and expressed hope that realizing such an end would eventually lead to academic courses and the issuing of a library of Indian masterpieces and a fresh wave of new critical studies. The Indian Book Industry, commended the volume in July 1987, "Lovers of Indian literature, both at home and abroad, owe a deep debt of gratitude to the Sahitya Akademi for bringing out this Encyclopaedia, a work of pioneering nature indeed".

The reviewer of The Statesman, published on 2 July 1988, thought otherwise:

To mention all instances of carelessness, errors of fact, omissions in the work and its entries will require 100 pages and it will be tiresome reading. On the whole the first volume of our Sahitya Akademi's Encyclopaedia of Indian Literature has been unworthy of the institution which has produced it. It is not well designed and whatever design it may have has not been properly executed... There is nothing in the work to show that it has passed through the hands of an able, responsible and hard-working editor.

In 1990, Vinayak Purohit of the Indian Institute of Social Research, Bombay, appealed to Prime Minister Vishwanath Pratap Singh "to stop the publication of further volumes of this shameful Encyclopaedia"; he cited numerous instances of error of fact, repetition, balance, and other lapses. He wrote to the new editor-in-chief Mohan Lal: "Please do not work at the futile break-neck pace of one volume per year. Encyclopaedias are never produced with such bureaucratic targets."

== Defamation suit ==
Ujjalkumar Majumdar's article on Bengali poet Shakti Chatterjee in the Encyclopaedia angered Chatterjee, and he filed a defamation suit against the Akademi. The Indian Post subsequently headlined a seven column article: "A Poet Fights for his Reputation" and went on to report "Bengal's most popular poet, Sakti Chattopadhyay, smarting under the inference in the Sahitya Akademi's Encyclopaedia of Indian Literature that his work has been influenced by his alcoholic excesses and sexual escapades, has in an unprecedented move sued the Akademi". The Illustrated Weekly of India titled its article on the controvosy "The Angry Muse" and reported "Shakti Chattolpadhyay is angry and hurt. The celebrated Bengali poet is livid that the Sahitya Akademi, the nation's highest literary body, has cast aspersions on his character...". The Telegraph wrote of "A controversial critique and a raging poet". The Sunday Mail reported "A poet defends his habits". After a year, the controversy died down and the matter was eventually settled in 1989.

== See also ==
- Makers of Indian Literature
- Lists of encyclopedias

== Sources ==
- Rao, D. S. (2004). Five Decades: The National Academy of Letters, India : a Short History of Sahitya Akademi. New Delhi: Sahitya Akademi. ISBN 978-81-260-2060-7.
