= Ramamurthi =

Ramamurthi is a name. Notable people with the name include:

- Bhaskar Ramamurthi, Indian academic
- Balasubramaniam Ramamurthi, Indian neurosurgeon
- P. Ramamurthi (1908–1987), Indian politician
- Nallamuthu Ramamurthi, Indian politician
- K. Ramamurthi Naidu (1883–1942), Indian bodybuilder, strongman, and wrestler
