= Amaresh Datta =

Indian scholar of English literature (died 2020)

Amaresh Datta (1917 or 1918 – 6 August 2020) was an Indian scholar of English literature. He was the chief editor of the Encyclopaedia of Indian Literature published by Sahitya Akademi.

== Biography ==
Datta began teaching at the Sagar University in Madhya Pradesh in the early 1950s. Datta taught at Gauhati University for 20 years, retiring in 1980 as the dean. He was honoured by the varsity with the position of emeritus professor. He also taught at the Dibrugarh University where he was the head of the department of English. He was the recipient of an honorary doctorate degree awarded by Assam University, Silchar.

Considered an authority of Shakespeare, he published a book Shakespeare's Tragic Vision and Art (1963) which was appreciated by critics. In a review, Madeleine Doran described the book as "refreshingly old-fashioned" and as being deeply perceptive, with a lot of new insights being put forward on individual tragedies, but also noted the circularity in reasoning as a fundamental weakness.

He published a collection of poems, Captive Moments (1971), and has been honoured by the International Association of Poetry of Rome for his poetry.

In 2010, he received the Kamal Kumari National Award. He received the Krishna Kanta Handiqui National award in 2018 offered by Krishna Kanta Handiqui State Open University.

He died on 6 August 2020. His death was condoled by the Chief Minister of Assam.

== Bibliography ==
Works published by Amaresh Datta include:

- Captive Moments (1971)
- Time's Harvest: A Cycle of Poems and Drawings Based on the Ramayana and the Mahabharata (1996)
- Lotus and the Cross (1997)
- Mysticism in Poetry
- India's Cultural Unity-Fact and Fiction
- Poetry, Religion and Culture and Sri Sankar Dev
- Banaprastha (2008)
- Comedy: a Rhetorical Fiction: Five Essays on Shakespeare's Comedies
- In the Valley of Time and Tide
