= De la Hey =

de la Hey is a surname. Notable people with the surname include:

- Dorothy de la Hey (1884–1981), English educator
- Serena de la Hey (born 1967), Kenyan-british sculptor
