= R. Sivabhogam =

First Female Chartered Accountant of India

- Born: 23 July 1907
- Died: 14 June 1966 (aged 58)
- Education: Queen Mary's College
- Occupation: Chartered Accountant

R Sivabhogam (Ramasamy) (born 23 July 1907 in India), was the first female chartered accountant of India.

R Sivabhogam did her early schooling in Lady Wellington School in Triplicane neighborhood in Chennai, she was a student of Sister Subbalakshmi in field of Social Service and graduated from The Queen Mary’s College Chennai. She participated in non cooperation movement launched by Mahatma Gandhi and was imprisoned for a year. After her release Sivabhogam registered for Government Diploma in Accountancy and created history by becoming the first female Indian accountant in 1933. She underwent article-ship training under Mr. C S Sastri.

Sivabhogam could not start her independent practice immediately after her training as the then British Government enacted a law in India under which people who had undergone imprisonment were prevented from registering themselves as Accountants. Sivabhogam filed a writ petition to quash such an Act and got the verdict in her favour. To note the issue a separate file by name Sivabhogam was opened in Delhi India for the petition.

Shivabhogam started her independent practice in 1937 and was also a part-time assistant with M/s. Sastri and Shah. On the formation of The Institute of Chartered Accountants of India (ICAI) in 1949 Sivabhogam was enrolled as a member and became a fellow on 17 June 1950. Sivabhogam became the Chairperson of the Southern India Regional Council (SIRC) of the Institute of Chartered Accountants of India (the then Madras Council). She is the only woman so far to have held this position, for a continuous period of three years from 1955 to 1958. She was also a senate member of the University of Madras. She remained single throughout her life.

Sivabhogam had been very active in social service and primarily for the cause of women’s education. She was a believer in Gandhian principles and wore Khadi till her death on 14 June 1966. She was a part of Youth league and Swadesi league and went from teaching khadi based block printing to boycotting foreign goods .
