= Herbert William Jackson =

Major-General Herbert William Jackson CB CSI DSO
- Born: 9 June 1872
- Died: 9 September 1940 (aged 68)
- Military career
- Allegiance: United Kingdom
- Branch: British Army
- Rank: Major-General
- Awards: CB, CSI, DSO

Major-General Herbert William Jackson CB CSI DSO (9 June 1872 – 9 September 1940) was an officer of the British Indian Army.

== Life ==
Herbert William Jackson was the son of Major W.W. Jackson and was born on 9 June 1872. He was educated at Bedford Modern School and the Royal Military College, Sandhurst, where he graduated 81st in 1890.

He was gazetted as a second lieutenant in the Middlesex Regiment (Duke of Cambridge's own) in 1891. He transferred to the Indian Staff Corps in 1893 and joined the 17th Regiment of Madras Infantry. He saw active service in Burma (1895–96), China, the Western Front during World War I, Afghanistan (1919–20), East Persia and Waziristan. He was awarded the Distinguished Service Order in 1918. In 1920 he was appointed CSI and in the 1925 Birthday Honours was made a Companion of the Order of the Bath (CB).

Jackson married Eileen, daughter of Lt-General Sir R. Wapshire (Indian Army). They had one daughter. He retired from the Army in 1927 and settled in Cheltenham. Herbert William Jackson died on 9 September 1940.
