= Henry Calderwood =

Scottish minister and philosopher (1830–1897)

Rev Henry Calderwood FRSE LLD
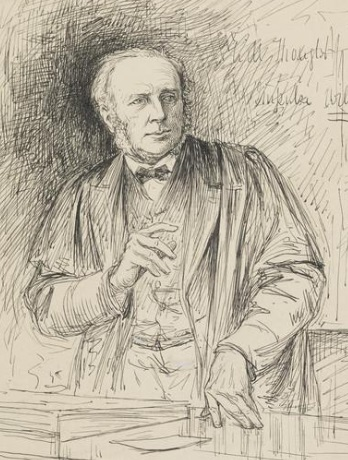
- Calderwood by William Hole (1884)
- Born: 10 May 1830; Peebles, Scotland
- Died: 19 November 1897 (aged 67); Edinburgh, Scotland
- Occupations: Minister, philosopher
- Spouse: Anne Hutton Leadbetter
- Children: William Leadbetter Calderwood

Education
- Education: Edinburgh Institution; High School in Edinburgh; University of Edinburgh

Philosophical work
- Era: 19th-century philosophy
- Region: Western philosophy
- School: Scottish Common Sense Realism, Theistic evolution
- Institutions: University of Glasgow; University of Edinburgh
- Main interests: Metaphysics, Ethics, Philosophy of mind, Philosophy of religion
- Notable ideas: Knowledge of the Infinite, Divine sanction, Theistic evolution

Rev Henry Calderwood FRSE LLD (10 May 1830, Peebles – 19 November 1897, Edinburgh) was a Scottish minister and philosopher.

== Life ==
He was born in Peebles on 10 May 1830, the son of William Calderwood, a corn merchant, and his wife Elizabeth Mitchell.

He was educated at the Edinburgh Institution and then the High School in Edinburgh, and later attended University of Edinburgh. He studied for the ministry of the United Presbyterian Church of Scotland, and in 1856 was ordained pastor of the Greyfriars church, Glasgow. He also examined in mental philosophy for the University of Glasgow from 1861 to 1864, and from 1866 conducted the moral philosophy classes at that university, until in 1868 he became Professor of Moral Philosophy at Edinburgh, holding this post until his death 29 years later. He was made LL.D. of Glasgow in 1865. At this point the family lived at 197 St Vincent Street.

In 1869 he was elected a Fellow of the Royal Society of Edinburgh his proposer being John Hutton Balfour. His address was then given as Craigrowan, a large villa in Merchiston on the west side of the city.

His first and most famous work was The Philosophy of the Infinite (1854), in which he attacked the statement of Sir William Hamilton that we can have no knowledge of the Infinite. Calderwood maintained that such knowledge, though imperfect, is real and ever-increasing; that Faith implies Knowledge. His moral philosophy is in direct antagonism to Hegelian doctrine, and endeavours to substantiate the doctrine of divine sanction. Beside the data of experience, the mind has pure activity of its own whereby it apprehends the fundamental realities of life and combat. He wrote in addition A Handbook of Moral Philosophy, On the Relations of Mind and Brain, Science and Religion, The Evolution of Man's Place in Nature.

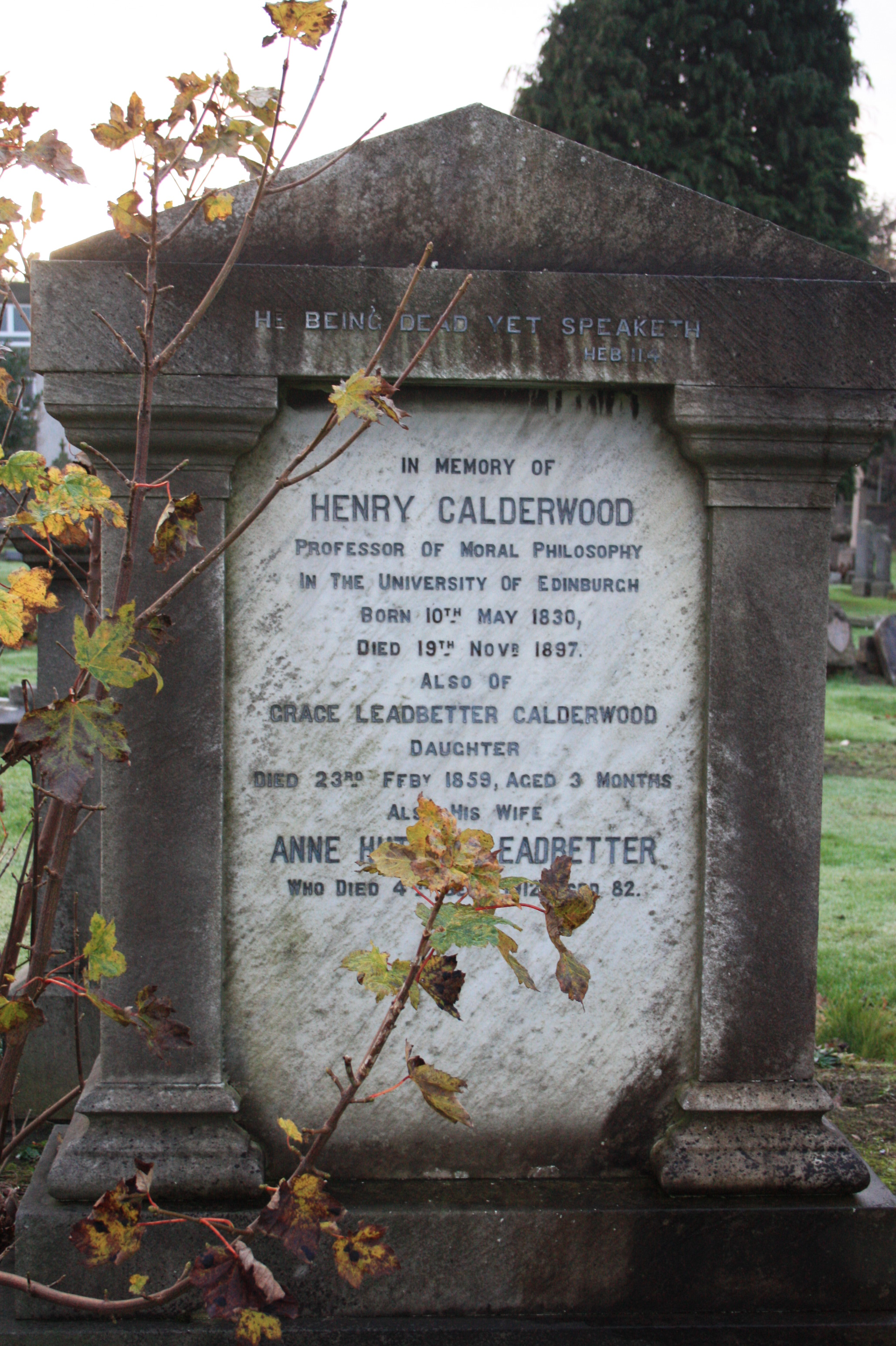
The grave of Henry Calderwood, Morningside Cemetery, Edinburgh

Among his religious works the best-known is his Parables of Our Lord, and just before his death he finished a biography of David Hume in the Famous Scots Series. His interests were not confined to religious and intellectual matters; as the first chairman of the Edinburgh school board, he worked hard to bring the Education Act into working order. He published a well-known treatise on education. In the cause of philanthropy and temperance he was indefatigable. In politics he was at first a Liberal, but became a Liberal Unionist at the time of the Home Rule Bill.

Calderwood was an advocate of theistic evolution. In his book Evolution and Man's Place in Nature he wrote that "evolution stands before us as an impressive reality in the history of Nature."

He is buried in Morningside Cemetery, Edinburgh, towards the south-west. His wife Anne Hutton Leadbetter (d.1912) lies with him.

== Family ==
He married Anne Hutton Leadbetter in 1857.

Their children included the marine biologist William Leadbetter Calderwood FRSE (1865–1950).
