= Trichur V. Ramachandran =

Padma Bhushan Trichur Ramachandran
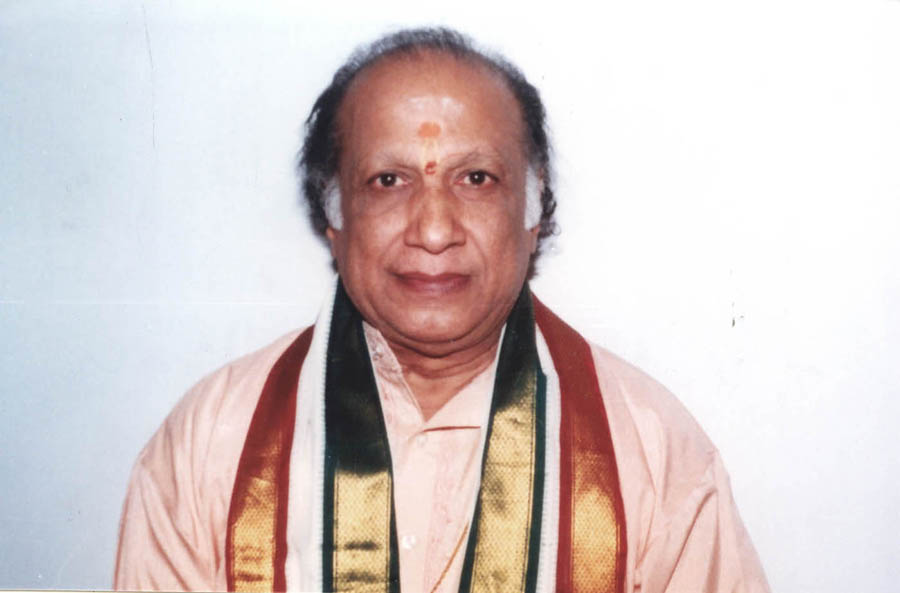
- In 2004

Background information
- Born: V Ramachandran; 9 August 1940 (age 86); Trichur, Cochin State, British India
- Genre: Carnatic music
- Occupation: singer
- Years active: 1954 - present
- Spouse: Charumathi Ramachandran
- Awards: Kalaimamani Award (1992), Padma Bhushan (2003)

Trichur V. Ramachandran (born 1940) is a Carnatic music vocalist. He received the most prestigious award of Madras Music Academy's Sangeetha Kalanidhi in 2012 from the Madras Music Academy.

== Personal Life ==
He was born in 1940 in Thrissur, Cochin State. He gave his first concert at the age of 14 and was a disciple of G. N. Balasubramaniam. Later he underwent training under M L Vasanthakumari as part of an Indian government Cultural Scholarship. Ramachandran married Charumathi in 1973.

== Awards ==
- 1987: Recipient of the Kerala Sangeetha Nataka Akademi Award
- 1992: Received title of Kalaimamani Award by the Government of Tamil Nadu, which is the highest state honour in the field of Arts.
- 2009: Vidhya Tapasvi title from TAPAS Cultural Foundation.
- 2001: Received the title of Sangeetha Choodamani by Sri Krishna Gana Sabha.
- 2003: Recipient of Sangeet Natak Akademi Award in 2003.
- 2003: Received the Padma Bhushan award from the Government of India.
