= William Leadbetter Calderwood =

Scottish marine biologist

William Leadbetter Calderwood FRSE (1865–1950) was a Scottish marine biologist. He served as Director of the Marine Biological Association Laboratory in Plymouth. He was the author of several authoritative works on marine biology. He was a specialist on the life and biology of the salmon.

He was also a talented artist.

== Life ==
He was born in Glasgow the son of Rev Henry Calderwood and Anne Hulton Leadbetter. His early childhood was spent in the family home at 197 St. Vincent Street in Central Glasgow.

He attended Merchiston Castle School in Edinburgh.

His first role was as a Demonstrator in the Zoology Department at Edinburgh University. He was Director of the Marine Biological Association Laboratory from 1889-1893. From 1898 to 1830 he was Chief Inspector of Salmon Fisheries of Scotland. He was elected a Fellow of the Royal Society of Edinburgh in 1893. His proposers were Sir William Turner, James Geikie, Alexander Crum Brown and William Rutherford. He was appointed a Companion of the Imperial Service Order (ISO) in the 1925 Birthday Honours.

During the Second World War he was in charge of Press Censorship in Scotland. In 1943 he was appointed by the Scottish Hydro-Electric Board as their principal advisor on fishery issues.

He died at Carr Bridge in Inverness-shire on 2 May 1950.

== Publications ==
- Mussel Culture and Bait Supply (1895)
- Cunning in Animals in Natural Science:December 1896
- Life of Henry Calderwood (1900) - the biography of his father
- The Life of the Salmon (1907)
- Salmon Rivers and Lochs in Scotland (1921)
- Salmon Hatchings and Salmon Migrations (1931)
- The Status and Distribution of Wild Geese and Wild Duck in Scotland (1939)
