= George Douglas Gray =

George Douglas Gray CBE
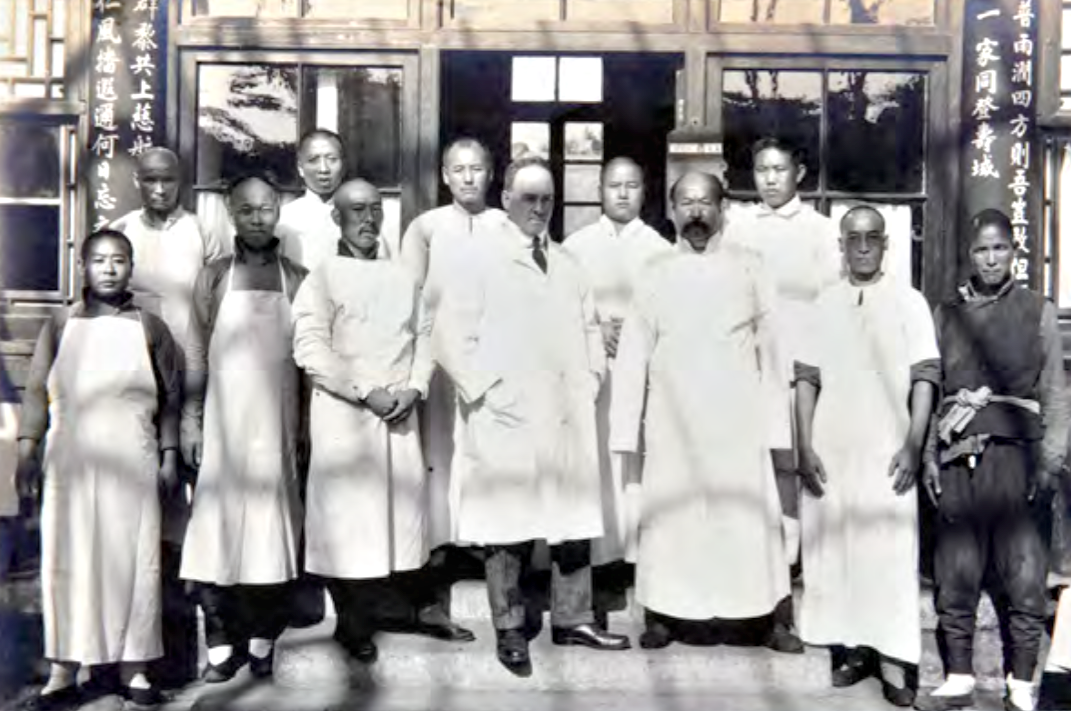
- Gray (centre) and the staff of the British Charitable Hospital in Peking.
- Born: 1872; Edinburgh, Scotland
- Died: 12 September 1946 (aged 73–74)
- Education: University of Edinburgh
- Known for: Combatting the Manchurian plague of 1910–11; Commanding officer for the hospitals for the Chinese Labour Corps in France.
- Medical career
- Profession: Physician
- Institutions: British Charitable Hospital (Peking); Hospitals for the Chinese Labour Corps in France

Lt. Col. George Douglas Gray CBE (1872 – 12 September 1946) was a Scottish physician who served in the British Army in what is now Malawi and later in what is now Kenya and then as the medical officer to the British ambassador in Peking (now Beijing), China, where he was also the medical superintendent to the British Charitable Hospital there. He assisted in combatting the plague epidemic of 1910–1911 for which he received the thanks of the Chinese government. He was subsequently the British delegate to the International Plague Conference held in Mukden in 1911.

During the First World War, he served in the Royal Army Medical Corps as commanding officer of the hospitals for the Chinese Labour Corps at Noyelles-sur-Mer. In retirement, he wrote a book extolling the benefits of the soya bean which was influenced by his experiences in China.

== Early life and family ==
George Gray was born in Edinburgh, Scotland, in 1872, the son of Robert Collie Gray, JP. He received his MB and CM from the University of Edinburgh in 1894 and his MD in 1897 for a thesis titled "Symptomatic and Idiopathic Insomnia: Its etiology and treatment".

He married Lucy Agnes RRC in 1900 and they had one son, Charles Gray, born 1909, who went on to have a distinguished career in the Indian Army.

== Career ==
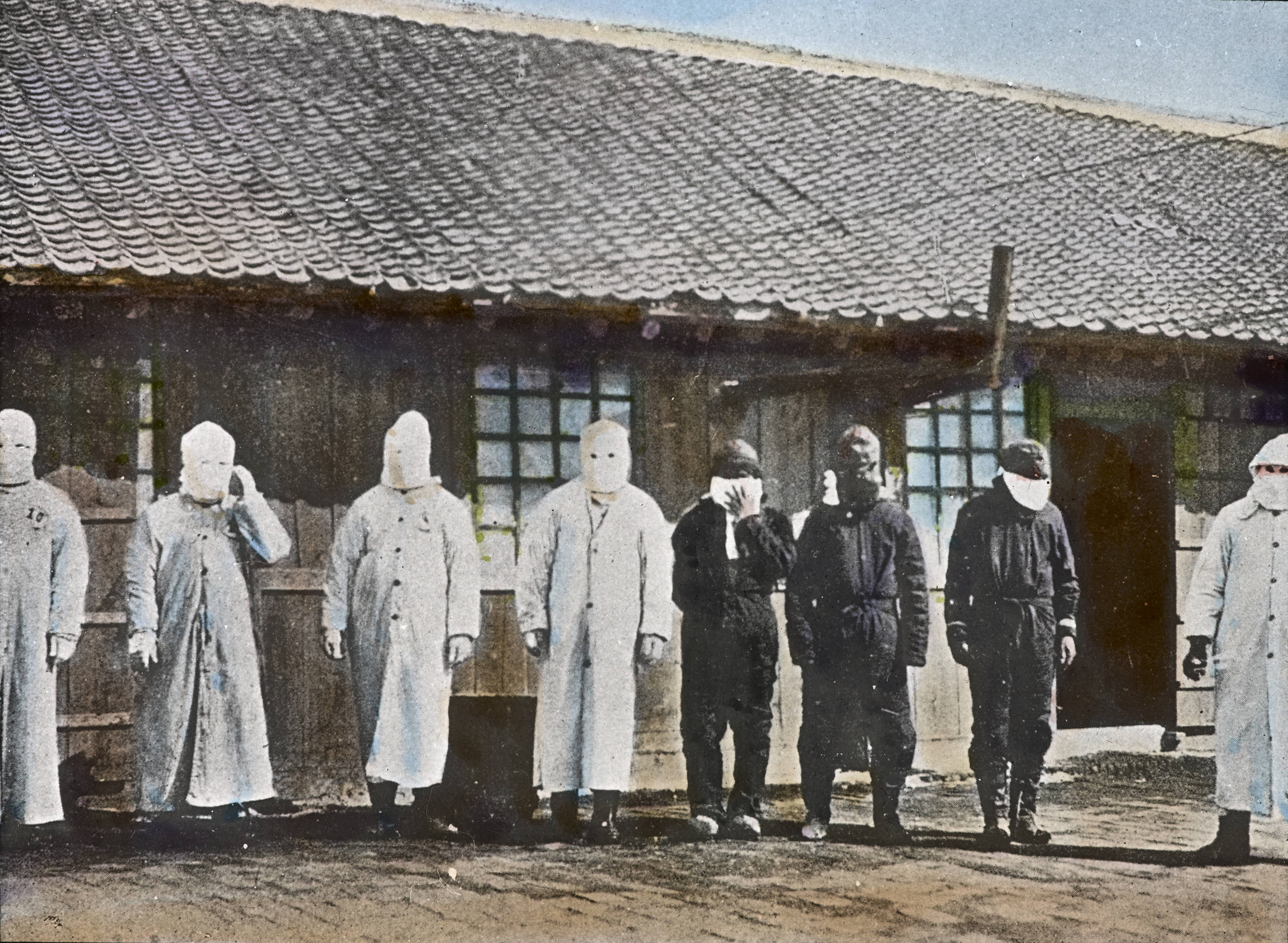
Plague workers in Mukden, c.1910.

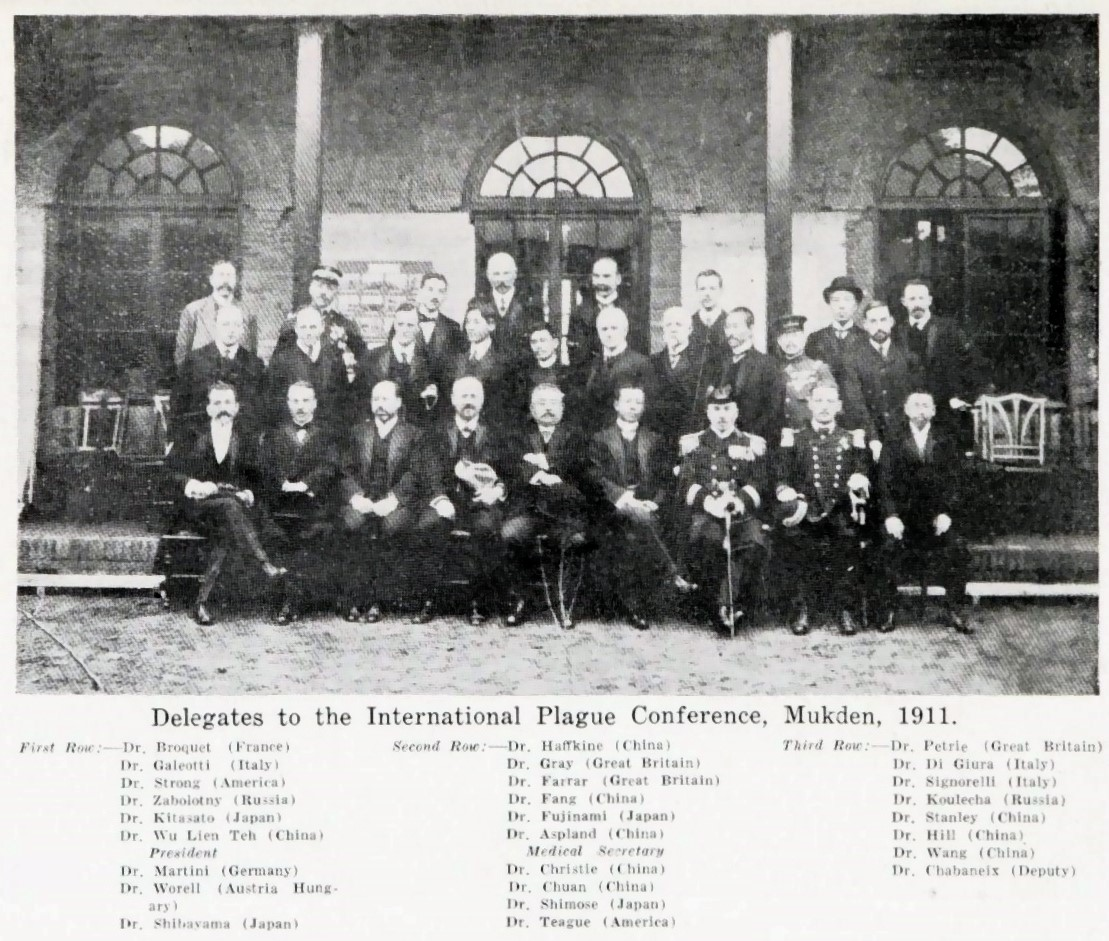
Delegates to the International Plague Conference in Mukden, 1911, with George Gray in the second row.

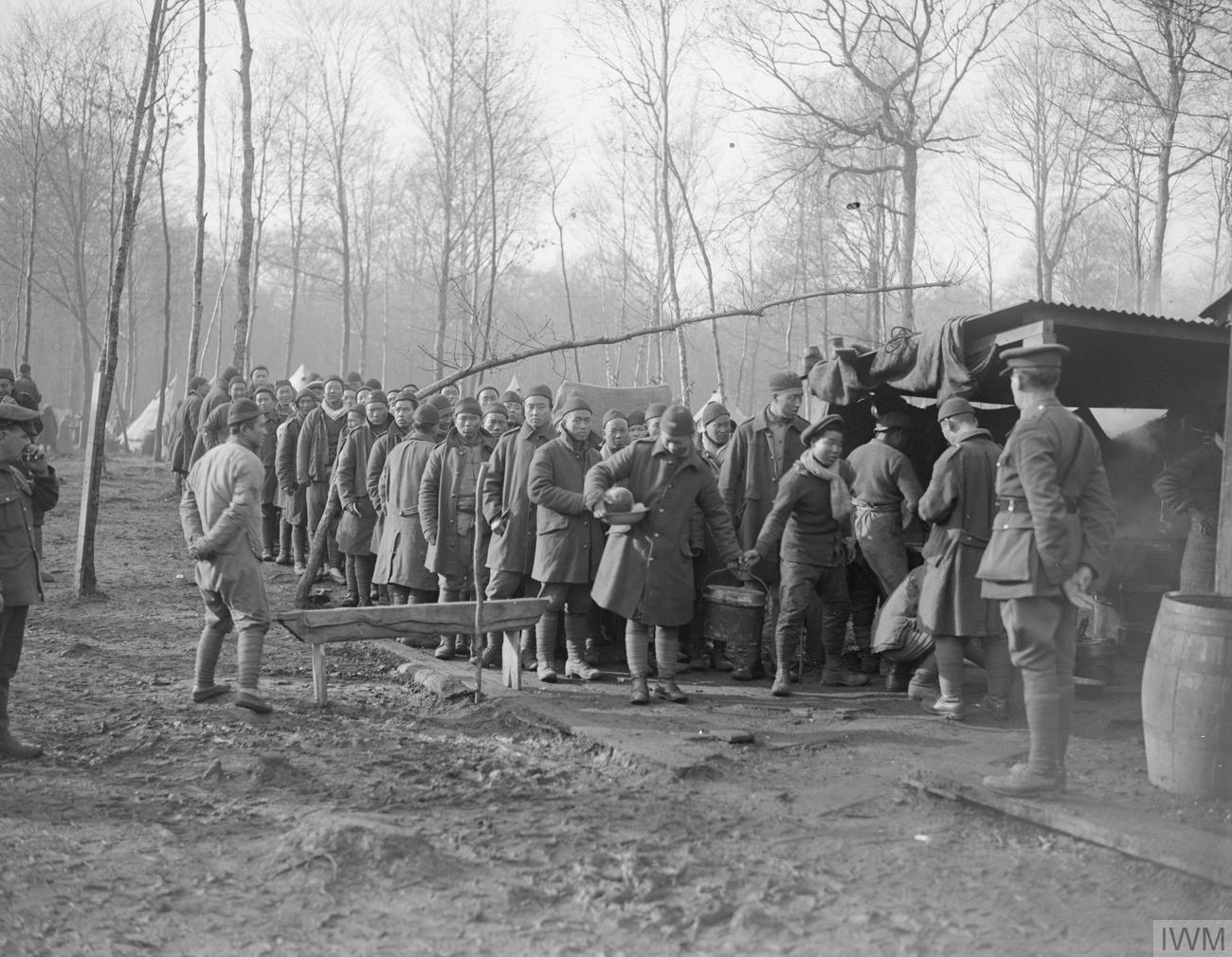
Men of the Chinese Labour Corps in France drawing rations, 1918.

Gray served in the British Army in the British Central Africa Protectorate from 1894 to 1898. He then served in British East Africa in 1899 and in Ashanti in 1900. He received a medal and clasp for each. He was the principal medical officer for the British Central Africa Administration from 1897 to 1902.

He was medical officer to the British ambassador in Peking from 1902 to 1926 and was also the medical superintendent to the British Charitable Hospital there (established 1901). He received the thanks of the Chinese government for his work during the plague epidemic of 1910–11, and was the British delegate to the International Plague Conference held in Mukden in 1911.

He served in the Royal Army Medical Corps during the First World War as commanding officer of the hospitals for the Chinese Labour Corps, located principally at Noyelles-sur-Mer, first as Major, and then as acting Lieutenant Colonel. He replaced Major Stafford Mouritz Cox. Under Gray's command, the hospital expanded from 300 to 1,040 beds within six months. It had a specialism in ophthalmology as the Chinese often suffered from diseases of the eye. Gray was described as sympathetic to the labourers and often cared for them after they had been mistreated by their superiors. He realised they were homesick and suggested that a small Chinese pagoda be built near the entrance to the hospital which was done and painted in bright colours. The camp and its hospital were demolished in 1919 and no remains of the site now exist.

In 1920, Gray was awarded the Order of Wen-Hu, 4th Class, by the president of the Republic of China. In 1922, he was the British delegate to the International Finance Commission for Administration of Maritime Customs Surtax for Famine Relief.

== Later life ==
In the 1925 Birthday Honours, Gray was appointed a Commander of The Most Excellent Order of the British Empire (CBE).

In retirement, he set out to write The Romance of the Soya Bean, but finding little romance in its story, changed the title to All about the Soya Bean, which was published in London in 1936. In the book, Gray extolled the benefits of soy products based on his experience in China and medical knowledge, and called for more research on the subject in Britain and the establishment of a body to promote the use of soy products.

== Death and legacy ==
Gray died on 12 September 1946. In 2022, a collection of 22 Chinese Shang dynasty oracle bones were offered for sale by a descendant of Gray. Antiques Trade Gazette speculated that George Gray may have obtained them from the archaeologist James Mellon Menzies, who had worked in China at the same time as Gray, and was later an officer with the Chinese Labour Corps in France.

== Publications ==
- All about the Soya Bean: In agriculture, industry and commerce. John Bale, Sons, and Danielsson, London, 1936.
