= Herbert Thomas Dobbin =

British Army general

Brigadier-General Herbert Thomas Dobbin CBE DSO
- Born: 27 May 1878
- Died: 9 September 1946 (aged 68); Budleigh Salterton, England
- Military career
- Allegiance: United Kingdom
- Branch: British Army
- Service years: 1899–1935
- Rank: Brigadier-General
- Commands: Duke of Cornwall's Light Infantry; Iraq Levies; 75th Brigade; 4th Army Military School; 1/8th (Ardwick) Battalion Manchester Regiment; 1/8th Battalion, Royal Warwickshire Regiment; 1/4th Battalion, Gloucestershire Regiment
- Conflicts: First World War
- Awards: Commander of the Order of the British Empire; Distinguished Service Order; Mentioned in Despatches (3); Officer of the Order of the Crown (Belgium); Croix de Guerre (Belgium); Croix de Guerre (France)

Brigadier-General Herbert Thomas Dobbin, CBE, DSO (27 May 1878 – 9 September 1946) was a British Army officer of the Duke of Cornwall's Light Infantry. He commanded a number of battalions during the First World War and in 1918 was appointed to command the 75th Brigade. After the war he became commandant of the Iraq Levies and Colonel Commandant of the Duke of Cornwall's Light Infantry.

== Early life ==
Herbert Thomas Dobbin was the son of Lieutenant-Colonel G. M. Dobbin and was born on 27 May 1878. He was educated at Bedford Modern School and was commissioned a second-lieutenant in the Duke of Cornwall's Light Infantry on 18 January 1899.

He was from 11 January 1908 seconded from his regiment to serve under the Colonial Office.

He saw active service in Africa, and from 1911 to 1913 was commander of the Gambia Company, part of the West African Frontier Force.

== First World War ==
As an experienced professional soldier, Dobbin was attached to a variety of regiments as battalion commander during the war. From 29 June to 6 September 1916 he commanded the 1/4th Battalion, Gloucestershire Regiment. From 7 September 1916 to 24 February 1917, he commanded the 1/8th Battalion, Royal Warwickshire Regiment. From 30 May 1917 to 11 July 1917 he commanded the 1/8th (Ardwick) Battalion of the Manchester Regiment at Havrincourt Wood, after which he was appointed the commander of the 4th Army Military School. He was appointed GOC of the 75th Infantry Brigade on 9 February 1918 and promoted to the temporary rank of brigadier general whilst so employed, taking over from Douglas Baird. He was its GOC during the German offensive at the First Battle of Bapaume during the following month.

Dobbin was awarded the Distinguished Service Order (DSO) in 1916 and was Mentioned in Despatches three times. He was also appointed an Officer of the Order of the Crown of Belgium.

== Post-war service ==
After the war Dobbin saw further service in West Africa before assuming command of the Iraq Levies in October 1922. This was a force of roughly brigade-strength drawn in large numbers from Iraq's non-Muslim population. In the 1925 Birthday Honours Dobbin was appointed a Commander of the Order of the British Empire (CBE) in recognition of his command of this force. In 1926 he returned to England and until 1930 served as Colonel-Commandant of the Duke of Cornwall's Light Infantry.

Herbert Dobbin retired from the army in 1935. He died at Budleigh Salterton, Devon, on 9 September 1946. He was unmarried.
