= Cecil J. Edmonds =

British political officer and administrator in Iraq

Cecil John Edmonds (26 October 1889 – 11 June 1979) was a British political officer who served with the British Expeditionary Forces in Mesopotamia and North Persia Force in north-western Persia and later in the civil administration of Iraq.

== Early life ==
Cecil was the son of Missionary Rev. Walter and Laura Edmond and was born and raised in Japan until the age of eight. He received an education at Bedford School and Christ's Hospital before going on to Pembroke College, Cambridge.

From 1935 to 1945, he was adviser to the Ministry of Interior in Iraq. Edmonds recorded down his observations and experiences as a political officer in Iraqi Kurdistan between 1920 and 1925 in his famous book Kurds, Turks, and Arabs: Politics, Travel and Research in North-Eastern Iraq, 1919-1925, which provides detailed notes on social and political conditions, personalities and local practices in the districts that he served.

Edmonds showed great interest in the various heterodox religious communities that he had encountered while serving in Kurdistan. Trained as an Orientalist, he had become acquainted with the Kurds when he served in the British administration of Iraq.

He was also regarded as a great authority on Luristan.

He was appointed an Officer of the Order of the British Empire (OBE) in the 1925 Birthday Honours while serving as an inspector with the Ministry of Interior in Iraq, and promoted to Commander of the Order (CBE) in the 1930 Birthday Honours. He was appointed a Companion of the Order of St Michael and St George (CMG) in the 1941 New Year Honours.

== Bibliography ==
- Cecil J. Edmonds, Kurds, Turks and Arabs: Politics, Travel and Research in North-Eastern Iraq, 1919-1925, London, 1957.
- Cecil John Edmonds (2010), East and West of Zagros, Brill Academic Publishers, OCLC 593346009, OL 25432016M
