= Ernest Coombs =

English cricketer and British Army officer

Personal information
- Full name: Ernest Edwin Coombs
- Born: 17 December 1875; Croydon, Surrey, England
- Died: 3 April 1960 (aged 84); Hove, Sussex, England
- Batting: Unknown
- Bowling: Unknown

Domestic team information
- Years: Team
- 1901/02–1918/19: Europeans

Career statistics
Competition	First-class
Matches	6
Runs scored	48
Batting average	14.00
100s/50s	–/–
Top score	14
Balls bowled	642
Wickets	19
Bowling average	14.73
5 wickets in innings	2
10 wickets in match	1
Best bowling	8/32
Catches/stumpings	2/–
- Source: ESPNcricinfo, 5 June 2022

Ernest Edwin Coombs OBE (17 December 1875 — 3 April 1960) was an English cricketer.

Coombs was born at Croydon in December 1875. He would spend much of his adult life in British India, where he played first-class cricket in the Bombay Presidency matches for the Europeans cricket team on six occasions between August 1901 and September 1918. Playing as a bowler, he took 19 wickets in his six matches an average of 14.73. He took the majority of his wickets in two matches; against the Parsees in 1903 he took five wickets, while against the same opposition in 1904 he took 11 wickets. Coombs was a part–time officer in the Indian Defence Force during the First World War, holding the rank of lieutenant in January 1919. By 1925, he was employed as a Superintendent of Government Printing and Stationery at Bombay. In recognition of his services, Coombs was made an Officer of the Order of the British Empire in the 1925 Birthday Honours. He later retired to England, where he died at Hove in April 1960.
