= Roger Wilson (rugby union, born 1870) =

England international rugby union player

Roger Wilson CIE
- Full name: Roger Parker Wilson
- Born: 13 May 1870 West Derby, Liverpool, Lancashire, England
- Died: 12 December 1943 (aged 73) Southport, Lancashire, England
- School: Liverpool College
- University: Liverpool Medical School
- Occupation: Surgeon

Rugby union career
- Position: Forward
International career
| Years | Team | Apps | (Points) |
| 1891 | England | 3 | (2) |

Roger Parker Wilson (13 May 1870 – 12 December 1943) was an English international rugby union player.

The son of a shipping merchant, Wilson was born and raised in Liverpool. He attended Liverpool College and later played rugby for Liverpool College Old Boys. A forward, Wilson was a Lancashire representative player and in 1891 was capped three times for England, which included a two–try performance in a win over Ireland at Lansdowne Road.

Wilson studied at Liverpool Medical School and became a lieutenant colonel with the Indian Medical Service. He served as surgeon-general of Bengal Province and was appointed a Companion of the Order of the Indian Empire (CIE) in the 1925 Birthday Honours. On his return to England, Wilson joined the board of a textile manufacturing firm in Manchester.

== See also ==
- List of England national rugby union players
