= William Anderson (Indian Army officer, born 1880) =

English cricketer and British Indian Army officer (1880–1958)

Personal information
- Full name: William Henniker Anderson
- Born: 17 April 1880; Rawalpindi, Punjab, British India
- Died: 4 April 1958 (aged 77); Maidenhead, Berkshire, England
- Batting: Unknown
- Bowling: Unknown

Domestic team information
- Years: Team
- 1912/13: Europeans

Career statistics
Competition	First-class
Matches	2
Runs scored	26
Batting average	8.66
100s/50s	–/–
Top score	14
Balls bowled	150
Wickets	2
Bowling average	44.50
5 wickets in innings	–
10 wickets in match	–
Best bowling	2/33
Catches/stumpings	1/–
- Source: Cricinfo, 6 November 2021

William Henniker Anderson CBE (17 April 1880 – 5 April 1958) was an English first-class cricketer and British Indian Army officer.

The son of John Faulkner Henniker Anderson, he was born in British India at Rawalpindi in April 1880. Anderson graduated from the Royal Military College, Sandhurst in August 1899 as a second lieutenant into the Royal Norfolk Regiment. By 1903, he had been transferred to the British Indian Army and in June of that year he was promoted to lieutenant, antedated to August 1900. He was promoted to captain in August 1908, at which point he was serving in the 33rd Queen Victoria's Own Light Cavalry. Anderson played first-class cricket while serving in India, making one appearance for the Europeans cricket team against the Parsees and another for J. G. Greig's personal eleven against the Hindus, with both matches being played in August 1912. He scored 26 runs across these matches, in addition to taking 2 wickets.

Anderson served in the First World War with the 33rd, earning promotion to temporary major in September 1915, which became permanent in September 1916. Following the war, he held the temporary rank of lieutenant colonel while holding a director of remounts in February 1919. He was promoted to colonel in April 1924, while the following year he made a Commander of the Order of the British Empire in the 1925 Birthday Honours. In June 1928, he was made a temporary brigadier, before retiring from active service in March 1930 and being granted the honorary rank of brigadier. Anderson died in England at Maidenhead in April 1958.
