= Charumathi Ramachandran =

Indian Carnatic music singer (born 1951)

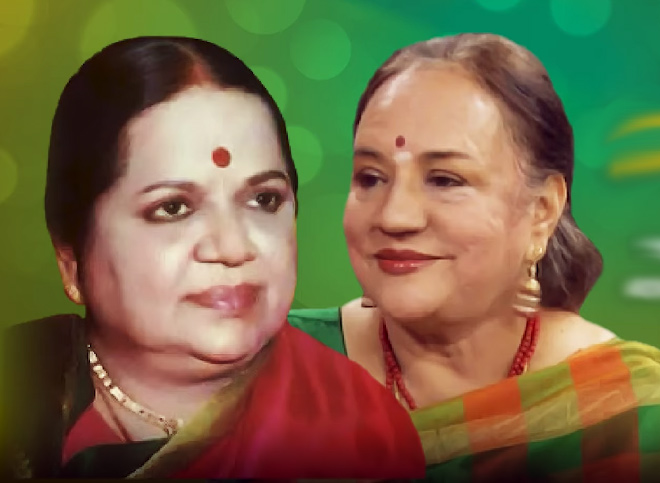
- A collage photo depicting M. L. Vasanthakumari (left) and Charumathi Ramachandran (right)
- Born: 12 July 1951 (age 75)
- Education: Queen Mary's College
- Occupation: Carnatic vocalist
- Spouse: Trichur V. Ramachandran

Charumathi Ramachandran (born 12 July 1951) is a Carnatic music singer. In 2019, Ramachandran received the Sangeet Natak Akademi Award for Carnatic vocal music.

She is a disciple of M.L. Vasanthakumari. She was a gold medalist and stood first in music from the Madras University. She was one of the first carnatic vocalists to introduce Hindustani forms in her music.

She is married to Trichur V. Ramachandran, who is also a Carnatic vocalist.
