= Dorothy de la Hey =

Dorothy Cisley Oldridge de la Hey (6 February 1884 – 18 November 1981) was an English educator who was one of the pioneers in women's education in India. She was the founder of Queen Mary's College in Madras, Madras Presidency in British India in 1914. It is the third oldest women's college in India.

She was born in Marple, Cheshire, the daughter of Rev. Edward Oldridge de la Hey and Esther Phoebe Hodgson.

She was 30 years old when she came to Madras to visit her brother, Clement de la Hey, Vice Principal of Newington College in Madras. She became the head of the college after consultation with then Governor of Madras Presidency Lord Pentland. It was called Madras College for Women, and was later renamed Queen Mary's College in 1917. Dorothy de la Hey had earned a master's degree in history from Oxford and did teacher training in St. Mary's College, Paddington. She was the principal until 1936, when she retired, and also taught in the college.

She was awarded the Kaisar-i-Hind Medal in the 1925 Birthday Honours, and a Bar to the Medal in the 1937 Coronation Honours.

She died in Cheltenham, Gloucestershire, aged 97.
