= Queen Mary's College, Chennai =

Government-run college in Chennai, India

Coordinates: 13.0451°N 80.2791°E

Queen Mary's College
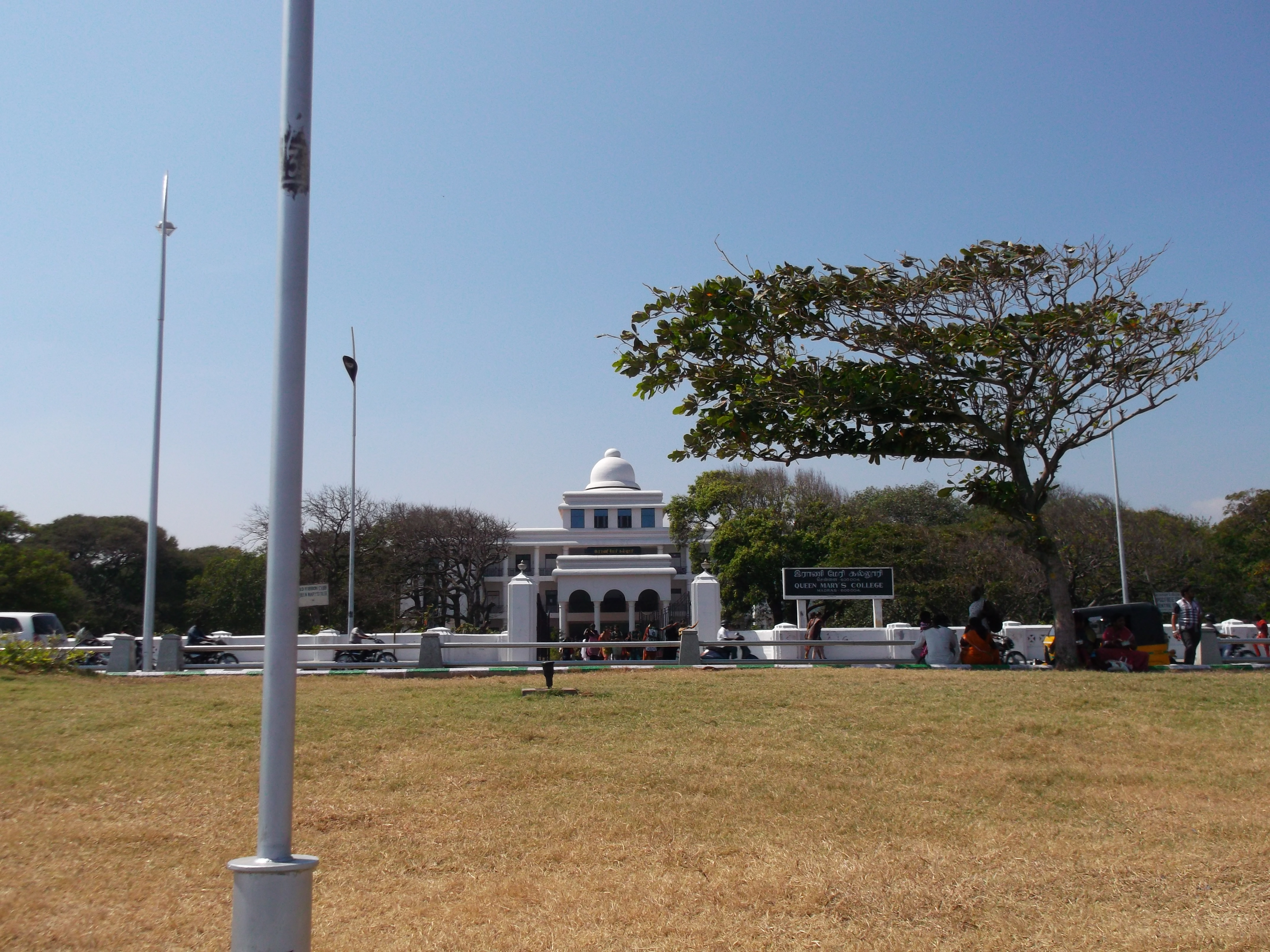
- Queen Mary's College entrance, as seen from Marina Beach
- Motto: “Common sense and consideration”
- Established: 14 July 1914; 112 years ago
- Founder: Dorothy de la Hey
- Affiliations: University of Madras
- Principal: B. Uma Maheswari
- Location: Chennai, Tamil Nadu, India
- Campus: Urban, 30 acres
- Website: queenmaryscollege.edu.in

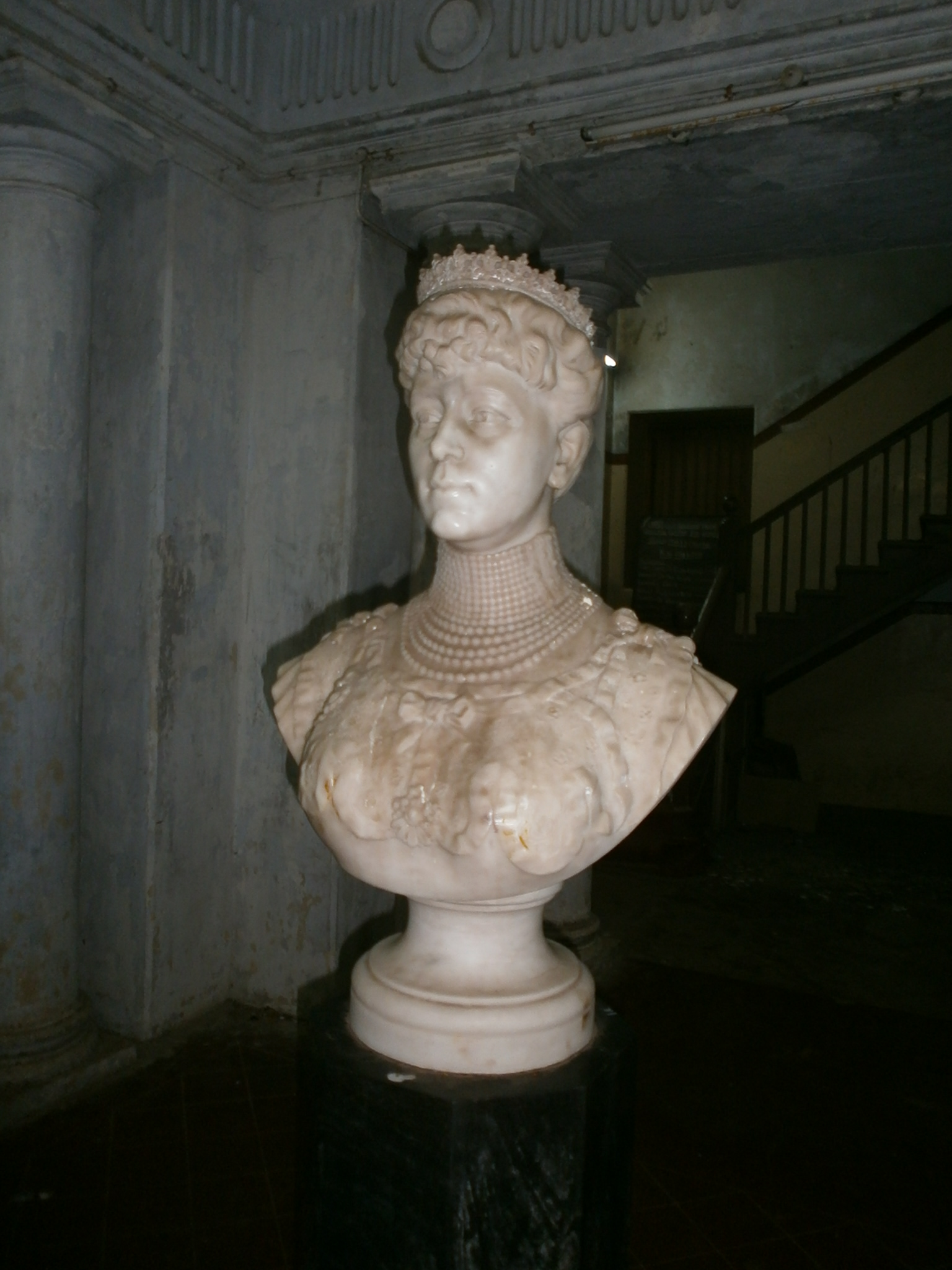
Bust of Queen Mary (by Nagappa), Queen Mary's College

Queen Mary's College is a government-run college in Chennai, Tamil Nadu, India. Established in 1914, it is the first women's college in the city and the third oldest women's college in India and second-oldest in South India after Sarah Tucker College. The college is located on junction of Kamarajar Salai and Dr. Radhakrishnan Salai facing the Marina Beach.

== History ==
It was founded by Dorothy de la Hey with the support of the Governor of Madras Presidency Lord Pentland in 1914 as Madras College for Women. It was later renamed as Queen Mary's College in 1917. The first three child widows to graduate from South India, Ammukutty, Lakshmi and Parvathy graduated from this college. Originally the residence of Lt Col Francis Capper in the mid-19th century, the building later housed a hotel before becoming a college in 1914. Known as the Capper House, the building was preserved as a heritage building. The college grew significantly under Dorothy de la Hey with many new buildings: Pentland House, Stone House and Jeypore House being built, and by 1923 Science subjects were also taught here. Physics and Chemistry laboratories were also built. In 1928, it was the first college in India to offer a two-year intermediate course in Indian music and in 1930 the music department was formally opened. By the time Dorothy de la Hey left in 1936 the college had grown significantly. Capper House was later demolished to construct a new administrative office for the college known as the Kalaignar Maaligai, which was inaugurated in July 2010. After her, Miss Myers became the Principal till 1946. The first Indian Principal was Nallamuthu Ramamurthi.

== Rankings ==
College rankings

General – India
- NIRF (Colleges) (2022): 47

The college is ranked 71st among colleges in India by the National Institutional Ranking Framework (NIRF) in 2024.

== Notable alumni ==
- Yashodhara Dasappa, politician, Padma Bhushan receipt
- Kamaladevi Chattopadhyay, freedom fighter, Padma Vibhusan recipient
- Indira Joseph Venniyoor, All India Radio broadcaster
- Janaki Ammal, scientist
- Lakshmi Sahgal, freedom fighter
- Charumathi Ramachandran, musician
- Nimi McConigley, first Indian American women to serve in any American State legislature
- Vani Jairam, musician
- Anuradha Sriram, musician
- M. Narmadha, musician
- A. Kanyakumari, musician
- R. Sivabhogam, first women chartered accountant in India
