= Madeleine Doran =

American literary critic (1905–1996)

Madeleine Kathryn Doran (August 12, 1905 – October 19, 1996) was an American literary critic and poet who taught at the University of Wisconsin–Madison from 1935 until her retirement in 1975. Born in Salt Lake City, Utah, Doran graduated from Stanford University with a B.A. in 1927. She received her M.A. from the University of Iowa in 1928, and her Ph.D. in 1930 from Stanford. She joined the English department at the University of Wisconsin in 1935, and was made a full professor in 1952.

Doran's work combined historical and formalist impulses. Her most famous work, Endeavors of Art, analyzed Medieval and Renaissance aesthetic treatises as a route to understanding the dramaturgy of Elizabethan playwrights. Endeavors of Art also helped define the relative weight and significance of classical, Italian, and English influences on the drama. The work, as Doran explains, "is an attempt to reconstruct some part of the context of ideas, assumptions, and predispositions about literary art in which Shakespeare and his fellow English dramatists, at the height of their country's Renaissance, must have worked, and to suggest ways in which these things may have helped shape their art."

Doran also published Shakespeare's Dramatic Language, a collection of critical essays, in 1976. She edited A Midsummer Night's Dream for Pelican Shakespeare and Thomas Heywood's If You Know Not Me, You Know Nobody for the Malone Society. An early monograph arguing that the difference between the quarto and folio versions of King Lear indicated authorial revision was largely unpersuasive when it appeared in the 1930s; however, the argument was taken up by later critics and has proved influential in recent critical and editorial practice.

Doran was also a poet. Her volumes are a collection of essays, Something About Swans (1973) and Time's Foot (1974); the latter volume won the Banta Award of the Wisconsin Library Association. She was elected a Fellow of the American Academy of Arts and Sciences in 1972.
