= Nallamuthu Ramamurthi =

Indian politician

Member of Parliament, Rajya Sabha
- In office 1956-1962
- Constituency: Madras State

Principal of Queen Mary's College, Chennai
- In office 1946-1950
- Preceded by: Miss Myers
- Succeeded by: M.Lakshmi Ammal

Personal details
- Born: 15 June 1896
- Died: 13 November 1972 (aged 76)
- Party: Indian National Congress

T Nallamuthu Ramamurthi was an Indian politician and academic. She was a Member of Parliament, representing Madras State in the Rajya Sabha the upper house of India's Parliament as a member of the Indian National Congress. She was the first Indian Principal of Queen Mary's College, Chennai in 1946 replacing Miss Myers.
