= Jules Ellenberger =

Jules Ellenberger (16 January 1871 – 20 August 1973) was an Imperial civil servant.

Ellenberger was born to an old South African pioneer family in a cave in what is now Lesotho. He was the son of D. F. Ellenberger of the Paris Mission Society mission in Lesotho, an Alsatian missionary and historian, and was educated at the Lovedale missionary school and in France.

Ellenberger held a variety of posts in the Bechuanaland Protectorate, as the equivalent of a district commissioner at Gaborone, Ngamiland, and Mafeking. He served as assistant commissioner of the Southern Protectorate from 1902 to 1916, government secretary from 1916 to 1923, and Resident Commissioner of the Bechuanaland Protectorate from 1923 to 1927, replacing his brother-in-law James MacGregor. He collected oral history of the BaTswana.

Ellenberger's son, Vivien Frederick Ellenberger (died 1977), also served in the Protectorate's civil service, and wrote on BaLete and BaTlokwa history.
