= Indira Joseph Venniyoor =

Indian radio broadcaster (died 2020)

- Born: Indira Poduval; 1925 or 1926; Travancore, British India
- Died: 29 December 2020 (aged 94); Poojappura, Kerala, India
- Education: Queen Mary's College
- Occupation: Radio broadcaster
- Spouse: E. M. J. Venniyoor (m. 1954; died 1984)
- Children: 3

Indira Joseph Venniyoor (born Indira Poduval; 1925/1926 – 29 December 2020) was an Indian radio broadcaster and Travancore Radio's first English-language news broadcaster. She was a broadcaster with All India Radio until her retirement in 1984.

== Early life ==
Venniyoor was born in the state of Travancore (in modern-day Kerala, India) into the Ambady house, a high caste Hindu family. Her father Vasudeva Poduval was a superintendent of archaeology with the state of Travancore and later the director of the archaeological museum. She moved with her family to Thiruvananthapuram at the age of 17. Recalling her childhood, she would later say that her family would host visitors like the Russian painter Svetoslav Roerich, American art historian Stella Kramrisch, and other English speakers at home, instilling in her a love for the language.

She graduated with a Bachelor of Arts in Economics degree with honours from Queen Mary's College in Madras (now Chennai).

== Career ==
Venniyoor (then Poduval) graduated around the time when C. P. Ramaswami Iyer, Dewan of the state of Travancore, was establishing Travancore Radio with a dedicated low-power broadcasting studio. She submitted her application to the then–chief minister of Travancore–Cochin, Paravoor T. K. Narayana Pillai, and was selected for the job. When the station started broadcasting in 1949, she began as the announcer, and was its first English-language news broadcaster. As per the proceedings in the then legislature of the State of Travancore and Cochin, she was paid 69 rupees (then equivalent to US$14.50) for her job as a news broadcaster in 1949. (Note: In 1949, 4.76 Indian rupees were equivalent to 1 United States dollar.) When Travancore Radio became a part of All India Radio (AIR) in Trivandrum on 1 April 1950, she went on to broadcast from the Bhakti Vilas palace, where the AIR station shifted to from its earlier location at the Vazhuthakatte MLA Quarters building.

Her signature starting note, "This is Trivandrum. You will now hear the news read by Indira Poduval", was a characteristic of her daily 7 pm radio broadcasts. With radio still out of reach from the homes of many of the common people, people would throng the Chandrasekharan Nair Stadium where the news would be broadcast on public speakers. She cited English broadcasters from All India Radio Delhi, Melville de Mellow, and Roshan Menon as her inspiration. She continued working with All India Radio until her retirement as a program executive in 1984.

She was a noted connoisseur of music and the performing arts, and was known to have encouraged emerging artists during her time at All India Radio.

== Personal life ==
Venniyoor met her future husband, art critic and author E. M. J. Venniyoor, when he was a program assistant at All India Radio when they produced the show Rasagolam together. They married in 1954 and had three sons. Recalling the marriage of an upper-caste Hindu to a Christian, she would say, "He was adept at English; and that's what drew us close." Her husband died in 1984 when he was a station director with All India Radio in Bombay.

Her sister was the Malayalam singer Santha P. Nair.

Venniyoor died on 29 December 2020 at her home in Poojappura, in the Indian state of Kerala, at the age of 94.
