= Caecilians of the Western Ghats =

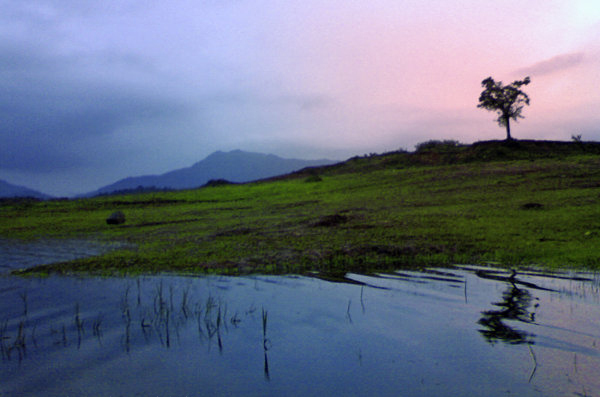
Karapuzha dam, Wayanad

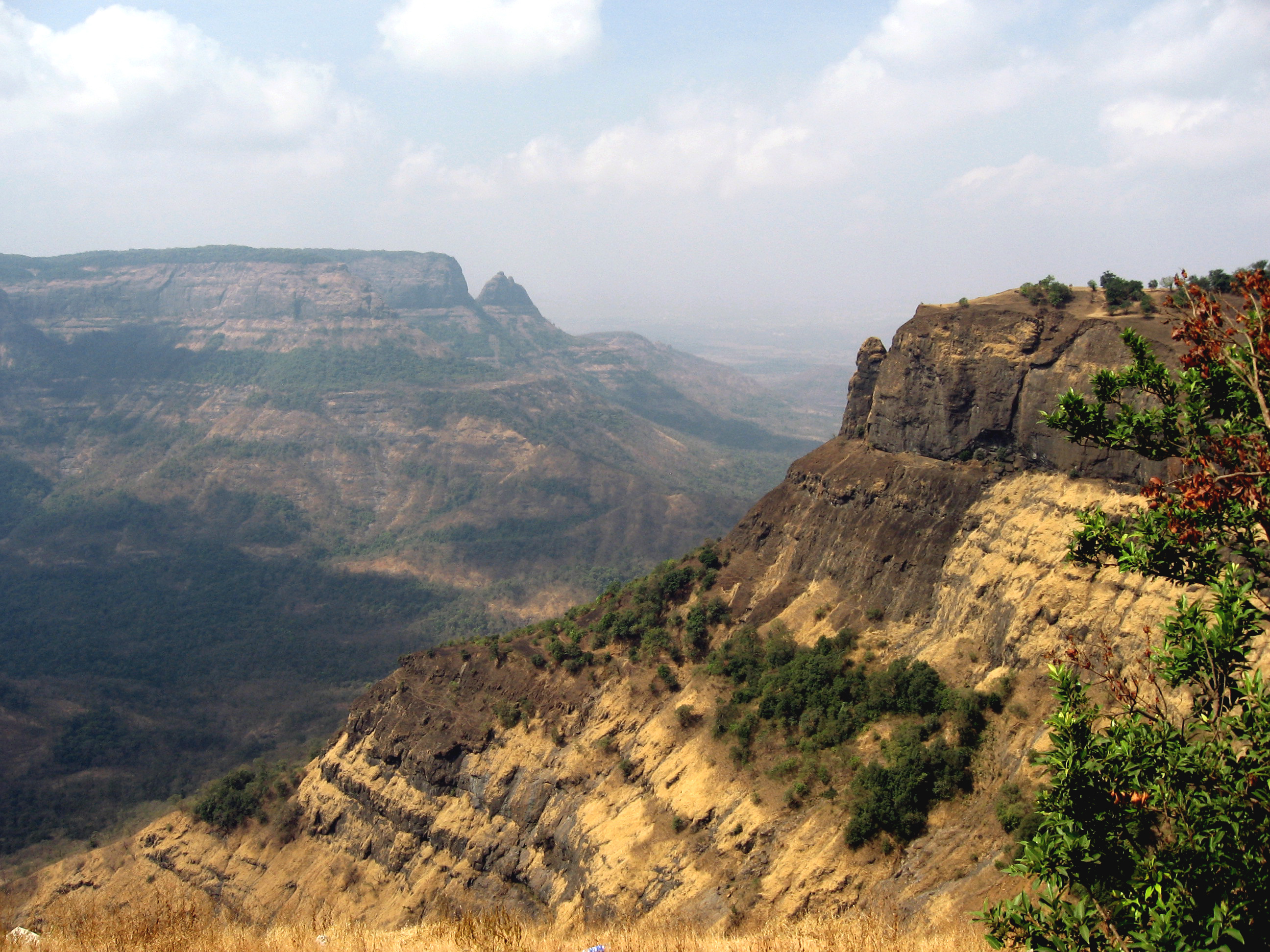
The Western Ghat hills at Matheran in Maharashtra, India

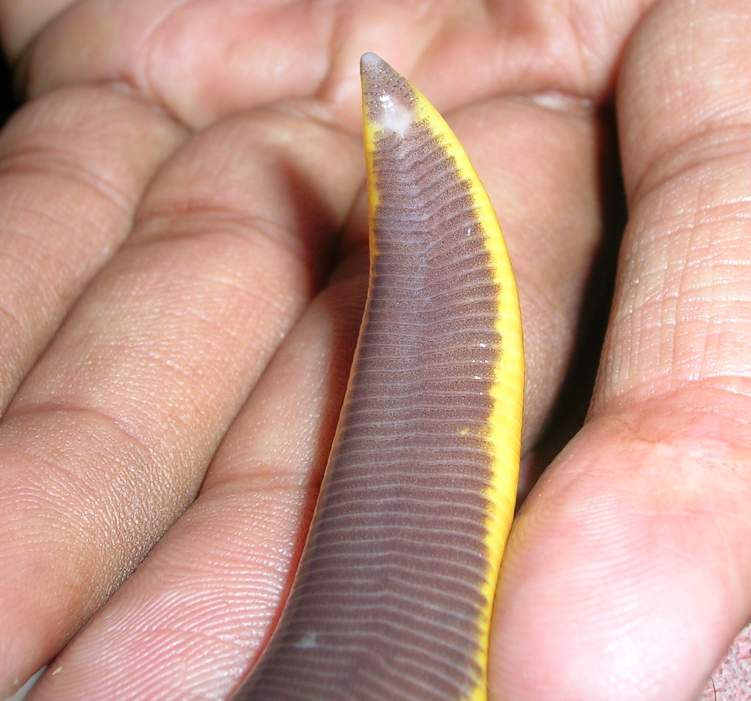
Caecilian from Wayanad district

The Western Ghats in India are home to several species of caecilians (Gymnophiona). Caecilians are legless, burrowing amphibians which mostly live in leaf litter, loose soil, under rocks and decaying logs. They are also found in agricultural fields and only surface during the monsoon. The body is elongated and smooth with a slimy skin. The smaller caecilians superficially resemble earthworms while the larger ones are often mistaken for snakes. However, they can be told apart from earthworms by the presence of eyes, teeth and skeleton and from snakes by the lack of scales on skin. The eyes in caecilians are not well developed which is most likely to be because of their burrowing life style. They are considered as rare which is apparently due to their subterranean habits. To see them one has to search carefully (usually by digging) and be at the right place and at the right time. There are few places where they are common, but, at least one species was reported to be abundant in agricultural fields in Kerala. The larger caecilians can resemble snakes, but their skin is smooth, not scaly.

== The Western Ghats Caecilians ==
The Western Ghats of India are one of the global biodiversity hotspots, and a centre of caecilian diversity. Of the 39 described species of Caecilians from India, 26 are endemic. From distributional records it is apparent that the hot spot of known caecilian diversity in India is the Western Ghats. Of the 26 currently recognized Western Ghats species, most are known from the southern part of the range, including seven species endemic to this area.

As far as is known, all Indian Caecilians are oviparous i.e. they lay eggs and have a free-living, aquatic larval stage except Gegeneophis seshachari. The smallest Indian caecilian is about 142 mm (5.6 in) in length (Gegeneophis krishni) and the longest is 545 mm (21.5 in) (Ichthyophis malabarensis). As per the available information, most caecilians are opportunistic feeders and feed on earthworms, termites, larvae and pupae of a variety of insects. The observation of the faeces of captive caecilians indicates that they may be detritivores i.e. feeding on dead and decomposed organic matter also.

Despite more than 100 years of research in the region, the number of recognised Caecilian species in the Western Ghats is still increasing rapidly. Most of the Western Ghats caecilians were previously described from the southern part of the peninsula. However, moderate recent effort expended in the herpetologically-under-explored northern region has uncovered several new species. The current picture of caecilian biology in the northern Western Ghats is well illustrated by recent discoveries. In the last 18 months, five new species have been described from northern Karnataka and Maharashtra. We know almost nothing of their biology and they are all deficient of data regarding their conservation status.

As per the recent reports about 31% of the amphibians of the world are on the verge of extinction. Many more species are yet to be discovered and if the situation remains the same then they will become extinct without our knowledge. These amphibians play a dual role in the food chain. They are predators which keep a check on the insect population and are also prey for a variety of other predators.

== Taxonomy ==
=== Family: Indotyphlidae ===
- Genus: Indotyphlus
  - Indotyphlus battersbyi
  - Indotyphlus maharashtraensis
- Genus: Gegeneophis
  - Gegeneophis danieli
  - Gegeneophis primus
  - Gegeneophis ramaswamii
  - Gegeneophis carnosus
  - Gegeneophis krishni Western Ghats (Gurpur in Karnataka)
  - Gegeneophis madhavorum Western Ghats (Udupi in Karnataka)
  - Gegeneophis nadkarnii Western Ghats (Goa)
  - Gegeneophis seshachari Ratnagiri, Maharashtra
  - Gegeneophis goaensis
  - Gegeneophis mhadeiensis
  - Gegeneophis tejaswini

=== Family: Ichthyophiidae ===
- Genus: Ichthyophis
  - Ichthyophis beddomei
  - Ichthyophis bombayensis
  - Ichthyophis davidi
  - Ichthyophis kodaguensis
  - Ichthyophis longicephalus
  - Ichthyophis tricolor
- Genus: Uraeotyphlus
  - Uraeotyphlus gansi
  - Uraeotyphlus interruptus Kerala, known from the type locality i.e. ‘Chengalam’ village.
  - Uraeotyphlus malabaricus
  - Uraeotyphlus narayani
  - Uraeotyphlus menoni
  - Uraeotyphlus oxyurus
  - Uraeotyphlus oommeni

== Resources ==
- American Museum of Natural History
- Amphibiaweb
- Amphibian Tree of Life
- A field guide to the caecilians of Western Ghats, India.pdf
