= South Indian Cultural Association, Hyderabad =

- Formation: 1959
- Headquarters: Hyderabad, India
- Key people: Dr. S.Chakravarthi, IAS (retd) President, R Chakrapani (Hony Secretary),
- Website: http://www.sicahyderabad.org/

South Indian Cultural Association or SICA is a non profit organization for carnatic music and dance. It is located in Hyderabad, India. The main function of the organisation is to organise cultural events mainly at Ravindra Bharathi.

Renowned Classical music and dance artists perform for SICA during their festival in February and March.

== History ==
SICA was established in 1959. SICA is celebrating its Golden Jubilee in 2009 and the year-long celebrations are concluding at the Bharatiya Vidya Bhavan, Hyderabad on 16 August 2009.

== List of Performers ==
The artists who performed for SICA over the years are: Mangalampalli Balamuralikrishna, Madurai T.N.Seshagopalan, Kadri Gopalanath, Urmila Satyanarayana, N. Ramani, Nedunuri Krishnamurthy, Hyderabad Brothers, Hyderabad Sisters, N.Ch.Parthasarathy, Vani Jayaram, G.J.R.Krishnan, Kartik Seshadri, Mandolin U.Srinivas, Shashank Subramanyam, Jayaprada Ramamurthy, P. Unnikrishnan, Priya Sisters, Sanjay Subramanian, Sudha Ragunathan, Nithyasree Mahadevan, Parvathi Ravi Ghantasala, Malladi Brothers, Veena Srinivas, Yamini Reddy, Pantula Rama

== Programme ==
=== Past Events ===
- 20 March 2011 - S. Shashank, Flute
- 21 March 2011 - Madurai T. N. Seshagopalan, Vocal
- 22 March 2011 - Sudha Ragunathan, Vocal

== See also ==
- SICA, Indore
