= Sica (disambiguation) =

A sica is an Illyrian, Thracian, Dacian, and Roman sword or dagger.

Sica may also refer to:

- Mario Sica (born 1936), Italian diplomat
- Jessica Jung (nicknamed "Sica") (born 1989), Korean-American singer
- Sica Ho (born 2000), Hong Kong singer

SICA may refer to:

- Central American Integration System (Spanish: Sistema de la Integración Centroamericana)
- Solomon Islands Christian Association
- South Indian Cultural Association, Hyderabad
- South Indian Cultural Association, Indore
- South Inter-Conference Association
- Subud International Cultural Association

== See also ==
- Sicarius (disambiguation)
