= Madras Music Academy =

Music school in Tamil Nadu, India

Coordinates: 13.045878°N 80.259494°E

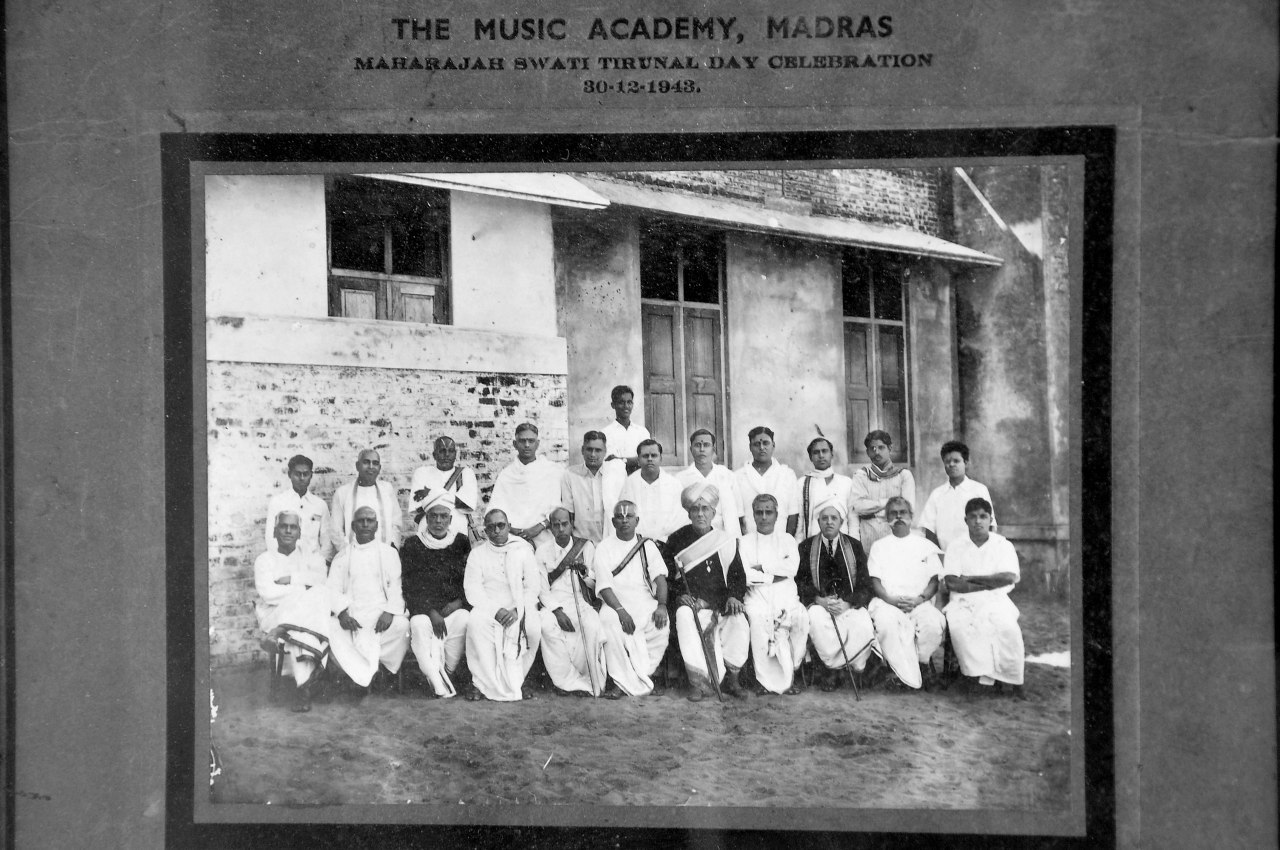
- Madras Music Academy in 1943
- Formation: August 18, 1928; 98 years ago
- Founder: E. Krishna Iyer; U. Rama Rao
- Purpose: Music, dance and arts education
- Headquarters: Alwarpet, Chennai 600 018, India

Madras Music Academy is one of the earliest established music academies in South India. Before the concept of infrastructure was introduced to India in the early 1920s, it was a gathering for elite musicians simply called (and is still more commonly referred to as) Music Academy (Tamil: சங்கீத வித்வத் சபை, sangeetha vidhwadh sabai) It plays an important role in encouraging and promoting primarily the Carnatic Music Indian art form. It played a vital role in the revival of the Indian classical dance form of Bharatnatyam in the 1930s when it faced near extinction due to a negative connotation caused by conservative societal standards.

They also run a music school called the Teachers college of Carnatic Music which has many eminent musicians on its faculty. Musicians such as Tiger Varadachariar, Appa Iyer, Valadi Krishnaiyer and Mudicondan Venkatarama Iyer adorned the chair of Principal of the Teacher's College.

== History ==
In 1927, the Indian National Congress held the All India Music Conference in Madras. At the end of the conference it was decided that an organisation be formed that helped the cause of music. The prime reason for this conference was E. Krishna Iyer who had played a vital role in reviving the south Indian dance art form—Bharatanatyam.

The academy was formally inaugurated on 18 August 1928 by C. P. Ramaswami Iyer, in the Y.M.I.A. Auditorium before a large and distinguished gathering. C. P.'s grandson C. V. Karthik Narayanan would later serve as Trustee.

Annual music conferences are held every December to collect all information regarding music, maintain the library and publish a journal. They also help to bring to public notice aspiring musicians and scholars by conducting competitions and other presentations.

For a decade, E. Krishna Iyer worked as the Secretary of the Madras Music Academy. The first Music Festival was held in December 1927 which is before the inauguration of the Music Academy. Since then, it had become a part of the Madras Music Academy's Activities to conduct several expositions and concerts on Carnatic Music every December. This later came to be popularly known as the Margazhi Season or is referred to as the Madras Music Season amongst Carnatic enthusiasts. This soon became the norm for all sabhas in Madras to conduct several concerts each day during the season. There were several sabhas before the formation of the Music Academy like the Parthasarathy Swami Sabha in Triplicane which was formed as early as 1900. However, it was the Madras Music Academy that set the trend of conducting the music festival during December.

Dr U. Rama Rao was the founder President of the academy and Basheer Ahmed Sayeed, the founder vice-president. The present President is N. Murali. The six past presidents are: Rama Rao, K. V. Krishnaswamy Iyer, T. L. Venkatarama Iyer, T. S. Rajam, K. R. Sundaram Iyer, and T. T. Vasu. Before the present building (T. T. Krishnamachari Auditorium) was constructed, the annual conferences and programmes were held in various locations around the city.

== The building ==
During the first few years, the academy conducted its activities provisionally in George Town and later moved to Mylapore. In 1955, Jawaharlal Nehru laid the foundation stone for the music academy building that exists today on TTK Road in Mylapore. It was inaugurated on 20 December 1962 by Jayachamarajendra Wadiyar, governor of Madras.

There are two buildings for the Music Academy:

1. The T. T. Krishnamachari Hall
2. The Kasturi Srinivasan Hall

The T. T. Krishnamachari Hall is the first building that was built in 1955. It has a seating capacity of 1600.

The Kasturi Srinivasan Hall was built in 1982. It houses a small auditorium for conferences and concerts, a library, a committee room and a recording and demonstration room. It was here that T. N. Rajarathnam Pillai's tapes and audio CDs were produced. Kasturi Srinivasan's nephew's son, N. Murali, the Joint Managing Director of The Hindu, is the current President of the academy.

== Awards, recognition and contributions ==
- Sangita Kalanidhi: The Music Academy has been recognising and rewarding people who contributed to the field of Carnatic music by honouring them with the title Sangita Kalanidhi since 1929. In 1968, M. S. Subbulakshmi was the first woman to receive the Sangeetha Kalanidhi.
- Sangita Kala Acharya: It was later in 1993 that the academy also started giving out the Sangita Kala Acharya title. It is awarded to 2 or 3 senior musicians every year.
- Nritya Kalanidhi: The Academy recognizes distinguished dancers through its annual dance title, originally conferred as the Natya Kala Acharya.The award was instituted in 2012 by Dr. Engikollai Krishnan and Dr. Leela Krishnan. It was established in memory of Smt. Meenakshi and Mysore Asthana Vidwan Engikollai Chidambara Ganapatigal. The honour is presented during the Academy's annual dance conference, held in the first week of January.
- Vaggeyyakkara Award
- Musicologist Award
- Spirit of Youth-festival of Dance and Music: During the October of every year nearly 40 young artists are projected by the academy for their Classical Music and Dance talent.
- Special TTK Award
- Special Life Time Achievement award: This award has been conferred on only 3 people:
  - Kumari Kamala
  - Lalgudi Jayaraman
  - T. H. Vinayakram
- Best Artiste Award
- Music Welfare
  - R. R.Talent Promotion Scheme: Two talented artists are selected by the academy and are sponsored for coaching under an eminent musician chosen by the academy. At the end of the training period the artists get to perform in the academy.
  - Teacher's College of Music is a school run by the academy for offering certified courses on vocal, violin and mridangam.
- Books: The academy conducts research on Music and publishes their findings. Some of the academy's publications:
  - The Ragas of Sangita Saramrta, a book written by King Tulaja I.
  - Lakshana Gitas
  - Raga Lakshanas

== Annual Concerts ==
The Music Academy has held annual concerts since 1927. No regular annual concerts were held from 2020 to 2022. Ticketed annual concerts performances were given by:

- 2026–Vasudha Ravi, Vivek Sadasivam, Aishwarya Vidhya Raghunath, Amritha Murali, Pantula Rama, Ashwath Narayanan, N. J. Nandini, T. N. S. Krishna, S. Sowmya, Bharat Sundar, Vidya Kalyanaraman, Sikkil Gurucharan, Shashank Subramanyam, Malladi Brothers, Abhishek Raghuram, G. J. R. Krishnan and Lalgudi Vijayalakshmi, Sriranjani Santhanagopalan, Ramana Balachandhran, K. Gayatri, Sandeep Narayan, Jayanthi Kumaresh, Ramakrishnan Murthy, Amrutha Venkatesh, Sanjay Subrahmanyan, Sudha Ragunathan, Kunnakudi M. Balamuralikrishna, J. A. Jayant, Vignesh Ishwar, A. Kanyakumari with Vittal Rangan, K. S. Vishnudev, Akkarai Sisters, Kalyanapuram S. Aravind
- 2025–J. B. Sruthi Sagar, Kalyanapuram S. Aravind, Nisha Rajagopalan, Ramana Balachandhran, Amritha Murali, Ashwath Narayanan, Aishwarya Vidhya Raghunath, T. N. S. Krishna, Pantula Rama, Bharat Sundar, K. Gayatri, Malladi Brothers, Vidya Kalyanaraman, J. A. Jayant, Sriranjani Santhanagopalan, G. J. R. Krishnan and Lalgudi Vijayalakshmi, Gayathri Venkataraghavan, Sandeep Narayan, S. Sowmya, Akkarai Sisters, Jayanthi Kumaresh, Ramakrishnan Murthy, Amrutha Venkatesh, Sanjay Subrahmanyan, Sudha Ragunathan, Kunnakudi M. Balamuralikrishna, Vignesh Ishwar, Abhishek Raghuram, A. Kanyakumari with L. Ramakrishnan, K. S. Vishnudev, N. J. Nandini, Sikkil Gurucharan
- 2024–S. Karthick, Vidya Kalyanaraman, Ashwath Narayanan, Aishwarya Vidhya Raghunath, Pantula Rama, T. N. S. Krishna, Vignesh Ishwar, Amritha Murali, G. Ravikiran, Mahathi, Malladi Brothers, S. Sowmya, Akkarai Sisters, K. Gayatri, Sanjay Subrahmanyan, Sumithra Vasudev, G. J. R. Krishnan and Lalgudi Vijayalakshmi, Shashank Subramanyam, Kunnakudi M. Balamuralikrishna, Sriranjani Santhanagopalan, Nisha Rajagopalan, Amrutha Venkatesh, Bharat Sundar, Jayanthi Kumaresh, Ramakrishnan Murthy, Savita Sreeram, J. A. Jayant, Sudha Ragunathan, Sikkil Gurucharan, A. Kanyakumari with Embar Kannan and Nishanth Chandran, Sandeep Narayan, J. B. Sruthi Sagar, Abhishek Raghuram
- 2023–Vidya Kalyanaraman, Sumithra Vasudev, Pantula Rama, Ashwath Narayanan, Sriranjani Santhanagopalan, Vignesh Ishwar, A. Kanyakumari and Embar Kannan, G. Ravikiran, Amritha Murali, Malladi Brothers, Bharat Sundar, Jayanthi Kumaresh, K. Gayatri, Abhishek Raghuram, S. Sowmya, G. J. R. Krishnan and Lalgudi Vijayalakshmi, Shashank Subramanyam, Kunnakudi M. Balamuralikrishna, Ranjani–Gayatri, Gayathri Venkataraghavan, Sandeep Narayan, Saketharaman, Nisha Rajagopalan, Sanjay Subrahmanyan, Vishakha Hari, J. B. Sruthi Sagar, Sudha Ragunathan, Sikkil Gurucharan, Amrutha Venkatesh, Ramakrishnan Murthy, Akkarai Sisters, Trichur Brothers
- 2019–Sangeetha Swaminathan, A. S. Murali, G. Ravikiran, Sumithra Vasudev, Gayathri Venkataraghavan, Kunnakudi M. Balamuralikrishna, Nisha Rajagopalan, Trichur Brothers, A. Kanyakumari and Embar Kannan, Prasanna Venkataraman, S. Sowmya, Ramakrishnan Murthy, Sudha Ragunathan, Pantula Rama, Bharat Sundar, G. J. R. Krishnan and Lalgudi Vijayalakshmi, Malladi Brothers, Sikkil Gurucharan, Ranjani–Gayatri, K. N. Renganatha Sharma, Aruna Sairam, Sandeep Narayan, Bombay Jayashri, Saketharaman, Amritha Murali, Sanjay Subrahmanyan, Amrutha Venkatesh, Abhishek Raghuram, K. Gayatri, Jayanthi Kumaresh, J. A. Jayant
- 2018–Vidya Kalyanaraman, Sangeetha Swaminathan, Bharat Sundar, Nisha Rajagopalan, S. Sowmya, Amritha Murali, Malladi Brothers, Sudha Ragunathan, A. Kanyakumari and Embar Kannan, Ranjani–Gayatri, Aruna Sairam, Sanjay Subrahmanyan, Bombay Jayashri, Amrutha Venkatesh, K. Gayatri, Sumithra Vasudev
- 2017–Bharat Sundar, Prasanna Venkataraman, Vidya Kalyanaraman, Sandeep Narayan, Nisha Rajagopalan, Pantula Rama, Sumithra Vasudev, Saketharaman, K. N. Renganatha Sharma, Bombay Jayashri, Sikkil Gurucharan, Gayathri Venkataraghavan, Sudha Ragunathan, Jayanthi Kumaresh, S. Sowmya, G. J. R. Krishnan and Lalgudi Vijayalakshmi, Malladi Brothers, Shashank Subramanyam, Ranjani–Gayatri, Amritha Murali, Aruna Sairam, N. Ravikiran, Amrutha Venkatesh, Sanjay Subrahmanyan, A. Kanyakumari and Embar Kannan, Ramakrishnan Murthy, Kunnakudi M. Balamuralikrishna, Vishakha Hari, K. Gayatri, Abhishek Raghuram, Gayathri Girish, Jayateerth Mevundi
- 2016–Prasanna Venkataraman, Sriram Parthasarathy, Amritha Murali, Sikkil Gurucharan, S. Sowmya, N. Ravikiran, Nisha Rajagopalan, Sandeep Narayan, Priya Sisters, K. N. Renganatha Sharma, Pantula Rama, Malladi Brothers, Sumithra Vasudev, Abhishek Raghuram, K. Gayatri, G. J. R. Krishnan and Lalgudi Vijayalakshmi, Savita Narasimhan, Sanjay Subrahmanyan, Ranjani–Gayatri, Shashank Subramanyam, Gayathri Venkataraghavan, Jayanthi Kumaresh, Bombay Jayashri, P. Unnikrishnan, Aruna Sairam, A. Kanyakumari and Embar Kannan, Amrutha Venkatesh, Ramakrishnan Murthy, Sudha Ragunathan, Kunnakudi M. Balamuralikrishna, Nithyasree Mahadevan, Ashwini Bhide-Deshpande
- 2015–Sumithra Vasudev, Sandeep Narayan, Nisha Rajagopalan, Ramakrishnan Murthy, Amritha Murali, Saketharaman, Nithyasree Mahadevan, Sikkil Gurucharan, S. Sowmya, N. Ravikiran, Vijayalakshmy Subramaniam, Hyderabad Brothers, Priya Sisters, Abhishek Raghuram, Pantula Rama, G. J. R. Krishnan and Lalgudi Vijayalakshmi, K. Gayatri, Malladi Brothers, Ranjani–Gayatri, Shashank Subramanyam, A. Kanyakumari and Embar Kannan, Jayanthi Kumaresh, Savita Narasimhan, Sanjay Subrahmanyan, Aruna Sairam, K. N. Renganatha Sharma, Subhashini Parthasarathy, Vishakha Hari, Sreevalsan J. Menon, Kunnakudi M. Balamuralikrishna, Gayathri Venkataraghavan, Venkatesh Kumar

== Dance Festival ==
The Music Academy has held an annual dance festival following the music season since 2007. Ticketed annual dance performances were given by:

- 2027–Urmila Satyanarayana, Kalakshetra Foundation, G. Narendra, Ratikant Mohapatra, Vaibhav Arekar, Shivamohanam, Rama Vaidyanathan, Anitha Guha, Neena Prasad, Shijith Nambiar and Parvathy Menon, Priyadarsini Govind, P. S. V. Natyasangham, Parshwanath Upadhye, Nrityagram
- 2026–Rama Vaidyanathan, Urmila Satyanarayana, Navia Natarajan, Monisa Nayak, Praveen Kumar, Sridevi Nrithyalaya, Priyadarsini Govind, Sharmila Biswas, G. Narendra, Jigyasa Giri, Shijith Nambiar and Parvathy Menon, Idagunji Mahaganapati Yakshagana Mandali, Vaibhav Arekar, Nrityagram
- 2025–Rama Vaidyanathan, Apsaras Dance Company, G. Narendra, Urmila Sathyanarayana, Navia Natarajan, Neena Prasad, Meenakshi Srinivasan, Vaibhav Arekar, Praveen Kumar, Jaikishore Mosalikanti, Shijith Nambiar and Parvathy Menon, Divya Goswami, Priyadarsini Govind, Nrityagram
- 2024–Mythili Prakash, Priya Murle and Roja Kannan, Meenakshi Srinivasan, Idagunji Mahaganapati Yakshagana Mandali, Narthaki Nataraj, Methil Devika, Malavika Sarukkai, Sujata Mohapatra, Rama Vaidyanathan, Nirupama Rajendra, Navia Natarajan, Geeta Chandran, G. Narendra, Nrityagram
- 2020–Renjith and Vijna, Madhavi Mudgal and Arushi Mudgal, Alarmel Valli, Dhananjayans, Rama Vaidyanathan, Apsaras Dance Company, Malavika Sarukkai, Gauri Diwakar, Narthaki Nataraj, Idagunji Mahaganapati Yakshagana Mandali, Praveen Kumar, Bijayini Satpathy, Priyadarshini Govind, Vaibhav Arekar
- 2019–Navia Natarajan, Kalakshetra Foundation, A. Lakshman, Methil Devika, Rama Vaidyanathan, Urmila Sathyanarayana, Mythili Prakash, Sujata Mohapatra, Malavika Sarukkai, Aditi Mangaldas, Praveen Kumar, Margi Kathakali School, Meenakshi Srinivasan, Nrityagram
- 2018–Shijith Nambiar and Parvathy Menon, Leela Samson, Praveen Kumar, Kalakshetra Foundation, Rama Vaidyanathan, Sujata Mohapatra, Alarmel Valli, Vidha Lal and Abhimanyu Lal, Malavika Sarukkai, Neena Prasad, Priyadarshini Govind, Amrita Lahiri, Vaibhav Arekar, Nrityagram

== Library ==
Music Academy received a donation of Rs. 1,00,000 from S. Visvanathan in memory of K. R. Sundaram Iyer for the improvement of library activities. The library is now named as K. R. Sundaram Iyer Memorial Library. It has rare books, manuscripts and tape recordings of the proceedings of the Expert Committee sessions. The students of the Teacher's College of Music, members, music students and research scholars. Books on both music and other general subjects donated by the families of P. Sambamoorthy, Sangita Vidvan K. C. Thyagarajan, V. Raghavan, Venkatakrishnan, S. R. Janakiraman and other individuals.

== See also ==
- Eastern Fare Music Foundation
- Sangeet Natak Akademi
