= K. Ramunni Menon =

Indian educator

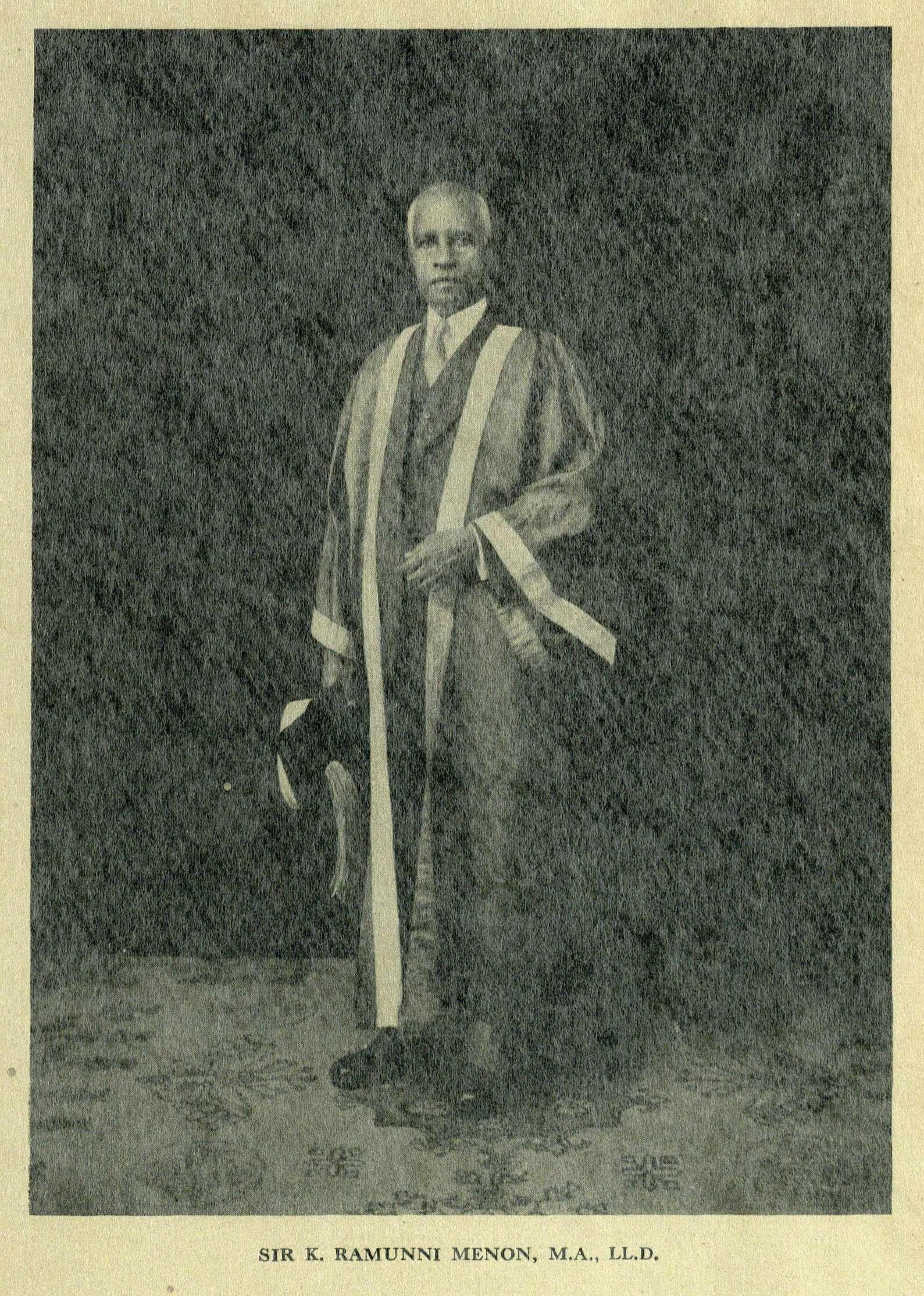

Sir Konkoth Ramunni Menon (14 September 1872 – c. February 1949) was an Indian educator who was the vice chancellor of the University of Madras from 1928 to 1934.

== Biography ==
Menon received a B.A from the University of Madras and proceeded to England for higher study to Christ's College, Cambridge.

He obtained first class honours in both parts of the Natural Sciences Tripos and returned to India after obtaining his M.A.

In 1910 he became professor of zoology at the Presidency College, Madras. The Department of Zoology of University of Madras was established in 1927 and Menon was made its honorary director after he became the vice chancellor of the University of Madras in 1928.

He was knighted in the 1933 New Year Honours list and invested with his knighthood on 3 March 1933 by the Viceroy, the Earl of Willingdon, at New Delhi. He served as the vice chancellor until 1934. During his time he first introduced music as a subject at Madras University.

== Legacy ==
Menon was invited to preside over the annual Music Academy's Sadas in 1944 and was also one of the founding fathers of the Tamil Isai Sangam. He is also the maternal grandfather of musicologist Indira Menon.

He first proposed in a letter to G. H. Hardy dated 28 July 1920 to pay Ramanujan's wife a monthly annuity of 20 rupees per month for handing over her husband's documents.

A species of amphibian, Menon's caecilian (Uraeotyphlus menoni), is named for him.
