= Justice Basheer Ahmed Sayeed College for Women =

College in India

Justice Basheer Ahmed Sayeed College For Women
- Former names: S.I.E.T
- Type: Autonomous
- Established: 1951
- Affiliations: University of Madras
- Chairman: Mrs. Bader Sayeed
- Principal: Dr. Amthul Azeez
- Students: 7000
- Location: Chennai, Tamil Nadu, India; 13.03601740277124°N 80.24776276483249°E
- Website: www.jbascollege.edu.in

The Justice Basheer Ahmed Sayeed College for Women (formerly known as the S.I.E.T Women's College) was established in 1955 with the aim of imparting higher education to women. The institution is maintained by the Southern India Education Trust and was founded by Justice Basheer Ahmed Sayeed.

== History ==
Justice Basheer Ahmed Sayeed (20 February 1900 - 7 February 1984) was a lawyer who later became a Judge at the Madras High Court in 1959. He believed that the best possible service to society was to equip women students from economically and socially backward communities with education of the highest quality. This resulted in the establishment of S.I.E.T. Women's College. In 1951, he was instrumental in establishing the Boys' College, now known as ‘The New College’.

== Academics ==
The college offers undergraduate courses in Historical Studies, Political Science, Corporate Economics, English Literature, Mathematics, Physics, Chemistry, Plant Biology and Plant Biotechnology, Zoology, Advanced Zoology & Biotechnology, Nutrition, F.S.M. & Dietetics, Clinical Nutrition & Dietetics, Interior Design & Décor, Psychology, Biochemistry General, Biochemistry with Vocational Biotechnology, B.Com(general), B.Com(CS), B.Com. (Honours), Information System Management, Tourism & Travel Management, Statistics, Microbiology, Computer Science, B.C.A., Electronics and Communication Science and B.B.A.

The college offers postgraduate courses in English Literature, Counselling and Guidance / Advanced Organizational Behaviour (C&G /AOB), Applied Psychology, Zoology, Home Science, Textile Science and Fashion Designing, Child Development & Essentials of Nutrition, M.Com., Corporate Economics, Applied Microbiology, Mathematics, Computer Science, M.C.A., M.Com(CS) and Physics. There are also M.Phil. courses in Applied Psychology (Sp. Student Counselling), Home Science, Textiles and Clothing, Human Development and Family Studies, Commerce, Zoology and Corporate Secretaryship, and Ph.D. courses in Psychology (Inter-disciplinary Research), Zoology- Environmental Sciences, Aquatic Biology & Physiology, Environmental Biotechnology and Human Science.

== Notable alumni ==
- Daggubati Purandeswari, former Union Minister of State for Commerce and Industry
- Bhuvana Natarajan, translator and short story writer
- Sivasankari
- Uma Ramanan, playback singer
- Riythvika, film actress
- V. J. Chitra Tamil television actress
