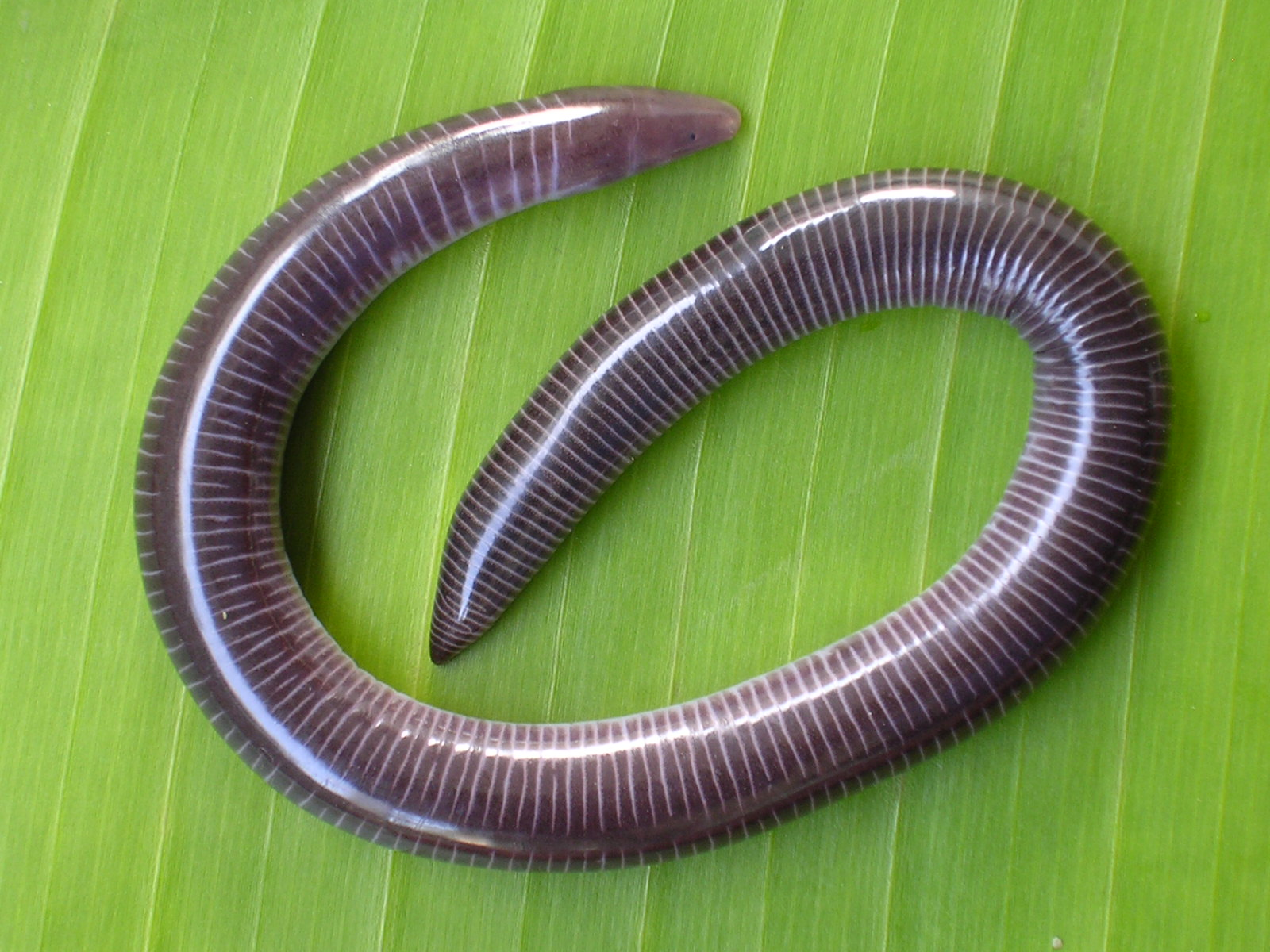
- Uraeotyphlus narayani

Scientific classification
- Kingdom: Animalia
- Phylum: Chordata
- Class: Amphibia
- Order: Gymnophiona
- Clade: Apoda
- Family: Ichthyophiidae
- Genus: Uraeotyphlus; W. Peters, 1879

Species
- Uraeotyphlus gansi Uraeotyphlus interruptus Uraeotyphlus malabaricus Uraeotyphlus menoni Uraeotyphlus narayani Uraeotyphlus oommeni Uraeotyphlus oxyurus

= Uraeotyphlus =

Genus of amphibians

Uraeotyphlus is a genus of caecilians in the family Ichthyophiidae. There are seven species in this genus, all of which are endemic to the Western Ghats of southwestern India. Previously, the genus has also been placed in its own monotypic family Uraeotyphlidae.

== Description ==
Uraeotyphlus are relatively small sized caecilians ranging from 23 centimetres (9.1 in) to 35 centimetres (14 in) in length. Unlike the more 'advanced' caecilians, members of this genus have a true tail with vertebrae, and their skull has a relatively complex structure. However, unlike the more 'primitive' caecilians, the mouth is recessed below the snout, there are no tertiary annuli, and the tentacular opening are far forward of the eyes, and below the nostril.

The pattern of annulation among species of Uraeotyphlus falls into two clear types based on the differentiation of primary and higher-order annuli, and the number of annular divisions per vertebra and whether this varies along the body. This difference is reflected in the recognition of U. oxyurus group (U. interruptus, U. menoni, U. narayani, U. oxyurus) and the U. malabaricus group (U. malabaricus and U. oommeni).

== Ecology and reproduction ==
They are burrowing animals, which lay eggs that hatch into free-living larvae.

== Species ==
The genus contains seven species:

- Uraeotyphlus gansi Gower, Rajendran, Nussbaum, and Wilkinson, 2008
- Uraeotyphlus interruptus Pillai and Ravichandran, 1999
- Uraeotyphlus malabaricus (Beddome, 1870)
- Uraeotyphlus menoni Annandale, 1913
- Uraeotyphlus narayani Seshachar, 1939
- Uraeotyphlus oommeni Gower and Wilkinson, 2007
- Uraeotyphlus oxyurus (Duméril and Bibron, 1841)
