= Embar Kannan =

Indian musician

Kalaimamani Embar S. Kannan
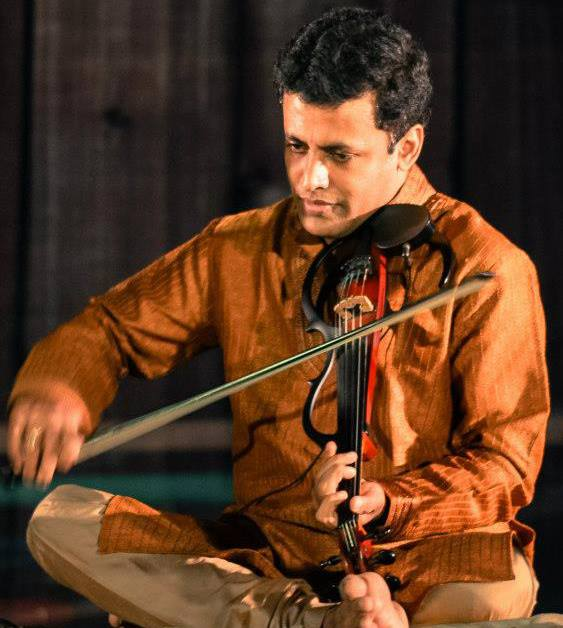
- Born: 19 February 1975 (age 51)

Embar S. Kannan is a violinist in the fields of Carnatic Music and Tamil Film Music. Trained in Carnatic as well as Western Classical methods, he is a Grade 'A top' artist of the All India Radio and is universally acclaimed as a soloist and an accompanist.

== Carnatic music career ==
Born in a family of great musicians to Sangeetha Bhooshanam Sri Embar Sadagopan, Kannan took to playing the violin at the age of six. His initial training in Carnatic music was with Sri Subbanna Bhagavathar and Sri Vittal Ramamurthy. In 1986 he received a talent scholarship from the Government of India and earned a place under the mentorship of Kum.A. Kanyakumari. Shortly thereafter he received the Yuva Kala Bharathi from Bharat Kalachar and the ‘Best Violinist Award’ from the Madras Music Academy for eight consecutive years. Over the course of his Carnatic career he has accompanied many leading artists such as T. V. Sankaranarayanan, Trichur Ramachandran, T. N. Seshagopalan, Sudha Raghunathan, Kadri Gopalnath, P. Unnikrishnan, Bombay Jayashree and S. Sowmya. One of Kannan's prodigal accomplishments was the introduction of the silent violin to Carnatic Music in 2001. In August 2006, he played the silent violin at Puttaparthi in the presence of Bhagawan Sri Satya Sai Baba with the musicians of the HeArtBeat Ensemble.

On 14 July 2011, he played at a concert that was organised to raise funds for the Sankalp Trust, the open school and learning centre for special children, at the Mutha Venkata Subba Rao Concert Hall.

== Film music career ==
Kannan received his Western Classical training from acclaimed music director, Diwaker master. Under him, Kannan entered the film industry with the movie Puli Pettra Pillai. Subsequently, he made himself an integral part of Maestro Ilaiyaraja's orchestra and with them, has played in numerous films and concerts around the world. In addition, he has played for other music directors; notably, Karthik Raja, Yuvan Shankar Raja, Vidyasagar, Sharath, A. R. Rahman and Deva.

== Awards ==
- Kalaimamani Award - 2007
- Received the Yuva Kala Bharathi from Bharat Kalachar.
- Received ‘Best Violinist Award’ from the Madras Music Academy.
