= Prema Ramamurthy =

Indian classical musician (born 1949)

- Born: 28 August 1949 (age 76); Ballari, Karnataka, India
- Occupation: Indian Carnatic Singer
- Spouse: Venkataramana Ramamurthy
- Children: 2, including Srinivas, Jayaprada Ramamurthy
- Parents: Nagaraj Sastry (father); Jayalakshmi (mother)
- Awards: Sangeet Natak Akademi Award (2020)
- Musical career
- Genres: Indian classical music
- Instrument: Vocals

Prema Ramamurthy is an Indian Carnatic vocalist from Karnataka. In addition to solo performances, she has also composed music for art tele-films, devotional albums, thematic productions and documentary films. She received the Sangeet Natak Akademi Award for the year 2020.

== Biography ==
Prema Ramamurthy was born on 28 August 1949, to Nagaraj Sastry and Jayalakshmi in Ballari, Karnataka.

She started learning Carnatic music at the age of three from her parents and grandfather Srinivasa Sastry. She is the senior most disciple of Padmavibhushan Sangita Kalanidhi M. Balamuralikrishna.

She specialised in Pallavi singing from T. V. Gopalakrishnan and trained in Padams and Javalis in Carnatic music from T. Muktha. and from Muktha.

=== Personal life ===
As of 2020, Prema is settled in Hyderabad, Telangana. Her daughter Dr.Jayaprada Ramamurthy is a renowned flautist.

== Career ==
Prema Ramamurthy has performed in various venues within and outside India including major festivals within the country and abroad. She has traveled to over 60 countries for festivals conducted by ICCR, Avignon, Theatre Dela Ville, Tropical Hall Amsterdam etc. She was one of the first artists to be invited to 2nd World Telugu Conference at Malaysia, and one of the first musicians to visit South Africa after Apartheid. She has composed music for art tele-films, devotional albums, thematic productions and national award-winning documentary films produced by the Films Division of India. She is one of the first Indian composers to be selected for the New York Rockefeller Foundation Award. She is an 'A Top Grade artiste' of All India Radio and Doordarshan and has performed for Akashvani Sangeet Sammelan, National Program of Music, South Indian Hook Up Concert, DD Bharati etc. She has performed for many media concerts including Tirumala Nadaneerajanam, Tiruvayaru Tyagaraja Utsavam, Etv, Ntv, Tv9, Tv5 etc.

== Awards and honors ==
Prema Ramamurthy received many awards & titles including 'Lifetime Achievement Award' from the Government of Telangana, Ugadi Puraskar, and the Sangeet Saraswati by the Madurai Sadguru Sangit Sabha. She received the Sangeet Natak Akademi Award for the year 2020, and New York Rockefeller Foundation Award 2020.
