= Sicarius =

The Sicarii were a group of Jewish assassins who were active throughout Judaea in the years leading up to and during the First Jewish–Roman War.

Sicarius, sicarii, or sicari may also refer to:

- Sicarii (1989), a Jewish terrorist group
- Sikrikim, a Haredi Jewish organization
- Sicaricon, a Jewish property law
- Saint Sicarius, name of several Christian saints
  - Sicarius of Brantôme, Christian child saint
- Sicarius (spider), a genus of recluse spiders in the family Sicariidae
- Vincenza Sicari (born 1979), Italian long-distance runner

== See also ==
- Sica (disambiguation)
- Sicario (disambiguation)
