= T. R. Subramaniam =

Vocalist in the Carnatic tradition

Professor T. R. Subramaniam (20 September 1929 – 4 October 2013), popularly known as TRS, was a vocalist in the Carnatic tradition. He was popular for infusing unconventional and populistic techniques in his renditions, especially of the pallavi, without compromising on the classicism of the rendition. Famous for his willingness to explore new avenues regardless of whether they would be accepted or not, TRS' concerts were much sought after. He was also much loved as a teacher. He received a double doctorate in music.

== Early days and education ==
TRS was born into a large middle-class family. He had seven sisters and two brothers. His father, Rajagopala Iyer, was employed with Indian Mutual Life Insurance Ltd. and was often transferred. Being someone who had a deep affection for Carnatic music, he often hosted musicians at his residence. Stalwarts like Madurai Mani, Semmangudi and Ariyakudi graced their residence and benefitted from their warm and affectionate hospitality. Owing to their father's transferable job, the children received their schooling in several towns like Mayavaram, Kumbakonam and Tirunelveli. At Mayavaram TRS learnt from Sivarama Iyer, a disciple of Poochi Srinivasa Iyengar. At Tirunelveli, his teachers were A.D. Rajagopala Iyer and Perungulam 'Gavai' Seetarama Bhagavatar. His elder sister Radha also studied at home.

When he was about 19 years old, TRS won the first place in a singing competition at the Madras Music Academy with an unusual style. He presented a pallavi to the judges, and said that he could sing it in any raga and tala. The judges asked him to sing it in the raga Mukhari set to the very complex Sankeerna nadai tala. He sang it flawlessly, and was awarded the first place.

TRS was a polyglot. His proficiency in Telugu was useful while singing kritis composed by Tyagaraja. He died of a heart attack on 4 October 2013, aged 84.

== Awards ==
Sangita Kala Acharya, from the Madras Music Academy
