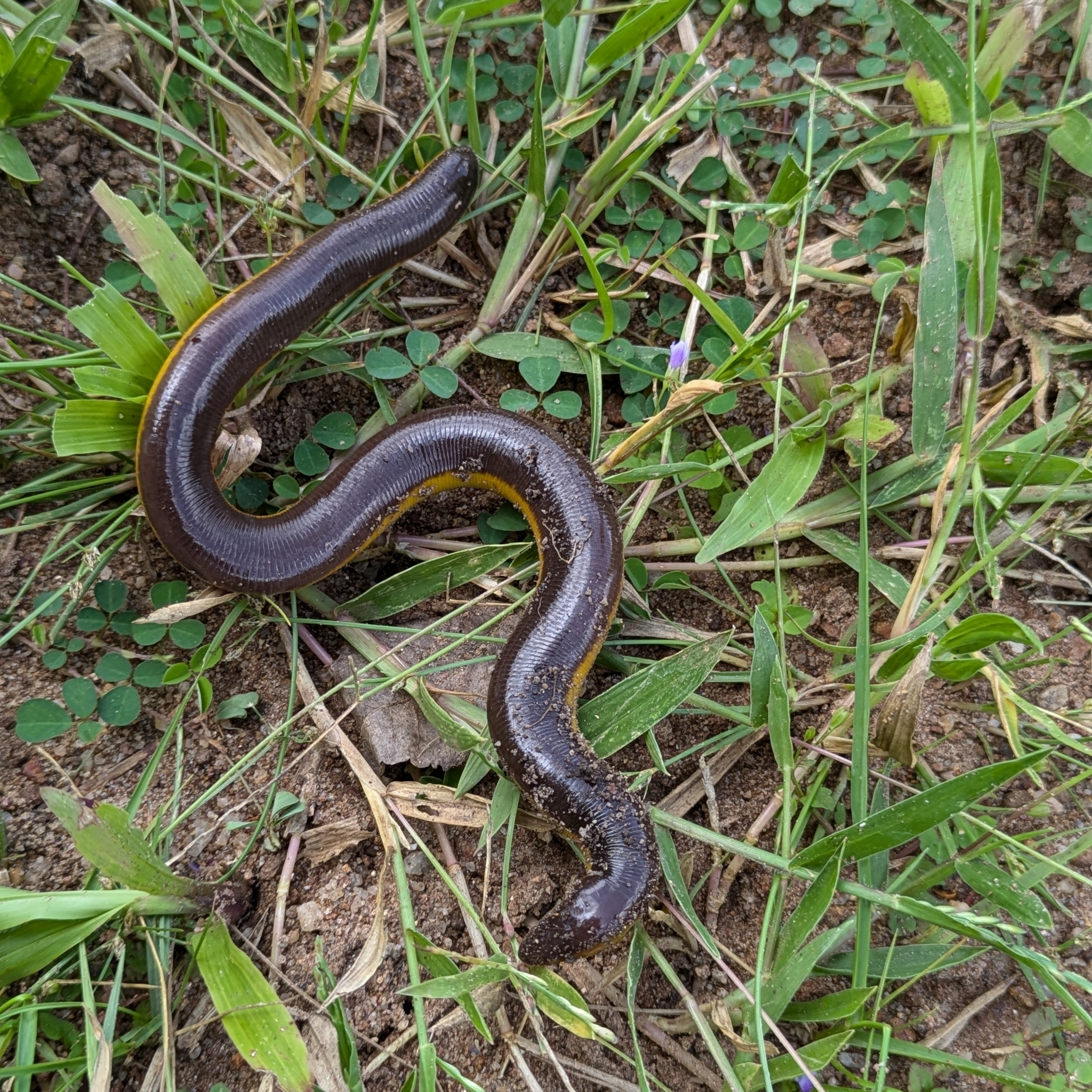

Conservation status
- Least Concern (IUCN 3.1)

Scientific classification
- Kingdom: Animalia
- Phylum: Chordata
- Class: Amphibia
- Order: Gymnophiona
- Clade: Apoda
- Family: Ichthyophiidae
- Genus: Ichthyophis
- Species: I. tricolor

Binomial name
- Ichthyophis tricolor Annandale, 1909
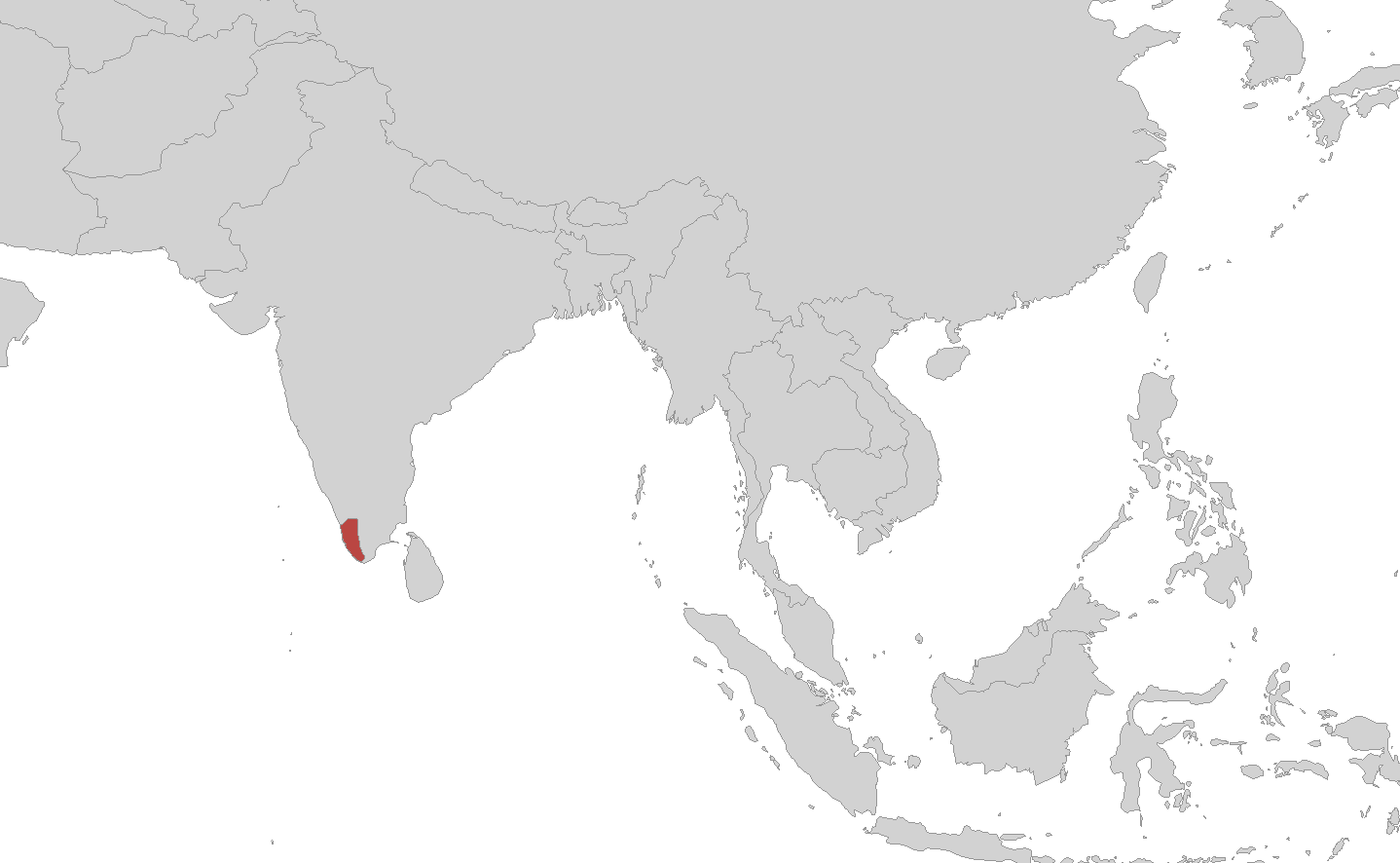
- Three-colored caecilian range

Synonyms
- Ichthyophis glutinosus tricolor Annandale, 1909

= Ichthyophis tricolor =

Species of amphibian

Ichthyophis tricolor, the three-colored caecilian or Maddatorai caecilian, is an amphibian endemic to the Western Ghats, India. Its taxonomic status is unclear, including its relationship with Ichthyophis beddomei and the possibility of cryptic species.

== Description ==
Adult measure 226–330 mm (8.9–13.0 in) in total length, including the 3–6 mm (0.12–0.24 in) long tail. Its body is violet-brown, with a yellow lateral stripe from the lips to the tip of the tail, slightly wider and unbroken at the neck. A broad, white ventral stripe is present. Its snout is slightly projecting, the eyes are distinct, and the tentacles are placed closer to the eye at the edge of the upper lip.

== Habitat and conservation ==
Ichthyophis tricolor is a subterranean species associated with wet, semi-evergreen tropical forests, but also agricultural areas and rubber plantations. It occurs from near sea level up to 1,200 m (3,900 ft) asl. It is an oviparous species with terrestrial eggs and aquatic larvae.

Ichthyophis tricolor is not uncommon in parts of its range. It is an adaptable species that occurs in several protected areas.
