= Uraeotyphlus oommeni =

Conservation status
- Data Deficient (IUCN 3.1)

Scientific classification
- Kingdom: Animalia
- Phylum: Chordata
- Class: Amphibia
- Order: Gymnophiona
- Clade: Apoda
- Family: Ichthyophiidae
- Genus: Uraeotyphlus
- Species: U. oommeni

Binomial name
- Uraeotyphlus oommeni Gower and Wilkinson, 2007

Species of amphibian

Uraeotyphlus oommeni, sometimes known as the Oommen's caecilian, Oommen's Uraeotyphlus, or Bonnacord caecilian, is a species of caecilian in the family Ichthyophiidae. Within Uraeotyphlus, it belongs to the U. malabaricus group showing no obvious external differentiation between primary and higher-order annuli. This species is endemic to the Western Ghats and only known from its type locality, Bonaccord, Thiruvananthapuram district, southern Kerala. Very little is known about this species known only from a single specimen collected from an imprecise location.

== Etymology ==
The specific name oommeni honours Oommen V. Oommen, professor of zoology at the University of Kerala.

== Description ==
The holotype is a mature female measuring 164 mm (6.5 in) in total length and 7 mm (0.3 in) wide at mid-body. There are 207 (left side) and 214 (right side) annuli, without clear external differentiation between primary and higher-order annuli. The body is strongly dorsoventrally compressed. The head is small and pointed. The eyes are clearly visible. The preserved specimen has lilac-brown anterior part of the body, becoming paler towards the head. The darker dorsal colouration grades through lighter brown to cream-tan ventrally.

== Habitat and conservation ==
The precise location where this species was collected on the Bonaccord estate in 1987 is unknown. It is probably similar to other members of the genus, which are oviparous, lay terrestrial eggs, and are subterranean as adults. Threats to this species are unknown.
