= Basheer Ahmed Sayeed =

Indian judge, politician and educationist

- Born: 20 February 1900
- Died: 7 February 1984 (aged 83)

Basheer Ahmed Sayeed (20 February 1900 – 7 February 1984) was an Indian judge, politician and educationist who served as a member of the Madras Legislative Council and served as a founder-member of the South Indian Education Trust (SIET).

== Early life ==
Sayeed was born in Mylapore, Madras on 20 February 1900 in a wealthy family of Nawayath lineage. His father was an influential landlord in the Madras Presidency. Sayeed graduated from the Madras Christian College and studied law at the Madras Law College, completing his graduation and enrolling as an advocate in 1925.

== Social and political life ==
Sayeed was nominated to the Madras Legislative Council in 1926 as a candidate of the All-India Muslim League and served till 1936. In the 1937 elections, he was elected to the Madras Legislative Assembly as a candidate of the Muslim League. As independence approached, Sayeed left the Muslim League and joined the Indian National Congress.

In July 1949, Sayeed was appointed acting judge of the Madras High Court and as one of the puisne judges in January 1950. He served as a judge of the High Court till retirement in 1960.

Sayeed was one of the founder-members of the South Indian Education Trust whose main objective was to promote education and literacy among the Muslims of South India. The trust established the SIET Women's College in 1955. Sayeed was also the Vice President of the Madras Library Association and the Madras Music Academy. As Vice President of the Music Academy, he was instrumental in obtaining for the academy its own building.

== Death ==
Sayeed died in Madras on 7 February 1984 at the age of 83.

== Legacy ==
An endowment in the name of Sayeed has been supporting the JBAS Centre for Islamic Studies at the University of Madras. The SIET Women's College at Teynampet, Madras was renamed Justice Basheer Ahmed College for Women in his honour. The road where he lived is named Bashyam-Basheer Ahmed Road jointly in honour of Basheer Ahmed Sayeed and fellow advocate and politician K. Bashyam Iyengar.

== Sources ==
- Sriram, V. (2 January 2013). "A road straddling two religions". The Hindu.
