= Sicario =

Sicario (Spanish for 'contract killer') derives from Latin sicarius. It may refer to:

- Killer 77, Alive or Dead (Italian: Sicario 77, vivo o morto, Spanish: Agente End), a 1966 Italian-Spanish Eurospy film
- Sicario (1994 film), a Venezuelan drama film
- Sicario (2015 film), an American action crime thriller film
  - Sicario: Day of the Soldado (titled Sicario 2: Soldado in the UK), a 2018 American action crime thriller film
- Sicario (album), 2005, by Criminal

== See also ==
- Sicarius (disambiguation)
