= N. J. Nandini =

South Indian singer

Dr N J Nandini
- Born: N.J Nandini; 5 August 1991 (age 35); Thiruvananthapuram, Kerala, India
- Genres: Carnatic music, Playback singing
- Occupation: Carnatic singer
- Instrument: Vocals
- Years active: 2004–present
- Website: FB : N.J.Nandini https://www.youtube.com/@NJNandinimusic https://www.instagram.com/njnandini/reels/

N J Nandini (born 5 August 1991) is a Carnatic music vocalist from Thiruvananthapuram. Nandini was awarded the Chembai Puraskaram, the Isai Chudar title and a M S Subbalakshmi fellowship. She is the youngest to receive the Kerala Sangeetha Nataka Akademi Award (Carnatic Music), at the age of 34. Nandini, who comes from a family that has a musical lineage, has been nurtured by gurus such as Parassala Ponnammal.

Nandini, who is the recipient of numerous awards, has performed in concert in India and abroad.

== Early life and family ==
Dr. N.J. Nandini hails from a musical family. Her late grandfather, Vechoor N. Hariharasubramania Iyer, was a Carnatic vocalist and teacher. Her uncle, Vechoor C. Sankar, is a Carnatic musician, while her brother, N.J. Nandagopal, is also a vocalist and mridangam artist. From an early age, Nandini exhibited a deep affinity for music. She was encouraged by her parents, C. Neelakantan and S. Jayanthi, who regularly took her to concerts. Her family ensured she received the finest training in classical music.

Dr. Nandini currently serves as assistant professor of music at Maharaja’s College, Kochi, a position she has held since December 2023. She is also a Top-Grade artiste of All India Radio, Thiruvananthapuram as of 2025. She earned her Doctor of Philosophy (Ph.D.) in Music from the University of Kerala in 2022 and has previously served as a guest lecturer at Sree Swathi Thirunal College of Music, Trivandrum. She is the founder of Nayaki Music and Arts Foundation, a creative and revolutionary platform exclusive for music and arts.

== Career ==
- Kerala Sangeetha Nayaka Akademi Winner (Carnatic Music)
- Top Grade Artiste of All India Radio, Trivandrum (2025)
- The youngest musician to secure "A" grade from All India Radio Thiruvananthapuram
- Received Outstanding Lady Vocalist Award from The Music Academy, Madras
- Winner of All India Radio National Music Competition in 2009
- Winner of the title Ragaratnam Yuva, from Carnatic Music Reality Show in Amrita TV
- 1 st Runner Up in Jaya TV – Pothys Carnatic Music Idol 2011
- 1 st Runner Up in Jaya TV – Vivel Carnatic Music Idol 2012
- The People's Choice Award in Jaya TV – Vivel Carnatic Music Idol 2012
- 1st Rank Holder- MA Music, Kerala University
- Delegate to China, from Ministry of Youth Affairs and Sports, Govt of India in 2014
- ICCR Empaneled Artist since the year 2012
- Recipient of CCRT Cultural Talent Scholarship since 2002
- She has rendered songs for various devotional albums, documentaries, short films and title songs for various television programmes.
- She has composed music for various creative concepts & stage shows such as Bharatha Nandini – Tribute to Mother land, Hari Bhakti Navakam – Nava Vidha Bhakthi Krithis, Bharathiyin Kannamma (Poems of Bharathiyar) Vaggeya Vaibhavam (celebrating illustrious composers of Carnatic Music) and Abhyaasa Gaanam (Mic less practice session), with her students.
- She has composed many dance musical pieces and collaborated with musicians and danseuses.
- She has conceptualized and curated popular musical series such as Malayalam May, Padmanabham and Out of the Box on her YouTube channel.
- She has recorded Soundarya Lahari, 100 verses in 100 ragas composed by KR Kedaranathan.
- She turned playback singer in M Jayachandran's movie Kambhoji, wherein she sang two Kathakali padams.
- Sang in Sachin Shankor Mannath's Neeraja (2023)
- Sang in M Jayachandran's Njanum Pinnoru Njanum

== Select awards, honors and recognition ==
- 2026 - Kerala Sangeetha Nataka Akademi Award (Carnatic Music)
- 2026 - Acharya Ratna Award - Dr TVG’s Academy of Indian Music & Arts, Chennai
- 2026 - Hyderabad Sisters B Lalita Memorial Award - Andhra Mahila Sabha
- 2025 - Sangeetha Prathibha Puraskar - MS Subbulakshmi Foundation
- 2024 - Outstanding Lady Vocalist - The Music Academy, Madras
- 2016 – Mavelikkara Prabhakara Varma Smaraka Yuva Sangeetha Puraskara – Sri Poornathrayesha Sangeetha Sabha, Thrippunithura.
- 2014 – ISAI CHUDAR – Kartik Fine Arts, Chennai
- 2014 – Chembai Puraskar – Cultural Department, Government of Kerala
- 2013 – Madurai Mani Iyer Award – Sri Krishna Gana Sabha, Chennai
- 2013 – Prof P Mahalingam Endowment Award – Narada Gana Sabha, Chennai
- 2013 – Shanmukhananda Bharat Ratna Dr M S Subbulakshmi Fellowship – Shanmukhananda Sangeetha Sabha, Mumbai
- 2013 – Best Vocalist- 2013 – Kuwait Carnatic Music Forum
- 2012 – Best Vocalist - Female – The Spirit of Youth Music and Dance Festival, The Music Academy, Madras
- 2010 – Sangeetha Shri – Travancore Music Society, Harippad
- 2010 – Yuva Sangeetha Prathibha Puraskar – Swaranjali
- 2009 – Ragaratnam Yuva – Amrita TV
- 2009 – Dr. L Muthayya Bhagavathar Award – Edapally Sangeetha Sadas, Ernakulam
- 2009 – Best Female Singer Award – Bharathiya Vidya Bhavan
- 2008 – MLV Srividya Sangeetha Puraskar – MLV Srividya Charitable Society, Thiruvananthapuram
- 2008 – Yuva Sri Kala Bharathi – Bharathi Yuva Kendra, Madurai
- 2008 – Kalathilakom – Bharathiya Vidya Bhavan, Thiruvananthapuram
- 2008 – Award of Accreditation – Sri Sankara council for Assessment & Accreditation, Kalady
- 2007 – Venuganam Award – Neelakanta Sivan Sangeetha Sabha, Trivandrum
- 2005 – Augustine Joseph Memorial Award – Poornathrayeesha Sangeetha Sabha, Thrippunithura
- 2005 – Uma Maheswaran Memorial Award – Chembai Memorial Trust, Thiruvananthapuram
- 2005 – Vaikom Vasudevan Nair Memorial Award – Vaikathashtami Festival
- 2004 – Best Young Talent Award – VDS Arts Academy, Chennai
