= Neena Prasad =

Indian dancer

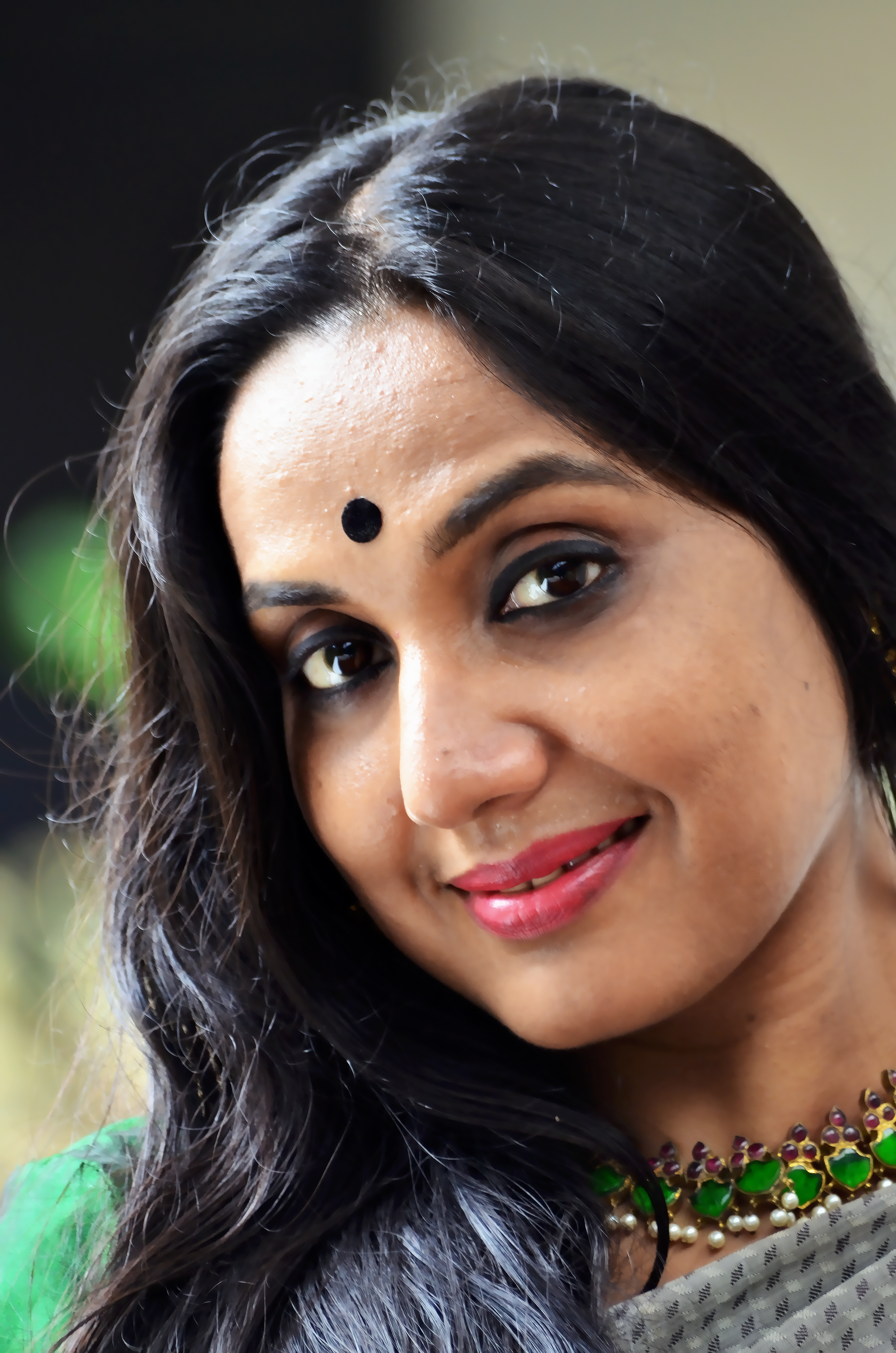
- Born: Thiruvananthapuram, India
- Occupations: Indian classical dancer; choreographer; academic
- Known for: Mohiniyattam
- Spouse: Adv Sunil.C.Kurian
- Website: neenaprasad.com

Neena Prasad is an Indian dancer. She is an exponent in the field of Mohiniyattam. She is the founder and principal of Bharthanjali Academy of Indian Dances in Thiruvananthapuram and Sougandika Centre for Mohinyattam in Chennai.

== Early life and education ==
She pursued dance education, achieving proficiency in Bharatanatyam, Kuchipudi, Mohiniyattam and Kathakali. After her MA in English Literature, she was awarded a PhD from Rabindra Bharati University, Calcutta, for her thesis on "The concepts of Lasya and Tandava in the classical dances of South India-A detailed Study". She was also awarded a post doctoral Research Fellowship from the AHRB Research Centre for Cross Cultural Music and Dance Performance, University of Surrey.

Her professional training included:

- Mohiniyattam - Kalamandalam Sugandhi – 8 years
- Kalamandalam Kshemavathy – 3 years
- Bharatanatyam - Padmashri Adyar K. Lakshman – 11 years
- Kuchipudi - Padmabhushan Vempatti China Satyam –12 years
- Kathakali - Vembayam Appukuttan Pillai – 10 years

== Awards ==
Prasad received the Kerala Sangeetha Nataka Akademi Award in 2007. She is a recipient of the Mayilpeeli Award. She also received the "Nirtya Chudamani" Award in 2015. Received Kerala Kalmandalam Award 2017 (Mohiniyattam)
