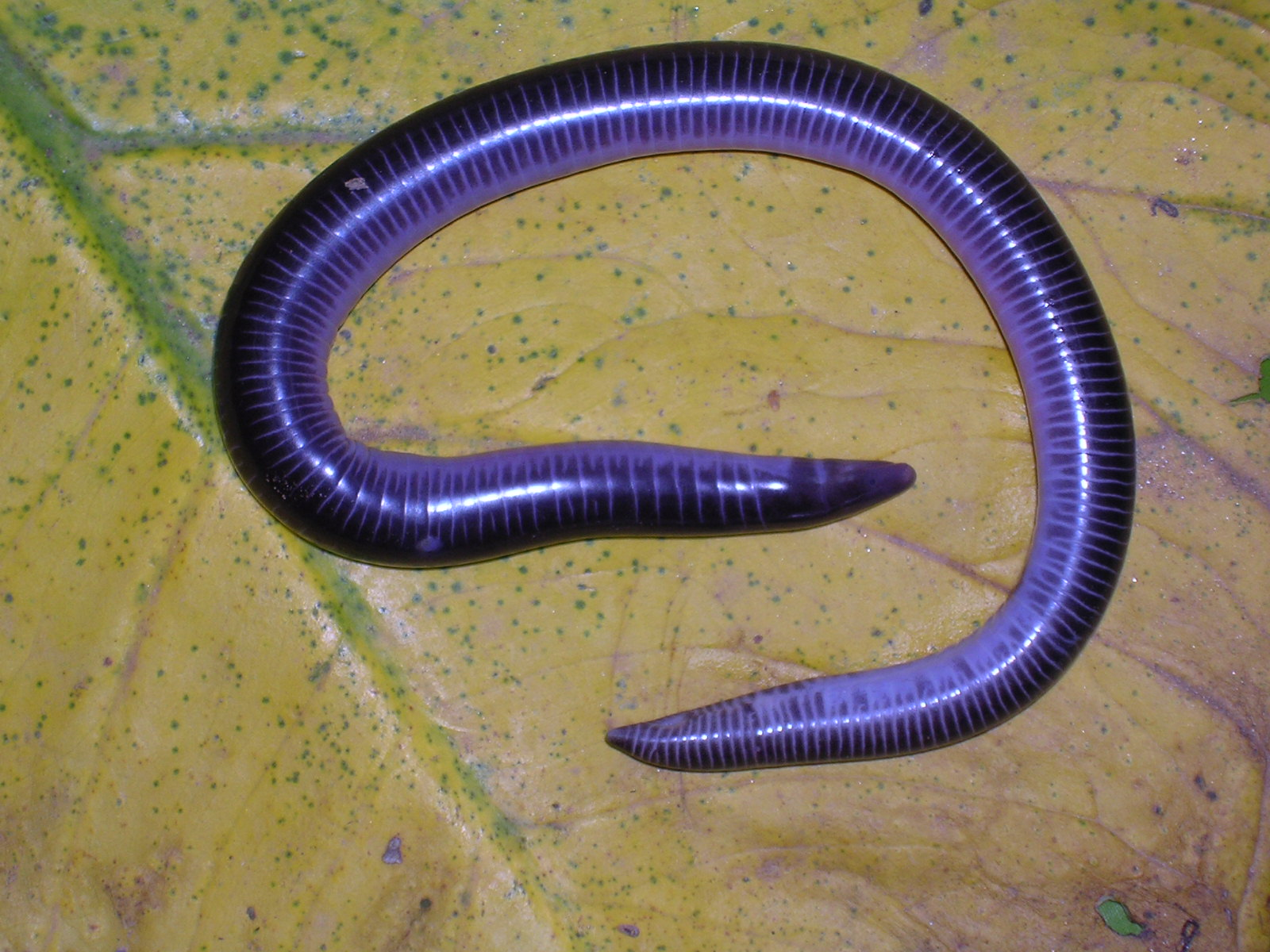

Conservation status
- Data Deficient (IUCN 3.1)

Scientific classification
- Kingdom: Animalia
- Phylum: Chordata
- Class: Amphibia
- Order: Gymnophiona
- Clade: Apoda
- Family: Ichthyophiidae
- Genus: Uraeotyphlus
- Species: U. oxyurus

Binomial name
- Uraeotyphlus oxyurus (Duméril and Bibron, 1841)

Synonyms
- Caecilia oxyura Duméril and Bibron, 1841

= Uraeotyphlus oxyurus =

Species of amphibian

Uraeotyphlus oxyurus, also known as the red caecilian, sharp-nosed caecilian, dark-brown caecilian, pale-throated caecilian, or harp-tailed caecilian, is a species of caecilian in the family Ichthyophiidae. It is endemic to the Western Ghats in Kerala and Tamil Nadu, southern India.

== Description ==
This species has a relatively thick body, a narrow head, and a short tail. It can grow to 300 mm (11.8 in) in total length, including the tail (up to 7.5 mm (0.3 in)). Its body is dark brown with a whitish tail tip. The chin and throat are light brown. Its eyes are very small but distinct and surrounded by a white ring. The tentacles are placed close to and below the nostrils, which are visible from above.

== Habitat and conservation ==
Uraeotyphlus oxyurus is a fossorial species that is associated with humus-rich, loose, moist soil. It has been recorded from moist evergreen forest, agricultural land, and rural gardens at elevations up to 1,500 m (4,900 ft) above sea level. It is probably oviparous and has terrestrial eggs and aquatic larvae.

Threats to this species are poorly understood. Potential threats include habitat destruction, although it appears to be adaptable. Also the use of agrochemicals, changes in soil chemistry, and collection of humus by local people might be threats. Uraeotyphlus oxyurus possibly occurs in the Wayanad Wildlife Sanctuary.
