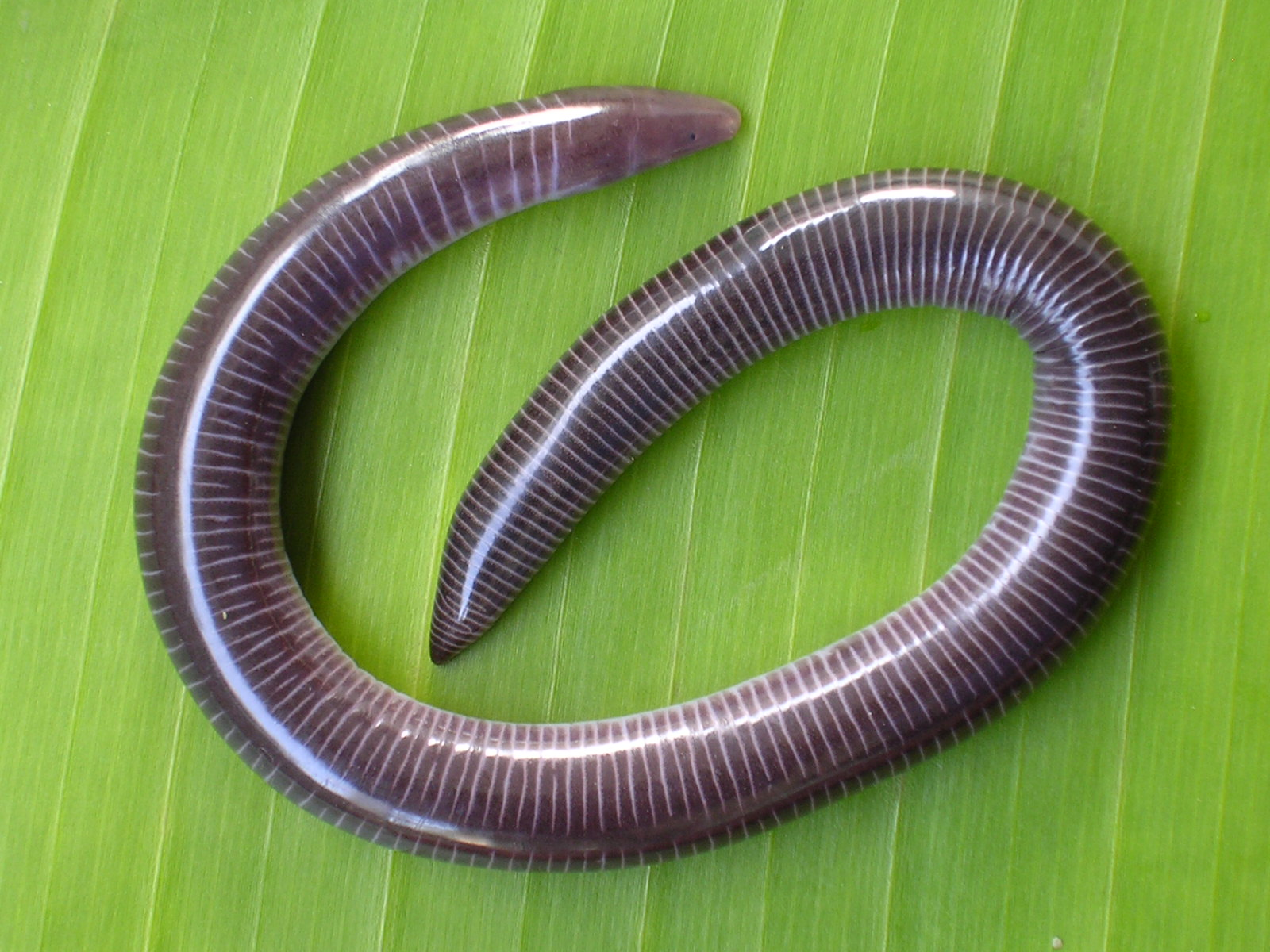

Conservation status
- Data Deficient (IUCN 3.1)

Scientific classification
- Kingdom: Animalia
- Phylum: Chordata
- Class: Amphibia
- Order: Gymnophiona
- Clade: Apoda
- Family: Ichthyophiidae
- Genus: Uraeotyphlus
- Species: U. narayani

Binomial name
- Uraeotyphlus narayani Seshachar, 1939

= Uraeotyphlus narayani =

Species of amphibian

Uraeotyphlus narayani, or Narayan's caecilian, is a species of caecilian endemic to the Western Ghats of India.

== Description ==
This species is grey with a pale, flesh-coloured belly. A median greenish line runs between the chin and the tail. Its eyes are distinct with a white patch around them. The nostril are placed dorsally on the snout and visible from above. The tentacles are placed below the nostrils, not visible from above. The tip of the tail is whitish, and the snout tip and lower jaw are cream-coloured. It was described from Kottayam in Kerala, and has been reported from Karnataka.
