= Priya Sisters =

- Origin: Chittoor, Andhra Pradesh India
- Genre: Carnatic music
- Occupation: Singers

Shanmukhapriya and Haripriya, popularly known as the Priya Sisters, are Carnatic music singers.

== Early life ==
They attended Little Flower School in Chittoor, Andhra Pradesh. They started learning Carnatic music from their father, Sri V.V.Subbaram, at an early age. In order to nurture their musical talent, their father shifted base to Chennai. Later they became the disciples of the renowned duo Radha and Jayalakshmi who were disciples of the legendary G. N. Balasubramaniam. They learnt many nuances and subtleties of music during the five-year tenure under Radha and Jayalakshmi including the advice that the singing should be so clear that the listener should be able to notate the entire kriti.

== Career ==
In order to improve their repertoire, they studied with Professor T. R. Subramaniam, who taught them many pallavis and kritis.

They are part of the trend of duo singing in Carnatic music, which started in the 1950s, with performers like Radha Jayalakshmi, Soolamangalam Sisters and later continued by the Bombay Sisters

== Awards ==
- Kalaimamani Award - 2018
