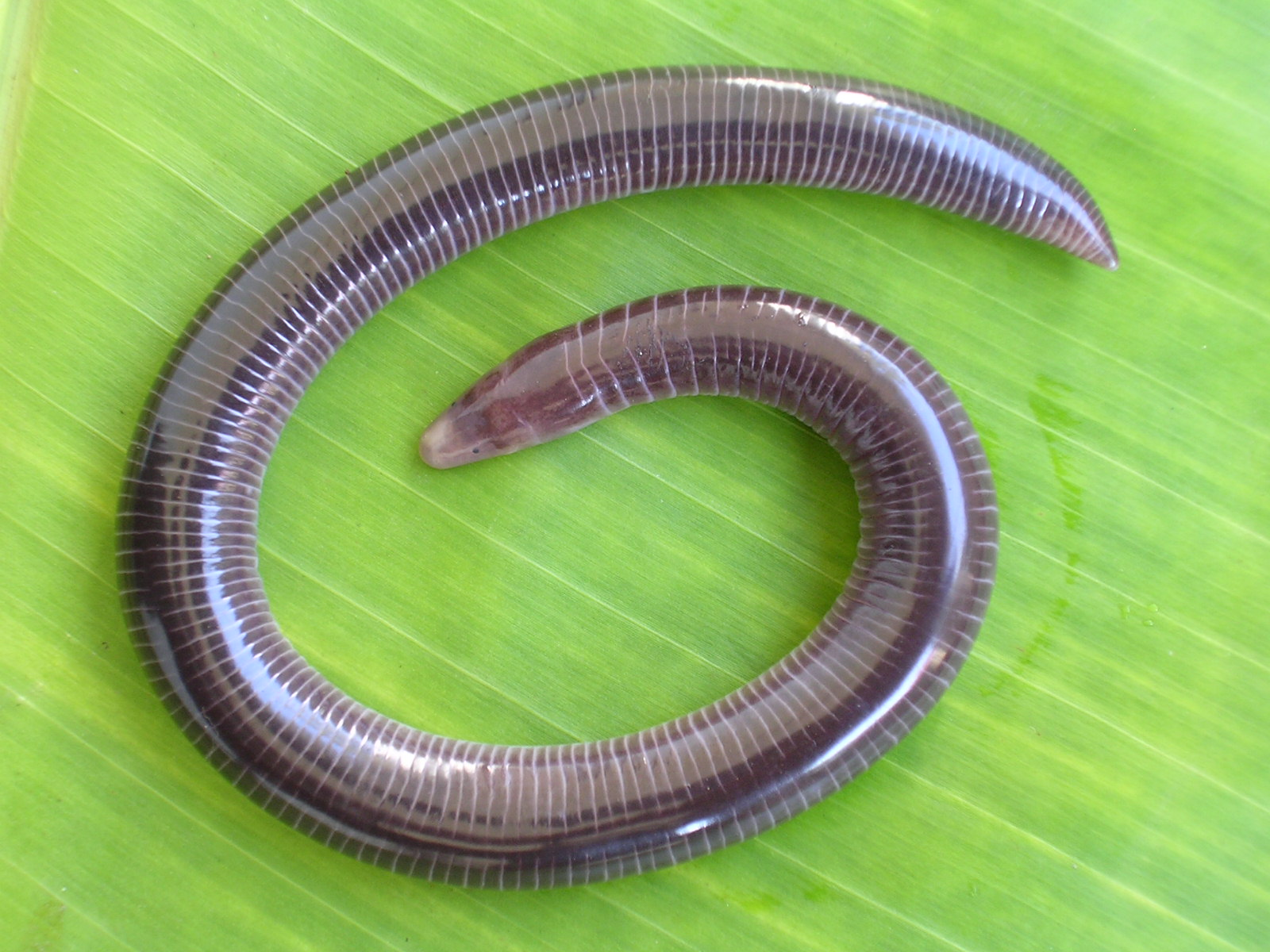

Conservation status
- Data Deficient (IUCN 3.1)

Scientific classification
- Kingdom: Animalia
- Phylum: Chordata
- Class: Amphibia
- Order: Gymnophiona
- Clade: Apoda
- Family: Ichthyophiidae
- Genus: Uraeotyphlus
- Species: U. interruptus

Binomial name
- Uraeotyphlus interruptus Pillai and Ravichandran, 1999

= Uraeotyphlus interruptus =

Species of amphibian

Uraeotyphlus interruptus, also known as the Chengalam caecilian, is a species of caecilian in the family Ichthyophiidae. It is endemic to the Western Ghats in southern India and is only known from its type locality, Chengalam village in Kerala.

== Description ==
Uraeotyphlus interruptus is a medium-sized caecilian measuring 185 mm (7.3 in) in length. The body has 162 folds. The primary annuli cross the dorsum only on the posterior half and venter only in front of the vent. The collar region is slightly wider than the head; the two collars are completely fused dorsally but are distinct ventrally. The eyes are distinct. The ventral tentacle lies below the nostril. Colouration is slaty violet above, slightly lighter below. The body folds are marked by white lines that are more conspicuous on the posterior ventral one-third of the body.

== Habitat and conservation ==
Uraeotyphlus interruptus is a subterranean (fossorial) species associated with loose soil. The type series was collected in a rubber plantation at an elevation of 400 m (1,300 ft) above sea level; presumably, the natural habitat of this species is moist evergreen forest. It is probably oviparous with terrestrial eggs and aquatic larvae living in streams.

Specific threats to this species are unknown. However, it clearly is somewhat adaptable, and as such might not face significant threat from habitat change. It is not known to occur in any protected areas.
