= Jayaprada Ramamurthy =

Indian flautist

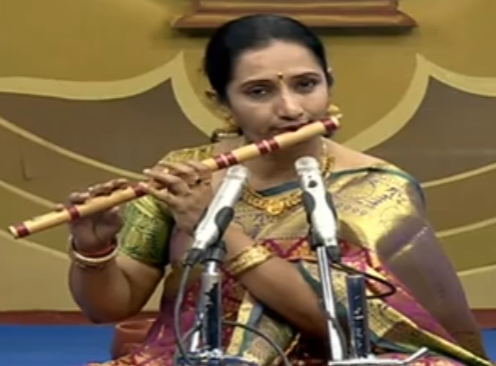
- In a recital for Doordarshan
- Born: Hyderabad, Telangana
- Occupation: instrumentalist
- Parents: Venkataramana Ramamurthy (father); Prema Ramamurthy (mother)
- Awards: 'KALARATNA' (HAMSA) State Award from Govt. of Andhra Pradesh, Kartik Award Excellence, Acharya Nagarjuna University Award, Ugadi Puraskaram State Award, National Fellowship, Govt. of India.
- Musical career
- Genres: Indian classical music
- Instrument: Flute

Dr.Jayaprada Ramamurthy is an Indian flautist from Andhra Pradesh & Telangana. She is known to be the first female flautist from Andhra Pradesh & Telangana, and the first woman and the youngest to receive an "A-TOP-grade" in Carnatic Flute from All India Radio and Doordarshan. She plays both Carnatic and Hindustani styles of music.

She received many awards and honors including the KALARATNA (Hamsa) State Award from Government of Andhra Pradesh, National Fellowship Award, Doctorate from Osmania University, Best Flutist from Madras Music Academy, Acharya Nagarjuna University Award, State Govt. Award Ugadi Puraskaram, Bharati Gaurav Puraskar, Kartik Award of Excellence.

== Biography ==
Dr.Jayaprada Ramamurthy was born in Hyderabad, Andhra Pradesh (now in Telangana) to Prema Ramamurthy a noted Carnatic vocalist and Venkataramana Ramamurthy, a scientist at the Bhabha Atomic Research Centre in Mumbai. Her maternal grandfather, Srinivasa Sastri who was Zamindar of Ballari, used to play the flute. Although a musician, her mother Prema was not interested in her daughter pursuing a career in music due to the difficulties she faced in supporting the family after her husband's death. She completed her doctorate in commerce for her research on marketing of performing arts and intellectual property rights, from Osmania University in Hyderabad, Telangana.

Jayaprada started playing flute at an early age without any formal training. Although her mother was not interested in pursuing a career in music for her daughter, realizing her interest in the flute, she took her to Chennai for training flute under the guidance of Padma Shri awardee N. Ramani. Under the guidance of her guru, she began performing on stage at the age of twelve. Her first performance was at the Ganapati Temple in Secunderabad.

Jayaprada later received advanced training in Carnatic and Hindustani flute under many other noted artists including Hariprasad Chaurasia

== Career ==
Dr.Jayaprada Ramamurthy, who began her career as a singer, sang in various concerts & recordings, and also accompanied with her mother Prema Ramamurthy as a teenager and won several prizes in music competitions.

Jayaprada, known to be the first female flutist from Andhra Pradesh, is the first and the youngest female flutist to receive an 'A-Top-grade' in Carnatic Flute from All India Radio and Doordarshan in the Twin Telugu States. She can play different types of flute including the western key flute. She is also recognized as the first woman to use the bass (long) flute and the western key flute on the concert stage. She has also developed a new raga in Carnatic music, Uma.

In 2019, Jayaprada was nominated as a member for Sri Venkateswara Bhakti Channel, the official channel of the Tirumala Tirupati Devasthanams. She has traveled to over 20 countries as a solo performing artist for prestigious festivals abroad including ICCR Festivals, Royal Tropical Hall, CGI 80th Year Australia, ICCR Moscow Russia, Cleveland Tyagaraja Festival, Orchard Ridge Theater, VT Blacksburg USA, Australian Institute of Music, ICCR Colombo, UAE, UK, Bengal Festival Dhaka, Singapore, Malaysia, Sri Lanka & others. She is a panel member of CCRT, Prasar Bharati, UCC&BM etc. She is an empaneled artist of Ministry of Culture, India. She has performed for prestigious festivals including Sangeet Natak Akademi, Sangeet Sammelan, Bhimsen Joshi Samaroh, Madras Music Academy, Bharatiya Vidya Bhavan, Kartik Fine Arts, and regularly participates in the Tiruvayaru Tyagaraja Utsavam.

Jayaprada is also promoting Indian classical music and flute through Global Flute Foundation, started by her parents in 1999. The foundation recently celebrated its 25th year of establishment. She has been extensively reviewed by the media, and has performed for several television & media channels including DD Bharati, Doordarshan National, SVBC TTD, Bhakti Tv, Tv5, Tv9,

Jayaprada plays both Carnatic and Hindustani styles. She has done solo performances in various venues across the country and outside. She has also authored a book titled Basics of Flute Playing.

Jayaprada made her film debut as a flautist in the film Om Namo Venkatesaya directed by Raghavendra Rao. After that, she also performed in films like Vakeel Saab, Baahubali 2. She has worked with music director M. M. Keeravani for film projects.

== Awards and honors ==
Dr.Jayaprada has received numerous awards including: KALARATNA (Hamsa) State Award, Govt. of Andhra Pradesh 2026, Acharya Nagarjuna University Award, 2023, Ugadi Puraskaram from Government of Andhra Pradesh in 2012. Kartik Award of Excellence 2019, Madras Music Academy Best Flutist Award 2002 & 2008, Best Performer Indian Fine Arts Society Chennai, Titles including 'Vamshi Vinodini', 'Venugana Praveena', 'Sangita Ratna'. She was conferred the title 'Venugana Gandharvi' at World Buddhist Peace Conference. She was awarded National Fellowship by Ministry of culture, Govt of India, and National Women's award from CM of Delhi 2011.

Jayaprada is also received honors like Asthana Vidushi position from many Hindu religious institutions including the Kanchi Kamakoti Peetham, Kanchipuram, Tamil Nadu, the Mysore Datta Peetham, Mysore, Karnataka, the Yadagirigutta Sri Lakshmi Narasimha Swamy Devasthanam, Telangana, Srisailam Devasthanam, Srisailam, Andhra Pradesh.
