= Hyderabad Brothers =

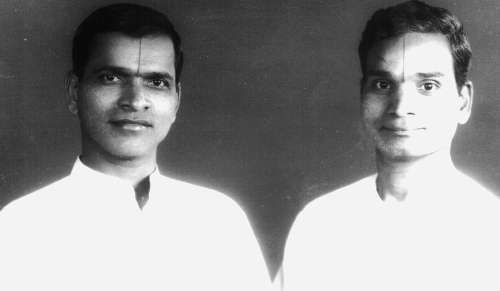
- D. Raghavachari and D. Seshachari

Background information
- Born: Yakutpura, Hyderabad, Andhra Pradesh, India
- Genres: Carnatic music, Vocalist, Duo singers

The Hyderabad Brothers, D. Raghavachari (b 1952) and D. Seshachari (1956-2024), were a Carnatic music singing duo. They were one among the most popular duo vocalists in Indian Classical Carnatic music. D Seshachary died on 24 February 2024, at the age of 67, while receiving treatment for cancer. They are popularly known as Hyderabad brothers because of their long association with the city.

== Lineage ==
Vidwan RaghavaChari and Vidwan SeshaChari belong to a family of traditional classical musicians. They got their initial formal training from their father Daruri Ratnamacharyulu. Their mother Daruri Sulochana Devi was also a carnatic classical musician. As a couple the parents of SeshaChari and RagavaChari presented regular recitals in Yadagiri Gutta. SeshaChari and RaghavaChari`s family originally belonged to Hayathnagar but later, the family moved to Yakutpura where RaghavaChari and SeshaChari were born. RaghavaChari further developed his musical prowess under the tutelage of Susarla Sivaram at the Government College of Music and Dance in Hyderabad.

== Performance ==
Hyderabad Brothers over the years have performed in various reputed musical forums in India including All India Radio and Doordarshan. They have also participated in AIR Sangeetha Sammelan, Spirit of Unity Concerts (TV), Central Production Centre (CPC), Television and Doordarshan National Network Programs. The Hyderabad Brothers have at least 50 musical CDs and cassettes to their credit. Besides numerous performances in India, they have also performed in countries like USA, Canada, Australia, and Qatar. His disciples Dr. Sri Nallan Chakravartula Pardhasaradhi, SMT Dr. Mangalampalli Swarna, SMT SangeethaKala and RajyaLakshmi (Junior Hyderabad Sisters) are a famous performing artists.

== Musical style ==
Sri Seshachari’s is known for his more robust, deep and resonant singing, and Raghavachary’s rendition is known to be mellow and soft in comparison.Their musical skills and style are often compared to that of the legendary Alathur Brothers by their fans. Ramesh Hariharan is among the many prominent musicians who have received formal training from Hyderabad Brothers. Hyderabad Brothers have a distinct style of musical rendition and voice timbre which mutually blends with each other.

== Awards ==
Early in their career, they received the Best Young Talent Award in 1977 and 1978 by the Sangeetha Nataka Akademi, Hyderabad. The Madras Music Academy honoured them as the best vocalists for three consecutive years — 1990, 1991, and 1992. In 1993, The Music Academy presented them the Maharajapuram Viswanatha Iyer Award for the best rendering of rare Thyagaraja kritis. They were also honoured by the prestigious Krishna Gana Sabha as Best Vocalists in 1988, 1990 and 1991. In 1992, the duo were nominated as aasthana vidwans of the Kanchi Kamakoti Peetham to mark the 58th birthday of Sri Jayendra Saraswathi. In 2011 they were bestowed with the ‘Senior Outstanding Vocalists’ award by the s Music Academy in Chennai. In 2012, the Hyderabad brothers were felicitated with the Kalarathna award from the government of Andhra Pradesh. To recognize their contribution to the Indian classical music they were conferred the title Sangeetha Choodamani by the Indian community in Austin, Texas. And in 2017, they are awarded with 'Sapthagiri sangeetha Vidhwan Mani' by Tirumala Tirupati Devasthanam.
