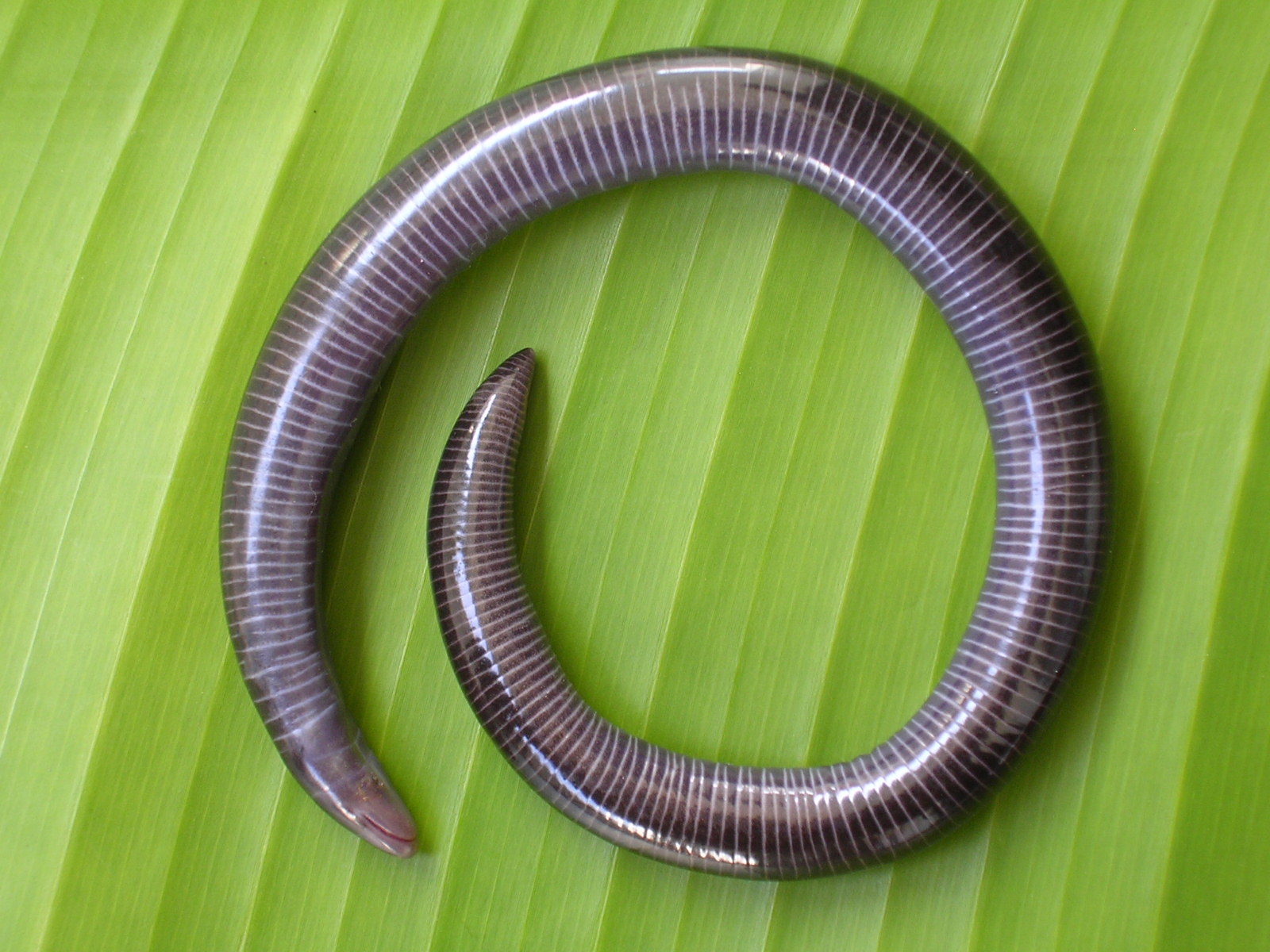

Conservation status
- Data Deficient (IUCN 3.1)

Scientific classification
- Kingdom: Animalia
- Phylum: Chordata
- Class: Amphibia
- Order: Gymnophiona
- Clade: Apoda
- Family: Ichthyophiidae
- Genus: Uraeotyphlus
- Species: U. menoni

Binomial name
- Uraeotyphlus menoni Annandale, 1913

= Uraeotyphlus menoni =

Species of amphibian

Uraeotyphlus menoni, also known as Menon's caecilian or Kerala caecilian, is a species of caecilian in the family Ichthyophiidae. It is endemic to the state of Kerala in the Western Ghats, India. The specific name menoni honours K. Ramunni Menon, collector of the holotype who later became the vice-chancellor of the University of Madras.

== Description ==
Uraeotyphlus menoni can grow to 248 mm (9.8 in) in total length. It is a greyish species with a white belly blotched with grey. The head is light violet in colour with light mottling, and the distinct eyes are surrounded by a light ring. The tip of the snout and lower jaw are whitish in colour, also with grey spots. The tip of the short tail (<1 cm) is whitish in colour. The tentacles are placed close to and below the nostrils. The nostrils are visible from above.

== Habitat and conservation ==
Uraeotyphlus menoni is a subterranean (fossorial) species associated with humus-rich, loose, moist soil. It occurs in both tropical moist forest and agricultural land at elevations below 500 m (1,600 ft) asl. It is probably oviparous with terrestrial eggs and aquatic larvae.

This species appears to be reasonably adaptable and is probably not severely threatened, even though local populations might be threatened by severe habitat destruction. It might also be threatened by agrochemicals, changes in soil chemistry, and collection of humus. It is not known to occur in any protected areas.
