= Uraeotyphlus gansi =

Conservation status
- Data Deficient (IUCN 3.1)

Scientific classification
- Kingdom: Animalia
- Phylum: Chordata
- Class: Amphibia
- Order: Gymnophiona
- Clade: Apoda
- Family: Ichthyophiidae
- Genus: Uraeotyphlus
- Species: U. gansi

Binomial name
- Uraeotyphlus gansi Gower, Rajendran, Nussbaum & Wilkinson, 2008

Species of amphibian

Uraeotyphlus gansi, the Gansi caecilian, is a rare species of caecilian, endemic to the Western Ghats of India. It was discovered in the Kaakkaachi-Naalumukku area of the Kalakkad Mundanthurai Tiger Reserve. U. gansi was named after Carl Gans (1923–2009), a renowned herpetologist from Texas.

According to Albert Rajendran, Research Department of Zoology, St. John's College, Palayamkottai, Rajendran spotted the species, along with his collaborator David J. Gower of the Natural History Museum, London, and two other experts in caecilians. He came across this limbless amphibian in the Kaakkaachi-Naalumukku areas during his study of the burrowing uropeltid (shield-tailed) snakes of the Western Ghats.
