= South Indian Cultural Association, Indore =

School

South Indian Cultural Association
- Abbreviation: SICA
- Formation: 1953–1954
- Headquarters: Indore, Madhya Pradesh, India
- Website: sicaindore.org

The South Indian Cultural Association (SICA) is a cultural organisation based in Indore, Madhya Pradesh, India. It was established in 1953–1954 by people from southern India who had settled in the city. The association organises cultural programmes and community events, including music performances and annual foundation-day celebrations.

== History ==
SICA was formed in 1953–1954 as a common platform for people from different South Indian communities living in Indore. Its initial membership included people who had moved to the city for employment and business. According to a report published by The Times of India in 2016, the association originally catered to different South Indian communities. Its focus later shifted towards the Tamil community as separate associations for people from Karnataka, Kerala and Andhra Pradesh were established in Indore.

The association acquired land in Sanghi Colony in 1968 and constructed a building for its activities, according to its published organisational history.

== Cultural activities ==
The association has hosted Carnatic music performances at its auditorium in Indore. In April 2015, it organised a concert featuring vocalist P. Nandani, accompanied by mridangam player Nellai Balaji. The programme included compositions by Muthuswami Dikshitar and Tyagaraja.

SICA's annual foundation-day celebrations have included musical performances and the recognition of members. At its 2016 celebration, the association invited speaker P. Manikandan from Chennai to deliver a Tamil discourse. Senior member and lawyer P. B. S. Nair and his wife Kalyani Nair were also felicitated for their contributions to the organisation.

The 2017 foundation-day programme featured traditional music and a flute performance by Prapancham Shri Balchandran. The association also felicitated Dr V. Ganesan, a scientist and senior member associated with Devi Ahilya Vishwavidyalaya, for his work in education and science. The report stated that about 250 families were registered with the association at the time.

In April 2022, SICA held its 66th foundation-day celebration at the SICA School auditorium in Sanghi Colony. The programme included the felicitation of Vijayalakshmi Iyengar, managing trustee of SICA Education Trust, and Padmini Khazanchi, its chairperson. Students who had scored more than 90 per cent in their Class 10 or 12 examinations were also recognised.

== Education ==
SICA has also been involved in education through schools associated with the organisation. According to its own history, it opened a school in 1973 at its Sanghi Colony premises, initially offering classes from kindergarten to the first standard. The school later expanded to other locations in Indore.

In January 2014, The Times of India reported on an exhibition organised by SICA School at Scheme No. 78. Students displayed projects in science, mathematics, social science, art and craft, languages and computers. P. Babuji, identified in the report as the managing trustee of SICA Association, attended the exhibition as chief guest.
