= Uraeotyphlus malabaricus =

Conservation status
- Data Deficient (IUCN 3.1)

Scientific classification
- Kingdom: Animalia
- Phylum: Chordata
- Class: Amphibia
- Order: Gymnophiona
- Clade: Apoda
- Family: Ichthyophiidae
- Genus: Uraeotyphlus
- Species: U. malabaricus

Binomial name
- Uraeotyphlus malabaricus (Beddome, 1870)

Synonyms
- Cecilia malabarica Beddome, 1870

Species of amphibian

Uraeotyphlus malabaricus is a species of caecilian in the family Ichthyophiidae. It is endemic to the Western Ghats of India and is known from its type locality, the "Malabar" in Kerala, and from the Nilgiri mountains in Tamil Nadu. It is known by several common names.Malabar tailed caecilian, Nilgiris caecilian, Malabar caecilian, and white-lipped caecilian.

== Description ==
Adults measure 145–234 mm (5.7–9.2 in), including the 3–6 mm (0.1–0.2 in) tail. The body is short and stout, violet-colored dorsally, and lighter ventrally. The eyes are distinct and surrounded by a light ring. The tentacles are placed ventrally, close to the lip. Light-colored areas are present around the nostrils, snout tip, and tentacles. The upper lips and lower jaw are also a light cream color. There is a light spot near the vent, and the tip of the tail is whitish.

== Habitat and conservation ==
Uraeotyphlus malabaricus has been collected in evergreen tropical forest (600–1,200 m (2,000–3,900 ft) above sea level), but its ecology is generally poorly known. Presumably, the adults are fossorial. It is probably an oviparous species, laying terrestrial eggs and having aquatic larvae.

Threats to this species are unknown. It occurs in the Kalakkad Mundanthurai Tiger Reserve.
