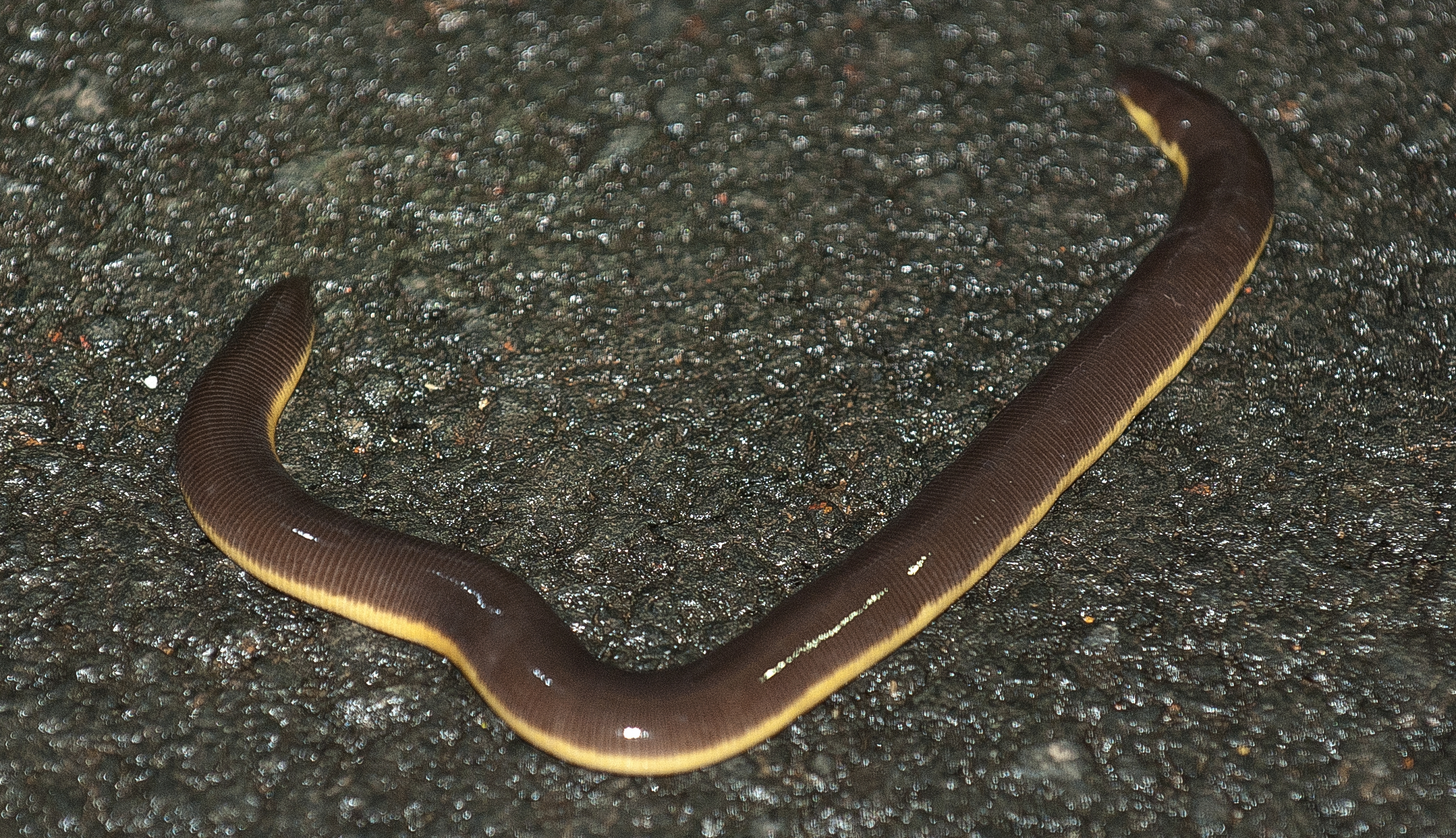
- From Surla, Mhadei Wildlife Sanctuary

Conservation status
- Least Concern (IUCN 3.1)

Scientific classification
- Kingdom: Animalia
- Phylum: Chordata
- Class: Amphibia
- Order: Gymnophiona
- Clade: Apoda
- Family: Ichthyophiidae
- Genus: Ichthyophis
- Species: I. beddomei

Binomial name
- Ichthyophis beddomei Peters, 1880
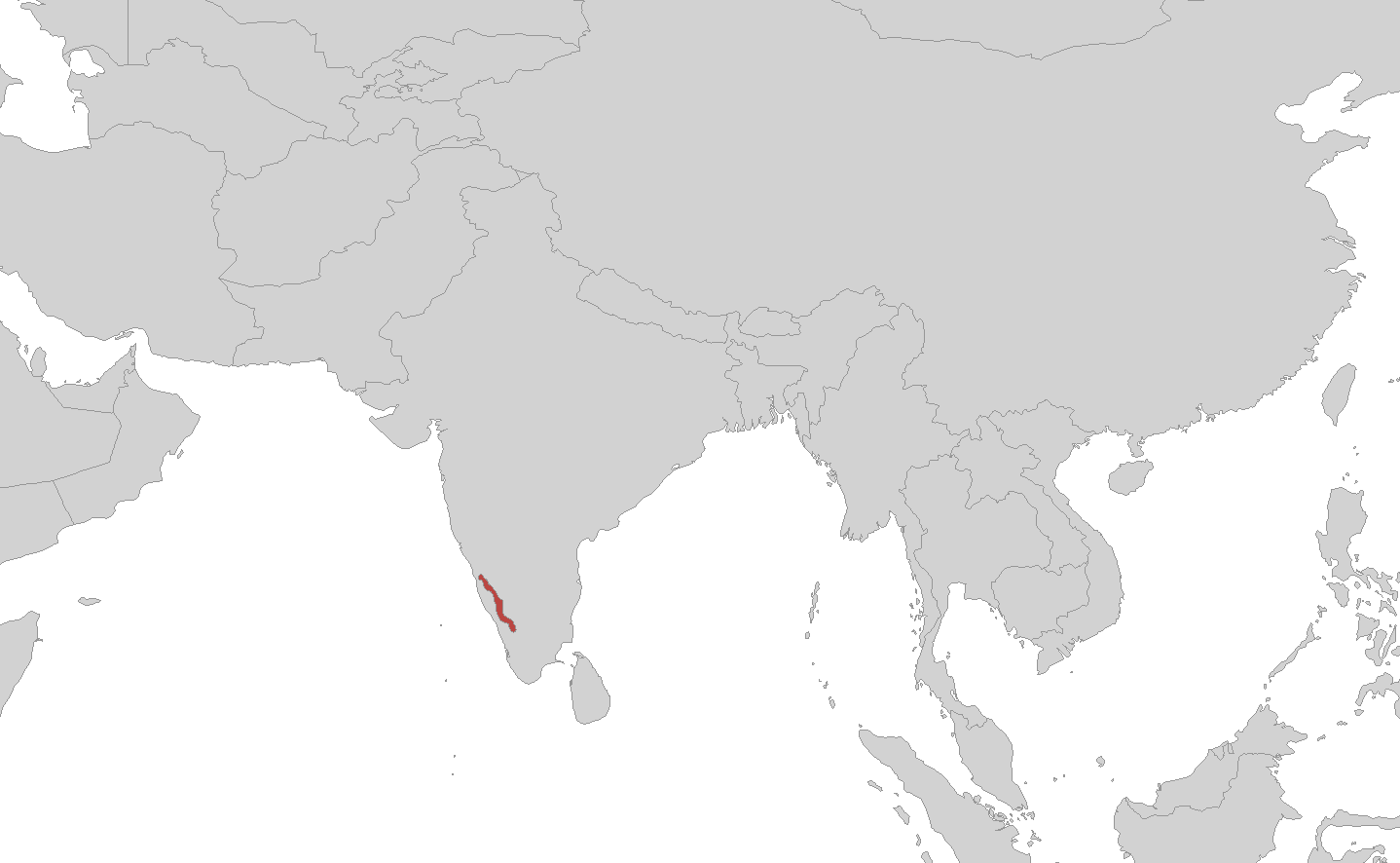
- I. beddomei range

Synonyms
- Ichthyophis Beddomei Peters, 1880 "1879"

= Ichthyophis beddomei =

Species of amphibian

Ichthyophis beddomei is a species of caecilian in the family Ichthyophiidae. This species is distributed widely in the Western Ghats in southern India. The nominal species might be a composite of several cryptic species. It is also known as the yellow-striped caecilian, Beddome's caecilian, or Nilgherries caecilian.

== Description ==
Adults measure 210–270 mm (8.3–10.6 in) in total length, including the 4–5 mm (0.16–0.20 in) long tail. The body is dark violet-brown, becoming light brown ventrally. A yellow lateral stripe runs from the head to the tail tip. The stripe becomes slightly wider at the neck. The upper lip and lower jaw are also yellow in colour. The eyes are distinct. The tentacles are placed very close to the lip and almost equidistant from the eyes and nostrils. The nostrils at the tip of the snout are visible from above. The upper jaw slightly overhangs the lower jaw.

== Habitat and conservation ==
Ichthyophis beddomei is a subterranean species associated with leaf-litter, humus, and soil substrates. It lives in wet evergreen tropical forest but can also occur in low-intensity agricultural areas and in plantations. It occurs at elevations up to 1,000 m (3,300 ft) above sea level. It is an adaptable species that can be locally abundant, but severe habitat destruction remains a potential threat. It probably occurs in several protected areas.
