= D. Balakrishna =

Carnatic veena musician

Vidwan D. Balakrishna
- Born: c. 1955-1956
- Awards: Karnataka Kalashri(2015); Ganakalashri (1997)
- Musical career
- Genre: Carnatic music
- Instrument: Veena
- Years active: 1975-present

D. Balakrishna is a Carnatic musician who plays veena in the Mysore tradition.

Born c. 1955-1956, he is the son of noted veena player, Doraiswamy Iyengar and grandson of Venkatesh Iyengar, a student of Veena Venkatagiriyappa. Contemporary musicians Titte Krishna Iyengar, N. Ramani, T.R. Mahalingam and T. Chowdiah frequently visited his father and sparked his interest in Carnatic music. In his childhood, he was sent to mridangam classes under Ayyamani Iyer. Later his father started teaching him veena.

His first stage performance was in 1975, when he accompanied his father in a Ram navami concert in Bengaluru. By 1979, his concerts were being broadcast in All India Radio, where he is now listed as a "top grade" artist. He has given multiple Madras Music Season concerts over the years, starting in 1984.

His "Veena Doreswamy Iyengar Memorial Trust" has organized various concerts in Bengaluru. He has an M.Sc. in statistics and has worked in the Reserve Bank of India.

In 1997, Karnataka Ganakala Parishat gave him Ganakalashree award. In 2015, Karnataka Sangeeta Nritya Academy awarded him Karnataka Kalashri - Award of Honour. and the Central Government awarded him the 2023 Sangeet Natak Akademi award, only the 19th veena player in the 71 year operating history of the award.
