= Ravindra Yavagal =

Indian tabla artiste (born 1959)

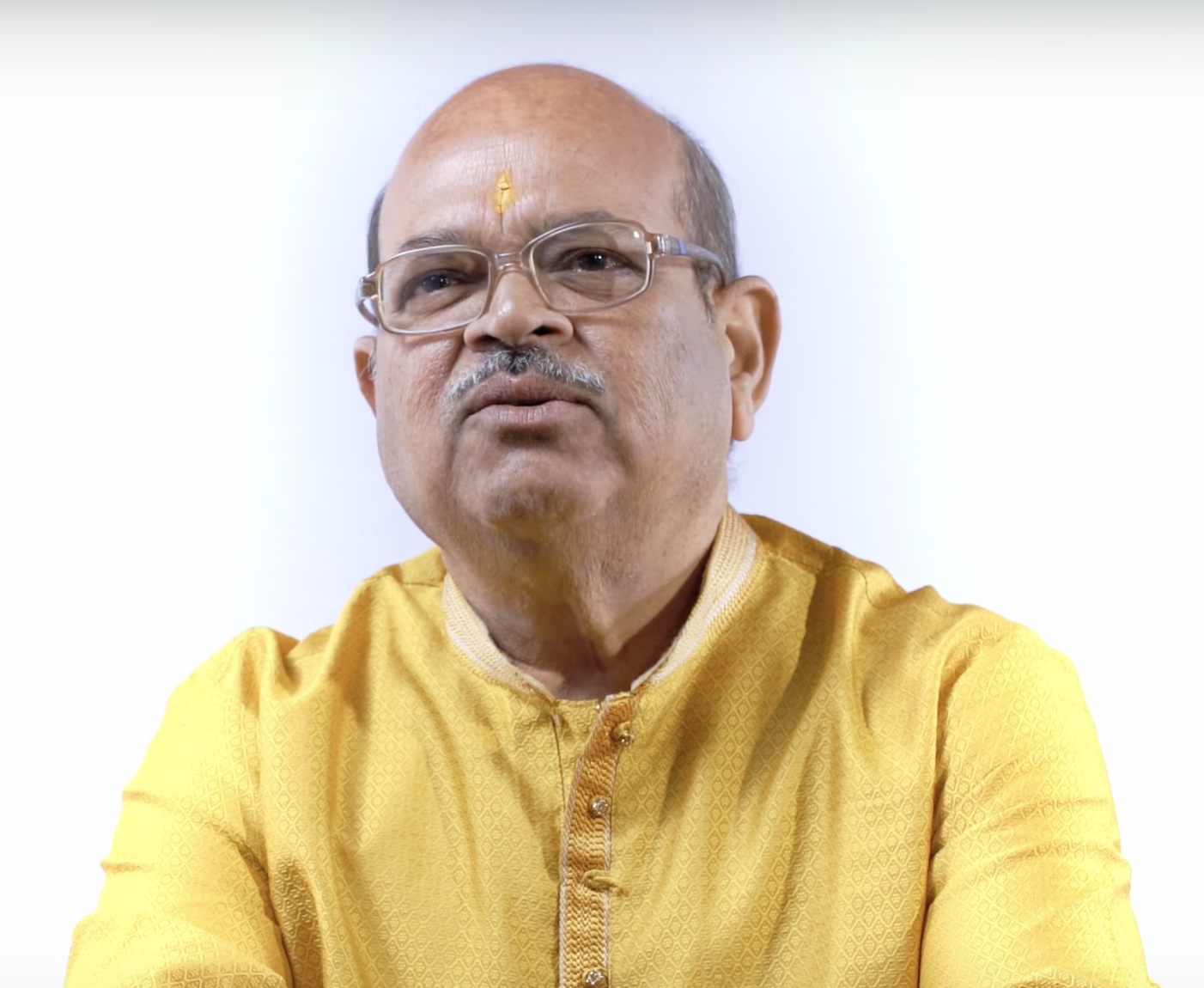
- Yavagal in February 2021
- Born: 1959; Karnataka, India
- Occupation: Tabla player
- Employer: All India Radio
- Children: 2
- Awards: Rajyotsava Award (1995); Karnataka Kalashri (2016–17); Sangeet Natak Akademi Award (2021)

Pandit Ravindra Yavagal (born 1959) is an Indian tabla player, performer and music teacher from the state of Karnataka. An eminent artiste, he is both a soloist and an accompanist. He received Rajyotsava Award in 1995, Karnataka Kalashri for 2016–17 and Sangeet Natak Akademi Award in 2021 for his contributions.

== Early life ==
Ravindra Yavagal was born in 1959 in a Kannadiga family to Ramachandra Yavagal and Parvathi Bai. Ramachandra was also a tabla player; he learnt tabla despite objections from his family. He hails from Dharwad district of Karnataka.

== Career ==
Yavagal started learning tabla at the age of 4 from his father, later from Veeranna Kamkar of Gayathri Gayana Shaala in Hubli and further vigorous training from Sheshagiri Hanagal. Lalji Gokhale mentored Yavagal. At the age of 10, he performed at Sawai Gandharva Music Festival in Kundgol where he was accompanied by Appa Jalgaonkar.

Following the death of Yavagal's father, he started receiving more opportunities to perform tabla. A year later, he started hosting baithaks (musical gatherings) at his residence in Hubli and dedicated the events to his father. According to him, when his family moved to Bangalore, he was unable to host the baithaks for about an year and only resumed in 2000 when he was able to find a bigger accommodating house in Bangalore's suburb of Jakkur.

In 1980s, he joined All India Radio, the national public radio broadcaster of India. As of November 2016, he works there as a grade one artist.

== Music concerts ==
A sample of tabla play by Yavagal

Yavagal played tabla in India and as well as internationally at music concerts – solo performances and also accompanied hundreds of instrumentalists and vocalists including several prominent artistes the likes of Ajoy Chakrabarty, Basavaraj Rajguru, Bhimsen Joshi, C. R. Vyas, Gangubai Hangal, Jasraj, Mallikarjun Mansur, Parveen Sultana, Rajan and Sajan Mishra and Salamat Ali Khan.

He also played in the concerts of Carnatic music maestros including M. Balamuralikrishna, T. N. Krishnan, Umayalpuram K. Sivaraman among others. Starting his career at an early age allowed him to work with artistes stretching five generations.

== Charitable activities ==
Yavagal, along with his friends, founded Sri Rama Kala Vedike Trust in 2006 in the memory of his father. The trust promotes Indian classical music, aid young artists with scholarships and provides financial help to artists in need. It also organizes various music concerts and festivals including an annual musical fest "Naada Namana" in the memory of Ramachandra Yavagal. Ravindra acts as the managing trustee. He also volunteers in organizing medical help for musicians in need of help and facilitates artistes.

== Teaching ==
Yavagal teaches tabla at his music school in Bangalore. Several of his students went on to become music teachers and performers, including Praveen D. Rao and Udayraj Karpur. According to vocalist Vinayak Torvi, Yavagal's school lies on the lines of Kallusakkare (transl. candy) gharana.

== Reception ==
Yavagal's play is described as having admirable clarity and a balance in the approach of beating the drums with both hands. Lalith J. Rao, an eminent Hindustani classical singer of the Agra gharana style, described Yavagal as "[a person who] is born for the tabla [and who] lives and breathes the tabla". His plays where he accompanied are generally received favourably by critics and connoisseurs alike.

== Awards ==
Yavagal received several honours. In 1995, the Government of Karnataka awarded him the Rajyotsava Award, the second highest civilian award of Karnataka. Karnataka Sangeeta Nritya Academy has conferred him with Karnataka Kalashri, a lifetime award, for the year 2016–17. The Government of India honoured him with Sangeet Natak Akademi Award, country's highest award in arts, for the year 2021.

== Personal life ==
Yavagal is married to Suvarna and has two sons – Kiran, also a tabla player, and Nayan, a singer. Kiran accompanies Ravindra at some of his performances.
