= Doreswamy Iyengar =

Indian Carnatic musician

- Born: Mysore Venkatesha Doreswamy Iyengar; 1920; Gaddavalli, Hassan, Kingdom of Mysore (now in Karnataka, India)
- Died: 28 October 1997 (aged 76–77); Bangalore, Karnataka, India
- Occupation: Musician
- Known for: Veena
- Children: D. Balakrishna
- Awards: Padma Bhushan; Sangeetha Kalanidhi

Mysore Venkatesha Doreswamy Iyengar (1920–1997) was a Carnatic musician and one of the greatest exponents of the veena in modern Indian history.

== Early life ==
Doreswamy Iyengar was born to a Tamil Hindu family in Gaddavalli, a village in the Hassan of the erstwhile Kingdom of Mysore (in present-day Karnataka, India). His grandfather, Janardhan, sang compositions of the Dasa saint-poets, including Purandaradasa. His father Venkatesh, a learned vainika and royal musician at the court of the Maharaja of Mysore.

He started learning the veena from his father at an early age and soon became a disciple of his father's friend Veena Venkatagiriyappa. Doreswamy performed in the presence of the then Maharaja, Krishna Raja Wadiyar IV, at the age of 12 for the first time. A few months later, he was appointed the junior vidwan in the palace orchestra. He then passed the examination in advanced theory of Western music conducted by the Trinity College London, and at the age of 16, was appointed as the court musician of Mysore, the youngest to win the honour. He was never interested in studies, managed to secure a Bachelor of Arts degree from Maharaja's College, Mysore, with the help of his friend, R. K. Narayan. He was married at the age of 12 to Sharadamma.

== Career ==
Iyengar gave his first public performance in 1943 at the Bangalore Gayana Samaja. He served as the Producer with the All India Radio (AIR) in Bangalore starting 1955. He was reluctant to carry on considering the bureaucratic and organisational demands of the post, and that he perform for the AIR at need, alongside auditioning and selecting musicians for the same. However, he was persuaded to stay by Semmangudi Srinivasa Iyer, who was a chief producer with the AIR based in Madras (now Chennai), assuring him of flexible hours and fewer burdens of administration. Iyendar put together Gita Bharati for the AIR, Bangalore, which juxtaposed the compositions of Tyagaraja and Muthuswami Dikshitar with the Bengali songs of Rabindranath Tagore, based on their musical structure. These unusual pieces had been composed by Tagore after his trip to southern India in the 1920s that included a visit to the Mysore court. Other programmes produced by Iyengar included those where he set to tunes to poems of many Kannada-language poets such G. S. Shivarudrappa, N. S. Lakshminarayan Bhat. Iyengar later became the first Kannadiga and vanika to perform for AIR's national programme.

Iyengar participated in music conferences including one in Shiraz, Iran, in 1969, where he was also invited to perform at the Shiraz Persepolis Festival of Arts as a guest artist. He performed at the Festivals of India event in Germany and the Soviet Union; in the latter, he presented his five veena recitals (pancha).

Concerts of Iyengar, accompanied by Chowdiah on the violin, became very popular. He also performed duets with other violinists such as Lalgudi Jayaraman, T. N. Krishnan and M. S. Gopalakrishnan, and vocalists such as M. Balamuralikrishna and K. V. Narayanaswamy. He participated in many Jugalbandis, including with popular Hindustani classical instrumentalists such as Ustad Ali Akbar Khan, Mallikarjun Mansur and Amjad Ali Khan. Iyengar was regularly accompanied on mridangam by V. S. Rajagopal. The noted vainika C. Krishnamurthy was one of Iyengar's main disciples, alongside his son D. Balakrishna.

Iyengar composed music for operas, notably to those of P. T. Narasimhachar, such as Gokula Nirgamana and Hamsa Damayanti. He also scored music for a few Kannada-language films, notably Subba Shastry (1966).

In an age when most of the other vainikas had started using the contact microphone, Iyengar stuck to the acoustic Veena. He was against amplification as he felt that it robbed the music of its nuances and often distorted the tone. Iyengar's style of playing is sometimes referred to as the Mysore style. This distinctive style is marked by the movements from one note to another being achieved with the playing fingers (the index and middle fingers of the left hand) parted. This, along with his prolonged, medieval string plucking style enabled him to achieve the continuity of sound.

Iyengar's son Balakrishna recalled that despite his father being "a purist, he listened to western music and Fritz Kreisler was one of his favorites. Members of his family recalled that his all-time favorite pieces were by German and Austrian musicians. The University of Mysore conferred upon Iyengar an honorary doctorate in 1975. Iyengar died of hepatitis C on 8 October 1997.

== Awards ==
Iyengar was awarded the Mysore State Sahitya Academy Award in 1970, the Padma Bhushan by the Government of India in 1983, the Sangeetha Kalanidhi of the Madras Music Academy in 1984, the Sangeetha Kalasikhamani of the Indian Fine Arts Society in 1994, the Sangeetha Kalarathna of the Bangalore Gayanasamaja, and the Chowdiah National Memorial Award.
