= Giridhar Udupa =

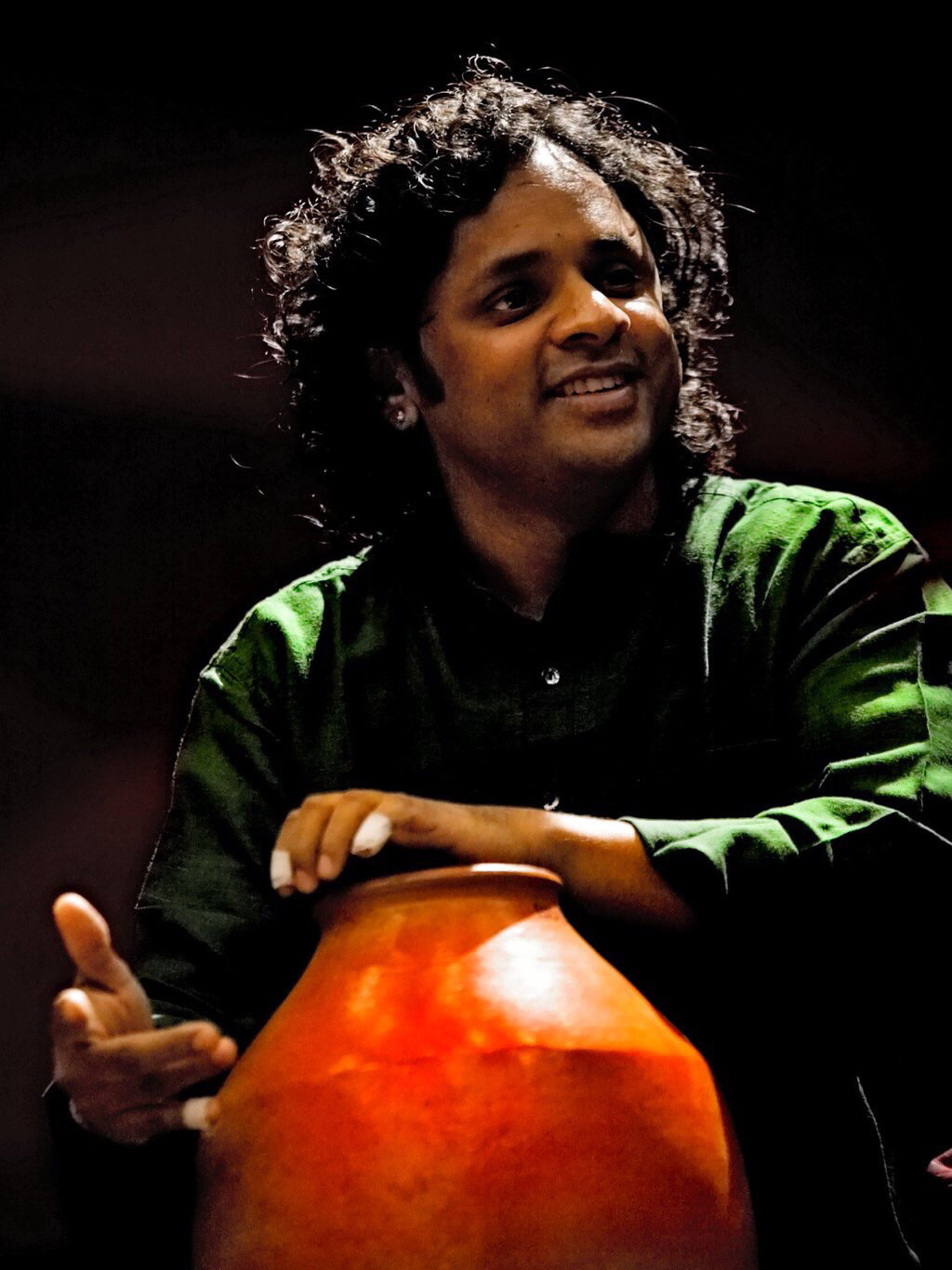
- Giridhar Udupa in concert

Background information
- Also known as: Ghatam Udupa, Ghatam Giridhar Udupa
- Born: Giridhar Udupa; 17 November 1979 (age 46)
- Origin: Bengaluru, Karnataka, India
- Genres: Carnatic classical music, fusion, world music
- Occupation: Ghatam Vidwan
- Instrument: Ghatam
- Member of: Layatharanga
- Website: www.ghatamudupa.com

Ghatam Giridhar Udupa (born 17 November 1979) (Kannada: ಘಟಂ ಗಿರಿಧರ್ ಉಡುಪ) is an Indian percussionist and a leading exponent of the ghatam. He is one of the members of Layatharanga, a team of Indian classical musicians who have embarked on the task of blending different forms of classical, folk and world music. In 2015 he founded and has since served as the director of The Udupa Foundation, a registered charitable trust with the aim of promoting music, performing arts and culture.

== Early life and tutelage ==
Udupa was born into a family of artists, and was exposed to music and literature from a very young age. He began his musical training at the age of four, under the guidance of his father and well known Mridangam artist Vidwan Ullur Nagendra Udupa. He ventured into the world of Carnatic music learning all the traditional percussion instruments (mridangam, ghatam, kanjira and morsing), but it was the Ghatam that struck a chord with his musical personality. He has since taken advanced lessons from Vidushi Ghatam Sukanya Ramgopal and Vidwan Ghatam V.Suresh mastering the finer aspects of the fingering techniques of the instrument.

== Education ==
Udupa holds a graduate degree in commerce from Bangalore University.

== Performing career ==
For Carnatic music Udupa performs primarily on the ghatam, but for other genres he incorporates varied South Indian percussion instruments into his performance, including mridangam, kanjira and morsing. He is also adept at rendering Konnakol, the vocal rendition of percussion syllables. He has accompanied artists of different styles of music such as Carnatic, fusion, and jazz, including Sarvashree Dr. L. Subramaniam, Dr. M.Balamuralikrishna, M. S. Gopalakrishnan, R. K. Srikantan, T. N. Krishnan, T. K. Murthy, Palghat Raghu, Umayalpuram K. Sivaraman, A.K.Palanivel, Ganesh and Kumaresh, Mysore Nagaraj & Mysore Manjunath, Mandolin Srinivas, Malladi Brother, N.Ramani, K. J. Yesudas, R. K. Padmanabha, T. V. Gopalakrishnan, T.V. Sankaranarayanan, Madhurai T.N. Seshagopalan, Trichur V. Ramachandran, Dr. Jayanthi Kumaresh, R.K. Suryanarayana, Bombay Jayashree and Sudha Raghunathan. He has undertaken several overseas musical tours, since 1998.

== Awards and accolades ==
- Nadajyothi Puruskara from Nadajyothi Sri Thyagaraja Swamy Bhajana Sabha, Bangalore – March 2015
- Best Upa Pakka Vadhyam Award from The Music Academy, Chennai – Jan 2015
- Madhura Murali Puraskar from the Dr. M. Balamuralikrishna at Chennai during his 82nd birthday celebration – 29 July 2012
- Lions International Award – 2011.
- Asthana Vidwan of the Sri Matam of Kanchi Kamakoti Peetam – 2010.
- Yuva Laya Prathibhamani title – 2009
- Rotary Youth Award – 2008
- CMANA Award 2007 (Carnatic Music Association Of North America) by Percussive Arts Centre, Bangalore
- Conferred with title "Yuva Kala Bharathi" by Bharath Kalachar, Chennai – 2004.
- Ananya Yuva Puraskara for the year 2002 as Best Percussionist of the year.
- Recipient of the prestigious Central Government Scholarship for Ghatam – 2002.
- Aryabhata Award – 2000.
- First Prize at the National Level All India Radio Competition – 2000.
- Best Ghatam Artist Award from Gayana Samaja, Ganakala Parishat and Malleshwaram Sangeetha Sabha for the years 1992, 1996 and 1999 respectively.
- Vijaya Kalashree title – 1997
- First Indian percussionist to perform and conduct workshop at the Krakow International Music festival – 2005.
