= T. B. Narasimhachar =

Indian singer and lyricist

Tirumazhisai Bhashyam Narasimhachar "Saragrahi" (15 April 1915 – 23 November 1988) was a well-known Carnatic music critic from Bangalore, India. He was born to Bhashyam Ramachar and Srirangamma in a Sri Vaishnava family.

== Contributions to Carnatic music ==
=== Music writer ===
From his childhood, he had a keen interest in music, harikatha, dance and drama forms of South India. Although he qualified to be a lawyer, Narasimhachar took up a clerical job at the Comptrollers’ Office in Bangalore due to family circumstances. While in this job, he started his musical journalism by writing a weekly column on music and musicians in the Kannada magazine Thaai Nadu. He later assumed the pen name "Saragrahi" and contributed music reviews, articles on Carnatic musicians and Carnatic Music history in many Kannada and English language journals like Samyukta Karnataka (1978–80), Kannada Prabha, The Indian Express, The Evening Herald, The Hindu, Shanmukha Magazine. (quarterly journal, published by Sri Shanmukhananda Fine Arts & Sangeetha Sabha), Nadopasana (Published by Malleswaram Sangeetha Sabha). Commissioned by the Karnataka Sangeeta Nritya Academy, he compiled and edited a series of books on artists of various music genres hailing from Karnataka, titled Namma Sangita Kalavidaru. He also compiled the "Namma Sugama Sangeetha Kalavidaru" and "Namma Nritya Kalavidaru" for the same organization.

=== Founder of Malleswaram Sangeetha Sabha ===
T. B.Narasimhachar was instrumental in establishing Malleswaram Sangeetha Sabha in 1948. This Sabha is the second oldest registered in Bangalore, the oldest being Gayana Samaja. He was its first secretary and continued to serve in various honorary capacities till he died. He established the Sabha firmly in the music scene by bringing in stalwarts to perform on a regular basis. Many up and coming musicians showcased their talent through this Sabha

=== Talent scout ===
Many talented young musicians were discovered or given a push in the right direction by him. He often held chamber music concerts at his own residence to promote new talent. Artists like R. Vedavalli, Bombay Sisters, T. A. S. Mani and T. S. Satyavati have acknowledged the vital role he played in bringing their talent to the notice of the cognoscenti.

== Awards ==
His contribution to the field of music criticism was acknowledged with the award of "Karnataka Kala Tilaka" title by the Karnataka Sangeeta Nritya Academy for the year 1985-86. He was also given the Karnataka state Rajyotsava award the same year.
