= Musicians of the kingdom of Mysore =

National musical tradition (1399 - 1950)

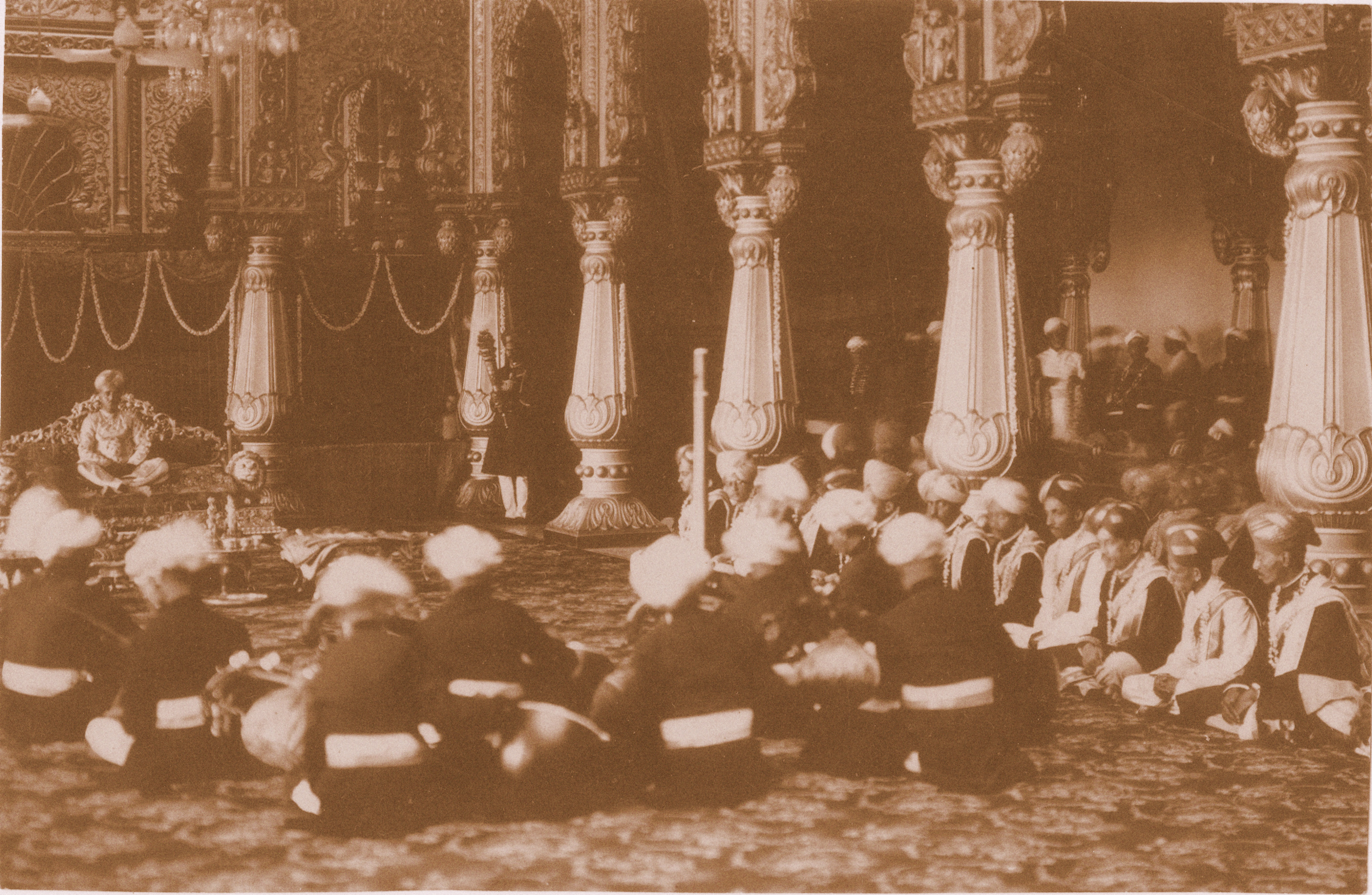
A concert in progress at the Mysore Palace

The kingdom of Mysore (1399–1950) was founded by Yaduraya in 1399 as a feudatory of the Vijayanagara Empire and became an independent kingdom in the early 17th century, after the decline of the Vijayanagara Empire. Many musicians and composers have presumably adorned the courts of the Mysore kings from Yaduraya's time, furthering the Dakshinadi school (southern school) of music that had developed in earlier centuries. However, records are only available from the time of King Ranadheera Kanteerava Narasaraja Wodeyar (1638). Musical treatises surviving from this time, though, provide ample information on the music, musical instruments, the types of compositions, the raga (melodies) and the tala (rhythms) used. Though all the Mysore kings patronised music, the golden age of Carnatic music was considered to be during the reigns of Kings Krishnaraja Wodeyar III (1794–1868), Chamaraja Wodeyar IX (1862–1894), Krishnaraja Wodeyar IV (1884–1940) and Jaya Chamaraja Wodeyar (1919–1974). The reign of Krishnaraja Wodeyar IV is regarded as particularly important in musical terms.

The instruments normally used to play compositions were the veena, the rudra veena, the violin, the tambura, the ghatam, the flute, the mridangam, the nagaswaram, and the Swarabat. Instruments such as the harmonium, the sitar and the jaltarang, though uncommon to the southern region, came into use and British influence popularised the saxophone and the piano. The royalty of this dynasty were noted composers and proficient in playing musical instruments both solo and in concert with others. The different styles of compositions included jati swara, swara jati, varna, kriti, javali (a light lyric), tillana and pallavi. It was not unusual for the composers and the kings who patronised them to be experts at instrumental music as well. So proficient were the musicians at their chosen instrument(s) that the name of the instrument became a part of the musician's name, examples being Veena Subbanna and Veena Sheshanna, Veena (or Veene as it is known in South India) being their instrument. During these times, Tanjore in modern Tamil Nadu and Mysore in modern Karnataka were the centres of Carnatic music. Mysore developed a distinct school of music which gave importance to the raga and the bhava. Though many of the musicians in the courts were natives of the Mysore kingdom, artists from other parts of South India were also patronised. Another important development of this period was the growth of drama. These dramas, original or translated from English and Sanskrit classics, contained many melodious songs and were brought to the stage through the various drama schools established by royalty.

== King Krishnaraja Wodeyar III (1794–1868) ==
Mysore Musicians (1638–1947)
Vaikunta Dasaru	1680
Veena Venkata Subbiah	1750
Shunti Venkataramaniah	1780
Mysore Sadashiva Rao	1790
Krishnaraja Wodeyar III	1799–1868
Aliya Lingaraja Urs	1823–1874
Chikka Lakshminaranappa
Pedda Lakshminaranappa
Devalapurada Nanjunda
Veena Shamanna	1832–1908
Veena Padmanabiah	1842–1900
Veena Sheshanna	1852–1926
Mysore Karigiri Rao	1853–1927
Sosale Ayya Shastry	1854–1934
Veena Subbanna	1861–1939
Mysore Vasudevachar	1865-1961
Bidaram Krishnappa	1866–1931
T. Pattabhiramiah	1863
Jayarayacharya	1846-1906
Giribhattara Tammayya	1865–1920
Nanjangud Subba Shastry	1834–1906
Chandrashekara Shastry
Chinniah	1902
Veena Subramanya Iyer	1864–1919
Muthiah Bhagavatar	1877–1945
Veena Shivaramiah	1886–1946
Veena Venkatagiriappa	1887–1952
Srinivasa Iyengar	1888–1936
Chikka Ramarao	1891–1945
T. Chowdiah	1894–1967
Jayachamaraja Wodeyar	1919–1974
Dr. B. Devendrappa	1899–1986
G. Narayana Iyengar	1903–1959
T. Subramanya Iyer
Anavatti Rama Rao	1860
Tiger Varadachariar	1876–1950
Chennakeshaviah	1895–1986
T. Krishna Iyengar	1902–1997
S. N. Mariappa	1914–1986
C. Ramchandra Rao	1916–1985
R. N. Doreswamy	1916–2002
Dr. V. Doraiswamy Iyengar	1920–1997
Vaidyalinga Bhagavatar	1924–1999

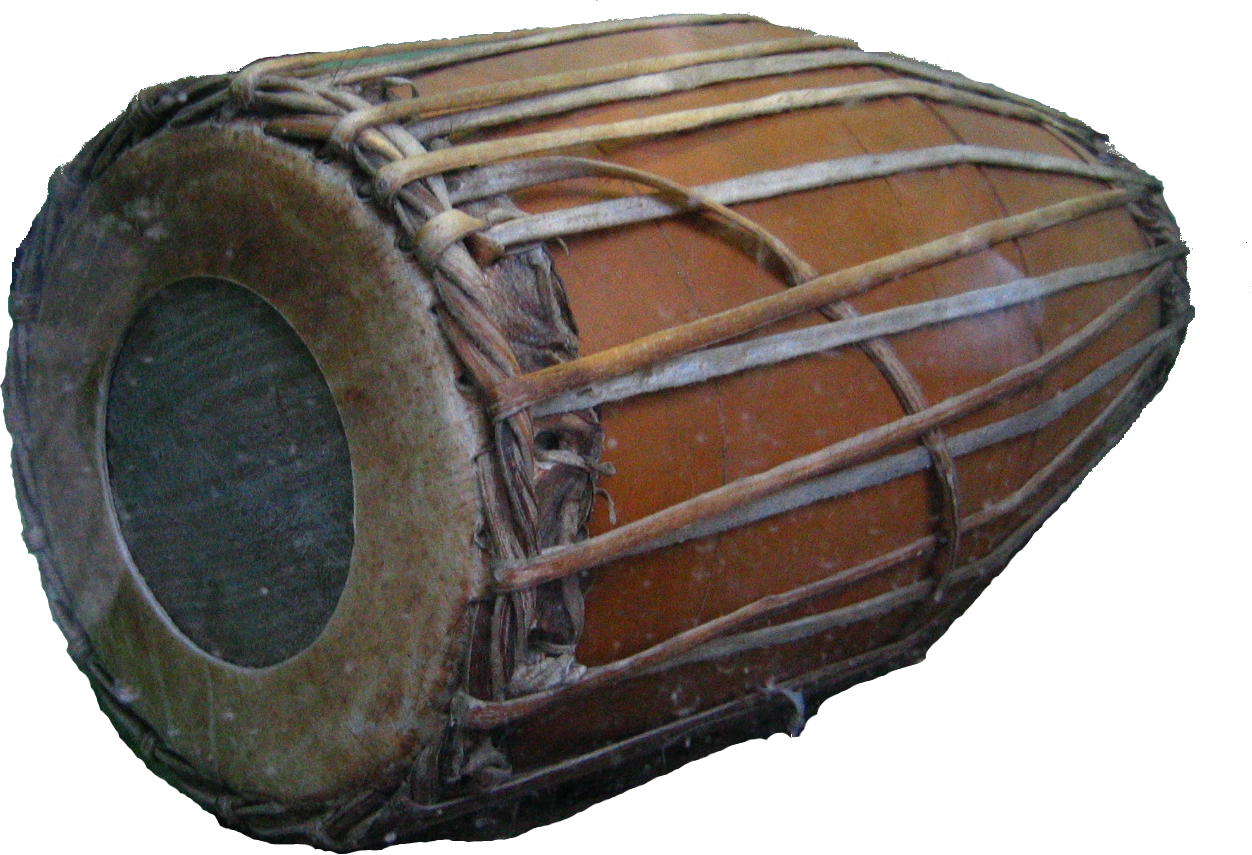
Mridangam

This period heralded the beginning of British control over the administration of Mysore and the start of an important period in the development of vocal and instrumental Carnatic music in south India. King Krishnaraja Wodeyar III was a trained musician, musicologist and composer of merit. Being a devotee of the Hindu goddess Chamundeshwari, he wrote all his compositions under the mudra (pen name) "'Chamundi'" or "'Chamundeshwari'". He composed many philosophically themed javali (light lyric) and devotional songs in the Kannada language under the title Anubhava pancharatna. Javali in Carnatic music have their roots in Mysore and are first mentioned in the king's writings as javadi. His scholarship in Kannada is acclaimed and his compositions are seen as parallels to the vachana poems of the Virashaiva poets and to the devotional songs (pada) of the Haridasas of Karnataka. Mysore Sadashiva Rao was born in Greemspet in the Chittoor district of modern Andhra Pradesh to a Maharashtrian family. He came to Mysore between 1825 and 1835 and served as a court musician to the incumbent king for nearly fifty years. His compositions are said to have been in the hundreds, though only about one hundred, written in Sanskrit and Telugu under the pen name "Sadashiva", still exist. He is known as the reviver of Carnatic music in the Karnataka region.

Veena Venkatasubbiah came from a Mysorean family of famous veena artists ( or "vainika") of the time of King Haider Ali and belonged to the Badaganadu community. He was appointed music teacher to King Krishnaraja Wodeyar III by his minister (or "Dewan") Purniah, who wanted to make Mysore the cultural centre of south India just as Vijayanagara had been during the rule of the Vijayanagara Empire. His most famous composition is the Sapta taleshwari gite. Some historians claim the work was a combined effort by the king and the musician. The king's son-in-law, Aliya Lingraj Urs, was an authority and composer in both the Kannada and Sanskrit languages. A native of Heggadadevanakote (in modern Mysore district), he had several interests in the fine arts. He has over fifty works including compositions, dramas, and Yakshagana to his credit, all of which were written with a pen name beginning with "Linga", such as "Lingendra" or "Lingaraja". His most famous compositions in Kannada are titled "Chandravali jogi hadu", "Pancha vimshati leele" and "Amba kirtana", and in Sanskrit, the "Shringara lahari".

Shunti Venkataramaniah was a musician from Tiruvayyar (modern Tamil Nadu) and an expert at playing the tambura. He was introduced to the king by the court musician Veena Venkatasubbiah under unusual circumstances. When Venkataramaniah first met Veena Venkatasubbiah, the latter asked him to sing a particular tune. Unable to sing it, Venkataramaniah walked away, only to return a year later having mastered the tune. While singing the tune, Venkataramaniah went into a trance and the court musician hurried to the palace and requested the king to be audience to the singer. The king arrived there and was so pleased with Venkataramaniah's voice he appointed him as a court musician. Venkataramaniah's most famous composition is the Lakshana gite.

Chinniah was the eldest son of a family known as the "Tanjore quartet", a quartet of brothers who were singers and composers. Before his arrival in Mysore, Chinniah served at the court of the Tanjore kings Sarabhoji II and Shivaji II. He had learnt music from Muthuswamy Dikshitar. At the court of the king of Mysore, Chinniah created several compositions in praise of his patron king and the local deity Chamundeshwari. Famous among these compositions are Ninnu koriyunna, Vanajalochana, Nivanti, Chakkani na mohanaguni, Manavigai konarada and several javali.

Veena Chikka Lakshminaranappa, an expert vainika, was a descendant of Krishnappa, a Mysore court musician during the time of Bettada Chamaraja Wodeyar in the 16th century. Chikka Lakshminaranappa became the chief musician in the Prasanna Krishnaswamy temple located within the palace premises. His two sons Krishnappa and Seenappa, who were later patronised by the kings of Mysore, were also proficient players of the veena and violin. Well known visiting musicians to the court during this time included Pallavi Gopalayyar, Veena Kuppayyar, Tiruvattiyur Thyagayyar, Veena Krishnayya and Suryapurada Ananda Dasaru.

== King Chamaraja Wodeyar IX (1868–1894) ==
King Chamaraja Wodeyar IX was also a patron of the fine arts and literature, having been tutored by his own court musicians Veena Sheshanna and Veena Subbanna. The king was well versed in the violin and often participated, along with other musicians, in violin performances at the Krishna temple located in the palace premises. He is known to have helped many budding artists, both by patronage of their talent and in their personal difficulties. He sponsored Mysore Vasudevacharya (who later became a famous musician) to train at Tiruvayyar under the famous Patnam Subramanya Iyer. He also formed the "Amateur Drama Club" to encourage young artists. However, he died at the early age of 32 while travelling in Kolkata. Veena Shamanna was the son of Rama Bhagavatar, an immigrant from Tanjore who came to Mysore during a famine, seeking royal patronage. His birth name was Venkata Subramanya. In 1876, Veena Shamanna was appointed court musician for his talent in both vocal and instrumental classical music. He was known as "Tala Brahma" for his mastery of the veena, violin, ghata and swarabhat. A conservative artist, he played by the norms of theorical classical music and was a tutor to the royal family. In honour of his achievements, a street in Mysore city was named after him. His compositions were published by his son Veena Subramanya Iyer in a book called Sangeeta samayasara in 1915.

Veena Padmanabiah, a native of Sriramapura (also known as Budihalu in Chikkanayakanahalli taluk, Karnataka), was trained in classical vocal and veena in his early days by a disciple of Veena Shamanna. Later, under the guidance of Veena Shamanna, Padmanabiah's expertise grew. An incident at the king's palace during his youth made him popular and impressed the king. A well-known musician called Veena Sambayya made a mistake in interpreting a shloka in the musical treatise Sangeeta Ratnakara. Padmanabiah immediately pointed out this error, much to the discomfort of Sambayya, while the rest of the musicians dared not to, out of fear of incurring the senior musician's wrath. Years later, pleased by his talent, the king appointed him to the court and bestowed upon him the title "Mahatapi Khillat". Padmanabiah also served in the same capacity under the next king, Chamaraja Wodeyar IX. He was a music teacher at the "Mysore Maharanis High School", at the "Maharajas Sanskrit School", and he also tutored the royal family. He wrote many compositions in Sanskrit, Telugu and Kannada under the pen name "Padmanaba".

Veena Sheshanna, considered one of the greatest exponents of the veena in India, was born in Mysore in 1852 to Bakshi Chikkaramappa, a court musician of King Krishnaraja Wodeyar III. Once a visiting musician sang a composition (pallavi) and challenged the musicians in the king's court to follow. While none of the senior musicians could sing that composition, Sheshanna, who was still a boy, sang it correctly. Impressed, the king gave the boy a chain of pearls he was wearing and a pair of shawls. It was during the rule of King Chamaraja Wodeyar IX in 1882 that Sheshanna was appointed court musician. His achievements in classical music won Mysore a premier place in the art of playing the veena and he was given the title "Vainika Shikhamani" by King Krishnaraja Wodeyar IV. Veena Sheshanna won laurels and titles from kings and dignitaries including the kings of Travencore, Baroda and Tanjore. He played the veena at the Indian National Congress in Belagavi in 1924 to an audience comprising such leaders as Mahatma Gandhi, Pandit Nehru and others and received the title "Vainika Chakravarthi". A photograph of Veena Sheshanna was taken by King George V to be placed in the art gallery at Buckingham Palace. Sheshanna was proficient at other instruments, including the violin, swarabhat, rudra veena, jalatarang and even the piano, in which he is known to have composed in English. His compositions are largely in Telugu and Kannada, though he also occasionally composed in Hindi.

Mysore Karigiri Rao was the son of Lakshmi Narasimhacharya, who hailed from Tumkur and was a Sanskrit Pandit in the court of King Krishnaraja Wodeyar III. Karigiri Rao learnt music secretly because his family was against that profession. He later travelled, performing in many places before returning to Mysore at the age of fifty when he was appointed court musician by King Chamaraja Wodeyar IX. He was given the title "Sangeeta Vidya Kanteerava" by senior musicians of the day and "Ganakara Durandhara Sangeeta Bhushana" by the king himself. He is credited with writing several Carnatic compositions and more than 200 devaranama (devotional songs). Veena Subbanna was born in 1861 in Mysore into a wealthy family of musicians to which he was the only heir. He studied with Prince Chamaraja Wodeyar IX at the Royal school and was well versed in the English language. He was trained in Carnatic vocal music by Mysore Sadashiva Rao and in instrumental music by his father Dodda Sheshanna who was also a famous musician. Veena Subbanna was appointed court musician in 1888 and was a contemporary of the legendary Veena Sheshanna, with whom he was paired in many concerts. A generous man known for his philanthropic deeds, he has many compositions to his credit and earned such titles as "Vainika Praveena", "Vainika Vara Choodamani" and "Vainika Kesari".

Mysore Vasudevacharya was a musician and composer born on 28 May 1865 in Mysore. He holds the unique distinction of having been patronised by four generations of Mysore kings and of having been court musician to three. He received royal patronage from the age of five owing to his talent. During his time in Sanskrit school, he learned to play the veena from ace musician Veena Padmanabiah. Later, King Krishnaraja Wodeyar IV sponsored him to learn music at Tiruvayyar under Patnam Subramania Iyer. A master of both Carnatic and Hindustani raga, he delivered the opening Sanskrit shloka (devotional songs) at the Indian National Congress convention at Belagavi in 1924. He represented Mysore in the "Akhila Bharateeya Sangeeta Parishat" concert held in Gwalior. He earned laurels and titles from kings and dignitaries from all over India, including the "Sangeeta Shastra Ratna" and "Sangeeta Shastra Visharada". Numerous compositions in Sanskrit and Telugu are credited to him, as well as one song in Kannada called Karunisou under the pen name "Vasudeva".

Bidaram Krishnappa was a Konkani Brahmin and a native of Nandalike in modern Udupi district, Karnataka. When he was a boy he had a chance encounter with a rich businessman who loved music. This happened when hungry Krishnappa, who came from a poor family, was singing a devotional song (devaranama) in a local temple. Impressed with his voice, the merchant sponsored Krishnappa to train under the guidance of a musician called Ramaswamy. He later came under the influence of Tammayya and Veena Sheshanna. Bidaram Krishnappa is credited with having popularised the singing of Kannada devaranama on stage. He adapted certain concepts of Hindustani music into his Carnatic compositions. For his scholarship in music, he earned the titles "Shudda Swaracharya", "Pallavi Krishnappa" and "Gana Visharada". One of his disciples, T. Chowdiah, went on to become a music legend. Krishnappa was most famous for writing and rendering devaranama and kirtans.

Among other well-known composers of the time, Tiruppunandal Pattabhiramiah from Kumbakonam was well known for his javali, with more than fifty to his credit written mostly in Kannada and Telugu under the pen name of "Talavana". Sosale Ayya Shastry was a native of Sosale (in modern Mysore district). His father Garalapuri Shastry was a leading Sanskrit scholar in the court of King Krishnaraja Wodeyar III, and had later served as teacher to Chamaraja Wodeyar. While not a musician, Garalapuri Shastry had close associations with many musicians, and is believed to have helped Aliya Lingaraje Urs with his composition Sringara Lahari in raga Nilambari. Garalapuri Shastry's ancestors had been ministers in Anegondi province (modern Koppal district, Karnataka). Ayya Shastry, too, served as a Kannada and Sanskrit teacher to the royal family. He was also noted for his musical and painting abilities and was given the titles Maha Vidwan in 1905 and Kavi Tilaka in 1912 by King Krishnaraja Wodeyar IV. Among his well-known dramas in Kannada are Karnataka vikramorvasheya natakam, Karnataka ramayana natakam, Karnataka nala charitre and Karnataka pratapa simha nataka with numerous melodious songs in them. Ayya Shastry also authored the well-known composition Svami Devane Loka Paalane, which was widely used as a school prayer. In the late 19th-early 20th century, Jayarayacharya (1846–1906) composed Kalyana Gitavali containing more than fifty devotional songs to be sung in the king's court and at festivals, and prayers by women; the dramatist Giribhattara Tamayya (1865) wrote the well-known works Gaya charitre, Droupadi swayamvara, Neeti chudamani, Virata parva and Sudhanva charitre under the pen name "Tammayya". Nanjangud Subba Shastry was a native of Nanjangud (near Mysore). Apart from composing about thirty-five songs, he wrote musical dramas in Kannada and Sanskrit including Mricchakatika and Malavikagnimitra. Chandrashekara Shastry composed Javali in Kannada and Telugu under the pen name "Balachandra". Visiting musicians were Pallavi Sheshayyar, Maha Vaidyanatha Iyer and Patnam Subramanyam Iyer.

== King Krishnaraja Wodeyar IV (1884–1940) ==
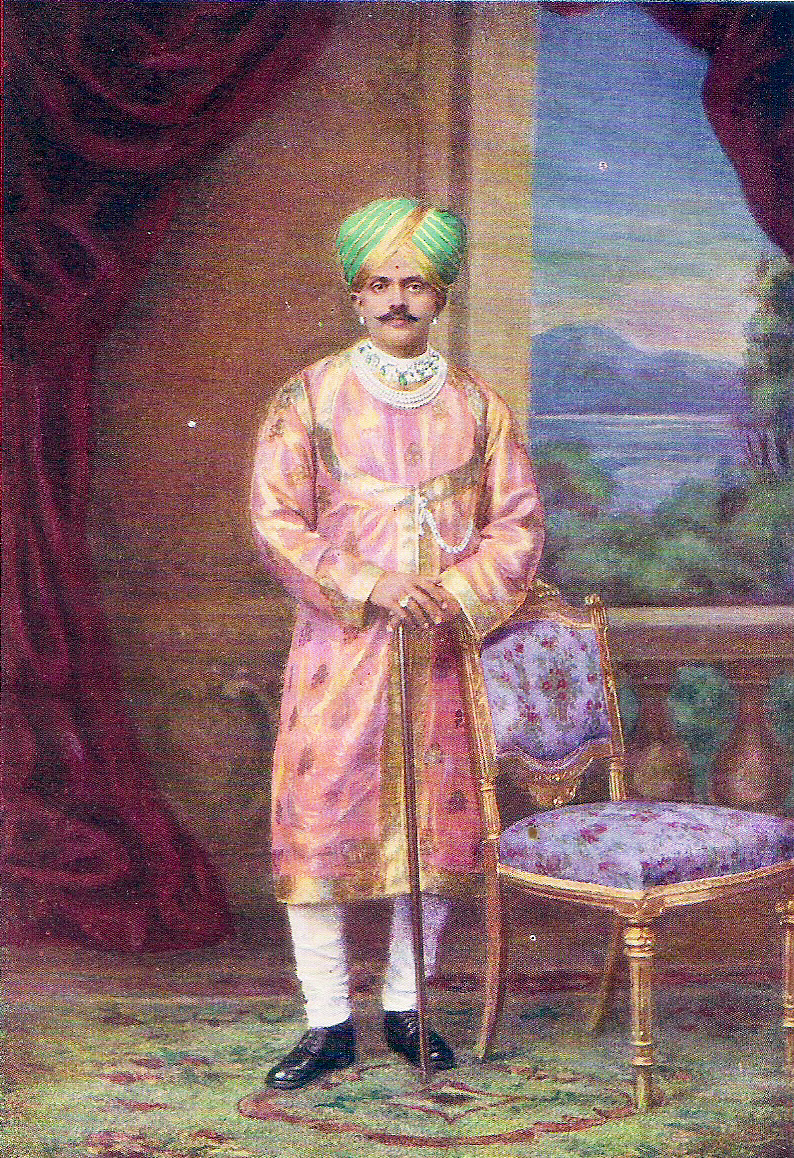
King Krishnaraja Wodeyar IV

This period, as during the time of the predecessor king, was an important era of music in Mysore, especially for Kannada compositions. The King himself was educated in Kannada, English, Sanskrit, the sciences and was knowledgeable in Tamil and Urdu as well. He was well versed in playing musical instruments including the veena, violin, mridangam, nagaswara, sitar, and harmonium as well as Western instruments such as the saxophone and piano. He encouraged his musicians to compose in the Carnatic, Hindustani and Western styles. During this period, Veena Subramanya Iyer wrote an important treatise on music in Kannada, dealing with both its theoretical and practical aspects, called Sangeeta Samayasara which was published in 1915. A very influential musician, academic and composer of this period was Harikeshanallur Dr. L. Muthiah Bhagavatar. A native of Tirunalveli (in modern Tamil Nadu), he was a scholar in Sanskrit and was trained in music by Samabasiva Iyer in Tiruvayyar. He was appointed court musician at Mysore in 1927 and was honoured by kings and notables alike. He was given the title "Gayaka Shikamani" by his patron King Krishnaraja Wodeyar IV. To this famous musician are credited one hundred and eight Chamundeswari kritis in Kannada, one hundred and eight Shivashtottara compositions in Sanskrit, an important treatise on music in Tamil called the "Sangeeta Kalpadrumam", and a biography in Sanskrit on the life, achievements and contributions of Tyagaraja to Carnatic music called Srimat Tyagaraja Vijaya. He wrote a total of over four hundred compositions in all, in Sanskrit, Kannada, Telugu and Tamil under the pen name "Harikesha" and started the "Tyagaraja Sangeeta Vidyalaya" ("Tyagaraja School of Music") in 1920. For his accomplishments, he was given the title of "Sangeeta Kalanidhi" by the Madras Music Academy and received an honorary Doctor of Letters degree from the University of Travencore. Muthiah Bhagavatar died in Mysore in 1945 and is considered one of the most important composers of the post- Tyagaraja period.

Veena Shivaramiah was the son of the Mysore musician Veena Padmanabiah (of Chikkanayakanahalli taluk, Karnataka). Shivaramiah learnt to play the veena from his father and later from Mysore Karigiri Rao and Mysore Vasudevacharya and was appointed court musician in 1900 by King Krishnaraja Wodeyar IV. His one hundred Carnatic compositions are in Telugu, Kannada and Sanskrit, while his Western musical compositions are in English. King Jayachamaraja Wodeyar gave him the title "Vainika Praveena" in 1941. Shivaramiah was also a Kannada writer and co-authored works with such well-known Kannada scholars as Devottama Jois, Anavatti Rama Rao and Krishna Shastry. Veena Venkatagiriappa, a native of Heggadadevanakote (in modern Mysore district) and a student of Veena Sheshanna, became a court musician under unusual circumstances. At the end of the very first concert that Venkatagiriappa gave in the king's presence, the king merely gave him a gift of two Indian rupees and left the concert. The musician and his family were disappointed at the king's response. Later the king learnt from one of his attendants that the musician and his family had taken the gift graciously. The king, who had been testing the musician's attitude to music, was pleased and appointed Venkatagiriappa court musician. Over the years, the king gave Venkatagiriappa more responsibility in the functioning of various schools of fine arts in his kingdom. Venkatagiriappa played the veena for fifteen minutes in a well-known documentary movie called "Musical Instruments of India" in 1935. He was given the title "Vainika Praveena". His compositions are in Kannada, Telugu and Sanskrit, and he is credited with having created a new kind of Carnatic composition called nagma, which resemble the gats of Hindustani music.

Belakavadi Srinivasa Iyengar, whose birth name was Kuppaswamy Iyengar, was a native of Srigiripura near Shivaganga (in modern Tumkur district). He came to Mysore in 1912 and was trained in music by Bakshi Subbanna, a musician in the court of King Krishnaraja Wodeyar IV. Srinivasa Iyengar was later appointed a court musician. He was an expert in the gottuvadyam and the violin. He was given the title "Mysurina Madhurayi Pushpavanam" by the famous vocalist Subramanya Iyer. Srinivasa Iyengar was a noted dramatist and acted in such well-known dramas as Babruvahana, Rama pattabhisheka, Veera simha charitre, Abhignana shakuntala, Virata charitre, and Sudhanva charitre. Unfortunately, very few of his compositions, which written under the pen name "Srinivasa", are available today. It was Srinivasa Iyengar who popularised Purandara Dasa's Kannada song Jagadoddharana by composing its notation. Chikka Rama Rao, a native of Kurudi (in modern Kolar district) was trained under Mysore Karigiri Rao. He was proficient in both the Kannada and Sanskrit languages, and among musical instruments, in the veena, glass tarang and jalatarang. He gained expertise in Western music as well. He is known to have had the gift of playing the veena while singing in a melodious voice. His talent was noticed by the "Raj maata" (queen mother) who brought this to the attention of the king. After listening to him perform, the king appointed him court musician in 1914. Along with Srinivasa Iyengar, Chikka Rama Rao acted in many dramas of the day and was honoured by King Krishnaraja Wodeyar IV with the title "Sangeeta Ratna" (literally, "gem of music") and "pandit" by Hindustani music aces Abdul Karim Khan and Bhaskara Bhuva. To his credit are many compositions in Kannada, Sanskrit and Telugu.

T. Chowdiah, a towering personality in the field of Carnatic music, was born on 1 January 1894 in Tirumakudalu Narasipura (or T. Narasipura, near Mysore). At the age of seven, he received training from Pakkanna and later under T. Subbanna. At the age of sixteen, he was tutored by Bidaram Krishnappa for eighteen years at the end of which Chowdiah emerged as an accomplished violinist. The ambidextrous Chowdiah is known to have played music with all the famous musicians of his day. In 1939, he was appointed court musician by King Krishnaraja Wodeyar IV and received such titles as "Sangeeta Ratna", "Sangeeta Kalanidhi" and "Ganakala Sindhu". He is credited with many compositions in Kannada, Telugu and Sanskrit under the pen name "Trimakuta" (the Sanskrit name for his home town). Dr. B. Devedrappa, a native of Ayanoor in Shivamogga district, was well versed in playing the veena, violin, jalatarang and dilruba. He was a student of the famous Veena Sheshanna and also of Bidaram Krishnappa. He was proficient at the harmonium, flute, ghatam and sitar. He was appointed as a jalatarang player in the court of King Krishnaraja Wodeyar IV and served the palace orchestra as a vocalist and violinist. The titles "Gana Visharada" and "Sangeeta Kalaratna" were bestowed upon him by the king. Later, in 1972, an honorary doctorate was awarded to him. Other famous musicians in the court were Gotuvadyam Narayana Iyengar of Tirunaveli (Tamil Nadu), Tiruvayyar Subramanya Iyer, and Anavatti Rama Rao of Anavatti (in Shivamogga district) who was a scholar, poet and dramatist. The credit of translating many of Tyagaraja's compositions into Kannada goes to him.

== King Jayachamaraja Wodeyar ==
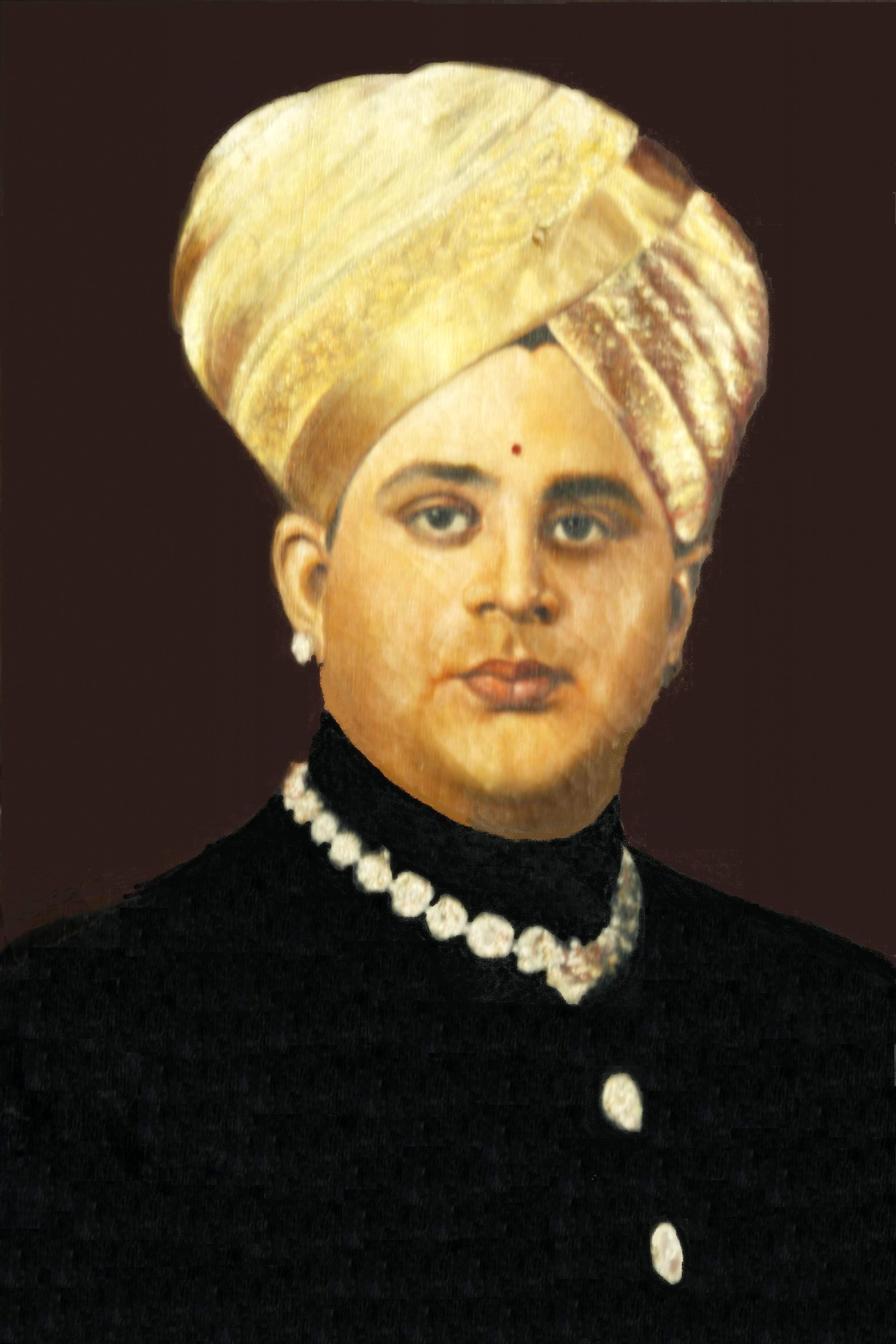
Maharaja Jaya Chamaraja Wodeyar

King Jayachamaraja Wodeyar was the last king of the Wodeyar dynasty. An avid fan of music, he was well trained in classical Western music and was an expert pianist. It was only during the later part of his life that he became interested in Carnatic classical music. Several compositions of the Russian composer Medtner were recorded by the king and made available to the public. For his contributions, he was awarded an honorary doctorate and was made a fellow of "Sangeet Natak Academy" (an academy of music and drama). Many important musicians were part of the king's court. Tiger Varadachariar, a native of Kaladipet (modern Tamil Nadu) moved initially to T. Narasipura where he performed music for some years. Later he moved back to Chennai where he served in various music schools. In 1916, he got an opportunity to sing in the presence of King Krishnadavaraja IV. Impressed with this musician's mastery over his art, the king gave him the title "Tiger" In 1944, Varadachariar was appointed court musician at Mysore. He has about eighty compositions to his credit. Chennakeshaviah, a native of Natanhalli (in modern Mandya district) was a Kannada pandit and court musician in 1944. Apart from his compositions, he wrote articles, published three volumes on haridasa compositions, and wrote a book on music. Other well-known musicians of the time were Dr. V Doraiswamy Iyengar(Veena Doreswamy Iyengar), Titte Krishna Iyengar, S. N. Mariappa, a native of Sasalu village (in modern Mandya district), Chintalapalli Ramachandra Rao, R. N. Doreswamy, a native of Rudrapatna (in modern Hassan district) and Vaidyalinga Bhagavatar.

== See also ==
- Jayachamaraja Wodeyar Bahadur
- Chamaraja Wodeyar
- Krishnaraja Wodeyar IV
