= Praveen D. Rao =

Indian musician

- Occupations: Multi-instrumentalist, composer, lyricist

Praveen D. Rao is an Indian musician, music director and a lyricist for Kannada language songs. He is based in Bangalore, India and plays the keyboard, tabla, and other instruments.

== Early life ==
He was trained by R. V. Sheshadri Gawai of Aravinda Sangeetha Vidyalaya and tabla player Ravindra Yavagal. Rao has composed music for plays, ballets, films, television shows and commercials.

== Music direction ==
=== Serials ===
- Sanghatane – directed by Sri Bhargava
- 67 Harris Road
- Vasantha Gaana
- Nighuda Jagatthu – directed by Sri Amardev
- Sri Ramakrishna Paramahamsa – directed by Praveen Nayak
- Chandamama Chakkulimama
- Chandrabimba
- Sahana
- Beladingalagi Baa
- Laali – directed by A. G. Sheshadri
- Asare
- Antharagange
- Sanje Mallige
- Muktha (telefilm) – directed by Srinivas Prabhu
- Ardhasathya
- Godhuli
- Tulasi – directed by Sunil Kumar Singh
- Kapinipati
- Venkata Ramana Govinda
- Baduku – for Nagendra Shah
- Seete – directed by Ashok Kashyap
- Guptagaamini – directed by Ramesh Kumar
- Red Box
- Maatagaathi
- Santheli Mane
- Aadimanassillada Marga
- Kacheri Kanda
- Tunturu
- Ankura
- Shikara
- Shiva Leelaamrutha
- Shiva Charithaamrutha
- Gangotri
- Lakumi
- Gaalipata
- Kalyana Rekhe
- Bombeyaatavayya
- Chitte Heeje
- Yashode
- Mithuna Raashi
- Kulavadhu
- Lakshmi Baaramma
- Kannadathi

=== Films ===
- Z – for Praveen Nayak
- Sumangali – A. G. Seshadri
- Nanage Neenu Ninage Naanu – for Anitha Subramanya
- Stumble – for Prakash Belawadi (won the National Award for Best English Feature Film of the year 2002)
- Kanakambari – for Dinesh Babu
- Chitra Vichitra – for Sushma, Akanksha Combines
- Dildaara – directed by Amar
- Manthana – by Srinath Vasistha
- Mana Manthana – by Suresh Heblikar
- Hondisi Bareyiri – directed by Ramenahalli Jagannatha

== Original scores for dance and theatre ==
=== Midlands Art Centre, UK ===
- Princess Aubergine (1995)

=== Chitraleka Dance Company, UK ===
- Panchatantra (1994)
- Kaishiki (1995)
- Ramayana (1996)
- Conference of Birds (2002)

=== Indira Thiagarajah, London ===
- Bimba Pratibimba (1993)

=== Abhinava Dance Company, Bangalore ===
- Datta Mahima
- Dwadashatma (1994)
- Spirit of Dance (1995)
- Manini (1995)
- Samarpan Sweekar (1998)
- Saath Saat (2000)
- Shringar Raam (2001)
- Prem Shanthi (2002)
- Nigah (2003)
- Ta Dha (2004)
- Mushti (2005)
- Tad Bharatham (2019)

=== Monica, Belgium ===
- Patanjali Yoga Sutra (2000)
- Meera (2003)

=== Radha Sridhar, Bangalore ===
- Meghadootha (1999)

=== Prabhath International, Bangalore ===
- Srinivasa Kalyana (2000)
- Shila Baalika (2001)
- Flute Fantasy (2001)
- Piscean Passion (2002)

=== Prabhat Kalavidaru, Bangalore ===
- Cinderella
- Karunamaya Shiva

=== Nadam Academy of Performing Arts ===
- Antardhwani

=== Rasika Dance Academy ===
- Yatra
- Devanga Mahima

=== Piali Ray, UK ===
- Shyama (1993) – Rabindranath Tagore's Musical

=== Sampad Yuva, UK ===
- A Breath of Life
- Inequality (1993)

=== M. P. Suma, Bangalore ===
- Omkaara
- Vijaya Kalyana
- Vachana Vybhava

=== STEM contemporary dance theatre, Bangalore ===
- Crows – Caws – Facades (1995)

=== Gig Payne, UK ===
- Conversations – Performing Abilities of the Multiple Disabled (1994)

=== Pampa Dance Academy, USA ===
- Prakriti (2004)

=== Sandesha, Mangalore ===
- Life of Jesus (2002)
- Jyothirgamaya (2003)

=== Padmini Ravi, Bangalore ===
- Tamtana (2004)

=== ISKCON, Bangalore ===
- Chaitanya Mahaprabhu (2004)

=== Supriya Desai, USA ===
- Mahishasura Mardini
- Sri Krishna Parijatha (2003)

=== Maya Rao, Natya Institute of Kathak and Choreography, Bangalore ===
- Yashodara (2004)
- The Dust of Brij (2003)
- Sare Jahan Se Accha (July 2005)

=== Pushpanjali, Manchester ===
- Snow White (2004)
- Ramayana (July 2005)

=== Ramakrishna Vidyashala, Mysore ===
- Nritya Sangeeth Bharathi (2004)
- Sarva Dharma Samanvayacharya Sri Ramakrishna (2004)

=== Guy Hutchins, Moby Duck Theatre Company, UK ===
- Maze Maker (March 2004)
- Bopoluchi (November 2004)
- Fire Girl (January 2005)
- Bloodhands (August 2005)
- Granny Vampire (August 2006)

=== Sampradaya Dance Creations, Toronto ===
- Vivarta (March 2005)
- Shoonya
- Pralaya

=== North West Dance Alliance, Manchester ===
- Devi Diva (July 2005)

=== Threeaksha, Philadelphia, USA ===
- Abhika (2005–2006)
- Prayog (2007)
- Natya Shastra (2018)

== Performances ==
Rao has performed at national and international festivals including Pattadakal Festival, Navaraspur Festival, Lord Mayor's Cultural Event 1994 (Birmingham), World Veerashaiva Conference 1997 (USA), World Konkani Conference 2002 (Texas), Soorya Festival, and Nishagandhi Festival. He has toured India and abroad performing and conducting workshops.

- Canada – with Maya Rao (1992)
- Janapada (1993)
- Panchatantra (1994)
- Kaishiki (1995)
- USA – with Beena Badami (1997) and Puttur Narasimha Nayak (2002)
- Story of 'C' (2003–2004)
- Moby Duck Theatre company: Maze Maker (March 2004)
- Bopoluchi (November 2004)
- Toronto – with Sampradaya Dance Creations (2005)
- Fire Girl (January 2005)
- Bloodhands (August 2005)
- Tears of Fire (2006)
- Granny Vampire (August 2006)
- United Kingdom – with Chitraleka Dance Company

== Other activities ==
He is the founder of the event management organization Prakruthi, an NGO that works towards a more environmentally-friendly India by bringing people into parks. Prakruthi increases awareness about Kannada literature and the culture of Karnataka through music, and organizes musical programs all over the state.

== Recognition ==
- Aryabhatta Award – 1998, 2000, and 2010
- Swaramandara Award (Hombale Films) – 1998 and 2000
- G. V. Athri Award (Upasana) – 2000
- Silicon Jaycees Award – 2003
- Best music director award for Guptagamini, an ETV Kannada serial
- Kalāvatamsa title by Gokulam – 2010
- Colors Kannada Best Music Director for "Chitte Hejje" – 2014
- Colors Kannada Best Music Director for "Love Lavike" – 2016
- Sangeetha Ratnakara title from Shivapriya School of Dance – 2019
- Natya Sangeetha Saraswathi title from Natyasaraswathi Kuchipudi Dance Centre, Vijayawada – 2019
- Ananya Nritya Puraskar from Ananya Cultural Academy, Bangalore – 2019
- Shree Kala Jyothi title from the Bangalore Gayana Samaja – 2021
- Kala Chakravarthi title from Shivapriya School of Dance – 2022
- Karnataka Kalashri state award and title from Sangeetha Nritya Academy – 2022

== Other works ==
As a composer, Rao has created his own musical style. He has scored theatre, ballet, film and television productions. Rao scored the music to M. S. Sathyu's short film Namak Ki Kankari (1996). As an arranger, he is known for fusing Hindustani music and Carnatic music with Western techniques and arranging background scores for various films. He has worked with theatre personalities including A. S. Murthy, B. V. Karanth and B. Jayashree. Rao has been involved in theatre in various capabilities. He has also worked as an actor and director. He has acted in several soap operas including Asare, Tulasi, Manvantara and Muktha.

He was commissioned by SAMPAD, UK to compose music for Moving Earth, a dance and music production that was part of the 2012 London Olympics.

He toured as a part of Chakrafonics, a world music band that performs genres from Indian classical fusion to world music. The band toured the USA, UK and Australia from 2014 to 2015.
