= Sukanya Ramgopal =

Indian ghatam artist

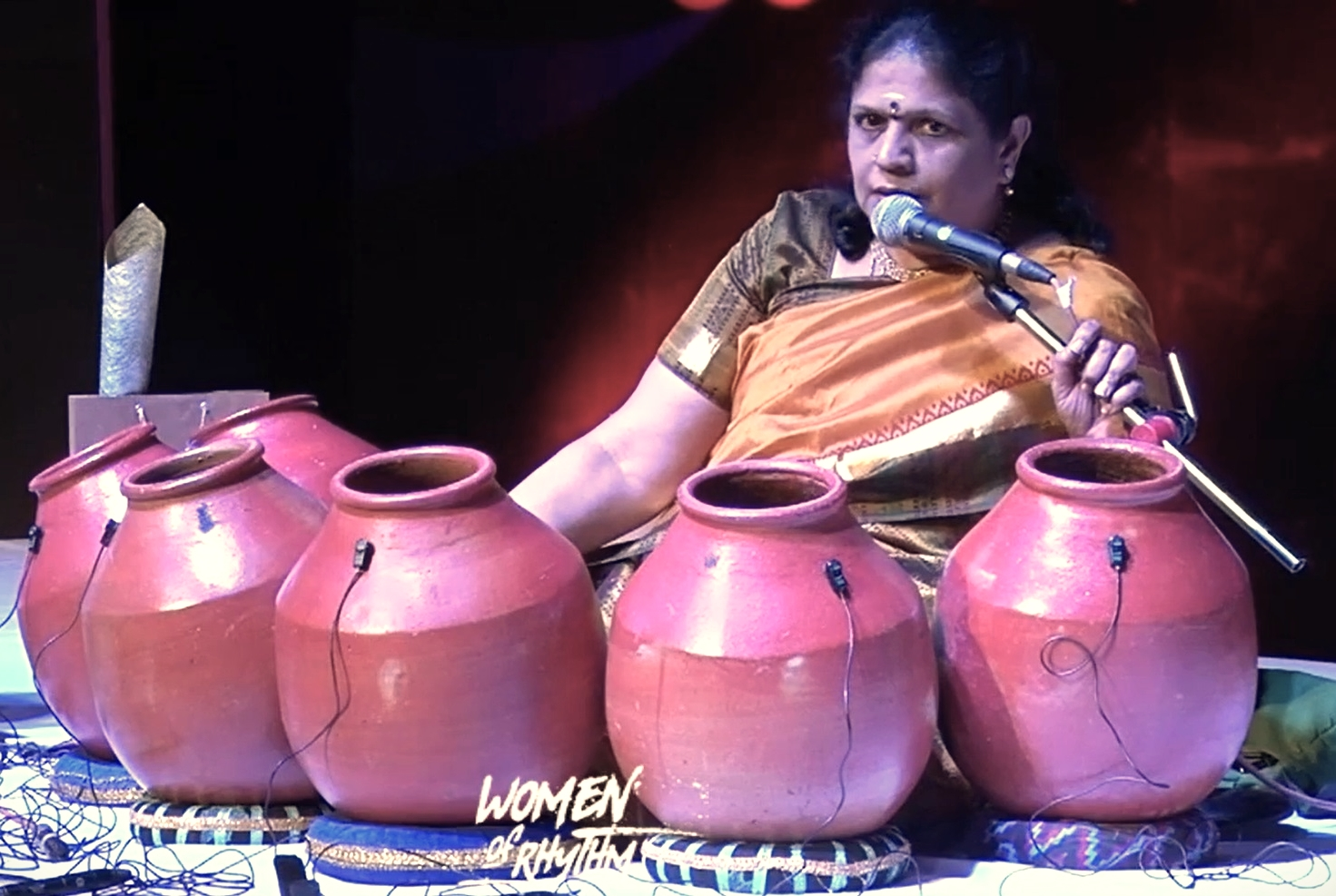
- Sukkanya preparing for a ghatam solo in 2019
- Born: 13 June 1957 (age 68); Mayiladuthurai, Tamil Nadu, India
- Occupation: percussionist
- Spouse: Ramgopal
- Parent(s): Subramaniam; Ranganayaki
- Awards: Sangeet Natak Akademi Award; Karnataka Sangeeta Nritya Academy Award
- Musical career
- Genres: Carnatic music
- Instruments: Ghatam; Mridangam; Veena

Sukanya Ramgopal is an Indian carnatic musician from Tamil Nadu. She is best known as the first woman ghatam player in Carnatic music. She is also proficient in carnatic vocal music, as well as violin, mridangam and veena. She has received several awards including Sangeet Natak Akademi Award, Karnataka Sangeeta Nritya Academy Award and awards from Madras Music Academy, Chennai.

== Biography ==
Sukanya Ramgopal was born on 13 June 1957, at Mayiladuthurai in Tamil Nadu, as the fifth child of Subramaniam and Ranganayaki. She is granddaughter of Tamil scholar U. V. Swaminatha Iyer. She studied at a Montessori school near her house and later at N K Tirumalachariar National Girls' High School. After completing a pre-university course from Ethiraj College, Chennai, Sukanya did her under-graduation BSc in mathematics from Justice Basheer Ahmed Sayeed College for Women, Chennai.

Sukanya grew up in Thyagaraja Vilasam in the old Triplicane area of Chennai. She listened to music from an early age, loving percussion then already. Sukanya and her sister Bhanumati were first sent to take Carnatic vocal lessons under Thazhakudi Ayyasaami Iyer. Later, she was sent to learn the violin at the music school Shree Jaya Ganesha Tala Vadya Vidyalaya near her home, set up by the family of the ghatam exponent Vikku Vinayakram. Her violin masters were Dhanapalan and Vikku's brother T. H. Gurumoorthy. Vinayakram's father T. H. Harihara Sharma noticed that Sukanya was more interested in mridangam class there. He secretly taught her mridangam. But soon she was attracted to the ghatam and learned ghatam from Vinayakram and his father. Her Guru Vinayakram, who at first said, 'This instrument is very difficult for a girl', seeing her dedication and prowess, agreed to teach her. She is equally talented in Konnakol (vocal percussion). She is an 'A-top' artist of All India Radio.

=== Personal life ===
Sukanya's husband Ramgopal is an engineer. After marriage, she moved to Bengaluru, Karnataka.

== Music career ==
Sukanya Ramgopal is best known as the first woman ghatam player in Carnatic music. She has performed ghatam with famous Carnatic musicians like Lalgudi Jayaraman, M. Balamuralikrishna, Palghat R. Raghu etc. She is also proficient in carnatic vocal, violin, mridangam and veena.

Ghata Tharang is a unique concept conceived by Sukanya, in 1992. In Ghata Tarang, she play 6 - 7 ghatams of different shruthis, thereby creating melody on a percussion instrument. She performed the Shankarabharanam raga with 8 ghatams and Sriranjini raga with 7 ghatams. That is the first time, a percussion instrument comes as the main part of a Carnatic concert. She leads an all-female instrumental group, the Sthree Thaal Tarang, which includes ghatam, violin, veena, morsing and mridangam. The group constantly showcases new and veteran women percussionists of the country. She also runs Sri Vikku Vinayakram School for Ghatam in Bengaluru. She founded Sunaadam Charitable Trust, for teaching and popularizing the ghatam.

Sukanya wrote a book on ghatam titled Sunaadam, The Vikku Bani of Ghatam Playing. She was also featured in the book The Singer and the Song: Conversation with Women Musicians by C. S. Lakshmi, published by Kali for Woman in 2000.

== Awards and honors ==
- Sangeet Natak Akademi Award 2014
- Karnataka Sangeeta Nritya Academy Award, 1982
- Ananya Puraskara 2015 by Ananya Cultural Academy, Bangalore
- DEVI award 2015 from Indian Express
- Best Senior Ghatam Artist Award from Madras Music Academy, 2007
- T. T. K. Award 2017 from Madras Music Academy
- Award from Narada Gaana Sabha, Chennai, 1990
- Raaga Tharangini Award from Dr.Semmangudi Srinivasaier, 2000
- Putaachaar Award from Percussive Arts Centre Bangalore, 2001
- Best Artist of the Year Award from Bangalore Gayana Samaja, 2009
- She was felicitated by the Ayyanar College of Music, Bangalore, 2008

=== Titles received ===
Sukanya has also received several titles like Vani Kala Nipuna (meaning:Speech and art expert) by Sri Tyaga Brahma Gana Sabha, Laya Kala Nidhi (meaning:treasure in rhythm and art) by Bhandup Fine Arts Society, Mumbai, Layakala Prathibhamani (meaning:rhythmic art genius) by Percussive Arts Centre, Bangalore, Naada Laya Samragni (meaning:queen of tone and rhythm) from Sree Ramakrishna Bhajana Sabha, Bangalore and Laya Vadya Chathura (meaning:Rhythmic musical elegance) from Anna Nagar Music Circle Trust and Sadguru Sangeetha Vidyalaya.
