= Santosh Ghante =

Harmonium player

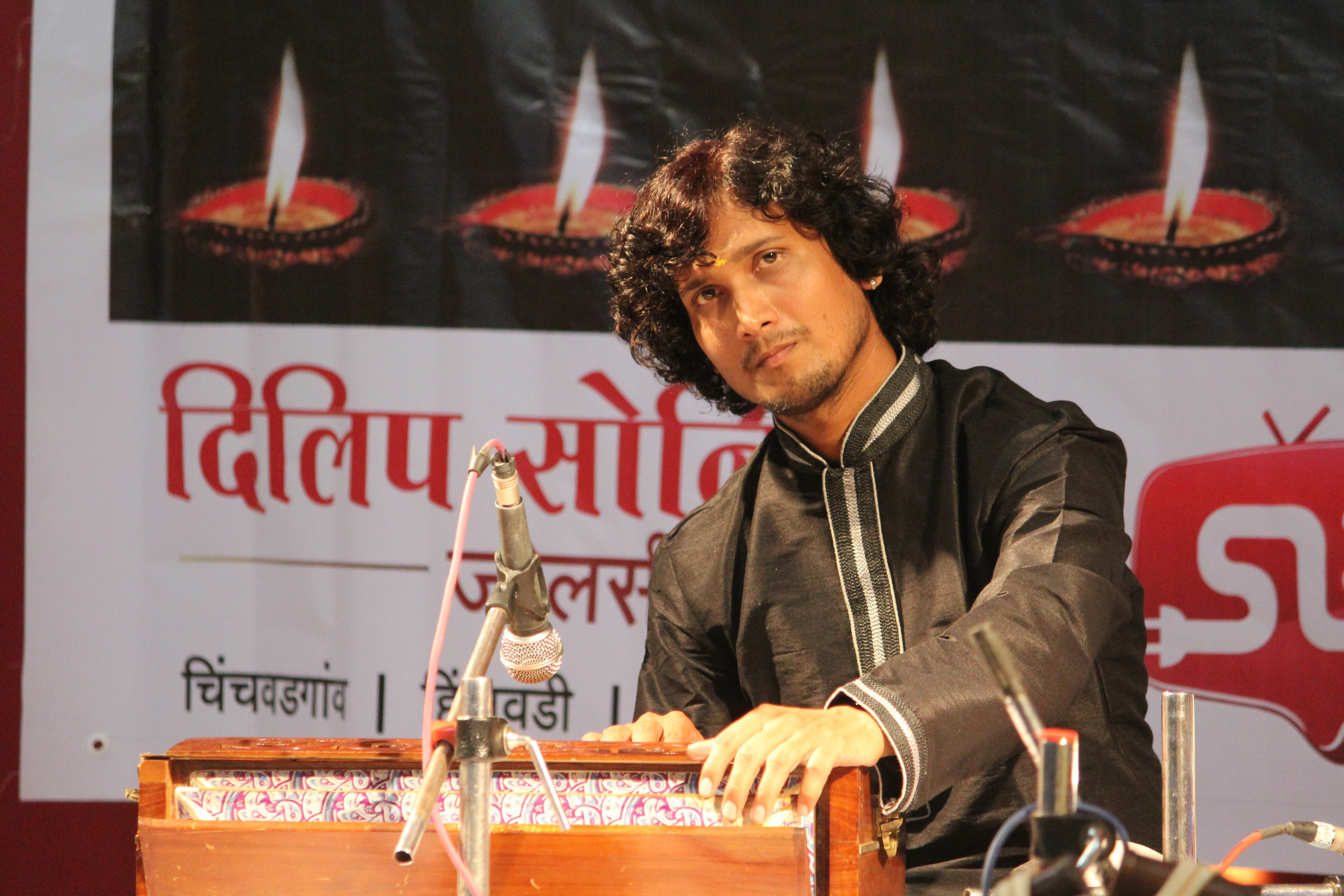
- Santosh Ghante

Background information
- Born: 11 August 1983; Latur, India
- Origin: India
- Genres: Indian classical Hindustani Classical Music
- Occupations: Harmonium player, Composer
- Instrument: Harmonium
- Years active: 1999
- Website: www.santoshghante.com

Santosh Ghante (11 August 1983) is an Indian harmonium player, soloist, accompanist and composer.

== Early life ==
Santosh Ghante was born to lower middle class family in Chinchwad.

== Career ==
He is the disciple of Late Pt. Appa Jalgaonkar. He did a series of workshops with school children during 10 to 30 September 2006, He was able to cover 50 schools from Latur district, these were introductory workshops around classical music. He has performed solo in 22 countries. He has taken harmonium from accompanied instrument to solo, with different experiments with it. He has been trying to popularise folk music and providing platform for the neglected forms of music too. He has been actively promoting the harmonium in India and abroad, and for his work he was facilitated by various organizations and institutions. He edited a book to pay tribute to his Guru Appasaheb Jalgonkar, named Sursakha, which was published in 2011.

== Samvadini Kala Manch ==
He has established an organization for the popularize harmonium, with this organization, they organized events, provide training of harmonium to kids from dis-privilege background.
