= Appa Jalgaonkar =

Indian harmonium player (1922–2009)

- Born: Sakharam Prabhakar Jalgaonkar; 1 January 1922; Jalna district, Bombay Presidency, British India
- Died: 16 September 2009 (aged 87); Pune, Maharashtra, India
- Other name: Appasaheb Jalgaonkar
- Occupation: Harmonium player
- Awards: Sangeet Natak Akademi Award

Sakharam Prabhakar Jalgaonkar (1 January 1922 – 16 September 2009), known as Appa Jalgaonkar or Appasaheb Jalgaonkar, was an Indian harmonium player from the state of Maharashtra. Born in 1922 and adopted when he was two years old, he started to learn singing but had to stop due to voice change with the onset of puberty and later shifted to learning harmonium. He accompanied several Hindustani classical singers, tabla artistes and dancers in their performances. He received Sangeet Natak Akademi Award in Harmonium category – a category in which the Sangeet Natak Akademi felicitates rarely. Following a paralysis attack in late 1990s, he died in 2009.

== Early life and education ==
Born in an agricultural family in Jalgaon village in present-day Jalna district, Maharashtra (then in Bombay Presidency in British India), Jalgaonkar was adopted when he was two years old. He did his primary schooling until fifth-standard in Jalna. Secondary schooling was imparted in Urdu in Jalna at that time, which his adopted father disapproved of, so he discontinued Jalgaonkar's education.

Following his exit from formal education, Jalgaonkar forayed into arts upon his adoptive father's insistence. He began taking lessons in singing in Dhrupad-Dhamar styles from classical vocalist Balkrushnabuva Chikhalikar. Upon attaining puberty, his voice started breaking thus ending his possibility of becoming a vocalist. He later continued to focus on learning to play harmonium and specialised in it.

== Career ==
In 1947, Jalgaonkar moved to Pune. He was introduced to singer Manik Varma by Joshi. Apart from Varma, he accompanied several prominent Hindustani classical singers some of whom include Aamir Khan, Bade Ghulam Ali Khan, Bhimsen Joshi, Gangubai Hangal, Hirabai Barodekar, Jasraj, Kishori Amonkar, Kumar Gandharva, Mukul Shivputra, Roshan Ara Begum, and Vasantrao Deshpande. Tabla artistes whom he accompanied include Ahmed Jan Thirakwa, Alla Rakha, Kishan Maharaj, Ravindra Yavagal, Samta Prasad, and Zakir Hussain. Among dancers, he accompanied Birju Maharaj and Rohini Bhate. In 1970s, he started giving solo performances. He is regarded as a pioneer in bringing upon high respect for the art of harmonium play. He also taught harmonium. Santosh Ghante was one of his disciples.

== Reception ==
Jalgaonkar's command over laya (tempo) and tala (rhythmic clapping or tapping one's hand on one's arm to measure musical time) was often praised by his peers during mehfils (venues for recreational activities including singing and dancing). Shrikant Deshpande, a Hindustani music vocalist of Kirana gharana, noted, "[Jalgaonkar] was not just an accomplished accompanist but also well-versed with various facets of music. He knew in detail about each and every raga. Also he was equally well-versed as an accompanist across different genres of musicbe (sic) it classical, thumris or even ghazals". Sitar artiste Ravi Shankar said "[Jalgaonkar] gives the most melodious and graceful harmonium recitals. There is no equal to his grace and clarity".

=== Awards ===
Jalgaonkar was conferred with Sangeet Natak Akademi Award, India's highest civilian award in the field of arts, in 2000 by the Sangeet Natak Akademi overseen by the Government of India in Harmonium category – a category in which the artistes were awarded rarely by the Akademi.

== Death and legacy ==
Jalgaonkar's health started deteriorating following paralysis in mid-to-late 1990s. Around the same time, his wife, Leela, died. On 16 September 2009, he died in Pune.

In memory of Jalgaonkar, Ganvardhan, a community that promotes Indian classical music and dance, set up an award "Appasaheb Jalgaonkar Smruti Samvadini Wadan Puraskar" and doles out ₹5,000 (US$52) in cash and an honorary citation to artists.
