= Swarabat =

Indian plucked string instrument

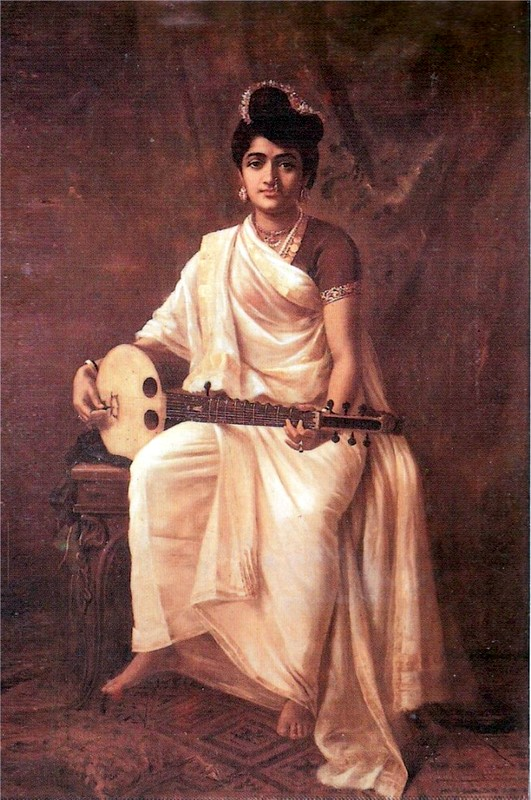
'Lady playing swarabat'. Painting by Raja Ravi Varma.

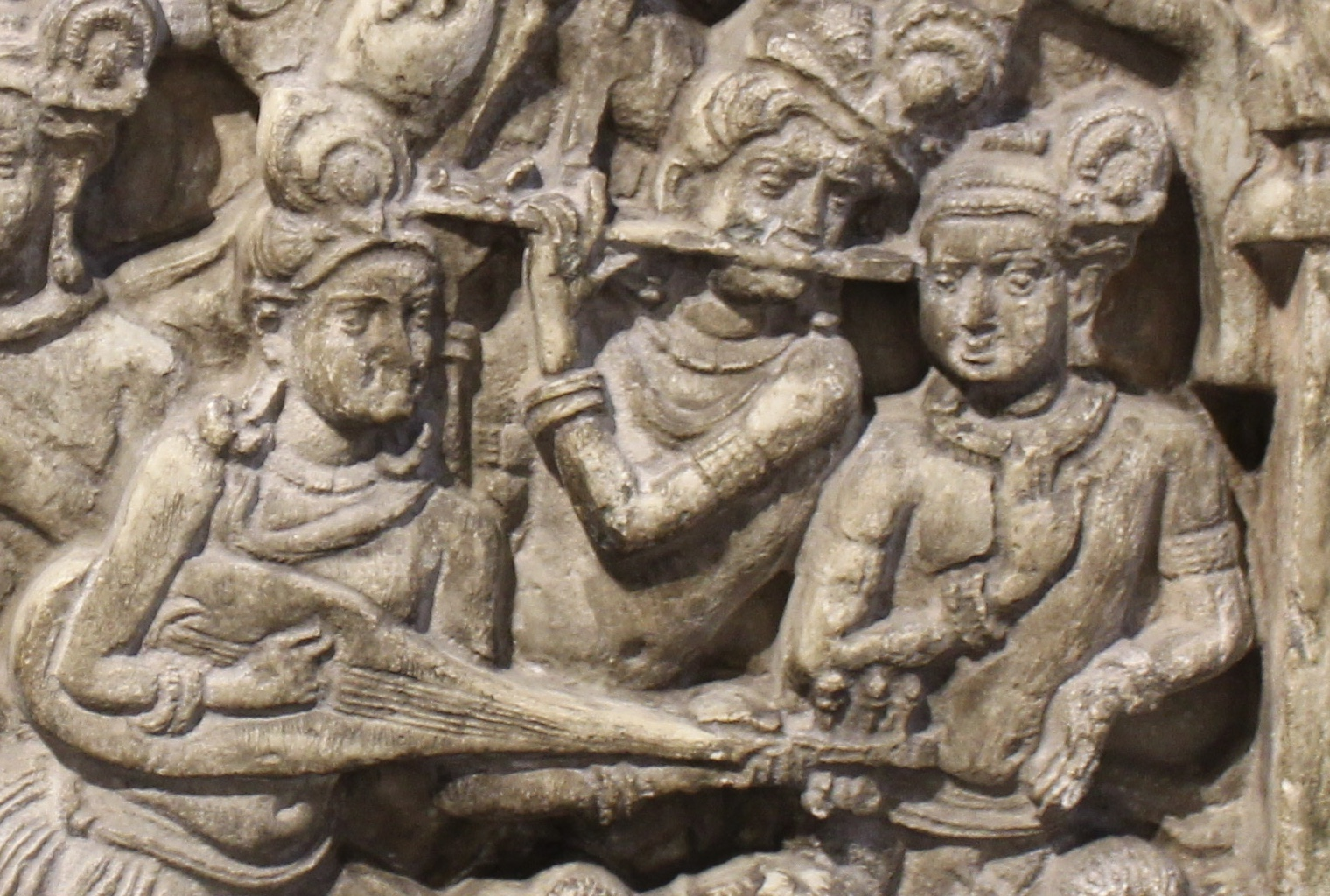
Instrument similar to swarabat in relief at Amaravati Stupa in southern India, 2nd century CE.

The Swarabat, Swarbat or Swaragat is a rare plucked string instrument of the classical Carnatic music genre of South India. It belongs to the chordophone, lute family of musical instruments, and is closely related to the veena and yazh instruments of the ancient South Asian orchestral ensemble.

== Etymology ==
Although popularly known as Swarabat, its correct pronunciation is Swaragat. Swara from Sanskrit connotes a note in the successive steps of the octave, ghat refers to steps leading down towards a river, while bhat in the language means scholar.

== Construction ==
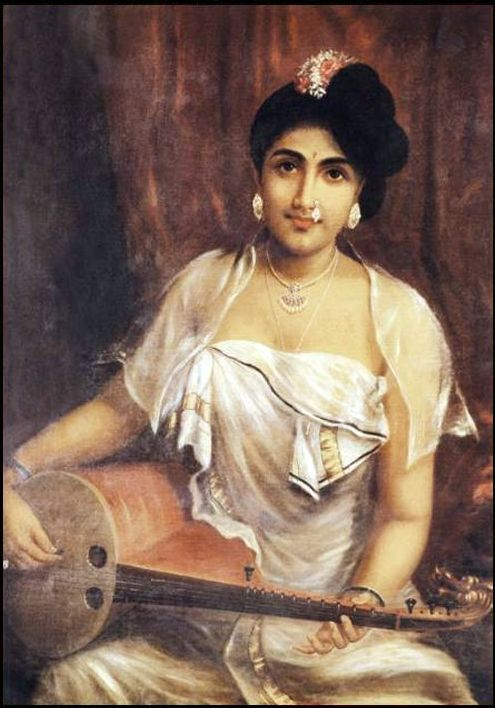
The painter Raja Ravi Varma featured the instrument in many of his works.

Like its Carnatic cousin, the veena, it has frets, a feature that also distinguishes it from their ancestor, the Yazh harp (ancient veena). Part of the chordophonic lute family of instruments, the Swarabat body is made of wood on which a skin is stretched. On top of this skin, a bridge is placed upon which silk strings pass, which are plucked with a plectrum carved out of horn. There is a resonator and a stem, both made of wood. The resonator is covered with animal hide. The frets were made from animal gut (usually a goat). The head resembles a parrot or peacock. The tuning pegs are fixed to the neck.

== Sound ==
Although the Swarabat features a unique construction, the range of sound delivered by it is relatively limited. It produces a timbre similar to a bass rubab and bass guitar.

== Use and history ==
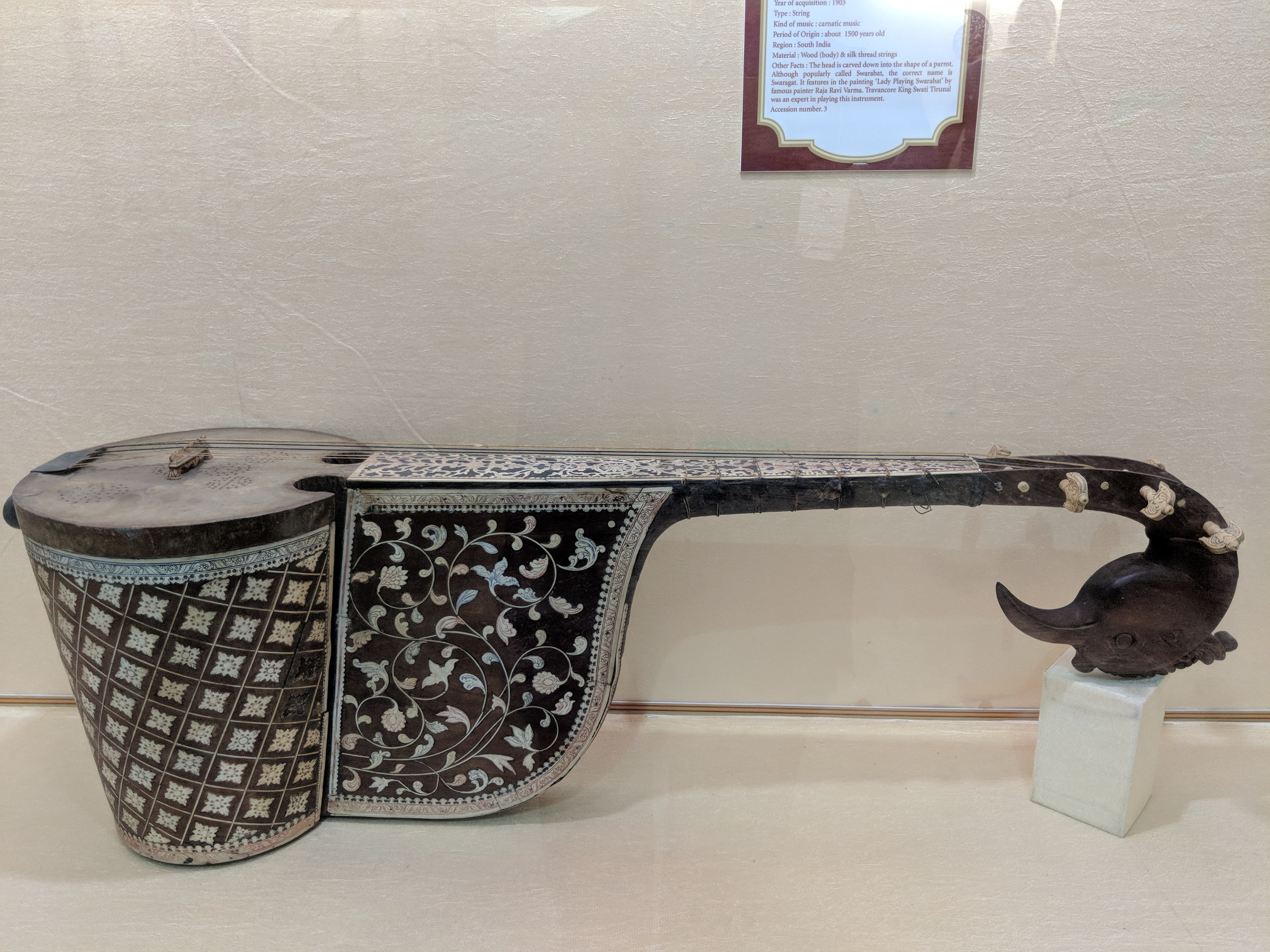
Swarabat or swaragat, 1903, carved with parrot's head

The Swarabat is today a very rare string instrument used in Carnatic music, that once featured prominently as an original staple in the Katcheri and Harikatha stage ensembles of royal carpet composers. Musicians in the royal courts of Mysore, Travancore, Thanjavur kingdom and the Thondaman dynasty of Pudukottai favoured its unique bass tone accompaniment; students of the Saraswati veena were often proficient in playing the Swarabat.

Old manuscripts, photographs and Swarabat instruments themselves have been preserved at museums worldwide. Prolific musicians who have played it have been Palghat Parameswara Bhagavathar, Baluswami Dikshitar, the Raja Swathi Thirunal Rama Varma, Veene Sheshanna, and Krishna Iyengar.

== See also ==
- Sursingar
- Surbahar
- Sarod
- Veena

== References and citations ==
- Media related to Swarabat at Wikimedia Commons
- Padma Bhushan Prof. P. Sambamurthy (2005). "History of Indian Music". The Indian Music Publishing House, 208-214.
- Photo of Met museum
- India9.com
