= Veena Venkatagiriyappa =

Veena Venkatagiriyappa (1887–1951) was a celebrated musician from Heggadadevanakote in the Kingdom of Mysore (in present-day Karnataka, India).

Venkatagiriyappa was born into a family of ascetics on 26 April 1887. His father, Venkataramaiah, died while he was still an infant. His initial musical training was under his maternal grandfather, Dodda Subbarao, and maternal uncle, Chikka Subbarao. He later studied under Veene Sheshanna, by whom he was greatly influenced. He was also exposed to Western classical music by the director of the orchestra maintained by the Maharaja of Mysore. He later compiled a collection of Carnatic classical compositions rendered using Western musical notation.

An asthana vidwan at the court of Maharaja Krishnaraja Wadiyar IV, Venkatagiriyappa composed many Carnatic classical songs in the Western style. His famous compositions include Sharadhe Shubrahare (Raga Sharadapriya) and Nagma (Ragas Hindola, Keeravani, Behag). He served as the director of the palace band, and taught veena to the daughters of Yuvaraja Kanteerava Narasimharaja Wadiyar. He also taught music at the Graduate Training College (now the Government College of Teacher Education) and Maharani's High School in Mysore.

Venkatagiriyappa's grandson Vidwan Srinivasa Prasanna is a noted veena player.
