= Karnataka Kalashri =

Karnataka Kalashri Award is a State Akademi Award of the Karnataka state government's Karnataka Sangeeta Nritya Academy and Department of Kannada and Culture. Karnataka is a state in southwest India. Each year the Academy Awards for excellence in music, art, dance and literature are awarded at the Karnataka Sangeeta Nritya Academy. The award carries citation, trophy, shawl.

The Honorary Awards carry a cash prize of Rs.50,000 and Annual Awards carry a cash prize of Rs.25,000 and the awards will be conferred on eminent artists for their selfless service and contribution, award given by chief minister, cultural minister director of Kannada and culture and eminent artist

Awardees 2019

- Pandit Dr. S. Ballesh " Karnataka Kalashri " Karnataka State Government Award for his contribution to Indian classical music by Karnataka Sangeeta Nritya Academy - 2019
