= Karnataka Sangeeta Nritya Academy =

Karnataka Sangeeta Nritya Academy is a performing arts organization in Bengaluru, India that is sponsored by the Department of Kannada and Culture in the Karnataka government. It was previously known as Karnataka Sangeetha Nataka Akademi.

The academy promotes dance, drama and music within the culture of Karnataka. It was opened on 26 April 1958, inaugurated by Indian Prime Minister Pandit Jawaharlal Nehru.

The academy collaborates with the Sangeet Natak Academy in New Delhi.

== Activities ==
The Ravindra Kalashetra theatre in Bengaluru city is the academy's performance venue. The academy confers the Karnataka Kalashri Award.

The Academy give awards every year for excellence in performance of music, art, dance and literature. The award carries a citation, trophy, and a shawl. The honorary awards carry a cash prize of Rs. 50,000 and Annual Awards carry a cash prize of Rs.25,000.
