= Gayatri (disambiguation) =

Gayatri (or Gayathri, Gaayathri, Gayathrie) (Sanskrit: गायत्री, gāyatrī) is the feminine form of gāyatra, a Sanskrit word for a song or a hymn. It may also refer to:

- The name of a Vedic poetic meter of 24 syllables (three lines of eight syllables each)
- in particular, the Hindu Gayatri Mantra
- Hindu goddess Gayatri, as a personification of that mantra

== Media ==
=== Films ===
- Gayathri (1977 film), 1977 Indian Tamil--language film
- Gayatri (2018 film), 2018 Indian Telugu-language film
- Gayatri Mahima, 1977 Indian film
- Gayathri (1973 film), a 1973 Indian film
- Gayathri (TV series), Indian Tamil-language soap opera
- Gayathri Maduve, 1983 Indian Kannada-language film
- Ilayaval Gayathri, 2018 Indian Malayalam-language television series
- Soorya Gayathri, 1992 Indian Malayalam-language drama film

=== Others ===
- Gayathri Films, Indian film production and distribution company

- Gayatri (Spider-Man:Across the Spider-Verse)

== People ==
=== Entertainers ===
- Gayatri, (born 1960), Indian actress
- Gayatri Patel Bahl, American-born Indian actress
- Gayatri Rema, Indian actress
- Gayatri Arun, Indian actress
- Gayatri Joshi (born 1977), model turned Bollywood actress
- Gayatri Jayaraman (born 1984), Indian actress in South Indian cinema
- Gayathri, Indian actress
- Gayathri Ashokan (born 1957), Indian film screenwriter
- Gayathri Dias, Sri Lankan actress
- Gayathri Mudigonda (born 1983), Indian–Swedish actress
- Gayathri Raguram (born 1983), Indian film actress
- Gayathri Reddy, Indian model and actress
- Gayathri Suresh (born 1992), Indian actress in Tamil cinema
- Gayathrie, Indian actress im Tamil cinema
- Pushkar–Gayathri Indian husband-and-wife filmmaker duo

=== Music ===
- Gayatri Asokan (born 1978), Indian playback singer, working primarily in Malayalam
- Gayatri Iyer (born 1985), Indian playback singer, working primarily in Bollywood
- Gayatri Sankaran, Indian Carnatic musician
- Gayathri Girish (born 1970s), Carnatic singer
- Gayathri Govind, Indian classical dancer
- Gayathri Khemadasa (born 1976), Sri Lankan composer and contemporary classical pianist
- Gayathri Venkataraghavan, Carnatic singer
- E. Gayathri (born 1959) Indian Carnatic musician
- Ranjani–Gayatri, Indian Carnatic vocal and violin duo
- Siti Gayatri, member of JKT48

=== Sports ===
- Gayatri Gole (born 1998), English cricketer
- Gayatri Pawaskar (born 1999), youngest rifle shooter in India
- Gayatri Reddy (born 1986), owner of team Deccan Chargers in the Indian Premier League
- Gayathri Kariyawasam (born 1976), former Sri Lankan woman cricketer

=== Others ===
- Gayatri Chakravorty Spivak (born 1942), Indian literary theorist, philosopher
- Gayatri Devi (1919–2009), third princess of Jaipur, a politician
- Gayatri Devi (INC politician), an Indian politician from Madhya Pradesh
- Gayatri Devi (BJP politician)
- Gayatri Gopinath, associate professor at New York University
- Gayatri Prasad Prajapati, Indian politician
- Gayatri Rajapatni, 13th century queen consort of Majapahit empire
- Gayatri Raje Pawar, Indian politician
- Gayatri Reddy, Indian anthropologist
- Gayatri Saraf (born 1952), Indian writer
- Gayatri Shah, Nepalese politician
- Gayatri Shunmugam (born 1986), Singaporean model and beauty queen
- Gayatri Sinha, Indian art critic and curator
- Gayathri Govindaraj (born 1991), Indian athlete
- Gayathri Prabhu (born 1974), Indian novelist
- Kalaivani Rajaratnam or Gayatri, the Sri Lankan assassin of Indian prime minister Rajiv Gandhi

== Others ==
- Gayatri Gyan Mandir, Mahuda, Hindu temple in India
- Gayatri River having a source at Mahabaleshwar, Maharashtra, India
- Gayatri Vidya Parishad College of Engineering, Indian education institute
- Gayatri Vihar, Indian colony in Uttarakhand
- Gayatri Waterfalls, in Telangana, India
- Gayathripuzha River, a river in Kerala, India
- Maharani Gayatri Devi Girls' Public School, Indian school
- Ved Mata Gaytri Mandir, Indian temple
