= Gayathri Govind =

Kerala dancer

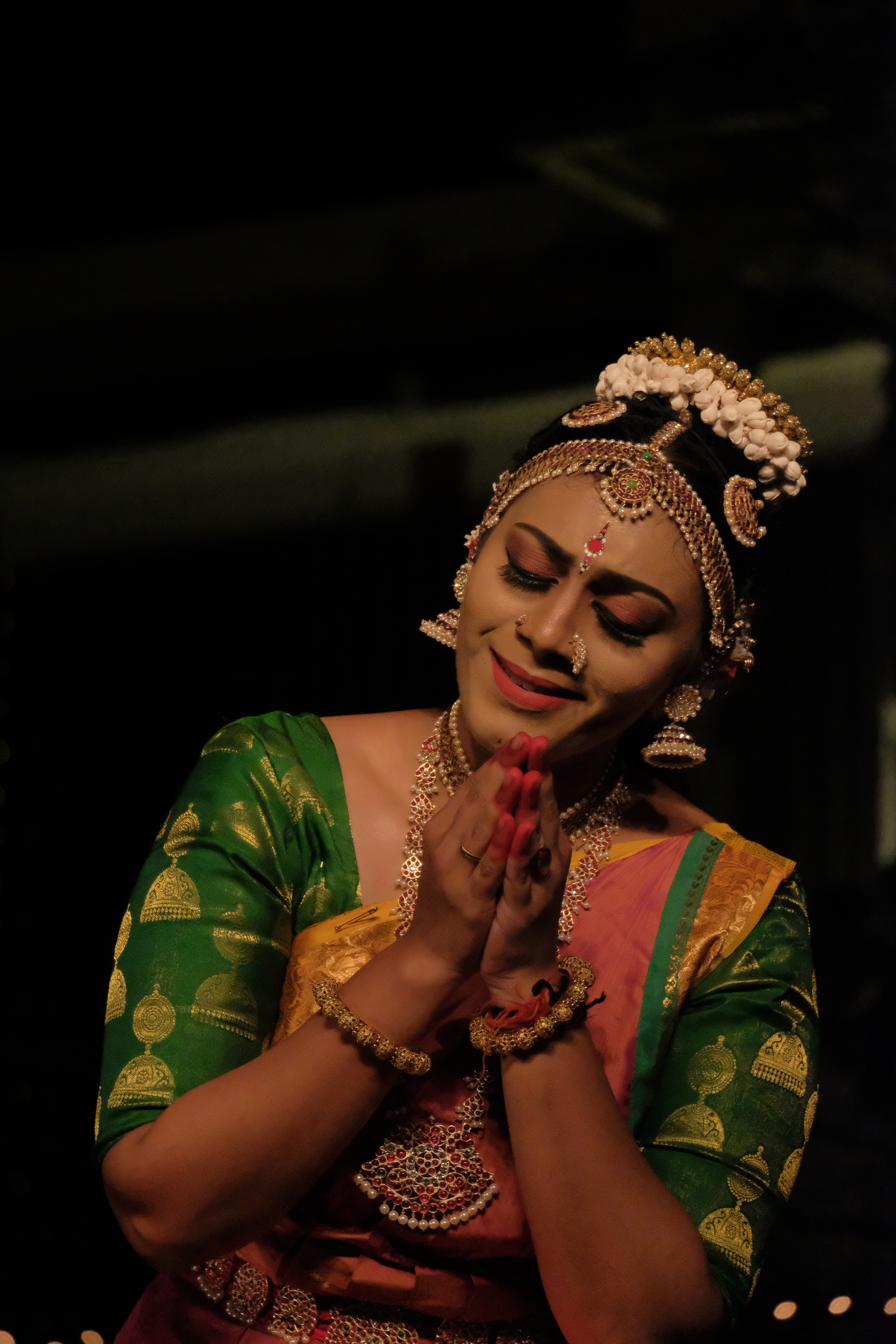
- Born: Gayathri Govind; Trivandrum, Kerala, India
- Occupations: Dancer, Choreographer, Anchor, Software Professional, Entrepreneur
- Years active: 1992–present

Gayathri Govind, is an Indian classical dancer, choreographer, actor,the winner of Kerala State Television Award in 2024 (Special Jury Award in Acting) and the winner of Asianet's Vodafone Thakadimi in 2008.

She is trained in Bharatanatyam, Mohiniyattam, Kuchipudi, Ottanmthullal, Kathakali, Kathak and Keralanadanam. She has been performing on various stages in India and abroad from the age of four. She is also a well known Choreographer and owns her own dance troupe ''Silver Streak" in Trivandrum. She anchored many TV programs and live shows on Kairali TV, Asianet, Surya TV, Mazhavil Manorama, Kairali We, Asianet News, BTV, Doordarsan, ACV. She is the model of the famous Tea Brand Society Tea. She was working as a Software Engineer in HCL Technologies, Chennai and now resides in Trivandrum. She runs a dance school, Takadhimi in Chennai and Trivandrum.

On 16 October 2015 she won the Golden Women Award 2015 for the category Entertainment, Media and Comm at Helsinki, Finland.

She has performed Mohiniyattom and Kuchipudi recitals for the prestigious Soorya Festival in the years 2012 and 2013.Gayathri was also a part of the Soorya Production 'Gaandharam'.

Gayathri's dance productions are 'Bhavasamhitha' (a collaboration of dance, music, light and sound), 'Aadiparasakthi' (a multimedia dance production ) Rama Ramethi (A walk with Rama) and Gourishankaram (a multimedia dance production ). Gayathri Won Best Director (Female) Award in SATYAJIT RAY GOLDEN ARC FILM AWARD 2022 for the short film SILU.

== Website ==
- www.gayathrigovind.com

== Education ==
Gayathri did her schooling in Holy Angel's Convent, Trivandrum and graduated in Bachelor of technology from Mar Baselios College, Trivandrum. She completed the course ''Healing with the Arts'' from University of Florida. Gayathri completed her Masters in Dance and is a diploma holder in Digital Media Production .

== Awards ==
- Won Kerala State Television Award in 2024 , Special Jury Mention for Acting.
- Won Best Director (Female) Award in SATYAJIT RAY GOLDEN ARC FILM AWARD 2022 for the short film SILU*
- Won South Indian Cinema Television Academy Special Jury Award Best Actress in the short film SILU
- Won Golden Women Award 2015 for category Entertainment, Media and Comm.
- Winner of Asianet's Vodafone Thakadimi in 2008.
- Won 1st Prize in DHOOM Pro in 2007.
- Won many laurels in State and University level youth festivals.
- Won Best Director (Female) Award in SATYAJIT RAY GOLDEN ARC FILM AWARD 2023 for the short film Ninneyum Kaathu
- Won Best Actress Award in South Indian Cinema Television Academy Awards 2024 for the short film Ninneyum Kaathu

== Filmography ==
=== Commercials ===
Title	Language	Director	Cinematographer
Society Tea	Hindi, English	Vittorio Badini Confalonieri	Karthik Vijay
Aashirvaad	Telugu	Hari Prasad Uday (Kadhai Films)	Balaji Subramanyam
Pankajakasthuri Herbals	Kannada	Reji Syne	Tanu Balak
Domex	Tamil, Malayalam, Punjabi, English, Kannada, Hindi, Telugu	Vijay Veermal	Ravi Varman
Sri Gokulam Public School	Malayalam	Kavitha Jayasree	Mahesh Raj
National Program for Climate Change and Human Health	Malayalam	Prakash Prabhakar C P	Satish
Lever Ayush Toothpaste	Tamil	Amit R Sharma	Tushar Kantiray
Bipha Ayurveda	Malayalam	Gowri Nair	Gowri Nair
PVM Hair Oil	Malayalam	Sathya	

=== Movies ===
Title	Director	Cinematographer	Language
Djinn	Sidharth Bharathan	Girish Gangadharan	Malayalam
Kho Kho	Rahul Riji Nair	Tobin Thomas	Malayalam
Anthakshari	Vipin Das	Bablu Aju	Malayalam
The Family Act	Shaalin Zoya	Sarath Kumar	Malayalam
Nila Varum Velai	Hariharan	Mukesh	Tamil

=== Web series ===
Title	Director
Angane Angane Anu	Gayathri Govind

=== Short films ===
Title	Director	Cinematographer
Shwethavani	Nidhin C	Nithin Sekhar, Neeraj
SILU	Gayathri Govind	Sidharth Jayapalan
Ninneyum Kaathu	Gayathri Govind	Yedukrishnan
Khadima	Govind K Saji	Akhil P S
Baby	Ananthan G T	

=== Documentary ===
Title	Director	Cinematographer
Njanum	Arun Kishore	James Chris

=== Dubbing ===
Title	Language	Director
Chithha	Malayalam	Arun Kumar
3BHK	Malayalam	Sri Ganesh
Domex	Tamil	Vijay Veermal
