= Gayatri Gyan Mandir, Mahuda =

Gayatri Gyan Mandir
- Location within Jharkhand

Religion
- Affiliation: Hinduism
- District: Dhanbad
- Deity: Gayatri, Shiva Hanuman Durga Saraswati Lakshmi
- Festival: Maha Shivaratri Gavatri Jayanti Navratri Guru Purnima
- Governing body: Ved Mata Gayatri Pariwar Trust Santikunj Haridwar, Gayatri Pariwar Rachnatmak Trust

Location
- Location: Washery Colony Mahuda
- State: Jharkhand
- Country: India
- Interactive map of Gayatri Gyan Mandir
- Coordinates: 23.748671°N 86.263890°E

Architecture
- Type: Mandir
- Creator: Yuva Mandal, Mahuda, Baghmara
- Completed: 2 April 2004

Specifications
- Temple: 3
- Monument: 1
- Inscriptions: Yag Shala
- Elevation: 210 m (689 ft)

Website
- www.awgp.org

Gayatri Gyan Mandir is a Hindu temple located at Washery Colony, near Mahuda Junction railway station, Mahuda, Dhanbad, Jharkhand, India. Here the goddess Gayatri is worshipped. It is a temple located in Baghmara census town in Dhanbad. The temple campus is located near Mahuda Bazaar. Mahadeo Mandir is also nearest to it.
