= J. Hareendran Nair =

Indian doctor

- Born: Kattakkada, Thiruvananthapuram, Kerala, India
- Occupations: Ayurveda practitioner; Entrepreneur
- Spouse: Asha
- Children: 2
- Parents: K. C. Janardhanan Nair; Pankajam
- Awards: Padma Shri
- Website: Official web site of Pankajakasturi

J. Hareendran Nair is an Indian Ayurveda practitioner and entrepreneur from Kerala. He is the founder of Pankajakasthuri Herbals, This is a business group that contributed to the promotion and popularising of Ayurveda and ayurvedic products across the country. In 2012, the Government of India, honored him with Padma Shri for his services to the cause of Ayurveda.

== Biography ==
Hareendran Nair was born in Kattakkada, Thiruvananthapuram, in Kerala to Janardhanan Nair, who was a document writer and Pankajam. He was the youngest of their three children. After an early education at the Government Upper Primary School, Kandala and the Christian College, Kattakada, he joined the Government Ayurveda College, Thiruvananthapuram. He graduated in ayurvedic medicine with a BAMS in 1983.

His medical career started as a research fellow at Poojappura Regional Research Institute. He submitted his resignation from the service when he was transferred to the central Kerala town of Shornur in 1986. Nair spent the next two years in the formation of Sree Dhanwanthari Ayurvedics, the forerunner of Pankajakasthuri Herbals India Ltd [PHIL], which came into stream in 1988 at Poovachal. The early days were difficult, however this changed in 1996 when Nair launched ayurvedic over-the-counter products under the brand name Pankajakasthuri, a name coined combining his mother's name, Pankajam, and his eldest daughter's name, Kasturi.

Hareendran Nair is married to Asha who is involved in the business at administrative levels. The couple has two daughters, both studying ayurvedic medicine. The family lives in Thiruvananthapuram.

== Pankajakasthuri ==
Hareendran Nair found Pankajakasthuri in 1988, under the name Sree Dhanwanthari Ayurvedics at Poovachal, in Thiruvananthapuram. In 1996, the brand Pankajakasthuri was launched and the company's name was changed to Pankajakasthuri Herbals Pvt Ltd. Over the years, the establishment has grown to cover the parent company dealing in over-the-counter ayurvedic products, Pankajakasthuri Panchakarama spas, Pankajakasthuri Jeevanam clinics and Pankajakasthuri Ayurveda Hospital, Herbal garden and Pankajakasthuri Ayurveda Medical College, in Killi near Kattakkada, which opened on 28 August 2002, which is stated to be the first self-financed ayurveda medical college in Kerala.

== Social service ==
Hareendran Nair is also active in social service. He has arranged for 1000 free lunches everyday through his Ayurveda medical college. He also sponsors the educational expenses of 125 students, and provides free in-patient medical treatment to 50 patients, including medicines. His group also conducts free medical camps every month in Thiruvananthapuram. "My only agenda," said Nair, "is the popularization of Ayurveda as an effective and economic mode of treatment among people."

== Positions ==
Nair holds various positions at regional and national levels.

- Managing Director, Pankajakasthuri Herbals India Pvt. Ltd
- Managing Director, Pankajakasthuri Ayurveda Medical College
- Managing Director, Pankajakasthuri Engineering College
- Chief Executive Pankajakasthuri Panchakarma Centres
- Founder and Secretary of Pankajakasthuri Herbal Research Foundation
- Advisor on Ayurveda to the Government of Nagaland
- Member of the Regional Advisory Committee for the Organized and service tax sector in the central Excise & Customs, Thiruvananthapuram
- Member of the Medicinal Plant Board, Kerala State
- Founder Director of the Care Keralam, a cluster company in the Ayurveda sector meant to promote Kerala brand ayurvedic products
- Patron of Chinmaya Mission, Thiruvananthapuram
- Administrative Director, Neyyar Medicity, Neyyar Healthcare Pvt Ltd

== Awards and recognitions ==
- Padma Shri – 2012
- Management Leadership Award – Trivandrum Management Association
- Sai Maa Award(international) for Ayurvedic Propagation
- Best Entrepreneur Award, Industries Department – Government of Kerala
- Yuvaprathibha Award – Ayurvedic Medical Officers Association
- Ayurvedaratna Award
- Entrepreneur of the Year Award – Berchmans Institute of Management Studies
