= Gayatri Pawaskar =

Indian sport shooter

Gayatri Pawaskar (born 4 September 1999) is the youngest rifle shooter in the list of top 30 in India. Pawaskar he received a gold medal for the Women's Youth Team 10-metre air rifle at the 13th Asian Shooting Championship.

She hails from Dadar, Mumbai.

== Awards and recognition ==
- 2015 : Gold medal for 10-metre air rifle women's Youth Team at 13th Asian shooting championship with Prachi Gadkari and Aashi Rastogi.
- 2015 : Silver medal in the Air Rifle Peep Sight Girl's U-19, 2015
- 2015 : Bronze medal in the 8th Youth Asian Airgun Championship
- 2014 : 5th rank in 7th Youth Asian championship in air rifle, Kuwait
- 2013 : 9th rank in 10M rifle youth women (ISSF) national championship (Team India)
