= Domestos =

Bleach-based household cleaning product brand

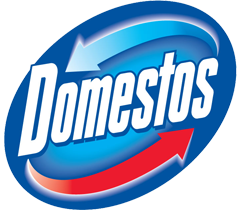
- Product type: Household Cleaning
- Current owner: Unilever
- Country: United Kingdom
- Introduced: 1929; 97 years ago
- Related brands: Domex (India, the Philippines, and Sri Lanka); Glorix (Netherlands); Promax (Thailand); Vim (Brazil, Argentina and Vietnam); Domesto (Japan)
- Markets: Worldwide

Domestos is a British brand of household cleaning range which contains bleach (primarily sodium hypochlorite, NaOCl). It is manufactured by Unilever. Domestos (and Chlorox, essentially a 10–25% solution of sodium hypochlorite) contains 100,000 ppm (10%) of the active component, available chlorine; many other bleaches contain 50,000 or less.

== History ==
Domestos was first produced in 1929 by Wilfred Handley, an industrial chemist, and sold door-to-door by salesmen in Newcastle upon Tyne who refilled stoneware jars bought by the customers. In 1961 the company was acquired by Lever Brothers.

== Product range ==
- Thick Bleach – "with a variety of fragrances" – rebranded as "Domestos 24HR", with a reformulation to give "24hr protection from flying germs." – rebranded again as "Domestos Extended Germ-Kill". Still branded Thick Bleach in Australia.
- Domestos 5x – "a bleach which lasts 5x longer than any other bleach or toilet cleaner" – Discontinued
- Sink and Pipe Unblocker
- Domestos Blocks – Discontinued
- Domestos Hygienic Wipes – Discontinued
- Domestos Bleach Cleaning Spray
- Domestos Zero Limescale – "an extra thick hydrochloric acid toilet cleaner can even killing germs even below the waterline."
- Domestos Total Blast – a toilet gel that "helps prevent tough dirt from sticking."-Discontinued
- Domestos Germ Blaster – a rimblock cage utensil advertised as being the "only rimblock that kills germs as it freshens."
- Domestos Turbo Fresh – A variant of the above advertised as being the "only rotating rimblock."
- Domestos Power 5 toilet cleaning.

== Marketing ==
The most famous advertising slogan for Domestos in the UK is "Kills all known germs. Dead." An earlier advertising slogan had been "Domestos kills 99% of all household germs." During the late 1980s and early 1990s, Unilever ran a new TV campaign which featured a pastiche of the song Big Bad John, in which a Domestos bottle moved around a bathroom in the style of a cowboy. In the UK version of the campaign, the chorus was changed to Big Bad Dom while in Germany, it was changed to Unser Dom ("Our Dom").

In 2002, a short-lived campaign featured former Big Brother contestant Alex Sibley, who appeared in an advert lampooning his own obsession with cleanliness. It included an incident in the house, where Alex mimed to the song "That's the Way (I Like It)" by KC and the Sunshine Band. In the advert, Alex was seen cleaning the Big Brother toilet with Domestos whilst miming to the same song. Domestos was hoping the popularity of Big Brother would help sell their product. However, by 2003, Domestos were in trouble and looking for other ways, to improve their marketing campaign.

In 2005, various adverts for different Domestos brands were shown on television and cinemas, with computer generated germ-like creatures made to represent Salmonella, E. coli and Staphylococcus. Each germ asserted its plans to inflict suffering, sometimes in parody of well-known films such as The Godfather, before being wiped out by a specific brand of Domestos. The advertising slogans for this campaign were "Domestos – Millions of Germs Will Die" for Standard Domestos, and "Domestos – Millions More Germs Will Die" for 5× Longer Domestos. The ads were animated at Passion Pictures and had actors like Willem Dafoe and Christian Slater as the voice of the germs.

The 5× Longer Domestos advert showed a germ cheerfully skipping and singing a song in a very deep American voice, reminiscent of narration in horror movie trailers.

Sung to the tune of "London Bridge Is Falling Down", the lyrics were:

I'm going to make some people vom,
People vom, people vom.
Spew their guts and cry to mom,
Ain't that pretty?

I'm going to give them diarrhoea, diarrhoea, diarrhoea...

The commercial ended with a voiceover of the slogan, read by famous British actor Patrick Stewart. The staple of CGI germs has remained in Domestos adverts until 2018 and was replaced by "Unstoppable" in some countries.

== In other countries ==
Domestos is known as Domex in Bangladesh, India, the Philippines, and Sri Lanka and is marketed with the claim of a "one-stop solution" to a household's cleaning requirements instead of using a different cleaner for kitchen surface, floor and bathroom. In Japan, the brand name Domesto (ドメスト, Domesuto) is known as a popular toilet cleaner. In the Netherlands, Domestos is sold under the name "Glorix", while in Vietnam, Argentina and Brazil it is known as "Vim", and in other countries as "Klinex", in Russia, Greece, Bulgaria and Kazakhstan it was sold there as Domestos (Дoместос), Glorix (Глорикс) and Klinex (Клинекс).
