= Gayatri Saraf =

Indian writer and headteacher

- Born: 17 August 1952 (age 74)
- Writing career
- Language: Odia
- Notable awards: Sahitya Akademi Award, 2017

Gayatri Saraf (born 17 August 1952) is an Indian writer.

== Awards ==
- Sahitya Akademi Award, 2017
