= Gayatri Devi (Madhya Pradesh politician) =

Indian politician

Gayatri Devi was an Indian politician from the state of the Madhya Pradesh. She represented Bijawar Vidhan Sabha constituency of undivided Madhya Pradesh Legislative Assembly by winning General election of 1957.
