= Gayatri Shah =

Member of the Nepalese Constituent Assembly

Miss Gayatri Shah (born c. 1982) was the youngest member of the 1st Nepalese Constituent Assembly out of 601 in total. She is a member of Janata Dal. She is also a member of the Youth Advisory Panel for the United Nations in Nepal. Shah entered politics after completing a master's degree in Political Science.
