= Gayatri Sankaran =

Indian Carnatic musician

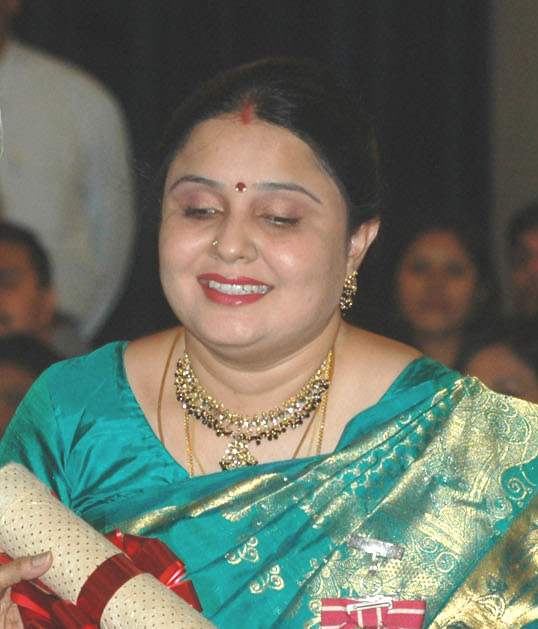
- Gayatri Sankaran receiving Padma Sri.
- Born: Samalkot, Andhra Pradesh, India
- Occupations: Carnatic Musician, vocalist, Violinist, Veena exponent
- Awards: Padma Shri; Role Model National Award; Surmani Award; Isai Chudar Award; Pallavi Singer Award; Best Teacher Award; Gana Kuyil Award; Rotary Professional Excellence Award; Indian Fine Arts Society Award; World Telugu Federation Award; Padma Sadhana Award; Ascendas Excellence Award; Kalaimamani Award; Swarna Tarangini Award
- Website: http://www.gayatrisankaran.com/

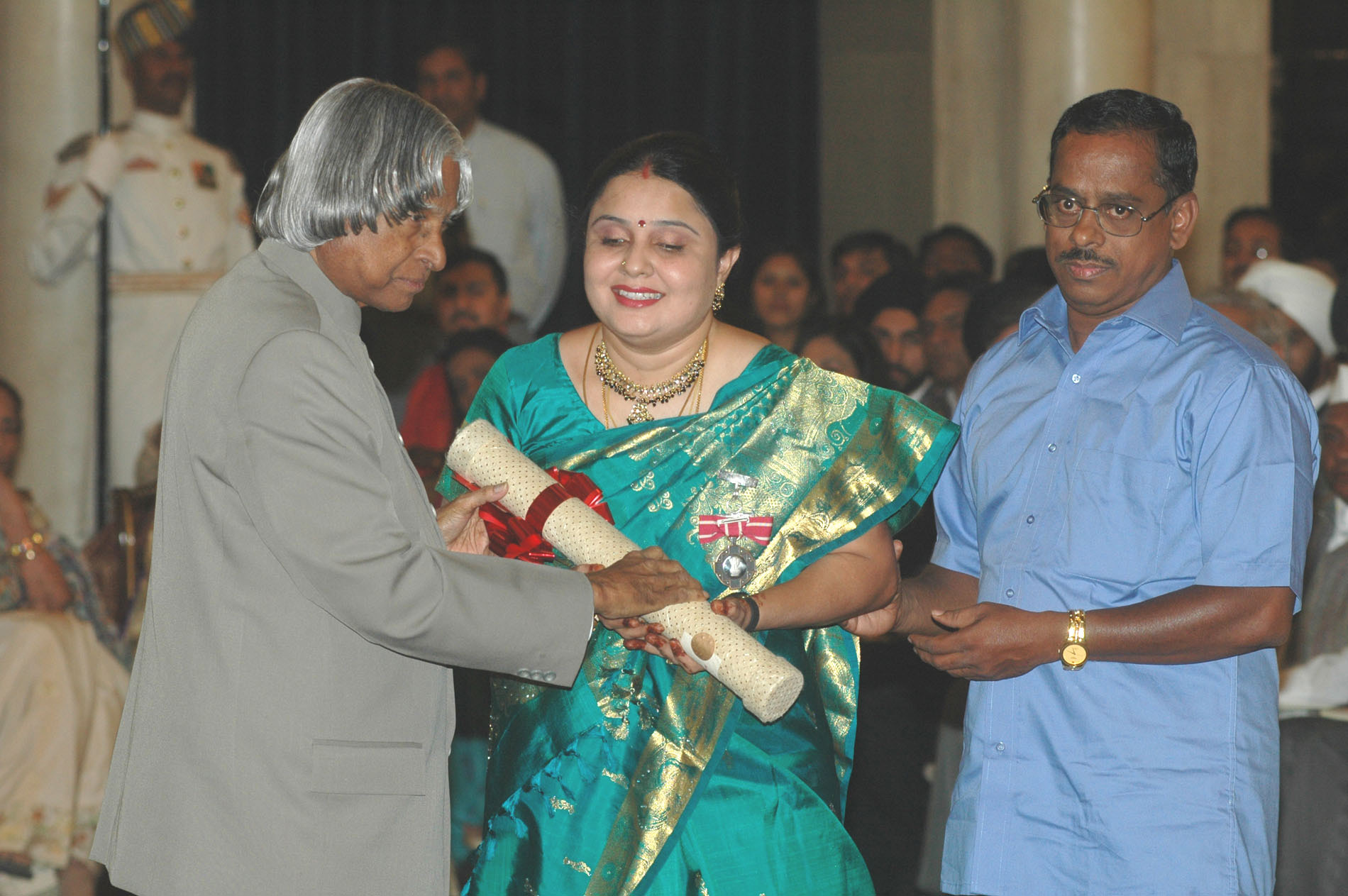
The President, Dr. A.P.J. Abdul Kalam presenting the Padma Shri Award – 2006 to visually challenged music prodigy Smt. (Dr.)Gayatri Sankaran, in New Delhi on March 20, 2006

Dr. Gayatri Sankaran is an Indian Carnatic musician and vocalist specialising in Carnatic vocals and violin performances. She is a recipient of the Kalaimamani award from Tamil Nadu Eyal Isai Nataka Manram, a unit of the Directorate of Art and Culture, Government of Tamil Nadu. The Government of India honoured her in 2006 with the award of Padma Shri, the fourth highest Indian civilian award for her contributions to music, making her the first visually impaired woman to receive the award.

== Biography ==
Dr. Gayatri Sankaran is a Carnatic Vocalist, Violist, Veena exponent. She hails from Samalkot, Andhra Pradesh and moved for long term to Thiruvanmiyur, Chennai. She started learning music at the age of three, from her mother, Subbulakshmi Gurunathan and later from Allamraju Someswara Rao. This brought her the opportunity to learn music at Kalakshetra of Rukmini Devi Arundale when the renowned danseuse was impressed with the young Gayatri where she learned under Pudukkodu Krishnamurthy and Vairamangalam S Lakshminarayanan and secured diploma and post graduate diploma in vocals and violin. She learnt violin under the guidance of Pakkala Ramados. Later, she had training under Lalgudi Jayaraman and under K. J. Yesudas, both renowned musicians. She started performing as a violin- accompanist. She joined the All India Radio as a staff artist to start her career in 1988 and continues to work there as a Top Grade artist in Carnatic music and B High Grade artist in light music and violin. She received a doctoral degree (PhD) for her thesis, Stylistic Analysis of Kalidaikurichi Vedanta Bhagavatar, from the University of Madras and teaches Carnatic Music for many students in-Person and Online from her home in Tiruvanmiyur She is reported to have developed braille notations for music and has performed at various places in India and abroad. She is also a member of the Programme Committee of the South Zone Cultural Centre, Ministry of Culture and the Awards Selection Committee Member of the Ministry of Social Justice and Empowerment, Government of India.

Gayatri, an empanelled artist of the Indian Council for Cultural Relations (ICCR), is a recipient of several awards and honours such as National Award for Role Model from the Ministry of Social Justice and Empowerment, Government of India, Surmani from the Sur Singer Samsath, Mumbai, Isai Chudar from Lioness club of South Chennai, Special Pallavi Singer from Krishna Gana Sabha, Best Teacher award from the Maragatham Chandrasekhar Trust, Gana Kuyil award from the Canada Hindu Cultural Council and the Professional Excellence Award from the Rotary Club of Madras. She has also received the Indian Fine Arts Society award thrice, World Telugu Federation award, Padma Sadhana award, Ascendas Excellence award and Swarna Tarangini award from Rajiv Gandhi National Institute of Youth Development. The Government of India awarded her the civilian honour of Padma Shri from Dr.APJ Abdul Kalam in 2006, making her the first visually challenged woman to receive the award. Tamil Nadu Eyal Isai Nataka Mandram of the Government of Tamil Nadu awarded her the title Kalaimamani in 2011.

== See also ==
- Rukmini Devi Arundale
- Lalgudi Jayaraman
- K. J. Yesudas
