= Society Tea =

Indian tea brand

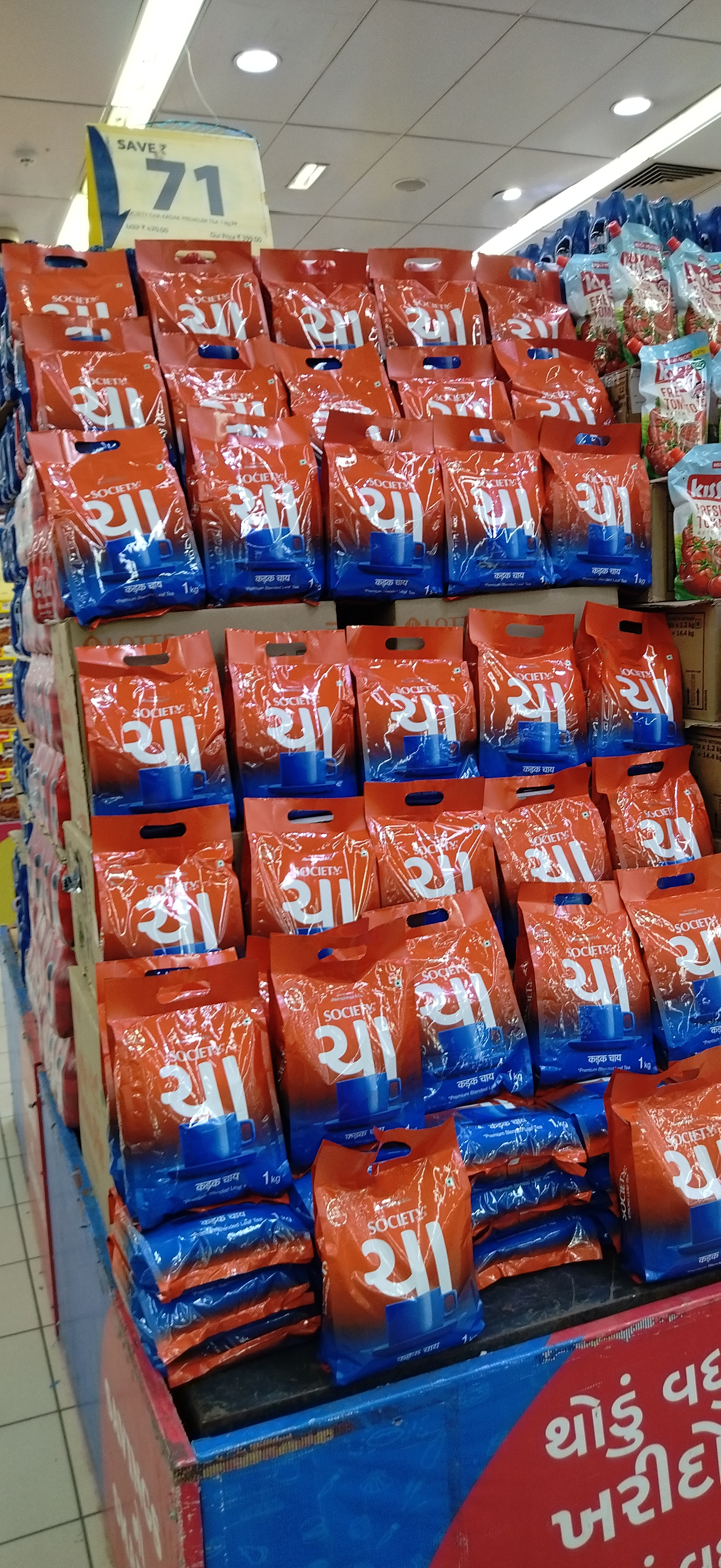
- Society Tea's Aisle, Reliance Mart, ISCON Mega Mall, Ahmedabad
- Company type: Private
- Industry: Food
- Founded: 1933; 93 years ago
- Founder: Hiravan Pranjivandas
- Headquarters: Mumbai, India
- Products: Tea
- Parent: Hasmukhrai & Co
- Website: societytea.com

Society Tea is an Indian tea brand headquartered in Mumbai. It is part of Hasmukhrai & Co tea blenders, founded in 1933. Besides Maharashtra, the brand is also present in other Indian states like Goa, Andhra Pradesh, Karnataka and Tamil Nadu.

== Origin and history ==
Hiravan Pranjivandas, the founder of Society Tea, started out as tea wholesaler in Mumbai's famous Masjid Bunder Chai Galli in 1924. The street was regarded as Maharashtra's source of tea as traders from different parts of the state would come here to purchase tea, to sell it locally. During this time, Das established tea trade with Middle Eastern countries. In 1933, he founded Hasmukhrai & Co to sell tea to the citizens of Mumbai. He established his first shop in Kalbadevi.

Hasmukhrai & Co became the market leader in Mumbai's tea Industry by the late 1980s. In 1991, the company management made the decision to switch to packaged tea sensing that customers would change the traditional patterns of purchasing tea and find it more convenient. This packaged tea was sold for retail, first in Mumbai and later in Maharashtra, in the name of Society Tea.
