= Gayathri Girish =

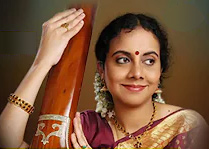
- Gayathri Girish

Background information
- Born: 9 October 1973 (age 52); Coimbatore, Tamil Nadu, India
- Genre: Carnatic vocalist
- Occupation: Singer

Gayathri “Kalaimamani” Girish is a Carnatic vocalist. She undertook an archival project titled “Azhwargalum Amudha Tamizhum” to render the Azhwar Pasurams (Divya Prabandams) on DD Podhigai television every week for 8 consecutive years. She serves on the artist panel for the ICCR (Indian Council for Cultural Relations) which is an autonomous organisation of the Government of India, involved in India's external cultural relations, through cultural exchange with other countries and their peoples.

== Early life and childhood ==
Gayathri Girish was born in Coimbatore and spent her growing years at Chennai. She has completed her undergraduate studies in Mathematics (Gold Medalist) and holds a post graduate degree in Computer Applications (MCA) both from Meenakshi College for Women, University of Madras, Chennai. Her childhood was entirely filled with music - having learnt to play the violin too briefly as a child. She pursued her saadhana in music religiously, attended numerous competitions, and won several prizes establishing herself as an artiste in the making right from her early years.

Her introduction to music began as a child at the age of 6 years under the guidance of her mother Padmini Srinivasan. She subsequently came under the tutelage of Vidwan Vaigal.S.Gnanaskandan and Padma Bhushan, Sangeetha Kalanidhi Madurai T.N.Seshagopalan. She is an “A-grade” artiste of All India Radio, Chennai and performs for Doordarshan and other private television channels. She specialises in lecture-sessions, thematic multi-media presentations integrating Bhakti and Carnatic Music and lecture-demonstrations.

== Career ==
=== Concert tours ===
Gayathri has presented concerts in numerous Sabhas and forums in India including at the Margazhi Isai Vizha (Madras Music Season) in Chennai’s Sabhas from the year 1990. She has travelled internationally and performed at the Cleveland Tyagaraja Aradhana, USA, Festival of India at Russia, Sydney Music Festival at Australia, ICCR Colombo etc. apart from touring Singapore, Malaysia, Muscat, London, USA etc. for concerts. She has delivered Pallavis with complex talas and Jugalbandhis.

=== Lecture demonstrations and paper presentations ===
Gayathri's Lec-Dems have covered subjects such as Sathguru Tyagaraja – the Innovator, Isai-tamizh anrum inrum (Tamil music then and now), Sanskrit compositions of Papanasam Sivan, Fundamentals of Music – for schools in Chennai, Handling of Raga Bhairavi by the Music trinity, The place of 'Varnam' in Carnatic Music, Popular Pallavis, Evolution of musical forms in the post-trinity period, Sankeerthana Rathnavali, Compositions of Margadarsi Seshayyangar etc. She has presented workshops on teamwork and leadership to Corporates such as SAP Labs. Papers presented include, 'The music of Muthusvami Dikshitar - a window into his personality' at the Swadeshi Indology Conference organised by BVB at Bangalore in 2019 and Vedanta and Music at the 22nd International Congress of Vedanta organised by the Special Center For Sanskrit Studies at JNU, New Delhi in December 2015

=== Multimedia presentations ===
Gayathri’s has delivered multi-media presentations on topics such as ‘Sapta Vitanka Sthalas of Tyagarajaswamy', 'Sri Tyagarajaya Namasthe', ‘The genius of Muthusvami Dikshitar’, ‘Nagareshu Kanchi’, ‘Compositions of Sathguru Tyagaraja on deities other than Lord Rama’, ‘Shiva-Shakti’, ‘Adi Shankara Bhagavadpada’, ‘Arupadai Veedu’, ‘Ma Ramanan - Uma Ramanan’, ‘Kshetra Darshan of Shiva and Shakti’, ‘Different Aspects of Shiva Bhakti’, ‘Myriad Forms of Lord Shiva’ etc.

=== Research under the aegis of the Ministry of Culture - Government of India ===
Gayathri's project "Myriad Forms of Lord Shiva”, a thematic multimedia production, was done under the Production Grant, instituted by the Ministry of Culture, New Delhi, and spanned an entire year from February 2013 to March 2014. This series was conceived as a concert-cum-multimedia presentation of temple architecture and iconography of the various forms of Lord Shiva, along with explanations of the nuances of the compositions, philosophical ideas, co-relating them appropriately to the context of authentic Sanskrit texts and treatises. She is also currently doing research work under the Senior Fellowship scheme instituted by the Ministry of Culture.

== Awards and recognition ==
- Ph D: Thesis on 'Journey towards liberation as seen through Muthusamy Dikshidar's Kritis' - Madras University Sanskrit department (Year 2021)
- 'Crazy' Mohan Award of Excellence – Crazy Creations (Year 2019)
- M S Subbulakshmi Puraskar – Varkala, Trivandrum (Year 2019)
- Sivan Isai Selvi – Papanasam Sivan Rasigar Sangam Chennai (Year 2017)
- Ustaad Bismillah Khan Yuva Puraskar – Sangeet Natak Akademi (Year 2014)
- Sangeetha Sarathy – Sri Matha Samarpanam Trust (Year 2013)
- Kalaimamani – Government of Tamilnadu (Year 2011)
- Kalai Nirai Mamani – Tamilnadu Government Music College (Year 2007)
- Isai Peroli – Karthik Fine Arts, Chennai (Year 2003)
- Dr.MLV award – Narada Gana Sabha, Chennai (Year 2002)
- Yuva Kala Bharati – Bharat Kalachar, Chennai (Year 2000)
- Gaana Rathna – Department of Cultural Affairs, Colombo (Year 1997)

== Discography ==
| Sl.No | Album | Released by |
| 1 | Karnaranjani | Amutham |
| 2 | Neelambari | Amutham |
| 3 | Rama Namam | Amutham |
| 4 | Carnatic Vocal | AVM |
| 5 | Ksetra - Arupadai Veedu | Charsur |
| 6 | Live in Concert- December 2007 | Charsur |
| 7 | Live in Concert- December 2012 | Charsur |
| 8 | Chamundi Ashttothara Kritis of Muthiah Bhagavatar – Volume 1 | Charsur |
| 9 | Chamundi Ashttothara Kritis of Muthiah Bhagavatar – Volume 2 | Charsur |
| 10 | Chamundi Ashttothara Kritis of Muthiah Bhagavatar – Volume 3 | Charsur |
| 11 | Vaishnavam | Charsur |
| 12 | Carnatic Vocal- Margam Series | HMV |
| 13 | Carnatic Vocal | HMV |
| 14 | Carnatic Vocal | INRECO |
| 15 | Swaraadesham | Kalavardhini |
| 16 | Devi Krithis | Kalavardhini |
| 17 | Sri Raja Rajeswari Andhadhi | Kalavardhini |
| 18 | Explosions- Fusion Album - Volume 1 | Kosmic Music |
| 19 | Explosions- Fusion Album - Volume 2 | Kosmic Music |
| 20 | Ultimate - Fusion Album | Kosmic Music |
| 21 | Thrayaa | Kosmic Music |
| 22 | Layam - Rhythmic Ecstasies | Music Today |
| 23 | Isaiye Oliye Inaindhidu | Nandalala Seva Samithi Trust |
| 24 | Isaikku Isaivan | Nandalala Seva Samithi Trust |
| 25 | Sri Matruka Pushpamala Stuti | Nandalala Seva Samithi Trust |
| 26 | Kunthalavarali | Rajalakshmi Audio |
| 27 | Madrasil Margazhi 2006-Music Academy Concert | Rajalakshmi Audio |
| 28 | 108 Divya Kshetra Krithis | Rukmini Ramani |
| 29 | Pratyaksha Deivame | Rukmini Ramani |
| 30 | Sunaadha Soundaryam | Sangeetha |
| 31 | Vande Vaasudevam | Sangeetha |
| 32 | Captivating Melodies | Sangeetha |
| 33 | Compositions of Trinity | Sangeetha |
| 34 | Carnatic Vocal | Sargam |
| 35 | Raaga Manjari | Swatisoft solutions |
| 36 | Paattu Dipamai Olirude – Swathi’s Sanskriti Series | Swatisoft solutions |
| 37 | Shiva-Shakthi- Double CD Album – Swatisoft Solutions | Swatisoft solutions |
| 38 | Classical Melodies | Vani Recording Company |
| 39 | Venu Gaanam | Vani Recording Company |
| 40 | Madhuram | Vijay Musicals |
| 41 | Bharatiyar Songs | Vijay Musicals |
| 42 | Varam Tarum Sri Anjaneya | Vijay Musicals |
| 43 | Sri Prasanna Venkatesa | Vijay Musicals |
| 44 | Aishwaryam Tarum Sri Lakshmi Hayagreevar | Vijay Musicals |
| 45 | Vetri Tarum Navagrahangal | Vijay Musicals |
| 46 | Siragiri Velava | Vijay Musicals |
| 47 | Tirukkanden | Vijay Musicals |
