= Gayatri Shunmugam =

Singaporean model and beauty queen (born 1986)

Gayatri Shunmugam (born June 2, 1986) is a Singaporean model and beauty queen.

== Biography ==
Gayatri was born in Singapore and moved to Chennai when she was just six months old. At the age of six she moved back to Singapore to complete her education. She studied in St. Margaret's Secondary School and then Saint Andrew's Junior College. After completing her degree, Shunmugam worked with Singapore Airlines as a flight attendant for two years and taught briefly at Saint Andrew's Secondary School.

She started modeling at the age of 18 and has appeared in advertisements for Intel and Beneath the Stars Jewellery. In May 2008, she came in as 2nd runner-up in Miss Singapore Universe 2008. She emerged as one of the major title winners as Miss Singapore 2008. She was the first Tamilian of Indian origin to have won a title at Singapore's most prestigious pageant.
