= Ved Mata Gaytri Mandir =

Ved Mata Gayatri Temple
- वेद माता गायत्री मंदिर
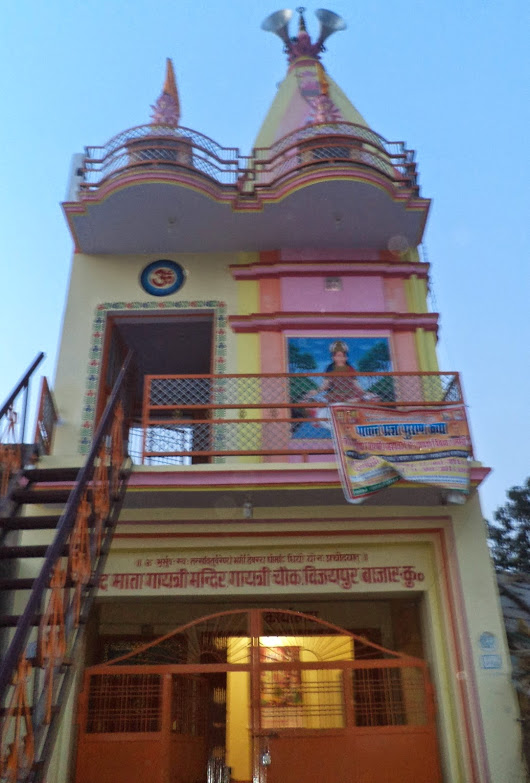
- Photo from the front of the temple

- map_caption

Religion
- Affiliation: Hinduism
- District: Kushinagar
- Deity: Maa Gayatri
- Festivals: Gayatri Jayanti, Vijayadashami, Krishna Janmashtami, Navratri

Location
- State: Uttar Pradesh
- Country: India
- Interactive map of Ved Mata Gayatri Temple
- Coordinates: 26.854349°N 83.802804°E

Architecture
- Type: Mandir
- Founder: Rampravesh Kushwaha
- Completed: 8 December 2013 (age 12)

Website
- Gayatri Mandir.in

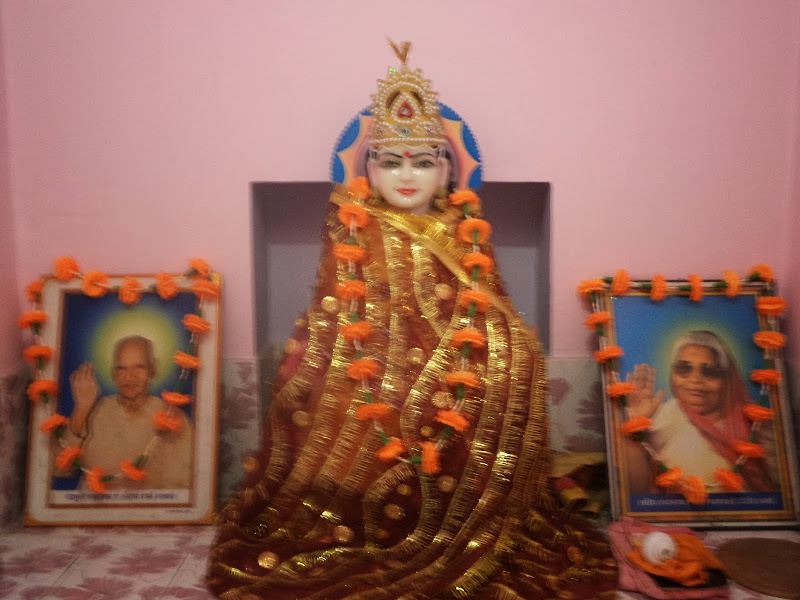
Maa Gaytri

Ved Mata Gaytri Temple is a Hindu temple of the Maa Gayatri Devi. The name Gayatri Mandir derives from the Acharya of Gayatri Mission, Gaytari Mandir is a famous Temple. The Gayatri Mandir is founded by Mr. Rampravesh Kushwaha.This Temple is situated in Kushinagar, Uttar Pradesh, India since a long time. Gayatri Mandir temple performs various cultural and social activities and serves as the cultural hub of the city. Gayatri Mandir Arrange every year Nav Kundiy Gaytri Gayatri Mhayagya. During Last Day of Yagya Gaytri Mandir also Arrange Mass wedding ceremonies (Garib Var-Kanyaon Ki Samoohik Vivah).
