= Pankajakasthuri Herbals =

Indian Ayurvedic company

Pankajakasthuri Herbal India (P) Ltd.
- Formerly: Sree Dhanwantari Ayurvedics
- Type: Private
- Founded: 1988; 38 years ago
- Founder: J. Hareendran Nair
- Headquarters: Tiruvananthapuram, India
- Products: OTC & Ayurvedic medicines
- Owner: J. Hareendran Nair
- Website: www.pankajakasthuri.in

Pankajakasthuri Herbals India Private Limited is an Ayurvedic medicine manufacturing company based in Tiruvananthapuram, Kerala. Established in 1988, Pankajakasthuri manufactures and develops Ayurvedic products and medicines. Pankajakasthuri is Kerala's first ISO 9000 certified Ayurvedic medicine manufacturing company.

Pankajakasthuri has over 450 Ayurvedic products spread over four categories - Ethical, Classical, FMCG and OTC. The manufacturing unit is located at Poovachal, Tiruvananthapuram.

J. Hareendran Nair, Founder and Managing Director of Pankajakasthuri, was honoured with the prestigious Padma Shri by the Government of India, for his efforts in the field of Ayurveda.

== History ==
Pankajakasthuri Herbals, founded by J. Hareendran Nair, started manufacturing Ayurvedic medicines under the brand name Sree Dhanwantari Ayurvedics, in 1988. The name was changed to Pankajakasthuri in 1996, and products were sold over-the-counter under this brand name. The brand name was coined after Hareendran Nair's mother, Pankajam and his eldest daughter Kasthuri.

== Products ==
OTC Category

- Breathe Eazy - Pankajakasthuri Herbals started production of its first Ayurvedic product, 'Pankajakasthuri Breathe Eazy' (previously known as Pankajakasthuri Granules) in 1990 under the category OTC.
- Pankajakasthuri introduced 'Pankajakasthuri Orthoherb' in 2009.
- Mygrane Oil

Classical Category

Classical division of Pankajakasthuri produces formulation and products as per the instructions suggested in Ayurvedic texts.

- Dashamoolarishtam
- Chyavanaprasham
- Agasthyarasayanam

FMCG

- Kasthuri herbal soap

== Pankajakasthuri Ayurveda Medical College ==
In 2002, J. Hareendran Nair established Pankajakasthuri Ayurveda Medical College in Kattakkada. It is the first self-financed Ayurveda Medical College in Kerala.

== Pankajakasthuri Herbal Research Foundation ==
In May 2020, ZingiVir-H tablet, an ayurvedic medicine developed by Pankajakasthuri Herbal Research Foundation was registered by the Clinical Trial Registry of India (CTRI), for clinical trials on COVID-19. Through scientific validation, the medicine has been found to be effective against respiratory syncytial virus and influenza virus.

== CSR ==
Padheyam, a program to serve food to the needy, was started by J. Hareendran Nair, the Founder and Managing Director of Pankajakasthuri Herbals. The program started off at Poovachal, Kerala, and serves breakfast, meals and tea to more than 1000 people every day. It employs 8 people for the task along with 2 others for coordination. Padheyam stands strongly against wastage of food and maintains a stringent procedure to monitor the same.

The food from Pankajakasthuri food center is also sent to the Regional Cancer Centre (R.C.C) through the 'Relieving Hunger' program of Lions Club, where it is served to around 300 the people on a daily basis.

== See also ==
- Dr J. Hareendran Nair
