= Baghmara, Jharkhand =

Village in the Dhanbad district

Baghmara Baghmara
- Village
- Baghmara Baliapur
- Location in Jharkhand, India Baghmara (India)
- Coordinates: 23°42′57″N 86°31′27″E
- Country: India
- State: Jharkhand
- District: Dhanbad

Government
  - Type: Representative democracy
  - Body: Baghmara Panchayat
  - Sarpanch: Sanjit Kumar Gorain

Area
  - Total: 10.67 km^{2} (4.12 sq mi)
  - Rank: 6
- Elevation: 196 m (643 ft)

Population (2011)
  - Total: 7,655
  - Density: 717.4/km^{2} (1,858/sq mi)

Languages
  - Official: Hindi, Bengali

Literacy (2011)
- Time zone: UTC+5:30 (IST)
- PIN: 828201 (Baliapur)
- Telephone/STD code: 0326
- Vehicle registration: JH 10
- Lok Sabha constituency: Dhanbad
- Vidhan Sabha constituency: Sindri
- Website: dhanbad.nic.in

Baghmara is a village in Baliapur CD Block in Dhanbad district of Jharkhand, India.The nearest railway station to Baghmara is Rakhitpur Station.

== Police station ==
Baliapur police station serves Baghmara Village.

== Transport ==
Deuli-Khairpal Road passes through Here.

== Education and Healthcare ==
There are 10 schools and 1 hospital in this Village.
