= Sangeet Natak Akademi Award =

Indian music award

- Award for contributions to Performing arts
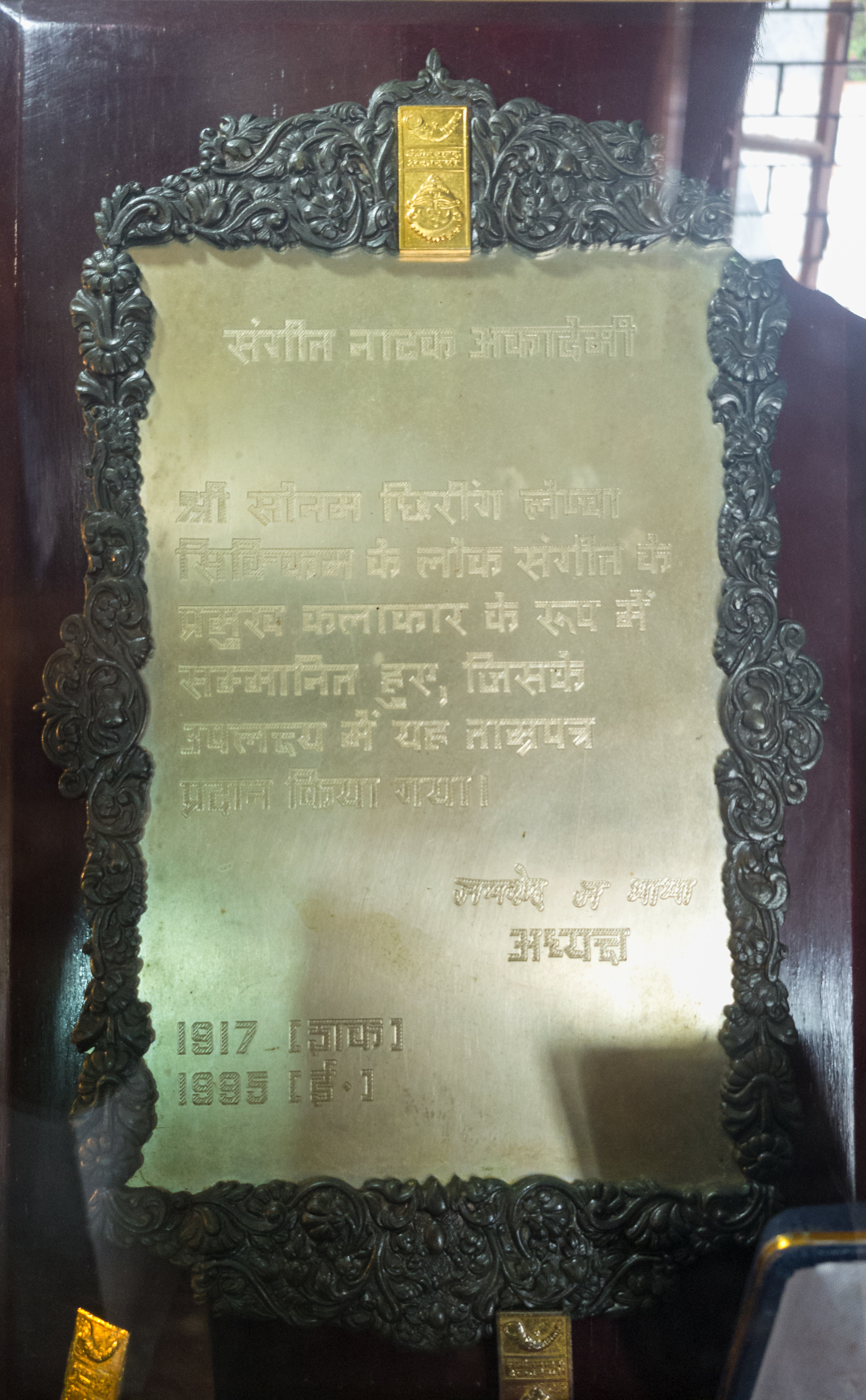
- Sangeet Natak Akademi Award to Sonam Tshering Lepcha
- Awarded for: Award for performing arts in India
- Sponsored by: Sangeet Natak Akademi
- First award: 1952
- Final award: 2023
- Website: www.sangeetnatak.gov.in/award-honours/ratna-awards

Sangeet Natak Akademi Award (IAST: Saṅgīta Nāṭaka Akādamī Puraskāra), also known as the Akademi Puraskar, is an award given by the Sangeet Natak Akademi, India's National Academy of Music, Dance & Drama. It is the highest Indian recognition given to people in the field of performing arts.

In 2003, the award consisted of ₹ 50,000, a citation, an angavastram (a shawl), and a tamrapatra (a brass plaque). Since 2009, the cash prize has been increased to ₹100,000. The awards are given in the categories of music, dance, theatre, other traditional arts and puppetry, and for contribution to performing arts.

== Award recipients ==
The recipients of the Sangeet Natak Akademi award in various categories of performing arts are listed below:

== Music ==
=== Hindustani music ===
==== Vocal ====
- 1952 – Mushtaq Hussain Khan
- 1953 – Kesarbai Kerkar
- 1954 – Rajab Ali Khan
- 1955 – Anant Manohar Joshi
- 1956 – Rajabhaiyya Poonchhwale
- 1957 – Rasoolan Bai
- 1958 – Ganesh Ramachandra Behere
- 1959 – Krishnarao Shankar Pandit
- 1960 – Altaf Hussain Khan
- 1961 – Y. S. Mirashi Buwa
- 1962 – Bade Ghulam Ali Khan
- 1963 – Omkarnath Thakur
- 1964 – Rahimuddin Khan Dagar
- 1965 – Hirabai Barodekar
- 1966 – Siddheswari Devi
- 1967 – Amir Khan
- 1968 – Mogubai Kurdikar
- 1969 – Ramchatur Mallick
- 1970 – Nisar Hussain Khan
- 1971 – Mallikarjun Mansur
- 1972 – Begum Akhtar
- 1973 – Gangubai Hangal
- 1974 – Kumar Gandharva
- 1975 – Bhimsen Joshi
- 1975-76 Gavri Devi (Vocal) (Jodhpur, Rajasthan)
- 1976 – Narayanrao Vyas
- 1977 – Girija Devi
- 1978 – Khadim Hussain Khan
- 1979 – Sarachchandra Arolkar
- 1980 – Nivruttibua Sarnaik
- 1981 – Basavaraj Rajguru
- 1982 – Vasantrao Deshpande
- 1983 – Mahadev Prasad Mishra
- 1984 – Sharafat Hussain Khan
- 1985 – Kishori Amonkar, Aminuddin Dagar
- 1986 – Gavri Devi (Vocal) (Jodhpur, Rajasthan)
- 1986 – Asgari Bai, Firoz Dastur, Manik Varma
- 1987 – C. R. Vyas, Shobha Gurtu, Pandit Jasraj,
- 1988 – Padmavati Gokhale Shaligram
- 1989 – Jitendra Abhisheki
- 1990 – K. G. Ginde, Dhondutai Kulkarni
- 1991 – N. Zahiruddin Dagar, Prabha Atre
- 1992 – Ramarao V. Naik, Shiv Kumar Shukla
- 1993 – Bala Saheb Poochwale, Rahim Fahimuddin Dagar
- 1994 – Sulochana Brahaspati, Zia Fariddudin Dagar
- 1995 – A. Kanan
- 1996 – Dinkar Kaikini, Hafeez Ahmed Khan
- 1997 – L. K. Pandit
- 1998 – Puttaraj Gawaigalu, Parveen Sultana, Rajan and Sajan Mishra
- 1999–2000 – Ajoy Chakraborty, Rita Ganguly, Malabika Kanan
- 2001 – Abhay Narayan Mallick, Sangameshwar Gurav, Malini Rajurkar
- 2002 – Sushila Rani Patel, Sharayu Kalekar
- 2003 – Ghulam Mustafa Khan, Yeshwant Balkrishna Joshi
- 2004 – Balwant Rai Bhatt, Tejpal Singh and Surinder Singh
- 2005 – S. C. R. Bhat, Ramashreya Jha
- 2006 – Vijay Kumar Kichlu, Rashid Khan
- 2007 – Vidyadhar Vyas, Govardhan Mishra
- 2008 – Ulhas Kashalkar, M.R. Gautam
- 2009 – Abdul Rashid Khan, Vasundhara Komkali
- 2010 – Chhannulal Mishra, Yashpaul
- 2011 – Shruti Sadolikar, Pandit Venkatesh Kumar
- 2012 – Shankar Lal Mishra, Rajashekhar Mansur, Ajay Pohankar
- 2013 – Ritwik Sanyal, Veena Sahasrabuddhe
- 2014 – Ashwini Bhide-Deshpande, Iqbal Ahmad Khan, Nathrao Neralkar
- 2015 – Mashkoor Ali Khan
- 2016 – Prabhakar Karekar
- 2017 – Lalith J. Rao, Umakant and Ramakant Gundecha - Gundecha Brothers
- 2018 – Mani Prasad, Madhup Mudgal
- 2019 – Vinayak Torvi, Prem Kumar Mallick
- 2020 – Sumitra Guha, Arati Ankalikar-Tikekar
- 2021 – Uday Bhawalkar, Subhra Guha
- 2022 – Devaki Pandit, Harvinder Singh
- 2023 – Kalapini Komkali, Vinod Kumar Dwivedi

==== Instrumental ====
===== Been/Rudra Veena/Vichitra Veena =====
- 1969 – Dabir Khan
- 1977 – Asad Ali Khan
- 1981 – Zia Mohiuddin Dagar
- 1994 – Pandit Gopal Krishan
- 2012 – Bahauddin Dagar

===== Flute =====
- 1983 – Pt. Hari Prasad Chaurasiya
- 1986 – Devendra Murdeshwar
- 1994 – Raghunath Seth
- 2010 – Nityanand Haldipur
- 2014 – Ronu Majumdar
- 2017 – Pt. Rajendra Prasanna
- 2019 – Chetan Joshi

===== Guitar =====
- 2005 – Brij Bhushan Kabra

===== Harmonium =====
- 2000 – Appa Jalgaonkar
- 2005 – Tulsidas Vasant Borkar
- 2022 – Dharamnath Mishra

===== Pakhavaj =====
- 1955 – Govind Rao Burhanpurkar
- 1965 – Sakharam Tavde
- 1967 – Ayodhya Prasad
- 1978 – Purushottam Das
- 1988 – Ramshankardas Pagaldas
- 1991 – Chatrapati Singh
- 1993 – Gopaldas Panse
- 1995 – Ram Ashish Pathak
- 2003 – Bhavani Shankar
- 2011 – Totaram Sharma
- 2020 – Dal Chand Sharma

===== Santoor =====
- 1986 – Shivkumar Sharma
- 1993 – Bhajan Sopori
- 2018 – Tarun Bhattacharya

===== Sarangi =====
- 1966 – Shakoor Khan
- 1975 – Ram Narayan
- 1976 – Gopal Misra
- 1986 – Sabri Khan
- 1988 – Hanuman Prasad Mishra
- 1990 – Abdul Lateef Khan
- 1992 – Sultan Khan
- 1996 – Inderlal Dhandra, Ramchandra Mishra
- 2008 – Ramesh Mishra
- 2013 – Dhruba Ghosh
- 2023 – Moinuddin Khan

===== Sarod =====
*1952 – Allauddin Khan
- 1953 – Hafiz Ali Khan
- 1963 – Ali Akbar Khan
- 1971 – Radhika Mohan Maitra
- 1986 – Sharan Rani Backliwal
- 1988 – Zarin Sharma
- 1989 – Amjad Ali Khan
- 1993 – Buddhadev Das Gupta
- 1999–2000 – Rajeev Taranath
- 2004 – Aashish Khan
- 2018 – Tejendra Majumdar
- 2022 – Basant Kabra

===== Shehnai =====
- 1956 – Ustad Bismillah Khan
- 1985 – Ali Hussain Khan
- 1989 – Pt. Anant Lal
- 1996 – Pt. Raghunath Prasanna
- 2008 – Krishna Ram Chaudhary
- 2009 – Ali Ahmad Hussain
- 2017 – Rajendra Prasanna

===== Sitar =====
- 1958 – Yusuf Ali
- 1960 – Wahid Khan
- 1962 – Pt. Ravi Shankar
- 1968 – Mushtaq Ali Khan
- 1974 – Nikhil Banerjee
- 1987 – Abdul Halim Jaffer Khan, Imrat Khan (also Surbahar)
- 1989 – Balaram Pathak
- 1992 – Uma Shankar Mishra
- 1994 – Shamim Ahmed Khan
- 1996 – Debu Chaudhuri
- 2001 – Manilal Nag
- 2003 – Arvind Parikh
- 2006 – Shahid Parvez
- 2010 – Budhaditya Mukherjee
- 2015 – Karthick Kumar
- 2019 – Manju Mehta
- 2020 – Kushal Das
- 2023 –Harvinder Kumar Sharma

===== Surbahar =====
- 1991 – Annapurna Devi
- 2011 – Pushparaj Koshti

===== Tabla =====
- 1954 – Ustad Ahmed Jan Thirakwa
- 1959 – Ustad Jahangir Khan
- 1961 – Pt. Kanthe Maharaj
- 1970 – Masit Khan
- 1976 – Karamatulla Khan
- 1979 – Pt. Samta Prasad
- 1982 – Ustad Alla Rakha
- 1984 – Pt. Kishan Maharaj
- 1990 – Ustad Zakir Hussain
- 1991 – Shaikh Dawood
- 1997 – Swapan Chaudhuri, Lalji Gokhale
- 1998 – Pandharinath Gangadhar Nageshkar
- 1999–2000 – Shankar Ghosh
- 2001 – Ishwar Lal Mishra
- 2002 – Suresh B. Gaitonde, Anindo Chatterjee
- 2004 – Pt. Suresh Talwalkar
- 2006 – Kumar Bose
- 2007 – Nandan Mehta
- 2009 – Lachman Singh Seen
- 2012 – Sabir Khan (Tabla)
- 2013 – Hashmat Ali Khan
- 2014 – Pt. Nayan Ghosh
- 2016 – Arvind Mulgaonkar
- 2017 – Pt. Yogesh Samsi
- 2021 – Ravindra Yavagal

===== Violin =====
- 1972 – Gajananrao Joshi
- 1980 – V. G. Jog
- 1990 – N. Rajam
- 1995 – D. K. Datar
- 1996 – Annavarapu Rama Swamy
- 1997 – Sisir Kana Dhar Chowdhury
- 2007 – Ramoo Prasad Shastri
- 2016 – Kala Ramnath
- 2021 – Sangeeta Shankar
- 2023 – H. K. Venkatram

=== Carnatic music ===
==== Vocal ====
- 1952 – Ariyakudi Ramanuja Iyengar
- 1953 – Semmangudi R. Srinivasa Iyer
- 1954 – Mysore K. Vasudevacharya
- 1955 – Maharajapuram Vishwanatha Iyer
- 1956 – M. S. Subbulakshmi
- 1957 – Musiri Subramania Iyer
- 1958 – Chembai Vaidyanatha Bhagavathar
- 1959 – G. N. Balasubramaniam
- 1960 – Madurai Mani Iyer
- 1961 – Mudikondan C. Venkatarama Iyer
- 1962 – D. K. Pattammal
- 1963 – B. Devendrappa
- 1964 – Chittoor S. Subramanyam
- 1965 – T. Brinda
- 1966 – Madurai Srirangam Iyengar
- 1967 – C. Venkata Rao
- 1968 – Alathur Srinivasa Iyer
- 1969 – Dandapani Desikar
- 1970 – M. L. Vasanthakumari
- 1971 – N. Channakeshaviah
- 1972 – T. Muktha
- 1973 – B.S. Raja Iyengar
- 1974 – M. D. Ramanathan
- 1975 – M. Balamurali Krishna
- 1976 – K.V.Narayanaswamy
- 1977 – Sripada Pinakapani
- 1978 – Madurai S. Somasundaram
- 1979 – R K Srikanthan
- 1980 – Seerkhazhi S. Govindarajan
- 1981 – Radha and Jayalakshmi
- 1982 – T. M. Thiagarajan
- 1983 – D. K. Jayaraman
- 1984 – Maharajapuram V. Santhanam
- 1985 – Voleti Venkatesvarulu
- 1986 – B. Rajam Iyer
- 1986 – Nedunuri Krishnamoorthy
- 1987 – Madurai N. Krishnan
- 1987 – Mani Krishnaswami
- 1988 – Nookala Chinna Satyanarayana
- 1989 – Titte Krishna Iyengar
- 1990 – T. V. Sankaranarayanan
- 1991 – S. Rajam
- 1992 – K. R. Kumaraswamy Iyer
- 1993 – Trichy Swaminathan Iyer
- 1994 – C. S. Krishna Iyer
- 1995 – R. Vedavalli
- 1996 – T. K. Govinda Rao
- 1997 – M. S. Balasubramanya Sarma
- 2000 – S. R. Janakiraman
- 2001 – B. V. Raman
- 2002 – T. R. Subramaniam
- 2003 – Trichur V. Ramachandran, M. A. Narasimhachar
- 2004 – Thiruvengadu A. Jayaraman, C. Saroja & C. Lalitha
- 2005 – S. V. Parthasarrathy, P. S. Narayanaswamy
- 2006 – D. Pasupathi, Chingleput Ranganathan
- 2007 – B. Krishnamoorti
- 2008 – Puranam Purushottama Sastri
- 2009 – Parassala B Ponnammal
- 2010 – Suguna Purushothaman, Mysore Nagamani Srinath
- 2011 – J. Venkataraman
- 2012 – O. S. Thyagarajan
- 2013 – Aruna Sairam, D. Seshchari & D. Raghavachari (Hyderabad Brothers)
- 2014 – Neyveli Santhanagopalan
- 2015 – R.N. Tharanathan, Suguna Varadachari, R.N. Thiagarajan
- 2016 – Neela Ramgopal, K. Omanakutty
- 2017 – M. S. Sheela
- 2018 – Alamelu Mani, Malladi Suribabu
- 2019 – Charumathi Ramachandran, Palai C.K. Ramachandran
- 2020 – R. K. Padmanabha, G. Balakrishna Prasad
- 2021 – Sudha Ragunathan, Radha Namboodiri
- 2022 – Maharajapuram S. Ramachandran, Manda Sudharani
- 2023 – Bombay Jayashri, Shankar Sastry

==== Instrumental ====
===== Clarinet =====
- 1994 – A. K. C. Natarajan

===== Flute =====
- 1954 – Palladam Sanjiva Rao
- 1961 – T. N. Swaminatha Pillai
- 1965 – T. R. Mahalingam
- 1984 – Natesan Ramani
- 1987 – T. Viswanathan
- 1989 – Sikkil Sisters - Kunjumani & Neela
- 1997 – Kesi Narayanaswamy
- 1999–2000 – T.S Sankaran
- 2004 – Prapancham Sitaram
- 2017 – Shashank Subramanyam
- 2019 – Sikkil Mala Chandrasekar

===== Ghatam =====
- 1988 – Thetakudi Harihara Vinayakram
- 1995 – Umayalpuram K. Narayanaswamy
- 2011 – E. M. Subramaniam
- 2014 – Sukanya Ramgopal
- 2025 – Tripunithura N. Radhakrishnan

===== Gottuvadhyam =====
- 1958 – Budaloor Krishnamurthy Shastri
- 2006 – N. Ravikiran

===== Kanjira =====
- 2001 – G. Harishankar

===== Mandolin =====
- 2009 – U. Srinivas

===== Mridangam =====
- 1956 – Palghat Mani Iyer
- 1975 – C.S. Murugabhupathy
- 1979 – Kolanka Venkata Raju
- 1983 – Palghat R. Raghu
- 1987 – T. K. Murthy
- 1990 – T. V. Gopalakrishnan
- 1991 – Vellore G. Ramabhadran
- 1992 – Umayalpuram K. Sivaraman
- 1994 – Dandamudi Ramamohan Rao
- 1996 – Guruvayur Dorai
- 1998 – Karaikudi Mani
- 1999–2000 – V. Kamalakar Rao
- 2002 – Yella Venkateshwara Rao
- 2004 – Madras A. Kannan
- 2006 – Thiruvarur Bakthavathsalam
- 2008 – Mannargudi Easwaran
- 2009 – Dandamudi Sumathi Ram Mohan Rao
- 2010 – Srimushnam V. Raja Rao
- 2012 – K. V. Prasad
- 2013 – Trichy Sankaran
- 2016 – J. Vaidhyanathan
- 2017 – Tiruvarur Vaidyanathan
- 2019 – Trivandrum V. Surendran
- 2020 – Patri Satish Kumar
- 2023 – Neyveli Narayanan
- 2025 – T. S. Nandakumar, Anoor Anantha Krishna Sharma

===== Nadaswaram =====
- 1955 – T. N. Rajarathinam Pillai
- 1962 – Thiruvengadu Subramania Pillai
- 1966 – P. S. Veeruswamy Pillai
- 1972 – T. S. Natarajasundaram Pillai
- 1976 – Sheik Chinna Moulana
- 1981 – Namagiripettai Krishnan
- 1995 – Domada Chittiabbayi
- 2005 – Ongale N. Rangaiah
- 2007 – S. R. D. Vaidyanathan
- 2011 – Seshampatti T Sivalingam
- 2013 – Thiruvizha Jayashankar
- 2017 – S.Kasim, S.Babu - Kasim-Babu Brothers

===== Saxophone =====
- 2003 – Kadri Gopalnath

===== Thavil =====
- 1985 – Valangaiman A. Shanmugasundaram Pillai
- 1988 – Valayapatti A. R. Subramaniam
- 2001 – Haridwaramangalam A. K. Palanivel
- 2014 – Thiruvalaputhur T A Kaliyamurthy
- 2021 – Thanjavur R. Govindarajan
- 2022 – Vinukonda Subrahmanyam

===== Veena =====
- 1952 – Karaikudi Sambasiva Iyer
- 1960 – L. Subramanya Sastri
- 1968 – K. S. Narayanaswamy
- 1969 – Devakottai A. Narayana Iyengar
- 1970 – Mysore V. Doreswamy Iyengar
- 1973 – Emani Sankara Sastry
- 1977 – S. Balachander
- 1980 – Thanjavur K. P. Sivanandam
- 1986 – Rajeswari Padmanabhan
- 1988 – R. Pichumani Iyer
- 1990 – Chitti Babu
- 1992 – M. K. Kalyanakrishna Bhagavathar
- 1993 – Kalpakam Swaminathan
- 2001 – R. N. Doreswamy
- 2002 – E. Gayathri
- 2007 – Vidya Shankar
- 2011 – Ayyagari Syamasundaram
- 2017 – Suma Sudhindra
- 2021 – D. Balakrishnan
- 2022 – Jayanthi Kumaresh

===== Violin =====
- 1953 – Dwaram Venkataswamy Naidu
- 1957 – Tirumakudalu Chowdiah
- 1959 – Kumbakonam Rajamanickam Pillai
- 1963 – T. K. Jayarama Iyer
- 1964 – K. N. Chinnaswamy Iyer
- 1967 – K. S. Venkataramiah 'Papa'
- 1971 – Madurai S. Subramanya Iyer
- 1974 – T. N. Krishnan
- 1978 – Lalgudi Jayaraman
- 1982 – M. S. Gopalakrishnan
- 1986 – M. Chandrasekaran
- 1988 – Chalakudy N. S. Narayanaswamy
- 1989 – R. K. Venkatarama Sastry
- 1991 – Kandadevi S. Alagiriswamy
- 1993 – Kunnakudi Vaidyanathan
- 1996 – Annavarapu Ramaswamy
- 1997 – T. Rukmini
- 1998 – M. S. Anantharaman
- 1999–2000 – R. R. Keshavamurthy
- 2003 – A. Kanyakumari
- 2005 – V. V. Subrahmanyam
- 2008 – B. Sasikumar
- 2010 – Nagai Muralidharan
- 2012 – Mysore M. Nagaraja
- 2014 – Dwaram Durga Prasad Rao
- 2015 – Lalgudi G. J. R. Krishnan
- 2016 – Mysore Manjunath
- 2018 – Ganesh and Kumaresh
- 2020 – M. A. Sundareswaran
- 2023 – H. K. Venkatram

=== Creative and experimental music ===
- 1973 – Vishnudas Shirali
- 1976 – Timir Baran Bhattacharya
- 1978 – Rai Chand Boral
- 1982 – Vijay Raghav Rao
- 1983 – Chidambaram S. Jayaraman
- 1986 – Anil Biswas
- 1986 – M. B. Srinivasan
- 1986 – Hemanta Kumar Mukhopadhyay
- 1988 – Bhaskar Chandavarkar
- 1989 – Vanraj Bhatia
- 1990 – L. Subramaniam
- 1994 – V. Balsara
- 1995 – Atul Desai
- 1997 – Satish Bhatia
- 1998 – Vishwa Mohan Bhatt
- 2001 – S. Rajaram
- 2002 – K. P. Udayabhanu
- 2007 – Khayyam
- 2012 – Ilaiyaraaja
- 2020 – Bickram Ghosh
- 2022 – Purushottam Upadhyay, Osman Mir
- 2023 – S. Shekhar, Niladri Kumar

=== Other major traditions of music ===
- 1986 - Chhabi Banerjee (Kirtan song of West Bengal)
- 1996 – Hemanta Kumar Jamatia (Folk and tribal music of Tripura)
- 2008 – Ningombam Ibobi Singh (Nata Sankirtana, Manipur)
- 2009 – L. Ibohalmacha Singh (Nata Sankirtana, Manipur)
- 2010 – M.V. Simhachala Sastry (Harikatha, Tirupathi)
- 2011 – Gopal Chandra Panda (Odissi Music)
- 2012 – Bhai Balbir Singh Ragi (Gurbani)
- 2013 – Bankim Sethi (Odissi Music)
- 2015 – Hridaynath Mangeshkar (Sugam Sangeet), Prafulla Kar (Sugam Sangeet), Bhupinder Singh (Sugam Sangeet)
- 2018 – Suresh Wadkar (Sugam Sangeet), Shanti Hiranand (Sugam Sangeet), H. Ashangbi Devi (Nata Sankirtana, Manipur)
- 2019 – O. S. Arun (Sugam Sangeet), Sharma Bandhu (Sugam Sangeet), D. Uma Maheshwari (Harikatha)
- 2020 – Anup Jalota (Sugam Sangeet), N. Irabot Singh (Nata Sankirtana)
- 2021 – Susmita Das (Sugam Sangeet), H. R. Leelavathi (Sugam Sangeet), Kumud Diwan (Thumri)
- 2022 – Sapam Kullabi Singh (Nata Pung), Sitaram Singh (Sugam Sangeet)
- 2023 – L. V. Gangadhara Sastry, Sangita Gosain (Oddissi Music)
- 2023-[Bharat Sharma Vyas(Folk Music-Bihar)
- 2026 - Mahendra Ram for Rasan Chauki folk tunes of Mithila

== Dance ==
=== Bharatanatyam ===
- 1955 – T. Balasaraswati
- 1957 – Rukmini Devi Arundale
- 1959 – Mylapore Gowri Amma
- 1962 – R. Muthurathnambal
- 1965 – P. Chockkalingam Pillai
- 1966 – Vazhuvoor B. Ramiah Pillai, Swarnasaraswathi
- 1968 – Kamala
- 1969 – T. K. Swaminatha Pillai
- 1970 – Shanta Rao
- 1971 – T. Chandrakanthamma
- 1972 – Sikkil Ramaswami Pillai
- 1973 – Kumbakonam K. Bhanumathi
- 1974 – K. P. Kittappa Pillai
- 1976 – M. Muthiah Pillai
- 1977 – Yamini Krishnamurthy
- 1979 – Pandanallur Subbaraya Pillai
- 1981 – Indrani Rahman
- 1982 – Vyjayanthimala
- 1983 – Padma Subramanyam
- 1984 – Subramaniam Sarada, Sudharani Raghupathy
- 1985 – T. K. Mahalingam Pillai
- 1986 – Krishnaveni Lakshmanan
- 1987 – U. S. Krishna Rao and Chandrabhaga Devi, Chitra Viswaswaran
- 1989 – V. S. Muthuswamy Pillai
- 1990 – Kalanidhi Narayanan
- 1991 – Adyar K. Lakshman
- 1992 – K. J. Sarasa
- 1993 – Guru Kubernath Tanjorkar(Tanjavurkar), C. V. Chandrasekhar
- 1994 – V. P. Dhananjayan and Shanta Dhananjayan
- 1995 – M. K. Saroja, Indira Rajan
- 1996 – Sarada Hoffman
- 1997 – Kanaka Srinivasan
- 1998 – Lakshmi Viswanathan
- 1999–2000 – K. Kalyanasundaram Pillai, Leela Samson, H. R. Keshava Murthy
- 2001 – Alarmel Valli, Pratibha Prahlad
- 2002 – Malavika Sarukkai
- 2003 – C.K. Balagopalan
- 2004 – Nirmala Ramachandran
- 2005 – R. Rhadha
- 2006 – S. Narmada
- 2007 – Sucheta Bhide Chapekar
- 2008 – Saroja Vaidyanathan
- 2009 – Ananda Shankar Jayant
- 2011 – Narthaki Nataraj (First Transgender to receive SN Akademi Award)
- 2012 – Priyadarsini Govind
- 2013 – Jamuna Krishnan, B. Herabhanathan
- 2014 – Adayar Janardanan
- 2015 – Ranganayaki Jayaraman
- 2016 – Geeta Chandran
- 2017 – Rama Vaidyanathan
- 2018 – Radha Sridhar
- 2019 – Vasundhara Doraswamy
- 2020 – Meenakshi Chitharanjan
- 2021 – Jayalakshmi Eshwar
- 2022 – Manjula Ramaswamy
- 2023 – Urmila Satyanarayana

=== Chhau ===
- 1963 – Sudhendra Narayan Singh Deo (Seraikella)
- 1971 – Ananta Charan Sai (Mayurbhanj)
- 1975 – Krishna Chandra Naik (Mayurbhanj)
- 1981 – Kedar Nath Sahoo (Seraikella)
- 1982 – Gambhir Singh Mura (Purulia)
- 1987 – Madan Mohan Lenka (Mayurbhanj)
- 1988 – Srihari Nayak (Mayurbhanj)
- 1990 – Bikram Kumbhakar (Seraikella)
- 1991 – Chandra Sekhar Bhanj (Mayurbhanj)
- 2004 – Shashadhar Acharya
- 2012 – Jai Narayan Samal
- 2014 – Jagru Mahato
- 2015 – Sadashiva Pradhan
- 2016 – Gopal Prasad Dubey
- 2017 – Janmajay Saibabu
- 2018 – Tapan Kumar Pattanayak (Seraikella)
- 2019 – Brajendra Kumar Pattnaik
- 2020 – Trilochan Mohanta
- 2021 – Bhuvan Kumar
- 2022 – Sadhucharan Mahato
- 2023 – Parikshit Mahato

=== Creative dance/Choreography ===
- 1960 – Uday Shankar
- 1970 – Mrinalini Sarabhai
- 1976 – Narendra Sharma
- 1979 – Prabhat Ganguli
- 1980 – R. K. Priyagopal Sana
- 1981 – Parvati Kumar
- 1984 – Rajkumar Singhajit Singh
- 1989 – Maya Rao
- 1991 – Chandralekha
- 1992 – Sachin Shankar
- 1993 – Manjusri Chaki Sircar
- 1995 – Astad Deboo
- 1999–2000 Mallika Sarabhai
- 2001 – Gul Bardhan
- 2002 – Sambhu Bhattacharya
- 2005 – Th. Chaotombi Singh
- 2006 – Gorima Hazarika
- 2008 – Yog Sunder Desai
- 2009 – Daksha Sheth
- 2010 – Uttara Asha Coorlawala
- 2011 – Tanushree Shankar
- 2014 – Navtej Singh Johar
- 2015 – W. Lokendrajit Singh
- 2016 – Anita Ratnam
- 2018 – Deepak Mazumdar
- 2019 – Mamata Shankar
- 2020 – Bhushan Lakhandri
- 2022 – Bharat Sharma
- 2023 – Nirupama Rajendra

=== Kathak ===
- 1955 – Shambhu Maharaj
- 1957 – Baijnath Prasad "Lacchu Maharaj"
- 1959 – Sunder Prasad
- 1962 – Mohanrao Kallianpurkar
- 1964 – Birju Maharaj
- 1968 – Damayanti Joshi
- 1969 – Sitara Devi
- 1974 – Gauri Shankar Devilal Kathak
- 1975 – Roshan Kumari
- 1979 – Rohini Bhate
- 1982 – Kartik Ram, Kumudini Lakhia
- 1984 – Durga Lal
- 1987 – Uma Sharma
- 1991 – Reba Vidyarthi
- 1995 – Ramlal Bareth
- 1996 – Rani Karnaa
- 1998 – Sunderlal Sathyanarayan Gangani
- 1999–2000 – Shovana Narayan
- 2000 – Surendra Saikia
- 2002 – Rajendra Gangani
- 2003 – Sunayana Hazarilal Agarwal, Urmila Nagar
- 2004 – Saswati Sen
- 2005 – Tirath Ram Azad
- 2006 – Munna Shukla
- 2007 – Geetanjali Lal
- 2008 – Shashi Sankhla
- 2009 – Prerana Shrimali
- 2010 – Malabika Mitra
- 2011 – Manjushree Chatterjee
- 2012 – Vijay Shankar
- 2013 – Rajashree Shirke
- 2014 – Uma Dogra
- 2016 – Jitendra Maharaj
- 2017 – Shobha Koser
- 2018 – Maulik Shah, Ishira Parikh
- 2019 – Raghav Raj Bhatt & Mangala Bhatt
- 2020 – Kumkum Dhar
- 2021 – Shama Bhate
- 2022 – Kamalini Asthana and Nalini Asthana
- 2023 – Jagdish Gangani
- 2024 - Bipul Chandra Das
- 2025 - Ram Mohan Maharaj, Krishna Mohan Mishra Maharaj, Bhaswati Mishra

=== Kathakali ===
- 1956 – Guru Kunchu Kurup
- 1958 – Thotton K. Chandu Panikkar
- 1961 – Thekkinkattil Ravunni Nair
- 1963 – Chenganoor Raman Pillai
- 1965 – Guru Gopinath
- 1967 – Kalamandalam Krishnan Nair
- 1968 – Kurichi Kunjan Panickar
- 1969 – Vazhenkada Kunchu Nair
- 1970 – Mankulam Vishnu Namboothiri
- 1971 – Kudamaloor Karunakaran Nair
- 1972 – M. Madhava Panicker
- 1973 – Vellinezhi K. Nanu Nayar
- 1973 – Kavungal Chathunni Panicker
- 1974 – Kalamandalam Ramankutty Nair
- 1975 – K. Sankarankutty Panicker
- 1983 – Champakulam Pachu Pillai
- 1985 – Mankompu Sivasankara Pillai
- 1987 – Kalamandalam Gopi
- 1988 – Keezhpadam Kumaran Nair
- 1989 – Oyoor Kochugovinda Pillai
- 1991 – Chennithala Chellappan Pillai
- 1993 – Kalamandalam Padmanabhan Nair
- 1996 – Kottakkal Krishnan Kutty Nair
- 1997 – Madavoor Vasudevan Nair
- 1998 – Kottakkal Sivaraman
- 1999–2000 – Nelliyode Vasudevan Namboodiri
- 2003 – Sadanam P. V. Balakrishnan
- 2004 – Kalamandalam Vasu Pisharody
- 2005 – Mathoor Govindan Kutty
- 2006 – Kottakkal Chandrasekharan
- 2007 – Sadanam Krishnankutty
- 2008 – Kalamandalam Kuttan
- 2009 – Kalamandalam Rajan
- 2010 – Kalamandalam K. G. Vasudevan Nair
- 2011 – Thonnakkal Peethambaran
- 2012 – Vazhengada Vijayan
- 2013 – Kalamandalam M. P. S. Namboodiri
- 2015 – Parassini Kunhiraman Nair
- 2016 – Kalamandalam Ramachandran Unnithan
- 2017 – Madambi Subramanian Namboodiri
- 2019 – Kottakkal Nandakumaran Nair
- 2021 – Inchakkattu Ramachandran Pillai
- 2022 – Kalamandalam Balasubramanian
- 2023 – Margi Vijayakumar

=== Kuchipudi ===
- 1961 – Vedantam Satyanarayana Sarma ‘Satyam’
- 1968 – Chinta Krishnamurthy
- 1978 – C. Ramacharyalu
- 1981 – Vempati Chinna Satyam
- 1983 – Nataraja Ramakrishna (also Bharatanatyam)
- 1985 – Vedantam Prahlada Sarma
- 1987 – Pasumarthi Venugopala Krishna Sarma
- 1990 – Sobha Naidu
- 1991 – Raja Reddy and Radha Reddy
- 1993 – Josyula Seetharamaiah
- 1994 – Vedantam Parvateesam
- 1998 – Veernala Jayarama Rao and Banashree Rao
- 1999–2000 – Swapnasundari
- 2003 – K. Uma Rama Rao
- 2004 – Pasumarthi Seetha Ramiah
- 2005 – Korada Narasimha Rao
- 2006 – Pasumarthi Rathiah Sarma
- 2007 – Yelesarapu Nageswara Sarma
- 2008 – Vasanta Lakshmi and Narasimhachari
- 2009 – Vyjayanthi Kashi
- 2010 – Ratna Kumar
- 2011 – Alekhya Punjala
- 2012 – Vedantam Ramalinga Sastry
- 2013 – Chinta Seetha Ramanjaneyulu
- 2014 – Vedantam Radhesyam
- 2015 – Gaddam Padmaja Reddy
- 2016 – A B Bala Kondala Rao
- 2017 – Deepika Reddy
- 2018 – Pasumarthy Ramalinga Sastry
- 2019 – Manju Barggavee
- 2020 – Pasumarthy Vithal and Bharathi Vithal
- 2021 – N. Sailaja
- 2022 – Bhagavatula Sethuram
- 2023 – Maddali Usha Gayatri

=== Manipuri ===
- 1956 – Maisnam Amubi Singh
- 1958 – Haobam Atomba Singh
- 1961 – T. Amudon Sharma
- 1963 – Atombapu Sharma
- 1965 – Guru Bipin Singh
- 1969 – Ojha Thangjam Chaoba Singh
- 1972 – Kshetri Tombi Devi
- 1973 – L. Koireng Singh
- 1974 – L. Ibemhal Devi
- 1975 – Rajani Maibi
- 1976 – Ojha Maibam Ibungohal Singh
- 1977 – Nayana Susheel Jhaveri
- 1980 – L. Thouranishabi Devi
- 1982 – L. Tombi Devi
- 1985 – Khaidem Lokeshwar Singh
- 1987 – Tarun Kumar Singh
- 1988 – Ibopishak Sharma
- 1990 – Th. Babu Singh
- 1993 – H. Ngangbi Devi
- 1994 – T. Nadia Singh
- 1995 – L. Thambalngoubi Devi
- 1996 – Darshana Jhaveri
- 1997 – Samanduram Tondon Devi
- 1998 – N. Madhabi Devi
- 1999–2000 – Sorokhaibam Naran Singh
- 2001 – Charu Sija Mathur
- 2002 – K. Ongbi Leipaklotpi Devi
- 2003 – Thiyam Suryamukhi Devi, Kalavati Devi
- 2005 – K. Radhamohon Sharma
- 2009 – L. Bino Devi
- 2010 – Phanjoubam Iboton Singh
- 2011 – Priti Patel
- 2014 – N. Amusana Devi
- 2016 – Maisnam Kaminikumar Singh
- 2017 – L.N. Oinam Ongdi Doni Devi
- 2018 – Akham Lakshmi Devi
- 2020 – Sruti Bandopadhay
- 2021 – Thokchom Ibemubi Devi
- 2022 – S. Noyonshakhi Devi
- 2023 – Latasana Devi

=== Mohiniattam ===
- 1972 – T. Chinnammu Amma
- 1978 – Kalamandalam Kalyanikutty Amma
- 1994 – Kalamandalam Satyabhama
- 1998 – Kalamandalam Kshemavathy
- 1999–2000 – Bharati Shivaji
- 2004 – Kalamandalam Sugandhi
- 2006 – Kalamandalam Vimala Menon
- 2007 – Deepti Omchery Bhalla
- 2008 – Kalamandalam Leelamma
- 2011 – V. K. Hymavathy
- 2015 – Mandakini Trivedi
- 2018 – Gopika Varma
- 2019 – Nirmala Paniker
- 2021 – Neena Prasad
- 2022 – Kala Vijayan
- 2023 – Pallavi Krishnan
- 2024 - Sreedevi Rajan

=== Odissi ===
- 1966 – Kelucharan Mohapatra
- 1970 – Pankaj Charan Das
- 1976 – Sanjukta Panigrahi (joint award with Raghunath Panigrahi for Odissi music)
- 1977 – Deba Prasad Das
- 1985 – Mayadhar Raut
- 1986 – Priyambada Mohanty Hejmadi
- 1987 – Sonal Mansingh
- 1992 – D. N. Pattnaik
- 1994 – Kumkum Mohanty
- 1995 – Raghunath Dutta
- 1997 – Gangadhar Pradhan
- 1999–2000 – Minati Mishra, Madhavi Mudgal
- 2002 – Kiran Segal
- 2003 – Hare Krishna Behera
- 2004 – Durllav Chandra Singh
- 2005 – Durga Charan Ranbir
- 2006 – Surendra Nath Jena
- 2007 – Ranjana Gauhar
- 2008 – Ramani Ranjan Jena
- 2009 – Geeta Mahalik
- 2010 – Aruna Mohanty
- 2011 – Ramli Ibrahim
- 2012 – Sharmila Biswas
- 2013 – Sangeeta Dash
- 2014 – Sudhakar Sahoo
- 2015 – Aloka Kanungo
- 2016 – Ratikant Mohapatra
- 2017 – Sujata Mohapatra
- 2018 – Surupa Sen
- 2019 – Sutapa Talukdar
- 2020 – Rabindra Atibudhi
- 2022 – Niranjan Rout
- 2023 – Snehaprava Samantaray

=== Sattriya ===
- 1963 – Maniram Datta Moktar
- 1978 – Bapuram Bayan Attai
- 1980 – Roseshwar Saikia Bayan Moktar
- 1996 – Indira P. P. Bora
- 1998 – Pradip Chaliha
- 1999–2000 – Parmanand Borbayan
- 2001 – Ghanakanta Bora
- 2004 – Jatin Goswami
- 2007 – Ganakanta Dutta Borbayan
- 2010 – Manik Borbayan
- 2013 – Jogen Dutta Bayan
- 2014 – Anita Sharma
- 2015 – Sarodi Saikia
- 2016 – Haricharan Bhuyan Borbayan
- 2017 – Ramkrishna Talukdar
- 2018 – Tankeswar Hazarika Borbayan
- 2019 – Ranjumoni Saikia
- 2022 – Gobinda Saikia
- 2023 – Bhaben Borbayan

=== Other major traditions of dance and dance theatre ===
- 2007 – Kalamandalam Sivan Namboodiri (Kutiyattam)
- 2009 – Kala Krishna (Andhranatyam)
- 2010 – Painkulam Rama Chakyar (Kutiyattam)
- 2012 – Painkulam Damodara Chakyar (Kutiyattam)
- 2013 – Srinivasa Rangachariar (Arayer Sevai)
- 2021 – Kalamandalam Girija (Kutiyattam)
- 2022 – Karuna Borah (Ankiya Bhaona)
- 2023 – Perini Prakash (Periniattam)

=== Music for dance ===
- 2005 – Josyula Krishna Murthy (Kuchipudi Bhagavatha Maddalla)
- 2006 – Kalamandalam Gangadharan (Kathakali Pattu)
- 2008 – Ramhari Das (Odissi)
- 2010 – S. Rajeswari (Bharatanatyam)
- 2011 – Karaikudi Krishnamurthi
- 2012 – Jwala Prasad
- 2013 – Dhaneshwar Swain
- 2014 – Varanasi Vishnu Namboothiri (Kathakali)
- 2015 – Rajkumar Bharathi
- 2017 – Ashit Desai
- 2020 – Prema Ramamurthy, Arambam Tombinou Devi
- 2021 – Bijay Kumar Jena
- 2022 – Pusthakam Ramaa
- 2023 – Kalinath Mishra

=== Folk and Tribal dance ===
- 2019 – Mukund Nayak

== Theatre ==
=== Acting ===
==== From 1952–2003 (language-wise) ====
===== Assamese =====
- 1961 – Mitradev Mahanta Adhikari
- 2001 – Girish Chowdhury
- 2019 - Pranjal Saikia

===== Bengali theatre =====
- 1958 – Ahindra Choudhury
- 1962 – Tripti Mitra
- 1967 – Sabitabrata Dutta
- 1970 – Saraju Bala Devi
- 1973 – Shobha Sen
- 1975 – Molina Devi
- 1977 – Krishna Roy
- 1983 – Kumar Roy
- 1989 – Sekhar Chatterjee
- 1995 – Satya Bandopadhyay
- 1998 – Soumitra Chatterjee
- 1999–2000 – Ketaki Dutta Sabitri Chatterjee
- 2003 – Shaoli Mitra

===== Gujarati theatre =====
- 1960 – Ashraf Khan
- 1965 – Muljibhai Khushalbhai Nayak
- 1968 – Jashwant Thaker
- 1974 – Pransukh Manilal Nayak
- 1980 – Dina Pathak (Gandhi)
- 1988 – Sarita Joshi

===== Hindi theatre =====
- 1979 – Amrish Puri
- 1982 – Manohar Singh
- 1984 – Uttara Baokar
- 1985 – Fida Hussain
- 1989 – Surekha Sikri
- 1990– Naseeruddin Shah (also Urdu)
- 1999–2000 – Seema Biswas

===== Kannada =====
- 1955 – Gubbi Veeranna
- 1961 – Subbaiah Naidu
- 1985 – B. Jayamma
- 1992 – R. Nagarathnamma
- 1994 – Balappa Yenagi
- 1996 – B. Jayashree
- 2003 – C. R. Simha

===== Malayalam =====
- 1960 – C. I. Parameswaran Pillai
- 1965 – V. T. Aravindaksha Menon
- 1969 – N. N. Pillai

===== Manipuri =====
- 1991 – Sabitri Heisnam
- 1997 – R. K. Bhogen

===== Marathi theatre =====
- 1955 – Narayan Rao Rajhans 'Bal Gandharva'
- 1956 – Ganesh Govind Bodas
- 1957 – Chintaman Ganesh Kolhatkar
- 1960 – Gopal Govind Pathak
- 1964 – Keshav Trimbak Date
- 1971 – Shreeram Lagoo
- 1976 – Jyotsna Bhole
- 1978 – Dattaram Walwaikar
- 1981 – Chintamani Govind Pendse
- 1983 – Dattatray Ramachandra Bhat
- 1986 – Prabhakar V. Panshikar
- 1987 – Sulabha Deshpande (also Hindi)
- 1988 – Saudagar Nagnath Gore 'Chhota Gandharva'
- 1990 – Bhakti Barve Inamdar
- 1991 – Neelu Phule
- 1996 – Mohan Agashe

===== Oriya =====
- 1961 – Samuel Sahu

===== Sanskrit =====
- 1965 – Krishnachandra Moreshwar "Daji Bhatawadekar"

===== Tamil =====
- 1959 – Pammal Sambandha Mudaliar
- 1962 – T. K. Shanmugam
- 1967 – S. V. Sahasranamam
- 1992 – Poornam Viswanathan

===== Telugu theatre =====
- 1961 – Sthanam Narasimha Rao
- 1963 – Banda Kanakalingeswara Rao
- 1973 – Kalyanam Raghuramaiah
- 1986 – Peesapati Narasimha Murty

===== Urdu =====
- 1963 – Zohra Sehgal
- 1994 – Uzra Butt

==== From 2004 onwards ====
- 2004 – Rohini Hattangady, Ramcharan Nirmalkar
- 2005 – Chindodi Leela
- 2006 – Dharani Barman, Gita Dey, K. Kaladharan Nair
- 2007 – Ramesh Mehta
- 2008 – Markand Bhatt, Arundhati Nag
- 2009 – Sudha Shivpuri, Neeta Mohindra
- 2010 – Dilip Prabhavalkar, Banwari Taneja, Maya Krishna Rao, Swatilekha Sengupta
- 2012 – Parvesh Seth, Nirmal Rishi, Purisai Kannappa Sambandan
- 2013 – Vasant Josalkar, Kusum Haidar
- 2014 – Debshankar Haldar, Ramdas Kamat
- 2017 – Anil Tickoo
- 2018 – Suhas Joshi, Teekam Joshi
- 2019 – Alok Chatterjee, Pranjal Saikia
- 2020 – Prashant Damle, Bhupesh Joshi, Amit Banerjee
- 2021 – Neeleshwar Mishra, Y. G. Mahendran
- 2022 – Ashok Saraf, Prem Lata Mishra
- 2023 – Anil Kumar Rastogi, Rajeev Verma

=== Mime ===
- 1993 – Jogesh Dutta
- 2002 – Niranjan Goswami
- 2009 – Moinul Haque
- 2018 – Swapan Nandy
- 2021 – Vilas Janve
- 2022 – Yumnam Sadananda Singh

=== Direction ===
- 1957 – Jaishankar Bhojak 'Sundari'
- 1959 – Sombhu Mitra
- 1961 – Kasambhai Nathubhai Mir
- 1962 – Ebrahim Alkazi
- 1964 – T. S. Rajamanikkam
- 1969 – Habib Tanvir
- 1970 – Adi Ferozeshah Marzban
- 1971 – Satyadev Dubey
- 1972 – Shyamanand Jalan
- 1973 – Ajitesh Bandopadhyay
- 1974 – Damodar Kashinath Kenkre
- 1975 – Vijaya Mehta
- 1976 – B. V. Karanth
- 1977 – Rajinder Nath
- 1978 – Jabbar Patel
- 1979 – B. M. Shah
- 1980 – Rudraprasad Sengupta
- 1981 – R. S. Manohar
- 1982 – Sheila Bhatia
- 1983 – Kavalam Narayana Panikkar
- 1985 – Heisnam Kanhailal
- 1986 – Alyque Padamsee
- 1987 – Tarun Roy
- 1987 – Ratan Thiyam
- 1989 – Bibhash Chakraborty
- 1990 – Geoffrey Kendal & Laura Kendal (Joint Award)
- 1991 – Fritz Bennewitz
- 1992 – Mohan Maharishi
- 1993 – Kailash Pandya
- 1993 – Barry John
- 1995 – M. K. Raina
- 1995 – Bansi Kaul
- 1996 – Purushottam Darwhekar
- 1997 – Bhanu Bharti
- 1998 – Amal Allana
- 1998 – Dulal Roy
- 1998 – Usha Ganguly
- 1999–2000 – Balwant Thakur
- 1999–2000 – Nadira Zaheer Babbar
- 1999–2000 – Prasanna
- 2001 – Shanta Gandhi
- 2002 – Arun Mukherjee, Satish Anand
- 2003 – Devendra Raj Ankur, Neelam Mansingh Chowdhry
- 2004 – Anuradha Kapur, Arambam Lokendra Singh, Raj Besaria
- 2005 – Ranjit Kapoor, V K Sharma
- 2006 – E. Joychandra Singh, R. Nagesh, Amitava Dasgupta
- 2007 – Hari Madhab Mukherjee, N.C. Thakur
- 2008 – S. Ramanujam, Probir Guha
- 2009 – Joy Michael, Dinesh Thakur
- 2010 – Veenapani Chawla, Urmil Kumar Thapliyal
- 2011 – Alakhnandan, Kirti Jain
- 2012 – Tripurari Sharma, Waman Kendre
- 2013 – Kamalkar Muralidhar Sontakke, Kewal Dhaliwal, Prasanna Ramaswamy
- 2014 – Surya Mohan Kulshreshtha, Chidambar Rao Jambe
- 2015 – Parvez Akhtar, Mushtaq Kak
- 2016 – Satyabrata Rout, Rajkamal Nayak
- 2018 – Sanjay Upadhyay, S. Raghunandana
- 2019 – Bharti Sharma, Kumar Sohoni, Abinash Sarma
- 2020 – Lokendra Trivedi, Mithilesh Rai
- 2021 – R. Venugopal Rao (Surabhi), Lalit Singh Pokharia, Sudesh Sharma, Ajay Malkani, Manoj Pattnaik
- 2022 – Gunakar Dev Goswami, Suresh Sharma, Susairaj A
- 2023 – Surinder Sharma, Zahoor Alam

=== Playwriting ===
- Assamese
  - 1986 – Satya Prasad Barua
  - 2003 – Aruna Sarma
- Bengali
  - 1968 – Badal Sircar
  - 1969 – Manmatha Ray
  - 1975 – Bijon Bhattacharya
  - 1985 – Manoj Mitra
  - 1991 – Mohit Chattopadhyaya
- Dogri
  - 2008 – Narsingh Dev Jamwal
- Gujarati
  - 1961 – Prabhulal Dayaram Dwivedi
  - 1971 – C. C. Mehta, Pragji Dossa
- Hindi
  - 1965 – Upendra Nath Ashk
  - 1968 – Mohan Rakesh
  - 1977 – Lakshmi Narain Lal
  - 1988 – Dharamvir Bharati
  - 1992 – Surendra Verma
  - 2001 – Bhisham Sahni, D.P. Sinha
  - 2006 – Prabhat Kumar Bhattacharya
  - 2004 – Swadesh Deepak
  - 2007 – Reoti Sharan Sharna
  - 2008 – Mudra Rakshasa
- Kannada
  - 1963 – Adya Rangacharya 'Shriranga'
  - 1972 – Girish Karnad
  - 1983 – Chandrashekhara Kambara
  - 1980 – Narasinga Rao Parwathavani
  - 1989 – G. B. Joshi
  - 1997 – H. S. Shivaprakash
- Kashmiri
  - 1997 – Moti Lal Kemmu
- Malayalam
  - 1979 – G. Sankara Pillai
  - 1983 – Kavalam Narayana Panikkar
  - 1986 – K. T. Muhammed
  - 1997 – N. Krishna Pillai
  - 2009 – Vayala Vasudevan Pillai
- Manipuri
  - 2007 – Yumnam Rajendra Singh
- Marathi
  - 1958 – B.V. 'Mama' Warerkar
  - 1967 – P. L. Deshpande
  - 1970 – Vijay Tendulkar
  - 1976 – C. T. Khanolkar
  - 1982 – M.G. Rangnekar
  - 1984 – Vasant Shankar Kanetkar
  - 1987 – V.V. Shirwadkar
  - 1989 – Mahesh Elkunchwar
  - 1994 – Satish Alekar
  - 1996 – G.P. Deshpande
  - 2003 – Ratnakar Ramkrishna Matkari
  - 2009 – Shankar Narayan Navre
  - 2017 – Abhiram Bhadkamkar
- Mizo
  - 2007 – Lathangfala Sailo
- Oriya
  - 1981 – Manoranjan Das
  - 1982 – Biswajit Das
  - 1987 – Gopal Chhotray
- Punjabi
  - 1993 – Gursharan Singh
  - 1998 – Balwant Gargi
  - 2010 – Atamjeet Singh
- Tamil
  - 1974 – S.D. Sundaram
  - 1999–2000 – Na. Muthuswamy
  - 2004 – Indira Parthasarathy
- Telugu
  - 2010 – D. Vizai Bhaskar

==== 2012 onwards ====
- 2012 – Arjun Deo Charan
- 2013 – Rameshwar Prem, Pundalik Narayan Naik
- 2014 – Asgar Wajahat
- 2018 – Rajiv Naik, Laltluangliana Khiangte
- 2019 – Hrishikesh Sulabh
- 2022 – Sohan Lal Kaul
- 2023 – Asif Ali Haider Khan, Pali Bhupinder Singh

=== Allied Theatre Arts ===
- Lighting
  - 1974 – Tapas Sen
  - 1977 – V, Ramamurthy
  - 1989 – G.N. Dasgupta
  - 1994 – Kanishka Sen
  - 1997 – Mansukh Joshi (for scenic design also)
  - 1999–2000 – R.K. Dhingra
  - 2002 – Ashok Sagar Bhagat
  - 2003 – Sreenivas G. Kappanna
  - 2005 – Suresh Bhardwaj
  - 2006 - Gautam Bhattacharya
  - 2011 – Kamal Jain
  - 2019 – Souti Chakraborty
  - 2020 – Raghav Prakash
  - 2022 – Daulat Ram Vaid
  - 2023 – Anoop Joshi, Sandeep Dutta
- Scenic Design
  - 1985 – Goverdhan Panchal
  - 1986 – Khaled Choudhury
  - 1988 – Dattatraya Ganesh Godse
  - 1997 – Mansukh Joshi
  - 1999–2000 – Robin Das
  - 2007 – Mahendra Kumar
- Costumes/Make-up
  - 1981 – Ashok Srivastava (Make-up)
  - 1990 – Roshan Alkazi (Costume Design)
  - 1999–2000 – Shakti Sen (Make-up)
  - 2001 – Dolly Ahluwalia (Costume Design)
  - 2003 – Anant Gopal Shinde (Make-up)
  - 2004 – Prema Karanth (Costume Design)
  - 2008 – Amba Sanyal (Costume Designing)
  - 2009 – Kamal Arora (Make-up)
  - 2013 – Krishna Borkar (Make-up)
  - 2019 – N.K. Ramakrishna (Make-up)
  - 2020 – M. Purushottam (Costume Design)
- Music for Theatre
  - 1999–2000 – Kajal Ghosh, Kamal Tewari
  - 2005 - R. Paramashivan
  - 2009 – Kuldeep Singh
  - 2012 - Murari Roychoudhury
  - 2014 - Amod Bhatt, Amardas Manikpuri (Chhattisgarh)
- Stagecraft
  - 1993 – M.S. Sathyu
  - 1995 – N. Krishnamoorthy
  - 2002 – Nissar Allana
  - 2005 – H. V. Sharma
  - 2020 – N. Jadumani Singh

=== Major traditions of theatre ===
- 2007 – Kolyur Ramachandra Rao (Yakshagana)
- 2008 – Bansi Lal Khiladi, Khayal (Rajasthan)
- 2012 – Ghulam Rasool Bhagat (Bhand Pather)
- 2014 – Manjunath Bhagwat Hostota (Yakshagana)
- 2015 – Sarojini Nangiaramma (Koodiyattam)
- 2018 – Bhagawat A. S. Nanjappa (Yakshagana), A. M. Parameswaran Kuttan Chakkiyar (Kutiyattam)
- 2019 – K. S. Krishanappa (Isai Natakam)
- 2020 – P. P. Kandaswami (Therukoothu)
- 2021 – Gunindra Nath Ojah (Music and Direction in Ankiya Bhaona)
- 2022 – Margi Madhu Chakyar (Kutiyattam)
- 2023 – Piyal Bhattacharya (Sanskrit Theatre)

=== Other Traditional/ Folk/ Tribal/ Dance/ Music/ Theatre and Puppetry ===
- 1964 – Mani Madhava Chakyar (Kutiyattam), Kerala
- 1969 – Gahan Chandra Goswami (Ankia Nat, Assam)
- 1972 – Kudamaloor Karunakaran Nair (Kathakali), Kerala
- 1976 – Raghunath Panigrahi (Joint Award with Sanjukta Panigrahi for Odissi Music, Orissa)
- 1981 – Kamini Kumar Narzary (Bodo Tribal Dance, Assam)
- 1983 – Dharmiklal Chunilal Pandya (Akhyana), Gujarat
- 1983 – Lalit Chandra Ojha (Ojapali and Deodhani Dances, Assam)
- 1984 – Balakrushna Dash (Odissi Music, Orissa)
- 1985 – Mohan Chandra Barman (Bhaona, Assam)
- 1984 – Bhubaneswar Mishra (Odissi Music, Orissa)
- 1987 – Bhupen Hazarika (Folk Music, Assam)
- 1988 – Pratima Barua Pandey (Folk Music, Assam)
- 1989 – Rajen Pam (Tribal Music, Assam)
- 1990 – Rameshwar Pathak (Folk Music, Assam)
- 1991 – Puranchand Wadali & Pyarelal Wadali (Folk Music), Punjab
- 1992 – Khagen Mahanta (Folk Music, Assam)
- 1994 – M. Boyer (Tiatr), Goa
- 1995 – Teejan Bai (Pandavani), Madhya Pradesh
- 1997 – Arghya sen [(Rabindra Sangeet), West Bengal
- 1997 – P. R. Thilagam, Kuravanji performer, Tamil Nadu
- 1998 – Ghulam Mohammad Saznawaz, Jammu and Kashmir
- 2002 – Dilip Sarma & Sudakshina Sarma (Jyoti Sangeet, Assam - Joint Award)
- 2003 – Prabhat Sarma (traditional & Folk Music, Assam)
- 2003 – Kosha Kanta Deva Goswami (Mask Making Bhaona, Assam)
- 2003 – Banamali Maharana (Odissi Music, Orissa)
- 2005 – Khirod Khakhlari (Bodo Dance & Music, Assam)
- 2005 – Kashinath Pujapanda (Odissi Music, Orissa)
- 2005 – Mathoor Govindan Kutty (Kathakali), Kerala
- 2007 – Subodh Debbarma (Folk dance), Tripura
- 2007 – Amar Pal (Folk Song), West Bengal
- 2008 – Kartar Singh (Gurbani), Punjab
- 2008 – Mangi Bai Arya (Mand), Rajasthan
- 2008 – Lakha Khan Mangniyar, (Folk Music), Rajasthan
- 2008 – Bansi Lal Khilari (Khayal), Rajasthan
- 2009 – Bhikhudan Gadhvi (Folk music), Gujarat
- 2010 – Harbhajan Singh Namdhari (Gurbani Kirtan), Punjab
- 2010 – Nazeer Ahmed Khan Warsi and Naseer Ahmed Khan Warsi (Qawwali), Andhra Pradesh
- 2010 – Dwijen Mukherjee (Rabindra Sangeet), West Bengal
- 2010 – Chandabai Tiwadi (Bharud), Maharashtra
- 2010 – T. Somasundaram (Folk dance), Tamil Nadu
- 2010 – Krishna Kumari (Folk music: Bhakha), Jammu and Kashmir
- 2010 – Chand Jagdish Tiwadi (Folk theatre: Bharud), Maharashtra
- 2011 – Thrippekulam Achuta Marar, Kerala
- 2011 – Hemant Chauhan (Folk Music), Gujarat
- 2011 – Gurmeet Bawa (Folk Music), Punjab
- 2011 – Kashiram Sahu (Folk Theatre), Chhattisgarh
- 2011 – Mipham Otsal (Traditional Theatre), Jammu & Kashmir
- 2011 – Bellagallu Veeranna (Togalu Gombeyatta, Puppetry), Karnataka
- 2011 – Gopal Chandra Das (Putul Nach), Tripura
- 2011 – Kasmi Khan Niyazi (Making of musical Instrument), DeIhi
- 2012 – Go Ru Channabasappa (Folk Music - Karnataka)
- 2012 – Kinaram Nath Oja (Suknani Ojapali - Assam)
- 2012 – Prem Singh Dehati (Folk Music - Haryana)
- 2012 – Sulochana Chavan (Lavani - Maharashtra)
- 2012 – Mattannur Sankaran Kutty Marar (Thayambaka - Kerala)
- 2012 – Govind Ram Nirmalkar (Nacha - Chhattisgarh)
- 2012 – Heera Das Negi (Mask Making - Himachal Pradesh)
- 2013 – Meeenakshi K. (Instrument Making - Ghatam - Tamil Nadu)
- 2013 – Raj Begum, Traditional, Folk Music/Dance & Theatre (Jammu & Kashmir)
- 2013 – T.A.R. Nadi Rao & N Jeeva Rao (Joint Award), Folk Music (Tamil Nadu)
- 2013 – Gurdial Singh, Instrument Making (Punjab)
- 2013 – Mohan Singh Khangura, Rabindra Sangeet (West Bengal)
- 2013 – Umakanta Gogoi (Bairagi), Tokari Geet and Dehbichar Geet, (Assam)
- 2013 – Sheikh Riyajuddin alias Rajubaba, Folk Theatre (Maharashtra)
- 2014 – Puran Shah Koti (Traditional Music - Punjab)
- 2014 – Kalamandalam Ram Mohan (Makeup/Costume for Kathakali)
- 2014 – Reba Kanta Mohanta (Mask Making - Assam)
- 2014 – Abdul Rashid Hafiz (Folk Music - Jammu & Kashmir )
- 2014 – K.Shanathoiba Sharma (Thang-Ta - Manipur)
- 2014 – Ramdayal Sharma (Nautanki - U.P.)
- 2014 – Thanga Darlong (Folk Music - Tripura)
- 2015 - K. K. Ramachandra Pulavar (Tholpavakoothu)
- 2015 – Ramchandra Singh (Folk Theater - Bihar)
- 2017 – Mukund Nayak (Folk Music - Jharkhand)
- 2017 – Prakash Khandge (Folk Arts - Maharashtra)
- 2018 – Malini Awasthi (Folk Music - Uttar Pradesh)
- 2018 – Gazi Khan Barna (Folk Music - Khartal, Rajasthan)
- 2018 – Narendra Singh Negi (Folk Songs - Uttarakhand)
- 2018 – Niranjan Rajyaguru (Folk Music - Gujarat)
- 2018 – Mohd. Sadiq Bhagat (Folk Theatre - Bhand Pather, J&K)
- 2018 – Kota Sachidanand Shastry (Harikatha - Andhra Pradesh)
- 2018 – Arjun Singh Dhurve (Folk Dance - Madhya Pradesh)
- 2018 – Somnath Battu (Folk Music - Himachal Pradesh)
- 2018 – Hem Chandra Goswami (Mask Making - Assam)
- 2019 – Mamta Chandrakar (Folk Music Chhattisgarh)
- 2019 – Ram Lal (Folk Music, Uttarakhand)
- 2019 – Shankarbhai Hakabhai Dharjiya (Folk Music & Dance - Gujarat)
- 2019 – Nathulal Solanki (Folk Music - Rajasthan)
- 2019 – Pandurang Ghotkar (Folk Music - Maharashtra)
- 2019 – Peruvanam Kuttan Marar (Thayambaka - Kerala)
- 2019 – Urmila Pandey (Folk Music - Madhya Pradesh)
- 2019 – Sayed Mohmmed P.P. (Folk Music & Dance - Lakshadweep)
- 2019 – Majid Gulabsaheb Sitarmaker (Instrument Making - Maharashtra)
- 2019 – Dulal Kanji (Instrument Making - West Bengal)
- 2020 – Balkar Sidhu (Folk Dance - Punjab)
- 2020 – Nandlal Garg (Folk Music - Himachal Pradesh)
- 2020 – B. Lalthlengliana (Folk Theatre - Mizoram)
- 2020 – Ranjana Kumri Jha (Folk Music - Bihar)
- 2020 – S. G. Lakshmidevamma (Folk Music - Karnataka)
- 2020 – Tarubala Debbarma (Folk Music and Dance - Tripura)
- 2020 – Sang Jangmu (Folk Dance - Arunachal Pradesh)
- 2020 – Gafoor Khan Manganiar (Folk Music - Rajasthan)
- 2020 – Zachunu Keyho (Folk Music - Nagaland)
- 2021 – Silbi Passah (Folk Music - Meghalaya)
- 2021 – Durga Prasad Murmu (Folk Music and Dance - Jharkhand)
- 2021 – Prashanna Gogoi (Folk Music & Dance - Assam)
- 2021 – Gartigere Raghanna (H. N Raghavenda) (Folk Music - Karnataka)
- 2021 – S Samundaram (Folk Music - Tamil Nadu)
- 2021 – Data Ram Purohit (Folk Music & Theatre - Uttarakhand)
- 2021 – Mahavir Singh Guddu (Folk Music & Dance - Haryana)
- 2021 – N Tiken Singh (Folk Music - Manipur)
- 2021 – N. Sekar (Folk Music - Puducherry)
- 2021 – R. Murugan (Instrument Making - Tamil Nadu)
- 2022 – Shailesh Shrivastava (Folk Music - Uttar Pradesh)
- 2022 – Vijay Shamrao Chavan (Folk Music - Dholak, Maharashtra)
- 2022 – Tsering Jorgais (Folk Music - Ladakh)
- 2022 – Olen Megu Damin (Folk &Traditional Music & Dance - Arunachal Pradesh)
- 2022 – Nitu Kumari Nootan (Folk Music - Bihar)
- 2022 – Gaffruddin Mewati Jogi (Folk/Traditional Music – Bhapang, Rajasthan)
- 2022 – Tarawati Bori (Folk /Traditional Music - Assam)
- 2022 – K. Vishwanatha Pulavar (Puppetry - Tholpavakoothu)
- 2022 – Mahendrakumar Karsandas Andani (Folk Dance - Gujarat)
- 2022 – Chingtham Ranjeet Khuman (Thang Ta - Manipur)
- 2022 – Poonam Tivari (Folk Music - Chhattisgarh)
- 2023 – Kanta Kashinath Gaude (Folk Music, Goa)
- 2023 – Swapan Mukhopadhyay (Folk Music, West Bengal)
- 2023 – Rakesh Bhatt (Folk Theatre/Music, Uttarakhand)
- 2023 – Krishna Lal Sehgal (Folk Song- Himachal Pradesh)
- 2023 – Bharat Sharma Vyas (Folk Music, Bihar)
- 2023 – Helen Giri Syiem (Folk & traditional Music, Meghalaya)
- 2023 – Cheruthazham Kunhiraman Marar (Traditional Music - Chenda, Kerala)
- 2023 – Abdul Gaffar Das Kanihami (Folk Music, Jammu & Kashmir)
- 2023 – Jayantibhai Maganbhai Sharma (Instrument Making, Gujarat)
- 2023 – K. Pajanivel (Martial Arts, Puducherry)
- 2023 – Gurpreet Singh Khalsa (Martial Arts, Punjab)

=== Puppetry/ Mime/ Allied arts of traditional forms ===
- 1978 – Kathinanada Das (Ravanchhaya puppetry), Orissa
- 1979 – U. Kogga Devanna Kamath (Gombeatta puppetry), Karnataka
- 1980 – K.L. Krishnan Kutty Pulavar (Tholpava Koothu), Kerala
- 1981 – M.R. Ranganatha Rao, Karnataka
- 1983 – Meher Rustom Contractor, Gujarat
- 1987 – Suresh Dutta, West Bengal
- 1992 – Dadi Dorab Pudumjee, Delhi
- 1995 – T. Hombiah, Karnataka
- 1998 – Kolhacharan Sahu (Ravanchhaya puppetry), Orissa
- 1999 – B.H. Puttashamachar, Karanataka
- 2001 – Hiren Bhattacharya, Assam
- 2003 – Puran Bhatt, Rajasthan
- 2004 – Maguni Charan Kuanr, Odisha
- 2005 – Ganpat Sakharam Masge, Maharashtra
- 2010 – K. Chinna Anjannamma (Shadow puppetry: Tolu Bommalata), Andhra Pradesh
- 2010 – K.V. Ramakrishnan and K.C. Ramakrishnan (Glove puppetry: Pava Kathakali), Kerala
- 2012 – Prafulla Karmakar (Traditional Puppetry - West Bengal)
- 2013 – Lilavati M Kavi (Bajaj), Puppetry
- 2014 – K. Kesavasamy (Puppetry - Puducherry)
- 2016 – Prabhitangsu Das (Contemporary Puppetry - Tripura)
- 2018 – Anupama Hoskere (Classical String Puppetry of Karnataka, Bengaluru)
- 2020 – Meena Naik (Puppetry - Maharashtra)

== Films ==
Key
# Indicates an award for the performing arts in the media

List of recipients, showing the year and field
Year	Recipient	Field
1957	Debaki Bose	Direction
1957	Gajanan Digambar Madgulkar	Screenplay
1958	Sachin Dev Burman	Music Direction
1958	Durga Khote	Acting
1959	Ashok Kumar	Acting
1959	Satyajit Ray	Direction
1960	Chhabi Biswas	Acting
1961	Lalita Pawar	Acting
1961	Kavi Pradeep	Lyricist
1961	Mukhram Sharma	Screenplay
1988	Salil Chowdhury#	Music
1992	Naushad#	Music
1992	K. J. Yesudas#	Music
2001	Prem Matiyani#	Theatre

== Overall Contribution/Scholarship ==
List of recipients, showing the year and field
Year	Recipient	Field
1991	Sudhir Phadke	Performing Arts
1994	Kanak Rele	Dance
1994	K. V. Subbanna	Theatre
1995	Sunil Kothari	Dance
1996	Ram Gopal Bajaj	Theatre
2000	B. V. K. Sastry	Performing Arts
2000	Nemi Chandra Jain	Performing Arts
2000	Shanta Serbjeet Singh	Performing Arts
2001	Suresh Awasthi	Performing Arts
2002	Romesh Chander	Theatre
2002	J. N. Kaushal	Theatre
2003	P. V. Subramanium 'Subbudu'	Performing Arts
2004	Sushil Kumar Saxena	Performing Arts
2005	Pratibha Agrawal	Theatre
2006	Rekha Jain	Performing Arts
2007	Mukund Lath	Performing Arts
2008	R. Sathyanarayana	Performing Arts
2009	Leela Venkataraman	Performing Arts
2010	Ashok Ranade	Music
2010	Jaidev Taneja	Theatre
2011	Shrivatsa Goswami	
2011	Sundari K. Shridharani	
2012	Arun Kakade	
2012	Nandini Ramani	
2013	N. Ramanathan	
2013	Mysore V. Subramanya	
2014	Indudhar Nirody	
2014	Akshara K. V.	
2015	Chaman Lal Ahuja	Performing Arts
2015	Shanta Gokhale	Performing Arts
2015	Rani Balbir Kaur	Theatre
2016	Avinash Pasricha	Performing Arts
2017	Sandhya Purecha	Dance
2018	Diwan Singh Bajeli	Theatre
2018	Puru Dadheech	Dance
2019	Utpal K. Banerjee	
2019	Ritha Rajan	
2020	Mahesh Champaklal	Theatre
2020	Nandkishore Kapote	Dance
2021	Vibha Dadheech	Dance
2021	Premchand Hombal	Dance
2022	Lakshahira Das	Performing Arts
2022	Prameela Gurumurthy	Performing Arts
2023	G. Venu	Performing Arts
2023	Jagdish Trivedi	Performing Arts
