= Anil Tickoo =

Stage director

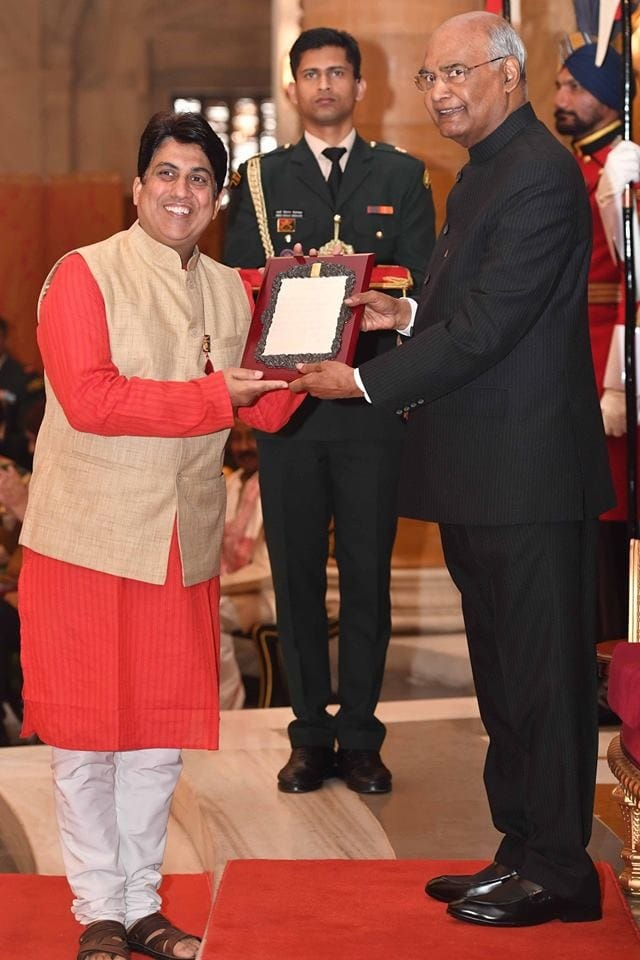
- Born: 28 June 1970 (age 56); Jammu, Jammu and Kashmir, India
- Education: Theatre and television
- Occupations: Actor, director

Anil Tickoo is a stage actor in the Dogri and Hindi language, and a prominent figure in Jammu and Kashmir Theatre.

== Awards ==
He has won numerous National awards in his career, including the prestigious Sangeet Natak Akademi Award for the year 2017 in Acting. He is the first actor from Jammu & Kashmir who has been honored with this highest honor of the country in the field of performing arts.

On the occasion of Republic Day 2026,Anil Tickoo was conferred with the Jammu and Kashmir Government Award in recognition of his outstanding contribution to the field of Theatre.

== Contribution to theatre ==
Anil has also acted in more than 200 stage plays. Prominent among them included film Ghulab Gatha, plays Bawa Jitto, Mahabhoj, Ghumayee, Bhoma, Ghera, Comedy of Terrors, Suno Eh Kahani, Kanjoos, Fandi, Holi, Poster, Aap Hamare Hain Kaun, Rakt-Beej, Kowva Chala Hans Ki Chaal, Bichoo, Kabira Khada bazaar Mein, Allar Goli Veer Sipahi, Tax Free, Rishta and Sainyan Bhaye Kotwal.

== Career ==
Considered as one of the most celebrated actor of Indian theatre, Anil Tickoo has the credit of having participated over 150 national and international theatre festivals including Frankfurt International Theatre Festival, Frankfurt (Germany), Days of India in Russia and National Day Celebrations of Bhutan. Over the last twenty–nine years he has continuously worked in the field of theatre as actor and had been a part of projects like Theatre for Mass Motivation and the Theatre for Population education supported by UNESCO and UNICEF. He is also one of the leading instructors of Natrang Children's Weekend Club. In recognition to his contribution as an innovative actor, he received the junior fellowship from the Department of Culture, Govt. of India.

Anil has directed over twenty plays for Natrang including Baba Ki Jai Ho, Damaad, Panja, Natak Nahein, Khel Ghar, Refund, Chehre, Salvaton Mein Sanwaad, Baje Dhindhora, Kya Yeh Sach Hai and Tankara Ka Gaana. His directorial works were much appreciated for scenic design and creative lighting. He has been associated with Jammu and Kashmir Academy of Art, Culture and Languages for the last two decades and led many cultural delegations to other states of India to represent Art and Culture of J&K.

== See also ==
- Dogri
- Balwant Thakur
- Moti Lal Kemmu
