= Kalamandalam Rajan =

Indian Kathakali exponent

- Born: 1931; Ezhikkara, North Paravur, British India
- Died: 14 June 2012 (aged 81); Thrippunithura, Ernakulam district
- Occupation: Kathakali exponent
- Spouse: Sulochana
- Children: 1
- Parent(s): Sreedhara Panikar, Kochukuttiamma
- Awards: Sangeet Natak Akademi Award, Kerala Kalamandalam award, Kerala Sangeetha Nataka Akademi Gurupooja award

Kalamandalam Rajan was a Kathakali exponent from Kerala, India. He has received the Sangeet Natak Akademi Award 2009, Kerala Sangeetha Nataka Akademi Gurupooja award 2006.

== Biography ==
Kalamandalam Rajan was born in 1931 at Ezhikkara, North Paravur in Ernakulam district of Kerala to Sreedhara Panikar of Nellipuzha house in Aroor and Kochukuttyamma of Ezhikkara Kadakkara Erappath house. After school, he studied and paracticed dance. During this period, he saw Kalamandalam Krishnan Nair Ashan performing Poothanamoksham Kathakali. Seeing that performance, Rajan decided to learn Kathakali. He joined Kerala Kalamandalam in 1955 and studied kathakali under noted kathakali artists like Kalamandalam Padmanabhan Nair, Kalamandalam Ramankutty Nair, Keezhpadam Kumaran Nair and Vazhenkada Kunchu Nair. in 1965 he joined Tripunithura RLV college as an assistant dance master in kathakali and retired from there as head of the Fine Arts Section. In 1985 he was re-appointed as visiting Professor in the same institution.

In Kathakali Rajan was expert in pacha, kathi and minukku roles. His performances as Bahuka, Nala and Dharmaputra have been critically acclaimed. He had performed in many stages India and abroad with Margi Kathakali Vidyalayam, Thiruvananthapuram, and was part of the Kathakali Festival conducted by Sangeet Natak Akademi in New Delhi in 1993.

He died on 14 June 2012, at the age of 81 at his house in Thrippunithura, Ernakulam district.

== Family ==
He and his wife Sulochana had one daughter.

== Awards and honors ==
- Sangeet Natak Akademi Award 2009
- Kerala Sangeetha Nataka Akademi Gurupooja award 2006
- Kalamandalam Krishnan Nair Memorial Award 2001
- Kalamandalam Karunakaran Smaraka Award 2007
- Pattikkamthodi Ravunni Menon Memorial Kathakali Award bestowed by Kerala Kalamandalam 2008
