= Kottakkal Nandakumaran Nair =

Indian Kathakali exponent (born 1948)

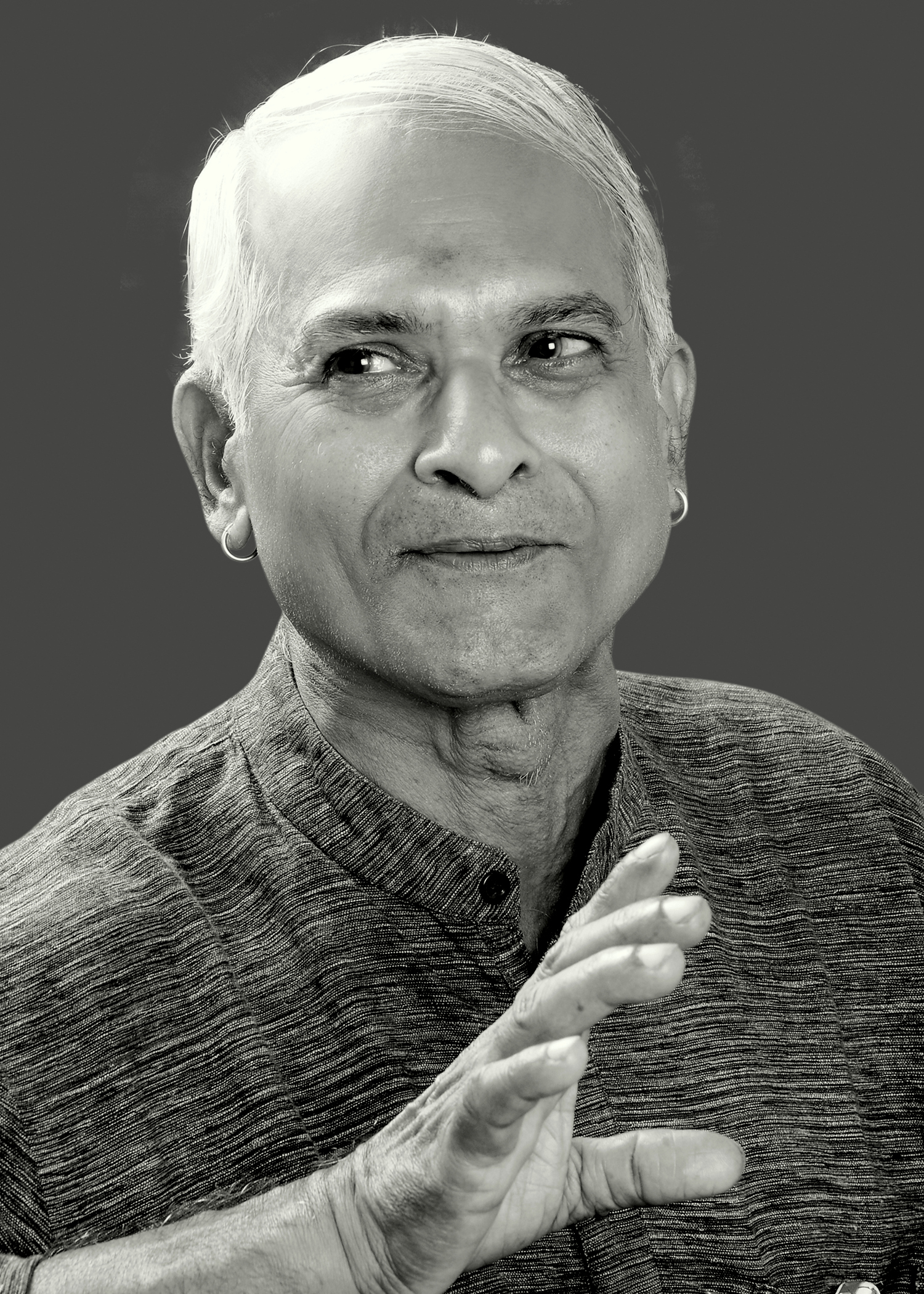
- Born: 17 August 1948 (age 78); Desamangalam, Cochin kingdom, British Raj
- Occupation: Kathakali exponent
- Awards: Sangeet Natak Akademi Award (2019); Kerala Kalamandalam Award (2016); Kerala Sangeetha Nataka Akademi Award (2009)
- Website: Official website

Kottakkal Nandakumaran Nair is an Indian Kathakali actor and teacher from Kerala. He received the Kerala Sangeetha Nataka Akademi Award in 2009, the Kerala Kalamandalam Award in 2016 and the Sangeet Natak Akademi Award for the year 2019.

== Biography ==
Kottakkal Nandakumaran Nair was born in 1948 at Desamangalam in present-day Thrissur district of Kerala. He learnt Ottan Thullal under Kalamandalam Divakaran Nair and Malabar Kannan Nair at the Kerala Kalamandalam in the early 1960s. After completing his Ottan Thullal studies at Kalamandalam, he wanted to study Kathakali at the Kalamandalam itself, but authorities rejected his re-admission due to technical issues. Hearing this, Vasu Pisharody, then a senior student of Kathakali at Kalamandalam, advised him to go to P.S.V. Natyasanghom in Kottakkal, and meet Guru Kottakkal Krishnankutty Nair. Carrying a letter from Vazhenkada Kunju Nair, he met Krishnankutty Nair and joined P.S.V. Natya Sangam. He studied Kathakali under Krishnankutty for 16 years.

=== Personal life ===
His daughter, Athira Nandan, who is also a Kathakali artist, studied Kathakali for ten years under her father. He currently lives in Chuduvalathur in Shoranur in Palakkad district of Kerala.

== Career ==
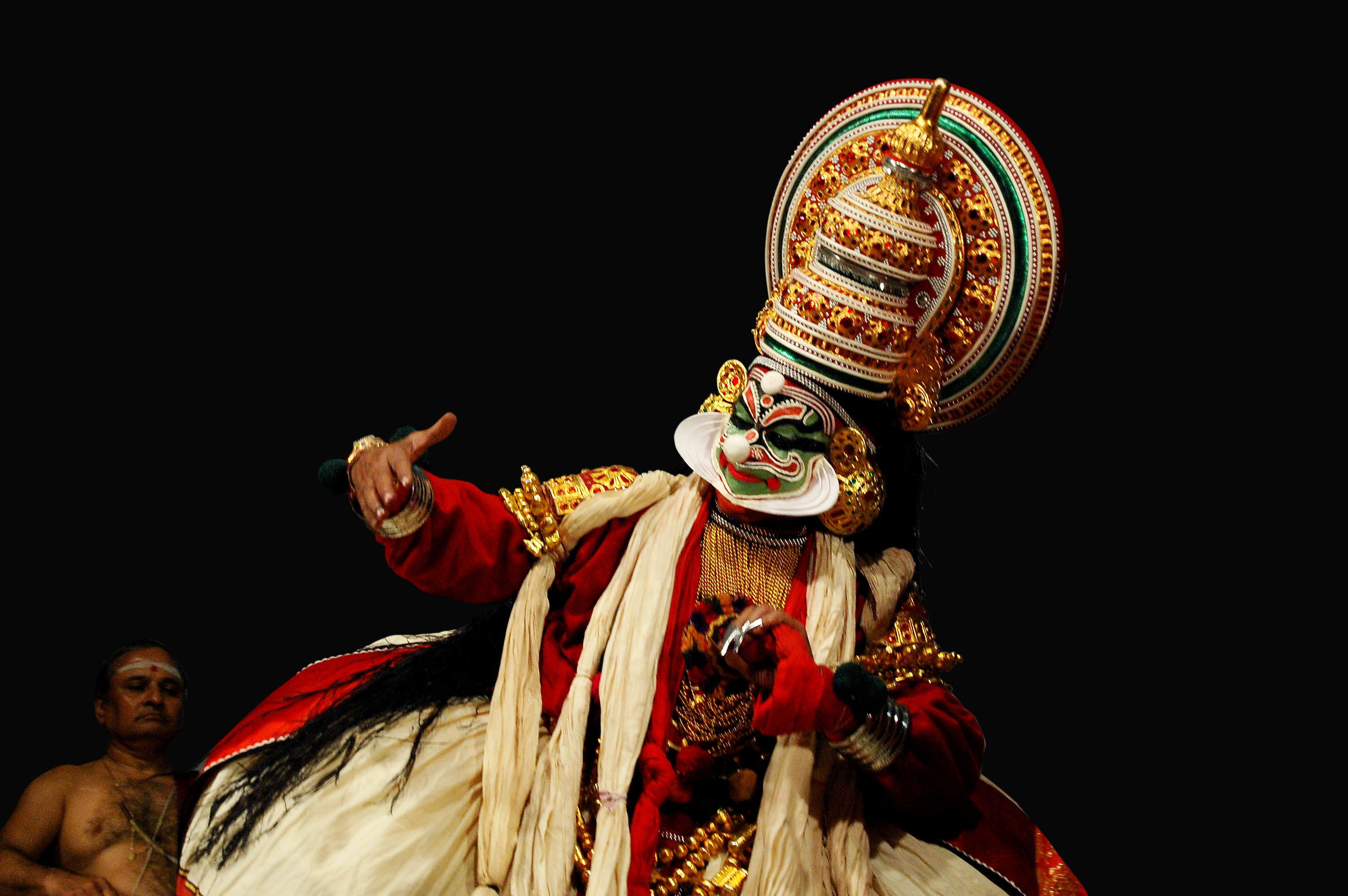
Kottakkal Nandakumaran Nair Performing kathakali

Nandakumaran Nair, who has also played the roles of 'Pacha', 'Vellathadi' and 'Minukku', is notable for his roles in 'Kathi'. He has performed in many venues within the country and abroad including the Kathakali Festival organized by the Sangeet Natak Akademi, the Paris Theatre Festival, Gothenburg Theatre Festival, Ramayana Festival Indonesia, Shakespearean Festival, Traditional Festival Brazil, and International Theatre Festival of Kerala. Apart from India, Nandakumaran Nair has performed Kathakali in countries such as Poland, France, Germany, Italy, Portugal, Sweden, Brazil, China, Korea, Indonesia, Malaysia, Singapore, Russia, Arab countries, the Netherlands, and Spain. Nair has also conducted workshops and demonstrations in Kathakali at several events abroad such as Warsaw Theatre Academy, Poland.

Apart from performance, Nandakumaran Nair has also written Aattakkathas and choreographed for Kathakali and presented them at many venues including the World Theatre International Seminar at Odylo Costa Filho Theatre University in Brazil. 'Madhuradahanam' is a Kathakali production by him based on Malayalam translation of Cilappatikaram written by poet S. Ramesan Nair.

Nandakumaran Nair is an Empanelled artist in Kathakali in Indian Council for Cultural Relations since 2003.

== Awards and honours ==
In the field of Kathakali, Nandakumaran Nair received many awards and honours including Kerala Sangeetha Nataka Akademi Award in 2009, the Kerala Kalamandalam Award in 2016 and the Sangeet Natak Akademi Award for the year 2019.
