= Balbir =

Balbir is an Indian name.

- Balbir Singh (disambiguation) is a common name among the Punjabi Sikhs.

Other notable people named Balbir include:

- Nalini Balbir (born 1955), French Indologist
- Balbir Prasad Chaudhary, member of the 2nd Nepalese Constituent Assembly
- Balbir Dutt, Indian journalist
- Rani Balbir Kaur, Punjabi theater personality
- Balbir Madhopuri, Punjabi language writer, poet and translator
- Balbir Punj, Indian journalist and columnist

== See also ==
- Balbi
