= Annavarapu Rama Swamy =

Indian classical violinist

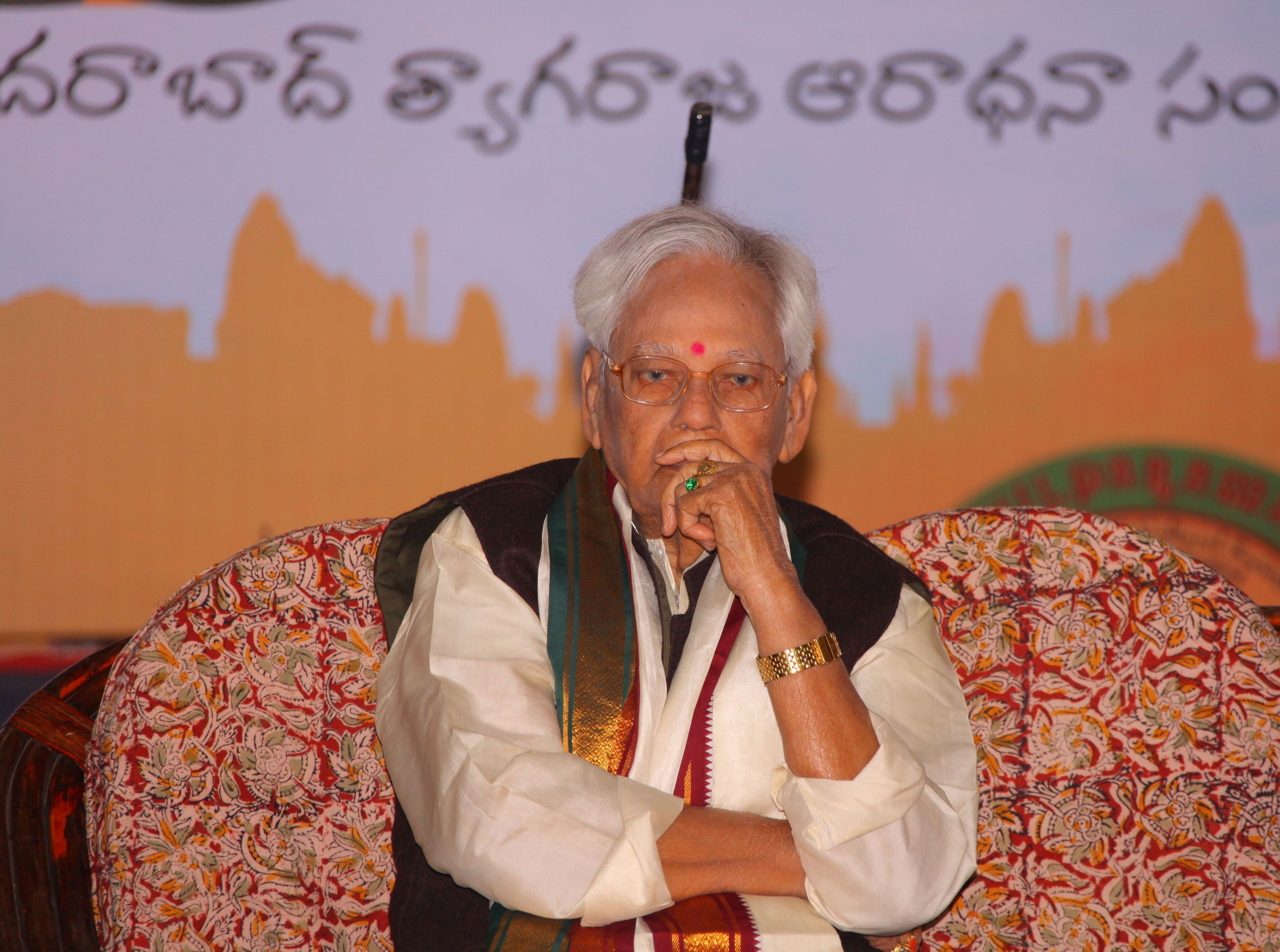

Background information
- Also known as: Annavarapu
- Born: 23 March 1926 (age 100); Eluru, Somavarappadu, Andhra Pradesh, India
- Occupations: Musician
- Instruments: Violin
- Awards: Padma Shri (2021)

Annavarapu Rama Swamy (born 23 March 1926) is an Indian classical violinist from Andhra Pradesh, India.

== Career ==
He is known for his contributions in the field of Carnatic music. He is noted for inventing new Ragas and Talas such as Vandana Raga, Sri Durga Raga and Tinetradi Tala and Vedadi Tala. In 2021, he was awarded India's fourth-highest civilian award the Padma Shri in the Arts and Literature category. He was awarded the Fellowship of Andhra Pradesh Sangeeta Akademi in 1983.

== Awards and recognition ==
- Sangeet Natak Akademi Award, by the Government of India, 1996
- Fellowship of Andhra Pradesh Sangeet Akademi in 1983
- Padma Shri, by the Government of India, 2021
