= Anita Sharma =

Indian Sattriya dancer (b. 1969)

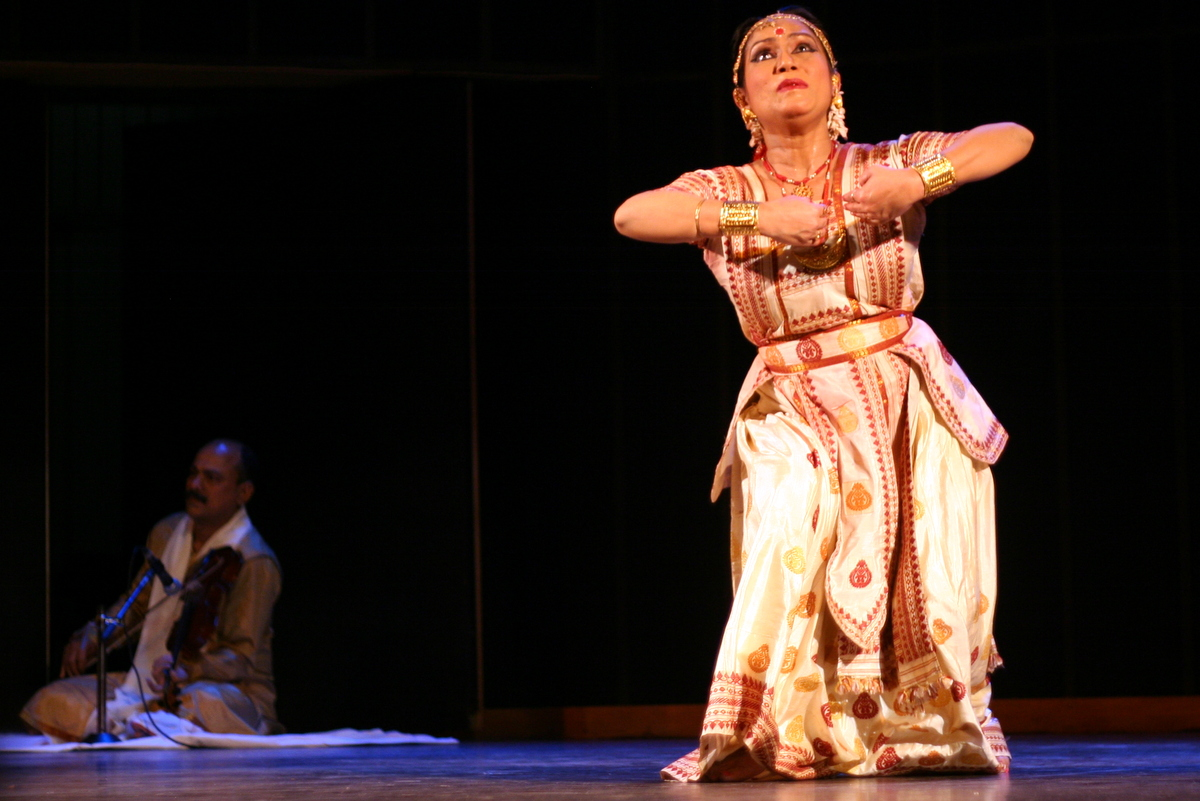
- Anita Sharma in a Sattriya performance
- Born: 1 March 1969 (age 57); Dibrugarh, Assam, India
- Education: Gauhati University
- Occupations: Sattriya dancer, dance teacher and choreographer
- Awards: Sangeet Natak Akademi Award (2014)

Anita Sharma is a Sattriya dancer from Assam, India. She has conducted extensive research on Assamese folk culture and the Sattriya dance form. In 2014, she received the Sangeet Natak Akademi Award for Sattriya dance.

== Biography ==
Anita Sharma was born on 1 March 1969 in Dibrugarh, Assam. She was interested in Indian classical dance forms from her childhood. She started learning Sattriya when she was only seven years old. She first trained in Sattriya dance under Roseshwar Saikia Bayan and later under Jatin Goswami. She has also trained in Odissi dance under Gorima Hazarika and Kelucharan Mohapatra. She holds a master's degree in Assamese literature.

=== Personal life ===
Her husband is Samar Sharma. Her daughter, Aarhie Kaushik, is also a Sattriya and Odissi dancer.

== Career ==
Anita, who holds a master's degree in Assamese literature from Gauhati University, has conducted extensive research on the Sattriya dance form and has used the results of her research in her dance choreography. She is an 'A'-grade artist of Doordarshan and an empanelled artist of the Indian Council for Cultural Relations. She has also written several articles on dance for the magazine 'Anunad'.

Anita has performed at major dance festivals in India, such as the Khajuraho Dance Festival, Konark Dance Festival, Delhi International Arts Festival, Indian Dance Festival, and the Bhagyachandra National Festival of Classical Dance. She has also performed in various parts of the country under the Sangeet Natak Akademi. She has performed at various venues outside India through the Indian Council for Cultural Relations, including the Sydney Dance Festival and the Erasing Borders & Drive East Festival in New York.

Anita is the founding director of Abhinaya Dance Academy in Guwahati, where she provides training in Sattriya dance and organizes the 'Parampara Dance and Music Festival' every year. In 2010, Anita and her husband, Samad Sharma, started the Parampara Festival.

=== Research ===
Anita was awarded a two-year Junior Fellowship by the Ministry of Human Resource Development, Department of Culture, Government of India, to conduct research on the topic "Different Forms of Folk Elements of Assam in Sattriya Dance". She also conducted research on Ojapali, a unique cultural tradition of Assam, under the Sattriya Kendra of the Sangeet Natak Akademi.

== Awards and honors ==
In 2012, Anita was honoured with the Nrutya Vidushi title during the International Dance Congress in Bhubaneswar. In 2013, she received the Devdasi Award instituted by the Devadasi National Dance Festival Committee, Bhubaneswar. In 2014, Anita Sharma received the Sangeet Natak Akademi Award for Sattriya dance. She received the Pankaj Charan Odissi Research Foundation's Mahari Award in 2024.
