= Prabhitangsu Das =

Indian Puppeteer

- Born: Agartala, Tripura, India
- Occupation: Puppeteer
- Known for: Puppetry
- Awards: Sangeet Natak Akademi Award (2016)

Prabhitangsu Das is an Indian puppeteer based in Agartala, Tripura. He is associated with Tripura Puppet Theatre, a puppetry organisation founded by Haripada Das in 1974. Das received the Sangeet Natak Akademi Award for puppetry in 2016.

== Career ==
Das learned puppetry from his father, Haripada Das. After Haripada Das's death in 1999, Das became associated with the management and activities of Tripura Puppet Theatre.

His work has included rod puppetry, string puppetry, glove puppetry and shadow puppetry. He has also been involved in puppetry training programmes for children and young learners in Tripura.

== Productions ==
Productions associated with Das and Tripura Puppet Theatre include adaptations of works by Rabindranath Tagore, including Chandalika, Bisarjan, Oporichita, Chhatrer Parikkha and Birpurush.

Other productions associated with him include Moments with Mahatma and Rani Lakshmibai.

== Public awareness work ==
Das has used puppetry in public awareness programmes. During the COVID-19 pandemic, he created a puppetry-based awareness video released on 21 March 2020, World Puppet Day, addressing social distancing and preventive measures.

Tripura Puppet Theatre has also performed election-awareness puppet shows in Tripura.

== International performances ==
In 2012, Tripura Puppet Theatre performed Bisarjan in Germany, including shows in Berlin, Hamburg, Munich and Dresden.

== Awards ==
- Sangeet Natak Akademi Award for puppetry, 2016
