= Nathrao Neralkar =

Indian Hindustani musician (1935–2021)

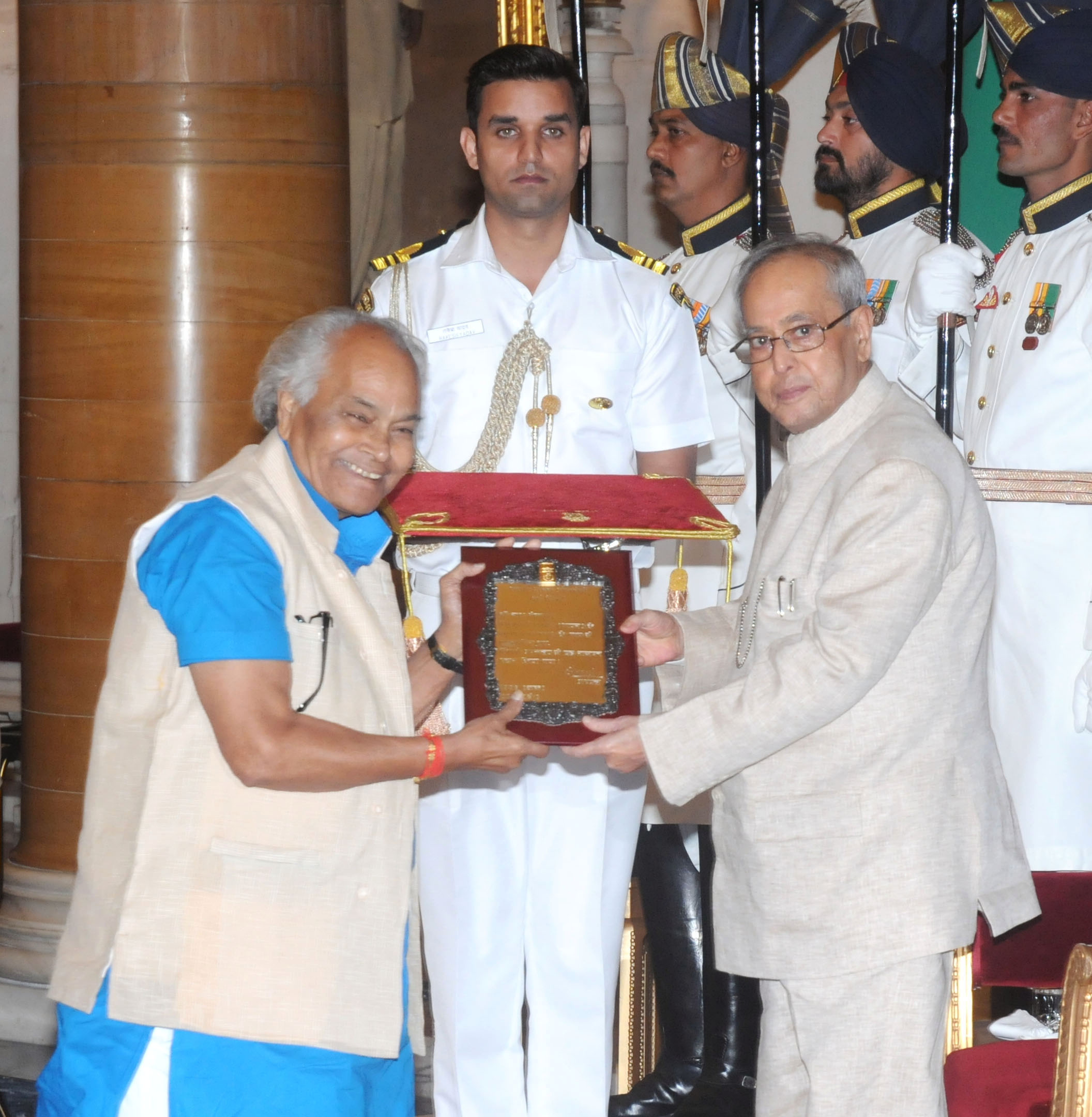
- Neralkar (left) receiving the Sangeet Natak Akademi Award from then Indian President Pranab Mukherjee (right) in October 2015
- Born: 16 November 1935; Nanded, Hyderabad State, British India (in present-day Maharashtra, India)
- Died: 28 March 2021 (aged 85); Aurangabad, Maharashtra, India
- Occupations: Musician; music teacher
- Known for: Hindustani vocal music
- Children: 3
- Awards: Sangeet Natak Akademi Award

Pandit Nathrao Neralkar (16 November 1935 – 28 March 2021) was an Indian Hindustani vocal musician and music teacher from the state of Maharashtra. He was conferred with Sangeet Natak Akademi Award, India's highest award in arts, for the year 2014.

== Personal life ==
Nathrao Neralkar was born on 16 November 1935 in Nanded, Hyderabad State (in present-day Maharashtra). He had two sons and a daughter.

== Hindustani music ==
Neralkar was a commended vocal artist in Hindustani classical music. He established a music school "Anant Sangeet Mahavidyalaya". In 1973, he started teaching music at Saraswati Bhuvan College in Aurangabad and eventually became the head of the music department and retired in 1995.

== Awards ==
Neralkar was conferred with Sangeet Natak Akademi Award, India's highest award in arts, by the Government of India for the year 2014 for his contributions to Hindustani music.

== Death ==
Neralkar died on 28 March 2021 due to cardiac arrest in Aurangabad following an illness due to an accident at his house 10 days earlier.
