= Nitu Kumari Nootan =

Indian folk music singer (born 1996)

- Born: 6 February 1975 (age 50); Motihari, Bihar
- Genres: Folk music
- Occupations: Singer; songwriter

Nitu Kumari Nootan (born 6 February 1975) is an Indian folk and semi-classical singer from Bihar.

For her distinguished work in the field of folk music, Nootan was honored with the Sangeet Natak Akademi Award by Smt. Draupadi Murmu, the President of India and was also felicitated by Prime Minister of India Shri. Narendra Modi during a cultural program held in Rameswaram, India. Smt. Nootan is the first women from Bihar to be conferred with the "Mauritius Bhojpuri Samman" by Kailash Purryag, the then President of Mauritius in 2013.

She is the member of executive committee and general council of Bihar Sangeet Natak Akademi, Patna and has been nominated for two consecutive terms as a member of the Sangeet Natak Akademi, Ministry of Culture (India).

== Early life ==
Nitu Kumari Nootan was born on 6 February 1975 in Motihari, Bihar, India. She developed an interest in art and music from an early age and pursued her passion throughout her academic journey. She completed her PhD in the field of folk music from Magadh University, Bihar.

== Singing career ==
Nitu Kumari Nootan received her formal training in classical and semi-classical music training from Late Shri Markande Mishra of Benares gharana and Late Shri Ram Singh of Kirana gharana. Despite her formal education in classical music, she chose folk music as her career.

She is the Empaneled Artist of Indian Council for Cultural Relations, Ministry of External Affairs (India). Dr. Nootan is also the ambassador of India's Folk culture.

Nootan is the first woman from Bihar to be designated as a "Rajya Guru" by the Sangeet Natak Akademi in recognition of her contributions to the promotion of Bihar's folk music Under the Kala Diksha Scheme of the Akademi.

Kumari Nootan served as a judge at the National Youth Festival, Viksit Bharat Young Leaders Dialogue 2025, held in New Delhi. The festival was initiated by the Hon’ble Prime Minister of India, Shri Narendra Modi, in 2025.

== Discography ==
=== Singles ===
- Kavan Phholwa Phoole Lahalahi (2016)
- Karab Navrat Aeso Suni Sajna (2016)
- Ho Deenanath (2018)
- Senur Shobhela Laale Laal (2018)
- Punya Laagi Ganga Asnaan (2018)
- Sevka ke Duvra (2018)
- Ganga Ji Ke Jhulmil Paniya (2018)
- Chhathi Aili Naihar (2018)
- Durga Maharani (20198)
- Dhan Dhan Bharat Desh (2021)
- Veena Wali Maiya Hamar (2021)
- Khelungi Aisi Hori (2021)
- Chaiti Geet (2021)
- Veer Kunwar Singh Babu (2021)
- Meera Bhajan (2022)
- Poovi Bhajan (2022)
- Karab Chhathi Ke Pujanawan (2022)
- Aaho Aaditnath (2022)
- Chhathi Maiya Rupawa Tohar (2022)
- Sohar (2024)

=== Albums ===
- Bhawani Aihein Angna (2016)
- Chhathi Aili Naihar (2018)

== Awards ==
- Sangeet Natak Akademi Award (2022) by the Honourable President of India Smt. Draupadi Murmu for her contribution to the folk music of Bihar
- Felicitated by Prime Minister Narendra Modi 2025
- 2019 "Lokvid Samman" by North Central Zone Cultural Centre (NCZCC), Ministry of Culture (India)
- Mahendra Misra Award London 2019
- Felicitated by Hon'ble President of Mauritius Kailash Purryag in 2013
