= Vellinezhi K. Nanu Nair =

Indian Kathakali exponent (1910–1987)

- Born: 1910; Vellinezhi, Palakkad District, British Raj
- Died: August 30, 1987 (aged 76–77)
- Occupation: Kathakali exponent
- Parents: Kariyattil Koppan Nair (father); Karthyayani Amma (mother)
- Awards: Sangeet Natak Akademi Award (1973)

Vellinezhi K. Nanu Nair, also spelled Vellinezhi K. Nanu Nayar (1910–1987), was an Indian Kathakali actor known for his performances in the antagonist Chuvanna Thadi (red beard) characters in Kathakali. He received the Sangeet Natak Akademi Award by the government of India in 1973.

== Early life and career ==
Nanu Nair was born in 1910 in Vellinezhi, a village in present-day Palakkad district of Kerala to Kariyattil Koppan Nair and Karthyayani Amma. His father was a Kathakali practitioner who belonged to the 'Kalluvazhi' school of Kathakali.

Nanu Nair began his Kathakali training at the age of 11 under his father at his home.

During the early twentieth century, certain role categories in Kathakali enjoyed greater prestige than others, and the allocation of roles during training was often influenced by the physical attributes of performers. Adolescent students who were considered suitable for female roles were trained accordingly, while those who grew taller and lost the physical features associated with Pacha or Kathi roles were frequently assigned to Chuvanna Thadi characters. Although born to Kariyattil Koppan Nair, who was a noted figure in the Kathakali scene at that time, after initial assessment nanu Nair was rejected from Kerala Kalamandalam, mentioning he was not suitable for Kathakali. His father, however, continued his training at home and Manakulam Kaliyogam owned by him and encouraged him to specialise in Chuvanna Thadi roles.

In the early part of his career, Nanu Nair performed female roles in Kathakali and from about 1934 he became associated particularly with the Chuvanna Thadi characters representing ferocious or antagonist roles. He was a member of the Kathakali performance groups like Manakulam Kaliyogam (1931), Vaachali Kittan (1931–32), and Karamvalli Kalivattom (1934–35). He became a Kathakali teacher at Vellinezhi High School in 1950 and retired in 1970. He died on 30 August 1987.

== Artistic contribution and influence ==
=== Contributions to Chuvanna Thadi roles ===
Before Nanu Nair's time, Chuvanna Thadi roles occupied a relatively marginal position in Kathakali. Performances featuring these characters were generally scheduled during the later hours of overnight performances and often attracted smaller audiences. They were also commonly accompanied by junior singers and percussionists rather than the more experienced musicians who accompanied prominent character types like Pacha and Kathi.

Nanu Nair introduced a distinctive stage approach to Chuvanna Thadi roles, particularly through his performances as Veerabhadra, Kali, Trigarta, Bakasura, Kalakeya, Dussasana and Jarasandha. His performances attracted the attention of both general audiences and knowledgeable connoisseurs of Kathakali, contributing to greater recognition of Chuvanna Thadi roles alongside established character types such as Pacha and Kathi.

=== Other contributions ===
Other than Chuvanna Thadi roles, Nanu Nair was also excelled in Karutha Thadi (black beard) roles like Kattala and Kari (black) roles like Nakratundi and Simhika.

Nair performed in various venues across India and abroad with Kerala Kalamandalam and other Kathakali groups.

== Awards ==
Nanu Nair was awarded Sangeet Natak Akademi Award by the government of India in 1973. It is said that it was the first central government award given to a Chuvanna Thadi performer. When asked about the honour, Nanu Nair remarked:

I am glad that recognition has finally arrived even for the reckless Chuvanna Thadi that emerges only in the drowsy final hours of the night.

== Legacy ==
=== Vellinezhi Nanu Nair Kalakendram ===
On 9 September 2001, the Vellinezhi Nanu Nair Smaraka Kalakendram was founded in his home village to preserve his memory and promote classical performing art forms of Kerala. The institution was established with Thazhathethil Kesavan Master as founding president and had noted persons like Kathakali masters Keezhpadam Kumaran Nair, Kalamandalam Ramankutty Nair, Kalamandalam Padmanabhan Nair, and Thayambaka scholar Mattannur Sankarankutty in advisory board. The center give training in Kathakali acting, music, chenda, maddalam, chutti (makeup), classical dance, and Panchavadyam.

=== Thaadiyarangu ===
The Thaadiyarangu is an annual Kathakali festival organised by the Vellinezhi Nanu Nair Kalakendram in memory of Nanu Nair and in recognition of the artistic status that the Chuvanna Thadi characters acquired through his work. The festival began in 2008 as part of the Kalakendram's annual celebrations and brought together leading performers of Chuvanna Thadi roles. Its programmes initially focused on relatively common characters such as Yavanan, Mannan, Mannathi and Ashari, which helped attract audiences who were not familiar with the scholarly traditions of Kathakali. Booklets explaining the stories and their presentation were also distributed to the audience, making the performances more accessible. Over time, the festival expanded to include more complex characters and stories while retaining its emphasis on making Kathakali accessible to a wider audience.
