= K. Vishwanatha Pulavar =

Indian Tholpavakoothu artist

- Born: 31 May 1963 (age 63); Koonathara, Palakkad district, Kerala
- Known for: Tholpavakoothu
- Awards: Kerala Folklore Academy Award (2013); Kerala Folklore Academy Fellowship (2021); Sangeet Natak Akademi Award (2022)

K. Vishwanatha Pulavar (born 31 May 1963) is a Tholpavakoothu (a type of shadow puppetry) artist from Kerala, India. He is known for his contributions to the promotion and preservation of the Tholpaavakoothu. In 2023, he received the Sangeet Natak Akademi Award for 2022 for his contributions to Tholpaavakoothu.

== Biography ==
Vishwanatha Pulavar was born on 31 May 1963 in Koonathara, Palakkad district, Kerala, into a family of traditional Tholpaavakoothu artists. He received training in Tholpavakoothu from his father K.L. Krishnankutty Pulavar, the founder of Tholpavakoothu Sangam, which works for the promotion of Tholpavakoothu. His brothers K. K. Ramachandra Pulavar and Lakshmana Pulavar are Tholpavakoothu artists. His wife Pushpalatha and his son Vipin Vishwanatha Pulavar are also Tholpavakoothu artists.

Apart from performing arts, Vishwanatha Pulavar also works Indian postal department as a postmaster in Koonathara.

== Artistic career and contributions ==
Vishwanatha Pulavar has contributed in popularizing Tholpavakoothu, which was confined to temples in Kerala, and bringing it to modern venues. He has performed in various states of India, as well as in Sweden, Singapore, Japan, Ireland, and Germany. He has performed more than 5000 performances. He has also conducted various workshops and exhibitions on this traditional art form.

Apart from the traditional Kambaramayanam, he has also presented the biography of Mahatma Gandhi, the Mahabharata, the biography of Sri Buddha, social awareness issues, etc. through Tholpavakkoothu.

== Awards and recognitions ==
Vishwanatha Pulavar, who won the Kerala State Folklore Academy Award in 2013, has also received the Folklore Academy Fellowship in 2021. In 2023, he received the Sangeet Natak Akademi Award for the year 2022 for his contributions to Tholpavakkoothu. He received the Guru Pooja Award of the Kerala State Kshetrakala Academy in 2024.

The film Nizhalattam, which has the central theme of Tholpavakoothu, is based on the life of Vishwanatha Pulavar. Its premiere show was held at the 2023 Kochi-Muziris Biennale.
