= Veenapani Chawla =

Veenapani Chawla was an Indian film director and writer. She won a Sangeet Natak Akademi Puraskar in 2010.
