= M. P. S. Namboodiri =

Indian Kathakali exponent

Kalamandalam M. P. S. Namboodiri
- Born: 1 July 1943 (age 82); Karkkad, Malabar District, British Raj
- Occupation: Kathakali exponent
- Awards: Sangeet Natak Akademi Award, Kerala Kalamandalam Mukundaraja Smruthi Award

Kalamandalam M. P. S. Namboodiri is a Kathakali exponent and academic in the field of Kathakali from Kerala, India. He received several noted awards including the Sangeet Natak Akademi Award 2013 and Kerala Kalamandalam Mukundaraja Smruthi Award 2019.

== Biography ==
Namboodiri was born on 1 July 1943 in Karikad in present-day Malappuram district to Moothedath Palisseri Manakkal Narayanan Namboothiri and Devasena Antharjanam. Namboodiri studied Kathakali in Kerala Kalamandalam and became a teacher there and retired as a principal. He was reappointed as the dean of the Department of Kathakali when Kalamandalam was upgraded as Deemed University. He is a visiting professor at University of California (UCLA) and the University of Wisconsin in the United States. He has published several articles on Kathakali in English and Malayalam and co-authored a book titled Kathakaliyude Rangapathacharithram with Killimangalam Vasudevan Namboodirippad.

== Family ==
He and his wife Leela have three children.

== Awards and honors ==
- Sangeet Natak Akademi Award 2013
- Kerala Kalamandalam Mukundaraja Smruthi Award 2019
