= Palai C. K. Ramachandran =

Indian Carnatic musician

- Born: 1929 (age 96–97); Palai, Kerala, India
- Occupations: Carnatic musician, music teacher
- Known for: Contributions to Carnatic music education and performance
- Awards: Sangeet Natak Akademi Award (2019); Swathi Sangeetha Puraskaram (2011); Swathi Music Award (2020); Madras Music Academy Gold Medal (1959)

Palai C. K. Ramachandran (born 1929) is an Indian Carnatic musician and music teacher from Kerala, known for his contributions to Carnatic music education and performance, and for receiving the Sangeet Natak Akademi Award in 2019.

== Early life and education ==
Ramachandran was born in 1929 in Palai, Kerala. He began learning Carnatic music at a young age and trained under several musicians. In 1959, he received a scholarship from the Government of India to study music in Chennai, where he trained under prominent Carnatic musician Chembai Vaidyanatha Bhagavathar.

== Career ==
Ramachandran worked as a music teacher at the Swathi Thirunal College of Music in Thiruvananthapuram, where he taught for several decades until his retirement in 1984. He has performed as a vocalist in Carnatic music concerts and has been recognized for his adherence to traditional styles.

== Awards and recognition ==
- In 1959, Ramachandran won a gold medal at the Carnatic music competition organized by the Madras Music Academy.
- In 2011, he was awarded the Swathi Sangeetha Puraskaram by the Government of Kerala for his contributions to Carnatic music.
- In 2019, he received the Sangeet Natak Akademi Award for his contributions to Carnatic music.
- In 2020, he received the Swathi Music Award from the Swathi Music Festival, alongside Carnatic musician T. M. Krishna.

== Personal life ==
As of 2019, Ramachandran resided in Thiruvananthapuram, Kerala, and remained active in music-related activities.
