= Manjula Ramaswamy =

Indian dancer (born 1958)

- Born: 28 March 1958 (age 68); Thanjavur district, Tamil Nadu
- Occupations: Bharatanatyam dancer and dance teacher
- Spouse: Ramaswamy Iyer
- Children: 2
- Parent(s): V.S. Ramamoorthy and Rajalakshmi Ramamoorthy
- Awards: Sangeet Natak Akademi Award (2022)

Manjula Ramaswamy is a Bharathanatyam dancer and dance teacher from Thanjavur, Tamil Nadu. Together with her father, she founded a dance academy called Sri Rama Nataka Niketan in Hyderabad. She received many awards and honors including the Ugadi Puraskar from the Andhra Pradesh government and Sangeet Natak Akademi Award for 2022.

== Biography ==
Manjula Ramaswamy was born on 28 March 1958 in Vishmanapettai village in Thanjavur district, Tamil Nadu, to Bharatanatyam dancer and dance teacher V.S. Ramamoorthy and Rajalakshmi Ramamoorthy. She started learning dance under her father at the age of eight.

She enrolled in the Hyderabad Central University to study dance and completed her studies with a gold medal in Bharatanatyam.

=== Personal life ===
Manjula married Ramaswamy Iyer at the age of 21, and the couple has two daughters. She currently resides in Hyderabad.

== Career ==
Manjula became a dance teacher at the age of ten. Together with her father V.S. Ramamurthy, Manjula started a dance academy called Sri Rama Natak Niketan in Hyderabad. She is the director of the institution now. As a Bharatanatyam teacher, she has trained more than 3000 students.

Her dance production, Deepa Tarangini, performed on brass plates and upside-down clay pots, holding small brass pots on their heads and holding lit candles in their hands, is notable. The Sri Rama Natak Niketan institute has been performing Deepa Tarangini since 1980.

Manjula is an empanelled bharathanatyam artist of Indian Council for Cultural Relations.

== Awards and honors ==
Manjula Ramaswamy is a recipient of the Ugadi Puraskar from the Andhra Pradesh government and the Nritya Kalasagar Puraskar from Kalasagar. The Sangeet Natak Akademi has honoured Manjula Ramaswamy with the 2022 Sangeet Natak Akademi Award for her contributions to Bharatanatyam.
