= Balwant Thakur =

Indian theatre personality and scholar (born 1960)

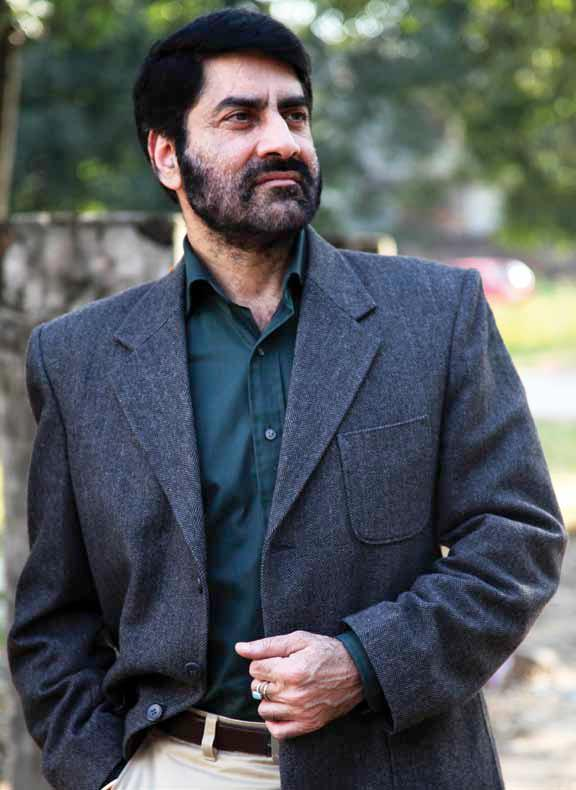
- Born: 25 December 1960 (age 65); Jammu and Kashmir, India
- Awards: Padma Shri; Sangeet Natak Akademi Award; Jammu and Kashmir Academy of Art, Culture and Languages award National Sanskriti Award; All India Citizen Award; Gurushree; Abhinayak Samman; Saptrishi Samman; Kala Nidhi Puraskar; Best Director Award; Dogra Rattan; Punjab Arts Council Honour; Dogri Sanstha Award; Maharaja Gulab Singh Memorial Award; Rabindra Nath Tagore Award; Gursharan Singh Theatre Commitment Award
- Website: www.balwantthakur.com

Balwant Thakur is an Indian theatre personality and scholar, known for bringing Dogri theatre to international notice. He was honoured by the Government of India, in 2013, by bestowing on him the Padma Shri, the fourth highest civilian award, for his contributions to the field of theatre.

== Biography ==
Balwant Thakur was born on 25 December 1960 in small mountain village Bakkal Reasi district of the north Indian state of Jammu and Kashmir, to Hari Saran Thakur, a locally known traditional art performer. He graduated in business management and economics from the Government M. A. M. college, University of Jammu and followed it with a graduation in law. He continued studies and secured a post graduate degree in mass communication. After the studies, he turned to research and, with the assistance of a National Senior Fellowship from the Ministry of Human Resource Development, Government of India, in 1990, he did three years of research on the heritage of performing arts of Jammu. He also won a Ford Foundation grant for his research work under the title, Search for a new Theatre language.

Thakur showed his taste for theatre at an early age when he, along with six of his friends, formed a children's theatre group called Seven Stars. The group staged a few plays such as Sabhya Saanp and Kanyadaan. During his student days, he was also active in college theatre activities as well as on Radio Kashmir, writing and presenting items in its Yuva Vani service.

Natrang was said to be a success from inception, collecting a State Academy award for best production for his play, Chauraha. During the next three years, the group staged plays such as Neeli Jheel, Nanhen Kandhey Nanhen Pair, Singhasan Khali Hai and Rang Nagri and won the State Academy awards for four consecutive years from 1983 to 1986.

By this time, Thakur's attention has been set on the traditional theatre of Dogri. The first Dogri play he staged, Bawa Jitto, was staged at the North Zone Theatre Festival at Kurukshetra, which earned the play a slot in the National Theatre Festival, New Delhi. The play received critical reviews and has been staged in many parts of India. A few years later, in 1990, he premiered his play, Mahabhoj, a stage adaptation of a popular novel of the same name by Manu Bhandari, which was an exploration to find new alternatives to the set theatrical patterns. The play was judged the best play of the year in the North Zone and was selected for the National Theatre Festival, 1990.

Thakur's next attempt was at the Children's theatre, Mere Hisse Ki Dhoop Kahan Hai, which was a UNESCO project. The reports say that the play was a success with over 50 stages in and out of the state of Jammu and Kashmir. The play was later made into a movie and screened at the Asia-Pacific Film Festival in Bangkok.

Thakur has written many plays such as Suno Eh Kahani, Aaj Ki Aurat, Is Gran Gi Surg Banai Lo, Anpaden Da Hall, Jalo Khala, Mere Bi Ehen Kish Khaab and Aag and children's plays, Aap Hamare Hain Kaun, and Bhag Beta Bhag. The plays brought Natrang nationwide fame and the group travelled in many parts of India including Chandigarh, Shimla, Delhi, Lucknow, Allahabad, Jodhpur, Hyderabad, Kolkata, Goa and Bhubaneshwar. The rigours of managing a full-time job as the secretary of the Jammu and Kashmir Academy of Art, Culture and Languages along with his commitment towards Natrang made him quit the job in 2003, and started to devote his time entirely to theatre.

== Legacy ==
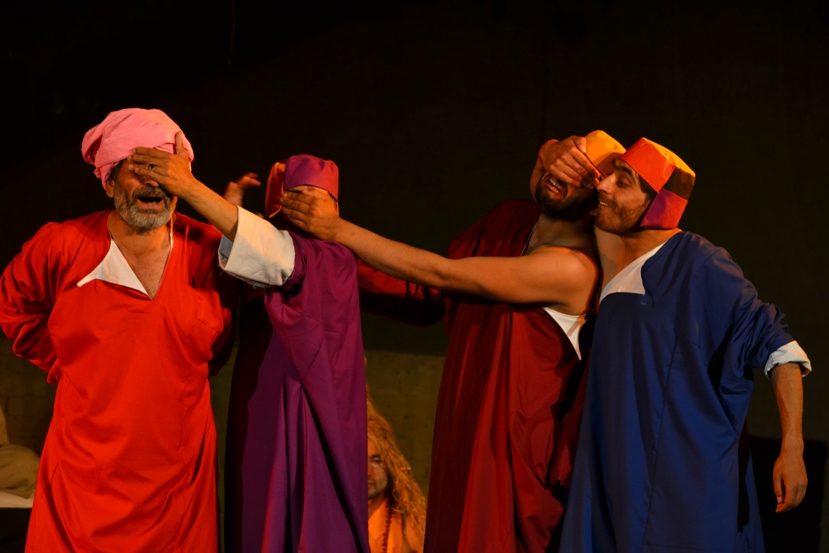
Bhand Pather

One of Thakur's major contributions to Indian theatre is the group he founded and the activities he accomplished under its aegis. After quitting from his job as the Secretary of the Jammu and Kashmir Academy of Art, Culture and Languages, he started an annual event, the Natrang Theatre Festival. He also started a weekend show called Sunday Show, in 2004, which has been staging shows every week unabated through the regional turmoil, reaching 500 weekly theatre shows, considered to be a record of sorts.

Thakur is credited with the revival of the traditional theatre of Dogri and Bhand Pather. Thakur, with assistance from playwright, Moti Lal Kemmu, embarked on a project in which they assembled 1,000 Bhand Pather performers from 20 groups, trained them in modern theatre techniques leading to 40 productions in this traditional style.

== Awards and recognitions ==
In 2013, the Government of India honoured Thakur with the fourth highest civilian award, Padma Shri. He is a recipient of the Sangeet Natak Akademi Award, which he received in 1999. He has also won the Jammu and Kashmir Academy of Art, Culture and Languages award three times, in 1983, 1984 and 1985. His other awards and recognitions are:

- Ford Foundation Research grant
- National Sanskriti Award - 1992
- All India Citizen Award for culture - 1994
- Gurushree - 1995
- Abhinayak Samman - 1996
- Saptrishi Samman - 2001
- Kala Nidhi Puraskar - 2004
- Best Director Award - Doordarshan Theatre festival - 2005
- Dogra Rattan - 2006
- Punjab Arts Council Honour - 2007
- Dogri Sanstha Award - 2010
- Maharaja Gulab Singh Memorial Award - 2011
- Rabindra Nath Tagore Award - 2011
- Gursharan Singh Theatre Commitment Award (World Theatre Day Honour) - 2013

Sangeet Natak Akademi honoured Thakur by hosting a retrospective of five of his plays, under the theme, Theatre Days with Balwant Thakur at Tagore Theatre in Chandigarh, in 2006. Four theatre festivals, in Russia, Germany, Hungary and Poland, staged his play, Ghumayee, in 2009.

== See also ==
- Dogri
- Bhand Pather
- Moti Lal Kemmu
