= Sarajubala Devi =

Bengali actress and singer

- Born: 1912
- Died: 22 July 1994 (aged 81–82)
- Occupations: Actress; Singer

Sarajubala Devi (1912–1994) was a Bengali actress and singer.

== Early life ==
Sarajubala was born in 1912 in 24 Parganas. She lost her father at a young age. In order to contribute to her family's income, she started working as an actor at the age of nine.

== Career ==
Sarajubala's first role was in the stage play Kumar Singha, where she played a role of a boy. For her performance in the play, she received the gold medial and a monetary reward of 5 Rupees. She became a regular at the New Manomohan Theatre of Nirmalendu Lahiri. She performed in the play Mirabai, where she played the role of Krishna. She received widespread acclaim for her performance. Her performance was compared to notable contemporaries such as Kusum Kumari and Tara Sundari. After Mirabai, she joined the acting troupe Dani Babu. She played the role of Sati with Dani Babu when she was 14 years old in the play Daksa-Yajva. She also played Kunda Nadini in the play Bisbrksa when she was 14 and which got her widespread acclaim. She co-starred with notable contemporaries, for example Shishir Kumar Bhaduri and Durgadas Banerjee in plays such as Chandra Sekhar, Gairik Pataka, Mrgaya, Karagar, Mahuya and Shyamoli. Her notable roles include playing Jahanara in the play Shah Jahan by Dwijendralal Roy, and Lutfa in the play Sirajuddaula by Sachindra Nath Sengupta. Besides acting in plays, she also acted in movies. She had roles in movies such as Rasir Prem and Krishvankanter Will. She also used to sing and trained under Krishan Chandra Roy and the future National Poet of Bangladesh, Kazi Nazrul Islam. Throughout her career, she won many awards and prizes. She was awarded the title "Empress of Acting" for her performances. In 1970, she won an Indian Academy Award and the gold medal from the University of Calcutta.

== Death ==
Sarajubala died in 1994.
