= C.K. Balagopalan =

Indian classical dancer

- Born: 4 September 1939; Cheruvathur, Kasargod district, Kerala, India
- Died: 24 August 2019 (aged 79); Chennai, Tamil Nadu, India
- Occupations: Classical dancer, choreographer, teacher
- Known for: Portrayal of Hanuman in Kalakshetra's Ramayana
- Children: Prithvija Balagopalan
- Awards: Sangeet Natak Akademi Award (2002)

C.K. Balagopalan (4 September 1939 – 24 August 2019) was an Indian classical dancer, choreographer, and teacher renowned for his contributions to Bharatanatyam and Kathakali. A prominent figure associated with the Kalakshetra Foundation in Chennai, he gained widespread recognition for his portrayal of Hanuman in the institution's dance-drama productions of the Ramayana. His artistry, dedication, and versatility made him a celebrated name in the Indian classical dance community.

== Early life ==
C.K. Balagopalan was born on 4 September 1939 in Cheruvathur, a village in the Kasargod district of Kerala, then part of the Malabar region. His father, Rasikasiromani Koman Nair, was a local actor known as the "Charlie Chaplin of Malabar" for his comedic performances. Balagopalan's early exposure to the performing arts came through his father's involvement in amateur theatre. In 1953, at the age of 13, he was selected by Kathakali maestro Chandu Panikkar to join Kalakshetra, along with his friend V. P. Dhananjayan. He began his formal training in Bharatanatyam and Kathakali under Rukmini Devi Arundale, the founder of Kalakshetra, and Panikkar on 7 October 1953, coinciding with Vijayadashami.

== Career ==
Balagopalan spent over six decades at Kalakshetra, evolving from a student to a repertory artist and eventually a revered teacher. His career was marked by his ability to embody a diverse range of characters in Kalakshetra’s dance dramas, including Lakshmana, Bharata, Krishna, and Kannappar. However, his portrayal of Hanuman became his signature role, earning him the nickname "Hanuman Balagopalan." Despite his small stature, his expressive abhinaya (gesture-based acting) and commanding stage presence captivated audiences for over 30 years. Rukmini Devi’s decision to cast him as Hanuman, despite initial skepticism about his physique, proved transformative. Balagopalan prepared for the role with rigorous rituals of abstinence and meditation, reflecting his deep spiritual connection to the character. His performances were noted for their emotional intensity and technical precision, blending the physicality of Kathakali with the grace of Bharatanatyam. Beyond performing, Balagopalan served on Kalakshetra’s governing board and was known for mentoring younger dancers, including Hari Padman, who succeeded him as Hanuman. In 2018, he collaborated with V. P. Dhananjayan for Aanjaneyam, a production by Apsaras Arts in Singapore, fulfilling a long-standing wish to perform together again.

== Personal life and legacy ==
Balagopalan’s life was deeply intertwined with Kalakshetra and his guru, Rukmini Devi Arundale, whom he regarded as a maternal figure. He was unable to attend his biological mother’s funeral due to a performance commitment in Delhi, a regret he carried until he was present at Rukmini Devi’s deathbed years later. His daughter, Prithvija Balagopalan, continues his legacy as an accomplished Bharatanatyam dancer. He remained active until his final days, rehearsing for Kalakshetra’s production of Kumarasambhavam in 2019. C.K. Balagopalan died on 24 August 2019 in Chennai due to a cardiac arrest, at age 79.

== Awards and recognition ==
Balagopalan received numerous accolades for his contributions to Indian classical dance, including the Sangeet Natak Akademi Award in 2002. His biography, Leap of Faith: Mesmeric Hanuman of Kalakshetra, written by his disciple Eliza Louis, was published in 2018.
