= Basant Kabra =

- Born: May 9, 1959 (age 67); Jodhpur, Rajasthan, India
- Origin: India
- Genres: Hindustani classical music
- Occupation: Musician
- Instrument: Sarod

Basant Kabra is an Indian Hindustani classical sarod player from the Senia Maihar gharana. He is a recipient of the Sangeet Natak Akademi Award, India's highest national honor given to practicing artists in the performing arts, awarded for his contributions to Hindustani instrumental music.

== Early life and background ==
Basant Kabra was born into a family of industrialists and connoisseurs of Hindustani classical music. His family background introduced him to classical music at a young age. He is the nephew of the Indian slide guitarist Brij Bhushan Kabra and the son of Damodarlal Kabra.

== Musical career ==
Born on 9 May 1959 in Jodhpur, Rajasthan, Basant Kabra received his initial training in sarod under the guidance of his father, Damodarlal Kabra. He later honed his craft under the tutelage of Annapurna Devi.

Affiliated with the Maihar-Senia gharana, Kabra's performances are distinguished by Dhrupad Ang Alaps, impeccable phrasing, and technical virtuosity. Over a career spanning six decades, he has performed at numerous prestigious music festivals across India and overseas. He is also designated as a Top-Grade artist for All India Radio and Doordarshan.

== Awards and recognition ==
- 1985: Navdeep Puraskar, presented by the President of India.
- 1985: Yuva Ratna Award, bestowed by the Chief Minister of Rajasthan.
- 2012: Marwar Sangeet Ratna Award.
- 2013: Rajasthan Sangeet Natak Akademi Award.
- 2022: Sangeet Natak Akademi Award for Hindustani Instrumental Music (Sarod).
