= Sarojini Nangiaramma =

Indian Koodiyattam exponent

- Born: 20 October 1940; Chovvara, Kingdom of Cochin, British India
- Died: 10 November 2025 (aged 85); Chovvara, Eranakulam district, Kerala
- Other name: Sarojini Nangiar
- Occupations: Koodiyattam and Nangiar koothu performer
- Spouse: Mani Parameshwara Chakyar
- Children: 2, Kalamandalam Narayanan Nambiar and Edanad Ramachandran Nambiar
- Parents: Villuvatta Ravunni Nambiar (father); Ammukutty Nangiaramma (mother)
- Awards: Sangeet Natak Akademi Award (2015); Kerala Kalamandalam Award (2020)

Sarojini Nangiaramma also known as Sarojini Nangiar was a Koodiyattam and Nangiar koothu exponent from Kerala, India. She received the Sangeet Natak Akademi Award in 2015. She was the first Nangiar to receive this national honor. In 2021 she received the Kerala Kalamandalam Award for koodiyattam for the year 2020.

== Biography ==
Sarojini Nangiaramma was born on 20 October 1940 in Edanad Nambiar Madhom in Chovvara village near Aluva in present-day Kerala, into a family of kurtiyattam artists. Her mother Ammukutty Nangiaramma and father Villuvatta Ravunni Nambiar were Koodiyattam and Nangiar koothu artists. She learned koodiyattam and nangiar koothu from her parents as well as from her aunt Kochukutty Nangiaramma. She began her kootiyattam training at the age of 7 under traditional training methods.

Sarojini Nangiaramma made her debut at the Edanad Bhagavathy temple at the age of 9.

Since performing Koothu was not a source of income for her, Sarojini started weaving at the age of 16 to earn money for her living expenses and worked under the Khadi Board until she was 64.

=== Personal life and death ===
Her husband, late Mani Parameshwara Chakyar, was a Koothu and Koodiyattam artist. Her sons Kalamandalam Narayanan Nambiar and Edanad Ramachandran Nambiar are Mizhavu artists. She died on November 10, 2025, at her residence in Chovvara, Eranakulam district.

== Career ==
Following tradition, Sarojini Nangiaramma performed Koodiyattam and Nangiar koothu mainly in temples in Kerala. For several years, she had been performing Nangiar koothu at the Tripunithura Poornathrayisha temple. She has performed at more than thousand venues. She mainly performed Koodiyattam in temples, and may have only performed outside a temple during the first three years of the Tourism Week celebrations, which have been organized by the Kerala Tourism Department since 1980.

In addition to the Nangiar Kooth, she also performed the Kooths of Angulyankam, Mattavilasam and Mantrankam. She presented a paper on Koodiyattam and Angulyankam at an international seminar organized by UNESCO.

Sarojini Nangiyaramma has also performed with Kootiyattam legends like Painkulam Rama Chakyar, Mani Madhava Chakyar, and Ammannur Madhava Chakyar.

== Awards and honors ==
Sarojini Nangiaramma received the Sangeet Natak Akademi Award in 2015. She was the first Nangiar to receive this national honour. In 2021 she received the Kerala Kalamandalam Award for koodiyattam for the year 2020.
