= Prakash Khandge =

Indian academic

Prakash Khandge is an Indian academic, researcher and writer based in Mumbai, Maharashtra. His specialisation is folk dances of Maharashtra. He is a member of the Sangeet Natak Akademi and he is the founder and head of Lok Kala Academy (Performing folk arts department) of the University of Mumbai. He was president of the 2011 Akhil Bharatiya Marathi Lok Kala Sammelan held at Karad. In 2019, he was a recipient of a Sangeet Natak Akademi Award for folk arts.

== Personal life ==
Khandge was born in Pimpalgaon a village in Ahmednagar district. His father and grandfather were kirtankars. He grew up in an atmosphere surrounded by traditional devotional practices such as the singing of kakad arti and abhang. He participated in the vari at age 9. When Khandge was in fourth standard, he relocated to Mumbai's working-class neighbourhood of Lalbaug, There he was exposed to folk performing art forms such as Balya dance, Gajnritya, Talwar dandpatte, Zimma phugdya and the like.

== Books ==
- Bhandar buka
- Nohe eklyacha khel - (autobiography)
- Khandoba che jagran based on his doctoral thesis "Jagran - Ek vidhinatya: itihas, vangmaya, prayog'".
- Chal mazya payat
