= SCR Bhatt =

Classical Hindustani musician

Pandit SCR Bhatt
- Born: Shukla Chandrashekhar Ramakrishna Bhatt; 12 March 1919; Shirali, Karnataka, India
- Genres: Hindustani classical music
- Occupations: Singer; Music educator

Shukla Chandrashekhar Ramakrishna (SCR) Bhatt is an Indian musician. He was trained in Swaragyan. His guru was Krishnabhat Honnawar belonging to the Patiala Gharana. He was also trained under S.N. Ratanjankar alias Annasaheb. Bhat received the title of "Sangeet Acharya", Due to his Exceptionally Distinctive Teaching skills and Command over known and rare ragas. The title was given by Swamiji of Sri Vallabh Shikshan Sangeet ashram based in Sion. Pandit SCR Bhat was the senior most and dedicated disciple of Shrikrishna Narayan Ratanjankar.Shrikrishna Narayan Ratanjankar was also known as Padmabhushan Acharya Ratanjankar.

Bhat trained many musicians Talat Mahmood. Pt. K.G.Ninde, Pt. Dinkar Kai kini, Pt. Yashwant Mahale, Pt. C.R.Vyast, Ulhas Bapat, Smt. Zarine Sharma (Daruwala), Sunil Kant Gupta-flautist.

== Early life ==
He was born in Shirali, Karnataka. SCR has his initial training at Swaragyan that lasted over 2 years. Later Krishnabhat put Bhat under the tutelage of Padmabhushan Dr. S.N Ratanjankar for further advanced training in music from whom he learnt for more than 35 years. He received the title of Mahamahopadhyaya and Sharang Dev.

== Awards ==
- Tansen Sanman(1993).
- Karnataka Sangeet Academy award(1999-2000).
