= M. R. Gautam =

Indian Hindustani classical vocalist (born 1924)

Madura Ramaswami Gautam (born 19 March 1924), often shortened to M. R. Gautam, is an Indian Hindustani classical vocalist of the Agra Gharana.

== Early life ==
Gautam was born in March 1924 in Tiruchappali, Tamil Nadu. Gautam learned under Ramarao Naik of Bangalore for many years.

== Career ==
After learning under Ramarao Naik many years he continued to learn under Vilayat Hussain Khan and Dilip Chandra Vedi of Delhi. He gives many concerts all over India and was the leader of the Banaras Hindu University as well as the Vice Chancellor of the Khairagarh Music University.

Gautam was honoured with the Uttar Pradesh Sangeet Natak Akademi Award in 2008. He is also a Fellow of the Royal Asiatic Society in London.
