= Tara Sundari =

Bengali theater actress

- তারা সুন্দরী
- Born: Tara Sundari; 1878; Calcutta, Bengal Presidency, British India
- Died: 19 April 1948; West Bengal, India
- Occupations: Theatre actress, singer, dancer

Tara Sundari (stage name Tarasundari) (1878 - 19 April 1948) was a Bengali theater actress, singer, and a dancer. She is known for notable performances in plays such as Durgeshnandini, Harishchandra, and Riziya. Tarasundari and Aparesh Chandra were one of the most successful on-stage pair of the Bengali theatre actors.

== Early life ==
Tara Sundari was born to a poor family in Calcutta in 1878. She had an elder sister named Nrityokali. The actress, Binodini Dasi, was her neighbour there.

== Career ==
In 1884, with the help of Binodini, she joined the Star Theatre in Kolkata. Her first role was in Chaitanya Lila by Girish Chandra Ghosh, where she played the role of a boy. She learned to act from Amritalal Mitra. Kashinath Chattopadhay was her dance teacher. Her first role as a girl was in 1889 at the play Haranidhi by Girish Chandra Ghosh. She learned to sing from Ramtaran Sanyal for this play. While there, she started using the stage name, 'Tarasundari'.

After appearing in three shows, she left the Star Theatre. At that time the Minerva Theatre, under the supervision of Girish Ghosh, was producing Karmeti Bai. An actress known as Tinkori, who was playing the lead role, left the theatre at the same time. Tarasundari, on Girish Ghosh's request, temporarily played the role of Karmeti Bai for two shows. She was praised for a remarkable performance on such short notice. In the year 1894, her portrayal of Shaibalini in the play Chandrashekhar made her very popular. She acted in the play Sarala where she played the role of Gopal. She appeared in a few shows at City Theatre during this time also. She then took a break from acting.

== Later career ==
After a long hiatus from theatre, Tarasundari returned to acting when the Indian Dramatic Club opened under the supervision of Amarendranath Datta, a well known actor and playwright of that time. She took part in a number of plays, where her acting was acclaimed.

When Amarendranath formed Classic Theatre in 1897, Tarasundari joined it with him. Here she gave one of the finest performances of her life as Sreelekha in Hariraj. After leaving the Classic Theatre, she rejoined the Star Theatre. Her memorable performances during this time include Shaiba/Shaivya in Harishchandra, Basantashena, and Annapurna in Mayabosan. She went on to work with other groups like the newly established Arora, Minerva, and Kohinoor Theatres.

After that, in 1922, she again left acting for some time following the death of her son. She moved to Bhubaneshwar where she founded a monastery, and devoted her time to religious activities.

== Return from retirement and death ==
At the request of Girish Chandra Ghosh she returned to Kolkata and started acting again. Her first play after returning from retirement was Ayesha in Durgeshnandini. She went on to act in Harishchandra as Shaivya, she played the protagonist in Rizia, and Saraswati in Balidan. She worked in the early days of theater in Bengal with Shishir Kumar Bhaduri. The pinnacle of her career came when she worked at the Mitra Theatre. She acted in Jana as the titular character, and played the role of Durga in Shre Durga in 1926.

She died in 1948.
