= Rani Balbir Kaur =

Rani Balbir Kaur is a Punjabi theater personality living in India.

== Awards ==
In 2015, Rani Balbir Kaur was selected for the Sangeet Natak Akademi Award.
