= Vazhenkada Kunchu Nair =

Indian scholar

Vazhenkada Kunchu Nair, also spelt Kunju Nair, (1909-1981) was an Indian Kathakali dancer.

== Life ==
He mainly served in PSV Natya Sangham, Kottakkal, since 1946, and from 1960 to 1972 at Kerala Kalamandalam. He was the first principal of Kerala Kalamandalam, the premier performing arts institute of Kerala in south India. A Padma Shri and Sangeet Natak Akademi Awardee, Kunchu Nair was a student of Pattikkamthodi Ramunni Menon, and was noted for his subdued portrayal of lead Kathakali roles like Nalan, Rukmangadan, Dharmaputrar, Bhiman, Arjunan, Brahmanan (in the storyplay Santanagopalam) and Parasuraman (Sitaswayamvaram) besides in anti-hero slots like Ravanan and Duryodhanan.

Nair died on 19 February 1981 after prolonged illness.
