= Moti Lal Kemmu =

Indian playwright (1939–2018)

- Born: 1933; Srinagar, Jammu and Kashmir, British Raj
- Died: 16 April 2018 (aged 84–85)
- Occupation: Playwright
- Relatives: Kunal Khemu (grandson)

Moti Lal Kemmu (1933 – 16 April 2018) was an Indian contemporary playwright from Jammu and Kashmir.

== Early life ==
He was born in Srinagar into a Kashmiri Pandit family and attended Jammu and Kashmir University. His plays include Nagar Udas, Teen Asangati Aikanki (1968), Lal Drayas Lol Re (1972), Trunove (1970), Tshai (1973), Natak Truche (1980), Tota Tol Aina (1985).

== Awards and honours ==
He received the Sahitya Akademi Award in 1982 for his contribution to Kashmiri Literature as a playwright.

He received the Padma Shri award in 2012.
