= Revathi Ramachandran =

Kalaimamani Revathi Ramachandran
- Born: 21 May 1960 (age 66); Chennai, Tamil Nadu, India
- Education: M.A in Economics
- Occupations: Bharatanatyam dancer, choreographer, teacher, arts administrator
- Years active: 1972–present
- Known for: Director of Kalakshetra Foundation (2018–2023), exponent of Suddha Nrittam
- Awards: Kalaimamani Award (1994)

Revathi Ramachandran (born 21 May 1960) is an Indian Bharatanatyam dancer, choreographer, teacher, and arts administrator. She served as the Director of the Kalakshetra Foundation in Chennai from April 2018 to October 2023. A specialist in the Melattur style of Bharatanatyam, she is recognized as the sole exponent of Suddha Nrittam, a temple dance tradition revived by her guru, Mangudi Dorairaja Iyer.

== Early life and education ==
Ramachandran was born on 21 May 1960 in Chennai, Tamil Nadu. Her mother, Jaya Venkatraman, a student of musician M. L. Vasanthakumari, introduced her to dance. She completed her arangetram in 1972 at age twelve and holds an M.A. in Economics. In her youth, she captained the Tamil Nadu Women's Basketball team in the early 1980s and briefly worked at Indian Bank before pursuing dance full-time.

== Dance career ==
Trained by Guru Mangudi Dorairaja Iyer in the Melattur style of Bharatanatyam, Ramachandran is the sole practitioner of Suddha Nrittam, a temple dance form he revived. She also studied nattuvangam under Guru Bhagavatulu Seetarama Sarma at Kala Peetham, Chennai, veena under Kalpagam Swaminathan, and Kuchipudi under Vempati Chinna Satyam, and received guidance from Padma Subrahmanyam. As an A-grade artist of Doordarshan, she has performed solo recitals and dance-dramas across India at venues such as Sri Krishna Gana Sabha (1981, 1986, 1991, 1995, 2002, 2003), Sri Parthasarathy Swami Sabha, Music Academy, Chennai (1997, 2003), Chidambaram Natyanjali Festival (1988), Mamallapuram Dance Festival, and festivals organized by Narada Gana Sabha, Kartik Fine Arts, and Bharatiya Vidya Bhavan. Internationally, she has performed in the United States, Canada, France, Germany, the United Kingdom, Malaysia, and at the World Conference on Peace and Religion. Notable performances include a 1992 tour with the International Dance Alliance’s ballet Krishnam Vande Jagatgurum and a choreographic workshop for India Dance Wales in Cardiff, UK, in 2004.

Her productions, such as Jagat Pavani Ganga, Devi, and Upanishad Bharatham, explore spiritual themes from the Upanishads. Other works include Sri Venkatesa Suprabhatam, Sri Lakshmi Narasimha Karavalambam, Thennadu Udaiya Sivane Potri, Ambalathil Aadum Jyothi, Navavidha Bhakthi, Aayar Kula Thilakam, Jaya Jaya Bharatham, and Lakshmi Vaibhavam, which highlight themes of worship and Indian culture. She founded Kala Sadhanalya, a Bharatanatyam school in Abiramapuram, Chennai, dedicated to the Melattur style, and serves as secretary of the International Dance Alliance, Madras chapter.

Ramachandran received a fellowship from the Ministry of Human Resource Development in 1989 to research Bhagavata Mela, a traditional dance-drama. She has assisted scholars like T.S. Parthasarathy, Arudra, and R. Nagaswamy by demonstrating Suddha Nrittam and Tiru Tala Jati during their lectures. She organizes an annual festival in memory of her guru, Mangudi Dorairaja Iyer. She has also contributed to media, providing video footage for the CD-ROM Bharatanatyam by Info-Drive, directing the Doordarshan serial Deiveega Thirumanangal, and producing Bharatha Deviyin Parimanangal and dance sequences for Jnaana Parambarai and Manam Kulir Margazhi. Her awards include the Kalaimamani, Nadana Maamani, Yuva Kala Bharathi (1992), Isai Kalai Chelvar (1993), Natya Kala Sikhamani, Arsha Kala Bhushanam, Vani Kalasudhakar (2005), Singarmani (1983), and Best Dancer awards from the Music Academy (1988) and Narada Gana Sabha.

== Directorship at Kalakshetra ==
Appointed Director of the Kalakshetra Foundation in April 2018 by the Union Ministry of Culture, Ramachandran succeeded Priyadarsini Govind. Her tenure, originally three years, was extended until October 2023. She aimed to make Kalakshetra’s dance, music, and allied arts programs more accessible. In 2021, she faced criticism for allegedly mishandling a food poisoning outbreak at the Kalakshetra hostel, with reports that students were asked to apologize for raising concerns. In 2023, protests arose over sexual harassment allegations against four faculty members, including Hari Padman, who was arrested in April 2023. Students claimed Ramachandran dismissed complaints and led the Internal Complaints Committee, raising conflict-of-interest concerns. The Tamil Nadu State Commission for Women investigated over 90 complaints and summoned Ramachandran to review the committee’s operations. An inquiry led by retired Justice K. Kannan recommended administrative reforms. Ramachandran resigned on 31 October 2023, and was succeeded by Aneish Rajan, Deputy Secretary at the Union Ministry of Culture.

== Personal life ==
Ramachandran lives in Abiramapuram, Chennai. Her daughter, Manaswini, is a Bharatanatyam dancer and manages Kala Sadhanalya when Ramachandran is occupied with administrative responsibilities.

== Awards ==
- 1995: Received title of Kalaimamani Award by the Government of Tamil Nadu, which is the highest state honour in the field of Arts
- 1983: Awarded Singar Mani by Sur Singar Samsad.
- 1987: Awarded The Music Academy Award as Best dancer in Spirit of Youth Series
- 1988: Best Dancer by The Music Academy
- 1992: Yuva Kala Bharathi by Bharat Kalachar.
- 1993: Isai Kalai Chelvar
- 1997: Best Dancer by Narada Gana Sabha
- 2005: Vani Kalasudhakar
- 2007: Indian Fine Arts Society Award
- 2010: Nrithya Kala Sironmani by Nungambakkam Cultural Academy Trust.
- Awarded Arsha Kala Bhushanam by Pujya Swami Dayananda Saraswathy.
- Nritya Choodamani
- Nadana Maamani
- Natya Kala Sikhamani
- Arsha Kala Bhushanam.
