= Umayalpuram K. Narayanaswamy =

Kalaimamani Umayalpuram K. Narayanaswamy
- Born: 1929; India
- Died: 5 August 1997 (aged 67–68) Chennai, Tamil Nadu, India
- Genre: Carnatic
- Occupation: percussionist
- Instrument: Ghatam
- Award: Kalaimamani Award (1994)

Umayalpuram K. Narayanaswamy (1929–1997, India), was a Carnatic classical percussionist. He established his mark playing the ghatam.

== Death ==
K. Narayanaswamy passed away at a private hospital in Chennai on 5th August 1997 following a brief illness aged 68.

== Awards ==
- 1994: Received title of Kalaimamani Award by the Government of Tamil Nadu, which is the highest state honour in the field of Arts.
