= Vidya Subramanian =

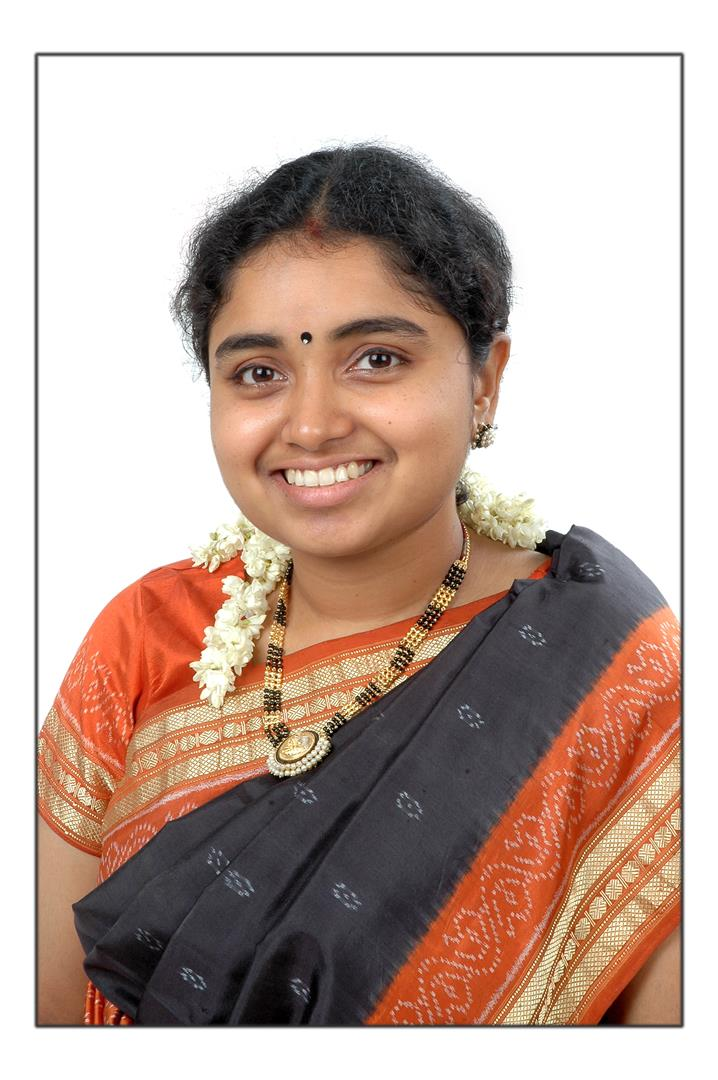

Background information
- Origin: Chennai, India
- Genres: Carnatic; Classical
- Occupations: Vocalist, Teacher, Social Entrepreneur
- Instruments: Vocals, Teaching of the Indian Traditional Arts
- Website: vidyasubramanian.com

Vidya Subramanian is a Carnatic style vocalist and educator. She is Founder of Vidya Subramanian Academy, a social enterprise focused on customized online teaching of Carnatic music and other traditional Indian artforms, languages, slokas and Yoga to students across the world. Vidya is a disciple of maestro Padmabhushan Lalgudi Sri Jayaraman. In addition to this, she is a Chartered accountant (National rank 2 in CA Final Exam), with an MBA from Boston College. Vidya Subramanian is an Aspen Global Fellow and Vital Voices Visionaries Fellow. She lives in Chennai, India.

== Awards ==
- Women Transforming India Award (2021) from NITI Aayog (award supported by United Nations - India, FICCI and various corporate partners
- Kalaimamani Award - 2018
- Champion of Chennai for Education (2022) from KSA Trust
- 2018 Homepreneur Award (Home professionals category))
- Thanjavur Kalyanaraman Endowment Award from Sri Krishna Gana Sabha (2011)
- Special Award from Sree Rama Seva Mandali, Bangalore (2011)
- 2010 Artist grant award from Saratoga Arts from New York State Council on the Arts (NYSCA) under the Saratoga Program for Arts Funding (SPAF)
- SOS Artist Grant from New York State Foundation for the Arts (NYFA) in 2009, 2010 and 2011
- 2009's Arts Grant award from the Town of Clifton Park's Arts and Culture Commission.

Vidya co-hosted a podcast series on Carnatic music called Raaga Rasika.
