= Madurai R. Muralidaran =

Composer, choreographer and playwright

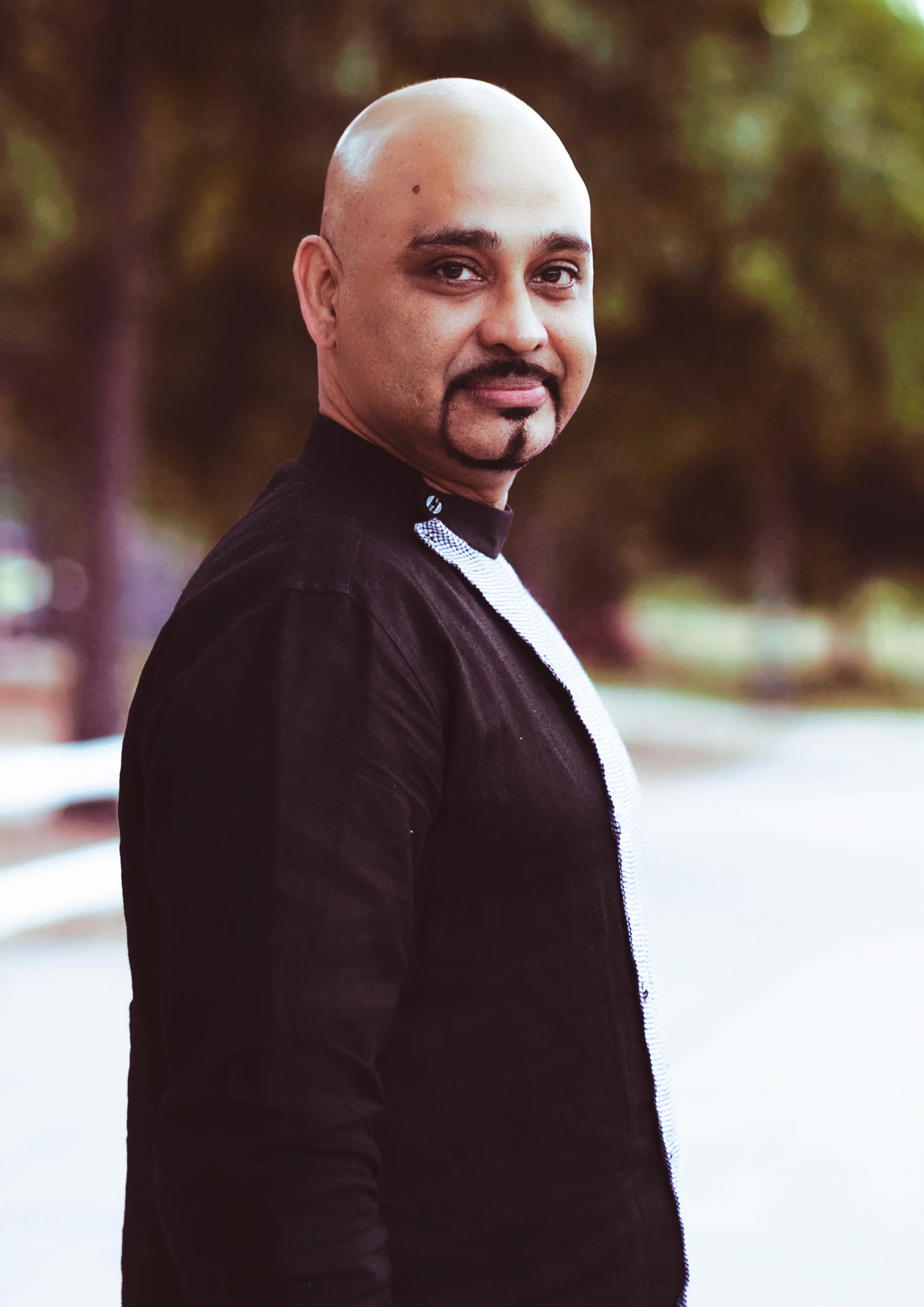
- Occupations: Dance Guru (teacher); composer; choreographer; dancer; lyricist; playwright; director
- Years active: 1978–present

Madurai R. Muralidaran is a dancer, composer, choreographer, writer, lyricist, playwright and director best known for his compositions for Bharatanatyam dancers and his elaborate dance musical productions.

== Biography ==
Madurai R. Muralidaran was initiated in the art of Bharatanatayam at age 7 under the guidance of Guru Kalaimamani Chamundeeswari (a senior disciple of Padmashree K.N.Dandayudapani Pillai). He has run Nrithyakshetra Dance Academy with his wife Smt. Chithra Muralidharan since 1978. He serves on the board of Alagappa Arts. He is Faculty at Aria University where he teaches nattuvangam.

Muralidaran received the Kalaimamani award from the Tamil Nadu state government for 2019. Kalaimamani is the highest civilian award in the state of Tamil Nadu. Bharath Kalachar gave him the title Kala Seva Bharathi for his contributions to the field of Indian performing arts, Kartik Fine Awards gave him the Kartik Award of Excellence in 2021 and Pothy's Parambara Classic Awards named him Parambara Noothana for his contributions to music composition and dance theatre. Muralidaran was given the lifetime achievement award 2022 by Abhai Association of Bharatanatayam Artistes of India. On January 22, 2023, Shri Muralidaran was conferred lifetime achievement award by Niruthia Nithyalaya of Chennai and Natyanjali Academy Association of Malaysia. On February 16, 2023 Muralidaran Sir was given the award Natya Achaarya Choodamani for his contribution to the arts from Puducherry Natyanjali Trust at their 17th year Maha Shivarathiri Festival.

Muralidaran earned Guinness, Asia and India Book of Records, for teaching 359 students an alarippu in Sankeerna Jaathi Dhruva Thalam in 2019, composing 25 Varnams in 25 days in 2020 and leading 125 dancers worldwide to present 50 unique jathis on a virtual platform in 2021. He composed, choreographed and taught 698 people a varnam on Tamil Annai (Mother Tamil), setting his third record in the Guinness Book of World Records, an effort which also raised Rs. 10 lakh for the Tamil Nadu Covid Relief Fund. Muralidaran organized a World Record Union record for the most people dancing with swords simultaneously (Hybrid) both online and in person with 1346 members at Jeppiaar University, Tamil Nadu (India) on 9 June 2024.

Muralidaran debuted as a lyricist for cine music with "Othaiyadi" on March 8, 2026. Muralidaran was honored by Niruthia Nithyalaya during the first edition of "Illangai Natya Sangamam" in collaboration with ICCR, High Commission of India, Colombo on May 19, 2026.

== Productions ==
Muralidaran's productions, incorporating both dance and drama, are based on both traditional Hindu mythology and stories from ancient and contemporary Tamil literature.

In November 2009, he debuted Silapathigaram, a production based on the Sangam Tamil epic by Ilango Adigal, and which has since been performed in the US to and New Zealand. He staged Amarar Kalki's historic thriller Sivakamiyin Sabadam in a 2013 production The Hindu said was a "zero-error show". His other large-scale productions include Yagnaseni (based on the story of Draupadi from the Mahabharatha), Avadhara Purushan (based on the Kamba Ramayana), and Yadhava Madhava (based on the story of Krishna). His production Karna, centered on the generous yet flawed anti-hero of the Mahabharata, which debuted in Chennai in April 2018.

Muralidaran has consistently been involved in helping raise funds for the organization Vision Aid, based in Boston, Massachusetts. His productions in support of Vision-Aid, Krishna (2009), Justice of the Anklet (2010), Slaying of the Demons (2012), The Dancer's Pledge (2014), The Iconic Avatar (2016), Charmer, Warrior, Guide (2017), Golden Armor, Golden Heart (2018), Invincible Spear (2019), The Seven Selfless Sovereigns (2021), The Jewel of Justice (2022), Vaayu Putra - The Son of the Wind (2023), Sivagami Shabadam: The Dancer's Pledge (2024), and Shakuntalam (2025) were received well by all in the area.

The Seven Selfless Sovereigns saw Muralidaran handling multiple aspects of production. He conceptualized the production, composed the music, wrote the lyrics, choreographed items, created all graphic design elements and visuals, and directed and edited the pieces. Again with The Jewel of Justice, Muralidaran handled all the aspects of production.

In 2022, Muralidaran returned to world tours after being unable to during pandemic. He conducted in person workshops around the USA and also presented some of his theatrical productions. In July 2022, his large scale Tamil Sangam poetry production was presented for FETNA at their convention in New York by high caliber dancers hand-picked by Muralidaran himself. These dancers including his senior disciples, students of teachers that had trained under his guidance, and students who have never met him in person but had been training intensely with him online. His well-known production, Karna, was presented in Texas in September, while the Tamil Sangam production had an encore presentation in Texas. In December 2022, Muralidaran staged his Tamil Sangam production at three major events in India - (1) Bharat Kalachar, (2) Tamil Tourism program, and (3) Karthik Fine Arts Center.

July 23, 2023 Muralidaran staged the premiere of his production, "Vaayu Putra - The Son of the Wind" in Littleton, MA to a packed audience. All praised the production for its dances, acting, visuals, and beyond. As with all his productions, Muralidaran himself handled all aspects of the production - music composition, lyrics, choreography, graphics/visuals, production and direction. He also played the titular character of Hanuman (aka Vaayu Putra). The show was then staged in Toronto, Canada as well as Edison, New Jersey. December 23, 2023 saw the staging of Vaayu Putra in Chennai at the Sir Mutha Venkatasubba Rao Concert Hall. The production had a full house despite being staged during the busy Marghazi season in Chennai, and ended with a standing ovation! Choreography and direction had been assisted by his wife, Smt. Chithra Muralidaran and daughter Kavya Muralidaran. Vaayu Putra was showcased successfully again in Chennai on January 6, 2024 under the auspices of Brahma Gana Sabha Mylapore, Chennai.

On July 21, 2024 Muralidaran staged "The Dancer's Pledge: The Saga of Shivagami" in Boston where he again teamed up with Vision Aid for an annual fundraiser for the charity. Muralidaran staged "Cosmic Rhythm: Journey Through Dasavatharam" in Ontario on August 17, 2024.

January 6, 2025 Muralidaran debuted his production "Soodi Kodutha Duarkodi" that was focused on Andal at Brahma Gana Sabha's Narada Gana Sabha main hall in Chennai. February 8, 2025 Muralidaran's new production "Sakuntalam - A Dance Musical" based on Kalidas' story of Shakuntala (from the epic Mahabharata) was presented in Chennai. Sakuntalam was a notable production for Muralidaran collaborating with the Budapest Live Orchestra. Noted dance magazine Sruti gave the production a good review saying "Muralidaran has meticulously crafted each segment of the dance musical with remarkable detail.".

Muralidaran was asked to present at FETNA again in North Carolina in 2025, where he debuted "Marudhiruvar" on 4 July 2025, a production inspired by the heroic history of the legendary Tamil warrior brothers, Marudhu Pandiyar, who rose against British forces in one of the earliest struggles for freedom. This production was later staged in Connecticut October 26, 2025. Marudhiruvar was showcased in Chennai on February 7, 2026 with a press launch on February 5, 2026. The Hindu featured regarding this show,

Shakuntala was staged December 31, 2025 as part of Abbas Cultural's 2025 Festival series and was conducted again at Brahma Gana Sabha on January 3, 2026 Rasika Ranjani Sabha (RR Sabha). Muralidaran's "Vaayu Putra" was included as part of Bharat Kalachar's 37th Margazhi Mahotsav 2025-2026 on January 9, 2026 Muralidaran's "Sri Krishna Leela" production was staged April 25 and April 26, 2026 in Melbourne, Australia. Muralidaran will be staging Marudhiruvar in the USA for Vision Aid as "Brothers in Arms: The Lions of Sivaganga" on July 26, 2026. "Saptatāla Laharī: A Grand Festival of the Seven Talas from the 35 Sulādi Sapta Tālas" was presented over 3 days in June 2026 featuring 7 full margams (Seven Pushpanjalis, Seven Alarippus, Seven Kavithuvams, Seven Jathiswarams, Seven Varnams, Seven Padams, and Seven Tillanas). "Prior to Saptatāla Laharī, Muralidharan had presented 19 margams in 19 different talas drawn from the Sapta Sulādi tala system. With the presentation of seven additional margams during this festival, the total will be 26 margams in 26 distinct talas."

== Notable compositions ==
Muralidaran has composed and released more than 120 audio albums exclusively for the field of Bharathanatyam. His dance music albums are used by Bharatha Natyam dancers worldwide. He composes both the music and lyrics for his pieces, which reflect innovations in thalam (rhythm patterns), ragam (melodies) and themes. In 2001 Muralidaran was recognized by the prominent Indian music and dance critic Subbudu for "ushering in a new era of composing varnams for the Bharatanatyam repertoire with new themes and... encompassing varied rhythmic cycles with matching lyrics."

=== Rhythmic repertoire ===
Having studied mridangam (percussion) in addition to his pursuit of Bharatha Natyam, Muralidharan compositions explore the nuances of rhythm theory. He plans to have composed full margams (repertoires) in all 35 thalams of the Carnatic Sooladhi Saptha thalam system by 2020, with margams in 20 unique thalams completed to date. After Sapta Taala Lahiri, the total number of margams made will be 26 margams in 26 distinct talas.

Since 2006, Muralidaran has composed several entire margams (traditional repertoires) in rare thalams, including Ashta Dasa Margam, composed in misra jati ata thalam, Akhanda Margam, composed in kanda jati ata thalam, and Nava Dhruvam, composed in sakeerna jati dhruva thalam, the longest thalam cycle with 29 aksharas.

Muralidaran has directed a number of dance festivals and record-setting performances. In 2018, Muralidaran highlighted his exploration of rhythm with a pair of dance festivals. In April 2018, his rhythm festival Chaturvidham presented four new margams each completely set to a rare thalam. The festival culminated with a massive live class with over 320 students learning the nattuvangam and choreography for an alarippu set to Sankeerna Jaathi Dhruva Thalam, the longest thalam in the Carnatic system. This class set Guinness, India Book and Asia Book records for the largest live Bharatha Natyam dance lesson. In November 2018, Muralidharan presented Dhimahi, a three-day dance festival described as "dynamic meditations on Laya" (rhythm), featuring new margams set to 5 more rare thalams. In addition, renown guest artistes Shobana, Lavanya Shankar, Parvathi Ravi Ghantasala, Anitha Guha, Uma Murali, Rukmini Vijayakumar and Srekala Bharath showcased choreography in their own styles for some of Muralidharan's other compositions.

=== Melodic repertoire ===
In addition to composing individual songs in all 35 thalams of the Carnatic Sooladhi Saptha thalam system, Muralidaran has also composed over 120 varnams, and jathswarams in all 72 Melakarata Ragas. Creating compositions in all 72 ragas is an accomplishment that Muralidharan shares with only one other, M. Balamuralikrishna. He likes to explore rare ragas in his compositions, such as Chandrajyoti, Ganamurthi, and Madhyamavati. .

=== Thematic repertoire ===
His unique compositions include a dance depicting daily life to the soundtrack of a heartbeat, a varnam on the Sun God (Surya), a shabdam on Jesus, a depiction of Krishna's dance upon the five-headed snake Kalinga, kauthuvams on Mother and Father, a keerthanam on the Indian Independence movement and pieces on women's empowerment. His compositions are used frequently by Bharatha Natyam dancers of different styles and from diverse regions. He has written a number of new compositions in the kauthuvam style, including ones in praise of the Hindu deities Nandi, Ayyappan and Venkateswara.

Muralidharan's thematic repertoires include Sri Anjeneyam, which centers on the stories of Lord Hanuman and Nayaka, which explores the different roles in life for males from boyhood through adult.

== Key Titles ==
Amongst his many awards, below are some of the most notable titles garnered by Muralidaran for his excellence in the arts and theater.

- Kalaimamani Award (2019) - from Tamil Nadu state government
- Kala Seva Bharathi (2018-2019) - from Bharath Kalachar
- Kartik Award of Excellence (2021) - from Kartik Fine Awards
- Mayura Nrithya Sagaram (2022)
- Natya Sadhanai Chemmal (2022) - from Abhai Association of Bharatanatyam Artistes of India
- Kalai Chemmal (2022) - from Sangamam Global Academy
- Lifetime Achievement Award (2022) - from Abhai Association of Bharatanatayam Artistes of India
- Lifetime Achievement Award (2023) - from Niruthia Nithyalaya of Chennai and Natyanjali Academy Association of Malaysia
- Natya Achaarya Choodamani (2023) - from Puducherry Natyanjali Trust
- Narkali Nayagan (2023) - from Niruthya Kalanjali Academy of Fines
- Nruthya Surabhi (2023) - Surabhi Awards Bangalore
- Natana RASA Maamani" (2025) - Kaalaa Rasa Mahotsavam
- Lifetime Achievement Award (2026) - from Indian Art and Culture Association (USA)
- 25 Years of Cultural Legacy USA (2026) - from Bharati Tamil Sangam (USA)

== World Records ==
Below is a list of the records held by Muralidaran.

=== Asia Book of World Records ===
- April 1, 2018 - "The Largest Bharatanatayam Dance Lesson"
- January 31, 2021 - "Maximum Participants Performing Bharatanatyam jatis (50 jatis) on Virtual Platform"
- May 23, 2021 - "25 Varnams Composed in 25 Days"
- October 10, 2021 - "Bharatanatyam Jathis performed online by dancers for the longest duration"

=== Guinness Book of World Records ===
- April 1, 2018 - "The Largest Bharatanatayam Dance Lesson"
- April 18, 2021 - "Most people in an online video relay performing a choreographed dance."
- August 1, 2021 - "Most people performing a choreographed dance online simultaneously"

=== India Book of World Records ===
- April 1, 2018 - "The Largest Bharatanatayam Dance Lesson"
- January 31, 2021 - "Maximum Participants Performing Bharatanatyam jatis (50 jatis) on Virtual Platform"
- May 23, 2021 - "25 Varnams Composed in 25 Days"
- October 10, 2021 - "Bharatanatyam Jathis performed online by dancers for the longest duration"

=== World Records Union ===
- October 10, 2021 - "Bharatanatyam Jathis performed online by dancers for the longest duration"
- June 9, 2024 - "Largest number of swords in hand as a tribute to the first woman freedom fighter Rani Velunaachiyaar"
