= Thanjavur R. Ramamoorthy =

Indian musical artist (1929–2019)

R. Ramamoorthy தஞ்சாவூர் ர.ராமமூர்த்தி

Background information
- Born: 15 June 1929
- Died: 22 June 2019 (aged 90) Tiruchirappalli
- Genre: Carnatic music – Indian Classical Music
- Occupations: Retd. Grade-I Artist, All India Radio, Tiruchirappalli, Tamil Nadu
- Instrument: Mirudhangam

Tanjavur R. Ramamoorthy (தஞ்சாவூர் ர.ராமமூர்த்தி) (15 June 1929 - 22 June 2019) was a vidwan in Indian classical music, playing Carnatic music on the mridangam, an ancient Indian percussion instrument. The mridangam is the primary rhythmic accompaniment in a Carnatic music ensemble, and in the Dhrupad genre, where it is known as a pakhawaj.

== Early life and training ==
Ramamoorthy was born to a famous violinist, R. Rathinam Pillai and Krishnammal.

In 1938 he entered into gurukulavasam under Brahmarshi Biravam Pillai at the age of 9 and was trained under "Thanjavur style". His miruthangam arangetram was held in 1941. His guru allowed him to participate in Kacheries / programmes with mirudhangam accompaniment. During those times Brahmarshi Biravam Pillai brought him to the famous miruthangha vidwan Brahmarshi Vaidyanatha Iyer of Thanjavur and requested to allow him to enter into his Gurukulam (school) where he was trained further in the "Thanjavur Style". Thanjavur R. Ramamoorthy, Palghat Mani Iyer, T. K. Moorthy are the notable disciples of Vaidyanatha Iyer. Vaidyanatha Iyer was staying at Trivandrum while joining his school, hence he learnt developments in miruthangam at Trivandram under him and he was directed to participate some Kacheries / programmes and he participated in AIR programmes once in three months.

From 1943 he had chains of programmes and every Kachery/music programme which will have mridhangam accompaniment of Palghat Mani Iyer (Padma Bhusan Awardee -1971), Palani Subramaniam Pillai and himself. All the top artists of the time liked and requested his mridhangam accompaniment in their programmes by considering him with Genius Palghat Mani Iyer and Palani Subramania Pillai. While this being his career outside Brahmarshi G. D. Sastri, the then station director of All India Radio Trichy, requested him in writing to join as artist of AIR and he has joined All India Radio, Trichy as per the directions of his gurunathar.

== Honours ==
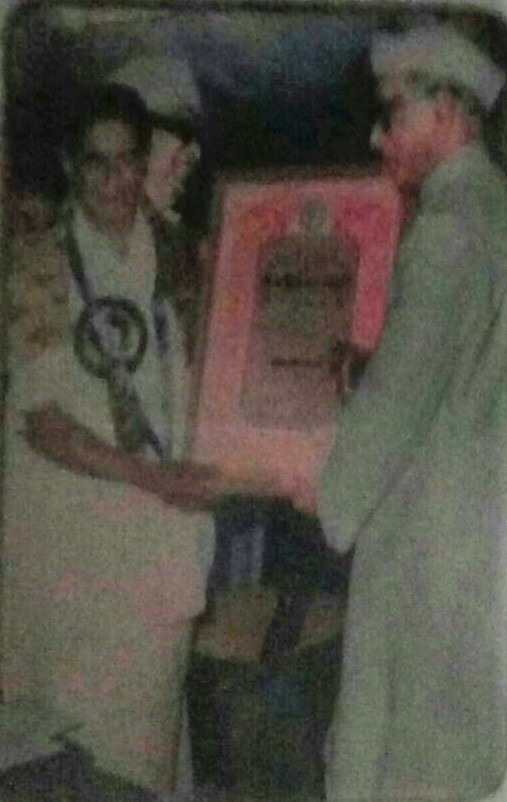
Governor of Tamil Nadu Sadiqq Ali confers Kalaimamani title in 1980 to Thanjavur Ramamoorthy, behind is MG Ramachandran Chief Minister of Tamil Nadu

- On 26 January 1980, Received title of Kalaimamani Award by the Government of Tamil Nadu, which is the highest state honour in the field of Arts
- On 19 June 1983 the Karaikudi Tamil Isai Sangam conferred a title "Isai Kadal".
- From 1983 to 1985 he served as an examination committee member at Annamalai University, Chidambaram for awarding the Sangeetha Bhusan Degree.
- On 16 May 1989, All India Radio Trichy honored him to receive the Golden Jubilee edition during its Golden Jubilee celebrations in the capacity of Senior Artist.
- During 1989 he has been categorized under Grade-I Artist as the first man in All India Radio Service on the verge of retirement. On one occasion Rotary Club of Trichy honored his service in All India Radio.
- In 1990 the Madurai Mahadeva Asthami Committee honored him for his 50 years of service to the Music field and special handling of Mridhangam.
- On 1 April 1994, the Maharajapuram Viswanatha Iyer Trust Chennai honored him as Senior Artist.
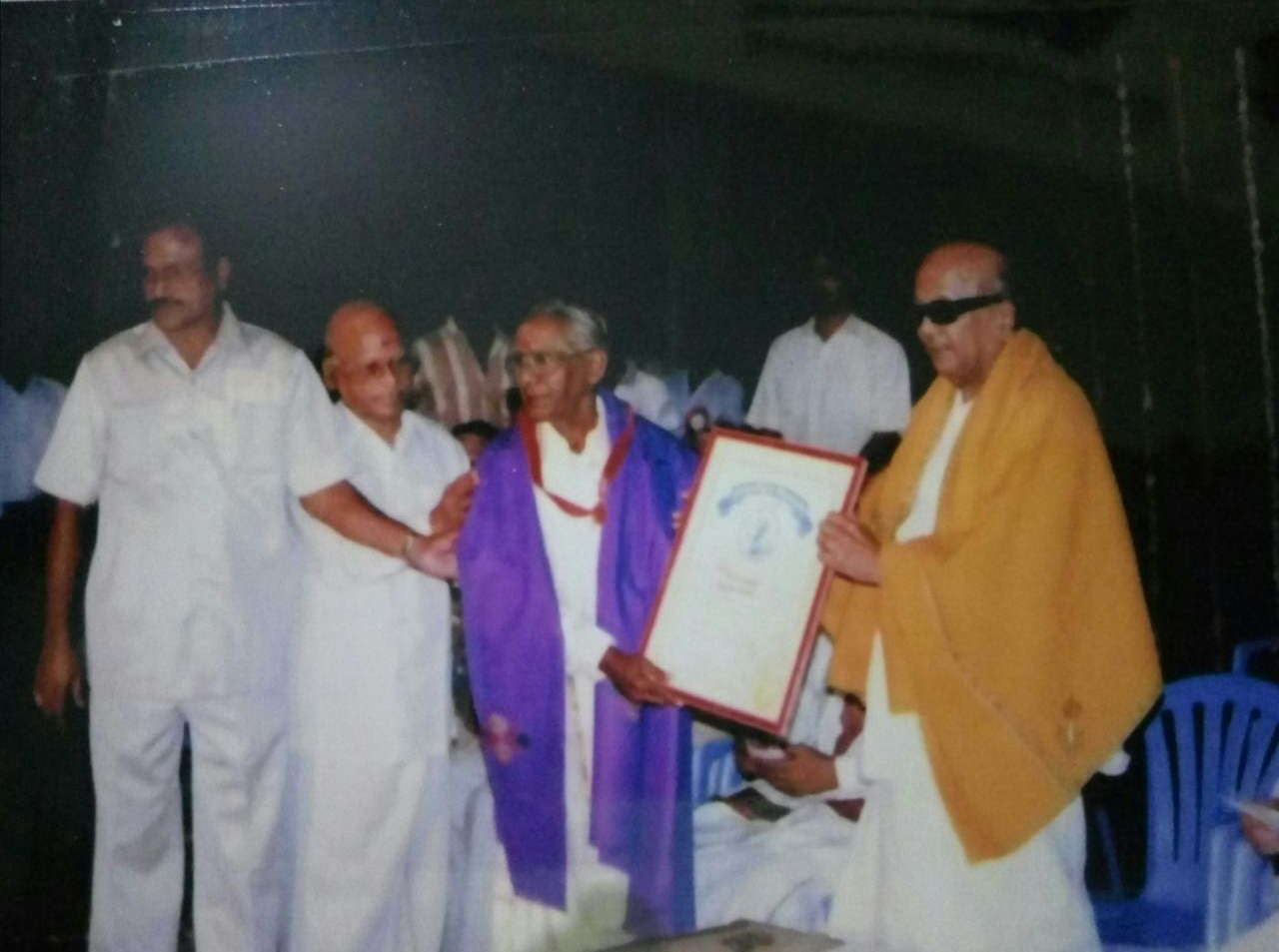
  Muthamilperavai award MIRUTHANGA SELVAM title conferred by former Chief Minister of Tamil Nadu Dr. M. Karunanidhi in 1993
- On 9 February 1997, Muthamil Peravai of Chennai conferred a title "Miruthangha Selvam" by Honorable Chief Minister of Tamil Nadu Dr. M. Karunanidhi with a gold medal.
- Trichy District Nalla Nidhi Committee has awarded "Kalai Peroli" (title on 8.6.2001) under the Presidency of District Collector V. Moorthy.
- On 31 January 2002, Shri Sathguru Thiagabramma Trust & Shri Sathguru Sabha conferred on him a title "Laya Vathya Rathnam" with gold medal.
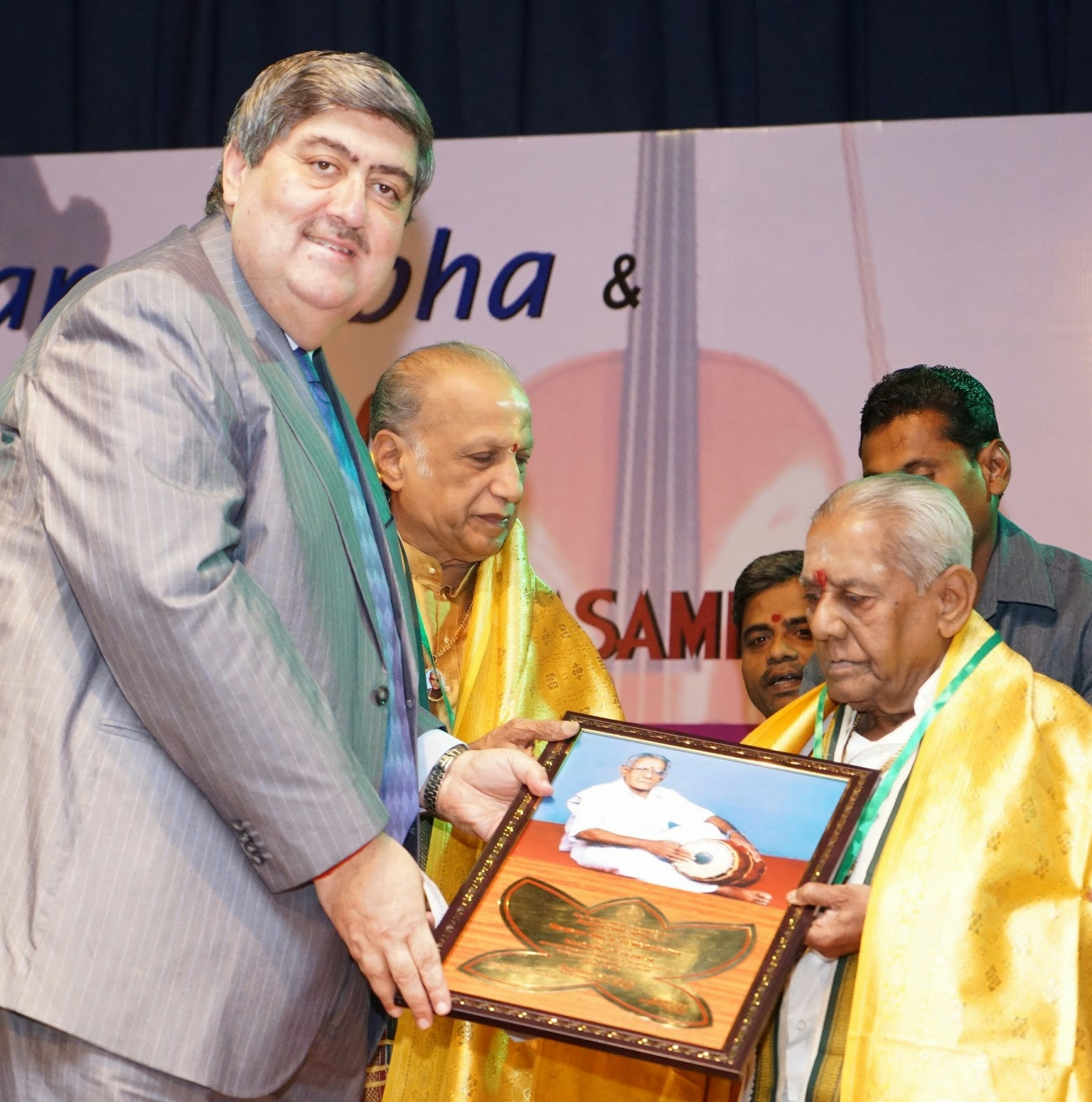
  "Vaadhya Padmam" conferred by the Brahma Gana Sabha
  A recognition of the long service in the Carnatic Music held at Tiruppur during the Palani Subramania Pillai Memorial Music Function held during 22.11.2002 to 24.11.2002.
- On 3 December 2014, he received the title "Vaadhya Padmam" conferred by the Brahma Gana Sabha, Chennai during the inauguration of its December Art Festival 2014.
- On 28 January 2018 he was presented with the TCM Lifetime Achievement Award during the sixth annual day celebrations of Trichy Carnatic Musicians (TCM), a group of young musicians of the city.

== Career in All India Radio (AIR) ==
He was appointed Artist of All India Radio by the British Government on 5 September 1945. He served under British Government up to 1947, and 42 years in Indian Government as a mridhangam artist. In 1946 he accompanied vocal programmes of the great vidwans Papanasam Sivan, Thiruvaduthurai T. N. Rajarathinam Pillai. Subsequently, All India Radio preferred a method of categorising the artists in various grades through a panel committee in 1950. He has been chosen into the "A" Grade Artist by the first panel committee.

- On 11 March 1950 he has accompanied with mridhangam to a vocal concert by Sathoor A. G. Subramania Iyer in an "External Service" programme recording on special request from All India Radio, New Delhi.
- On 3 July 1951 while Balamurali Krishna (Padmashri Awardee - 1971, PadmaVibhusan Awardee - 1991) accompanied with viola to G. N. Balasubramaniam (Guruji of M. L. Vasanthakumari-(Padmashri Awardee - 1967)) a genius in vocal, he has accompanied with mridhangam, at Chennai on special invitation for a national programme from All India Radio, Chennai.
- On 4 July 1951 he has accompanied Balamurali Krishna Viola-solo at AIR Chennai as per the special request of Balamurali Krishna. (Padmashri Awardee-1971)
- On 12 February 1960 he has accompanied Voleti Venkateswaralu a vocalist at Vijayawada in a Sangeetha Sammelan programme.
- On 12 November 1961 he has accompanied Trichy Swaminatha Iyer for his vocal concert in a Sangeetha Sammelan Programme at Bangalore.
- On 8 November 1963 he accompanied Madurai S. Somasundaram (Padmashri Awardee-1976), a famous vocalist for a Sangeetha Sammelan Programme at Trichy.
- On 9 April 1966 he accompanied Chithoor Subramania Pillai familiar vocalist (Guruji of Madurai S. Somasundaram) in a national Programme at New Delhi on a specific request from the AIR New Delhi.
- On 12 August 1973 accompanied flute concert of H. Ramachandra Sastri at Chennai All India Radio on special invitation.
- On 29 November 1975 he accompanied with Mridhangam to V. R. Kedharanathan, Vocalist in a Sangeetha Sammelan Programme.
- During 1975 he accompanied with single mridhangam for a Trio Violin Solo by Dr. L. Vaidhyanathan.(Padmashri Awardee-1989), Dr. L. Sankar, Dr. L. Subramaniam in a special programme at All India Radio, Trichy.
- On 15 November 1990 he accompanied on mridhangam in a Sangeetha Sammelan programme at Vijayawada to Angammali Shri. Jose.
- Organised ‘Thani Avarthanam’ and ‘Layakolam’ programmes (i.e.) mridhangam solos in rare and critical Thalas. One recognition of his Layakolam is published in ‘Akashwani’ issue dated 23.3.1980.

== Collaboration with other notable musicians ==
He has accompanied notable musicians including the Bharat Ratna awardee M. S. Subbulakshmi, D. K. Pattammal, K. B. Sundarambal, M. L. Vasanthakumari, Ariyakudi Ramanuja Iyengar, Madurai Mani Iyer, the Alathur Brothers, Padma Vibhushan awardee Dr.M.Balamurali Krishna, M. K. Thyagaraja Bhagavathar, C. S. Jayaraman, Sirkazhi Govindarajan, T. M. Soundararajan and K. J. Yesudas.

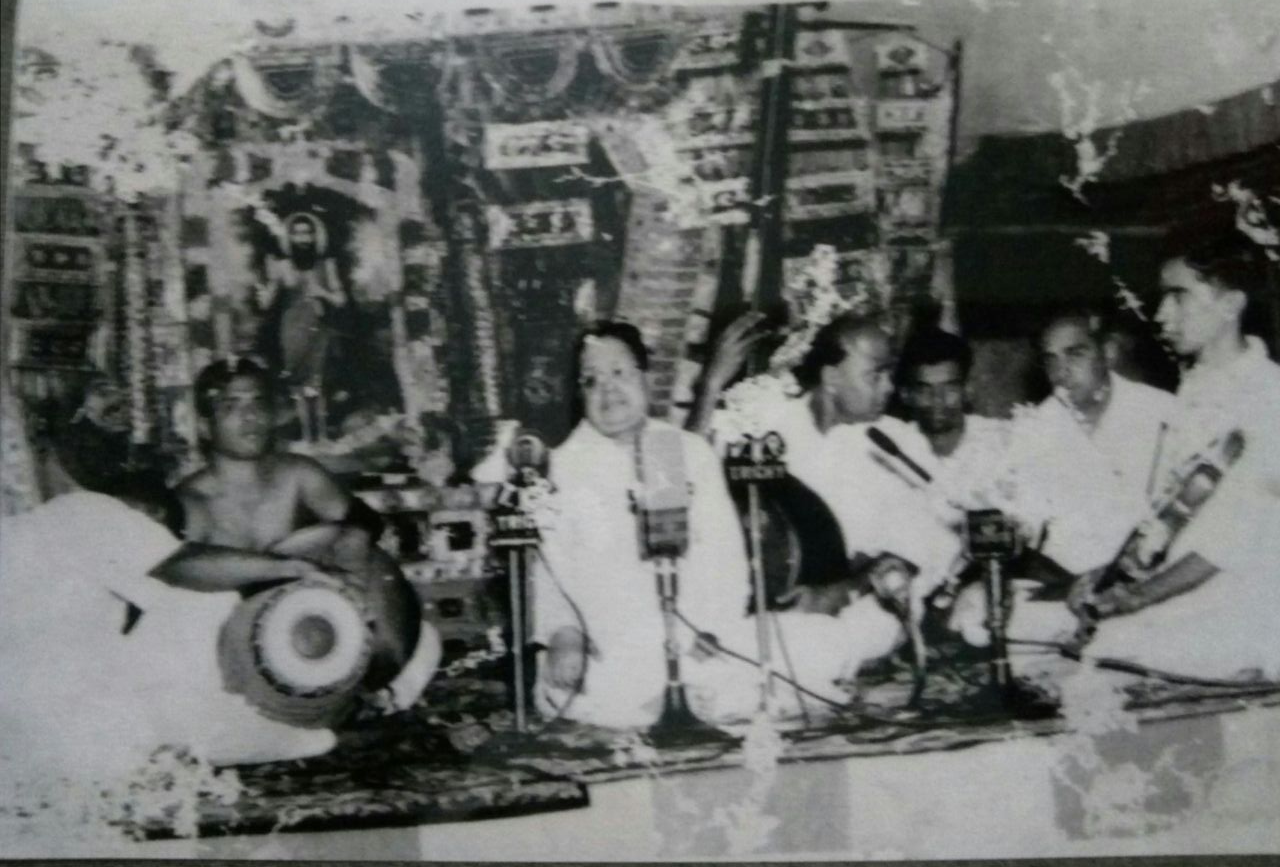
Kalaimamani Thanjavur R. Ramamoorthy-Mridhangam, Madurai Mani Iyer-Vocal, Lalgudy Jeyaraman-Violin

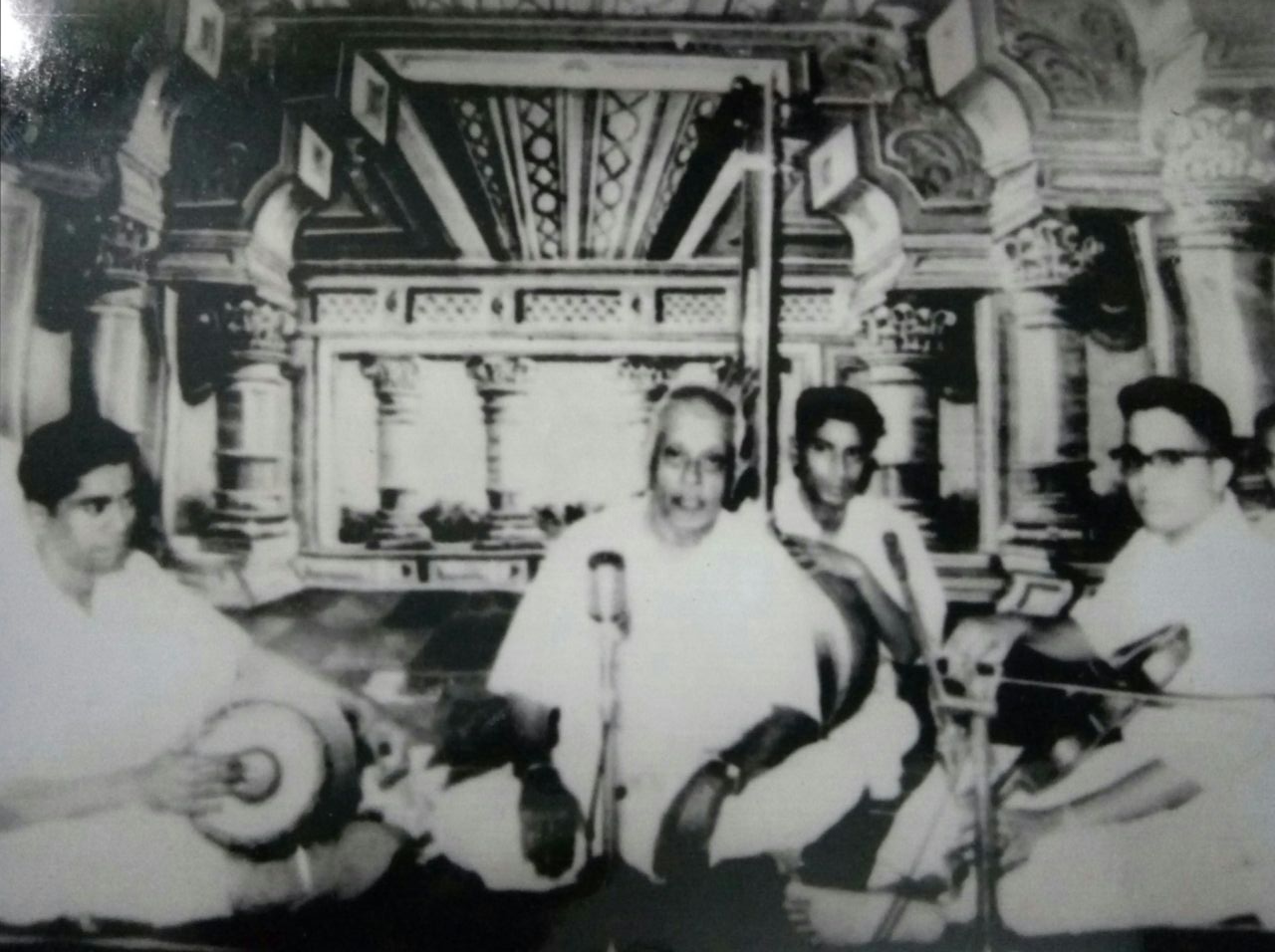
Thanjavur R. Ramamoorthy Mridhangam, Ariyakudi Ramanuja Iyenkar Vocal, T. N. Krishnan Violin

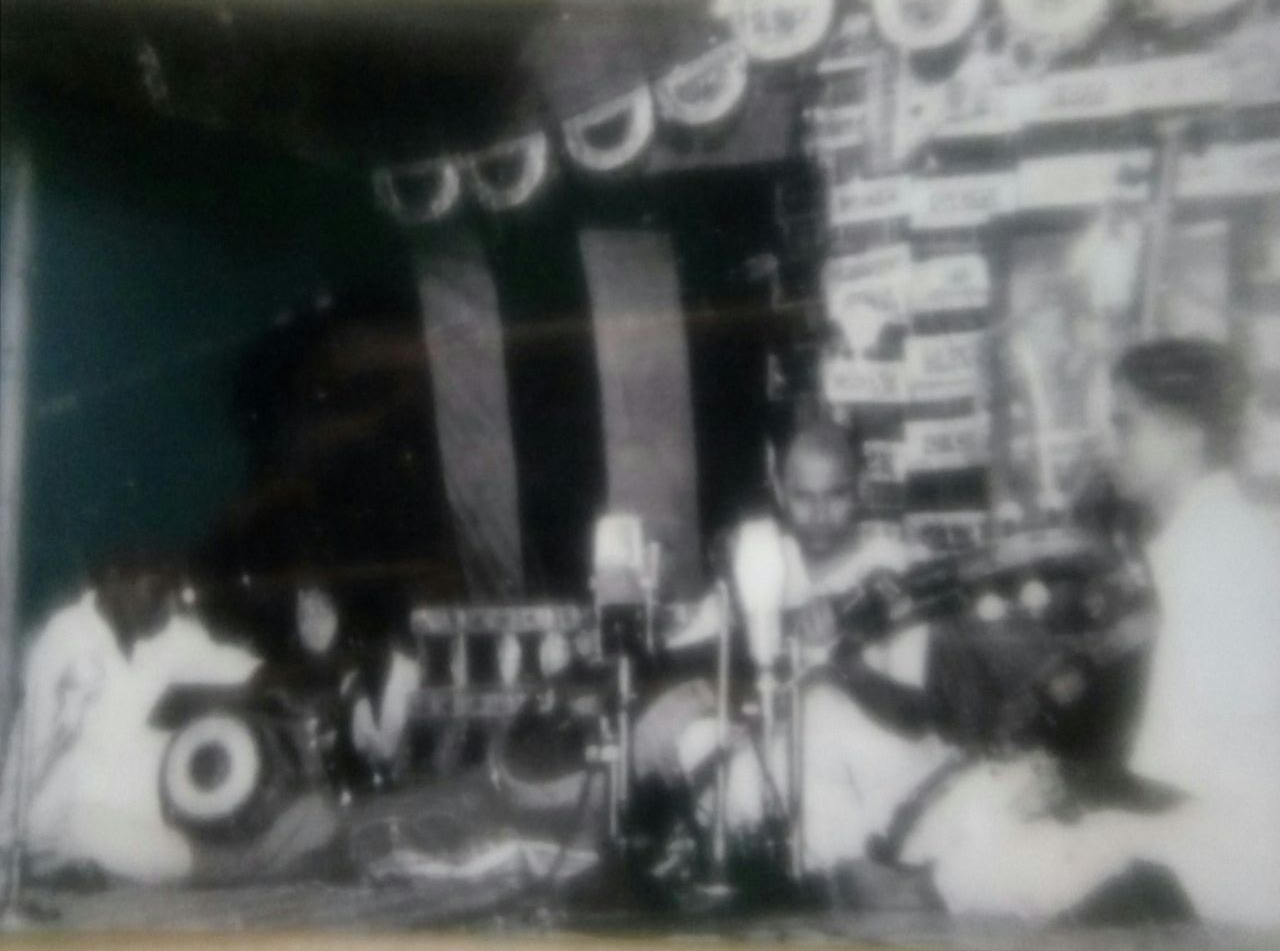
Thanjavur R. Ramamoorthy-Mridangam, S. Balachander-Veenai, Lalgudy Jeyaraman-violin

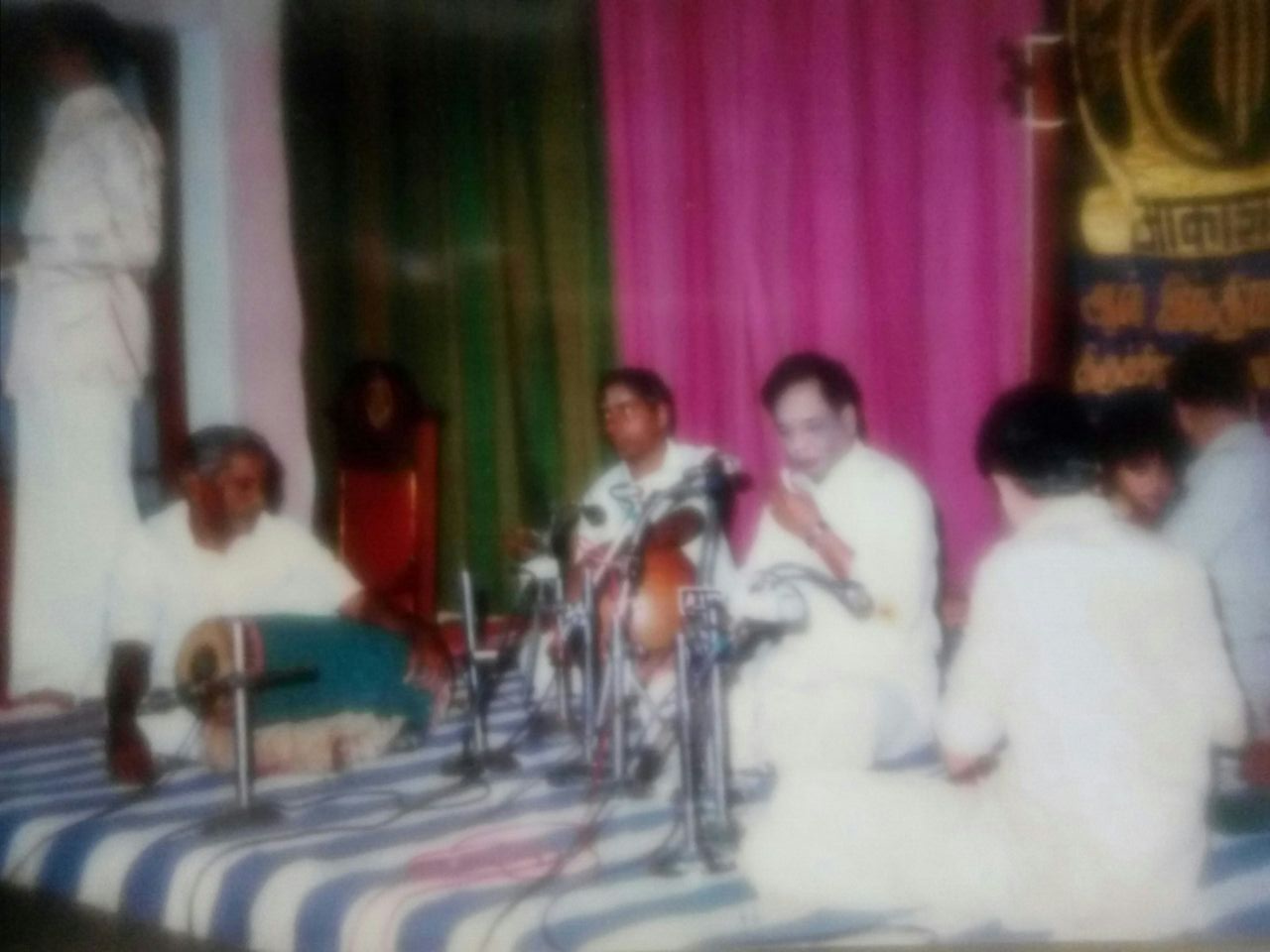
Thanjavur R. Ramamoorthy -Mridangam, Balamirali Krishna-violin
