= Rajeswari Sainath =

Indian Bharatanatyam dancer

- Born: Hyderabad, India
- Occupations: Bharatanatyam dancer, choreographer
- Children: Vyshnavie Sainath
- Awards: Kalaimamani (2018)

Rajeswari Sainath is an Indian Bharatanatyam dancer and choreographer based in Hyderabad, India. She is known for her performances and choreography, often collaborating with her daughter, Vyshnavie Sainath. Sainath has been recognized for her contributions to Indian classical dance, receiving the Kalaimamani award from the Tamil Nadu government in 2018.

== Early life and training ==
Rajeswari Sainath was born in Hyderabad, India. She began her Bharatanatyam training under Guru Indra Rajan and later continued her studies with other notable teachers. She developed an interest in rhythmic compositions and has worked with percussionists, including the late mridangam maestro Karaikudi Mani. Her training emphasized the mathematical precision of rhythms in Bharatanatyam, which influenced her choreography.

== Career ==
Sainath performs traditional Bharatanatyam recitals, adhering to the margam format, which includes a sequence of items such as pushpanjali, varnam, and tillana. She has also choreographed and performed Bharatanatyam ballets, including Sri Lalitha Vaibhavam, Rajsimha (based on Lord Narasimha), and productions tracing the river Godavari. One of her ballets focused on environmental themes, highlighting the importance of rivers. These works often incorporate complex rhythmic patterns, such as the khanda jati triputa tala, showcasing her focus on rhythm in dance.

Her performances combine traditional techniques with thematic narratives. For example, her ballet Ode to the River was presented as a tribute to the river Godavari, combining dance with storytelling. Sainath has performed at various cultural festivals and venues, including events organized by the Sri Krishna Gana Sabha.

Sainath frequently collaborates with her daughter, Vyshnavie Sainath, who is also a Bharatanatyam dancer. Their joint performances maintain the traditional structure of Bharatanatyam recitals. In addition to performing, Sainath teaches Bharatanatyam, emphasizing both technique and expression in her training approach.

== Awards and recognition ==
In 2018, Sainath was honored with the Kalaimamani award by the Tamil Nadu government for her contributions to Bharatanatyam. She has also been acknowledged for her performances at national and international dance festivals.

== Personal life ==
Rajeswari Sainath resides in Hyderabad with her family. Her daughter, Vyshnavie Sainath, is a Bharatanatyam dancer and often performs alongside her.
