= Suma Sudhindra =

Indian classical musician

Kalaimamani Suma Sudhindra
- Born: India
- Origin: Karnataka, India
- Genre: Carnatic music
- Occupations: Musician, instrumentalist, veena
- Instrument: Veena
- Award: Kalaimamani Award (1994)
- Website: www.sumasudhindra.co.in

Suma Sudhindra is a classical musician and veena exponent from India, in the Carnatic Music genre. She was awarded Karnataka's second highest civilian award, the Rajyotsava Award, in the year 2001.

== Early days and personal life ==
She was trained by her gurus vidhwan Raja Rao and vidhwan Chitti Babu.

She is based in Bangalore. Her spouse is a dentist and she has two daughters. She is an avid bonsai collector.

== Career ==
She has the Chittibabu style known for the melodic sounds of the Veena. She has widely toured and given performances in United States, the United Kingdom, Singapore and Malaysia. She has also led numerous veena ensembles over the years.

=== Carnatic-Jazz ===
She has rendered numerous fusion performances along with Dutch Jazz group Spinifex for many years.

=== Other initiatives ===
Suma serves as Director of Outreach for the Indian Music Experience (IME), an interactive music museum based in India.

She co-founded the Artists’ Introspective Movement (AIM) along with kuchipudi danseuse Veena Murthy Vijay. AIM organizes the Bangalore International Arts Festival (BIAF) since 2007. BIAF is a cultural platform for artists.

== Awards & felicitations ==
- 1994: Received title of Kalaimamani Award by the Government of Tamil Nadu, which is the highest state honour in the field of Arts
- 2001: Received Karnataka Rajyotsava Award
