= Tiruchi S. Swaminatha Iyer =

Indian Carnatic singer and scholar

Tiruchi Swaminathan Iyer
- Born: 1 December 1910 (age 115); India
- Died: 1998
- Occupation: Carnatic Vocal
- Awards: Kalaimamani Award (1987)

Tiruchi Swaminathan Iyer (1 December 1910 - 1998) was a Carnatic vocal singer and scholar. Tiruchi S. Swaminatha Iyer (1910–1998) was an eminent Carnatic music vocalist, scholar, and revered teacher known for his expertise in rendering rare compositions of Saint Tyagaraja.

== About ==
He was born in 1910 in the city of Tiruchirappalli in the state of Tamil Nadu, South India. He learned music from his father Thiruvayar Subrahmanya Iyer. He gave his first concert at Thiruvisalur Ayyaval Utsavam held near Kumbakonam in 1926. Since then he has given many musical performances. He is famous for singing rare works of Tyagaraja. His grand father Orappalli Ayya Bhagavathar was a direct disciple of Saint Tyagaraja. Besides singing vocal music, he took up a career as a music instructor. He taught music to many disciples.

== Awards ==
- 1987 : Received title of Kalaimamani Award by the Government of Tamil Nadu, which is the highest state honour in the field of Arts.
- 1993 : Awarded Sangeet Natak Akademi Award in the field of Music for his contribution to carnatic Vocal Music.
