= Geetha Rajashekar =

Sundar Geetha Rajashekar
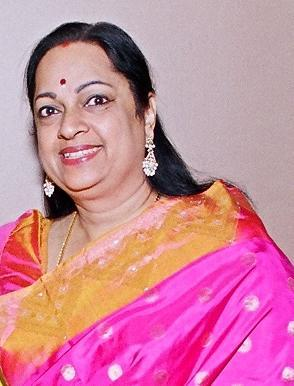

Background information
- Born: Sundar Geetha Rajashekar
- Origin: Chennai, Tamil Nadu, India
- Genre: Carnatic music – Indian Classical Music
- Occupation: Singer

Sundar Geetha Rajashekar is a Carnatic singer from Chennai, Tamil Nadu, India. She is an All India Radio (AIR) and Doordarshan artiste. She is on the panel of artistes selected by the Indian Council for Cultural Relations (ICCR), New Delhi.

== Career ==
Geetha Rajashekar started learning Carnatic music at an early age in New Delhi and completed her studies under Sangeetha Kalanidhi Smt and D.K. Pattammal.

She has travelled extensively within India and abroad for concerts, and has been on tour to the US, Canada, Malaysia, Australia, Singapore, Dubai, Abu Dhabi and London. Several of her performances have been recorded.

She is the "Founder Trustee" of the Ragalaya Trust, dedicated to the cause of Carnatic Music. She teaches Carnatic music at her own school, Madhura Geetham, in Chennai, with a branch in Toronto Canada where she goes on teaching assignments every year during the summer. She is also a visiting guest professor at Annamalai University Canada Campus.

=== Awards and honors ===
- 2006: Received title of Kalaimamani Award by the Government of Tamil Nadu, which is the highest state honour in the field of Arts.
- Awarded the titles of "Isai Maamani", "Naadha Bhushani", "Bala Rathna" and "Isai Selvam", the latter conferred by the Chief Minister of Tamil Nadu.
- Won prizes from the Music Academy, Shri Krishna Gana Sabha, and The Indian Fine Arts Society during their Annual Music Festivals.

== Personal life ==
Geetha Rajashekar is married to SS Rajashekar, son of former union minister Chidambaram Subramaniam, and currently resides in Chennai, Tamil Nadu, India.
