= Roja Kannan =

Indian dancer

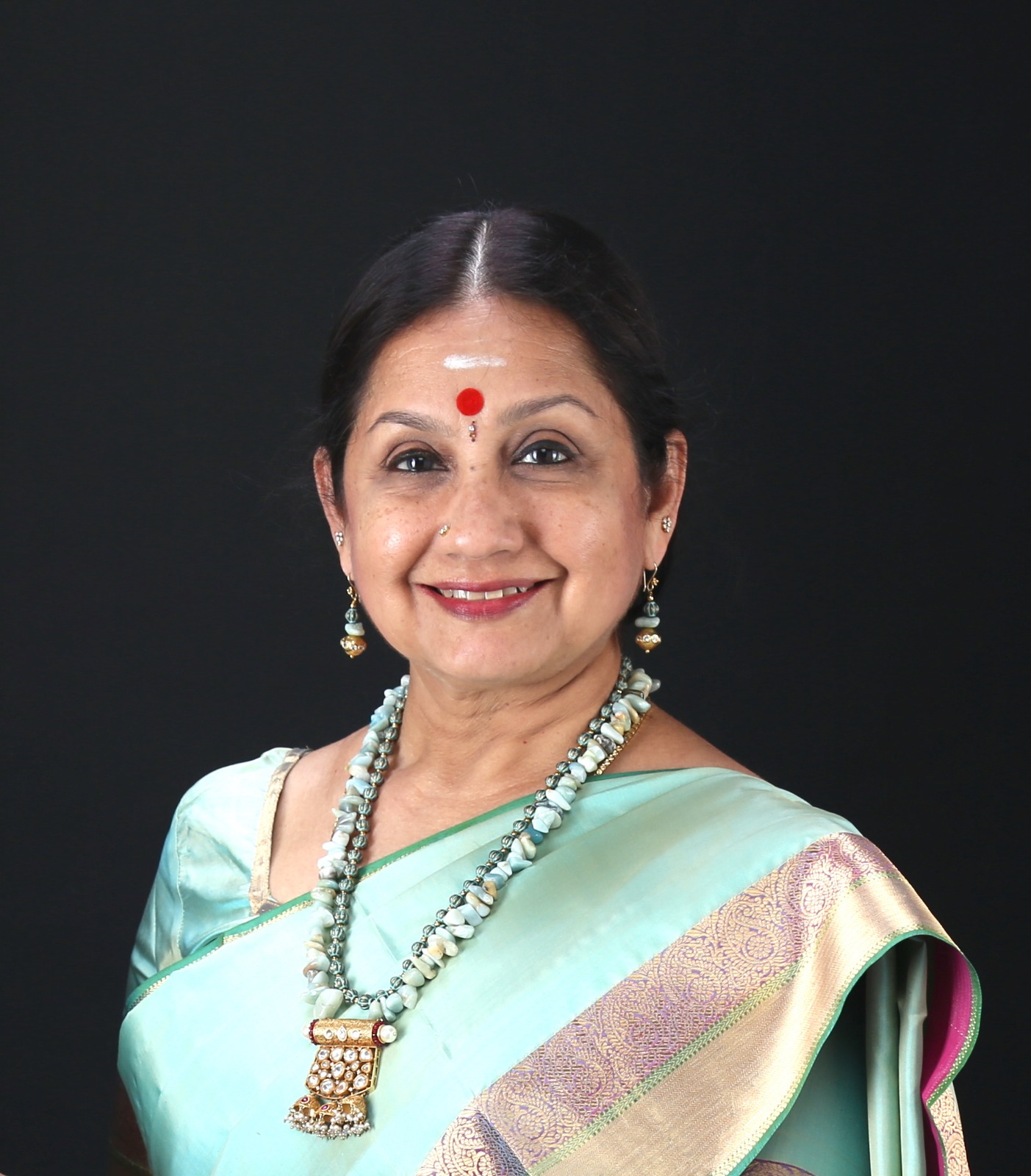
- Occupations: dancer, choreographer, teacher
- Known for: Bharatanatyam
- Relatives: Palghat Rama Bhagavathar

Roja Kannan (born 1959 or 1960) is an Indian dancer specialising in the classical dance form Bharatanatyam.

Kannan trained in Bharatanatyam under the dancers Adyar K. Lakshman and Kalanidhi Narayanan. She performed an arangetram in 1972. She stopped performing following her marriage. This hiatus lasted for 13 years.

Kannan founded a dance school, Bharatha Natyalaya, in 1987. She was awarded the Kalaimamani for 2017 and the Sangeet Natak Akademi Award for 2025.

In 2012 Kannan was based in Alwarpet, Chennai.
