= Lakshmi Viswanathan =

Indian dancer (1944–2023)

- Born: 12 January 1944; Bangalore, Kingdom of Mysore, British India (now in Karnataka, India)
- Died: 20 January 2023 (aged 79); Chennai, Tamil Nadu, India
- Occupations: Bharatanatyam dancer, choreographer, teacher, writer
- Parent(s): K. Viswanathan (Father) & Alamelu (Mother)
- Awards: Sangeet Natak Akademi Award (2008) Nritya Kalanidhi (2011)

Lakshmi Viswanathan (12 January 1944 – 20 January 2023) was an Indian Bharatanatyam dancer, choreographer, teacher, and writer. She received the Sangeet Natak Akademi Award for Bharatanatyam in 2008 and the Nritya Kalanidhi title from the Madras Music Academy in 2011.

== Early life and training ==
Lakshmi Viswanathan was born on 12 January 1944 in Bangalore, Kingdom of Mysore, British India, to Alamelu and K. Viswanathan. Her family was associated with the classical arts and the Thanjavur tradition. She began training in Bharatanatyam under Kausalya of the Vazhuvoor Ramaiya Pillai school and later studied under Kanchipuram Ellappa Pillai. She also trained with Courtalam Ganesa Pillai and Sankari Krishnan of the Thanjavur Kittappa Pillai school.Viswanathan studied music under her mother and later under Tedyiyur Narayanaswami, Thiruvaiyyaru Krishnamurthy, and T. Mukta. Her arangetram took place in 1952 and was presided over by E. Krishna Iyer, founder-secretary of the Music Academy, Madras.

== Career ==
Lakshmi Viswanathan emerged as a leading exponent of Bharatanatyam, performing extensively in India and abroad. Her performances were noted for their elegance, expressive abhinaya (gesture-based storytelling), and innovative choreography. She was a regular performer at major cultural festivals, including the Khajuraho Dance Festival, which she described as a "dream-come-true experience," and the Music Academy’s annual dance festival in Chennai. In addition to her performances, Viswanathan was a respected guru who trained numerous students, emphasizing the importance of individuality and creativity within the traditional framework of Bharatanatyam. She also authored books and articles on dance, including reflections on its historical and cultural significance. Her dance was known for its in-depth research, blending tradition with scholarly insight. Contributions and style Viswanathan’s work was deeply influenced by the feminine aspects of Bharatanatyam, often exploring themes of grace, strength, and emotional depth. Her choreography was praised for its musicality, drawing inspiration from Carnatic compositions and the works of figures like M.S. Subbulakshmi, to whom she paid tribute through her art. Her multifaceted approach—combining performance, teaching, and writing—earned her recognition as a cultural ambassador of Indian dance.

== Awards and recognition ==
Lakshmi Viswanathan received numerous accolades during her career.She expressed surprise and humility at receiving such honors, noting her focus remained on the art itself.

- 1992: Received title of Kalaimamani Award by the Government of Tamil Nadu, which is the highest state honour in the field of Arts.
- 2008: Honored with the Sangeet Natak Akademi Award for her contributions to Bharatanatyam.
- 2011: Conferred the Nritya Kalanidhi title by the Madras Music Academy, a prestigious recognition in the Indian classical dance community.

== Personal life and legacy ==
Viswanathan was known for her deep connection to Chennai, where she lived and worked for most of her life. She died on 20 January 2023, leaving behind a legacy celebrated by the dance community and beyond. Her contributions were lauded for their timeless quality, with tributes highlighting her role as a keeper of Bharatanatyam’s traditions while adapting it to contemporary sensibilities.
