= Kalaimamani =

Highest civilian award in the state of Tamil Nadu, India

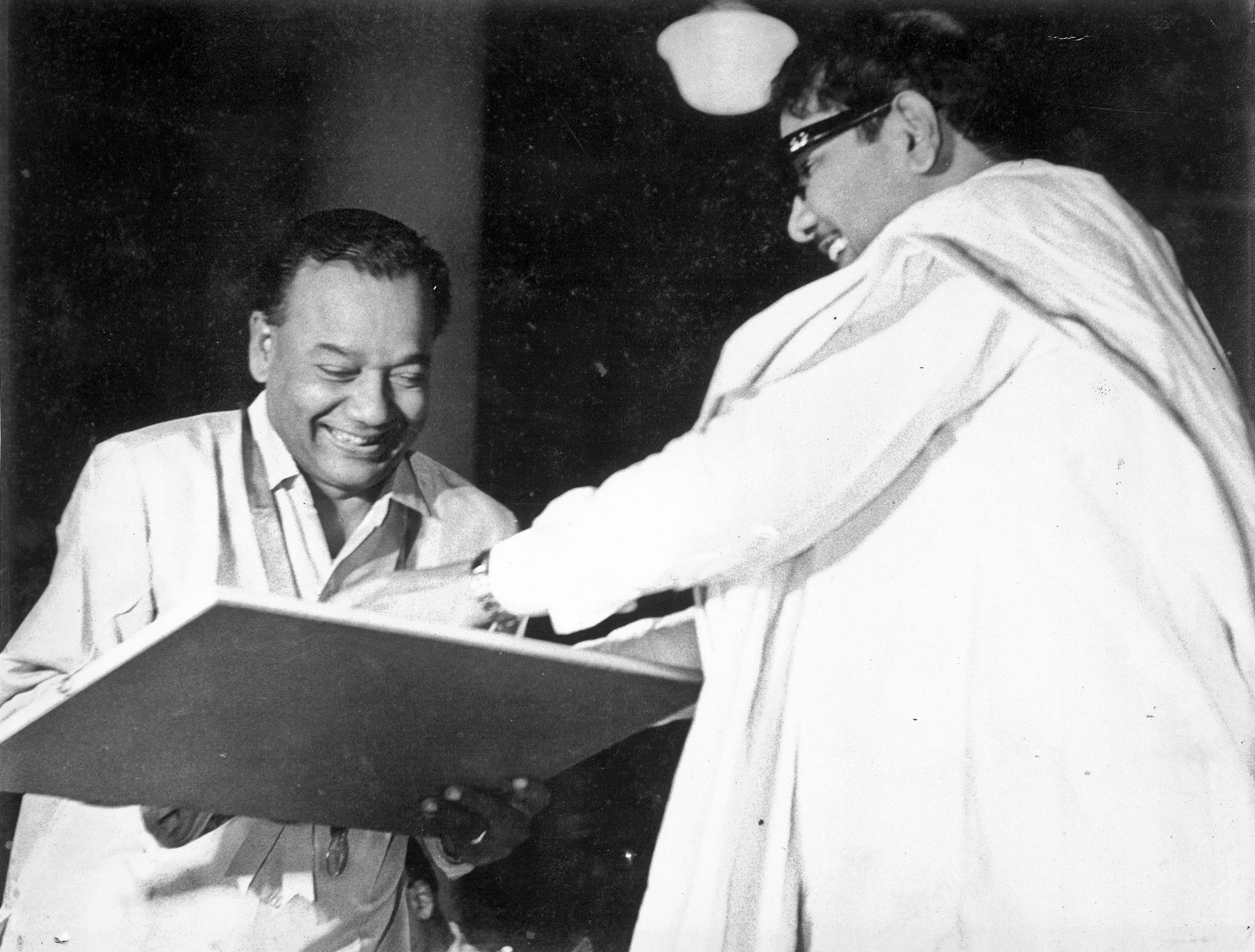
- The Kalaimamani being presented to V.Govindasamy Naiker by former Tamil Nadu Chief Minister M. Karunanidhi.
- Awarded for: Best in the field of Arts
- Sponsored by: Government of Tamil Nadu
- Location: Tamil Nadu, India
- Presented by: Tamil Nadu Eyal Isai Nataka Manram
- Status: Active
- First award: 1955
- Website: Official website

The Kalaimamani (lit. 'Jewel of Arts') is the highest civilian award in the state of Tamil Nadu, India. These awards are given by the Tamil Nadu Iyal Isai Nataka Mandram (literature, music and theatre), a unit of the Directorate of Art and Culture, Government of Tamil Nadu established in 1955, to recognise artists in the state for their achievements.

The Tamil Nadu government has appointed folk singer Pushpavanam Kuppusamy as the President and Chairman of Tamil Nadu Iyal Isai Nataka Manram.

== Awardees by year ==
=== 1958–1960 ===
The individuals listed below were recipients of the Kalaimamani for the year 1958–60.

| Category | Name | Role / Specialization |
|---|---|---|
| Films | Padmini | Actress |

Note: Actress Padmini was the 1st Receipient of the award

=== 1962–1963 ===
The individuals listed below were recipients of the Kalaimamani for the year 1962–63.

| Category | Name | Role / Specialization |
|---|---|---|
| Films | Sivaji Ganesan | Actor |

=== 1968 ===
The individuals listed below were recipients of the Kalaimamani for the year 1968.

| Category | Name | Role / Specialization |
|---|---|---|
| Films | K. A. Thangavelu | Actor |
| Films | Savitri (actress) | Actress |
| Music | K. S. Narayanaswamy | Veena |

=== 1969–1970 ===
The individuals listed below were recipients of the Kalaimamani for the year 1969-70.

| Category | Name | Role / Specialization |
|---|---|---|
| Films | Sowcar Janaki | Actress |

=== 1970–1971 ===
The individuals listed below were recipients of the Kalaimamani for the year 1970-71.

| Category | Name | Role / Specialization |
|---|---|---|
| Music | M. S. Viswanathan | Music Composer |

=== 1971 ===
The individuals listed below were recipients of the Kalaimamani for the year 1971.

| Category | Name | Role / Specialization |
|---|---|---|
| Music | Madras A. Kannan | Mridangam |
| Music | G. N. Dhandapani Iyer | Veena |

=== 1973 ===
The individuals listed below were recipients of the Kalaimamani for the year 1973.

| Category | Name | Role / Specialization |
|---|---|---|
| Films | J. Jayalalithaa | Actress |
| Films | K. Balachander | Director |
| Music | P. K. Subbaiyar | — |
| Music | V.Govindasamy Naiker | Violin |

=== 1977 ===
The individuals listed below were recipients of the Kalaimamani for the year 1977.

| Category | Name | Role / Specialization |
|---|---|---|
| Films | Srividya | Actress |

=== 1978–1979 ===
The individuals listed below were recipients of the Kalaimamani for the year 1978–79.

| Category | Name | Role / Specialization |
|---|---|---|
| Films | Kamal Haasan | Actor |

=== 1979 ===
The individuals listed below were recipients of the Kalaimamani for the year 1979.

| Category | Name | Role / Specialization |
|---|---|---|
| Films | Vyjayanthimala | Actress |
| Films | Manna Dey | Singer |

=== 1980 ===
The individuals listed below were recipients of the Kalaimamani for the year 1980.

| Category | Name | Role / Specialization |
|---|---|---|
| Films | Sripriya | Actress |
| Music | Thanjavur R. Ramamoorthy | Mridangam |

=== 1981 ===
The individuals listed below were recipients of the Kalaimamani for the year 1981.

| Category | Name | Role / Specialization |
|---|---|---|
| Films | S. P. Balasubrahmanyam | Singer |
| Music | Madurai N. Krishnan | Vocal |

=== 1982 ===
The individuals listed below were recipients of the Kalaimamani for the year 1982.

| Category | Name | Role / Specialization |
|---|---|---|
| Dance | Chitra Visweswaran | Bharatanatyam |

=== 1983–1984 ===
The individuals listed below were recipients of the Kalaimamani for the year 1983–84.

| Category | Name | Role / Specialization |
|---|---|---|
| Films | P. Bhanumathi | Actress |

=== 1984–1985 ===
The individuals listed below were recipients of the Kalaimamani for the year 1984–85.

| Category | Name | Role / Specialization |
|---|---|---|
| Films | Rajinikanth | Actor |
| Films | Sabhapati Srinivas | — |
| Films | L. R. Eswari | Singer |

=== 1986–1987 ===
The individuals listed below were recipients of the Kalaimamani for the year 1986–87.

| Category | Name | Role / Specialization |
|---|---|---|
| Films | K. J. Yesudas | Singer |
| Films | S. Janaki | Singer |

=== 1987–1988 ===
The individuals listed below were recipients of the Kalaimamani for the year 1987–88.

| Category | Name | Role / Specialization |
|---|---|---|
| Music | Tiruchi S. Swaminatha Iyer | Vocal |

=== 1988–1989 ===
The individuals listed below were recipients of the Kalaimamani for the year 1988–89.

| Category | Name | Role / Specialization |
|---|---|---|
| Films | Ilaiyaraaja | Music Composer |

=== 1990 ===
The individuals listed below were recipients of the Kalaimamani for the year 1990.

| Category | Name | Role / Specialization |
|---|---|---|
| Music | Guruvayur Dorai | Mridangam. |
| Dance | V.P.Dhananjayan | Bharatanatyam. |

=== 1991 ===
The individuals listed below were recipients of the Kalaimamani for the year 1991.

| Category | Name | Role / Specialization |
|---|---|---|
| Films | Sukumari | Actress |
| Films | P. Leela | Singer |

=== 1992–1993 ===
The individuals listed below were recipients of the Kalaimamani for the year 1992–93.

| Category | Name | Specialty / Role |
|---|---|---|
| Literature | Bagarathan | Author |
| Literature | Ervadi S. Radhakrishnan | Author |
| Literature | S. N. Sriramadesikan | Tamil Research |
| Music | Salem D. Sellam Aiyyangar | Vocal |
| Music | Trichur V. Ramachandran | Vocal |
| Music | V. V. Subrahmanyam | Violin |
| Music | Ramanathapuram M.N. Kandasamy | Mridangam |
| Music | Mayiladuthurai G. Somasundaram | Kanjira |
| Music | Anayampatti S. Ganesan | Jalatarangam |
| Music | Sirkazhi S. Thirugnanasambantham | Devotional Singer |
| Music | Sengalipuram P.N. Ramamurthi Dikshithar | Musical Discourse |
| Music | Pathamadai M. Raja | Nadaswaram |
| Music | Sheshampatti D. Sivalingam | Nadaswaram |
| Music | Perumpallam P. Venkatesan | Thavil |
| Dance | Krishnakumari Narendran | Bharatanatyam Teacher |
| Dance | D.S. Kathirvel | Bharatanatyam Teacher |
| Dance | Lakshmi Viswanathan | Bharatanatyam |
| Dance | R. Gauri | Bharatanatyam Music |
| Dance | D.P. Venugopal Pillai | Bharatanatyam Mridangam |
| Theatre | Marina (Sridhar) | Playwright |
| Theatre | D.P. Samikkannu | Stage Actor |
| Theatre | Thillai Rajan | Stage Producer |
| Theatre | S.R. Dasarathan | Stage Actor |
| Theatre | D.R. Latha | Stage Actress |
| Theatre | S.R. Veeraraghavan | Stage Actor |
| Films | Premalaya R. Venkataraman | Film Producer |
| Films | G.R. Nathan | Film Director |
| Films | Nizhalgal S. Ravi | Actor |
| Films | Revathi | Actress |
| Films | K. K. Soundar | Actor |
| Films | A. S. Prakasam | Dialogue Writer |
| Films | Sachu | Actress |
| Films | S. Rajeswara Rao | Music Composer |
| Films | A. L. Raghavan | Singer |
| Musical Theatre | P.S. Manimuthu Bhagavathar | Stage Actor |
| Musical Theatre | Senthamangalam S.V. Balasubramaniyam | Stage Actor |
| Musical Theatre | D.M. Pankaja | Stage Actress |
| Musical Theatre | M.S. Venkatasalam | Harmonium |
| Folk Arts | N. Subramaniya Thambiran | Theru Koothu |
| Folk Arts | Kollangudi Karuppayee | Folk Singer |

=== 1993–1994 ===
The individuals listed below were recipients of the Kalaimamani for the year 1993–94.

| Category | Name | Role / Specialization |
|---|---|---|
| Literature | L. S. Ramamirtham | Writer |
| Music | D. K. Pattammal | Carnatic lyricist |
| Music | Sudha Ragunathan | Violin |
| Music | P. Ganammal | Harmonium |
| Music | T. G. Subramaniam | Thavil |
| Dance | Malavika Sarukkai | Bharatanatyam |
| Theatre | S. Ve. Shekher | Stage Actor |
| Theatre | Kathadi Ramamurthy | Stage Actor |
| Films | Delhi Ganesh | Actor |
| Films | R. Sarathkumar | Actor |
| Films | Sukanya | Actress |
| Films | R. V. Udayakumar | Director |
| Films | T. P. Samikannu | Actor |
| Films | Swarnalatha | Singer |
| Folk Arts | Sundararaj Naidu | Karagam |

=== 1994–1995 ===
The individuals listed below were recipients of the Kalaimamani for the year 1994–95.

| Category | Recipient | Specialty / Role |
|---|---|---|
| Literature | R. Nagaswamy | Author |
| Music | Maharajapuram K. Nagarajan | Carnatic Teacher |
| Music | Pozhakudi P.V. Ganesaiyer | Carnatic Teacher |
| Music | P.T. Chelladurai | Music Research Artist |
| Music | Thirukoilur Sisters (Alamelu Arjunan & Pushpa Natarajan) | Vocal |
| Music | R. Vedavalli | Vocal |
| Music | Sikkil Mala Chandrasekar | Flute |
| Music | Thirukokarnam K. Chelliah | Thavil |
| Music | Madurai N. Thavasi Pillai | Thavil |
| Music | Mambalam M.K.S. Siva | Nadaswaram |
| Music | Andangkoil A.V. Selvarathinam | Nadaswaram |
| Music | Thiruparkadal S. Veeraraghavan | Violin |
| Music | Kalyanapuram R. Aravamudhan | Harikatha |
| Music | Suseendram Krishnan | Mridangam |
| Music | Mayavaram T.S. Rajaram | Morsing |
| Music | Muthukrishnan | Mridangam |
| Music | Umayalpuram K. Narayanaswamy | Ghatam |
| Music | Dr.Suma Sudhindra | Veena |
| Music | Kovai Kamala | Devotional Singer |
| Music | G. Harishankar | Kanjira |
| Dance | K.J. Seetha Rajagopal | Bharatanatyam Teacher |
| Dance | Ranganayaki Jayaraman | Bharatanatyam |
| Dance | Shanta Dhananjayan | Bharatanatyam |
| Dance | Dr. Srinidhi Rangarajan | Bharatanatyam |
| Dance | Dr. Rajalakshmi Santhanam | Bharatanatyam Music |
| Theatre | Peeli Sivam | Stage Actor |
| Theatre | Salem N.M.V. Velan | Stage Actor |
| Theatre | R.A. Ayyasami Desigar | Stage Actor |
| Theatre | S.V. Shanmugam | Stage Actor |
| Theatre | Rani Somanathan | Stage Actress |
| Theatre | S. V. Venkatraman | Stage Producer |
| Theatre | N.S. Ravishankar | Playwright |
| Films | Gemini Mahalingam | Actor |
| Films | Mani Ratnam | Director |
| Films | Arvind Swamy | Actor |
| Films | Khushbu Sundar | Actress |
| Films | A. R. Rahman | Music Composer |
| Films | P. Unnikrishnan | Singer |
| Films | Jikki | Singer |
| Films | Mano | Singer |
| Films | V.T. Arasu | Producer |
| Musical Theatre | A.P. Srinivasan | Actor |
| Musical Theatre | Karur A. Saradha | Actress |
| Musical Theatre | N.S. Varadarajan | Lyricist |
| Musical Theatre | T.S. Marudappa | Mridangam |
| Folk Arts | Avudaiyur Koil T.N. Somasundara Odhuvar | Singer |
| Folk Arts | Pulavar T. Muthuswami | Villupattu |
| Folk Arts | Purisai P.K. Sambandan | Theru Koothu |
| Folk Arts | A.S. Manickavasagam | Tholpavai Koothu |
| Other | Thanjavur N. Veerasamy | Thanjavur Painting Art |
| Other | Sirppi T.K. Chelladurai | Sculptor |
| Other | K.R. Sundara sthapathy | Sculptor |
| Other | A.P. Santhan Raj | Fine Arts |

=== 1995–1996 ===
The individuals listed below were recipients of the Kalaimamani for the year 1995–96.

| Category | Name | Role / Specialization |
|---|---|---|
| Films | P. Jayachandran | Singer |
| Films | K. S. Chithra | Singer |
| Dance | Revathi Ramachandran | Bharatnatyam |

=== 1998 ===
The individuals listed below were recipients of the Kalaimamani for the year 1998.

| Category | Name | Role / Specialization |
|---|---|---|
| Literature | Dr. Silamboli S. Chellappan | Prose |
| Literature | M. P. Somasundaram | Prose |
| Literature | Poet Mudiyarasan | Poet |
| Literature | Poet A. Vezhavendhan | Poet |
| Literature | Dr. Saradha Nambi Arooran | Literary Orator |
| Literature | Valampuri John | Literary Orator |
| Music | Kulikkarai P. Viswalingam | Vocal |
| Music | V. S. K. Sakkarapani | Violin |
| Music | A. Premkumar | Mridangam |
| Music | Revathi Krishna | Veena |
| Music | Srirangam Kannan | Morsing |
| Music | Thirupamburam Brothers (T.K.S.Swaminathan & T.K.S.Meenatchisundaram) | Nadaswaram |
| Music | Thiruvidaimaruthur P. S. V. Raja | Nadaswaram Teacher |
| Music | Thirukkannapura Jayachandran | Thavil |
| Music | Idumbavanam K. S. Kannan | Thavil |
| Music | T. K. S. Kalaivanan | Tamil Isai |
| Music | T. L. Maharajan | Tamil Isai |
| Music | Saraswathi Srinivasan | Devotional Singer |
| Music | Arularasu Masilamani | Religious Discourse |
| Music | S. R. Janakiraman | Music Research |
| Music | M. V. M. ChellamuthuPillai | Mandolin |
| Dance | K. Subbulakshmi | Bharatanatyam Teacher |
| Dance | Anita Ratnam | Bharatanatyam Research |
| Dance | Priyadarsini Govind | Bharatanatyam |
| Dance | Priya Sundaresan | Bharatanatyam |
| Dance | Padma Rajagopalan | Bharatanatyam Music |
| Dance | Srikala Bharath | Dance Drama |
| Dance | Uma Muralikrishna | Kuchipudi |
| Theatre | M. S. Rajaram | Playwright / Theatre Writer |
| Theatre | Kanchi Rangamani | Stage Producer |
| Theatre | Police Ve. Kannan | Stage Director |
| Theatre | K. Shanmugasundaram | Stage Actor |
| Theatre | T. N. Krishnan | Stage Actor |
| Theatre | Kausalya Senthamarai | Stage Actress |
| Theatre | S. R. Gopal | Stage Actor |
| Theatre | Ve. Pa. Balaraman | Stage Playwright |
| Theatre | K. A. Wahab Khan | Theatre Harmonium |
| Theatre | Vikadam Krishnamoorthy | Mimicry |
| Films | R. M. Veerappan | Producer |
| Films | A. V. M. Saravanan | Producer |
| Films | K. R. Gangadharan | Producer |
| Films | Agathiyan | Director |
| Films | R. Pattabhiraman | Director |
| Films | Napoleon | Actor |
| Films | C. Joseph Vijay | Actor |
| Films | Prashanth | Actor |
| Films | Meena | Actress |
| Films | Roja | Actress |
| Films | Kumarimuthu | Actor |
| Films | Thiagu | Actor |
| Films | Manivannan | Director / Actor |
| Films | Nassar | Actor |
| Films | Raghuvaran | Actor |
| Films | M. D. Sundar | Screenplay Writer |
| Films | Visu | Dialogue Writer |
| Films | M. Rathinakumar | Dialogue Writer |
| Films | Palani Bharathi | Lyricist |
| Films | Siddhartha | Music Composer |
| Films | P. Jayachandran | Singer |
| Films | K. Jamuna Rani | Singer |
| Films | P. C. Sreeram | Cinematographer |
| Films | Thota Tharani | Art Director |
| Films | N Yoganandan alias Yoga | Photographer |
| Films | S. M. Umar | Publicity |
| Films | Cinema Express V. Ramamurthy | Film Journalist |
| Films | Dr. Magnet A. Rajaram | Film Researcher |
| Musical Theatre | T. P. Chellappa | Stage Actor |
| Musical Theatre | K. S. Kala | Stage Actress |
| Folk Arts | P. Gandhimathi | Villupattu |
| Folk Arts | S. R. Marikannu | Karagattam |
| Folk Arts | M. Kumararaman | Devarattam |
| Folk Arts | M. Pichaiyappa | Kavadi |
| Folk Arts | A. S. Balasubramanian | Tholpavai Koothu |
| Other | R. Yagnaraman | Cultural Art Promoter |
| Other | Best Drama Troupe | Gopi Theatres |
| Other | Best Art Organization | Karthik Fine Arts |

=== 1999 ===
The individuals listed below were recipients of the Kalaimamani for the year 1999.

| Category | Name | Role / Specialization |
|---|---|---|
| Literature | Prof Dr. N. Subbu Reddiar | Author |
| Literature | Erode Tamilanban | Poet |
| Literature | Deivasigamani Ponnambala Desigar | Orator |
| Music | Keeranur C. Guru Ramalingam | Vocal |
| Music | Kalugumalai A. Kandasamy | Vocal |
| Music | Nithyasree Mahadevan | Vocal |
| Music | Tiruvarur N. Balam | Violin Teacher |
| Music | M. Lalitha | Violin |
| Music | M. Nandini | Violin |
| Music | T. R. Sambasivan | Veena |
| Music | V. Nanjundiah | Flute |
| Music | Srimushnam V. Raja Rao | Mridangam |
| Music | Tiruvarur T. N. Ruthrapathi | Nadaswaram |
| Music | Poovalur P. R. Nagarajan | Nadaswaram |
| Music | Thirupunkur T. G. Muthukumarasamy | Thavil |
| Music | Thirukkarugavur T. Sivagurunathan | Thavil Teacher |
| Music | T. V. Meenakshisundaram | Thirumurai Thevaram Music |
| Dance | Saroja Vaidyanathan | Bharatanatyam Teacher |
| Dance | Hema Sripal | Bharatanatyam |
| Dance | Parvathi Ravi Ghantasala | Bharatanatyam |
| Dance | Padmini Dorairajan | Bharatanatyam |
| Dance | Dr. Manjula Lusti Narasimhan | Dance Art Promoter |
| Dance | Tanjore A. Natarajan | Bharatanatyam Mridangam |
| Theatre | T. K. Mariappan | Stage Actor |
| Theatre | Pasi Sathya | Stage Actress |
| Theatre | S. Gajendra Kumar | Playwright |
| Theatre | Trichy T. S. Sivaprakasam | Non-professional Theatre Actor |
| Films | Arjun | Actor |
| Films | Livingston | Actor |
| Films | R. Sundarrajan | Actor |
| Films | Ramya Krishnan | Actress |
| Films | S. Radhabai | Actress |
| Films | T. P. Muthulakshmi | Actress |
| Films | Kovai Chezhiyan | Producer |
| Films | R. Vikraman | Director |
| Films | Thankar Bachan | Cinematographer |
| Films | R. Selvaraj | Screenplay Writer |
| Films | Piraisoodan | Lyricist |
| Films | S. N. Surendar | Singer |
| Films | S. A. Rajkumar | Music Composer |
| Films | R. Sundaramoorthy | Makeup Artist |
| Musical Theatre | Chokkalinga Bhagavathar | Stage Actor |
| Musical Theatre | M. S. Renuka Devi | Stage Actress |
| Musical Theatre | Madurai R. Kuppanna | Musical Theatre Mridangam |
| Folk Arts | C. Balakrishnan | Theru Koothu |
| Folk Arts | Iraniyur A. Lakshmi | Karagattam |
| Folk Arts | S. Paramasivam | Kavadi |
| Folk Arts | A. Mookaiya | Naiyandi Melam Nadaswaram |
| Folk Arts | R. Sundaram | Naiyandi Melam Thavil |
| Folk Arts | Karumuthu Thiagarajan | Folk Lyricist |
| Folk Arts | S. Saraswathi | Folk Music |
| Folk Arts | Kalugumalai G. Muthulakshmi | Villisai |
| Others | V. K. T. Balan | Cultural Art Promoter |
| Others | R. Ramachandran | Cultural Art Promoter |

=== 2000 ===
The individuals listed below were recipients of the Kalaimamani for the year 1999-2000.

| Category | Name | Role / Specialization |
|---|---|---|
| Films | Ajith Kumar | Actor |
| Films | Devayani | Actress |
| Music | Girija Ramaswamy | Vocal |
| Music | Swarnalatha | Vocal |

=== 2001 ===
The individuals listed below were recipients of the Kalaimamani for the year 2001.

| Category | Name | Role / Specialization |
|---|---|---|
| Literature | M.R. Gurusamy | Writer |
| Music | Vairamangalam Lakshmi Narayanan | Vocal |
| Music | Manakkal S. Rangarajan | Vocal |
| Music | Shashank Subramanyam | Flute |
| Music | M. A. Sundareswaran | Violin |
| Music | T. K. Padmanabhan | Violin |
| Music | Madurai T. Srinivasan | Mridangam |
| Music | Nellai D. Kannan | Mridangam |
| Music | T. M. Krishnamurthy | Mridangam |
| Music | R. Kalyanaraman | Ghatam |
| Music | Rajalakshmi Narayanan | Veena |
| Music | Seetha Doraiswamy | Jalatarangam |
| Music | Adyar S. Jayaraman | Nadaswaram |
| Music | Thirunageswaram T. R. Govindarajan | Thavil |
| Music | Valayapatti S. Malarvannan | Thavil |
| Music | P. V. N. Nadhamani | Clarinet |
| Music | K.Somu | Devotional Singer |
| Music | Karandhai G. Damodaran | Devotional Singer |
| Music | Rathinasabapathy Desikar | Thirumurai Thevaram Music |
| Dance | Udipi Lakshmi Narayanan | Bharatanatyam |
| Dance | M. V. Narasimhachari | Bharatanatyam |
| Dance | Vasanthalakshmi Narasimhachari | Bharatanatyam |
| Dance | C. R. Radha Badhri | Bharatanatyam |
| Theatre | V. Brinda | Stage Actor |
| Films | Vijayakanth | Actor |
| Films | Murali | Actor |
| Films | Rekha Harris | Actor |
| Films | Gundu Kalyanam | Actor |
| Films | T. K. Pugazhendi | Music Composer |
| Films | A. P. Komala | Actress |
| Films | Radha Krishnan Chidambaram | Actor/Producer |
| Films | T. K. S. Karuppaiah | Actor |
| Films | 'Periyar' Rajavelu | Actor |
| Folk Arts | A. Gunavathi | Karagam |
| Folk Arts | V. Dakshinamurthy | Theru Koothu |

=== 2002 ===
The individuals listed below were recipients of the Kalaimamani for the year 2001-2002.

| Category | Name | Role / Specialization |
|---|---|---|
| Literature | L. P. Karu Ramanathan Chettiar | — |
| Literature | Ponnadiyan | Writer |
| Music | T. S. Narayanasamy | Vocal |
| Music | Meera Sivaramakrishnan | Violin |
| Music | Ramani | Veena |
| Music | Vaikkom R. Gopalakrishnan | Ghatam |
| Music | S. Venkataraman | Flute |
| Music | T. S. Vasudeva Rao | Tabla |
| Music | A. C. Jayaraman | Nadaswaram |
| Music | S. Kasim | Nadaswaram |
| Music | Kovai Natarajan | Harmonium |
| Music | Dr.S. Sunder | Music Research |
| Dance | Krishnaveni Lakshmanan | Bharatanatyam |
| Dance | Ananda Shankar Jayant | Bharatanatyam |
| Dance | C. V. Chandrasekhar | Bharatanatyam |
| Dance | Mannargudi N. Sakthivadivel | Bharatanatyam |
| Dance | C. P. Venkatesan | Bharatanatyam |
| Dance | Yogam Santhanam | Bharatanatyam |
| Dance | Melattur S. Kumar | Bharatanatyam |
| Theatre | K. G. 'Typist' Gopu | Stage Actor |
| Theatre | Koothapiran | Stage Actor |
| Theatre | K. S. Krishnan | Stage Actor |
| Films | Vijaya Shanthi | Actress |
| Films | Vinu Chakravarthy | Actor |
| Films | Goundamani | Actor |
| Films | Senthil | Actor |
| Films | S. M. S. Vasanth | Actor |
| Films | Kovai Anuradha | Actor |
| Films | Vazhuvur R. Manickavinayakam | Light music |
| Folk Arts | Sarangapani | Karagam |
| Folk Arts | P. A. Subbulakshmi Palaamadai | Villupattu |

=== 2002-2003 ===
The individuals listed below were recipients of the Kalaimamani for the year 2002-2003.

| Category | Name | Role / Specialization |
|---|---|---|
| Films | Prakash Raj | Actor |
| Films | Simran | Actress |
| Films | Kanaka | Actress |
| Films | Vivek | Actor |
| Films | L. Vaidyanathan | Music Composer |
| Films | Gajapathy | Actor |
| Films | Nanjil P. T. Sami | Screenplay Writer |
| Films | K. R. Rathinam | Actor |
| Musical Theatre | S. Soundappan | Stage Actor |
| Music | Sulochana Pattabhiraman | Vocal |
| Music | Nagai Muralidharan | Violin |
| Music | S. Ravindaran | Veena |
| Music | Mannargudi A. Eswaran | Mridangam |
| Music | R. Raman | Morsing |
| Music | H. Ramakrishnan | Konnakol |
| Music | Mannargudi M. S. K. Sankaranarayanan | Nadaswaram |
| Music | Denkanikotta Mani | Thavil |
| Music | Purisai Arunagiri | Devotional Singer |
| Dance | Thanjavur Rajalakshmi | Bharatanatyam |
| Dance | G. Lakshmi Rajam | Bharatanatyam |
| Dance | K. S. R. Aniruddha | Bharatanatyam |
| Dance | Ramya Ramanarayan | Bharatanatyam |
| Folk Arts | Thenmozhi Rajendran | Karagam |
| Folk Arts | S. Sivasankaran Pillai | Oyilattam |
| Other | 'Rocket' Ramanathan | Mimicry |
| Other | S. Parthasarathi | Cultural Art Promoter |

=== 2003-2004 ===
The individuals listed below were recipients of the Kalaimamani for the year 2003-2004.

| Category | Name | Role / Specialization |
|---|---|---|
| Dance | Gopika Varma | Mohiniyattam |
| Films | Vikram | Actor |
| Films | Sneha | Actress |
| Films | C. R. Saraswathi | Actress |
| Films | P. Vasu | Director |

=== 2004-2005 ===
The individuals listed below were recipients of the Kalaimamani for the year 2004-2005.

| Category | Name | Role / Specialization |
|---|---|---|
| Literature | Vamanan | Film historian |
| Literature | G. Gnanasambandan | Public Speaker |
| Music | Anuradha Sriram | Vocal |
| Music | B. Vasantha | Vocal |
| Dance | Leela Samson | Bharatanatyam |
| Theatre | Bombay Gnanam | Stage Actress |
| Films | Suriya | Actor |
| Films | Jyothika | Actress |
| Films | Vadivelu | Actor |
| Films | Hariharan | Singer |

=== 2006 ===
The individuals listed below were recipients of the Kalaimamani for the year 2006.

| Category | Name | Role / Specialization |
|---|---|---|
| Literature | Balakumaran | Writer |
| Literature | Vannadasan | Writer |
| Literature | Poet Kalapriya | Poet |
| Literature | Suba Veerapandian | Public Speaker |
| Literature | Marabin Mainthan Muthaiah | Literary Speaker |
| Literature | Dr.R.Selvakkanapathi | Religious Orator |
| Literature | R.P.Naidu | Religious Orator |
| Music | Geetha Rajashekar | Music Teacher |
| Music | Sanjay Subrahmanyan | Vocal |
| Music | K.Srivatsa | Mridangam |
| Music | Saraswathi Rajagopalan | Veena |
| Music | Iraiyanban Kuthus | Devotional Singer |
| Music | Injikudi E.M. Subramaniam | Nadaswaram |
| Music | Malaikottai S. Subramanian | Thavil |
| Dance | Girija Pakkirisamy | Bharatanatyam Teacher |
| Dance | Nalini Balakrishnan | Bharatanatyam Teacher |
| Dance | Padma Sampath Kumaran | Bharatanatyam |
| Dance | Dr. Sindhuri | Bharatanatyam |
| Dance | Divya Kasturi | Bharatanatyam |
| Dance | Narthaki Nataraj (Transgender) | Bharatanatyam |
| Dance | R. Mutharasi | Bharatanatyam |
| Theatre | Poet Inquilab | Playwright |
| Theatre | Prof Raasu | Theatre Director |
| Theatre | R. Thangaraj (M.L.A. Thangaraj) | Stage Actor |
| Theatre | Trichy V. Moorthy | Stage Actor |
| Theatre | G. Devipriya (Ramanadevi) | Stage Actress |
| Theatre | V.R. Thilagam | Veteran Stage Actress |
| Films | Kovai Thambi | Producer |
| Films | Seeman | Director |
| Films | R. Parthiban | Actor |
| Films | Silambarasan | Actor |
| Films | Ravi Mohan | Actor |
| Films | Jiiva | Actor |
| Films | Vishal | Actor |
| Films | Trisha Krishnan | Actress |
| Films | Navya Nair | Actress |
| Films | Ganja Karuppu | Actor |
| Films | Aarthi Ganeshkar | Actress |
| Films | Vineeth | Actor |
| Films | C. I. D. Sakunthala | Actress |
| Films | Bala | Story Writer |
| Films | Pa. Vijay | Lyricist |
| Films | Na. Muthukumar | Lyricist |
| Films | Kabilan | Lyricist |
| Films | Vidyasagar | Music Composer |
| Films | Tippu | Singer |
| Films | Madhu Balakrishnan | Singer |
| Films | Bombay Jayashri | Singer |
| Films | M. V. Panneerselvam | Cinematographer |
| Films | R. Vittal | Editor |
| Films | T. Adheera Pandiyan | Film Journalist / Editor |
| Films | National Chellaiya | Photographer |
| Musical Theatre | V.P. Jeganathan | Stage Actor |
| Musical Theatre | Seethalakshmi (G.M. Chithirai Selvi) | Stage Actress |
| Television | Venu Arvind | Actor |
| Television | Bose Venkat | Actor |
| Television | Mounika | Actress |
| Television | K. Balasingh | Actor |
| Television | Deepa Venkat | Actress |
| Television | C.J. Bhaskar | Director |
| Television | Viduthalai | Story & Dialogue Writer |
| Television | T.G.P. Thyagarajan | Producer |
| Folk Arts | S. Periyasamy Nattar | Karagattam Art Teacher |
| Folk Arts | K. Ammachi | Karagattam |
| Folk Arts | Aakkaatti Arumugam | Folk Music |
| Folk Arts | Dr.K.A. Gunasekaran | Folk Music Researcher |
| Other | Trotsky Marudu | Fine Arts |
| Other | Alex | Magic Arts |

Note: Actor Venu Arvind was the first TV actor to receive the award.

=== 2007 ===
The individuals listed below were recipients of the Kalaimamani for the year 2007.

| Category | Name | Role / Specialization |
|---|---|---|
| Literature | A. Madhavan | Writer |
| Literature | Sirpi Balasubramaniam | Poet |
| Literature | Andal Priyadarshini | Poet |
| Literature | Dr. A. Maraimalayan | Writer |
| Literature | Saroj Narayanaswami | News Reader |
| Literature | Dr.Peru. Mathiyazhagan | Literary Research |
| Literature | Dr.Sarala Rajagopalan | Literary Research |
| Literature | Dr.Avvai Natarajan | Tamil Scholar |
| Literature | S. Masilamani | Orator |
| Literature | Suki Sivam | Religious Discourse |
| Music | Sirkali R. Jayaraman | Music Teacher |
| Music | M.S. Muthappa Bhagavathar | Music Teacher |
| Music | Maharajapuram S. Srinivasan | Vocal |
| Music | Andankoil V.C. Sivakumar | Vocal |
| Music | Ve. Thaayanban | Music Composer |
| Music | Embar S. Kannan | Violin |
| Music | Vazhuvoor Ravi | Mridangam |
| Music | A. Drums Sivamani | Percussionist |
| Music | Dr.S.Sadasivan | Devotional Singer |
| Music | Veeramani Raju | Devotional Singer |
| Music | V.S. Gurusamy Desigar | Folk Artist |
| Music | Thirumeignanam T.V. Rajagopal Pillai | Nadaswaram |
| Music | S.V. Meenakshi Sundaram | Nadaswaram |
| Music | Thulaichangadu T.M. Ramanathan | Thavil |
| Music | Senthamangalam A. Manikandan | Thavil |
| Dance | N. Sailaja | Bharatanatyam Teacher |
| Dance | Swetha Gopalan | Bharatanatyam Artist |
| Dance | Sangeetha Kabilan | Bharatanatyam |
| Dance | Kayalvizhi Kabilan | Bharatanatyam |
| Dance | Aishwarya Rajinikanth Dhanush | Bharatanatyam |
| Dance | Zakir Hussain | Bharatanatyam |
| Dance | Vasantha Vaikunth | Dance Drama |
| Theatre | K.N.R. Rajamani | Stage Actress |
| Theatre | Dr. M. Ramasamy | Playwright |
| Theatre | Koothupattarai N. Muthusamy | Producer |
| Theatre | V.O. Das | Set Designer |
| Films | Abirami Ramanathan | Producer |
| Films | Cheran | Director |
| Films | Sundar C | Director / Actor |
| Films | Bharath | Actor |
| Films | Meera Jasmine | Actress |
| Films | Nayanthara | Actress |
| Films | Asin | Actress |
| Films | M. Pasupathy | Actor |
| Films | Shobana | Actress |
| Films | R. Vaiyapuri | Actor |
| Films | Dr. P. Saroja Devi | Actress |
| Films | K. Vedamputhu Kannan | Dialogue Writer |
| Films | Harris Jayaraj | Music Composer |
| Films | R. D. Rajasekhar | Cinematographer |
| Films | P. Krishnamoorthy | Art Director |
| Films | Chithra Swaminathan | Photographer |
| Films | Naveen | Film Journalist |
| Musical Theatre | C. David | Mridangam |
| Musical Theatre | Sembai S. Archunan | Harmonium |
| Folk Arts | R. Viswanathan | Therukoothu |
| Folk Arts | A. Sankarapandian | Kavadi Attam |
| Folk Arts | N. Velavan Sangeetha | Villu Pattu |
| Folk Arts | Po. Kailasamurthy | Oyilattam |
| Folk Arts | Oraiyur Sa. Muthukumar | Karakattam |
| Television | Sundar K. Vijayan | Director |
| Television | V. Thiruselvam | Director |
| Television | Bhasker Sakthi | Story & Dialogue Writer |
| Television | Abhishek Shankar | Actor |
| Television | Anu Hasan | Actress |
| Television | Amarasigamani | Actor |
| Television | Ma. Devipriya | Actress |
| Television | M.M. Rengasamy | Cinematographer |
| Television | Ramesh Prabha | Producer/Presenter |
| Other | N. Srinivasan | Fine Arts |
| Other | Salama Ko. Manilal | Cultural Art Promoter |
| Other | Kalaichelvam Shambu (Sri Sankara Narayana Sabha, Aaduthurai) | Best Art Organization |
| Other | Ma. Ira. Panchanatham (Tamizh Isai Mandram, Thiruvaiyaru) | Best Drama Troupe |

=== 2009-2010 ===
The individuals listed below were recipients of the Kalaimamani for the year 2009-2010.

| Category | Name | Role / Specialization |
|---|---|---|
| Literature | Tamizhannal | Tamil scholar |
| Literature | Dindigul I. Leoni | Public Speaker |
| Literature | Mangaiyarkkarasi | Spiritual orator |
| Literature | S. Sathyaseelan | Spiritual orator |
| Music | T. V. Gopalakrishnan | Vocal |
| Music | K. N. Shashikiran | Vocal |
| Music | Rajhesh Vaidhya | Veena |
| Music | Tiruvarur Swaminathan | Flute |
| Theatre | Prasanna Ramaswamy | Stage Director |
| Films | Anushka Shetty | Actress |
| Films | Tamannaah Bhatia | Actress |
| Films | Arya | Actor |
| Films | Kalyani Menon | Singer |

=== 2011 ===
The individuals listed below were recipients of the Kalaimamani for the year 2011.

| Category | Name | Role / Specialization |
|---|---|---|
| Literature | S. Shankara Subramaniyan | Author |
| Literature | Kovi Manisekaran | Writer |
| Literature | Lena Tamilvannan | Author / Publisher |
| Literature | Dr. Tiruppur Krishnan | Writer |
| Literature | C. Ramasamy | Poet |
| Music | Neyveli Santhanagopalan | Vocal |
| Music | Lalgudi Vijayalakshmi | Violin |
| Music | Cherthala R. Ananthakrishnan | Mridangam |
| Music | Dr.Prapancham S.Balachandran | Flute |
| Music | T. E. Pazhaniswami | Nadaswaram |
| Music | Kovilur K. V. Pazhanivel | Thavil |
| Music | Palladam S. Venkataraman Rao | Harmonium |
| Music | Janardhan Mitta | Sitar |
| Music | Abaswaram Ramji | Light music |
| Dance | Radhika Surajit | Bharatanatyam Teacher |
| Dance | Dr. Lakshmi Ramasamy | Bharatanatyam |
| Dance | K. Suryashree | Kuchipudi |
| Theatre | T. Venkatraman | Stage Actor |
| Films | P. Rajasekar | Actor |
| Films | Kutty Padmini | Actress |
| Films | P. Rajiv alias P Rajasekar | Actor |
| Films | P. Pandu | Actor |
| Films | Kunniyur R. Kalyanasundaram | Light music |
| Films | Puliyur S. Saroja | Dance Choreographer |
| Films | B. S. Sasirekha | Singer |
| Films | P. Kasi | Costume Designer |
| Musical Theatre | M. S. P. Kalaimani | Stage Actor |
| Folk Arts | A. Rajakili | Villupattu |
| Others | Harikesanallur Venkatraman | Art critic |

=== 2012 ===
The individuals listed below were recipients of the Kalaimamani for the year 2012.

| Category | Name | Role / Specialization |
|---|---|---|
| Literature | A. Subbulakshmi Ganapathy | Author |
| Literature | Tamizharuvi M. P. Ramalingam | Orator |
| Literature | Vasuki Kannappan | Writer |
| Literature | Ilakkiyavithi Iniyavan | Writer |
| Theatre | S. S. Senbagamuthu | Stage Actor |
| Theatre | N. Mahalingam | Stage Actor |
| Theatre | N. S. Parvathy | Stage Actress |
| Music | Maharajapuram S. Ramachandran | Vocal |
| Music | Dr. Mahanathi Shobana Vignesh | Vocal |
| Music | Mudikondan S. N. Ramesh | Veena |
| Music | T. Ravichandramohan | Flute |
| Music | P. V. Thirumoorthy | Nadaswaram |
| Music | A. V. Ayyavu | Percussion |
| Music | R. M. Deenadayalu | Morsing |
| Music | Udayalur K. Kalyanaraman | Devotional Singer |
| Music | M. U. Premkumar | Harmonium |
| Music | Vishaka Hari | Harikatha |
| Dance | Anita Guha | Bharatanatyam Teacher |
| Dance | Bala Devi Chandrashekar | Bharatanatyam |
| Dance | Revathy Ramachandran | Bharatanatyam |
| Films | Rajasree | Actress |
| Films | P. R. Varalakshmi | Actress |
| Films | Chitra Lakshmanan | Director / Producer |
| Films | B. V. Anandakrishnan | Cinematographer |
| Folk Arts | R. Mahalingam | Bhagavatha Mela |
| Folk Arts | S. Ulaganathan | Gaana singer |
| Folk Arts | N. Sivajirao | Kavadiattam |
| Folk Arts | S. Yogalingam | Puraviattam |
| Others | S. R. Ashok Kumar | Journalist |

=== 2013 ===
The individuals listed below were recipients of the Kalaimamani for the year 2013.

| Category | Name | Role / Specialization |
|---|---|---|
| Literature | Dr. Bala Ramani | Writer |
| Literature | Dr. T. K. Subramanian | Author |
| Music | Dr. Shuba Ganesan | Vocal |
| Music | Sugandha Kalamegham | Vocal |
| Music | P. G. Venkatesh | Violin |
| Films | Prasanna | Actor |
| Films | Nalini | Actress |
| Films | Kanchana | Actress |
| Films | Sarada (actress) | Actress |
| Films | C. V. Chandramohan | Director / Actor |
| Films | R Pandiarajan | Actor |
| Films | T. P. Gajendran | Director / Actor |
| Films | Judo K. K. Rathnam | Action Choreographer |
| Films | R. Krishnaraj | Singer |
| Folk Arts | Rashmi Menon | Mohiniattam |
| Folk Arts | T. Velmurugan | Folk Singer |
| Folk Arts | Paravai Muniyamma | Folk Singer |
| Folk Arts | M. Somasundaram | Bommalattam |
| Other | Sculptor K. Thirugnanam | Sculptor |

=== 2014 ===
The individuals listed below were recipients of the Kalaimamani for the year 2014.

| Category | Name | Role / Specialization |
|---|---|---|
| Literature | Mu. Ayyakkannu (Aikkan) | Writer |
| Literature | Dr. R V Kamalakannan | Author |
| Literature | M. Thirunavakkarasu | Poet |
| Music | Meera Nathan | Vocal |
| Music | Mambalam Sisters (R Vijayalakshmi & R Chitra) | Vocal |
| Music | P. V. Balasai | Flute |
| Music | K. S. Senthilkumaran | Nadaswaram |
| Music | Shanthi Senthilkumaran | Nadaswaram |
| Dance | Pandanallur S. Pandian | Bharatanatyam Teacher |
| Theatre | Thanjai P. K. Selvam | Stage Actor |
| Theatre | U. M. Kannan | Stage Actor |
| Theatre | M. S. Subramanian | Stage Actor |
| Films | Karthi | Actor |
| Films | Saravanan | Actor |
| Films | Ponvannan | Actor |
| Films | Malathy Lakshman | Singer |
| Films | N. A. Tara | Dance Choreographer |
| Films | Suresh Krishna | Director |
| Folk Arts | K. A. Satyabalan | Folk Singer |
| Other | A. V. Jayaram | Cultural Art Promoter |
| Other | News Ananthan | Journalist |

=== 2015 ===
The individuals listed below were recipients of the Kalaimamani for the year 2015.

| Category | Name | Role / Specialization |
|---|---|---|
| Literature | A. K. P. Kathirvelu | Writer |
| Music | Shyamala Venkateswaran | Vocal |
| Music | A. Vadivelan | Vocal |
| Music | Dr. R. Hemalatha | Violin |
| Music | Tiruvallur Vaidyanathan | Mridangam |
| Music | Geetha Krishnamurthy | Veena |
| Music | T. P. J. Selvarathnam | Nadaswaram |
| Music | M. Mayilswami | Saxophone |
| Music | S. Andrews | Percussion |
| Dance | Sarayu Sai | Bharatanatyam |
| Dance | J. Suryanarayanamurthy | Bharatanatyam |
| Films | Prabhu Deva | Dance Choreographer / Actor |
| Films | A. N. Pavitran | Director |
| Films | Vijay Antony | Film Music Composer |
| Films | R. Rathnavelu | Cinematographer |
| Films | Gana Bala | Singer |
| Films | Yugabharathi | Lyricist |
| Theatre | Maadhu Balaji | Stage Actor |
| Folk Arts | Bharathi Thirumagan | Villupattu |
| Other | Sudha | Transgender Activist |

=== 2016 ===
The individuals listed below were recipients of the Kalaimamani for the year 2015-2016.

| Category | Name | Role / Specialization |
|---|---|---|
| Literature | K. N. Kodandam | Writer |
| Literature | Pavalar K. Guhanandam | Writer |
| Literature | T. Rajagopalan | Religious Discourse |
| Music | Dr. Nirmala Sundararajan | Vocal |
| Music | S. Chandru | Harmonium |
| Music | P. Vijayagopal | Flute |
| Music | M. K. S. Natarajan | Nadaswaram |
| Music | S. Jayachandran | Thavil |
| Music | Padma Shankar | Violin |
| Dance | Jayanthi Ramachandra | Bharatanatyam Teacher |
| Dance | Rajeswari Sainath | Bharatanatyam |
| Theatre | Sri Hari | Stage Producer |
| Theatre | M. Shanmugam | Stage Actor |
| Films | M. Sasikumar | Actor |
| Films | M. S. Bhaskar | Actor |
| Films | Thambi Ramaiah | Actor |
| Films | Soori | Actor |
| Television | Srilekha Rajendran | Actress |
| Folk Arts | Tarapuram C. Kalarani | Folk Singer |
| Other | Nellai Sundararajan | Journalist |

=== 2017 ===
The individuals listed below were recipients of the Kalaimamani for the year 2017.

| Category | Name | Role / Specialization |
|---|---|---|
| Music | S. Sowmya | Vocal |
| Music | Dr. Prema Rangarajan | Vocal |
| Music | R. Suryaprakash | Vocal |
| Music | Dr. T. Lokanatha Sharma | Vocal |
| Music | Sriram Parasuram | Vocal |
| Music | H. Sivaramakrishnan | Ghatam |
| Music | A. N. Bhagyalakshmi | Flute |
| Music | T. K. Ranganatha Pattacharyar | Thavil |
| Music | C. Samudram | Nadaswaram |
| Dance | Roja Kannan | Bharatanatyam |
| Dance | Priya Murali | Bharatanatyam |
| Films | Priyamani | Actress |
| Films | R. S. Jayalatha | Actress |
| Films | Hari | Director |
| Films | Yuvan Shankar Raja | Film Music Composer |
| Films | G.Kalaignanam | Producer |
| Films | Seshadri Nathan Sukumaran | Film Photographer |
| Films | Stills Ravi | Film Photographer |
| Films | G. Sivan Srinivasan | Actor |
| Films | K. Nallasivam | Actor |
| Films | K. R. Singamuthu | Actor |
| Folk Arts | V. Rajaneethi | Silambattam |
| Folk Arts | T. Thavamani | Karakattam |
| Folk Arts | P. Raja | Thappattam |
| Folk Arts | Sujatha Sivaprasad | Villupattu |
| Others | Prakash M. Swami | Journalist |

=== 2018 ===
The individuals listed below were recipients of the Kalaimamani for the year 2018.

| Category | Name | Role / Specialization |
|---|---|---|
| Literature | Professor A. M. James | Author |
| Literature | Dr. S. Amudhakumar | Medical journal writer |
| Literature | Dr. K. Ganesan | Writer |
| Literature | Nirmala Periyaswami | Writer |
| Literature | Manavai Pon. Manickam | Writer |
| Literature | Isaikkavi Ramanan | Poetry |
| Music | S. J. Jananiy | Vocal |
| Music | Lakshmi Mohan | Vocal |
| Music | Vidya Subramanian | Vocal |
| Music | Priya Sisters (Shanmukapriya & Haripriya) | Vocal |
| Music | Rajkumar Bharathi | Vocal |
| Music | S. Manibharathi | Violin |
| Music | Veena M. Raghavan | Veena |
| Music | Thiruppanandhal S. Balasubramaniam | Nadaswaram |
| Music | S. A. Karupayya | Nadaswaram |
| Music | K. Satyanarayanan | Keyboard |
| Music | K. Kumaravel | Thavil |
| Dance | Padmalakshmi Suresh | Bharatanatyam |
| Dance | Nandini Ramani | Bharatanatyam |
| Dance | Lavanya Shankar | Bharatanatyam |
| Dance | Niveditha Parthasarathy | Bharatanatyam |
| Dance | Binesh Mahadevan | Bharatanatyam |
| Dance | Dr. Latha Rajendran | Bharatanatyam |
| Dance | P. Muralidharan | Bharatanatyam |
| Theatre | S. Varadarajan | Stage Actor |
| Films | Unnimenon | Singer |
| Films | Srikanth | Actor |
| Films | Ravi Varman | Cinematographer |
| Films | A. M. Rathnam | Producer |
| Films | Thanjai V. Rajan | Light music |
| Folk Arts | A. Muthulakshman rao | Tholpavai Koothu |
| Folk Arts | P. Muthuchandran | Tholpavai Koothu |

=== 2019 ===
The individuals listed below were recipients of the Kalaimamani for the year 2019.

| Category | Name | Role / Specialization |
|---|---|---|
| Literature | T. Muthukrishnan | Book Author |
| Literature | Dr. Vaigaiselvan | Writer |
| Literature | Avadi Kumar | Writer |
| Literature | Dr. V. Sathyanarayanan | Medical Book Author |
| Music | Anil Srinivasan | Pianist |
| Music | Sikkil S. Gurucharan | Vocal |
| Music | K. Krishnakumar | Vocal |
| Music | Binni Krishnakumar | Vocal |
| Music | Akkara Sisters (S. Subhalakshmi & S. Swarnalatha) | Violin |
| Music | S. Yugarajan | Mridangam |
| Music | Achalpuram S. Chinnathambi | Nadaswaram |
| Music | T.S.D. Selvarathinam | Nadaswaram |
| Music | Thirunageswaram T.R. Subramanian | Thavil |
| Music | Jolly Abraham | Light Music |
| Music | M. J. C. Comagan | Light Music |
| Music | Abhishek Raghuram | Vocal |
| Dance | Madurai R. Muralidaran | Bharatanatyam Teacher |
| Dance | Maya Shyam Sundar | Bharatanatyam Teacher |
| Dance | Parvathi Balasubramanian | Bharatanatyam Teacher |
| Dance | Thoo.Mu. Sridevi | Bharatanatyam |
| Theatre | M.V. Muthu | Stage Actor |
| Theatre | T. Rajendran | Stage Actor |
| Theatre | K. Ramesh (a.k.a) Appa Ramesh | Stage Actor |
| Theatre | T. Srinivasan (a.k.a) Manager Seena | Stage Actor |
| Films | Ramarajan | Actor |
| Films | Liaquat Ali Khan (director) | Director |
| Films | Sujatha Mohan | Singer |
| Films | Devadarshini | Actress |
| Films | Yogi Babu | Actor |
| Films | R. Raghunatha Reddy | Cinematographer |
| Films | Poet Kamakodiyan | Lyricist |
| Films | Kalaipuli S. Thanu | Producer |
| Films | Dhina | Music director |
| Films | Anthony | Editor |
| Films | K. Sivasankar | Dance Choreographer |
| Films | Thalapathy Dinesh | Action Choreographer |
| Films | V.L. Prasad | Tabla player |
| Films | Ananthu | Singer |
| Films | S.Rajendran | Costumer |
| Films | Shanmugam | Makeup |
| Films | Sai Shravanam | Film Sound Engineer |
| Films | Singaravelu | Public Relations officer |
| Films | Manojkumar | Director |
| Television | Shanthi Williams | Actress |
| Television | Nandhakumar | Actor |
| Musical Theatre | K.S. Krishnappa | Stage Actor |
| Musical Theatre | P.S. Muthukrishnan | Stage Actor |
| Musical Theatre | M.P. Jyothi | Stage Actress |
| Folk Arts | A. Arumugam | Theru Koothu |
| Folk Arts | S.P. Muthulakshmi | Villupattu |
| Folk Arts | M. Manjunathan | Pambai |
| Folk Arts | R. Muthukumar | Tholpavai Koothu |
| Folk Arts | K.M. Ganesan | Naiyandi Melam Nadaswaram |
| Folk Arts | V. Laxshmi Ammal | Folk Singer |
| Folk Arts | Ma. Pathirappan | Valli Gummi & Oyilattam |
| Folk Arts | Ka. Thangavelu | Themmangu Singer |
| Folk Arts | P. Chandramohan | Vikadam |
| Folk Arts | R. Mohan | Marakkalattam |
| Other | K.N. Ramaswamy (Bharatiya Vidya Bhavan) | Cultural Art Promoter |
| Other | Ma. Murali | Cultural Art Promoter |

| Category | Name | Role / Specialization |
|---|---|---|
| Dr. J. Jayalalithaa Special Kalaimamani Award | P. Susheela | Singer |
| Dr. J. Jayalalithaa Special Kalaimamani Award | Saroja Devi | Actress |
| Dr. J. Jayalalithaa Special Kalaimamani Award | Dr.Ambika Kameshwar | Dancer |

=== 2020 ===
The individuals listed below were recipients of the Kalaimamani for the year 2020.

| Category | Name | Role / Specialization |
|---|---|---|
| Literature | Trichy K. Kalyanamaram | Spiritual orator |
| Literature | Thamarai Chenthurapandi | Writer |
| Literature | Poet Panapakkam K. Sukumar | Book Author |
| Literature | Dr. Arasu Parameswaran | Public Speaker |
| Literature | M. S. Perumal | Writer |
| Music | Rathnakumari Kalyanasundaram | Vocal |
| Music | Dr. S. Karthik | Gadam |
| Music | V. John Mohan | Harmonium |
| Music | Thanjavur Murugabhoopathy | Mridangam |
| Music | Sairam Sundaram | Mridangam |
| Music | Vaduvur S. N. R. Krishnamurthy | Nadaswaram |
| Music | N. Gothandaraman | Nadaswaram |
| Music | Thirupanandal S. Marimuthu | Thavil |
| Music | M. S. Martin | Keyboard |
| Music | P. Shanmugasundara Desikar | Thirumurai Thevaram Music |
| Music | Ranjani–Gayatri | Vocal |
| Music | Kumari S. V. Usha | Vocal |
| Music | A. G. Govindarasu | Saxophone |
| Music | T. R. Sundaresan | Mridangam |
| Music | Nirmala Rajasekar | Veena |
| Music | Jayalakshmi Sekar | Veena |
| Music | Pandit S. Ballesh and Krishna Ballesh | Shehnai |
| Theatre | Mangalam Natarajan | Stage Actress |
| Theatre | Ja. Pazhani | Stage Actor |
| Theatre | Poovai Mani | Stage Actor |
| Dance | A. Janardhanan | Bharatanatyam |
| Dance | Kavitha Charles | Bharatanatyam |
| Dance | Dr. Srilatha Vinoth | Bharatanatyam Teacher |
| Dance | S. Vijayalakshmi Bhoopathy | Bharatanatyam |
| Dance | Aparna Ramesh | Bharatanatyam |
| Folk Arts | T. Kanniyappan | Theru Koothu |
| Folk Arts | Va. Muthuperumal | Kaniyan Koothu |
| Folk Arts | A. Pazhaniammal | Karagattam |
| Folk Arts | M. S. P. Thangavel | Thappattam |
| Folk Arts | A. M. P. Nagoor Kani | Poikkal Kuthirai |
| Folk Arts | Valliyur M. S. Rasukutty | Naiyandi Melam Nadaswaram |
| Folk Arts | A. Pazhaniapillai | Folk Singer |
| Folk Arts | Mou. Dharmaraj | Oyilattam |
| Folk Arts | Amalapushpam | Folk Singer |
| Folk Arts | T. Govindaraj | Marakkal Aattam |
| Folk Arts | R. Dandapani | Theru Koothu |
| Folk Arts | T. P. Durai | Theru Koothu |
| Folk Arts | Thangal M. Sekar | Theru Koothu |
| Musical Theatre | V. M. Murugappa | Stage Actor |
| Musical Theatre | Prasad V. C. Rajendran | Stage Actor |
| Musical Theatre | K. R. M. Indira | Stage Actress |
| Musical Theatre | K. Tara Khader Khan | Stage Actress |
| Films | Sivakarthikeyan | Actor |
| Films | Aishwarya Rajesh | Actress |
| Films | Madhumitha | Comedian |
| Films | D. Imman | Musician |
| Films | Kaadhal Mathi | Lyricist |
| Films | Ishari K. Ganesh | Producer |
| Films | V. Prabhakar | Dialogue Writer |
| Films | Jaguar Thangam | Action Choreographer |
| Films | Sridhar | Dance Choreographer |
| Films | Sangeetha Krish | Actress |
| Films | Sabitha Joseph | Film Journalist |
| Films | V. Sittrarasu | Photographer |
| Films | A. Sabari Girison | Makeup Artist |
| Films | Gautham Vasudev Menon | Director |
| Films | Ravi Mariya | Actor / Director |
| Films | S. J. Suryah | Actor |
| Television | Nithya Ravindar | Actress |
| Others | Y. Prabhu | Cultural Art Promoter |
| Others | J. Balasubramanian | Cultural Art Promoter |

=== 2021 ===
The individuals listed below were recipients of the Kalaimamani for the year 2021 and announced in September 2025.

| Category | Name | Role / Specialization |
|---|---|---|
| Literature | Ka. Thirunavukarasu | Writer |
| Literature | Nellai Jeyantha | Poet (Classical Tamil) |
| Literature | S. Chandrasekar (a) Thangam battar | Spiritual orator |
| Music | Papanasam Ashok Ramani | Vocal |
| Music | Pa. Sargunathan Othuvar | Thirumurai Thevaram Music |
| Music | T. A. S. Thakesi | Tamil music singer |
| Music | Trichur C. Narendran | Mridangam |
| Music | N. Narasimhan | Kottu Vadhyam |
| Music | K. Pillappan | Nadaswaram Teacher |
| Music | Thirukattupalli T. J. Subramanian | Nadaswaram |
| Music | Kalyanapuram G. Srinivasan | Nadaswaram |
| Music | Tiruvellikeni K. Sekar | Thavil |
| Dance | Vazhuvoor S. Palaniappan | Bharatanatyam Teacher |
| Dance | Priya Karthikeyan | Bharatanatyam |
| Theatre | Poochi S. Murugan | Stage Actor |
| Theatre | Karaikudi Narayanan | Stage Director |
| Theatre | N. A. Alex | Harmonium |
| Films | Super Subbarayan | Action Choreographer |
| Films | M. Jayakumar | Art Director |
| Films | S. J. Suryah | Actor |
| Films | N. Lingusamy | Director |
| Films | Sai Pallavi | Actress |
| Television | P. K. Kamalesh | Actor |
| Musical Theatre | M. P. Viswanathan | Actor |
| Folk Arts | Veera Shankar | Folk singer |
| Folk Arts | Na. Kamatchi | Stilt-horse dance |
| Folk Arts | M. Munusami | Periya Melam |
| Folk Arts | P. Murungan | Naiyandi Melam Nadaswaram |
| Folk Arts | K. K. C. Balu | Valli Oyil Kummi |
| Others | V. Jeevanathan | Fine Arts |

=== 2022 ===
The individuals listed below were recipients of the Kalaimamani for the year 2021-2022 and announced in September 2025

| Category | Name | Role / Specialization |
|---|---|---|
| Literature | Su. Muthu Ganesan | Writer |
| Literature | Santhakumari Sivakadatcham | Public Speaker |
| Literature | Thi. Mu. Abdul Kadhar | Spiritual orator |
| Music | Jeyashree Vaidhyanathan | Vocal |
| Music | Saradha Raghav | Vocal |
| Music | Pagala Ramadas | Violin |
| Music | Neyveli R. Narayanan | Mridangam |
| Music | Sembanarkoil S. G. R. S. Mohandas | Nadaswaram |
| Music | Sithukkadu D. G. Murugavel | Nadaswaram |
| Music | Thirukadaiyur D. G. Babu | Thavil |
| Music | Suchitra Balasubramanian | Harikatha |
| Dance | Amutha Dhandapani | Bharatanatyam Teacher |
| Dance | V. Subramania Bhagavathar | Bhagavata Mela |
| Dance | Swamimalai K. Suresh | Bharatanatyam Vocal |
| Theatre | Pon Sundaresan | Stage Actor |
| Theatre | Poet Ra. Nanmaran | Stage Director |
| Theatre | Solai Rajendaran | Stage Producer |
| Films | Vikram Prabhu | Actor |
| Films | Jaya Guhanathan | Actress |
| Films | Diamond Babu | Public Relations Officer |
| Films | Viveka | Lyricist |
| Films | T. Lakshmikanthan | Photographer |
| Television | Metti Oli Gayathri Shastry | Actress |
| Musical Theatre | N. Sathyaraj | Stage actor |
| Folk Arts | Ranjitha Vel Bommu | Devarattam |
| Folk Arts | Mu. Kalaivanan | Tholpavai Koothu |
| Folk Arts | M. S. C. Radharavi | Thappattam |
| Folk Arts | K. Balu | Naiyandi Melam Nadaswaram |
| Others | K. Loganathan | Fine Arts |
| Others | R. Swaminathan | Art Promoter |

=== 2023 ===
The individuals listed below were recipients of the Kalaimamani for the year 2023 and announced in September 2025

| Category | Name | Role / Specialization |
|---|---|---|
| Literature | Poet K. Jeevabharathi | Poet (Classical Tamil) |
| Music | R. Kasiyap Mahesh | Vocal |
| Music | Hemalatha mani | Veena |
| Music | V. Prabhu | Clarinet |
| Music | P. P. Ravichandran | Nadaswaram |
| Music | Gnana Natarajan | Nadaswaram |
| Music | M. S. R. Parameswaran | Nadaswaram |
| Music | Ramajeyam Bharathi | Thavil |
| Music | Thiru P. Radhakrishnan | Thavil |
| Dance | K. Dhanasundari | Bharatanatyam Teacher |
| Dance | K. Hariprasad | Bharatanatyam Vocal |
| Dance | V. Jayapriya | Kuchipudi Dance |
| Theatre | N. Jothikannan | Stage Actor |
| Theatre | Vanathikathir (alias) P. Kathirvel | Stage Actor |
| Theatre | V. K. Devanathan | Educational Stage Actor |
| Films | K. Manikandan | Actor |
| Films | George Maryan | Actor |
| Films | Anirudh Ravichander | Musician |
| Films | Shweta Mohan | Singer |
| Films | Sandy (A. Santhoshkumar) | Choreographer |
| Films | Nikil Murugan | Public Relations Officer |
| Television | N. P. Uma Shankarbabu | Actress |
| Television | Azhagan Tamilmani | Actor |
| Musical Theatre | A. R. A. Kannan | Stage Actor |
| Musical Theatre | R. M. Tamilselvi | Stage Actress |
| Folk Arts | K. M. Ramanathan | Theru Koothu |
| Folk Arts | T. Jeganathan | Villupattu |
| Folk Arts | C. Mahamani | Naiyandi Melam Thavil |
| Folk Arts | A. Chandrapushpam | Folk Song Researcher |
| Others | S. Deenadayalan | Sculptor |
