= Parvathi Ravi Ghantasala =

Indian Bharatanatyam dancer

- Born: 7 April 1961 (age 65)
- Occupations: Bharatanatyam dancer, choreographer, teacher
- Known for: Founder of Kalapradarshini School of Performing Arts, productions on Ghantasala and Annamayya
- Awards: Kalaimamani Award (1999)

Parvathi Ravi Ghantasala (born 7 April 1961) is an Indian Bharatanatyam dancer, choreographer, and teacher. She founded the Kalapradarshini School of Performing Arts in Chennai and is known for her ballets inspired by the legacy of her father-in-law, the musician Ghantasala Venkateswara Rao, and the saint-poet Annamayya.

== Early life and background ==
Parvathi Ravi Ghantasala was born on 7 April 1961. She is the daughter-in-law of the Telugu musician and composer Ghantasala Venkateswara Rao. Her exposure to music and arts through her family background led her to pursue Bharatanatyam. She trained under gurus in Chennai, including Subramaniya Bharatyar, Thirumoolar Thirumanthiram, and Ananda Natana Prakasam. She holds a B.A. degree.

== Career ==
Parvathi established the Kalasri School of Performing Arts in Chennai, where she teaches Bharatanatyam. She also serves as the Managing Director of Kala Pradarshini in Chennai and has choreographed dance sequences for television. She performed at venues in India and abroad, such as Mahakavi Subramaniya Bharatyar and Thyagaraja, and represented India as a Cultural Ambassador in Europe in 1998.

In 2012, she presented a dance production titled Panchali Sapatham at the Narada Gana Sabha in Chennai, which received positive reviews for its choreography. She created the Annamayya Ballet, a dance production about the 15th-century saint-poet Annamayya, using Bharatanatyam to depict his devotional songs. The production received positive reviews for its choreography.

Another work, the Tribute to Ghantasala, honored her father-in-law Ghantasala and was performed in cities like Coimbatore. Her production Devi – The Divine Power portrayed mythological and historical female figures. She also choreographed Krishna Leela, a ballet about Lord Krishna, The Wheel Turns, which explored themes of life and spirituality, and Postcard for Each Season, which depicted seasonal changes through dance.

Parvathi has performed at festivals like the Margazhi festival in Chennai, organized by the Krishna Gana Sabha. Her work is associated with Bharathiya Vidya Bhavan in Chennai.

== Awards and recognition ==
- 2016: Parvathi received the Natya Kala Ratna from the Krishna Gana Sabha for her excellence in classical dance.
- 1999: Kalaimamani Tamil Nadu State Award for her contributions to the arts.

== Legacy ==
Through her Kalapradarshini School of Performing Arts, Parvathi has trained many students in Bharatanatyam. Her productions focus on themes related to Ghantasala and Annamayya.

== Personal life ==
Parvathi is married to the son of Ghantasala Venkateswara Rao. She resides in Chennai, where she teaches and performs.
