= N. Sailaja =

Indian dancer

Kalaimamani N. Sailaja
- Born: 22 December 1966 (age 59); Chennai, Tamil Nadu, India
- Occupations: Indian classical dancer, choreographer, teacher
- Known for: Contributions to Bharatanatyam and Kuchipudi
- Awards: Kalaimamani Award (2007)

N. Sailaja (born 22 December 1966) is an Indian classical dancer, choreographer, and teacher known for her work in Bharatanatyam and Kuchipudi. Based in Chennai, Tamil Nadu, she trained under K. J. Sarasa and Vempati Chinna Satyam. Sailaja is recognized for her choreography that integrates traditional techniques with contemporary elements and for her efforts in teaching and promoting Indian classical dance.

== Early life and training ==
N. Sailaja was born on 22 December 1966 in Chennai, Tamil Nadu. She began learning Bharatanatyam under K. J. Sarasa and later studied Kuchipudi under Vempati Chinna Satyam. Her training under these gurus provided her with a strong foundation in both dance forms.

== Career ==
Sailaja is a dancer, choreographer, and educator. Her performances in Kuchipudi emphasize traditional techniques while incorporating her own choreography. She founded the Saila Sudha Dance Academy in Chennai in 1988 to teach and promote Indian classical dance. The academy has trained many students and hosts events to encourage appreciation of classical arts, including Sangama, an annual gathering of artists from various disciplines. Sailaja has performed in India and abroad, contributing to the global understanding of Indian classical dance. Her performances are noted for their technical precision and expressiveness. She has also spoken out against practices like "pay-and-perform," which she views as detrimental to the art form. She has developed educational resources for classical dance students, aiding in the preservation of these traditions.

== Awards and recognition ==
Sailaja has received several awards for her contributions to Indian classical dance.

- 2007: Received title of Kalaimamani Award by the Government of Tamil Nadu, which is the highest state honour in the field of Arts
- 2009: Awarded Bharatiya Vidya Bhavan Lifetime Achievement Award
- 2017: Awarded Natya Sudhakara Award from the Government of Tamil Nadu
- 2021: Awarded Sangeet Natak Akademi Award for Kuchipudi,

== Personal life ==
Sailaja is committed to preserving Indian classical dance traditions through her teaching and performances. She supports combining innovation with tradition and has participated in charitable initiatives related to dance.

== Legacy ==
Sailaja’s work as a performer, teacher, and advocate has influenced Indian classical dance, particularly through her academy and performances.
