= Priyadarsini Govind =

Indian classical dancer

- Born: Chennai, Tamil Nadu, India
- Occupations: Classical dancer, choreographer, educator
- Known for: Bharatanatyam, Director of Kalakshetra Foundation (2013–2017)
- Awards: Sangeet Natak Akademi Award (2012), Kalaimamani (1998), Nritya Choodamani (2015)

Priyadarsini Govind is an Indian classical dancer, choreographer, and educator specializing in Bharatanatyam. Based in Chennai, Tamil Nadu, she served as director of the Kalakshetra Foundation from 2013 to 2017 and has performed and taught Bharatanatyam in India and internationally.

== Early life and training ==
Priyadarsini Govind was born in Chennai, Tamil Nadu. She began learning Bharatanatyam at age six and performed her arangetram (debut) at nine. She trained under Kalanidhi Narayanan, focusing on abhinaya, and Swamimalai K. Rajaratnam of the Vazhuvoor school for Nritya. Govind holds a commerce degree from the University of Madras and a diploma in mass communication.

== Career ==
Priyadarsini Govind is a prominent Bharatanatyam dancer known for her precision in Nritya and nuanced abhinaya, often exploring themes of devotion and human emotions in performances like "Krishna Nee Begane Baaro" and Kshetrayya padams. Trained in the Vazhuvoor style, she has choreographed works that incorporate rhythmic variations while preserving traditional forms. She has performed at festivals and venues across India, the United States, Singapore, and Europe. Notable international performances include the Erasing Borders Festival in New York (2012), where she presented a Kshetrayya padam and a thillana, and Navaroz with Natya Dance Theatre in Chicago (2008). She performed solo in Washington, D.C. (2005), showcasing nayika emotions, and collaborated with vocalist T. M. Krishna there in 2012.

From 2013 to 2017, Govind served as director of the Kalakshetra Foundation, the first non-alumnus or non-faculty member in the role. She oversaw arts education, expanded outreach programs, and documented Kalakshetra’s costume and production traditions. She introduced initiatives to promote classical arts in local schools.

Govind has conducted Bharatanatyam workshops and lecture-demonstrations, including at SPIC MACAY events in Madurai and Kodaikanal, emphasizing inclusivity in arts education. In 2022, she collaborated with director Sruti Harihara Subramanian on the dance film Yavanika - The Screen of Illusion, exploring themes of self and illusion, adapted for digital audiences during the COVID-19 pandemic. She has also researched the contributions of devadasis to Bharatanatyam, highlighting their artistic legacy, and discussed art’s role in fostering emotional resilience.

== Awards and recognition ==
Govind has received several awards for her contributions to Bharatanatyam, including:

- Kalaimamani from the Tamil Nadu State Government (1998).
- Sangeet Natak Akademi Award (2012).
- Nritya Choodamani from Sri Krishna Gana Sabha (2015).
- Excellence Award from the Rotary Club of Chennai (2018).

Her work has been recognized for its technical skill and emotional depth.

== Personal life ==
Govind was married to Muktha Govind, a film producer, until his death in 2016. She has emphasized resilience in her career, focusing on her art despite personal challenges.

== Selected works ==
- Yavanika - The Screen of Illusion (2022), a dance film with Sruti Harihara Subramanian.
- Performances of traditional pieces like "Krishna Nee Begane Baaro" and Kshetrayya padams, exploring varied nayika emotions.
- Choreography for Kalakshetra productions, preserving Rukmini Devi Arundale’s vision.
