= Latasana Devi =

Indian Manipuri dancer (born 1967

- Born: Latasana Devi; 1 April 1967 (age 58); Imphal, Manipur, India
- Occupation: Dancer
- Style: Manipuri dance
- Awards: Sangeet Natak Akademi Award (2023)

Latasana Devi is a Manipuri dancer, choreographer, and dance teacher from Imphal, Manipur. She received the Sangeet Natak Akademi Award in 2023 for her contribution to Manipuri dance.

== Biography ==
Latasana Devi was born on 1 April 1967 in Imphal, Manipur. She began learning Manipuri dance at the age of eight and received her early training at the Manipuri Dance Academy in Imphal under the guidance of Guneshwari Devi.

In 1980, she began intensive training under dancers like Padma Shri-winner Darshana Jhaveri, Guru Bipin Singh and Kalavati Devi of Kolkata. Well versed in dance, martial arts, music and drumming, she studied various aspects of Manipuri dance like Kartal Cholom (dance with cymbals) from Oja Chobhal Singh, Nada Seishak (vocal training) from Oja Lakpati Singh and Pung Cholom (drum dance) from Oja Birmangal Singh.

Latasana Devi also completed Bachelor of Arts in Political Science from SNDT University, Mumbai.

== Career ==
Latasana Devi has performed in major dance festivals in India and abroad including Khajuraho Dance Festival, Banaras Ganga Festival, Nishagandhi Dance Festival and Soorya Festival. Other than various venues across India, she has toured to countries like USA, Mexico, Indonesia and Italy for solo performances. In 1994, she was awarded a Junior Fellowship from the Department of Culture, Government of India, to conduct research in the field of classical Manipuri dance. She is a top-grade artist and an empanelled artist of the Indian Council for Cultural Relations. She has also danced at international venues including the BRICS and BRIMTEC summits.

She has choreographed productions like Nachom, Ishano and Madhur Raas in association with the National Centre for the Performing Arts (NCPA), Mumbai.

Latasana Devi founded the Kaina Foundation to raise awareness and promote traditional art forms of Manipur.

== Awards and honors ==
Latasana Devi has received numerous awards and titles including the Sringarmani award in 1985, Guru adhan title conferred by the Tamil Sangam, Mumbai in 2016, and Tarang Ratna title by the Takshashila Nrityakala Mandir, Thane in 2018. She received the Sangeet Natak Akademi Award in 2023 for her contribution to Manipuri dance.
