= Gayan-bayan =

Religious dance of Assam, India

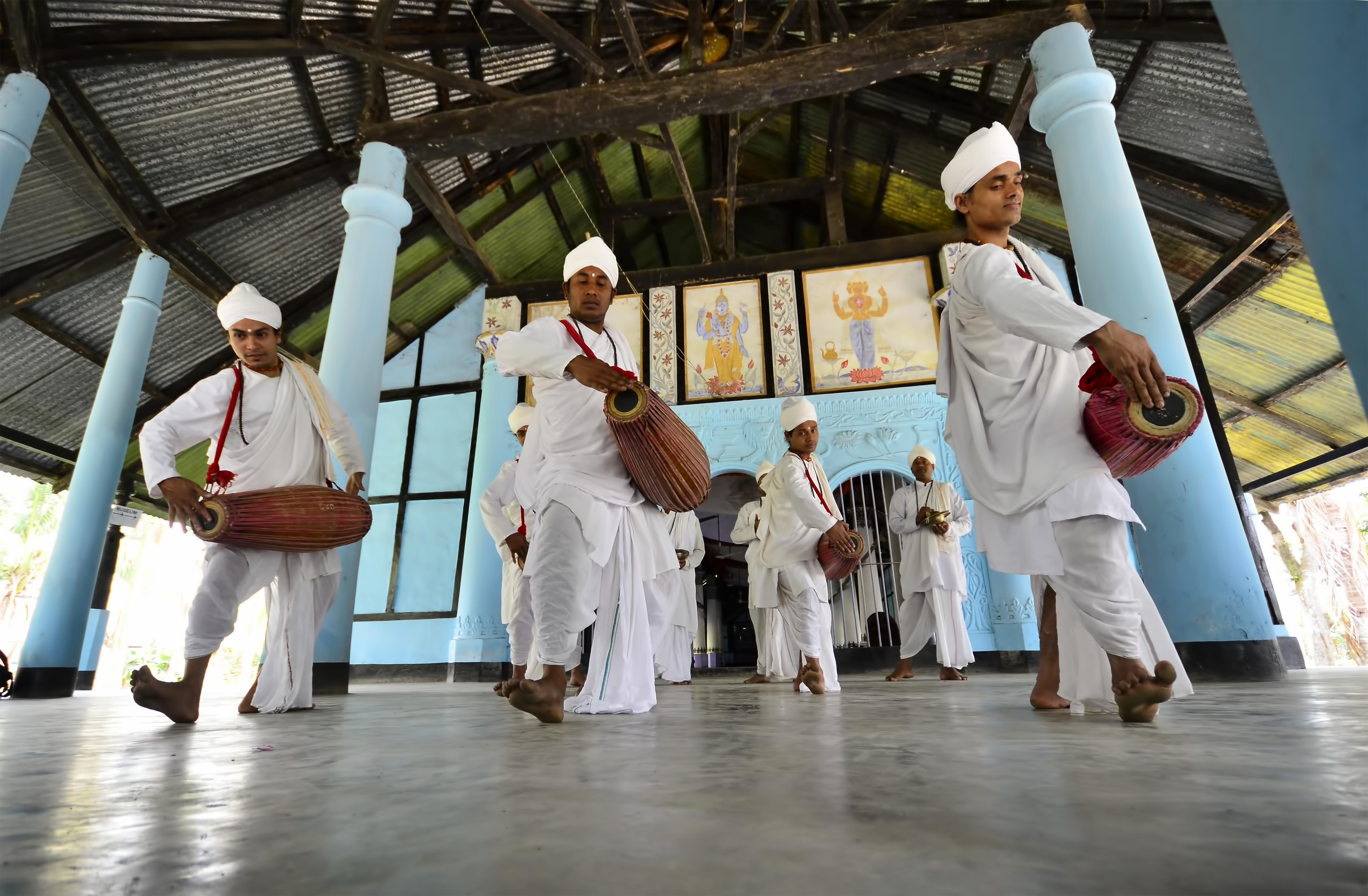
A gāyan-bāyan performance, Majuli, Assam

In Assam, north India, gayan-bayan (gāyan-bāyan) is a religious dance performed by disciples of Sankardev in satras.

The phrase gāyan-bāyan comes from gāyan (‘singer’) and bāyan (‘drummer’). The drums used by the bayan are mainly khols and cymbals are used.

The Gayan bayan may differ according to the different Satras and sects.

== See also ==
- Pung Cholom - Manipur
- Pungmul - South Korea and North Korea
- Khanjluri, Kazbeguri, Khevsuruli and Mtiuluri - Georgia
- Jangi - Azerbaijan
- Yarkhushta - Armenia
- Qilaut - Canada (Nunavut, Northwest Territories and Yukon), United States (Alaska), Denmark (Denmark) and Russia (Chukotka Autonomous Okrug)
- Ritual dance of the royal drum - Burundi
