= Rajkumar Singhajit Singh =

Indian dancer (1931–2024)

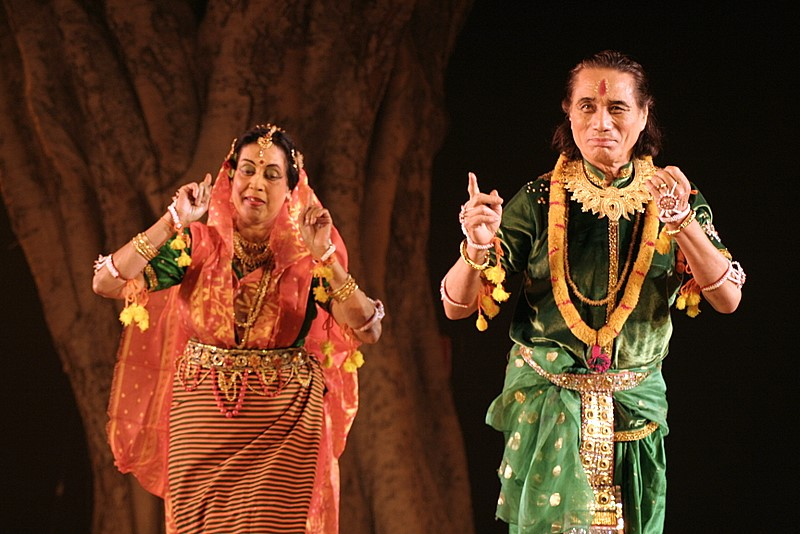
- Singh with his wife Charu Sija Mathur in 2008
- Born: 1 May 1931; Manipur, India
- Died: 23 November 2024 (aged 93)
- Occupations: Classical Indian dancer (Manipuri dance), choreographer, scholar
- Awards: Sangeet Natak Akademi Award; Tagore Award
- Website: www.manipuri-dance.com/index.htm

Rajkumar Singhajit Singh (1 May 1931 – 23 November 2024) was a leading exponent, choreographer and a guru of Indian classical dance form of Manipuri, including the Pung cholom and Raslila. He was awarded the Sangeet Natak Akademi Award in 1984 and the Padma Shri in 1986 for his contribution to the Manipuri dance. In the year 2011, Sangeet Natak Akademi, India's The National Academy for Music, Dance and Drama, awarded him its highest award, the Sangeet Natak Akademi Fellowship for his contribution to Indian Dance. In 2014 he was also conferred with the Tagore Award.

Guru Singhajit Singh and his wife Charu Sija Mathur, who is also a Sangeet Natak Akademi Award recipient, have established, Manipuri Nrityashram, a Manipuri dance school, in New Delhi.

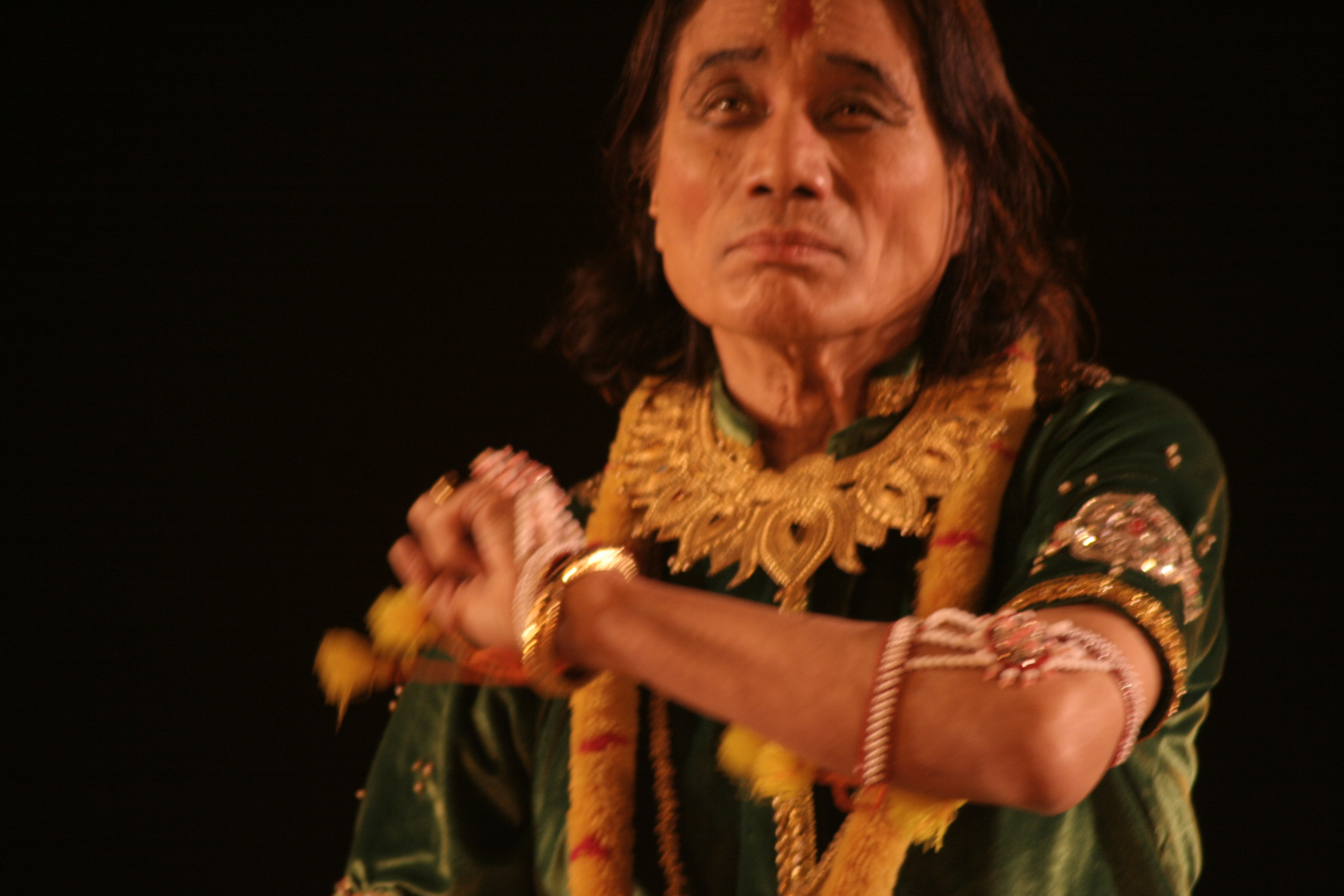
Raj Kumar Singhajit Singh performing in Delhi, 2020

== Biography ==
Rajkumar Singhajit Singh was born in a family of dancers and musicians in Manipur. Early in life, he was fortunate to receive his dance education from the finest gurus of Manipuri dance, starting with ‘Guru Ojha Iboton Singh’ (1942–46) for Pung (drum), followed by ‘Guru Amubi Singh’ (1948–54) – Jagoi; ‘Guru Thambal Angou Singh’ (1950–52) - Kartal Chalom; ‘Guru Chauba Singh’ (1952–53) - Kartal Chalom; and with ‘Guru Ojha Gaura Singh’ (1952–53) from whom he learned the martial arts with Sword & Spear, and soon established himself as a dancer, choreographer and artist of repute.

He joined Triveni Kala Sangam, New Delhi, in 1954, as Head of the Manipur Dance Section, and later in 1962, founded the ‘Triveni Ballet’ of which he was Director and Principal Dancer.

Over the years, he and his dance troupe, have extensively travelled to several countries in Europe, the former USSR, North and South America, Japan, West Asia and Africa. Their recent choreography, Ashta Nayika, has received wide recognition, from both viewers and critics alike.

Singh died on 23 November 2024, at the age of 93.

== Awards ==
- Sangeet Natak Akademi Fellowship (Akademi Ratna), (2011)]
- Homi Bhabha Fellowship (1976–1978)
- Sangeet Natak Akademi Award (1984)
- Padma Shri (1986)
- Delhi Sahitya Kala Parishad Award (1975)
- Fellow of Manipur State Kala Academy
- Manipur Sahitya Parishad Nritya Award (1975)
- Nritya Choodamani from Chennai
- Doctor of Letters (hon.) – North Eastern Hills University
- Tagore Award for cultural harmony, 2014 (awarded in 2018)

== Bibliography ==
- Manipuri by R K Singhajit Singh, Dances of India series, 2004, Wisdom Tree, ISBN 81-86685-15-4.
- The Martial Arts of Asia: Eliminating Violence
