= Berd Dance Ensemble =

Armenian folk dance ensemble

- «Բերդ» պարային անսամբլ
- Formation: 1963
- Founder: Boris Gevorgyan
- Type: Folk dance ensemble
- Location: Yerevan, Armenia
- Artistic Director: Karen Gevorgyan
- Website: Official website

The Berd Dance Ensemble (Armenian: Բերդ պարային անսամբլ) is an Armenian folk and stage dance collective founded in 1963 by Boris Gevorgyan, People's Artist of Armenia. The ensemble performs traditional and staged Armenian dances in Armenia and internationally, and has participated in over 500 international festivals, 1,000 concerts, and performed before audiences of nearly one million people. In 2009, by Presidential Decree N124, the group received the honorary title of Honored Collective of Armenia.

== History and foundation ==
The ensemble was founded in 1963 in Yerevan by Boris Gevorgyan at a time when traditional cultural activity was not widely promoted in Soviet Armenia. It was initially created as a group to preserve Armenian folk dances, later becoming a professional state ensemble. The name refers to the Armenian folk dance Berd ("fortress"), which traces its roots to the province of Vaspurakan and the ritual game Gmbetakhagh ("dome-game").

== Leadership ==
- Boris Gevorgyan — founder and artistic director (1963–1990)
- Karen Gevorgyan — chief ballet master since 1990, Honored Worker of Culture of Armenia, choreographer of more than 50 dances considered classical examples of Armenian stage folk dance
- Stepan Gevorgyan — director and producer, active in expanding the ensemble’s international recognition, also Secretary-General of the Armenian branch of the International Union of Traditional Arts (IGF)

== Artistic approach ==
Since the 1990s, under Karen Gevorgyan, the ensemble has combined preservation of tradition with ethnographic research and staged innovation. The repertoire includes collected dances from different Armenian regions such as Taron, Mush, Vaspurakan, Kharberd, and Homshen. The choreography emphasizes collective strength, symbolism, and national themes, while adapting dances for large-scale stage productions.

== International tours ==
The ensemble has performed in more than 30 countries and participated in over 500 festivals worldwide.

- 1967 — first international appearance in Riga, Latvia, receiving laureate recognition.
- 1993 — 45-day tour of France and Germany, including performances in 16 Armenian-populated cities.
- 1995 — four-month tour in Taiwan, concerts in Taipei’s Sun Yat-sen and Chiang Kai-shek halls.
- 2000 — won the Gold Medal at the Dijon International Festival in France among ensembles from 25 countries.
- 2011 — performed in Russia and China, with concerts at Beijing National Dance Theater.
- 2017 — U.S. tour (Los Angeles, Boston, New York), with full-house audiences.
- 2025 — solo concert at Casino de Paris before 1,500 spectators.
- 2025 — U.S. tour (solo performances in Los Angeles, Chicago, New York).

== Cultural role ==
The ensemble is considered a cultural bridge between Armenia and the diaspora. Its performances are attended both by Armenian communities abroad and international audiences. It has been described by international media as representing Armenian heritage through dance, costume, and symbolism.

== Awards and recognition ==
- Honorary title of Honored Collective of Armenia (2009, Presidential Decree N124).
- Multiple international festival prizes, including Gold Medal at Dijon International Festival (2000).
- Positive critical reception in Taiwan, Italy, Belgium, France, and China.

== See also ==
- Armenian dance
- Culture of Armenia
- Berd (dance)
