= Pung Cholom =

Classical dance form of Meitei culture

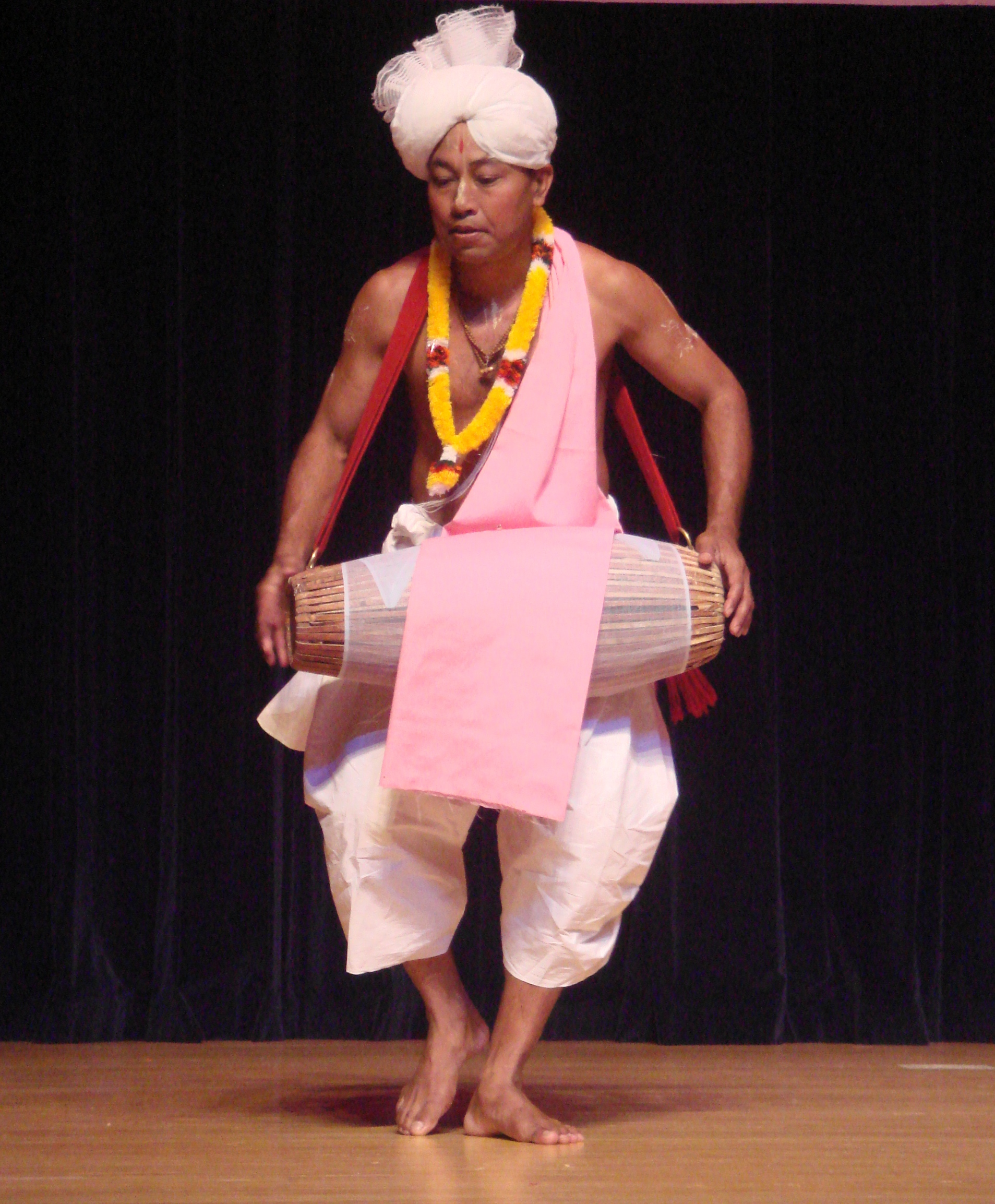
A traditional, Pung cholom performer.

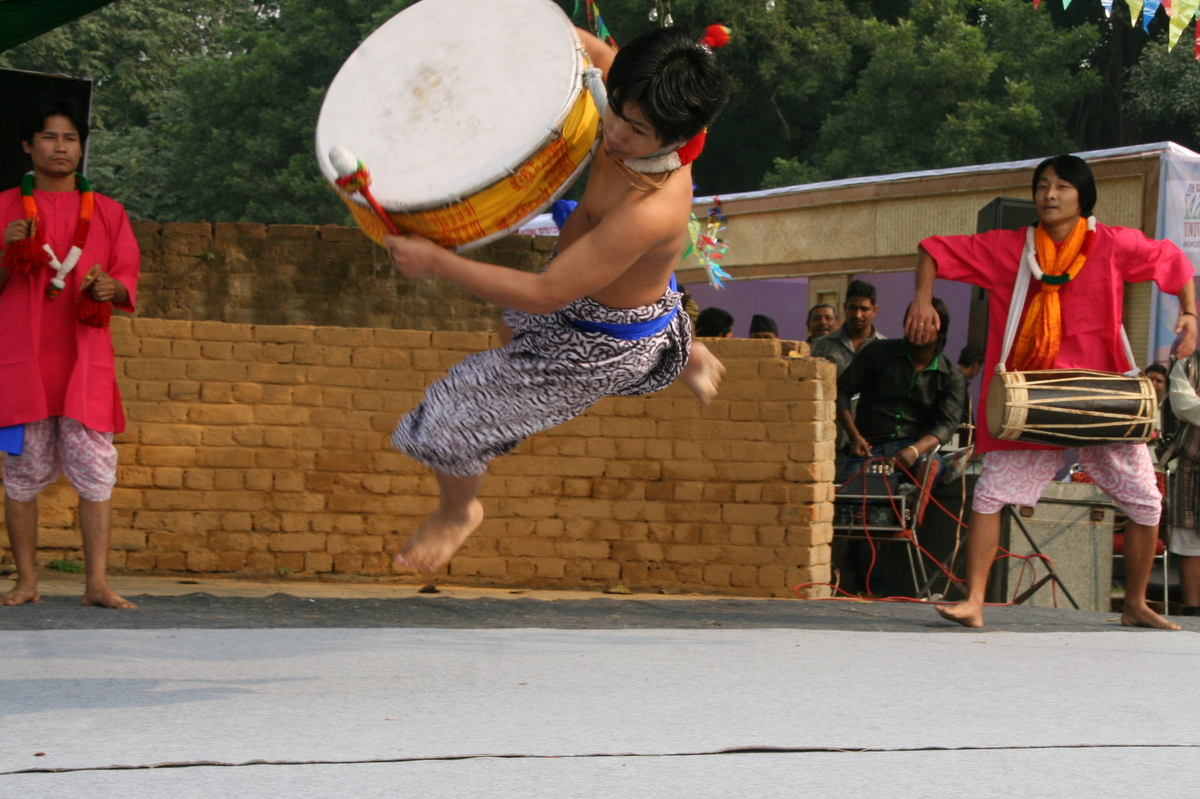
Dancer performing the Pung Cholom

The Pung cholom (Meitei: ꯄꯨꯡ ꯆꯣꯂꯣꯝ, lit. 'roar of the drum') is a traditional Meitei dance form originated from Manipur, which is the soul of the Manipuri Sankirtana music and the Manipuri classical dance. The Pung cholom is a unique classical dance of Manipur. This dance may be performed by men or women and is usually a prelude to the Ras Lila. In this style, the dancers play the pung (a form of hand beaten drum) while they dance at the same time. Dancers need to be graceful and acrobatic at the same time. They use these acrobatic effects without breaking the rhythm or flow of music. The dance is marked by a gentle rhythm, which gradually builds up to a thunderous climax. Pung cholom borrows elements from the Manipuri martial arts, Thang Ta and Sarit Sarak and also from the traditional Maibi Jagoi.

== Function of eyes ==
In Pung Cholom, eyes play a crucial role since every actions are done through vision. There are three different ways of directing the gaze: close (Meitei: ꯑꯅꯛꯄ, romanized: anakpa), or to about 2.6m from the performer, middle (Meitei: ꯃꯌꯥꯏ, romanized: mayāi), about 4.3m, and distant (Meitei: ꯑꯔꯥꯞꯄ, romanized: arāppa), about 6m.

== See also ==
- Pungmul – South Korea and North Korea
- Gayan-bayan – Assam
- Khanjluri, Kazbeguri, Khevsuruli and Mtiuluri – Georgia
- Jangi – Azerbaijan
- Yarkhushta – Armenia
- Qilaut – Canada (Nunavut, Northwest Territories and Yukon), the United States (Alaska), Denmark (Greenland) and Russia (Chukotka Autonomous Okrug)
- Ritual dance of the royal drum – Burundi
