= Berd (dance) =

Folk dance tradition of Armenia

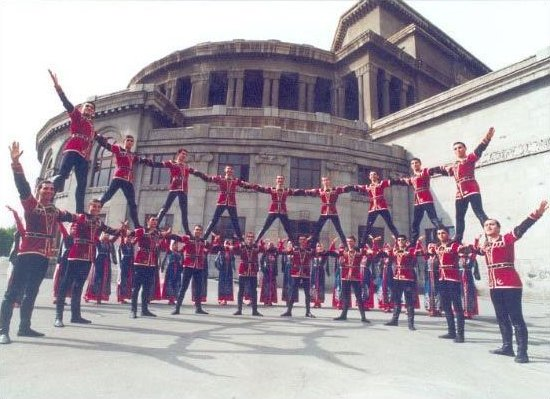
Berd Dance Ensemble

Berd (Armenian: Բերդ, բերդապար (Berd, berdapar), "Fortress") is an Armenian dance which originates from the ancient Armenian province of Vaspurakan of the ancient kingdom of Armenia. The dance was part of the old Armenian game "Գմբեթախաղ (Gmbetakhagh)".

== About ==
During the dance dancers wear only traditional Armenian dress (Armenian: տարազ, taraz). The central objective of the dance is to create a fortress, which is a 2-storey human wall. In order to achieve this, dancers stand on top of each other's shoulders.

== Structure of the Dance ==
- Formation: Two circles of dancers, one standing on the shoulders of the other, linked tightly by arms.
- Movement: The double circle rotates steadily, giving the impression of a moving fortress.
- Music: Typically performed to zurna and dhol (traditional reed and drum), with a strong, martial rhythm.
- Gender roles: Traditionally male; contemporary stage versions sometimes include mixed groups for visual effect.

== Transmission and Performance ==
- In village contexts, Berd was performed at festivals and weddings, often as a demonstration of collective strength.
- Because of the risk involved, the dance was not done casually — it was reserved for occasions requiring a show of stamina and unity.
- Stage adaptation began in the Soviet era, when folk ensembles started presenting regional dances in theaters. Safety adaptations (training, reinforced grips) made repeated performance possible.

== Ensembles and Modern Context ==
- The Berd Dance Ensemble(founded 1963 in Yerevan by Boris Gevorgyan) made the Berd dance its signature stage piece, and the ensemble itself was named after it.
- Armenian State Dance Ensemble, and other ensembles as well have staged Berd, often closing concerts with it as a dramatic highlight.
- In the diaspora, groups in the United States, Lebanon, and France regularly present Berd in cultural festivals, usually in adapted or shortened versions.

== See also ==
- Armenian dance
- Kochari
- Yarkhushta
- Vaspurakan
- Culture of Armenia
