= Guru Bipin Singh =

Indian teacher of Manipuri dance (1918–2000)

- Born: 23 August 1918; Singhari Village Silchar, Assam, British India
- Died: 9 January 2000 (Age 81); Kolkata, India
- Occupation: Dancer
- Style: Manipuri dance
- Awards: Sangeet Natak Akademi Award (1966), Kalidas Samman

Guru Bipin Singh (23 August 1918 – 9 January 2000) was an Indian choreographer, teacher and scholar of Manipuri dance. He is regarded as one of the foremost exponents of the dance form and played a significant role in its preservation, systematisation and promotion during the twentieth century.

Born into a Bishnupriya Manipuri family in Singhari village in present-day Assam, Singh received training in music and dance from an early age and later studied under traditional Manipuri gurus, including Guru Amudon Sharma. Drawing upon diverse traditions of Manipuri dance, he developed a distinctive choreographic and pedagogical approach that contributed to the wider recognition of the art form in India and abroad.

Singh founded the Govindji Nartanalaya in Imphal and the Manipuri Nartanalaya in Kolkata, institutions that became important centres for the teaching and dissemination of Manipuri dance. Through his performances, research, choreography and teaching, he trained several generations of dancers and helped shape a modern tradition of Manipuri dance while maintaining its classical and devotional character.

For his contributions to Indian classical dance, Singh received numerous honours, including the Sangeet Natak Akademi Award and the Kalidas Samman. He is widely regarded as one of the most influential figures in the modern history of Manipuri dance.

== Early life and education ==
Guru Bipin Singh was born on 23 August 1918 in Singhari village near Silchar in present-day Assam into a Bishnupriya Manipuri family. His father, Laikhomsana Singh, was a traditional physician and poet, while his mother, Indubala Devi, was known for her musical abilities. Growing up in a culturally rich environment, Singh developed an interest in music and dance at an early age and received his initial training within the family.

He later underwent formal training in Manipuri dance under Guru Amudon Sharma and studied various traditional forms associated with the dance tradition of Manipur. During his formative years, he also received instruction in Manipuri music, rhythm and performance practices, gaining exposure to both the ritual and theatrical aspects of the art form. His training enabled him to develop a comprehensive understanding of Manipuri dance and laid the foundation for his later work as a performer, choreographer, teacher and scholar.

== Career ==
Bipin Singh began his career as a performer and choreographer at a time when Manipuri dance was largely confined to ritual, devotional and regional contexts. Drawing upon his extensive training in the classical traditions of Manipur, he dedicated himself to the preservation, documentation and promotion of the dance form. Through performances, research and teaching, he sought to present Manipuri dance to wider audiences while maintaining its traditional aesthetic and spiritual foundations.

During the course of his career, Singh studied and synthesized various streams of Manipuri performance traditions, including Ras Leela, Lai Haraoba and Nata Sankirtana. His work contributed to the development of a structured pedagogical system and a distinctive choreographic approach that helped establish Manipuri dance on the national stage. He also collaborated with leading dancers and scholars, notably the Jhaveri Sisters, with whom he worked extensively to popularize the dance form across India and abroad.

Singh founded the Govindji Nartanalaya in Imphal and later established the Manipuri Nartanalaya in Kolkata in 1972. These institutions became important centres for the teaching, research and dissemination of Manipuri dance and produced several notable dancers. Through his institutional work, choreographic productions and training methods, he played a significant role in shaping the modern practice of Manipuri dance while preserving its traditional repertoire.

== Style and contributions ==
Bipin Singh is credited with making significant contributions to the development and popularisation of Manipuri dance in the twentieth century. Drawing upon traditional forms such as Ras Leela, Lai Haraoba and Nata Sankirtana, he developed a systematic approach to training and performance that helped bring the dance form to wider audiences while retaining its classical character.

Through extensive research and fieldwork, Singh documented traditional repertories, movement vocabulary and musical practices associated with Manipuri dance. His choreographic works combined elements of ritual, devotional and theatrical traditions, contributing to the evolution of a distinct performance style that came to be associated with the Bipin Singh school of Manipuri dance.

Singh also played an important role in developing the solo repertoire of Manipuri dance and in adapting traditional compositions for the proscenium stage. Through his teaching, publications and institutional initiatives, he contributed to the preservation and transmission of Manipuri dance traditions to future generations. His work remains influential in contemporary Manipuri dance practice.

== Disciples ==
Throughout his career, Bipin Singh trained numerous dancers who later became prominent exponents of Manipuri dance. His teaching methods, which combined traditional instruction with a systematic approach to choreography and performance, influenced several generations of performers.

Among his most notable disciples were the Jhaveri Sisters: Nayana Jhaveri, Ranjana Jhaveri, Suverna Jhaveri and Darshana Jhaveri who played a significant role in popularising Manipuri dance in India and internationally. Singh worked closely with them in the development and presentation of numerous choreographic productions based on the Manipuri classical tradition.

Other dancers associated with his training and artistic guidance included Kalavati Devi, Guneswori Devi, Binodini Devi, Priti Patel, Poushali Chatterjee and Latasana Devi, as well as several students of the institutions founded by him.

== Awards and honours ==
Bipin Singh received several honours and awards in recognition of his contributions to Manipuri dance and Indian classical performing arts. These include:

- Hanjaba, a title conferred by the Maharaja of Manipur.
- Sangeet Natak Akademi Award (1966).
- Sharangadev Fellowship awarded by Sur Shringar Samsad.
- Kalidas Samman awarded by the Government of Madhya Pradesh. The award records of the Government of Madhya Pradesh list Bipin Singh among the recipients in the field of classical dance for 1989–90.
- Anamika Kala Sangam Award, Kolkata.
- Shiromoni Purashkar awarded by Asian Paints, Kolkata.

== Legacy ==
Guru Bipin Singh is regarded as one of the principal figures in the modern development of Manipuri dance. Through his choreography, teaching, research and institutional work, he contributed significantly to the preservation and dissemination of the dance form. The institutions founded by him continue to promote Manipuri dance through performances, publications, research and training programmes.

His birth centenary was commemorated through workshops, seminars, lecture-demonstrations and performances in India and abroad, reflecting his continuing influence on generations of Manipuri dancers and scholars.
