= Nishagandhi Dance Festival =

Annual classical dance festival in India

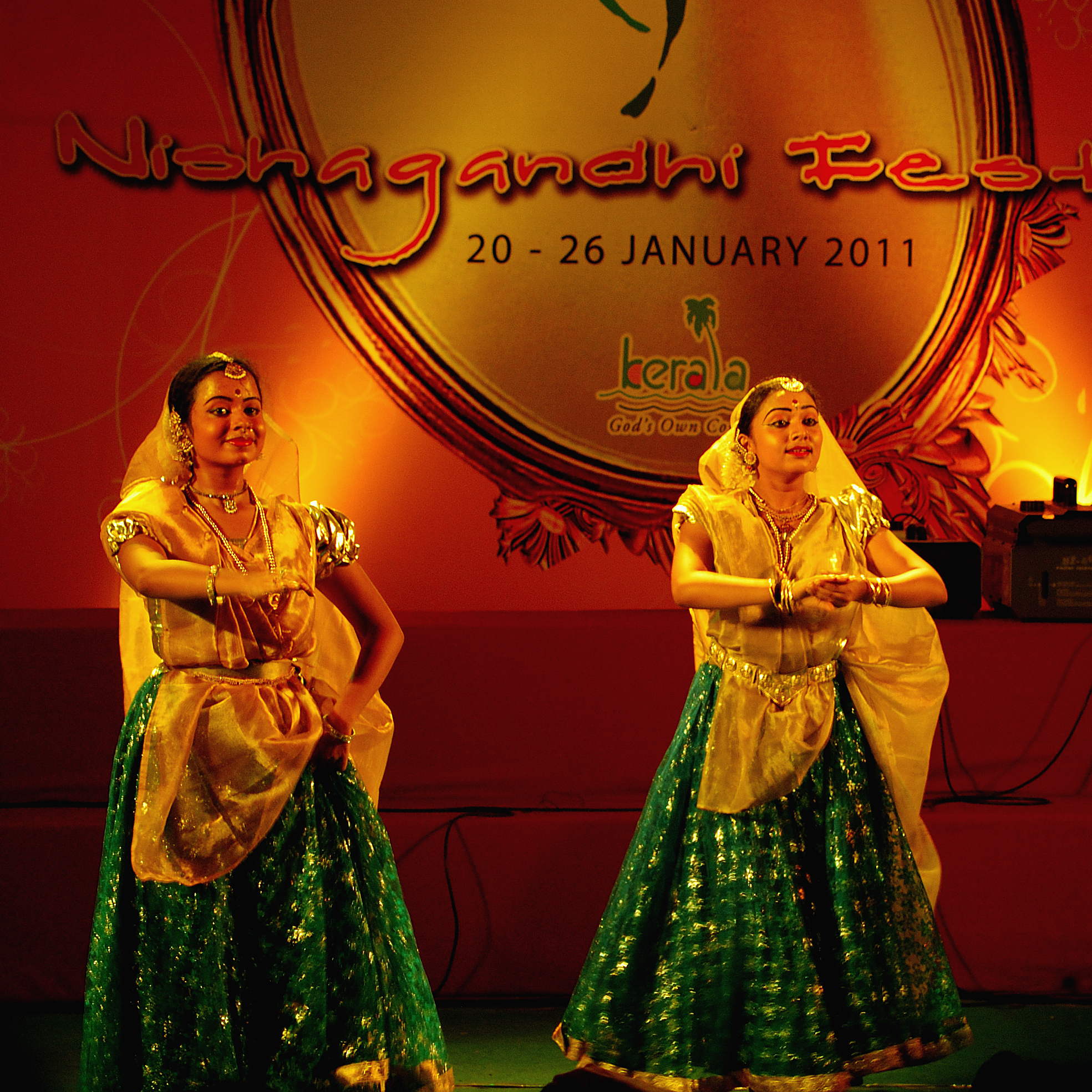
- Nishagandhi Dance Festival
- Status: Active
- Genre: Dance Festival
- Frequency: Annually
- Venue: Nishagandhi Auditorium
- Locations: Kanakakkunnu Palace, Thiruvananthapuram, Kerala
- Country: India
- Years active: 32–33
- Inaugurated: 1993
- Most recent: 13 February 2026 – 20 February 2026
- Major events: Indian Classical Dance Performances
- Patron: Department of Tourism (Kerala)

Nishagandhi Dance Festival, organised by the Kerala Tourism Department, is a one-week festival of classical dances held annually in the Nishagandhi amphitheatre, Kanakakkunnu Palace, Thiruvananthapuram. It usually happens in the months of January - February, every year.

The festival highlights the richness of the Indian classical dance styles such as Kathak, Bharatanatyam, Odissi, Kuchipudi, Manipuri and Kathakali with performances of some of the best exponents in the field. In addition, a Kathakali fest is also conducted inside the Palace.

The Nishagandhi Puraskaram or Nishagandhi award has been presented during the festival since 2013. Mrinalini Sarabhai, Bharatanatyam dancer, was the first winner of the award.
