= Tagore Award =

The Tagore Award is an award given in commemoration of the 150th birth anniversary of the Nobel laureate Rabindranath Tagore (1861–1941) for cultural harmony. Established in 2011 by Government of India, it is given for outstanding achievement in fostering harmony and universalism and values of cultural harmony especially in conflict or extreme situations through innovative systems/strategies and which have an enduring and transformational impact. This award carries an amount of Rupees One Crore (ten million rupees, convertible to foreign currency), a Citation in a Scroll, a Plaque as well as an exquisite traditional handicraft/handloom item. The first award was given in 2012 to Pandit Ravi Shankar by the President of India Pranab Mukherjee. Ravi Shankar died before he could receive the award which was received by his wife Sukanya Shankar.

Music conductor Zubin Mehta received the Tagore Award For Cultural Harmony for the year 2013 in recognition of his outstanding contribution to cultural harmony. On 6 September 2013, President of India Pranab Mukherjee conferred the Tagore Award 2013 to Zubin Mehta at a ceremony held at Rashtrapati Bhawan, New Delhi.

== Recipients ==
Indicates a posthumous award for that year

Tagore Award for 2019 is given to Yohei Sasakawa, goodwill ambassador of World Health Organization.

S.No.	Year	Recipient	Image	Birth / death	Country	Description
1	2012	Pandit Ravi Shankar		1920–2012	India	Hindustani classical composer
2	2013	Zubin Mehta		1936–	India	Western classical conductor
3	2014	Rajkumar Singhajit Singh		1931–2024	India	The doyen of Manipuri dance
4	2015	Chhayanaut		1961–	Bangladesh	A cultural organization of Bangladesh
5	2016	Ram V. Sutar		1925–2025	India	Prime architect of Statue of Unity, the tallest statue in the world
6	2020	Raj Kamal Jha		1966-	India	For book "The city of the sea".
