= Lorke =

Folk dance tradition from Armenia

- Native name: Լորկե
- Genre: Traditional dance
- Time signature: 2/4, 8/8
- Origin: Armenian highlands

Lorke (Armenian: Լորկե) is an Armenian folk song-dance. It was performed at weddings when the bride was taken away from her father's house, at the Vardavar festival during the collection of flowers, and also during pilgrimages. It also refers to various types of Armenian collective dances.

There are also Shatakh and Talin (such as Shurjpar - “circle dance”) versions of the song-dance

== Etymology and origin ==
Initially, the dance was a ritual and was associated with Armenian mythology. Lorke goes back to totemic dances in honor of quails. The name comes from Arm. լոր [lor] - "quail".

Probably originated from Van and Alashkert region.

== Lyrics ==
Լորկե, Լորկե, Լորկե, Լորկե, Խանըմե Լորկե,
Լորկե, Լորկե, Լորկե, Լորկե, Խաթունե Լորկե,
Լորկե, Լորկե, Լորկե, Լորկե, Շեկ աղջիկ Լորկե:

Ելանք, հասանք տուն Ամարանց, Խանըմե Լորկե,
Բերին սպիտակ լավաշ ու հաց, Խաթունե Լորկե,
Լորկե, Լորկե, Լորկե, Լորկե, Շեկ աղջիկ Լորկե:

(Van version)
