= Manipuri dance =

Classical dance of India

Manipuri Raas Leela (Meitei: Jagoi Raas/Raas Jagoi)
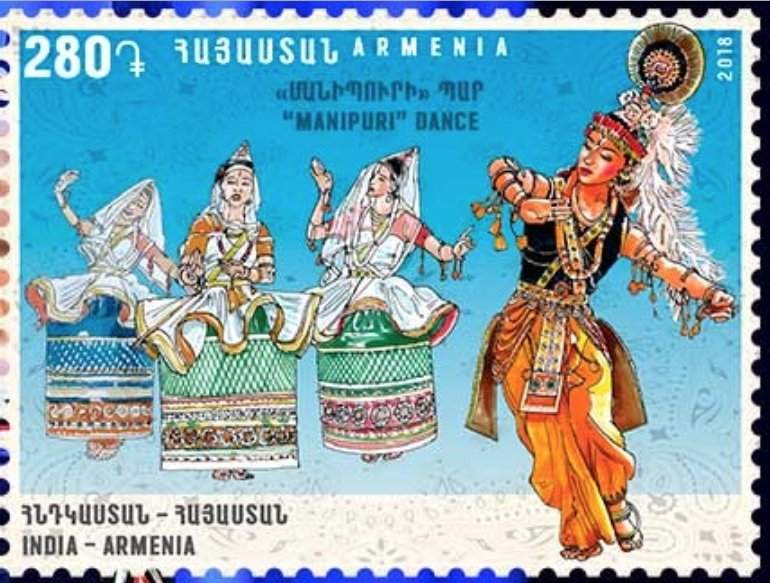
- An illustration of the Manipuri Raas Leela dance, being depicted in a stamp from Armenia
- Native name: Meitei: Jagoi Raas, Raas Jagoi
- Genre: Jagoi; Indian classical dance
- Inventor: Rajarshi Bhagyachandra (Meitei: Ching-Thang Khomba)
- Origin: Manipur kingdom (historical); Manipur, India (current)

Manipuri dance, sometimes also referred to as the Manipuri Raas Leela (Meitei: Jagoi Raas/Raas Jagoi), is a jagoi and is one of the major Indian classical dance forms, originating from the state of Manipur. It is one of the Meitei intangible cultural heritage. The "Manipuri dance" is a confluence of four ritualistic traditions – Lai Haraoba, Huyen Langlon, Meitei Nata Sankirtana and Raaslila. Owing to the Meitei civilization, the classical dance form, first formally developed by Meitei Hindu king Ching Thang Khomba (Meitei for 'Rajarshi Bhagyachandra') of the Kingdom of Manipur, is considered to be the highest spiritual expression of the worship of Hindu deity Krishna. The themes of this dance are generally taken from episodes in the life of Krishna. Owing to its huge influences on the diverse cultural heritages across the Indian subcontinent, it is recognised by the Sangeet Natak Akademi of the Ministry of Culture of the Government of India as one of the few primary classical dance forms of the Republic of India, and is honoured with the Sangeet Natak Akademi Award for Manipuri annually. It is referred to as the "national dance" during the Armenia-India joint issue of postage stamps, as a part of the Armenia-India international relations. This dance form was patronized by many Manipuri rulers. In the 20th century, it became a popular dance in Bengal

It is imbued with the devotional themes of Madhura Raas of Radha-Krishna and characterised by gentle eyes and soft peaceful body movements. The facial expressions are peaceful mostly expressing Bhakti Rasa or the emotion of devotion, no matter if a dancer is Hindu or not. The dance form is based on Hindu scriptures of Vaishnavism and is exclusively attached to the worship of Radha and Krishna. It is a portrayal of the dance of divine love of Krishna with goddess Radha and the cowherd damsels of Vrindavan, famously known as the Raas Leela.

Kapila Vatsyayan said ‘Manipuri may be described as a dance form which is at once the oldest and the youngest among the classical dances’ signifying the ever changing structures of Manipuri dance.

The roots of the Manipuri Raas Leela dance, as with all classical Indian dances, is the ancient Hindu Sanskrit text Natya Shastra, with influences and the cultural fusion of the traditional Meitei art forms. At a time when other Indian classical dances were struggling to shake off the stigma of decadent crudity and disrepute, the Manipuri classical dance was a top favorite with girls of 'respectable' families. This Manipuri dance drama is, for most part is entirely religious and is considered to be a purely spiritual experience. It is accompanied with devotional music created with many instruments, with the beat set by cymbals (kartal or manjira) and double-headed drum (pung or Manipuri mrdanga) of sankirtan. The dance drama choreography shares the plays and stories of Vaishnavite Padavalis, that also inspired the major Gaudiya Vaishnavism-related performing arts found in Assam and Bengal.

== Identity ==
Though the term Manipuri Dance is more commonly associated with the Raslila, its identity is also related to the Jagoi (the Raas and the Lai Haraoba), the Pung Cholom and the Thang Ta (a combat form of Huiyen Lallong). To certain extent, Meitei Nat Sankirtana, a traditional Meitei form of Kirtan, is also related to its identity.

== History ==
The first reliably dated written texts describing the art of Manipuri dance are from the early 18th century.

=== Medieval period ===
Historical texts of Manipur have not survived into the modern era, and reliable records trace to the early 18th century. Theories about the antiquity of Manipuri Raas Leela dance rely on the oral tradition, archaeological discoveries and references about Manipur in Asian manuscripts whose date can be better established.

The Meitei language text Bamon Khunthok, which literally means "Brahmin migration", states that Vaishnavism practices were adopted by the king of Manipur in the 15th century CE, arriving from Shan Kingdom of Pong. Further waves of Buddhists and Hindus arrived from Assam and Bengal, after mid 16th-century during Hindu-Muslim wars of Bengal Sultanate, and were welcomed in Manipur. In 1704, the Meitei King Pitambar Charairongba (Meitei: Charairongba) adopted Vaishnavism, and declared it to be the state religion. In 1717, the Meitei King Gareeb Nawaz (Meitei: Pamheiba) converted to Chaitanya style devotional Vaishnavism, which emphasized singing, dancing and religious performance arts centered around Hindu god Krishna. In 1734, devotional dance drama centered around Hindu god Rama expanded Manipuri dance tradition.

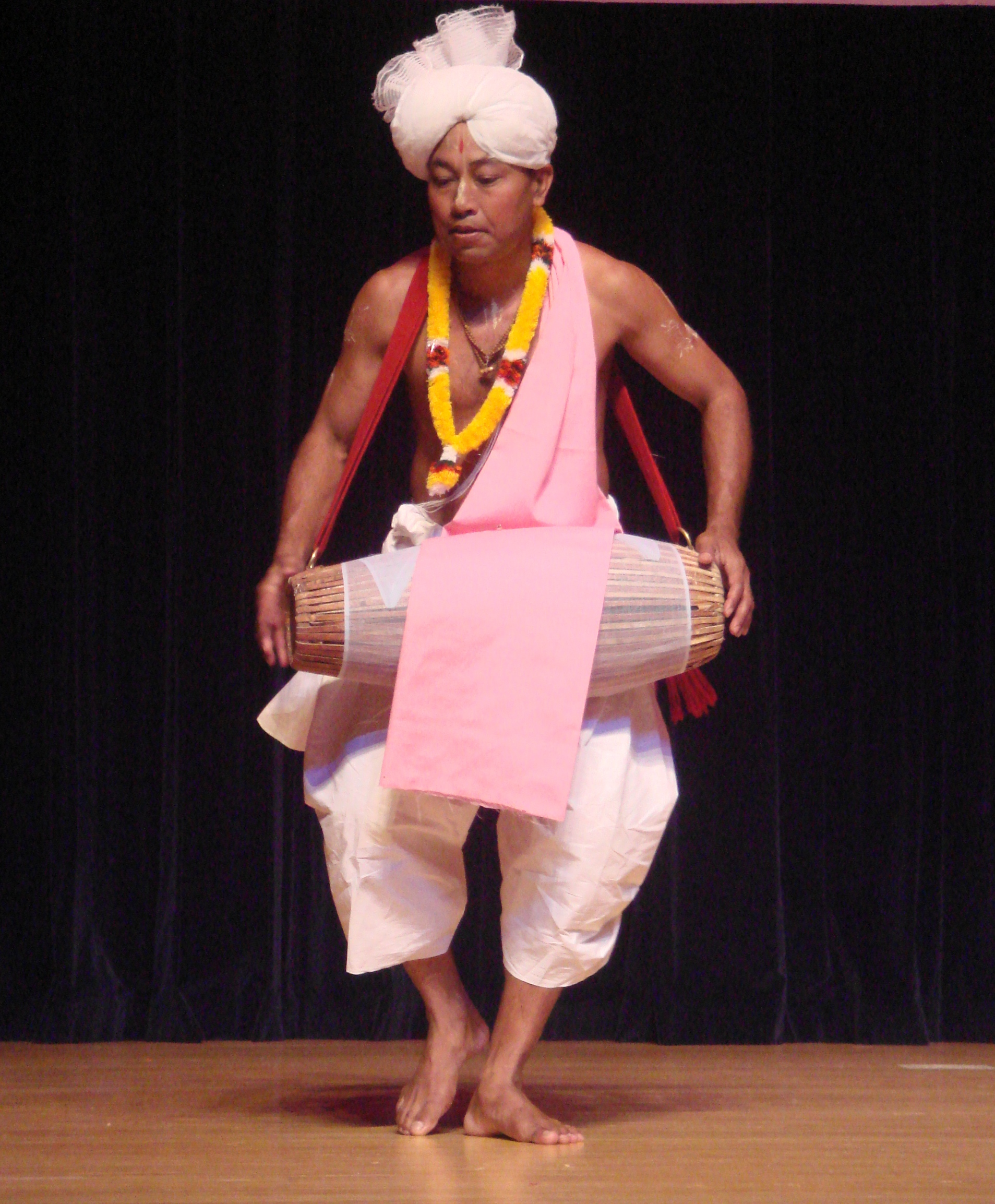
A Manipuri dance musician playing pung cholom. The 19th century musician and Hindu Meitei king Chandra Kirti wrote sixty four drum dances.

Meitei King Rajarshi Bhagyachandra (Meitei: Ching-Thang Khomba) (r. 1759–1798 CE) of Manipur State adopted Gaudiya Vaishnavism (Krishna oriented), documented and codified the Manipuri dance style, launching the golden era of its development and refinement. He composed three of the five types of Raas Leelas, the Maha Raas, the Basanta Raas and the Kunja Raas, performed at the Sri Sri Govindaji temple in Imphal during his reign and also the Achouba Bhangi Pareng dance. He designed an elaborate costume known as Kumil (the cylindrical long mini-mirror-embellished stiff skirt costume, that makes the dancer appear to be floating). The Govinda Sangeet Lila Vilasa, an important text detailing the fundamentals of the dance, is also attributed to him. Rajarshi Bhagyachandra is also credited with starting public performances of Raas Leela and Manipuri dances in Hindu temples.

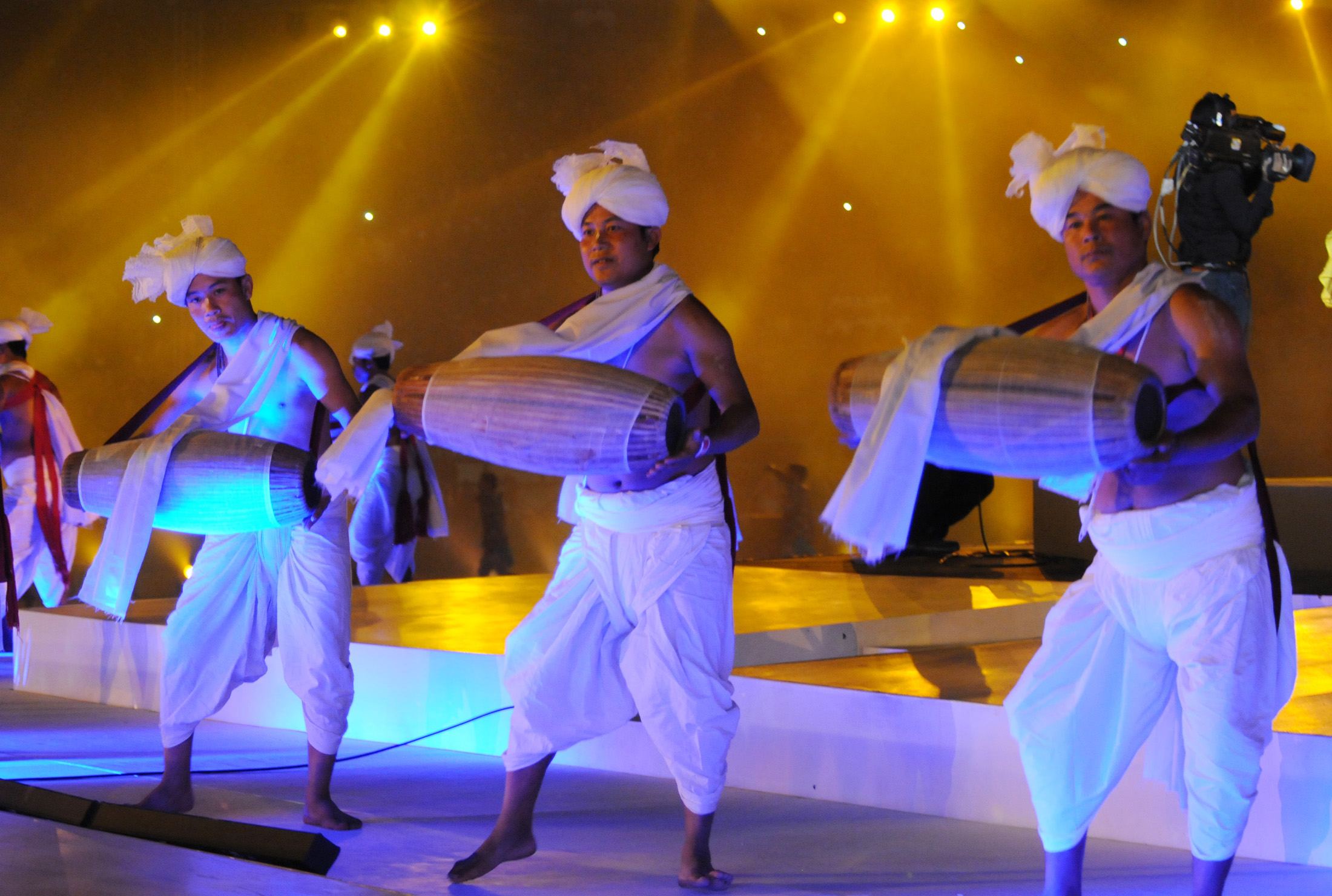
Pung Cholom performance in 2016

Meitei King Gambhir Singh (Meitei: Chinglen Nongdrenkhomba) (r. 1825–1834 CE) composed two parengs of the tandava type, the Goshtha Bhangi Pareng and the Goshtha Vrindaban Pareng. King Chandrakirti Singh (r. 1849–1886 CE), a gifted drummer, composed at least 64 Pung choloms (drum dances) and two parengs of the Lasya type, the Vrindaban Bhangi Pareng and Khrumba Bhangi Pareng. The composition of the Nitya Raas is also attributed to these kings.

=== British ruling period ===
In 1891, the British colonial government annexed Manipur into its Empire, marking an end to its golden era of creative systematization and expansion of Manipuri dance. The Manipuri Raas Leela dance was thereafter ridiculed as immoral, ignorant and old-fashioned, like all other classical Hindu performance arts. The dance and artists survived only in temples, such as in Imphal's Shree Govindajee Temple. The cultural discrimination was resisted and the dance revived by Indian independence movement activists and scholars.

=== Modern era ===
The classical Manipuri Raas Leela dance genre got a second life through the efforts of the Noble Laureate Rabindranath Tagore. In 1919, he was impressed after seeing a dance composition of Goshtha Lila in Sylhet (in present-day Bangladesh). He invited Guru Budhimantra Singh who had trained in Manipuri Raas Leela dance, as faculty to the Indian culture and studies center named Shantiniketan. In 1926, Guru Naba Kumar joined the faculty to teach the Raas Leela. Other celebrated Gurus, Senarik Singh Rajkumar, Nileshwar Mukherji and Atomba Singh were also invited to teach there and assisted Tagore with the choreography of several of his dance-dramas.

== Status and significance ==
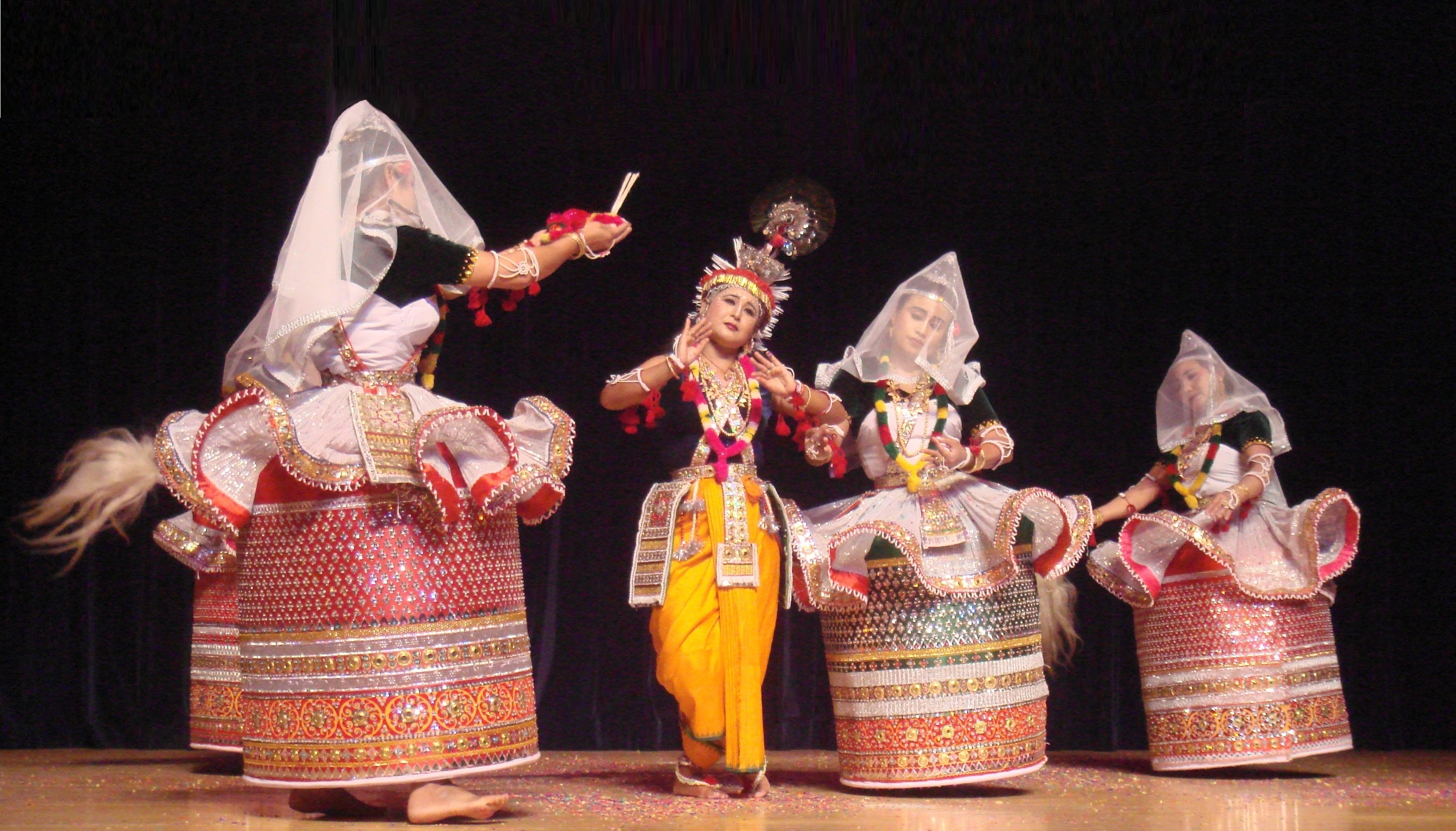
Manipuri Raas Leela dancers in traditional costumes.

=== In Hindu world ===
The Manipuri classical dance form, which is a masterpiece of Meitei Hindu king Ching Thang Khomba (Meitei for 'Rajarshi Bhagyachandra') of the historical Kingdom of Manipur, is regarded as the highest spiritual expression of the worship of Hindu deity Krishna.

=== In India ===
Native to the Meitei civilization of Manipur, India, having significant cultural influences on the different civilizations across the Indian subcontinent, the Manipuri classical dance is recognised by the Sangeet Natak Akademi of the Ministry of Culture of the Government of India as one of the few primary classical dance forms of the Republic of India. At the same time, it is annually honoured with the Sangeet Natak Akademi Award for Manipuri.

=== In Bangladesh ===
According to Banglapedia, the national encyclopedia of Bangladesh, the importance of Manipuri classical dance in Meitei civilization is described as follows:

“Dance and music play a vital role in the life span of Manipuri people. The most flourishing branch of Manipuri culture is dance. The Manipuri synonym of dance is jagoi and in this dance, body movements create either circle or ellipse. Rasa dance is the finest product of Manipuri culture. Maharaj Bhagyachandra innovated it and it was first performed in Manipur in 1779 in the fullmoon of Kartik.”

— Banglapedia

== Repertoire ==
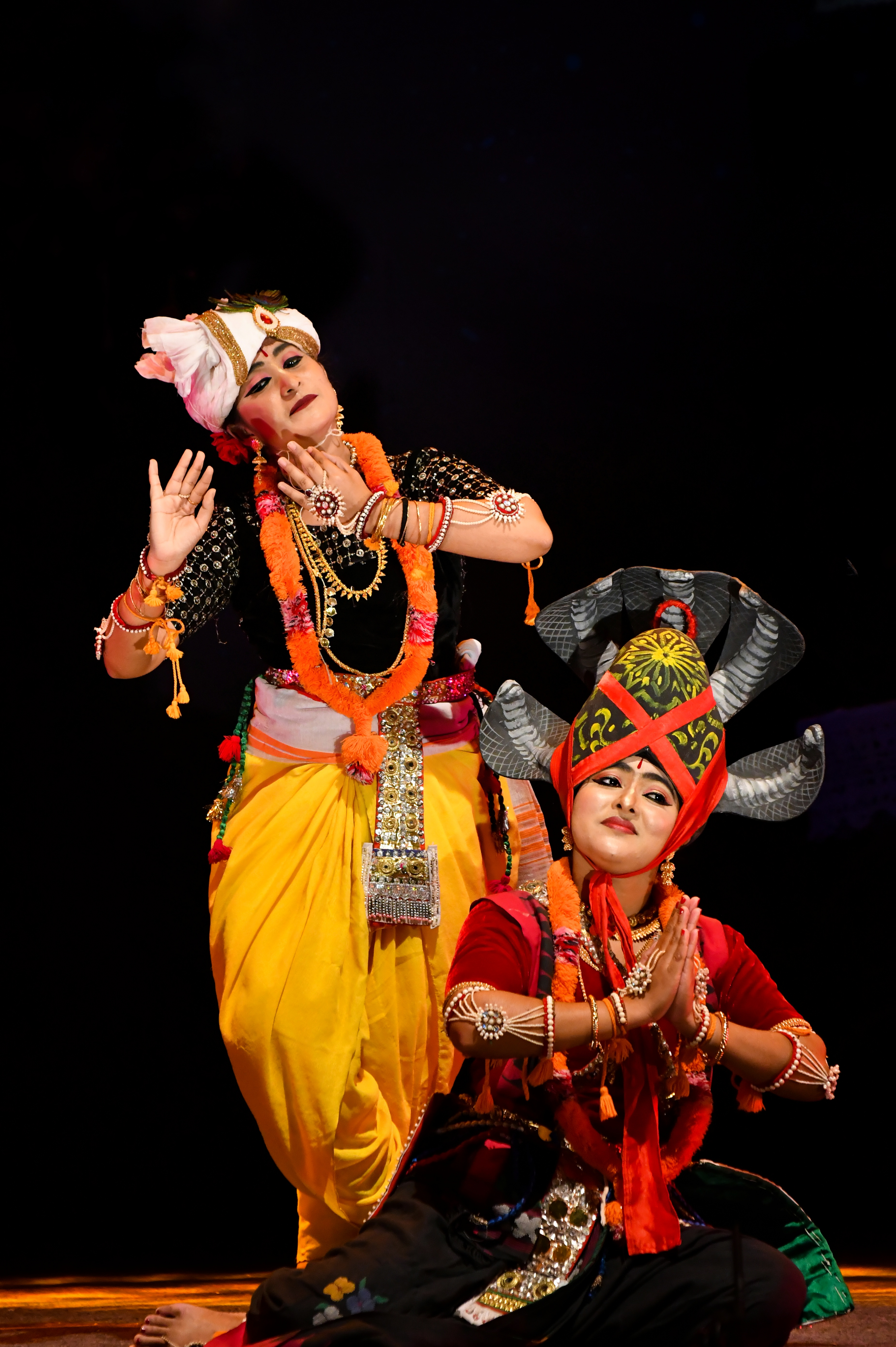
Kaaliyamardana

Chali or Chari is the basic dance movement in Manipuri Raas dances. The repertoire and underlying play depends on the season. The dances are celebrated on full moon nights, three times in autumn (August through November) and once again in spring (March or April). The Basanta Raas is timed with the Hindu festival of colors called Holi, while others are timed with post-harvest festivals of Diwali and others. The plays and songs recited during the dance performance center around the love and frolics between Radha and Krishna, in the presence of Gopis named Lalita, Vishakha, Chitra, Champaklata, Tungavidya, Indurekha, Rangadevi and Sudevi. There is a composition and dance sequence for each Gopi, and the words have two layers of meanings, one literal and other spiritual. The longest piece of the play focusses on Radha and Krishna. The dancer playing Krishna expresses emotions, while the body language and hand gestures of the Gopi display their feelings such as longing, dejection or cheer.

The rhythmic depiction form of abhinaya[acting] is to show the ashtanayika [eight shades of a heroine] in every nayika, which are colored by the scenes of the season in which the "abhisarika" expresses her love for Krishna; so that a kuaasha abhisarika who dances in the foggy winter is very different to the varsha abhisarika who faces the thunderous downpouring rain.

In other plays, the Manipuri dancers are more forceful, acrobatic and their costumes adjust to the need of the dance. Dozens of boys synchronously dance the Gopa Ras, where they enact the chores of daily life such as feeding the cows. In Uddhata Akanba, states Ragini Devi, the dance is full of vigor (jumps, squats, spins), energy and elegance.

== Costumes ==
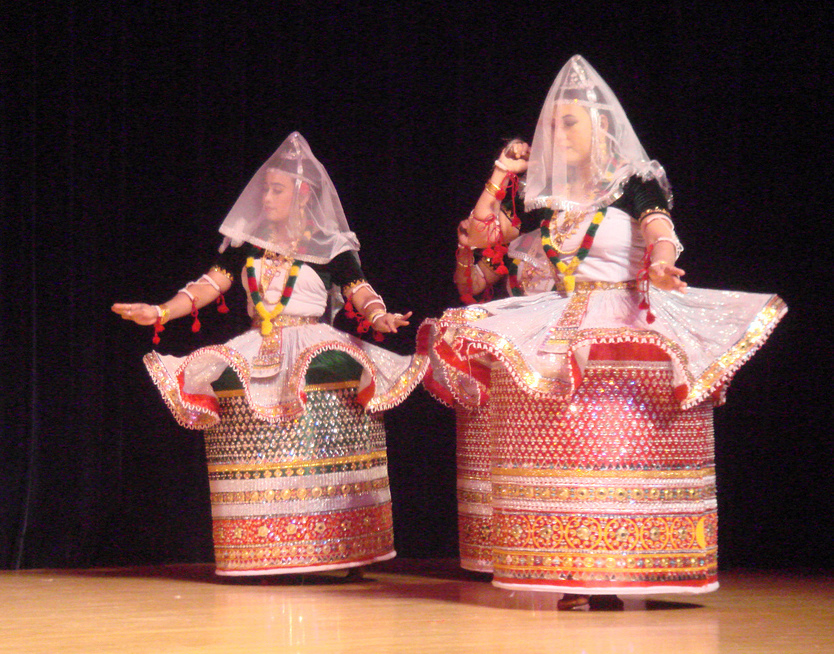
Female dancers in potloi costumes — Radha is in green coloured potloi while the other gopis wear red.

The classical Manipuri dance features unique costumes. The women characters are dressed, in doll-like Potloi costumes. The brilliant design of the Potloi was conceived in a dream by Vaishnavite Meitei King Rajarshi Bhagyachandra, in which he saw his daughter dancing in a Potloi. The Potloi costumes for women are tailored such that it is avoids arousal of any unhealthy stimulus in the audience.

=== Female garments ===
Kumin is an elaborately decorated barrel shaped long skirt stiffened at the bottom and close to the top. The decorations on the barrel include gold and silver embroidery, small pieces of mirrors, and border prints of lotus, Kwaklei orchid, and other items in nature.

The dancers do not wear bells on ankles but do wear anklets and foot ornaments. Manipuri dance artists wear kolu necklaces on the neck and adorn the face, back, waist, hands and legs with round jewellery ornaments or flower garlands that flow with the dress symmetry. The face is decorated with the sacred Gaudiya Vaishnava Tilak on the forehead and Gopi dots made of sandalwood above the eyebrows. The symmetrical translucent dress, states Reginald Massey, makes "the dancers appear to float on the stage, as if from another world".

Koknam (gauze oveerhead, embossed with silver zari), Koktombi (cap covering the head) and Meikhumbi (a transparent thin veil) thrown over the head to symbolically mark elusiveness.

=== Male garments ===
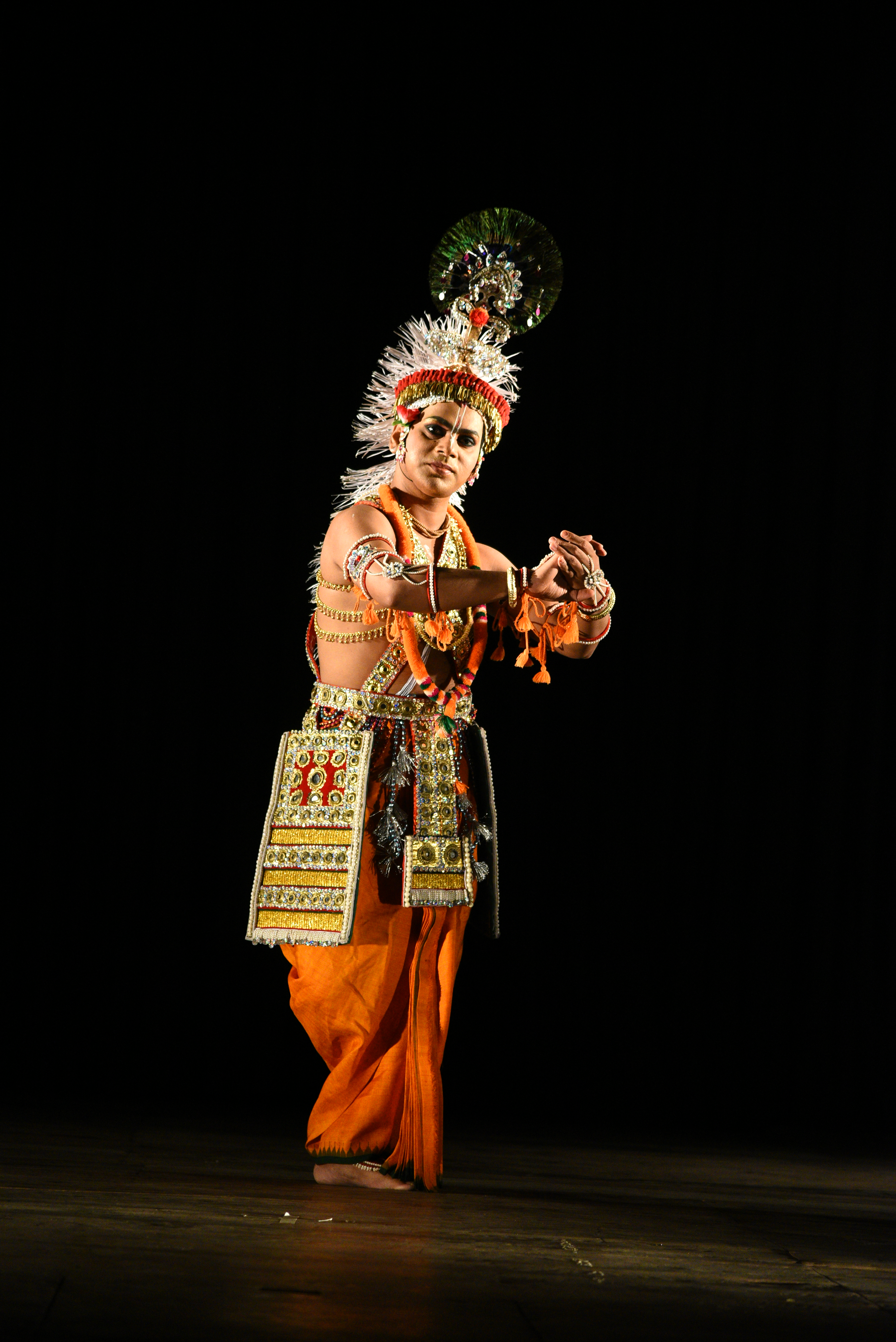
A male performer as Krishna

Men wear Leittreng (Kajenglei) (golden headdress around the head) and Chura (made of peacock feathers, wired on top of the head).

The male characters dress in a dhoti (also called dhotra or dhora) – a brilliantly colored broadcloth pleated, wrapped and tied at waist and allowing complete freedom of movement for the legs. Dancers wear a bright yellow-orange dhoti while playing Krishna and a green/blue dhoti while playing Balaram. A crown decorated with peacock feather adorns the dancer's head, who portrays Krishna.

The Pung Cholom dancers wear white dhoti that covers the lower part of body from waist and a snow-white turban on the head. A shawl neatly folded adorns their left shoulders while the drum strap falls on their right shoulders.

The costume tradition of the Manipuri dance celebrates its more ancient artistic local traditions, fused with the spiritual themes of prema bhava of Radha-Krishna found in the tenth book of the Bhagavata Purana.

The Huyen langlon dancers, however, typically wear costumes of Manipuri warriors. The costume varies depending on their gender.

== Music and instruments ==
The musical accompaniment for Manipuri dance comes from a percussion instrument called the Pung (a barrel drum), a singer, small kartals (cymbals), sembong, harmonium, and wind instrument such as a flute.

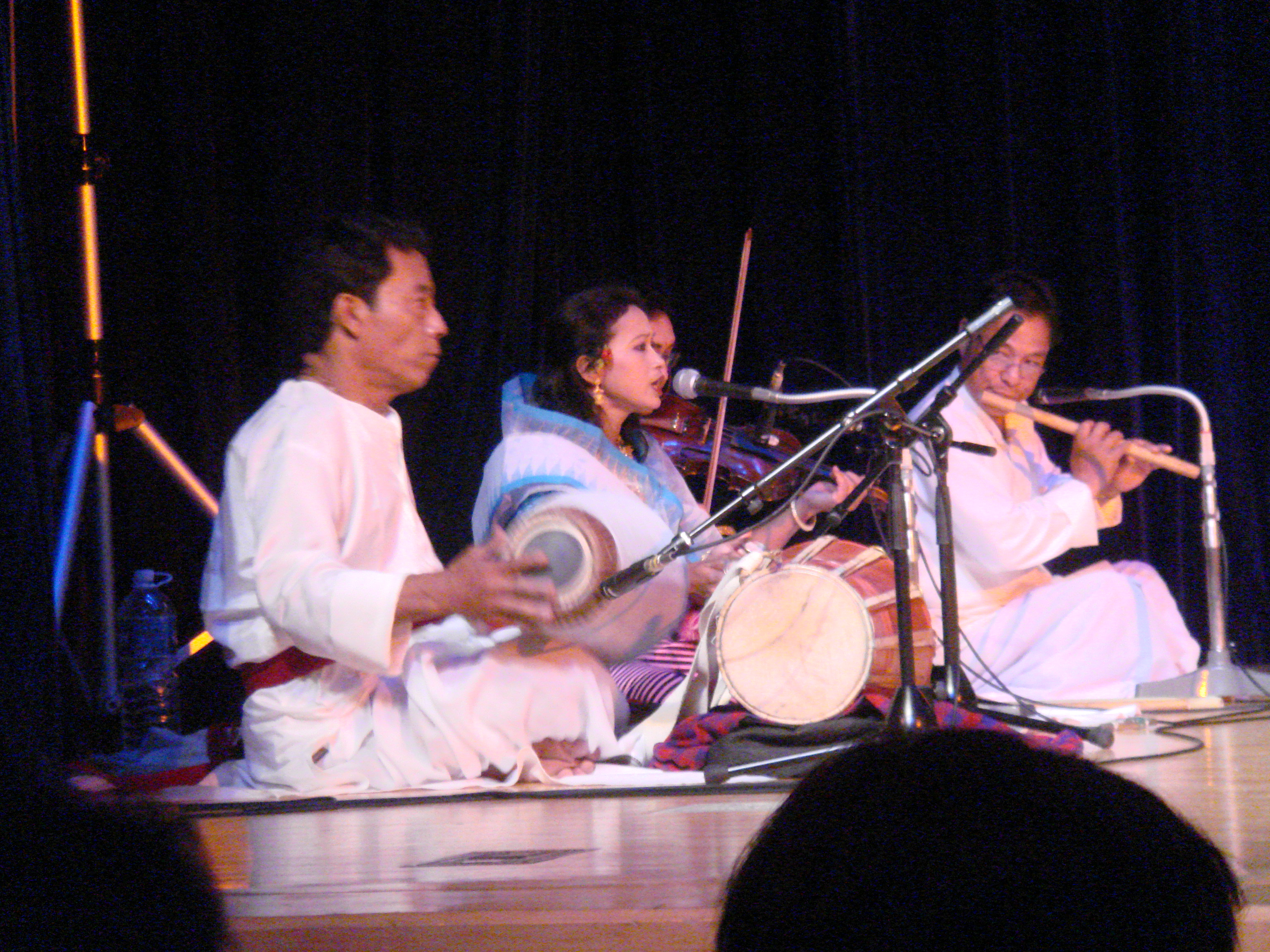
Musical instruments at Jagoi.

The drummers are male artistes and, after learning to play the pung, students train to dance with it while drumming. This dance is celebrated, states Massey, with the dancer wearing white turbans, white dhotis (for Hindu dummers) or kurtas (for Muslim dummers), a folded shawl over the left shoulder, and the drum strap worn over the right shoulder. It is known as Pung cholom, and the dancer plays the drum and performs the dance jumps and other movements.

Another dance called Kartal cholom, is similar to Pung cholom, but the dancers carry and dance to the rhythm created with cymbals. This is a group dance, where dancers form a circle, move in the same direction while making music and dancing to the rhythm. Women dance too as groups, such as in the Manipuri dance called Mandilla cholom, and these usually go with devotional songs and playing colorful tassels-string tied cymbals where one side represents Krishna and the other Radha. Shaiva (tandava) dances are choreographed as Duff cholom and Dhol cholom.

The songs in Huyen langlon can be played with any Meitei instruments such as the pena and are usually aggressive sounding but they contain no lyrics.

== Styles and categories ==
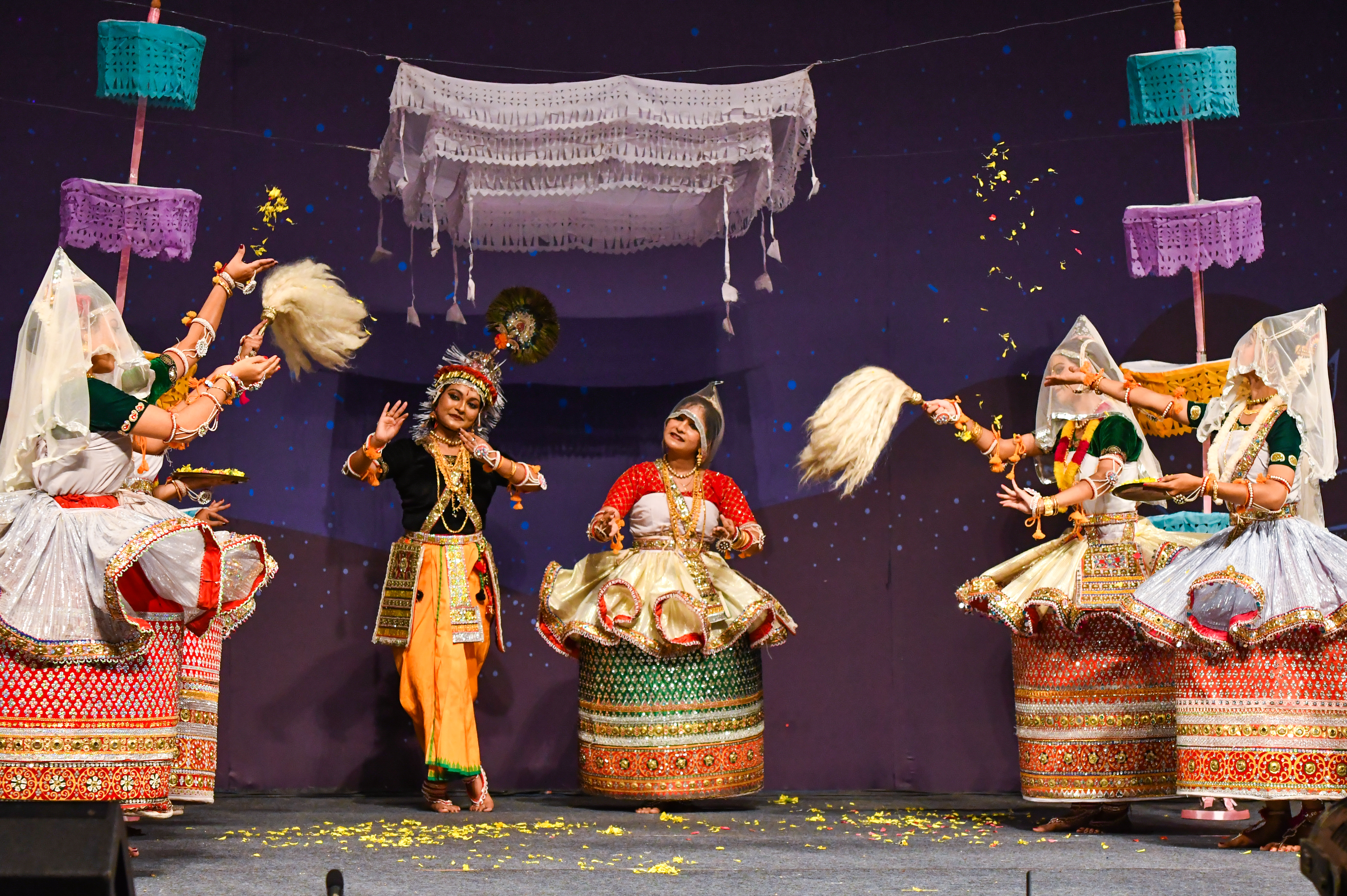
Manipuri dance

The traditional Manipuri Raas Lila is performed in three styles – Tal Rasak, Danda Rasak and Mandal Rasak. A Tal Rasak is accompanied with clapping, while Danda Rasak is performed by synchronous beat of two sticks but the dancers position it differently to create geometric patterns. The Gopis dance in a circle around the Krishna character in the center.

The Manipuri dance comes in two categories - tandav (vigorous dance for the dancer who plays Krishna) and lasya (delicate dance for the dancers who play Radha and Gopis).

The Manipuri Raas Leela dance style embodies dreamy wavelike movements where one movement dissolves into another like the waves of an ocean. The dance features rounded soft movements of women, and occasional fast movements by male characters. Unlike the other classical dance forms of India, the Manipuri dance artists do not wear anklet bells and the footwork is subdued and gentle in the Manipuri style. The stage movements is part of a composite movement of the whole body.

There are five types of accepted Ras Leela, they are Maharas, Basantaras, Kunjaras, Nityaras and Dibaras.

The Maharas Leela is the most prominent. This dance is performed in the month of Kartik (around November) on a full moon night. It is a story of the Gopis sorrow after the disappearance of Krishna. After seeing the Gopis disheartened, Krishna then reappears and multiplies himself so that he is dancing with each Gopi.

The Basantaras is celebrated on Chaitra (around April) on a full moon night welcoming the spring season. During this time Holi is also celebrated where participants throw colored water or powder at each other. The story of Basantaras is based on Jaidev's Gita Govinda and the Brahma Vavairta Purana.

Kunjaras is celebrated on Ashwin (October) in Autumn on a full moon night.

Nityaras is celebrated any night of the year except for the previous three raas (Maharas, Basantaras and Kunjaras). The story is of the divine union of Radha and Krishna after Radha surrenders herself to Krishna.

Dibaras is celebrated any time of the year during the day besides the periods of Maharas, Basantaras and Kunjaras. The performance comes from the chapters in the Shri Krishnaras- Sangeet Samgraha, Govinda Leelamritya, Shrimad Bhagavata and Sangitamahava.

== International recognition ==
=== In Armenia-India relations ===
Manipuri classical dance is illustrated in a postage stamp issued by Armenia in 2018, where it is referred to as the "National Dances" (of India and Armenia respectively), along with the Armenian Hov Arek, in the Armenia-India joint issue of postage stamps.

=== In international cultural events ===
The Manipuri classical dance is recognised as well as honoured in numerous international platforms, including but not limited to the International Classical Manipuri Dance Festival, the International Dance Day, the International Dance Festival-Silicon Valley, the Samarpan, an international classical Manipuri dance festival, the International Indian Classical Dance festival (INDICLAD), the International Folk-Lore Festival, the Opening Ceremony of Asian Games, Seoul, 1986 as well as the 5th International Theatre Festival, London, 1989.

== See also ==
- Art and culture of Manipur
- Rajkumar Singhajit Singh
- Darshana Jhaveri
- Manipuri Sankirtana
- Meitei classical language movement

== Bibliography ==
- Saryu Doshi (1989). Dances of Manipur: The Classical Tradition. Marg Publications. ISBN 978-81-85026-09-1.
- Manipuri by R K Singhajit Singh, Dances of India series, Wisdom Tree, ISBN 81-86685-15-4.
- Devi, Pukhrambam Lilabati (2014). Pedagogic Perspectives in Indian Classical Dance: The Manipuri and The Bharatanatyam. Ruby Press & Company. ISBN 978-9382395393.
- Ragini Devi (1990). Dance Dialects of India. Motilal Banarsidass. ISBN 978-81-208-0674-0.
- Natalia Lidova (2014). Natyashastra. Oxford University Press. doi:10.1093/obo/9780195399318-0071.
- Natalia Lidova (1994). Drama and Ritual of Early Hinduism. Motilal Banarsidass. ISBN 978-81-208-1234-5.
- Williams, Drid (2004). "In the Shadow of Hollywood Orientalism: Authentic East Indian Dancing" (PDF). Visual Anthropology. 17 (1). Routledge: 69–98. doi:10.1080/08949460490274013. S2CID 29065670. Archived from the original (PDF) on 4 March 2016.
- Tarla Mehta (1995). Sanskrit Play Production in Ancient India. Motilal Banarsidass. ISBN 978-81-208-1057-0.
- Reginald Massey (2004). India's Dances: Their History, Technique, and Repertoire. Abhinav Publications. ISBN 978-81-7017-434-9.
- Emmie Te Nijenhuis (1974). Indian Music: History and Structure. BRILL Academic. ISBN 90-04-03978-3.
- Kapila Vatsyayan (2001). Bharata, the Nāṭyaśāstra. Sahitya Akademi. ISBN 978-81-260-1220-6.
- Kapila Vatsyayan (1977). Classical Indian dance in literature and the arts. Sangeet Natak Akademi. OCLC 233639306., Table of Contents
- Kapila Vatsyayan (1974). Indian classical dance. Sangeet Natak Akademi. OCLC 2238067.
- Kapila Vatsyayan (2008). Aesthetic theories and forms in Indian tradition. Munshiram Manoharlal. ISBN 978-8187586357. OCLC 286469807.
- Kapila Vatsyayan. Dance In Indian Painting. Abhinav Publications. ISBN 978-81-7017-153-9.
- Wallace Dace (1963). "The Concept of "Rasa" in Sanskrit Dramatic Theory". Educational Theatre Journal. 15 (3): 249–254. doi:10.2307/3204783. JSTOR 3204783.
- Farley P. Richmond; Darius L. Swann; Phillip B. Zarrilli (1993). Indian Theatre: Traditions of Performance. Motilal Banarsidass. ISBN 978-81-208-0981-9.
