= Darshana Jhaveri =

Indian dancer (born 1940)

- Born: 1940 (age 85–86); Mumbai, India
- Occupations: Dancer, choreographer, teacher
- Years active: 1958 -
- Dancing career
- Dances: Manipuri dance

Darshana Jhaveri (born 1940), the youngest of the four Jhaveri sisters, is an Indian exponent of Manipuri dance, an Indian classical dance form. She is a disciple of Guru Bipin Singh, and started performing on stage in 1958 along with her sisters. She is one of the founders of the Manipuri Nartanalaya in 1972, which popularized Manipuri dance in India, and is currently headed by her, with centres at Mumbai, Kolkata and Imphal.

== Early life and training ==
Darshana Jhaveri was born and brought up in Mumbai in a Gujarati household. At the age of six, she saw her elder sisters, Nayana and Ranjana, learn Manipuri dance from Guru Bipin Singh at their home. Soon, she too started learning the dance form, along with her sister Suverna. Later, she learned the traditional Raslila dances from Sutradhari Kshetritombi Devi, the Nata Pung from Guru Meitei Tomba Singh and traditional Maibi Jagoi from Kumar Maibi.

== Career ==
By the 1950s, the Jhaveri sisters – Nayana, Ranjana, Suverna, and Darshana – had started performing together on stage all over India and abroad, and, in 1956, were the first non-Manipuris to perform their dances at the Govindji Temple inside the royal palace of Imphal. Eventually, the sisters established the Manipuri Nartanalaya with their Guru and Kalavati Devi in 1972, at Mumbai, Kolkata, and Imphal, and in time their name became synonymous to Manipuri dance. Over the years, Darshana has published several books and articles on the dance and has assisted her guru during his lifetime, in teaching, research as well as in choreography, before taking on the mantle herself.

According to a noted dance critic Sunil Kothari in a 2008 article, they are "responsible for bringing the temple tradition of Manipuri dance to the cities". The article also noted that Nayana died two decades ago and, with Suverna unwell, Ranjana and Darshana continue to perform along with her Dance troupe and teach Manipuri dance.

== Awards and honors ==
Darshana Jhaveri received the Sangeet Natak Akademi Award in 1996 by Sangeet Natak Akademi, India's National Academy of Dance, Music and Drama. She was honored with the Padma Shri in 2002. She was awarded the Kalidas Samman Award in 2018.
