= Ritual dance of the royal drum =

Intangible cultural heritage of Burundi

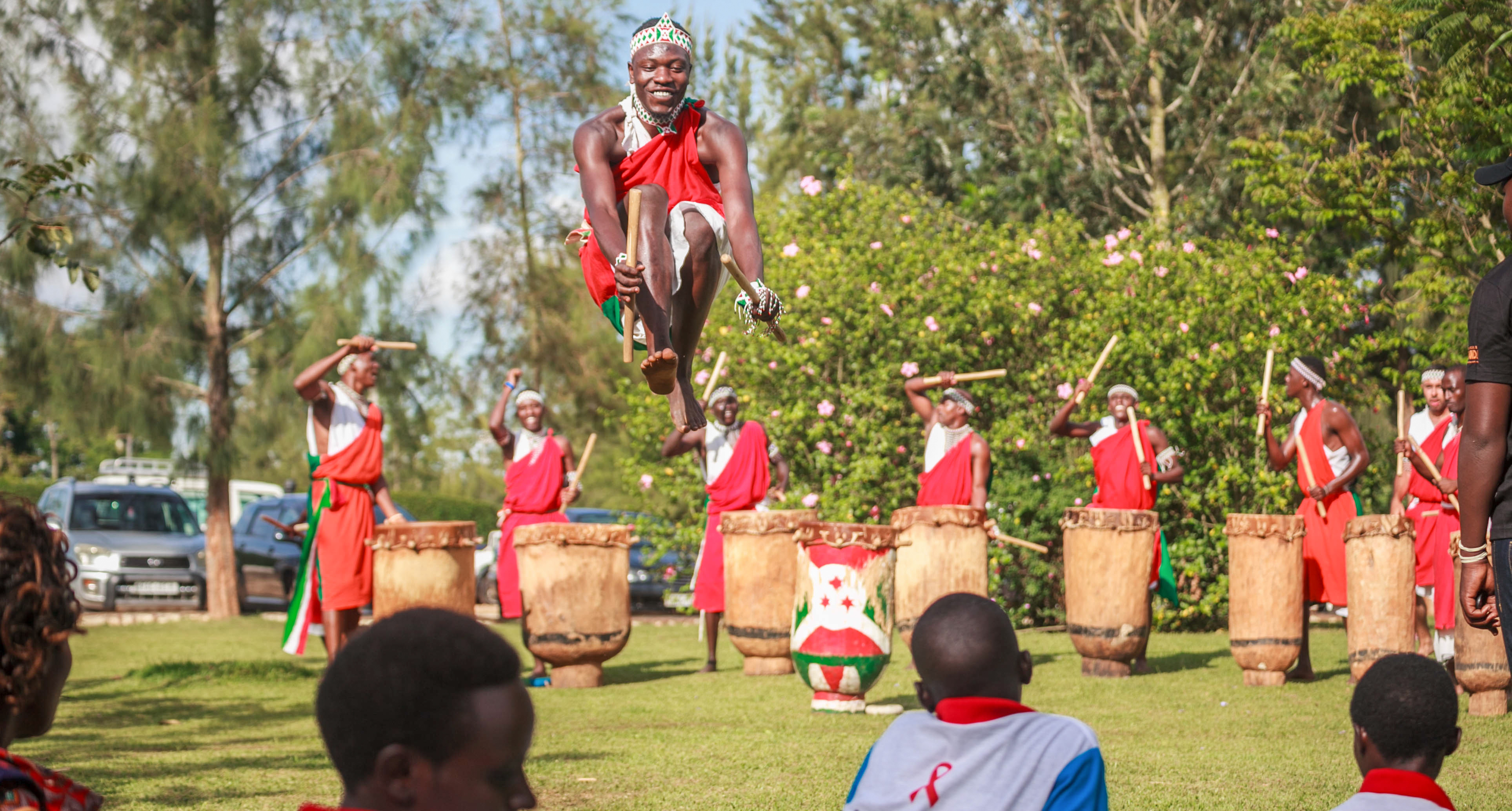
- Burundian drum crew performing in Kigali, Rwanda
- Medium: Drumming, dancing and traditional songs
- Originating culture: Culture of Burundi

Ritual dance of the royal drum
- UNESCO Intangible Cultural Heritage
- Country: Burundi
- Reference: 00989
- Region: Africa

Inscription history
- Inscription: 2014 (9th session)
- List: Representative

The Ritual dance of the royal drum is a drumming tradition from Burundi that combines synchronised drumming with dancing and traditional songs. In 2014, it was added to the Representative List of the Intangible Cultural Heritage of Humanity by UNESCO.

The dance usually has about a dozen drums, in a semicircle around a central drum. A few of the drummers also dance to the rhythm. In ancient Burundi, drums were sacred objects, reserved only for people performing rituals. The major events of the country were marked by their beating, like coronations and royal funerals.

In 2017, a Presidential decree said that only male performers were to be allowed to play the drums in the future.

== Gallery ==
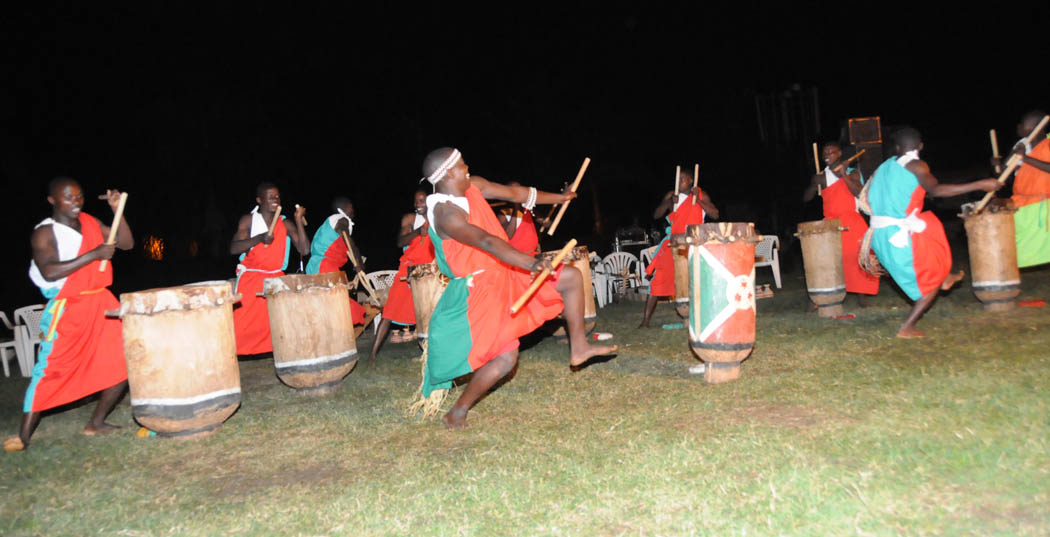
Drummers around a central drum

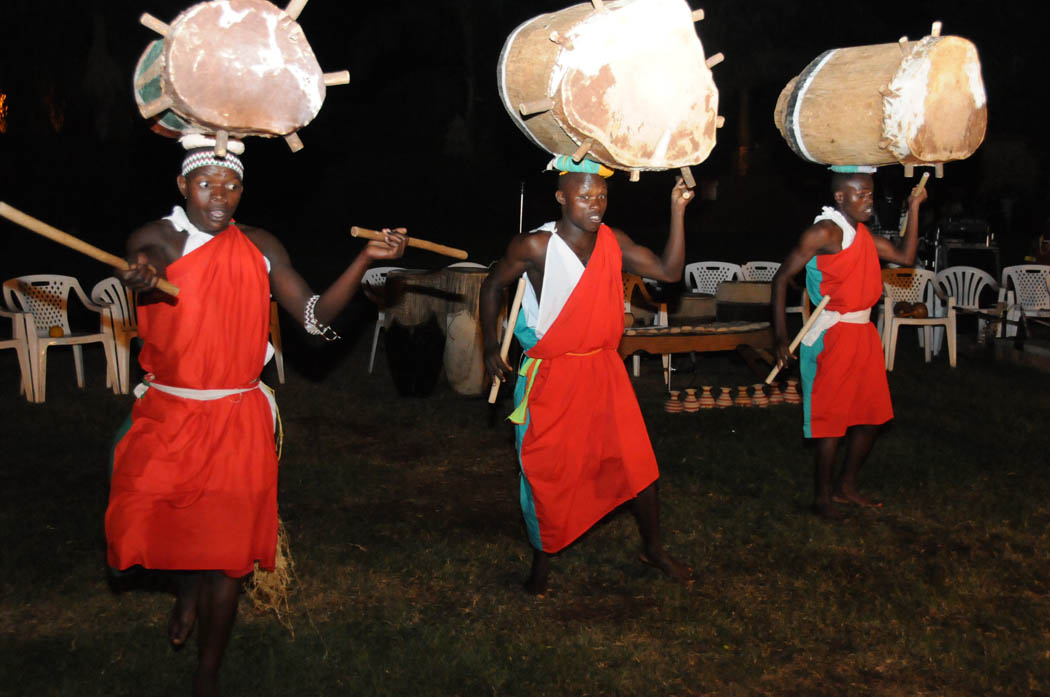
Drummers with drums on their head

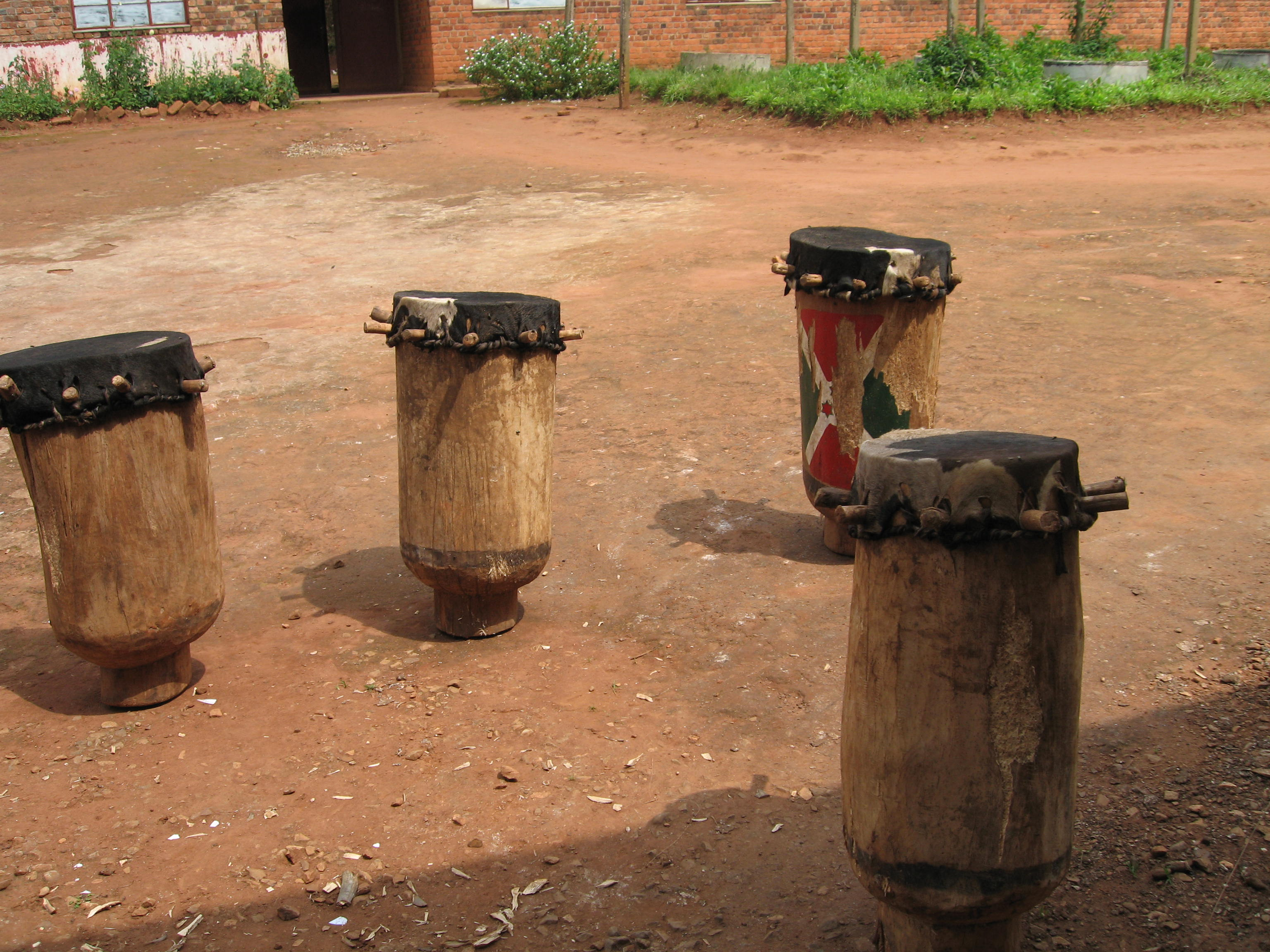
Gitega drums

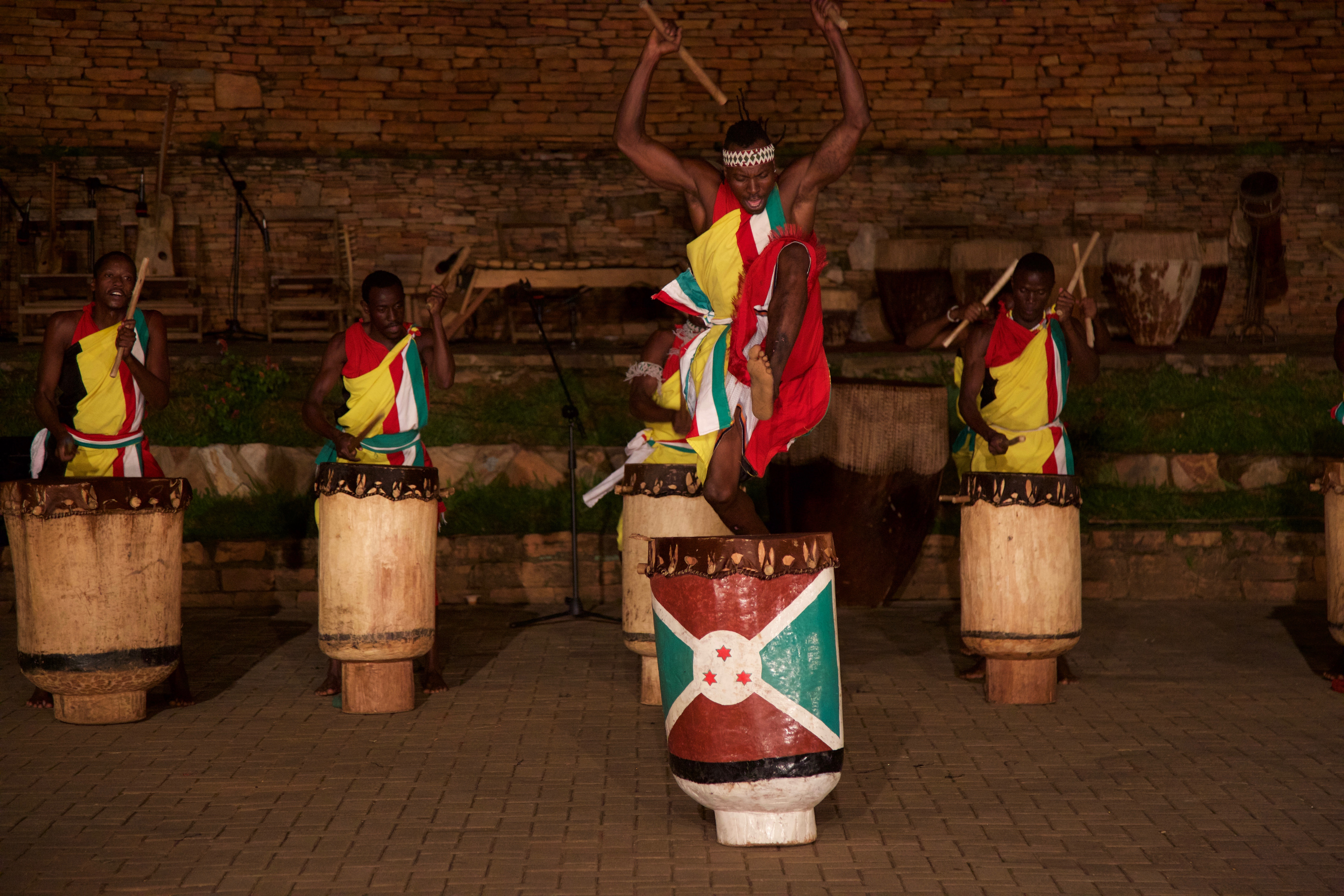
Drummers performing in Kampala

== See also ==
- Royal Drummers of Burundi
