= Jangi (dance) =

Dance of Azerbaijan

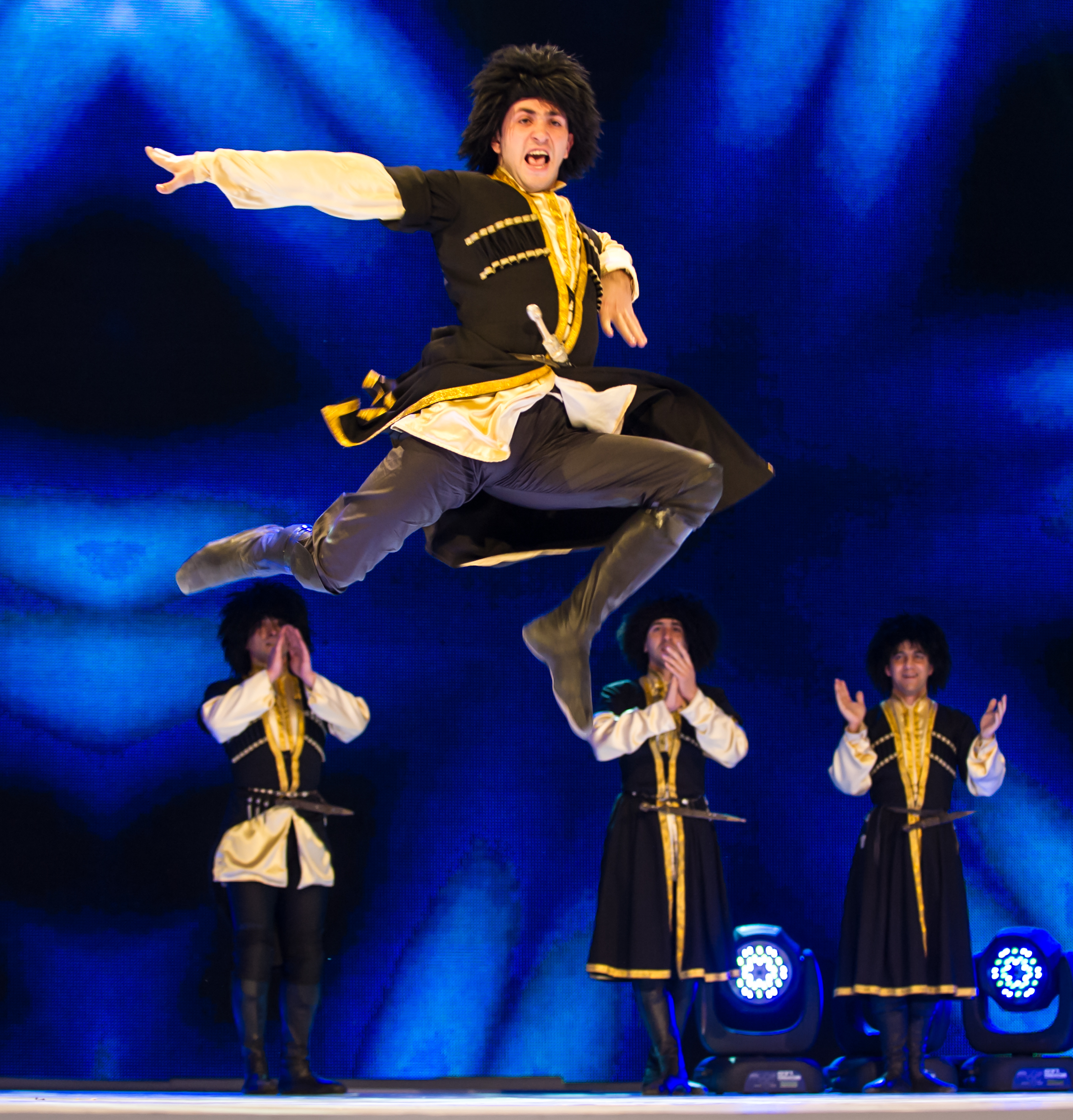
Jangi (dance)

Jangi (Azerbaijani: Cəngi) is a national dance of Azerbaijan. The dance is classified as a heroic military dance.

== Origins ==
In translation from Azerbaijani language, with the word being derived through Persian, Jangi means “fighting”.

The dance is very ancient. It's a reminder of the Azerbaijani struggle of strong men and was performed in honor of them. The dance expresses a challenge to a battle. This dance of the South Caucasus region is a "war dance".

== Performance ==
The dance is performed only for men, in holidays or concerts. It is based on the shur music, and is in the 2/4 time signature. Traditional Azerbaijani costumes are used by the dancing men, which includes a colorful long jacket, a trouser, and pair of boots.
