= Armenian dance =

Armenian folk dancing

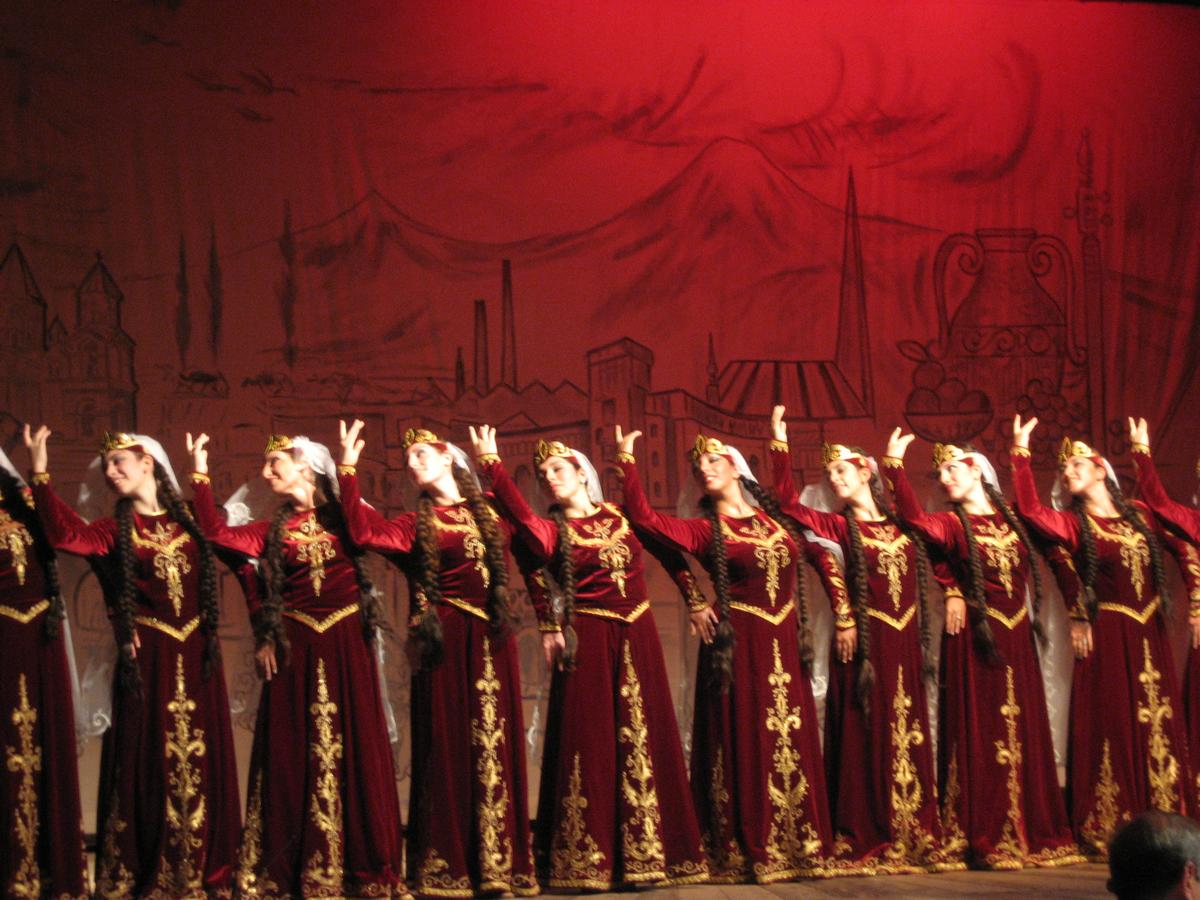
Traditional Armenian Dance

The Armenian dance (Armenian: Հայկական պար) heritage has been considered the oldest and most varied in its respective region. From the fifth to the third millennia B.C., in the higher regions of Armenia, the land of Ararat, there are rock paintings of scenes of country dancing. These dances were most likely accompanied by certain kinds of songs or musical instruments. In the fifth century, Moses of Khoren (Movsés Khorenats'i) himself had heard of how the old descendants of Aram (that is Armenians) make mention of these things (epic tales) in the ballads for the lyre and their songs and dances.

Traditional dancing is popular among expatriate Armenians, and has been exported to international folk dance groups and circle dance groups. Dancers wear traditional costumes to embody the history of their culture and to tell their ancestors' stories. The design of these costumes is influenced by factors such as religious traditions, family methods, and practicality. The coloring and beading of the costumes tie the dance and the tradition together. The movements of the Armenian cultural dance are performed for audiences around the world .

== Religious dancing ==
The origin of religious dancing is ancient, an expression of the inner feelings of those who participated in such performances. It is of interest to note that dance never occurred alone but was always accompanied by song, clapping of hands, and musical instruments. As with music, so too the dance expressed a person's internal spiritual emotions and personal disposition. Religious festivals and pilgrimages played an important role in Armenian dance traditions. As early as the twelfth century, villagers travelled to major religious festivals to participate in spiritual activities and share dances. They later brought these dances back to their villages, adapting them to local traditions and including them in their communities' dance repertories. The development of Armenian dance traditions was also influenced by the spread of Christianity. Older symbolic and ritual elements were reinterpreted under Christian influence. The Echmiadzin dance, associated with the Karin region, provides an example of this relationship between older beliefs and Christianity.

== Soviet Union ==
During the 1920s and 1930s, three Armenian dance teachers moved to Iran from the Soviet Union and opened dance schools. Their names were Madame Yelena, Madame Coronelli, and Sarkis Djanbazian. They taught ballet and character dance. Most of their students were members of the Armenian community in Tehran, but their classes were also attended by students from diverse backgrounds, including Muslims, Jews, Baha'is, and Zoroastrians. Sarkis Djanbazian initially settled in Qazvin in 1938, where he began teaching dance. After facing difficulties obtaining permission to establish a dance school, he was allowed by the local Armenian priest to hold classes on the rooftop of the Armenian Church. He later moved to Tehran in 1942, where he initially taught dance at the Armenian Kušeš High School before establishing the Tehran Ballet School in the same year. His teaching contributed to the development of formal ballet education in Iran, and the school eventually enrolled 150 students by 1955.

== National dance ==
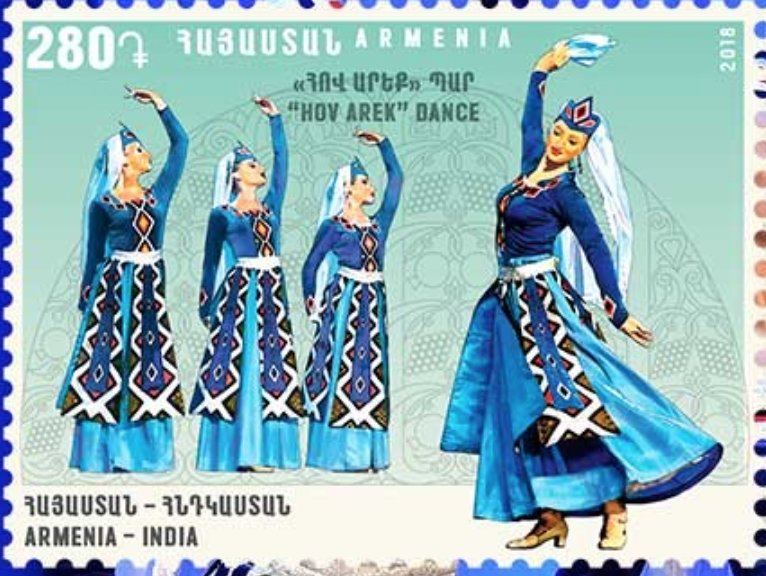
Hov Arek Armenian Dance

In 2018, Armenia and India issued a joint set of two postage stamps on the theme of "National Dances". The Armenian stamp depicted "Hov Arek", and the Indian stamp depicted Manipuri classical dance. The Armenian Minister of Transport, Communications and Information Technologies approved the designs through Ministerial order No. 388-N of 1 June 2018. The stumps were issued on 29 August 2018.

== Folk dances ==
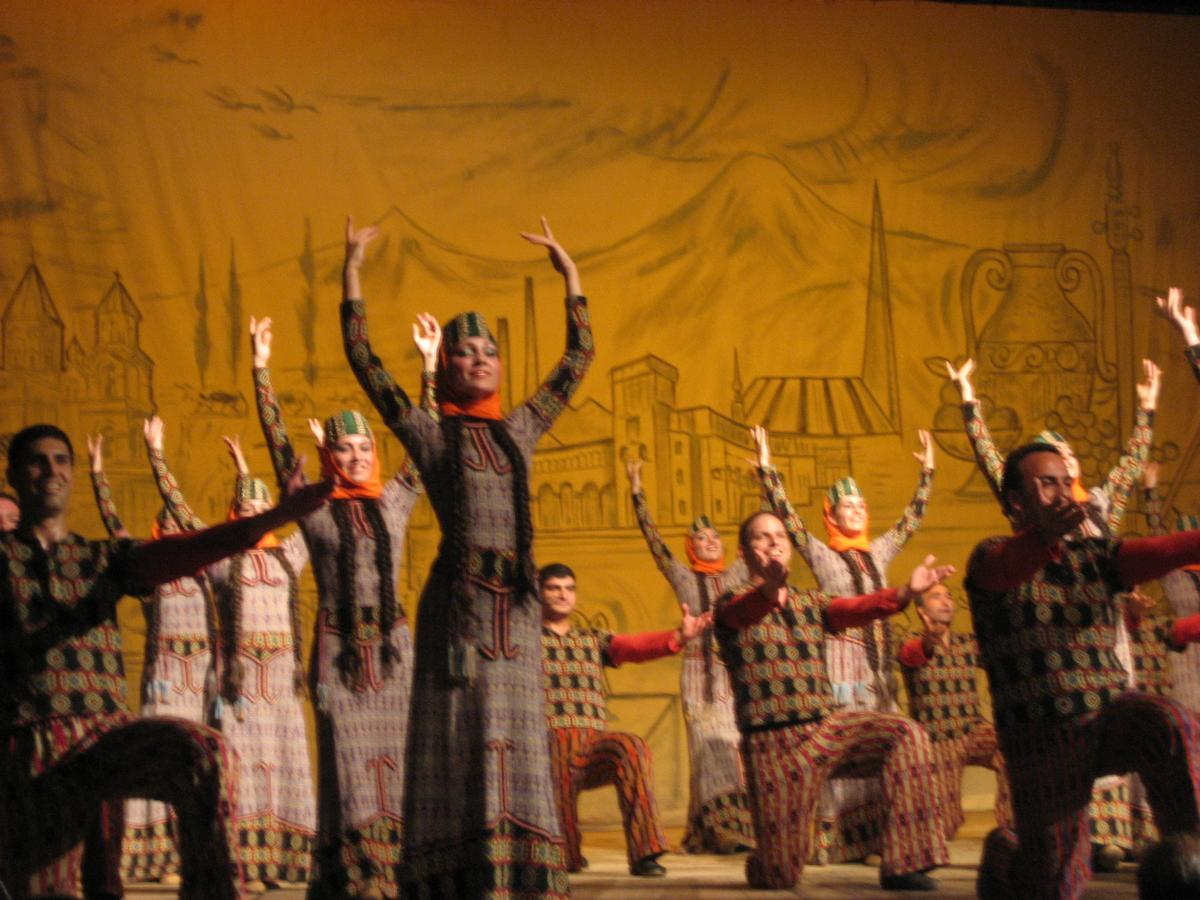
Traditional Armenian Dance

The terminology used to describe Armenian folk performance varies across historical and cultural contexts. The Armenian terms ''azgagrakan'' (ethnographic), ''avandakan'' (traditional), ''azgayin'' (national) and ''ǰoghovrdakan'' (of the people) have overlapping but distinct meanings in discussions of folk culture.

The presentation of Armenian folk dance on stage dates to the late 19th century, when dance folklore was arranged for performance in urban centres such as Tiflis, Baku, Constantinople and Izmir. These presentations developed alongside the continued practice of traditional folk dance. In Armenia itself, staged folk dance expanded during the 1930s, particularly through amateur dance groups and dance education.

Choreographers adapted traditional dances to theatrical and concert settings. Naira Kilichyan describes the work of choreographer Vahram Aristakesyan, whose arrangements included reducing the number of performers, shortening dance durations and modifying the relationship between dance steps and musical phrases. He also introduced transitions between slower and faster sections and created dance suites combining different dances and rhythms, including female, male and mixed dances. The staging process did not produce uniform results. Kilichyan notes that dance groups performed both original folklore and staged versions. Folk culture festivals and amateur groups also contributed to the preservation of traditional dance patterns and the transmission of dances between generations.

- Kochari (Քոչարի) - Kochari is one of the most popular dances of Armenians. Kochari is danced in a group of men and women and is known for its tune played on the zurna.
- Shalakho (Շալախօ) - A dance for men from Ancient Armenia. It is performed in dance studios by men, but danced at public gatherings by women as well.
- Tamzara (Թամզարա) - A dance originating in the Armenian Highlands.
- Yarkhushta (Յարխուշտա) - Yarkhushta is a martial dance from the Taron and Aghdznik regions of Western Armenia.
- Berd (Բերդապար) - Berd is a dance famous for having a circle of men stand on the shoulders of another circle and rotate. Berd means "fortress" in Armenian and is named accordingly because of the shape the dancers make.
- Shirkhani (Շիրխանի)
- Harsnapar (Հարսնապար) - from the Armenian hars which means bride, and par which translates to dance. The bride is shown dancing a solo and may possibly feature the bridesmaids.
- Gorani (Գորանի)
- Gyond (Գյոնդ or Գյովնդ)
- Menapar (Մենապար) - Menapar translates to "solo." It may feature a man or woman. Normally, if a man is the one dancing, the music will be fast-paced and in the case of a woman, a slower, more elegant music will play.
- Nazpar (Նազպար)
- Shurjpar (Շուրջպար)
- Souserapar (Սուսերապար)
- Papuri (Փափուռի)
- Zuykpar (Զույգապար) - Zuykpar is a duet done by a man and woman. It features a liveliness to it and normally includes both dancers doing symmetrical movements.
- Uzundara
- Ververi (Վերվերի)
- Msho Khr (Մշոյ խըռ) - originated in the region of Մուշ (Moush).
- Lorke (Լորկէ)
- Tsakhkadzori (Ծաղկաձորի)
- Karno kochari (Կարնոյ քոչարի) - Very similar to Kochari, originated in region of Կարին (Karin).
- Ishkhanats par (Իշխանաց պար) - Also known as the "Lords' dance".
- Fndzhan (Ֆնջան)
- Kertsi (Քերծի)
- Kajats khagh (Քաջաց խաղ)
- Tamour agha (Թամուր աղա)
- Trtghouk (Թրթռուկ)
- Srabar (Սրաբար)
- Asdvadzatsna (Աստուածածնայ պար)
- Tars par (Թարս պար)

== Traditional Dances ==
=== Dance Forms and Symbolism ===
Ethnographer Srbuhi Lisitsian, in her study of Armenian traditional dances, documented their movements, musical and verbal elements, costumes and performance arrangements. She also examined their origins, the occasions on which they were performed and their connections with traditional rituals. Her analysis included dance rhythms, foot movements and the use of Armenian musical instruments.

Lisitsian classified dances according to recurring movement patterns, including steps forward and backward and movements to the right or left. She also explored their symbolic meanings and the role of the dance leader. In her interpretation, movements to the right symbolised success, while those to the left symbolised failure. Snake-like movements were associated with the dual symbolism of serpents in Armenian beliefs. Circular formations, found in many traditional dances, were linked to protection against evil spirits and enemies, as well as to the sun, moon and their cycles.

Beyond movement and symbolism, Lisitsian connected Armenian dances with folklore, mythology, historical accounts, customs and religious beliefs. She also documented traditional conceptions of benevolent and evil spirits and the role of magical dances in Armenian cultural practices.

=== Field Research and Documentation ===
Lisitsian collected dances directly from practitioners during field research in different regions of Armenia. Her first volume of ''Ancient Dances and Theatrical Performances of the Armenian People'', published in 1958, was based on the collection and recording of 650 Armenian dances, 50 Kurdish dances and several others. Over the course of her life, she recorded nearly 2,000 dances. The study also included illustrations and photographs of Armenian traditional costumes (''taraz''), musical instruments, ethnic communities and architectural settings in which dances were performed. Its appendices contained verbal texts of dances, accompanied by Armenian translations where the original texts were in other languages.

To document movements accurately, Lisitsian developed a graphic movement notation system, published in her 1940 book ''Movement Notation (Kinetography)''. The system was conceived not only as a way of recording dance but as a universal method of documenting human movement in everyday life, work and art. It used 32 symbols and grid paper to record body positions and movements, facial expressions, muscular tension and movement rhythm. Its notation also incorporated musical melodies, accompanying words and the organization and rearrangement of performers in a performance space. The appendix of the book included examples of Armenian dance movements, including those from ''Ver-Veri''.

The third volume of ''Ancient Dances and Theatrical Performances of the Armenian People'', published posthumously in 1983 and compiled by Lisitsian's student Emma Khachatryan, contained five chapters devoted to tightrope performances, mourning dances, military dances, travel dances and children's dances.

===== The revival =====
The revival of traditional dance has also taken place through public festivals, educational programmes and ethnographic ensembles. Musicologist Hripsime Pikichian traces the renewed circulation of Armenian traditional music and dance to several initiatives, including ethnographic song and dance festivals organized by Yerevan Polytechnic Institute in the 1960s. In the post-Soviet period, traditional dance instruction evenings at Yerevan's Cascade, the Gutan Armenian song and dance festival, and national song and dance courses introduced into school curricula helped spread reinterpreted forms of traditional songs, dances, costumes and rituals in urban and rural communities and the Armenian diaspora. </nowiki></ref>

A public initiative involving the Karin ensemble was reintroduced at the Cafesjian Center for the Arts on 25 May 2012. During the events, dancers joined the public in forming dance circles and taught participants traditional dance movements. The Center reported that hundreds of people joined the monthly gatherings held between May and September.

Ethnographic ensembles have adopted different approaches to preserving and transmitting dance traditions. In her 2026 study, ethnographer Hayarpi Ananyan distinguishes between groups that concentrate on stage performances and internal training and those that involve wider public participation. She identifies the Akunk ethnographic ensemble as an example of a group that teaches dances primarily to its own members, while Karin combines performances with public instruction and explanations of dance histories and meanings. The Van ethnographic group stages reconstructions of traditional celebrations and rituals, whereas the Masunk traditional song and dance ensemble emphasizes participatory performances in which the distinction between performers and audience is reduced.

== Regional dances ==
- Arabkir (Արաբկիրի Պար) - A dance from the Armenian city of Arabkir.
- Kesabian (Քեսապական) - The Kesabian dance came from the city of Kesab, Syria.
- Laz bar - originated among the fishermen of the Black Sea.
- Moosh (or Muş, or Mus, Մշո Պար) - a mixed dance from the district of Moush/Taron, west of Lake Van.
- Sasnapar (Սասնապար) - a popular dance common at weddings and other cultural gatherings. It originated in the city of Sasun.
- Vagharshapatian (Վաղարշապատյան)- originated in Vagharshapat now known as Ejmiatsin.
- Zeytouni (Զեյթունի պար) - originated in Zeytun.
- Varaka Lerneri Bar.
- Zangezuri (Զանգեզուրի) - a female solo dance.
- Łarabałi (Ղարաբաղի) - 1) a female solo dance; 2) mournful memorial dance from Nagorno-Karabakh.

== See also ==
- Armenian Dance Sport Federation
- Armenian jewelry
- Armenian music
- Assyrian folk dance
- Iranian dance
- Vanoush Khanamirian
