= Yarkhushta =

Folk dance of the Armenian highlands

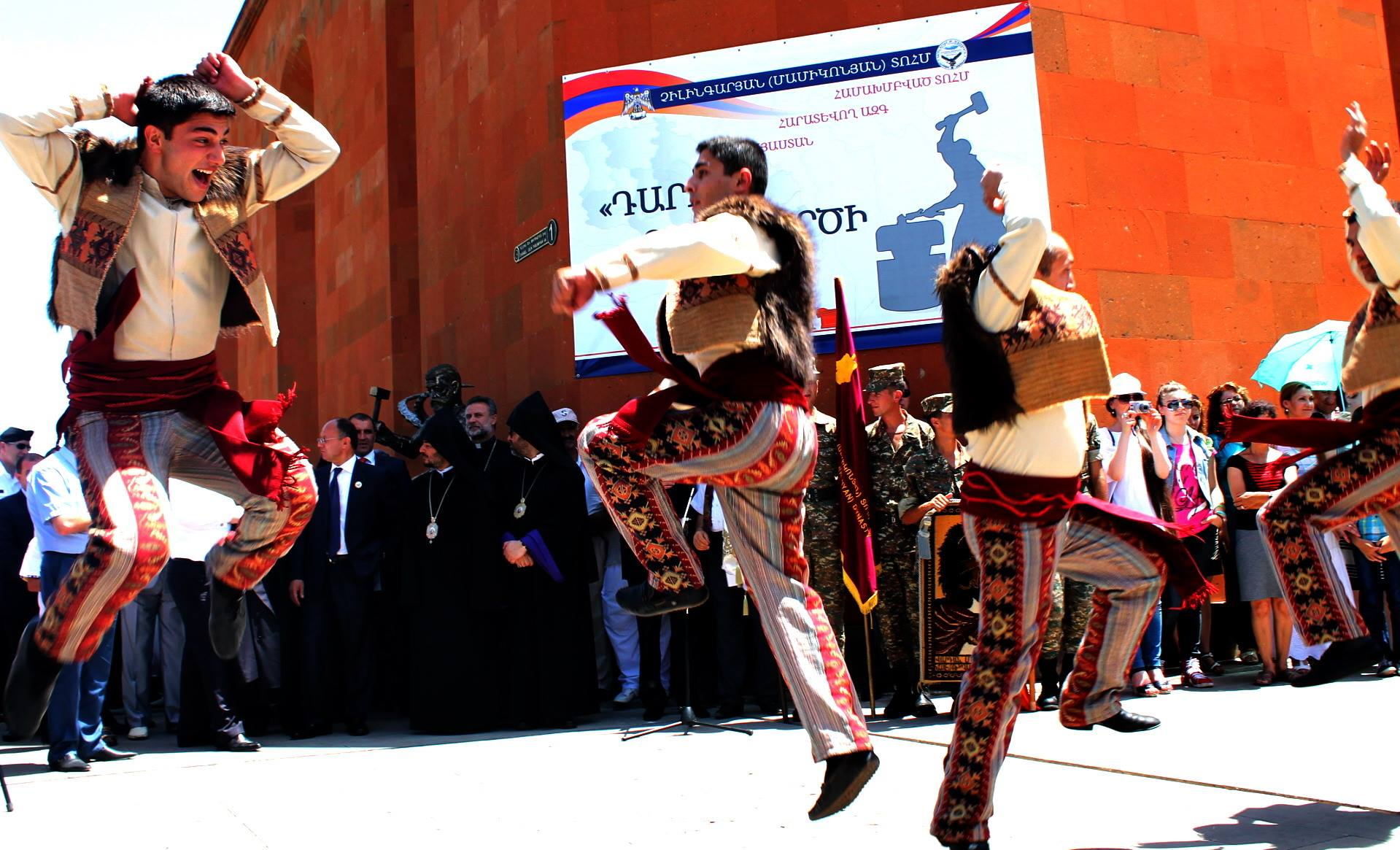
Yarkhushta performed by Karin folk dance troupe from Yerevan.

Yarkhushta (Armenian: Յարխուշտա (modern orthography) or Եարխուշտայ (classical/traditional orthography), pronounced [jɑɾχuʃtɑ]) is an Armenian folk and martial dance associated with the highlands of the historical region of Sasun in Western Armenia. Yarkhushta belongs to a wider category of Armenian "clap dances" (ծափ-պարեր, tsap parer). The dance is performed by men, who face each other in pairs. The key element of the dance is a forward movement where participants rapidly approach one another and vigorously clap onto the palms of hands of dancers in the opposite row.

== History and tradition ==
Yarkhushta is believed to have its origins in the early Middle Ages, as it is mentioned in the works of Movses Khorenatsi, Faustus of Byzantium, and Grigor Magistros.

Yarkhsuhta is a combination of a game and a dance. Originally, it was a martial training game that gradually developed into a dance. Its traditional performance involved competition, mock combat, and interactions between opposing sides. Yarkhushta has traditionally been danced by Armenian soldiers before combat engagements, partly for ritualistic purposes, and partly in order to cast away fear and boost battle spirit for more effective hand-to-hand combat. The dance was not performed only before battles. It was also performed during pilgrimages, weddings, and church celebrations. Two types of clapping were used: one-handed clapping, in which one side represents the attacker and the other hand the defender, and two-handed clapping, in which both sides attack and defend simultaneously.

== Euphorigenic effect ==
The tune of the dance is played intentionally very loudly by two zurna or pku (Armenian: պկու) hornpipes and one or more double-headed bass drums, each struck with a mallet and a stick from opposite sides of the drum's cylinder.

The dance also involves collective physical coordination, as participants respond to one another's movements and maintain a shared rhythm. The interaction between dancers contributes to the energetic and communal character of the performance.

It has been demonstrated that the combination of the hornpipes' high-frequency tone and the bass drums' deep, low-frequency beat creates sounds with wide peak-to-peak amplitude that are capable of placing the dancers in a state of euphoric trance. This factor amplifies the effect of an adrenaline rush that the dancing of yarkhushta usually produces.

== Modern revival ==
In modern-day Armenia, yarkhushta remains popular in settlements populated by refugees from Sassoun after the Armenian genocide, especially in the villages around the towns of Talin, Aparan, and Ashtarak, along with the slopes of Mount Aragats, where survivors preserved the dance as a living cultural heritage of their community. [1]

During the Soviet period, the dance was formally documented and adapted to the stage. Ethnographer Srbuhi Lisitsian recorded yarkhushta in ethnographic notation during the 1932 field expedition among Sasuntsi villagers in Ashnak, and later popularized it through formal dance instruction at the Yerevan Dance College in the late 1930s.In 1957, the dance underwent further choreographic refinement by choreographer and folklorist Vahram Aristakesian and was performed by a folk dance troupe from the village of Ashnak.

While yarkhushta was mainly performed as a choreographed concert dance in the Soviet era, [3] it was revived as a participatory folk tradition in the 1980s by the enthnographic group Maratuk and, later, by the Karin Traditional song and Dance Group as part of the broader azgagrakan cultural revival moment. [4] In 2017, Karin founder and artistic director Gagik Ginosyan launched a project to introduce traditional Armenian martial dances, including yarkhushta, into the training curriculum of the Armed forces of Armenia. [5]

In Armenian literature and documentary film, the dance inspired the 1975 poem “Dance of Sassoun” by Gevorg Emin. It is also the subject of the 2004 documentary film yarkhushta, directed by Gagik Ginosyan. [7]

== Gallery ==
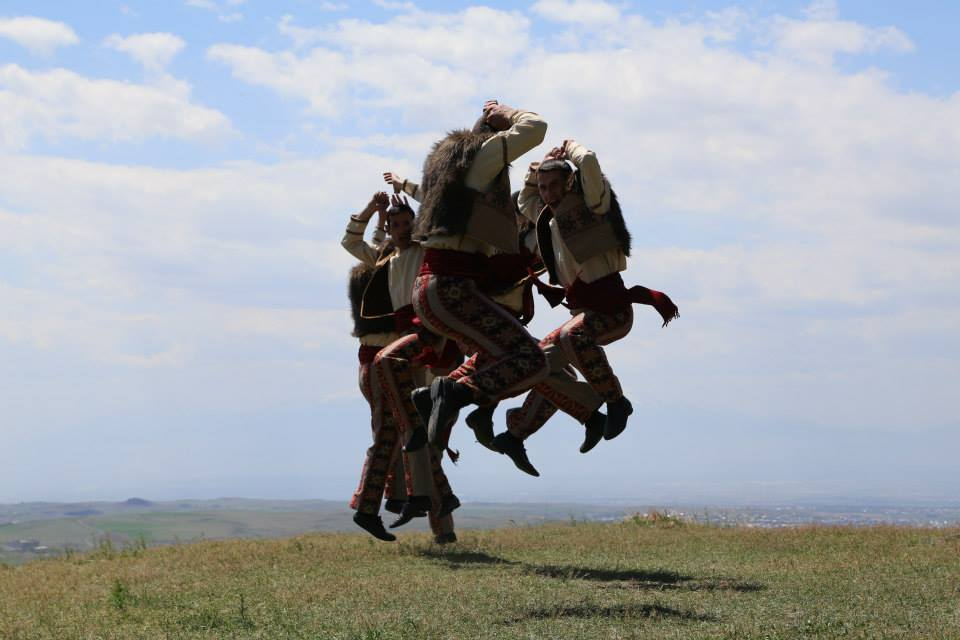
Men performing yarkhushta, 2015

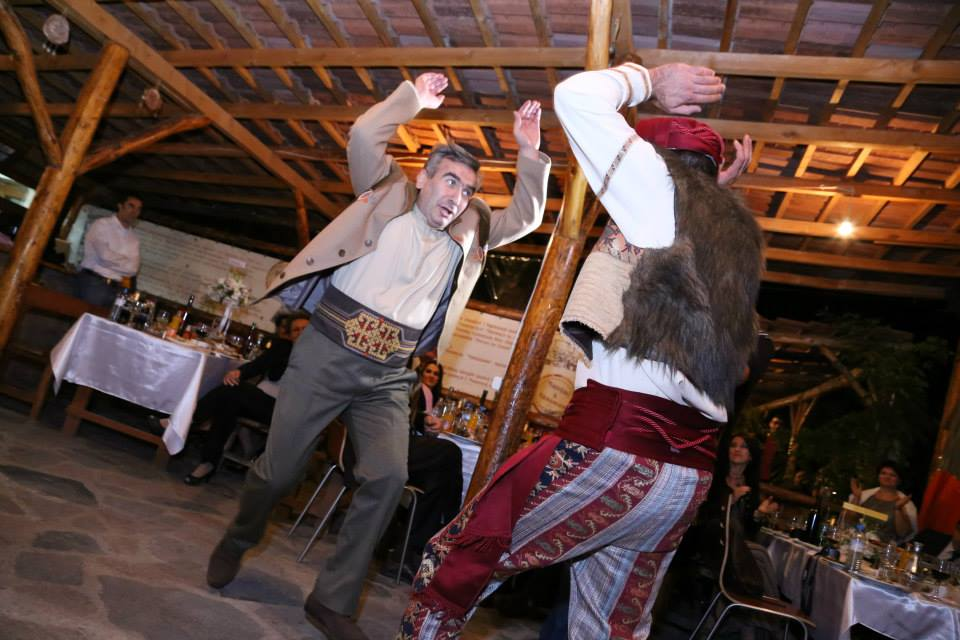
Yarkhushta dancers in a restaurant, 2015

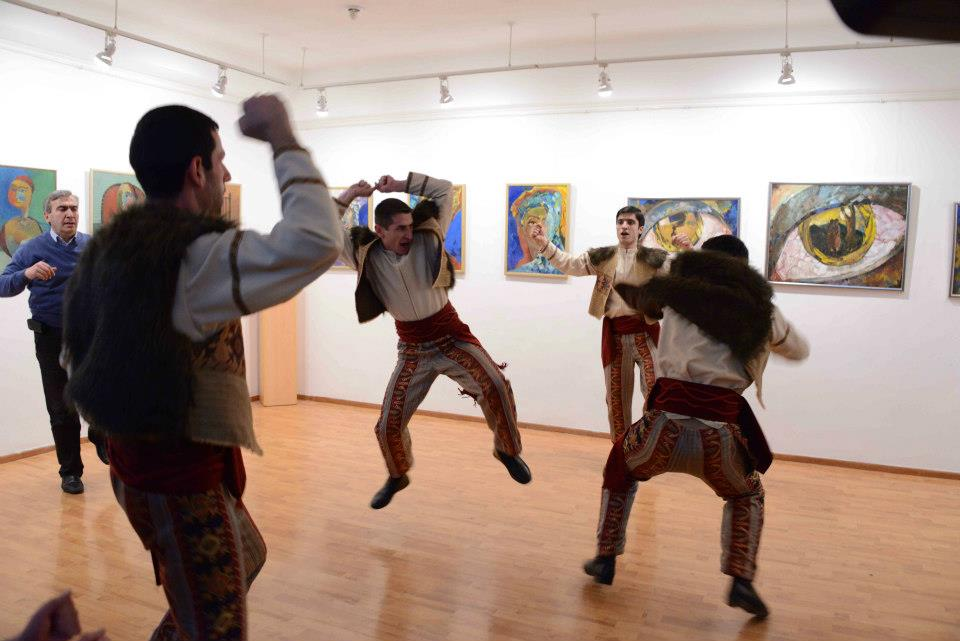
Dancers in an art gallery, 2015

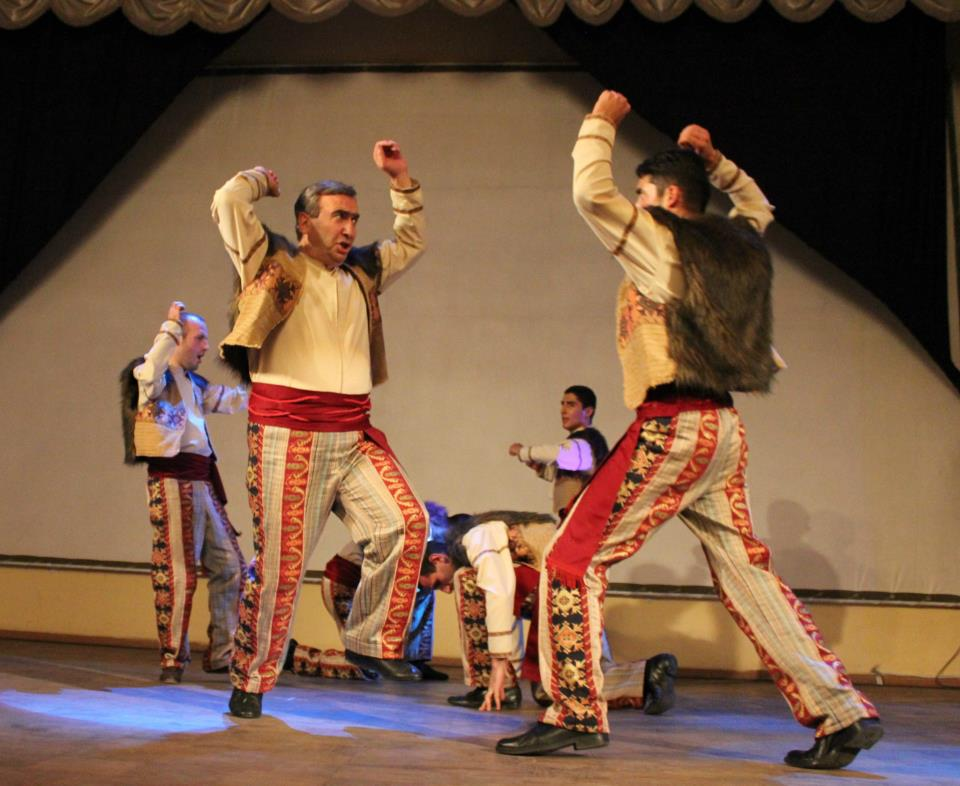
Dancers performing yarkhushta, 2015

== Video links ==
- Yarkhushta danced by Maratuk folk group
- Yarkhushta danced by Karin folk group
- The Yarkhushta tune (instrumental)

== See also ==
- Armenian dance
- Armenian music
