= Bharati Shivaji =

Classical dancer of Mohiniyattom, choreographer and author (Born: 1948)

- Born: 1948 (age 77–78); Kumbakonam, Tanjavur district, Tamil Nadu, India
- Occupation: Classical dancer
- Known for: Mohiniyattom
- Awards: Padma Shri; Sangeet Natak Akademi Award; Lasya Lakshmi; Sahitya Kala Parishad Samman; Nritya Choodamani

Bharati Shivaji is an Indian classical dancer of Mohiniyattom, choreographer and author, known for her contributions to the art form by way of performance, research and propagation. She is the founder of Center for Mohiniyattam, a dance academy promoting Mohiniyattom and the co-author of two books, Art of Mohiniyattom and Mohiniyattom. She is a recipient of the Sangeet Natak Akademi Award and Sahitya Kala Parishad Samman. The Government of India awarded her the fourth highest civilian honour of the Padma Shri, in 2004, for her contributions to Indian classical dance.

== Biography ==
Mohiniyattam is one of the eight Indian classical dance forms recognized by the Sangeet Natak Akademi. The term Mohiniyattam comes from the words "Mohini" (meaning a woman who enchants onlookers) and "attam" (meaning graceful and sensuous body movements). The word "Mohiniyattam" literally means "dance of the enchantress".

Bharati Shivaji was born in 1948 in the temple town of Kumbakonam, in Tanjavur district of the south Indian state of Tamil Nadu, and had her early training in Bharatnatyam under Lalita Shastri and Odissi under Kelucharan Mohapatra. Later, on advice from Kamaladevi Chattopadhyay, renowned social reformer, she took up research on Mohiniyattom, the traditional dance form of Kerala. After obtaining a research fellowship from Sangeet Natak Akademi, she traveled to Kerala and pursued research under Kavalam Narayana Panicker, a scholar of the Temple Arts of Kerala and former vice-chairman of Sangeet Natak Akademi. Shifting her focus from Bharatnatyam and Odissi, she started training Mohiniyattom under Radha Marar and, later, under Kalamandalam Satyabhama, and also had a training stint under Kalamandalam Kalyanikutty Amma, considered by many as the Mother of Mohiniyattom.

== Legacy ==
Moving to New Delhi, Shivaji founded the dance academy, Center for Mohiniyattom, a dedicated facility for promoting the dance form. She is known to have contributed to the evolution of the dance tradition, by adding more languor to the already languorous discipline, and by adapting it to other dance forms such as ballet; her Mohiniyattom adaptation of the Swan Lake of Tchaikovsky, choreographed along with her daughter, Vijayalakshmi, is one such effort. Her productions include adaptations of Bhanusinger Padavali of Rabindranath Tagore, Chandrotsavam of the Manipravalam, Somastuthi from the Rig Veda, and the Devagita, from Ashtapadi. She is known to have incorporated postures, movements and music from other Traditional art forms of Kerala such as Ottamthullal, Kaikottikali, Thayambaka and Krishnanattam into Mohiniyattom, a legacy from her tutelage under Kavalam Narayana Panicker.

In 1986, Shivaji published his first book, Art of Mohiniyattam, co-authored by Avinash Pasricha. The book documents her researches under Sangeet Natak Akademi fellowship and a subsequent senior fellowship from the Department of Culture under the Ministry of Human Resource Development and is a reference book on the subject. She published another book, Mohiniyattam, co-written by her daughter, Vijayalakshmi, herself a noted Mohiniyattom performer, in 2003. The book deals with the history and evolution of the art form and comments about the styles and techniques, repertoire, music, costumes and jewellery associated with it. She has performed on several stages in India and abroad and has taught many Indian and foreign students. She also continues her research by visiting temples and gives lecture-demonstrations on the dance form at conferences and seminars.

== Awards and honours ==
Shivaji was awarded the Sangeet Natak Akademi Award in 1999–2000. Four years later, the Government of India included her in the 2004 Republic Day Honours list for the fourth highest civilian award of the Padma Shri. She is a recipient of the Sahitya Kala Parishad Samman, Lasya Lakshmi title from Kunchan Nambiar Memorial Trust, Kerala and Nritya Choodamani title from the Krishna Gana Sabha, Chennai. She won the Nishagandhi Puraskaram of the Government of Kerala in 2017.

Sara and Urs Baur, two American filmmakers, have made a documentary, Beyond Grace, on Mohiniyattom and the art of Shivaji which features her daughter, Vijayalakshmi, too. The 78-minute film, which details the work of the mother-daughter combination, was premiered on 9 July 2011 at the Raleigh Theatre, Hollywood, Los Angeles.

== Bibliography ==
- Bharati Shivaji, Avinash Pasricha (1986). Art of Mohiniyattam. Lancer, India. p. 107. ISBN 978-8170620037.
- Bharati Shivaji, Vijayalakshmi (2003). Mohiniyattam. Wisdom Tree. ISBN 9788186685365.

== See also ==
- Mohiniyattom
- Kelucharan Mohapatra
- Kamaladevi Chattopadhyay
- Kavalam Narayana Panicker
- Kalamandalam Satyabhama
- Kalamandalam Kalyanikutty Amma
