= Rele =

Rele may refer to:

== People ==
- Abe Reles (1906–1941), a New York Jewish-American mobster
- C. P. Rele (1928–2010), a Hindustani classical musician
- Kanak Rele (1937–2023), an Indian dancer and a choreographer.
- Ryhor Reles (1913–2004), a Belarusian-Jewish writer
- Yatin Rele (born 1933), an Indian former first-class cricketer

== Other uses ==
- Rele Art Gallery, a contemporary art space and gallery in Lagos, Nigeria
- Rele River, a river in the commune of Santa Juana
