= Sunanda Nair =

Indian dancer

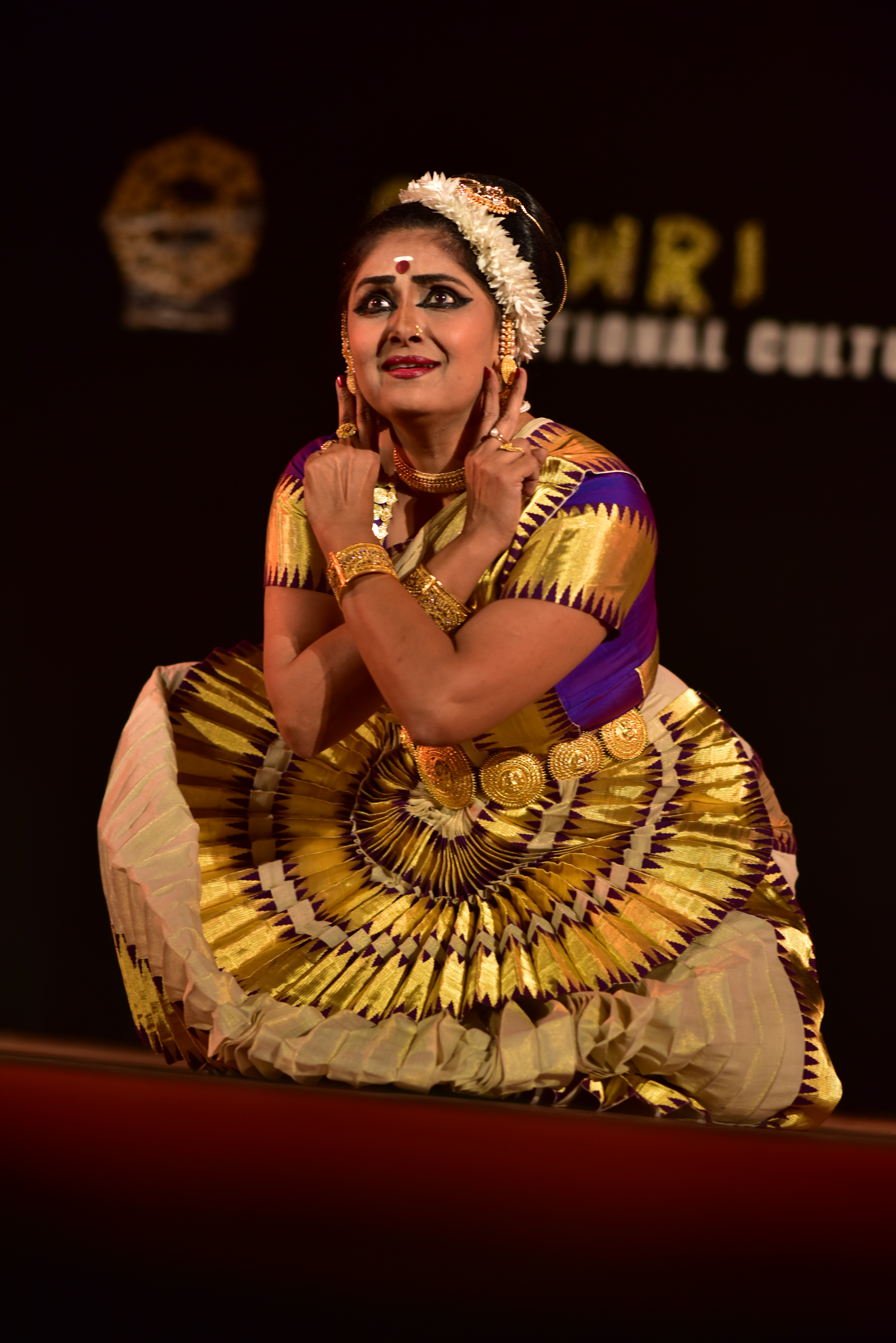
- Born: Mumbai, Maharashtra, India
- Education: University of Mumbai (PhD)
- Occupations: Founder/Director, Sunanda's Performing Arts Center
- Career
- Dances: MOHINIATTAM; Bharatanatyam; Kathakali
- Website: www.sunandanair.com

Sunanda Nair is an Indian dancer trained in Mohiniattam. She earned a master's degree in this dance form from the Nalanda Nritya Kala Mahavidyalaya which is affiliated with the University of Mumbai. She earned a PhD from the University of Mumbai for her thesis "An Intrinsic Lyrical Feminism in Mohiniattam" . She was born in Mumbai, India.

== Early life and education ==
Nair started training in Bharatanatyam at the age of six. She studied in Kathakali under Kalamandalam Krishnankutty Warrier.

Nair is a disciple of Mohiniattam exponent Kanak Rele, credited for the revival and popularisation of this classical Kerala dance style.

Nair was the first student to earn a master's degree in Mohiniattam when she was a student of Nalanda Nritya Kala Mahavidyalay at the University of Mumbai. She completed a seven-year course in five years. The institution is the closest to the guru Kula Sampradaya.

She also has a bachelor's degree in commerce and, a bachelor's & master's in Performing Arts, from the University of Mumbai.

== Career ==
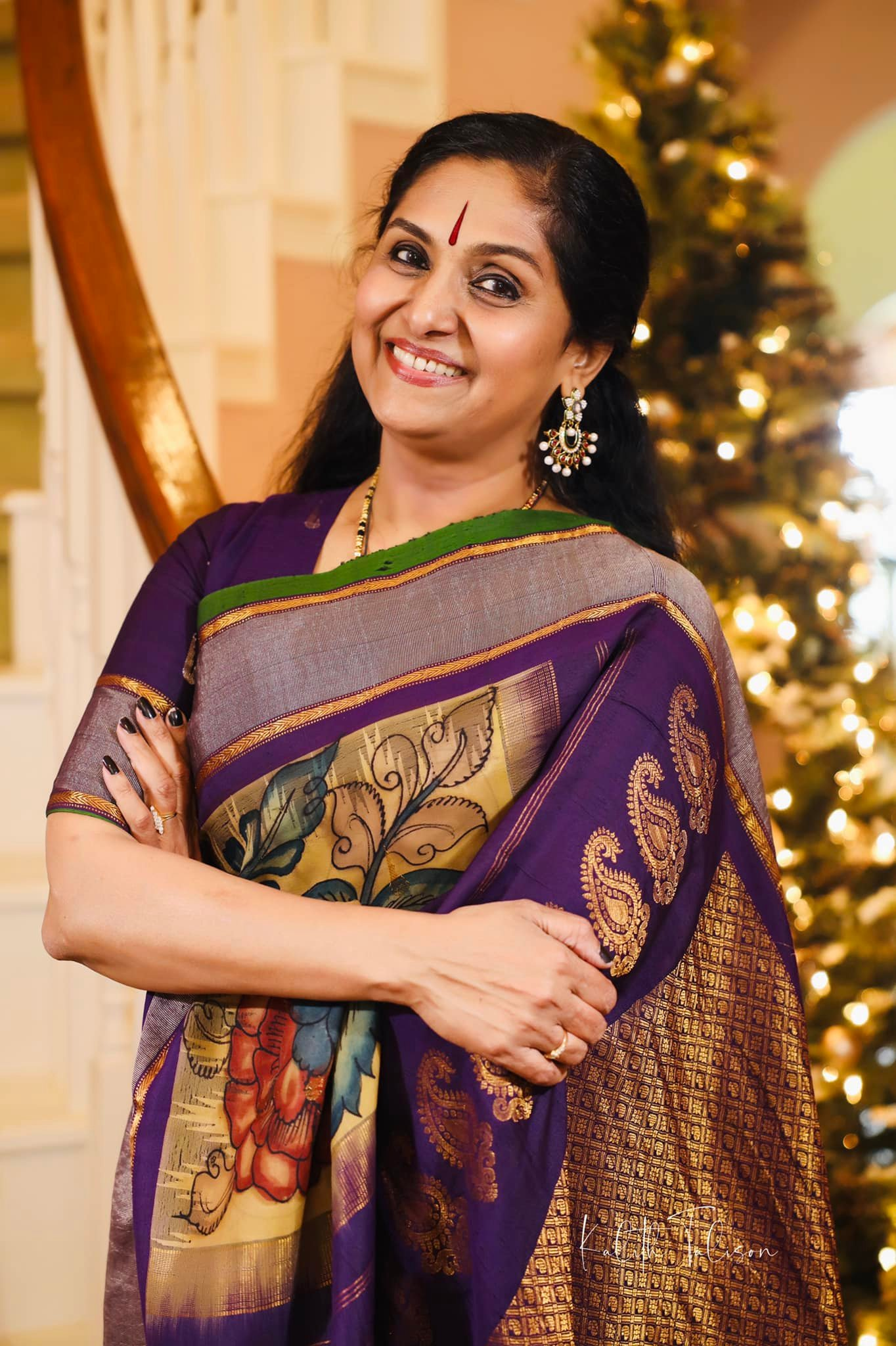

After graduating, she joined the faculty at Nalanda and served as a lecturer at her alma mater for nine years until 1999. She passed her Net exam, a UGC requirement to continue teaching at Nalanda.

She has given many performances.

She studied from masters like Kalaimamani Kadirvelu, Kalaimamani Mahalingam Pillai, T.V.Sounderajan, Dipak Majumdar, and Tejiswini Rao in Kattumanar Muthukumar Pillai's bani.

In 1980, while in high school, she started the Srutilaya Institute of Fine Arts which trains students in both Mohiniattam and Bharatanatyam.

SPARC is now in its 10th year of operation in the US. At SPARC, the rich tradition of Indian Classical Dance is passed to new dancers.

== Performances ==
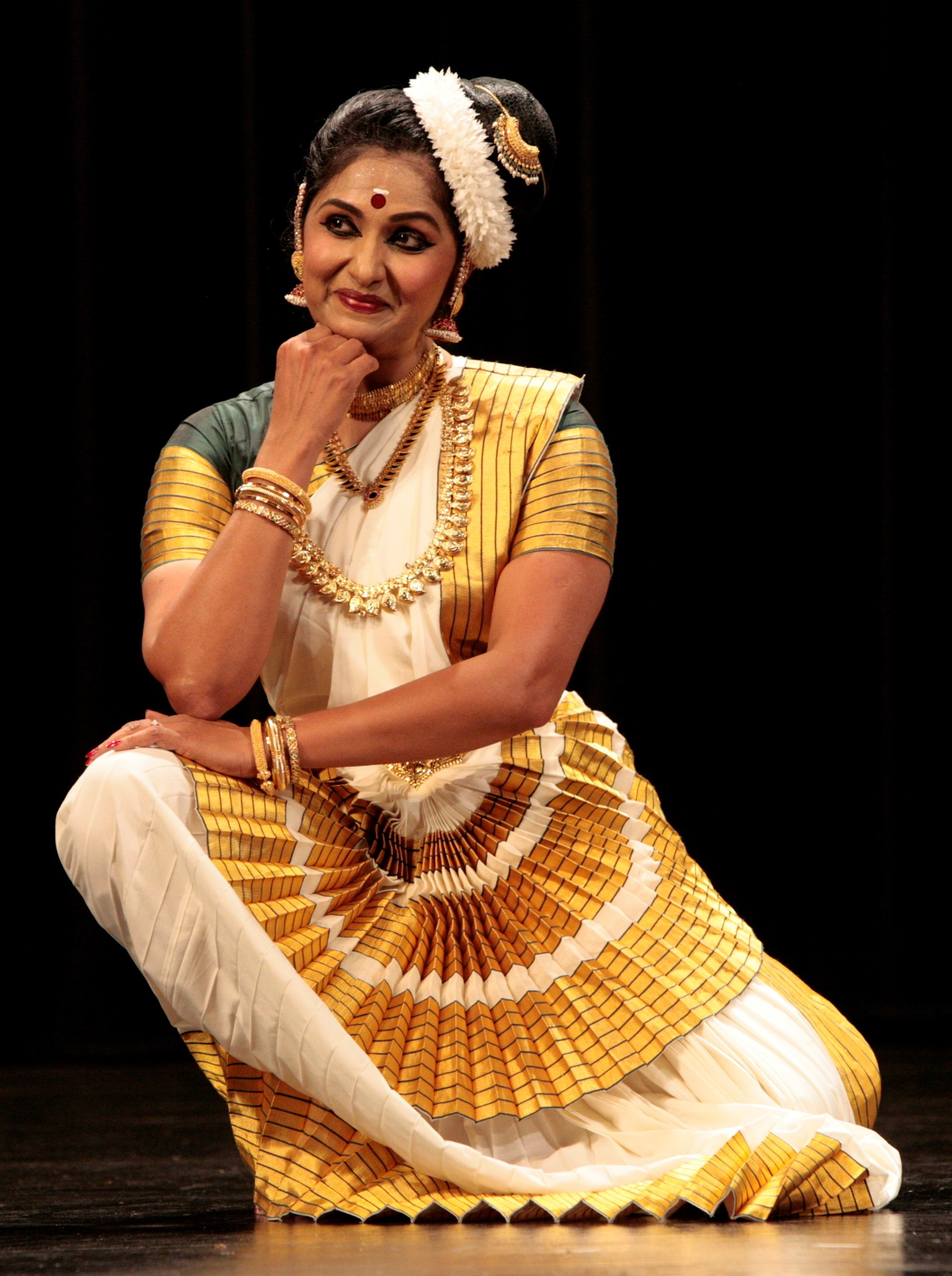
Sunanda Nair is one of the leading exponents of Mohiniattam in the country today.

- Festival of India in the former USSR
- Spring Friendship Art Festival in North Korea
- Performances in Middle East, Singapore and U.S.
- Khajuraho festival in Madhya Pradesh
- Konark festival in Orissa
- Yuva Mahotsav in Jaipur, Jodhpur and Udaipur
- Nishagandhi, Kerala Tourism, Trivandrum
- Kalidas Samaraoh, Ujjain
- Modera Festival, Gujarat
- Mysore Dassera Festival
- Nrityotsava, Central Sangeet Natak Akademi, Bangalore
- Indo-Indonesian Friendship Society
- Vallathol Jayanti, Kerala Kalamandalam
- SAARC Conference, Mumbai
- Sangeeta Sabha, Poona
- Swati Tirunal Sangeet Sabha, Trivandrum
- Chakradhar Samaraoh, Rajasthan Sangeet Natak Akademi
- India International Centre, Apna Utsav, New Delhi
- Krishna Gana Sabha, Bharat Kalachar, Bharatiya Music and Arts, Madras
- The National Centre For Performing Arts, Mumbai
- Haridas Sangeet Sammelan, Mumbai
- Kal-Ke-Kalakar, Mumbai
- Nitya Nityati And Tanmai Arohanam Festival, Bangalore
- India Habitat Centre, New Delhi
- Shree Chitra Dance Festival, Trivandrum
- Natyanjali Trust, Music Academy, Chennai
- National Festival of Mohini Attam, Nehru Center, Mumbai
- Soorya Parampara dance festival, Trivandrum, Kerala
- India Habitat Center, New Delhi
- Dharini, Cochin, Kerala
- Monsoon Festival Art India, New Delhi
- Raindrops Festival NCPA, Samved Mumbai
- Bharatam, Trichur, Kerala
- Sopanam, Bombay
- Kalakshetram, Bombay
- Asia Pacific Heritage Festival
- Kerala Sangeet Natak Academy -July 2015, Bhopal

== Recognition ==
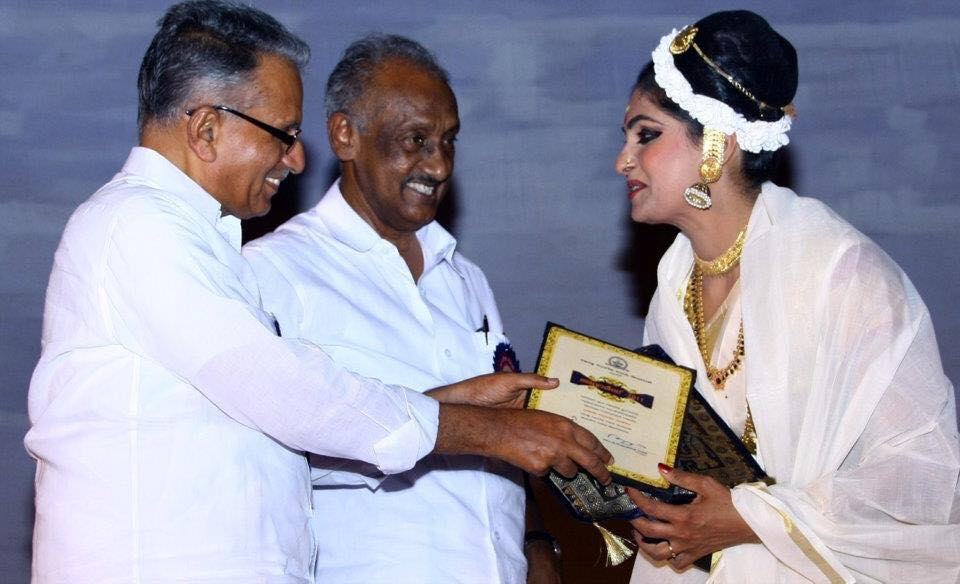
Receiving Kalasree Award by Kerala Sangeetha Nataka Akademi in 2011

- 'Global Mannam award', Nair Service Society of North America, New York 2020
- 'Nrithya Seva Mani award', Cleveland Thyagaraja Festival 2020
- 'Global Excellence Award for Performing Arts', 6th International Media Conference 2019
- 'Citation' from Bangalore Club for Kathakali & the Arts 2018
- 'Muthirai Pathitha Vithagar', Natyanjali Festival, Natyanjali Trust 2018
- 'Anantha Margaseersha Natya Puraskaram', NSSONA, Nair Sangamam 2018
- 'Nalanda Kanaka Nartana Puraskaar', Nalanda Dance Research Centre 2017
- ‘Kalarathnam’ from Kerala Kalamandalam 2016.
- Kerala Sangeetha Nataka Akademi Award (Kalasree Award) 2011
- 'Global Excellence Award' 2011, from GIA, New Delhi
- "Kalaasagar" 2010 in memory of Late Kalamandalam Krishnankutty Poduval
- "Abhinaya shiromani" from Surya Performing Arts, Missouri, US.
- Scholarship from Central Sangeet Natak Akademi for advanced training in abhinaya and choreography
- 'Singar Mani' from Sur Singar Samsad, Mumbai
- Nelluvai Nambeeshan Smarak Award for Mohiniattam
- 'Natya Mayuri' Natyanjali Trust, Chennai
- Best Ethnic Classical Arts Award, New Orleans, 2003
- Louisiana State Artist Roster
- Louisiana Touring Directory
- Global Excellence Dance Award, New Orleans
- Presidents Award for Community Service, Indian Assoc of New Orleans

== See also ==
- Indian women in dance
