= 1956–57 Ranji Trophy =

Indian cricket tournament

- The Ranji Trophy
- Administrator: BCCI
- Cricket format: First-class
- Tournament format: Knockout
- Champions: Bombay (9th title)
- Participants: 22
- Most runs: Ramnath Kenny (Bombay) (529)
- Most wickets: Polly Umrigar (Bombay) (35)

The 1956–57 Ranji Trophy was the 23rd season of the Ranji Trophy. Bombay won the title defeating Services in the final.

== Zonal Matches ==
=== West Zone ===
Round 1
24 Nov 1956 – Khadakvasla
Maharashtra	332
Saurashtra	83 & 88

Round 2
8 Dec 1956 – Bombay
Bombay	525 & 49/1
Gujarat	222 & 366
18 Jan 1957 – Nasik
Maharashtra	441
Baroda	226 & 358/6

Round 3
12 Feb 1957 – Bombay
Bombay	657/9d
Maharashtra	171 & 193

=== North Zone ===
Round 1
8 Dec 1956 – Delhi
Delhi	271 & 87/1
Eastern Punjab	166 & 190
13 Jan 1957 – Delhi
Services	246 & 85
PEPSU	164 & 121

Round 2
9 Feb 1957 – Delhi
Services	289 & 269
Delhi	221 & 218/7

=== South Zone ===
Round 1
12 Jan 1957 – Guntur
Andhra	171 & 201/3
Travancore-Cochin	180 & 185

Round 2
14 Dec 1956 – Salem
Madras	431 & 329/6d
Hyderabad	310 & 194/7
30 Jan 1957 – Guntur
Andhra	266 & 234/8d
Mysore	296 & 215/8

Round 3
15 Feb 1957 – Madras
Madras	384 & 128/3
Mysore	251 & 254/9d

=== Central Zone ===
Round 1
15 Dec 1956 – Banaras
Uttar Pradesh	238 & 56/1
Madhya Pradesh	116 & 177
22 Dec 1956 – Indore
Madhya Bharat	91 & 184
Rajasthan	594/8d

Round 2
2 Feb 1957 – Banaras
Uttar Pradesh	310 & 342/5
Rajasthan	256

=== East Zone ===
Round 1
26 Jan 1957 – Jorhat
Assam	54 & 245
Bengal	505
22 Dec 1956 – Jamshedpur
Bihar	217 & 254/4
Orissa	196 & 350/7d

Round 2
9 Feb 1957 – Calcutta
Bengal	356
Bihar	124 & 83

== Inter-Zonal Knockout matches ==
Quarter-finals
2 Mar 1957 – Banaras
Uttar Pradesh	147 & 229
Bombay	575

Semi-finals
23 Feb 1957 – Calcutta
Bengal	302/4
Services (T)	399
16 Mar 1957 – Bombay
Bombay	634/9d
Madras	150 & 161

Final
29 Mar 1957 – Delhi
Services	171 & 150
Bombay	359/7d

(T) – Advanced to final by spin of coin.

=== Final ===
29 March – 1 April 1957
Scorecard

Services (H)	v	Bombay
171 (87.4 overs); Chandrasekhar Gadkari 53; Polly Umrigar 4/65		359/7 decl (142 overs); Yatin Rele 162*; N. P. Jagdishan 3/51
150 (77.1 overs); Chandrasekhar Gadkari 40; K. R. Panjri 5/57

Bombay won by an innings and 38 runs
Roshanara Club Ground, Delhi
Umpires: Noshirvan Nagarwala and M. G. Vijayasarathi

- Toss not known

== Scorecards and averages ==
- CricketArchive
