= Kanak Rele =

Indian dancer (1937–2023)

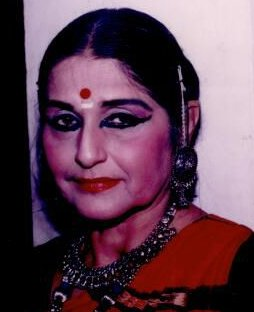
- Born: 11 June 1937; Gujarat, British India
- Died: 22 February 2023 (aged 85); Mumbai, Maharashtra, India
- Occupations: Classical dancer; choreographer; academic
- Known for: Mohiniyattam
- Spouse: Yatindra Rele
- Children: 1
- Awards: Padma Bhushan; Padma Shri; Sangeet Natak Akademi Award; Kalidas Samman; Gaurav Puraskar; Kala Vipanchee; M. S. Subbulakshmi Award

Kanak Rele (11 June 1937 – 22 February 2023) was an Indian dancer, choreographer, and academic best known as an exponent of Mohiniyattam. She was the founder-director of the Nalanda Dance Research Centre and the founder-principal of the Nalanda Nritya Kala Mahavidyalaya in Mumbai.

== Early life and education ==
Born in Gujarat on 11 June 1937, Rele spent a part of her childhood in Santiniketan and in Kolkata with her uncle. At Santiniketan she had the opportunity to watch Kathakali and Mohiniyattam performances, which she claimed helped shape her artistic sensibilities.

Rele was a qualified lawyer with an LL.B. from the Government Law College, Mumbai and a diploma in international law from the University of Manchester. She also held a PhD in dance from the University of Mumbai.

Rele and her husband Yatindra had one son. She died in Mumbai on 22 February 2023.

== Mohiniyattam artiste ==
Rele was also a Kathakali artiste having been trained under Guru "Panchali" Karunakara Panicker since the age of seven. Her initiation into Mohiniyattam came much later under Kalamandalam Rajalakshmi. A grant from the Sangeet Natak Akademi and later the Ford Foundation helped her delve deeper into her interest in Mohiniyattam and during 1970–71 she traveled to Kerala filming exponents of the dance form such as Kunjukutty Amma, Chinnammu Amma, and Kalyanikutty Amma. The project helped acquaint her with the nuances of Mohiniyattam and record its traditional and technical styles while also enabling her to evolve a teaching methodology for it. Her study of these artistes and their technique against the backdrop of classical texts like Natya Shastra, Hastalakshana Deepika, and Balarama Bharatam led her to develop her own style of Mohiniyattam dubbed the Kanaka Rele School of Mohiniyattam.

Rele's concept of body kinetics in dance is a pioneering innovation that disaggregates body movements in Mohiniyattam using a notation system. She is credited with having played a key role in the revival and popularisation of Mohiniyattam and for having brought a scientific temper and academic rigour to it.

== Notable choreographies ==
Rele is noted for the contemporisation of mythological tales in her performances and her portrayal of strong women characters in them, which is a marked departure from the traditional Mohiniyattam theme of the nayika pining for love. Some of her notable subjects and choreographies include Kubja, Kalyani, Silappadikaram, and Swapnavasavadattam.

Rele's association with the Malayalam poet and scholar Kavalam Narayana Panicker led to her introduction to Sopana Sangeetham and creation of choreographic pieces set to Sopana Sangeetam's talas. Rele credited Kavalam's compositions as being inspirational for several of her choreographies that "highlight the trauma of women in society based on women characters in mythology".

Nritya Bharati, a documentary on India's classical dances produced by Rele's Nalanda Dance Research Centre has been acquired by the Ministry of External Affairs as the official capsule for all Indian missions abroad. The Enlightened One — Gautama Buddha, which premiered in 2011, was a choreographic piece created against the backdrop of the 26/11 attacks on Mumbai.

== Academic career ==
Rele was instrumental in beginning the Department of Fine Arts at the University of Mumbai and also served as its dean. Rele established the Nalanda Dance Research Centre in 1966 and the Nalanda Nritya Kala Mahavidyalay in 1972. The Nalanda Dance Research Centre, Mumbai which trains students for a university degree in Mohiniyattam is recognised as a research institute by the Ministry of Science and Technology. Rele also served as an expert and advisor on dance to the Department of Culture of the Government of India and the Planning Commission and was part of the University Grants Commission's curriculum development team and a consultant to Indian and foreign universities in developing academic dance courses.

== Awards and honours ==
Rele was conferred the Gaurav Puraskar by the Government of Gujarat in 1989 and the Padma Shri, the fourth-highest civilian award in the Republic of India, in 1990. She was honoured with the title Kala Vipanchee by Vipanchee, a pioneering institution for Indian music and dance, in 2005. In 2006, the Government of Madhya Pradesh conferred the Kalidas Samman on her for her contributions to and excellence in the field of classical dance. She was also a recipient of the Sangeet Natak Akademi Award and the M. S. Subbulakshmi Award. In 2013, she was conferred the Padma Bhushan by the Government of India.

== Books ==
- Mohinī Āțțam: The Lyrical Dance
- Bhaava Niroopanna
- A Handbook of Indian Dance Terminology

== See also ==
- Indian women in dance
