= Nishagandhi Puraskaram =

- നിശാഗന്ധി പുരസ്കാരം
- Awarded for: Excellence in dance and music
- Location: Trivandrum, Kerala
- Country: India
- Presented by: Kerala Tourism Department
- Rewards: ₹150,000 (US$1,600), Citation & statuette
- First award: 2013
- Final award: 2018
- Winners: Mrinalini Sarabhai (2013); V. P. Dhananjayan & Shantha Dhananjayan (2018)
- Website: www.keralatourism.org

Nishagandhi Puraskaram or Nishagandhi award (Malayalam : നിശാഗന്ധി പുരസ്കാരം) is an annual award instituted by the Tourism Department of Kerala in India to honour personalities in the fields of music and dance . The award carries a cash prize of 1,50,000 Indian Rupees, a citation, and a statuette. It is presented annually on behalf of the Nishagandhi Dance and Music Festival, a cultural programme organized by the Tourism Department of Kerala every year.

The seven-day long Nishagandhi festival is held in January at the Nishagandhi amphitheater near the Kanakakkunnu Palace in Trivandrum, the capital city of Kerala. The award was established in 2013 to popularise the Festival in the national and international level.

== History ==
Nishagandhi Puraskaram was first awarded to the classical dancer Mrinalini Sarabhai in 2013. Hindustani musician Lalith J. Rao won the award in the next year. Dr Padma Subrahmanyam, an exponent in Bharata Natyam, won the award in 2015. Musician Ilayaraja won the award in 2016 for his contribution to the Indian film music industry.

The Governor of Kerala P. Sathasivam presented the Nishagandhi Puraskaram to Bharati Shivaji, an exponent in Mohiniyattom, in 2017. Vannadil Pudiyaveettil Dhananjayan and Shanta Dhananjayan are popularly known as Dhananjayans got Nishagandhi Puraskaram in 2018.

== Laureates ==
Presented Year	Image	Winner	Contributions	Notes
2013		Mrinalini Sarabhai	"for her excellence in Classical dance."	
2014		Lalith J. Rao	"for the contributions in Hindustani Classical Music"	
2015		Padma Subrahmanyam	"for her eminent contributions in Bharata Natyam"	
2016		Ilaiyaraaja	"for his artistic excellence and contribution to the Indian film music industry"	
2017		Bharati Shivaji	"for her contributions in Mohiniyattom"	
2018		V. P. Dhananjayan & Shantha Dhananjayan	"for their contributions in Bharata Natyam"	
2019		Kalamandalam Kshemavathy	"for her contributions in Mohiniyattam"	
2020		C. V. Chandrasekhar	"for his contributions in Bharatanatyam"	
