= Padmanabhan Nair =

Kathakali exponenet (1927-2007)

Kalamandalam Padmanabhan Nair
- Great Kathakali reformer.
- Born: 7 October 1928; Vellinezhi, Malabar district, Madras Presidency, British India
- Died: 3 April 2007 (aged 78); Shoranur, Palakkad district, Kerala, India
- Spouse: Kalamandalam Satyabhama
- Website: www.kalapadmanabhatrust.co.in

Kalamandalam Padmanabhan Nair (1928–2007) was an eminent Kathakali exponent, equally known for his capacities as a tutor, theoretician and author of a few authentic texts on the classical dance-drama from Kerala in south India. A son of the Kathakali guru Pattikkamthodi Ravunni Menon, Padmanabhan Nair was one of the early-batch students in Kerala Kalamandalam, where he subsequently joined as a teacher and retired as its principal in 1990. He died on 3 April 2007, at his home in Shoranur, near his alma mater, where he led his post-professorial life with wife and Mohiniyattam exponent and guru, Kalamandalam Satyabhama.

== Early life ==
Padmanabhan Nair was born on 7 October 1928 in Kuruvattoor near the Kathakali village of Vellinezhi in the erstwhile Valluvanad territory, now in Palakkad district. After primary schooling, he joined Kalamandalam when he was ten years old. His master was his father, under whom he learnt the art form for over a decade. Srikrishnan in the classical storyplay Subhadraharanam was his debut stage. Padmanabhan Nair also underwent Kathakali studies at the PSV Natyasangham, Kottakkal, before being recruited in Kalamandalam in 1951.

== Publications ==
Padmanabhan Nair has co-authored a book on his father-guru Pattikkamthodi. But his more weighty works are Kathakali Vesham (1980) and Cholliyattam (2000), both two-volume tomes that deal with the grammar and aesthetics of classical storyplays in the highly evolved Kalluvazhi school of Kathakali of north-central Kerala. His another book is Attakkatha Saram which contains the saram of seventeen Attakkathas. He was a winner of the Kerala Sangeetha Nataka Akademi Award (1991), the Government of India's Central Sangeet Natak Akademi award (1994) and the Kerala government's Kathakali Purasakaram (2006) as well as Odakkuzhal award (2004) for Malayalam literature for his book Natyachariante Jeevithamudrakal co-authored by Prof. Nhayath Balan. He was often described as the last word in Kathakali grammar for his in-depth knowledge and mastery of the technical and aesthetic elements of the art. The cholliyattam of the most stylish characters in Kathakali especially from the classic plays of Kottayath Thamburan and Kottarakkara Thamburan performed by Padmanabhan Nair and filmed by late David Bolland (London) in 1985 at Kerala Kalamandalam is considered the most valuable document by researchers and connoisseurs of Katakali to learn the rudiments of its body language.

Website:www.kalapadmanabhatrust.co.in
