= Thottassery Chinnammu Amma =

Indian dance teacher (1900–1977)

- Born: 1900; Pazhayannur, Kingdom of Cochin
- Died: 4 August 1977 (aged 76–77)
- Other name: Thottasseri Chinnammu Amma
- Occupations: Mohiniyattam dancer, dance teacher
- Known for: Revival of Mohiniyattam, first ever recipient of Sangeet Natak Akademi Award in Mohiniyattam.
- Awards: Sangeet Natak Akademi Award (1972)

Thottassery Chinnammu Amma (also spelled as Thottasseri Chinnammu Amma) was a Mohiniyattam dancer and dance teacher from Kerala, India. She was one of the key figures in the revival of this classical dance, which was almost on the verge of extinction in early 20th century. In 1972, she received first ever Sangeet Natak Akademi Award in Mohiniyattam.

== Biography ==
Thottassery Chinnammu Amma was born in 1900 into a prominent family in Pazhayannur in present-day Thrissur district of Kerala. Under the guidance of Parameshwara Bhagavathar, who was in Swathi Thirunal's Rajya Sabha, Mohiniyattam dance was taught in Nair homes in Palakkad region. Chinnammu Amma was a member of one of this Nair family. At an early age she became a disciple of the Kalamozhi Krishna Menon, a renowned Mohiniyattam guru, and mastered the Mohiniyattam. Chinnammu Amma finished her studies at the age of thirteen. She also studied under gurus A. Krishna Panicker of Koratty, near Thrissur and T. Narayanan Nair. When she started performing, Krishna Panicker also accompanied her as Nattuvanar.

Chinnammu Amma died on August 4, 1977.

== Career ==
Chinnammu Amma was one of the key figure in the revival of the classical dance form Mohiniyattam. In the early 20th century, Mohiniyattam, the only women's classical dance in Kerala, was almost on the verge of extinction. When poet Vallathol established Kerala Kalamandalam to revive and preserve performing arts of Kerala, he had difficulty even finding someone to teach Mohiniyattam there. He included parts of Mohiniyattam at Kalamandalam along with training in female roles in Kathakali. But his attempts to revive Mohiniyattam in 1932 and 1937 were unsuccessful. At that time, performing this dance form was considered abhorrent, so there was no one to learn or teach it.

Meanwhile, in 1950, Chinnammu Amma went to Kalamandalam to perform Mohiniyattam on Vallathol's birthday. Seeing this performance, he invited her to teach at Kalamandalam and in 1950, Chinnammu Amma entered there as a Mohiniyattam teacher. Chinnammu Amma, who had mastered this dance in her youth but did not continue it later, accepted the position of teacher in the Kalamandalam after much persuasion and requests. She remembered many things she had learned in her youth and passed them on to her students. Prominent dancers including Kalamandalam Sathyabhama, Kalamandalam Chandrika, and Kalamandalam Kshemavathy were Chinnammu Amma's disciples. She retired from there in 1963.

During the reformation processes of Mohiniyattam, in the 1950s, Kalamandalam focussed on the classical training of the six basic forms of Mohiniyattam dance, recalled by Chinnammu Amma. Her style was characterized by slow diction, soft body movements, and cultured acting. This later became the Kalamandalam style with minor variations and modifications.

None of the early teachers of Kalamandalam, including Chinnammu Amma, had any sympathy on dancers who sacrificed artistic values for the sake of public popularity. Chinnammu Amma and Kalamandalam Sathyabhama, who was a prominent disciple of her, were teachers who worked hard to nurture this art with its traditional purity and without going solely with public taste.

== Awards and honors ==
In 1972, she received first ever Sangeet Natak Akademi Award in Mohiniyattam.
