= Lalith J. Rao =

Indian classical singer (1942–2026)

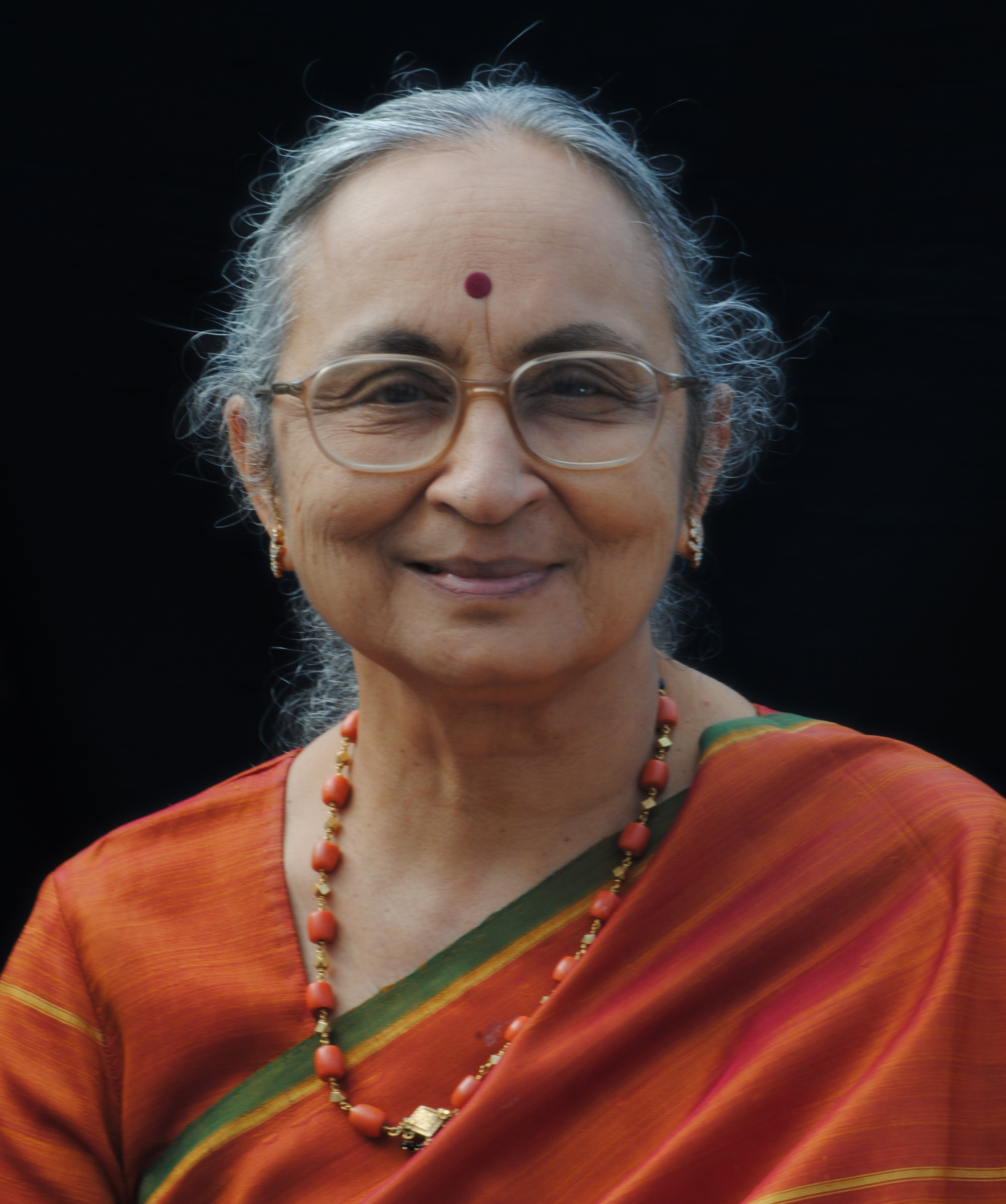
- Rao in 2013

Background information
- Born: Lalith Rao; 6 November 1942; Bangalore, Kingdom of Mysore, India
- Died: 3 June 2026 (aged 83) Bengaluru, Karnataka, India
- Genre: Indian classical music
- Occupations: Engineer, singer

Lalith J. Rao (also spelt Lalit; 6 November 1942 – 3 June 2026) was an Indian classical singer and a representative of the Agra gharana (singing style).

== Early life ==
Rao's introduction to classical music was at the age of three, at a concert by the Agra gharana vocalist Faiyaz Khan. She started learning music from Rama Rao Naik, who initiated her into the Agra gharana. Rao's first public concert was at the Bangalore Sangeet Sabha at the age of 12. When she was 14, she won the All India Classical Music competition in Mumbai and became the youngest participant of the Swami Haridas Sangeet Sammelan the same year.

Rao completed her bachelor's degree and Masters in Electrical Communication Engineering, the latter from the University of New Brunswick. In 1967, she married Jayavanth Rao and moved to Delhi to work. Her husband convinced Rao to abandon her engineering career and pursue singing, and she received training from Dinkar Kaikini and later from Khadim Hussain Khan.

== Singing career ==
Rao went back to the Sur Singar Sansad to restart her performance career and became a professional singer after a positive reception. She was as adept at singing khyal, dhrupad, dhamar, as well as thumri, tarana and hori.

Her first concert abroad was in 1981. She performed in France, UK, US and Canada, and was a top-grade artiste of All India Radio. Rao regularly performed on the radio and television.

Rao was one of the key figures in setting up a trust "Sajan Milap" in the mid-seventies, to popularise the music of her Ustad, who used the pen name "Sajan Piya". She was the chief coordinator for the Ford Foundation Archival project at the ITC Sangeet Research Academy from 1989 to 1991. A few years later she herself sang for the Ethno-Musicology Department of the University of Washington in Seattle for them to archive the music of her Agra gharana.

== Personal life and death ==
Rao lived and taught music in Bangalore. Bharathi Prathap, Nishant Panicker, Manohar Patwardhan, Kailash Kulkarni, Pratima Bellave are some of her notable disciples.

Rao died on 3 June 2026, at the age of 83.

== Notable performances ==
- Sawai Gandharva Bhimsen Mahotsav in Pune, Hubli and Kundgol
- ITC-SRA Sangeet Sammelan in New Delhi, Agra, Jaipur, Jodhpur and other places
- Tansen Samaroh in Gwalior
- Vishnu Digambar Jayanti Utsav in Delhi
- Swami Haridas Sangeet Sammelan in Mumbai, Delhi, Mathura and Vrindavan
- Gunidas Sangeet Sammelan in Mumbai, Delhi and Bengaluru
- Music Circles and Sangeet Sabhas throughout the length and breadth of India
- Several successful concert tours of USA, Canada, UK, France and Switzerland.

== Awards and recognitions ==
- Gurumaa Annapurna Devi Award: Annapurna Devi Foundation, 2024
- Sangeet Natak Akademi Award: Government of India, 2018
- Karnataka Rajyotsava Award Rajyotsava Prashasti: Government of Karnataka, 2017
- Karnataka Sangeet Nritya Academy Gaurava Puraskar
- Karnataka Kalashree: Government of Karnataka 2011-2012
- Tana Riri award from the Gujarat State Sangeet Natak Akademi for lifetime achievement 2016
- Nishagandhi Puraskaram by the Government of Kerala 2014
- "Sur Mani": Sur Singar Sansad
- Lifetime Achievement award from Bangalore Gayana Samaja
- Lifetime Achievement Award: Puttaraj Samman
- BKF Mallikarjun Mansur Award 2014
- Ganakala Tapaswini by Srimad Vadiraja Aradhana Trust for life-time achievement in Hindustani Classical Music 2016
- Swaratapasvi by Swara Sankula, Mysore

== Partial discography ==
- Bihag; Kedar; Thumri (1986) His Master's Voice PSLP 1373
- Beyond Reach: Ragas Durga & Pilu (2003)
- Raga Darbari Kanhada, Raga Desh (2006)
- Raga Lalit (2002)
- Ragas Kalyan Nat & Adana (2002)
- Raga Shree (2013)
- Ragas Dhanashree & Barwa (2013)
- Ragas Gorakh Kalyan & Basant (2013)
