= Kalamandalam Satyabhama =

Indian classical dancer, teacher and choreographer

Satyabhama
- Born: 4 November 1937; Shornur, Palakkad, Kerala, India
- Died: 13 September 2015 (aged 77); Ottapalam, Palakkad, Kerala, India
- Resting place: Shornur, Palakkad, Kerala, India
- Spouse: Kalamandalam Padmanabhan Nair
- Children: Two sons and two daughters
- Awards: Padma Shri; Kerala Sangeetha Nataka Akademi Award; Sangeet Natak Akademi Award; Nruthya Natya Puraskaram; Kerala Kalamandalam Award; Swati Tirunal Puraskaram; Shadkala Govinda Marar Award

Kalamandalam V. Satyabhama (4 November 1937 – 13 September 2015) was an Indian classical dancer, teacher and choreographer, known for her performances and scholarship in Mohiniyattam. She was awarded the Padma Shri, in 2014, for her contributions to the art and culture, by the Government of India.

== Biography ==
I feel that my husband deserved the Padma Shri more, says Kalamandalam Satyabhama, on the Padma Shri award, I dedicate it to him

Satyabhama was born in November 4, 1937, in a family with limited financial resources, at Shornur, on the coast of Bharathapuzha, in Palakkad, in the south Indian state of Kerala, to Krishnan Nair, a petty businessman and Ammini Amma. She started learning dance, at a very early age, as a part-time student of Kerala Kalamandalam, under the tutelage of Kalamandalam Achutha Warrier and Kalamandalam Krishnankutty Warrier, concurrently with her academic schooling at Government High School, Shornur. After completing her 8th standard there, she joined Kalamandalam as a full-time student. That was when she started learning Mohiniyattom, under the Kalamandalam stalwart, Thottassery Chinnammu Amma, the first long-serving dance teacher at Kalamandalam, though the main focus of study remained Bharatanatyam. Chinnammu Amma introduced the young Satyabhama to various dance techniques such as adavu (basic movements), cholkettu, jathiswarams (syllables and musical notes) in Chenchurutty and Todi. Soon, the young girl came to the notice of the legendary Malayalam poet, Vallathol Narayana Menon, the founder of Kerala Kalamandalam, who nurtured the young aspirant's skills by providing her with a scholarship with which she could pay the school fees. She joined Kalamandalam as a student of in 1950 and became a teacher in 1957.

Satyabhama's debut on major stage was in 1955, during the silver jubilee celebrations of Kalamandalam, in front of the Prime Minister, Jawaharlal Nehru. The next six years of study at the institution gave her opportunities to visit Singapore and Malaysia, as a part of the touring Kalamandalam troupe, where she performed Bharatanatyam, Mohiniyattam and Kathakali. After completing the course, she joined Kalamandalam as a junior teacher. She also had a stint of training from the doyen of classical dance, Kalamandalam Kalyanikutty Amma.

It was during this time, Satyabhama met Kalamandalam Padmanabhan Nair, the noted Kathakali guru, widely regarded as the master of Kathakali grammar. Their acquaintance soon took a romantic turn, resulting in their marriage. Satyabhama and Padmanabhan Nair, at the time of the latter's death, had four daughters of which two are active in Mohiniyattam. She died on 13 September 2015, aged 77, at a hospital in Palakkad where she was undergoing treatment.

== Positions ==
Kalamandalam Satybhama was the first woman Vice Principal of Kerala Kalamandalam and, later, became its Principal till she retired in 1992. She sat on the selection committee to decide annual Kalamandalam fellowships She was also functioning as the Dean of Kerala Kalamandalam.

== Controversy ==
In 2024, Kalamandalam Satyabhama came under fire for colorist and sexist remarks, allegedly directed towards Mohiniyattam and Bharatanatyam dancer Dr. RLV Ramakrishnan during an interview with a YouTube channel.

She said:

"There is an artist in Chalakudy whose complexion is similar to the crow. Even the mother who gave birth to him cannot bear his performance. Besides Mohiniyattam is an art form where you have to keep the legs wide apart. It looks vulgar when men perform it. In my opinion men who performs Mohiniyattam should look fair."

In response, Mallika Sarabhai, the Chancellor of the Kerala Kalamandalam, described Satyabhama's remarks as "terrible" and added that it "reflects her racist and white slavish attitude." The Kerala Kalamandalam later announced that it would be opening its Mohiniyattam and Nangiar Koothu courses to male students.

== Legacy ==
Kalamandalam Satyabhama quietly retired from performances at a young age of 24 to attend to her duties a teacher and choreographer. As such, she is respected more for her contributions to the dance form than for her on stage performances.

Satyabhama is credited with purifying the dance form by weeding out external influences. She modified the performance techniques so that the emotive aspect of the performance strictly sticks to Lasyam. She is also said to have revolutionised the Mohiniyattam curriculum at Kerala Kalamandalam which is said to have resulted in the evolution of Kalamandalam style mohiniyattam. She also tried to add more spice into the presentation of the dance form by evoking drama through exaggerated body kinetics through mudras (palm and finger gestures), poses and steps, which at times, have also attracted criticism.

Another major contribution of Satyabhama is the changes she has brought to the Mohiniyattam costumes. The designs she has created follows Kerala traditions in color, pattern and accessories and have become the signature of Kalamandalam style. She also changed the way the dancer styles the hair, which was vaguely adapted from Raja Ravi Varma paintings.

She also left a rich legacy of 35 Mohiniyattam compositions, the details of which are narrated in her book, Mohiniyattam - History, Techniques and Performance.

== Awards and recognitions ==
Satyabhama was honoured with several awards and recognitions by regional and national bodies. Apart from the prestigious Padma Shri Award, she was the first to receive the Nruthya Natya Puraskaram of the Government of Kerala in 2005 and the first Swati Tirunal Puraskaram by Kollam Kathakali Club and Ttroupe, in 2006. Some of the notable awards bestowed on Satyabhama are:

- Padma Shri - 2014
- Kerala Sangeetha Nataka Akademi Fellowship - 2007
- Kerala Sangeetha Nataka Akademi Award - 1976
- Sangeet Natak Akademi Award, New Delhi - 1994
- Nruthya Natya Puraskaram of the Government of Kerala- 2005
- Kerala Kalamandalam Award - 1988
- Swati Tirunal Puraskaram
- Shadkala Govinda Marar Award - 2013

Kerala Kalamandalam has instituted an award, in honour of Satyabhama, which is distributed to deserving students of mohiniyattam, in the form of a scholarship annually.

== Publications ==
Satyabhama has published a treatise on Mohiniyattam in Malayalam, by name, Mohiniyattam - History, Techniques and Performance (Malayalam: മോഹിനിയാട്ടം - ചരിത്രം, സിദ്ധാന്തം, പ്രയോഗം) which is considered a referral book on the subject and consists of 11 chapters and 35 compositions by the writer.

- Kalamandalam Satyabhama. Mohiniyattam - History, Techniques and Performance. Mathrubhumi Books.

== See also ==
- Kalamandalam Padmanabhan Nair
- Kalamandalam Kalyanikutty Amma
- Mohiniyattam
