= Chandrasekhar Gadkari =

Indian cricketer

Personal information
- Full name: Chandrasekhar Vaman Gadkari
- Born: 3 February 1928; Pune, British India
- Died: 11 January 1998 (aged 69); Pune, Maharashtra, India
- Batting: Right-handed
- Bowling: Right-arm medium

International information
- National side: India
- Test debut (cap 69): 21 January 1953 v West Indies
- Last Test: 13 February 1955 v Pakistan

Career statistics
Competition	Test	First-class
Matches	6	64
Runs scored	129	3,024
Batting average	21.50	40.32
100s/50s	0/1	7/14
Top score	50*	145*
Balls bowled	102	3,079
Wickets	0	48
Bowling average	–	31.04
5 wickets in innings	–	2
10 wickets in match	–	0
Best bowling	–	6/37
Catches/stumpings	6/–	40
- Source: CricketArchive, 3 September 2022

Lt. Col. Chandrasekhar Vaman Gadkari (3 February 1928 – 11 January 1998) was an Indian Test cricketer and army officer.

Gadkari was an attacking batsman, medium-pace bowler and a great fielder. He made a fine impression as a fielder in the 1952/53 tour to West Indies in an Indian side that was noted for its fielding. He made 50 not out in the Georgetown Test, which remained his highest Test score. His other tour was to Pakistan in 1954/55. Gadkari co-holds the Test record with Shafiq Ahmed for the most matches played in a career without either winning or losing – 6.

Gadkari was commissioned into the army in 1949 and rose to become a lieutenant colonel. He represented Services in the Ranji Trophy thereafter. Army duties restricted his appearances in first-class cricket. He died in 1998 after a brief illness.
