= Yatin Rele =

Indian cricketer and banker

- Yatin and Kanak Rele in November 1957

Personal information
- Full name: Yatin Kashinath Rele
- Born: 26 September 1933 (age 93); Bombay, British India
- Batting: Right-handed
- Relatives: Kanak Rele (wife)

Domestic team information
- Years: Team
- 1953–54 to 1957–58: Bombay

Career statistics
Competition	First-class
Matches	12
Runs scored	616
Batting average	51.33
100s/50s	1/2
Top score	162*
Catches/stumpings	4/–
- Source: Cricinfo, 13 January 2024

Yatin Kashinath Rele (Note: Some sources give his first name as Yatindra.) (born 26 September 1933) is an Indian former first-class cricketer and banker.

Rele was an opening batsman. He played for Bombay University when they won the Rohinton Baria Trophy in 1954–55 and in 1955–56, when he captained the team. He represented Bombay in nine matches in the Ranji Trophy between 1955 and 1957, including the finals in 1955–56 and 1956–57, both of which Bombay won. In the 1956–57 final, after Services made 171 in their first innings, Rele batted throughout the Bombay innings, scoring 162 not out in a total of 359 for 7 declared off 142 overs; Bombay then dismissed Services for 150 to win by an innings.

Rele made his career as a banker, rising to a high position with the State Bank of India. He married the classical dancer Kanak Divecha in November 1957, and they had one son. Together they founded and built the Nalanda Nritya Kala Mahavidyalaya dance academy in Mumbai, which opened in 1973.
