= Balarama Bharatam =

Balarama Bharatam is a Sanskrit treatise on natyam. The author was the king of Travancore (1724–1798), known by the title 'Dharma Raja' or "the king of righteousness". The full name of the king was Karthika Thirunal Rama Varma and he was the Maharajah of Travancore from 1758 until his death in 1798. Being a scholar of music and dance and natyasastra, he compiled this treatise on natyasastra following the fundamental principles laid down by Bharatamuni in Natyasastra and Nadikeshwara in Natyadarpanam, He also considered the contents in Bhavaprakasanam of Saradatanaya.

The treatise 'Balarama Bharatam' is not a simple compilation of earlier texts. It is an extension of the earlier sastras with adaptation to contemporary contexts. Being an aspirant and reformer of Kathakali, he brought in several novel ideas of action, dramaturgy and theatrics in his classic treatise.
