= Mohiniyattam =

Classical dance of India

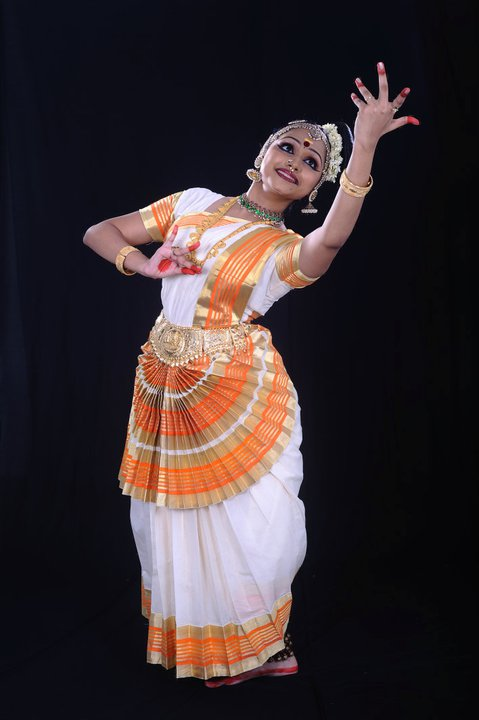
- Genre: Indian classical dance
- Origin: Kerala

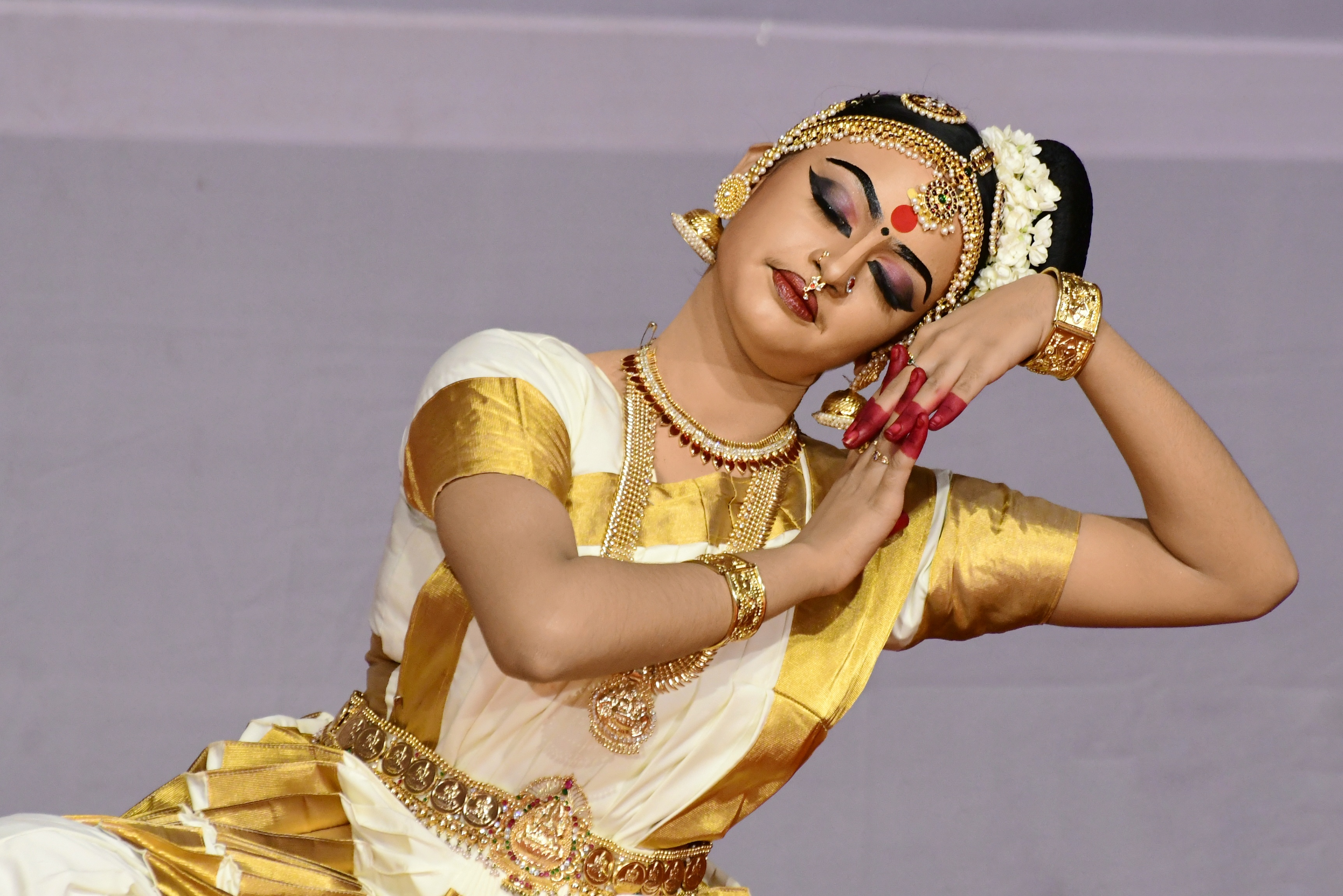
Performer at a Kannur district school dance festival, 2009

Mohiniyattam is an Indian classical dance form originating from the state of Kerala. The dance gets its name from Mohini—the female enchantress avatar of the Hindu deity Vishnu, who helps the devas prevail over the asuras using her feminine charm.

Mohiniyattam's roots, like all classical Indian dances, are in the Natya Shastra—the ancient Hindu Sanskrit text on performance arts. However, it follows the Lasya style described in Natya Shastra, that is a dance which is delicate, eros-filled and feminine. It is traditionally a solo dance performed by women after extensive training, though men also perform the dance in the contemporary period. The repertoire of Mohiniyattam includes music in the Carnatic style, singing, and acting a play through the dance, where the recitation may be either by a separate vocalist or the dancer themselves. The song is typically in Malayalam-Sanskrit hybrid called Manipravalam.

The earliest mention of the word is found in the 16th-century legal text Vyavahāramālā, but the likely roots of the dance are older. The dance was systematized in the 18th century, but was then ridiculed as a Devadasi prostitution system during the colonial British Raj; it was banned by a series of laws from 1931 through 1938, which was protested and partially repealed in 1940. The socio-political conflict ultimately led to the renewed interest in and the revival and reconstruction of Mohiniyattam by the people of Kerala, particularly the poet Vallathol Narayana Menon.

== Etymology ==
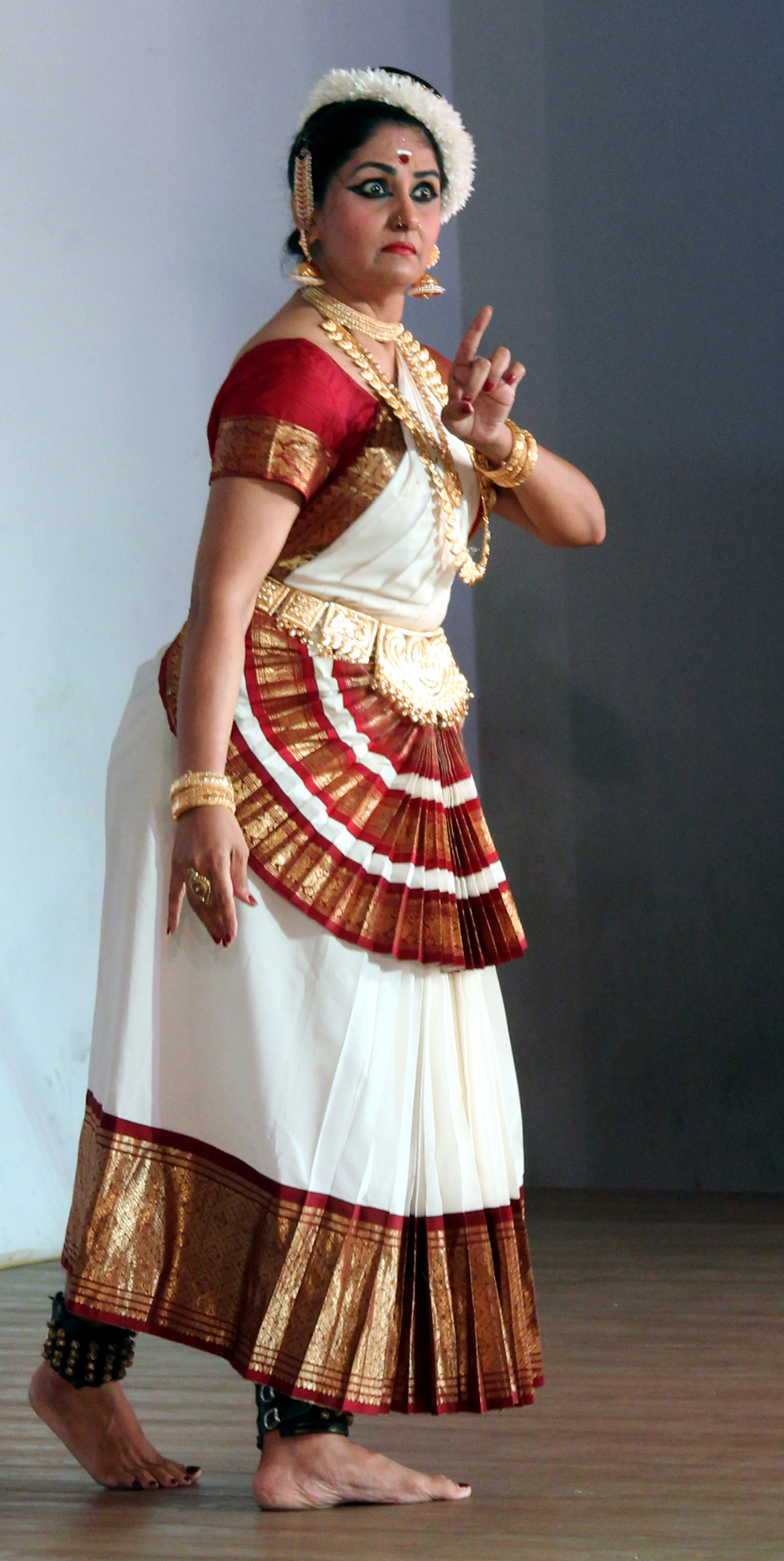
Mohiniattam dancer Sunanda Nair in motion.

Mohiniyattam, also referred to as Mohini-attam, is derived from Mohini – the Hindu deity of enchantmentand a female avatar of the Hindu deity Vishnu in Indian mythology.

Mohini appears in Hindu mythologies as a divine enchantress or a supreme seductress during a battle between Devas (good) and Asuras (evil), after the evil had won control of Amrita (nectar of immortality). Appearing in her youthful bloom, dressed rapturously, she uses her charms to seduce the Asuras, who seeking her favors, give her the Amrita to distribute among the evil forces. Mohini after gaining the Amrita gives it to the good instead, depriving the evil from gaining immortality.

The details of the Mohini story varies by the Purana and region, but she is consistently an enchantress avatar of the supreme in Vaishnavism. Aattam is a Malayalam language word, and means rhythmic motion or dance. Mohiniyattam thus connotes "a dance of an enchantress, a beautiful woman".

== History ==
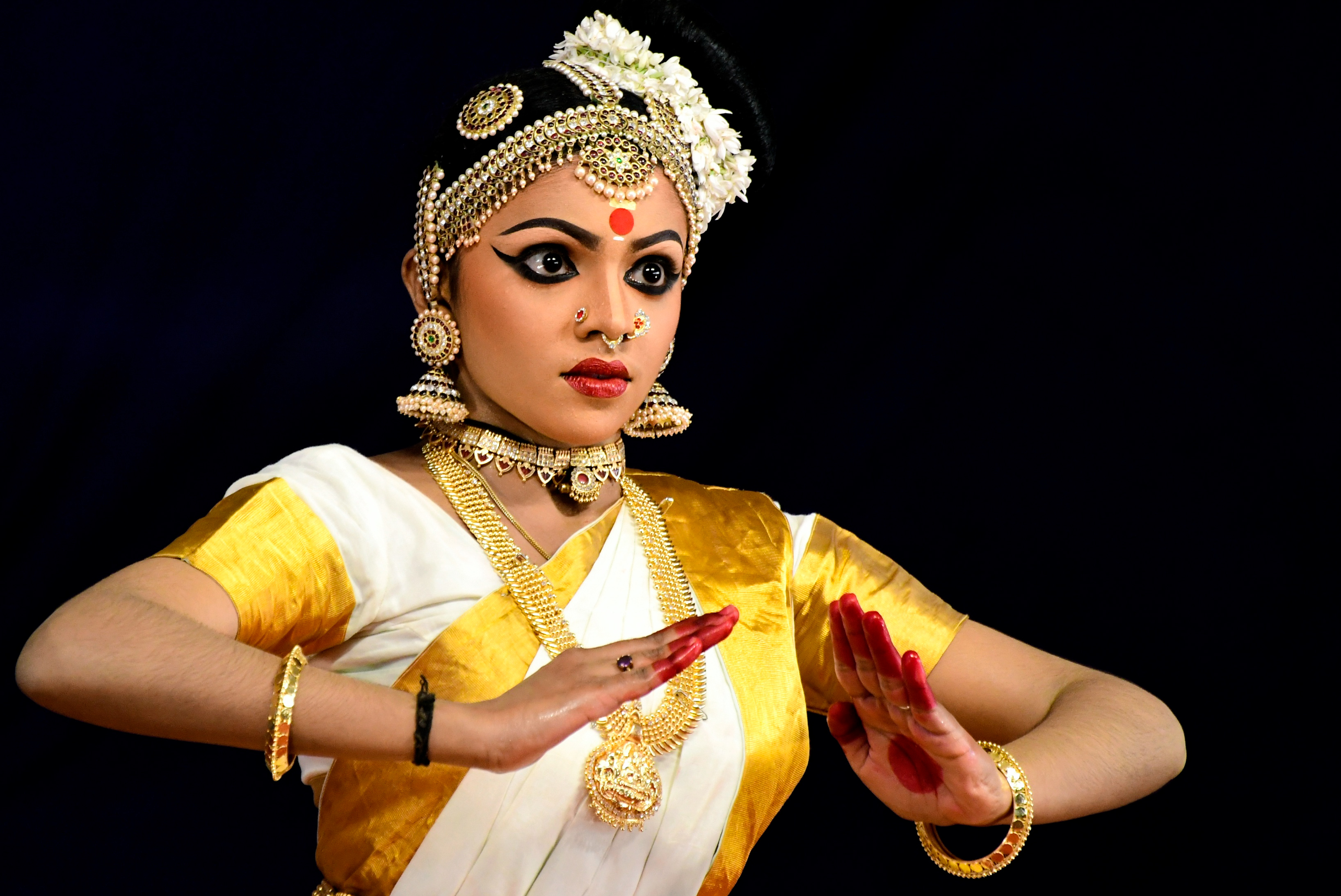
Mohiniyattam.

Mohiniyattam is a classical Indian dance, which by definition traces its repertoire to the foundational text Natya Shastra. The Natya Shastra text is attributed to the ancient scholar Bharata Muni. Its first complete compilation is dated to between 200 BCE and 200 CE, but estimates vary between 500 BCE and 500 CE. The text describes the basic elements and the structure of two types of dance: the vigorous, high energy Tāṇḍava dance (Shiva) and the gentle, calmingly graceful Lāsyā dance (Parvati, Shiva's lover). Mohiniyāttam follows the structure and aims of the Lāsyā dance in Natya Shastra.

According to Reginald Massey, Mohiniyattam's history is unclear. Kerala, the region where this dance genre developed and is popular, has a long tradition of lasya style dances whose basics and structure may be at the root. The earliest evidence of Mohiniyattam, or a Mohiniyattam-like dance tradition is found in temple sculpture of Kerala. The 11th century Vishnu temple at Trikodithanam, and the Kidangur Subramanya temple, have several sculptures of female dancers in Mohiniyattam pose. The textual evidence from 12th century onwards suggest that Malayalam poets and playwrights included Lāsyā themes. The 16th century Vyavaharamala by Nambootiri contains the first known mention of the term Mohiniyattam, in the context of a payment to be made to a Mohiniyattam dancer. Another text, Gosha Yatra, from the 17th century too mentions the term. The 18th century Balarama Bharatam, a major secondary work on Natya Shastra composed in Kerala, mentions many dance styles including Mohini Natana.

In the 18th and 19th century, Mohiniyattam grew as dance arts received patronage of competing princely states. In particular, the early 19th century sponsorship and building of a joint Mohiniyattam and Bharatanatyam team of artists by the Hindu king, poet and music composer Swathi Thirunal Rama Varma contributed to the growth and systematization of modern Mohiniyattam.

In the late 19th and early 20th century, Mohiniyattam was performed by women in the Hindu community, a community in central Kerala. According to Justine Lemos, Mohiniyattam "was a celebration of eroticism, fertility, wealth and hospitality".

=== Colonial era ===
With the spread of colonial British rule in the 19th century India, all classical dance forms of India were ridiculed and discouraged, leading to their severe decline. This was in part the result of the Victorian morality of sexual repressiveness along with Anglican missionaries who criticized Hinduism.

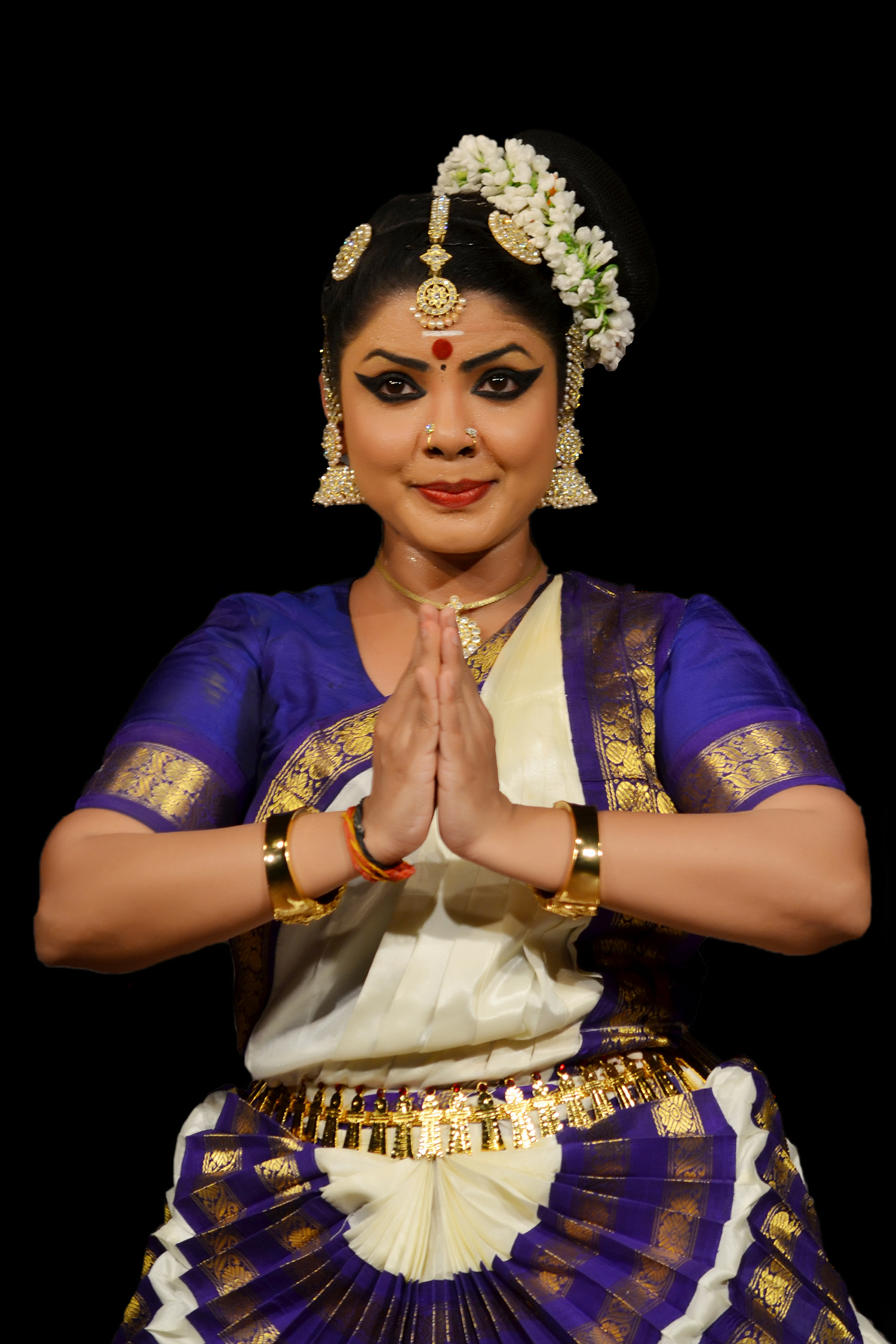
A Mohiniattam pose

The seductive gestures and facial expressions during temple dances were caricatured in The Wrongs of Indian Womanhood, published at the start of the 20th century, as evidence of "harlots, debased erotic culture, slavery to idols and priests" tradition, and Christian missionaries demanded that this must be stopped, launching the "anti-dance movement" or "anti-nautch movement" in 1892. This movement affected all classical dances in India and contributed to their decline, including the stigmatization of Mohiniyattam in the princely states of Travancore and Cochin in the British Empire.

According to Justine Lemos, the conventional stereotype has been to label the temple dancers as prostitutes and that Mohiniyattam was banned by the Maharaja under pressure from the British rule and his citizens, but an examination of historical evidence suggests that neither did any law or proclamation ban Mohiniyattam nor is there any evidence that dancing girls of Mohiniyattam were devadasis, temple prostitutes or even menial servants of the temple. However, adds Lemos, there is evidence of rewards being given, scholarship being sponsored, and payments being made to the dancers of Mohiniyattam, as well as laws enacted between 1931 and 1938 that – without naming Mohiniyattam – banned devadasis, banned all forms of "lewd dance or theatre", and banned dancing in temples while the princely states of Kerala were part of the British Empire, in a manner similar to bans on Hindu performance arts in Madras, Bombay and Calcutta Presidencies enacted earlier. In 1940, the ban was partially repealed, by allowing "voluntary dances in temples". In 1941, a new law clarified that voluntary dance was permitted, but the dancers should never be paid. This led to protests, public riots and demands by dancers that performance art is a form of economic activity and religious freedom, that Mohiniyattam artists should be paid by the state or the audience, but the state did not pay them.

Some women continued to dance Mohiniyattam in Hindu temples, regardless of the historic politics during the 1940s.

=== Modern era ===
The ridicule and bans enacted during the British colonial era contributed to nationalist sentiments, and impacted all Hindu performance arts including Mohiniyattam. It too was revived and reconstructed, particularly in the 1930s by the nationalist Malayalam poet Vallathol Narayana Menon, who helped repeal the ban on temple dancing in Kerala, as well as established the Kerala Kalamandalam dance school and encouraged Mohiniattam studies, training and practice.

Other significant champions of Mohiniyattam in the 20th century have been Mukundraja, Appiradeth Krishna Panicker, Harichand and guys from Vishnavam, Thankamony, as well as the guru and dancer Kalamandalam Kalyanikutty Amma.

Kalamandalam is a very known institution for teaching and learning the art form Mohiniyattam, but notorious for the discriminations faced by the artists and students based on their caste and colour. Additional to this, Kalamandalam Sathyabhama Jr entered the media scope recently with racist and gender slam statement against male and coloured artists earning their space in the art form gala of Mohiniyattam.

== Repertoire ==
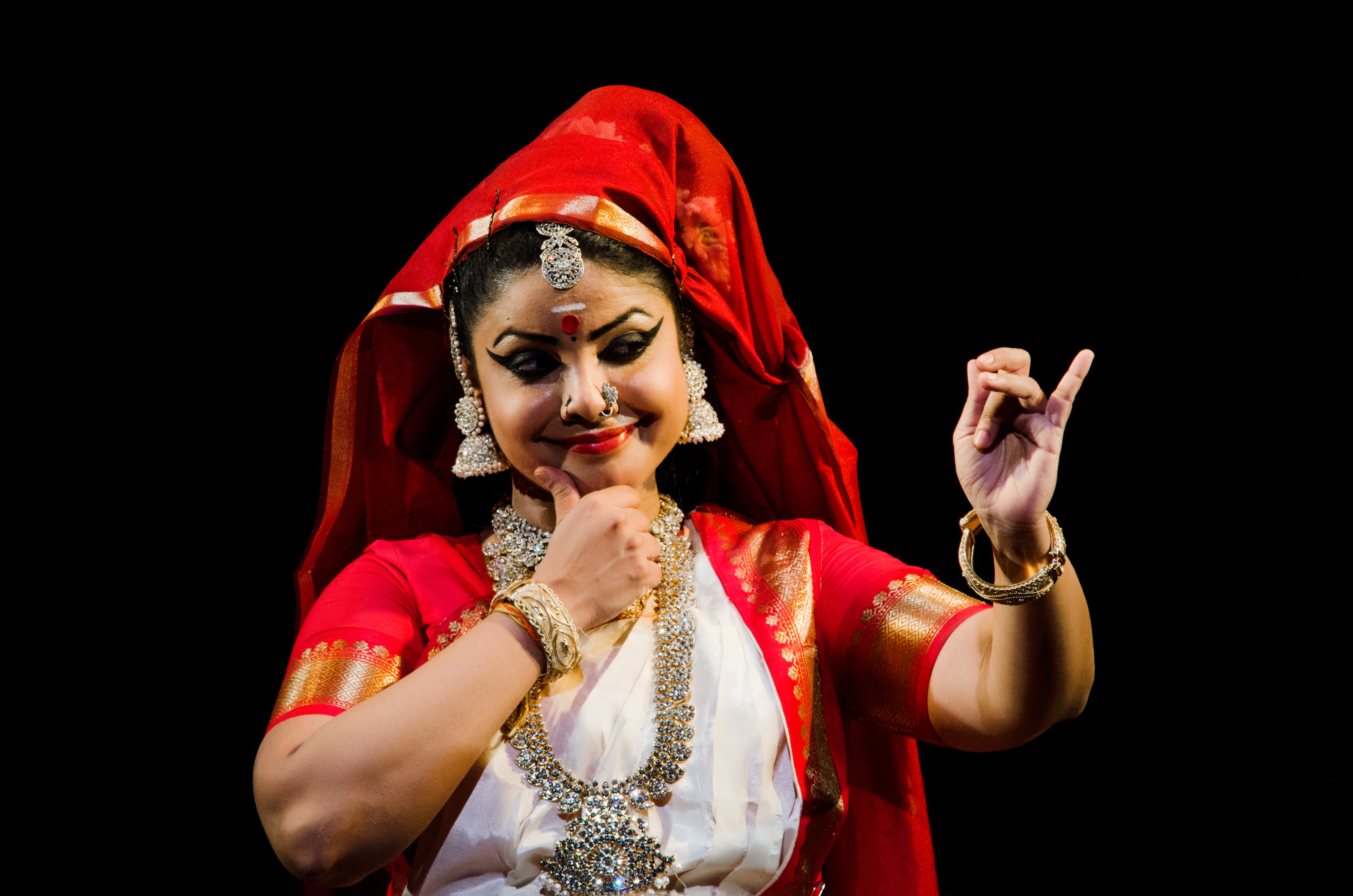
Expression of an artist

Mohiniyattam is a lasya subgenre of dance, performed in the Kaisiki vritti (graceful style), as discussed in ancient Indian performance arts texts such as the Natya Shastra. More specifically, it is a dance that excels in Ekaharya Abhinaya form, that is a solo expressive dance performance aided by singing and music. The dance includes nritta (pure dance, solo), nritya (expressive dance, solo) and modern productions sometimes include natya (play, group dance):

- The Nritta performance is abstract, rhythmic aspect of the dance that appears early and at the end of the dance repertoire. The viewer is presented with pure movement, wherein the emphasis is the beauty in motion, form, speed, range and pattern. This part of the repertoire has no interpretative aspect, no telling of story.
- The Nritya is the expressive aspect of the dance that attempts to communicate a storyline, with emotions and feelings, with spiritual themes. In a nritya, the dance-acting (Abhinaya, Vaittari) expands to include silent expression of words through hand and facial gestures and body motion set to musical notes. The dancer articulates a legend or a spiritual message, aiming to engage the emotions and mind of the viewer.

The basic posture of Mohiniyattam is parted feet, knees bent outwards, an erect upper torso, gentle 8-shape side to side swaying of body along with hips (Ati Bhanga). The footwork is soft, sliding and synchronous with the musical beat and acting. The body movement is sometimes described in terms of calming images of nature as the swinging of the palm leaves, and the gentle undulating of ocean waves.

The basic dance units in Mohiniattam are known as atavus or atavukal, and these are grouped into four: Taganam, Jaganam, Dhaganam and Sammisram. The hand and facial gestures of the dance follow the classical text of Hastha Lakshanadeepika, which has elaborate description of mudras.

=== Sequence ===
The repertoire sequence of Mohiniyattam is similar to that of Bharatanatyam, so it contains seven items that are performed to a structure described in classical dance texts: Cholkettu (invocation, but starts with offering reverence to a goddess Bhagavati and ends with a prayer to Shiva), Jatisvaram or more precisely Swarajeti, Varnam (a play wherein she embeds a mimicry for distraction while communicating the underlying story or message), Padam (song), Tillana (dancer's interpretation of melody the musician create), Shlokam and Saptam.

=== Costumes ===
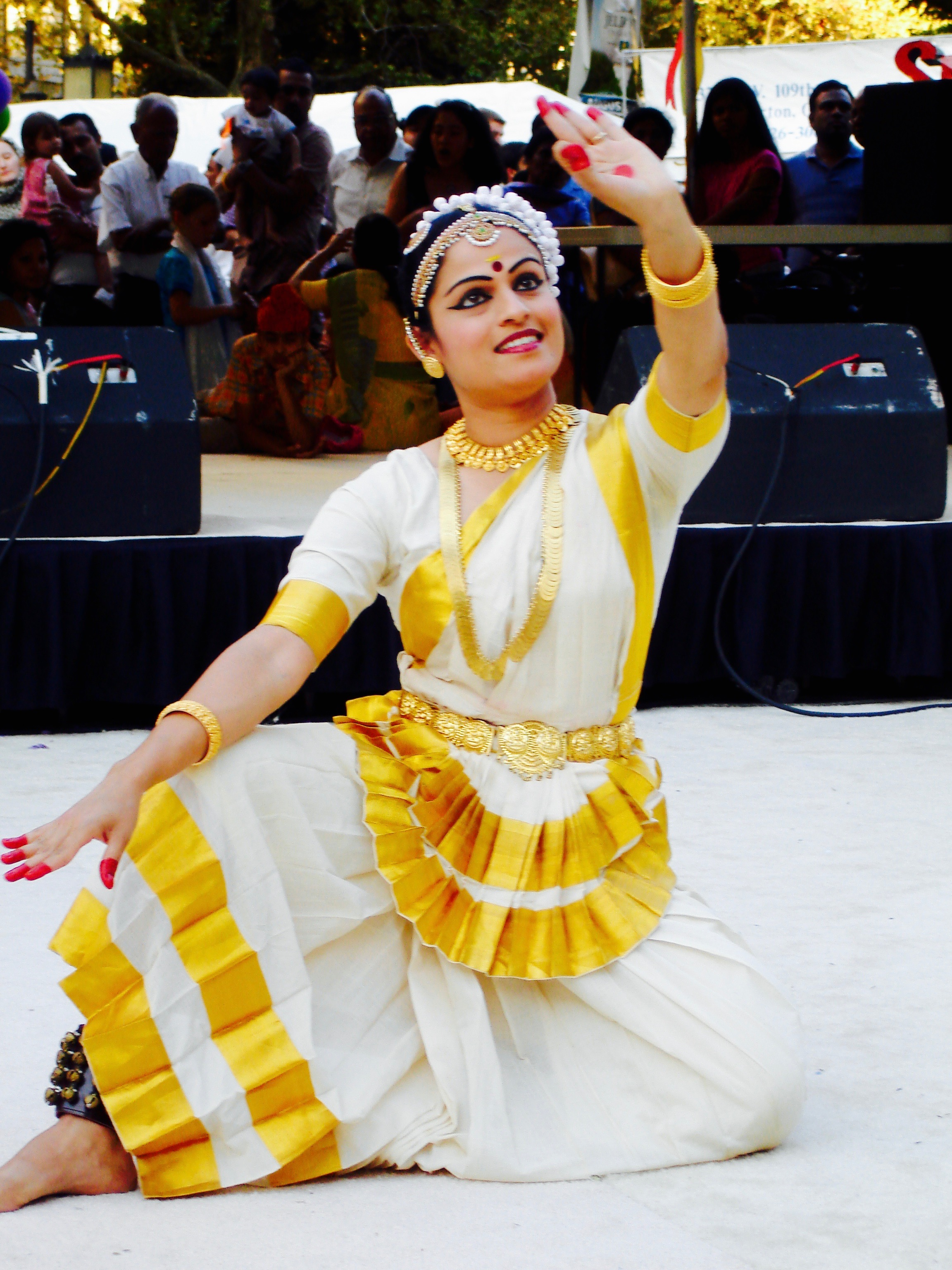
Mohiniyattam costumes.

The costume includes plain white or off-white such as ivory or cream colored sari embroidered with bright golden or gold laced colored brocade (similar to a ceremonial Kasavu saree). She wears a fitted choli (blouse) matching the sari, below which at the waist is a golden belt which tucks in the end of the sari, and highlights the waist. In front of the saree, below the belt is pleated sheet with concentric bands in gold or saffron colors, which allow freedom of movement and assist in visually communicating the mudra to distant audience.

The dancer wears relatively simple jewelry and no masks, in contrast to the other major classical dance of Kerala called Kathakali. Her jewelry typically includes items on fingers, wrists, neck and ears (which may have bells). The face makeup is natural, but lips are brilliant red, she has the Hindu tikka (Gobi) on her forehead and her eyes are lined to help prominently highlight the eye movements during the dance. Her ankles are adorned with leather straps with bells (chilanka), feet and fingers colored red with natural dyes. Her hairdo is gathered and tied into a smooth tight round chignon on one side of her head (typically left) and the bun then ringed with fragrant flowers (typically jasmine mulla).

For male dancers, they typically wear a dhoti (called the muti). Like women, his ankles are also adorned with chilankas, feet and fingers colored red with natural dyes. Like women, he also has the Hindu tikka (Gobi) on his forehead and his eyes are lined.

=== Music and instruments ===
The vocals (music) of Mohiniyattam involves various rhythms. There are numerous compositions for a Mohiniyattam repertoire, most of whose lyrics are in Manipravalam, a mixture of Sanskrit, Tamil and Malayalam.

The musical instruments usually used in Mohiniyattam are Mridangam or Madhalam (barrel drum), Idakka (hour glass drum), flute, Veena, and Kuzhitalam (cymbals). The ragas (melody) are rendered in the sopana (steps) style, which is a slow melodic style with roots in the Natya Shastra.

== Gallery ==
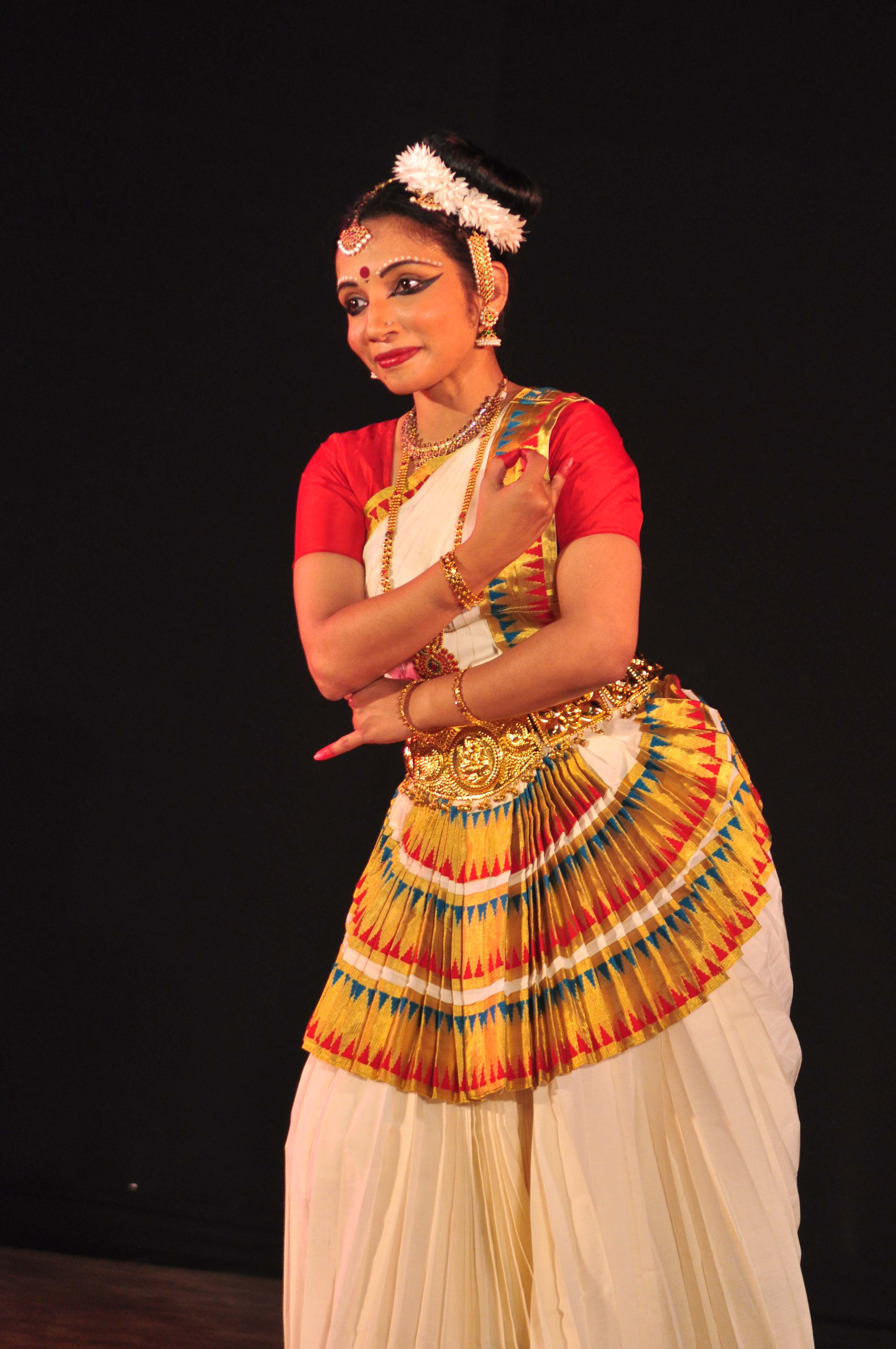
gouri festival palakkad

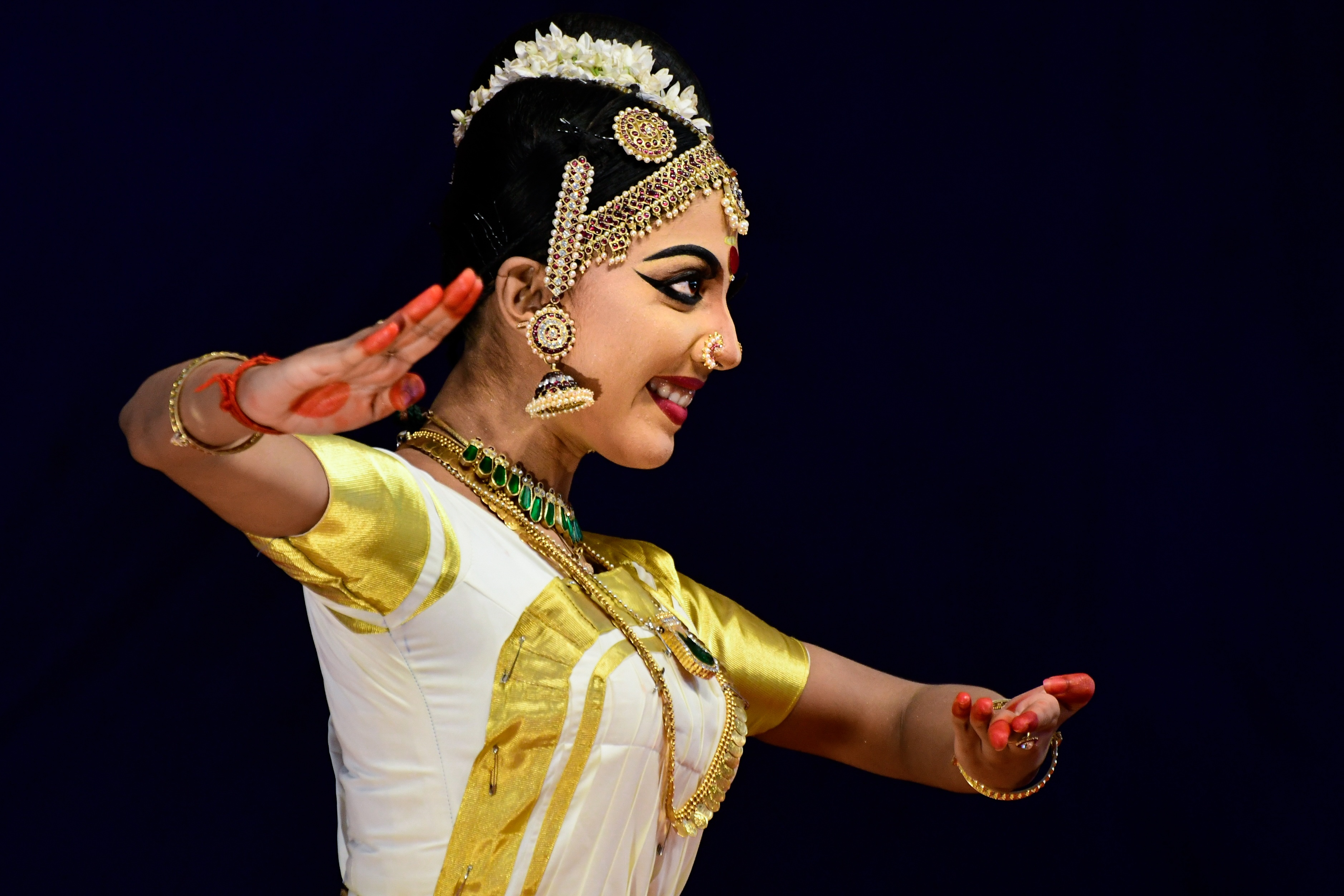
At Kerala School Kalolsavam, 2019

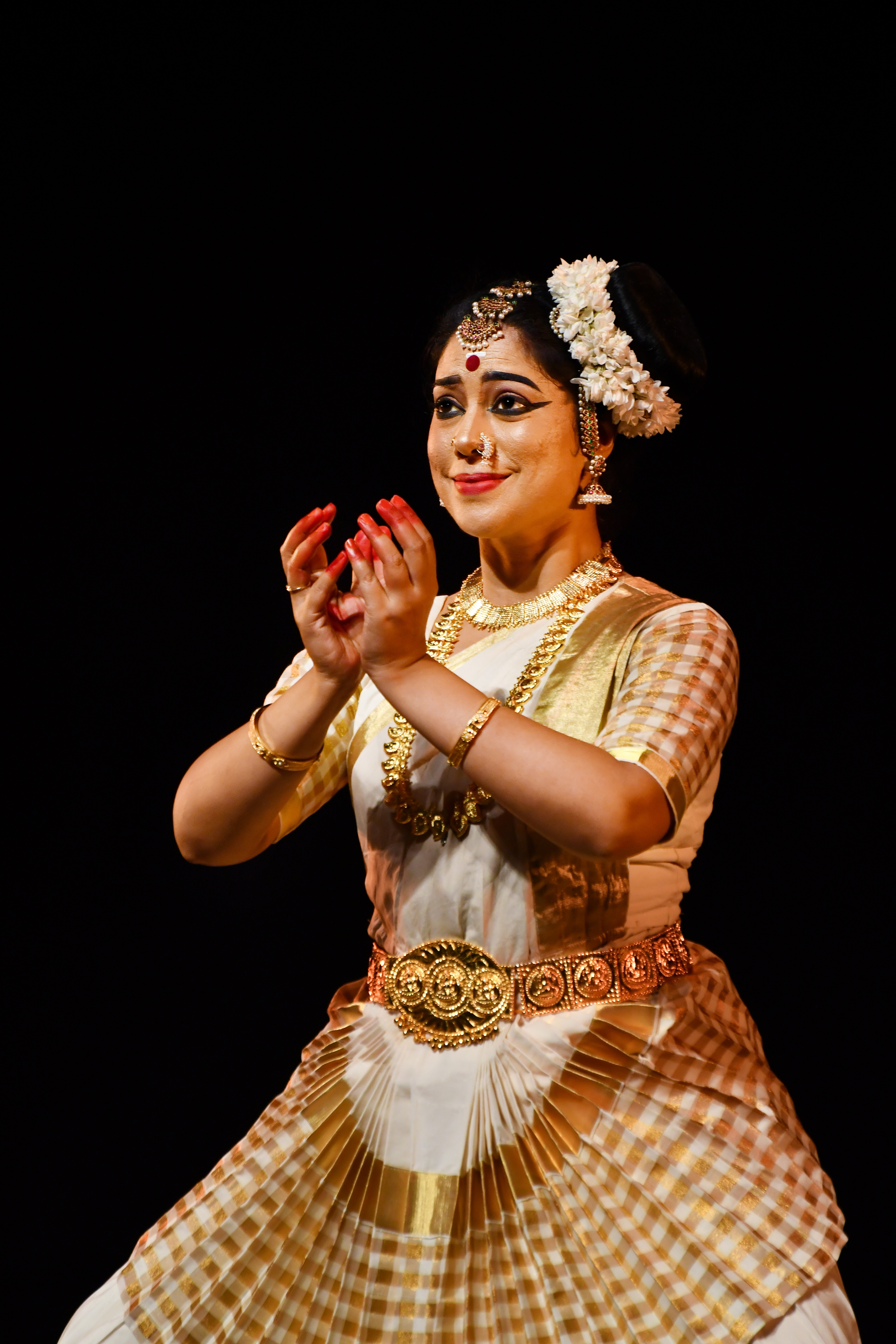

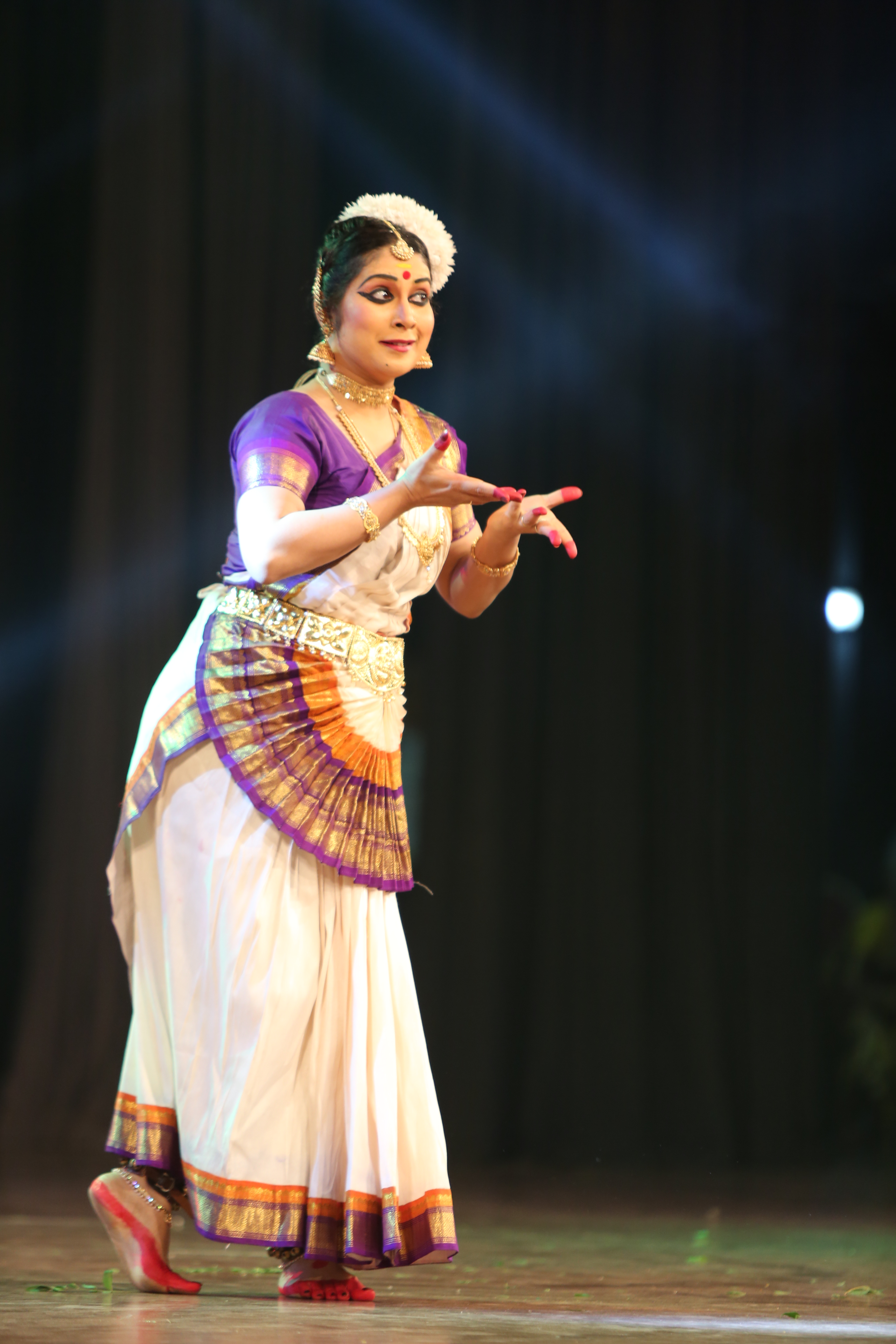
:Mohiniyattam Performance in Kerala Bhavan's Laying the Foundation Stone Event
