= Pushpavanam =

- village
- Location in Tamil Nadu, India Pushpavanam (India)
- Coordinates: 10°27′33″N 79°50′54″E
- Country: India
- State: Tamil Nadu
- District: Nagapattinam

Area
  - Total: 10 km^{2} (3.9 sq mi)

Population (2011)
  - Total: 6,705
  - Density: 670/km^{2} (1,700/sq mi)

Languages
  - Official: Tamil
- Time zone: UTC+5:30 (IST)
- PIN: 614809
- Telephone code: 04369
- Sex ratio: 0.97 ♂/♀

Pushpavanam is a village in Vedaranyam subdistrict in Nagapattinam District in the Indian state of Tamil Nadu.

== Geography ==
Pushpavanam is seashore village 10.3 km north of Vedaranyam taluk in Nagapattinam District, Tamil Nadu State in India. It is 34.8 km south of Nagapattinam and 291 km from Chennai. It is located on the Bay of Bengal. With the Vedaranyam Canel (Uppanar River) to the southwest and the Vettar River to the north, Pushpavanam is effectively on an island.

Pushpavanam shares its postal pincode (614809) with other villages such as Thethakudi, Periyakuthagai, Sembodai, Kallimedu, and Thamaraipulam.

== Etymology ==
In sanskrit, "pushpam" means flower, and "vanam" means forest. It is thought to derive its name from people taking flowers to the village from Vedaranyeswarar temple during puja. Another thought is that in the Mahābhārata, Draupadi took flowers to this village.

== Economy ==
Agricultural crops include coconut, mango, cashew nut, rice, peanuts, and Gloriosa superba, known locally as kalappai kizhangu, kaarthigai kizhangu, or kanvali kizhangu, or sengaanthal. Fishing is a common profession.

== Education ==
Pushpavanam is served by several State Board Schools, including:

- Aided Middle School
- Govt. Higher Secondary School
- Guru Dhakshinamoorthy Primary School
- Vinayaga Primary School
- Panchayat Union School, Pattinatheru
- Panchayat Union School, Kothankadu

== History ==
The village is about a 1000 years old.

== Demographics ==
As of 2011 census, it had a population of 6,705 in 1,799 households. There are active Hindu, Islamic and Christian communities.
