= Katharipuram =

Katharipulam is a village in south India, under the administration of the Vedaranyam taluk, and located in the Nagapattinam District in the state of Tamil Nadu. The local language is Tamil. The village population is about 7292, and the village occupies an area of around 25 km^{2} (10 sq mi). It is about 10 km (6 mi) north west of Vedaranyam and about 35 km (22 mi) south of Velankanni Town, a famous Christian holy place. The postal index number (PIN) is 614808.

According to the 2011 census it has a population of 7292 living in 2113 households. The main agricultural product is coconut growing.

== Etymology ==
Originally called "Saptha Rishi Pulam", the name of the village has evolved into Katharipulam over time. "Saptha" means seven, "Rishi" denotes Hindu saints, "Pulam" in Tamil means "living place", thus "Saptharishipulam" means "living place of seven saints", the original name. The current name is composed of the parts "kathari" brinjal - a vegetable widely cultivated around these area and "pulam".

== Climate ==
The maximum temperature is around 40 degrees Celsius, occurring in the months of May and June. The minimum temperature is approximately 20 degrees, occurring in December and January. There are moderate to heavy rains during the north-east monsoon season, which starts from mid-September, running to mid-January.

== Flora and fauna ==
Mango, cashew, conifers (planted for firewood), palms, coconut trees, tamarind trees and foliage cover the land. There are a number of nearby attractions: a beach in Vedaranyam, and Kodikkarai (Point Calimere) is reputed as a bird sanctuary. Its small mangrove forest area is home to deer and other animals. During winter season, migrating birds, including flamingoes, from Russia and New Zealand can be seen.

== Education ==
Katharipulam has a higher secondary school and Aided Middle School.
