= Kilvelur taluk =

Kilvelur
- Taluk
- Kilvelur
- Location in Tamil Nadu, India
- Coordinates: 10.764°N 79.74°E
- Country: India
- State: Tamil Nadu
- District: Nagapattinam

Government
  - MLA: U. Mathivanan

Area
  - Total: 269.89 km^{2} (104.21 sq mi)
- Elevation: 8 m (26 ft)

Population (2011)
  - Total: 137,791
  - Density: 510.55/km^{2} (1,322.3/sq mi)

Languages
  - Official: Tamil
- Time zone: UTC+5:30 (IST)
- PIN: 611104
- Area code: 91 4366
- Vehicle registration: TN-51
- Sex ratio: 1027 ♂/♀

Kilvelur taluk is a taluk of Nagapattinam district of the Indian state of Tamil Nadu. The headquarters of the taluk is the town of Kilvelur.

== Population ==
According to the 2011 census, the taluk of Kilvelur had a population of 137,791 with 67,901 males and 69,890 females. There are 36,871 houses in the sub-district.

== Demographics ==
The taluk had a literacy rate of 76.11. Child population in the age group below 6 was 6,717 Males and 6,497 Females.

Kilvelur is a Taluk in the Nagapattinam District of Tamil Nadu. According to Census 2011 information the sub-district code of Kilvelur block is 05800. Total area of Kilvelur is 279 km^{2} including 269.89 km^{2} rural area and 9.50 km^{2} urban area. There are about 51 villages in Kilvelur block

== Sex ratio ==
In Kilvelur taluk, the female sex ratio is 1058 against state average of 996. Moreover, child sex ratio in Kilvelur is around 938 compared to Tamil Nadu state average of 943. The literacy rate of Kilvelur city is 89.82%, higher than the state average of 80.09%. In Kilvelur, male literacy is around 94.33% while female literacy rate is 85.60%.
