= Thanjavur Chariot festival =

Annual festival at Thanjavur, Tamil Nadu, India

The decorated chariot of the Big Temple

Thanjavur Chariot festival (தஞ்சாவூர் தேர்த்திருவிழா) is a historical event associated with the Big Temple, Thanjavur, Tamil Nadu, India.

== Background ==
In 2015, the chariot festival was held in the Big Temple, after a gap of more than one hundred years. Since then every year the festival is held in Thanjavur. During the 18th and 19th centuries festival was held. According to a document in 1776 C.E., 20,200 pulled the chariot during the festival in Thanjavur. Serfoji during the chariot festival held 1813 C.E., have brought out 27,394 persons from various taluks such as Thiruvaiyaru (1900), Papanasam (2800), Kumbakonam (3494), Mayuram (3484), Thiruvarur (2920), Mannargudi (4200), Kilvelur (4500), Nannilam (3200), including 900 persons from Thiruvaiyaru for carrying out the vahanas for the festival. In 1801 C.E. the king has donated 500 chakras for renewing the wheels of the chariot. As per the Modi document, 150 chakras was spent, as expenses, for pulling the chariot in 1801 C.E. and 1811 C.E. He set up five big chariots and also built four parking places in four main streets of Thanjavur.

== Specialities ==
The chariot was constructed by more than 30 artisans and sculptors, with 25 tonnes of Iluppai and teakwood. It consisted of three tiers, atop with throne. On the throne, known as simhasana the processional deity was kept. Based on the agamas, the sculptures for the chariot was made of iluppai tree. In the first stage, up to one and half a feet, 40 sculptures were set up. In the second stage up to two and quarter feet, 56 sculptures were set up. After completion of two stages, the final stage took place and trial run was held. It had 360 wooden sculptures including the sculptures of Periyanayaki, the consort of Shiva, Vinayaka, Subramania, Dvarapala, Boomadevi, Agasthiar, Sarabamurti, Gnanasambandar, Appar, Sundarar, Manikkavacakar, Veerabadrar, Bhikshatanar, Rishabarudar, Ekabathamoorthy. On four side of the chariot horses and yalis were found. In the front side of the chariot the Kailash, the abode of Siva and in the rear side Nandhi Mandapa and the Vimana of the Big Temple is sculpted in the same size. It had a height of 16 and half feet and 13 and half feet breadth.

== Trial run ==
After construction of the chariot with the setting up of sculptures in it, the trial run chariot festival was held on 20 April 2015. Before the trial run at 6.30 a.m. special pujas were done to the throne where the processional deity was to be kept. More devotees pulled the chariot.

== Chariot festival ==
On the previous day of the festival, on 28 April 2015, from the Nataraja shrine of the Big Temple procession took place to the accompaniment of melas and nadasvarams. On the festival day, on 29 April 2015 the chariot started. At 5.15 a.m. Panchamurtis, the five processional deities such as Vinayaka, Subramania, Thyagaraja with consort, Devi and Chandikesvarar came from the temple premises through Sivagangai Park and reached where the chariot was kept. At 6.15 a.m. all the deities were kept in their respective places. After the conduct of special pujas, thousands of devotees pulled the chariot. Followed by caparisoned elephant the chariots moved. To the front of the main chariot of the presiding deity Thyagaraja and Kamalambal, the small chariots of Vinayaka and Subramania went. Amman chariot and Chandikesvara chariot followed the main chariot. Folk dancers of Thappattam, Kolattam, Mayil Attam and Silambattam and Oduvars singing Devaram accompanied the chariot. In many places the chariots were stopped for the easier view and worship of the devotees and conduct of pujas and cracking of coconuts. Every year this festival is being held.

== Trial run/2015 ==
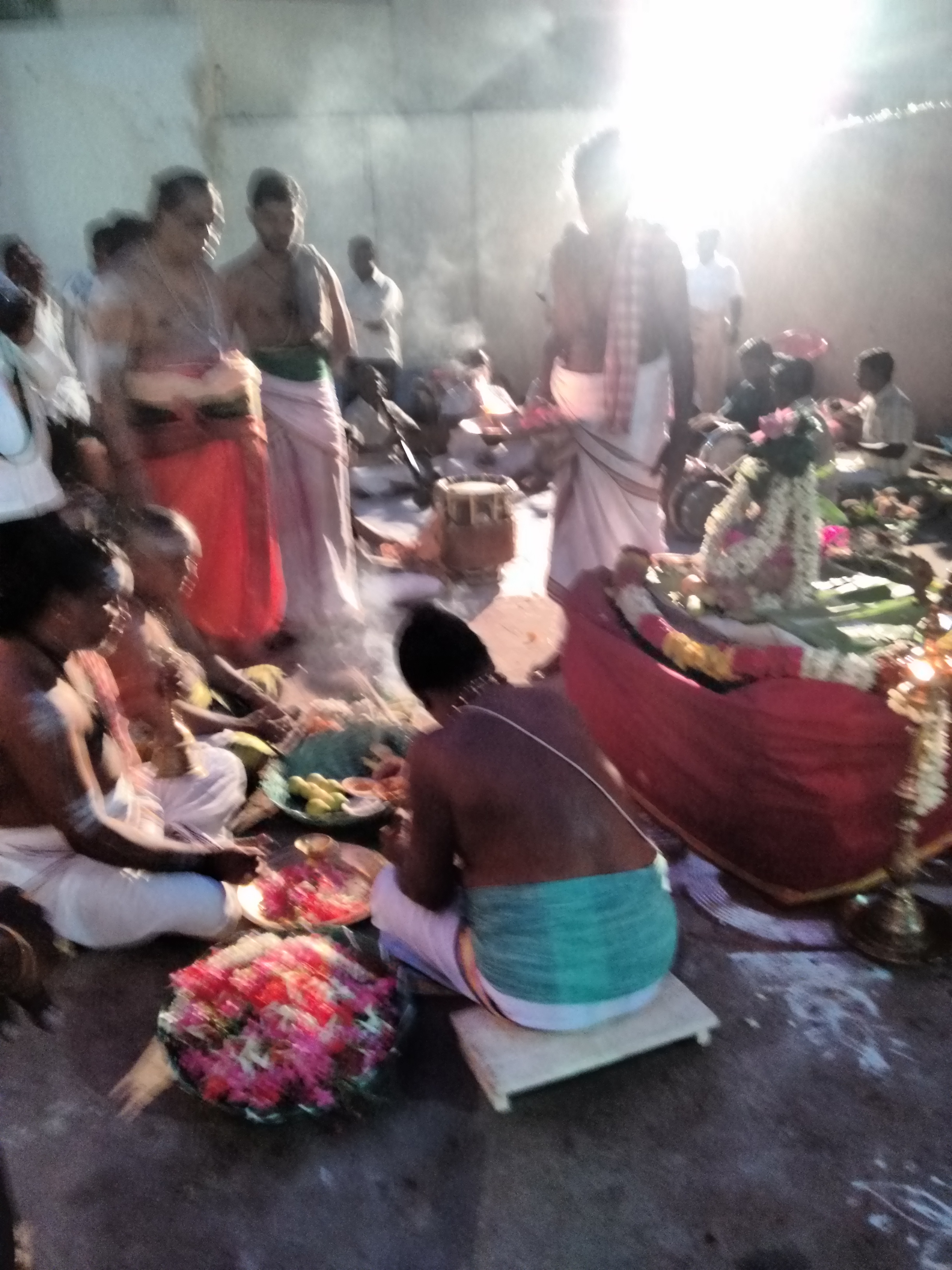
puja before leaving

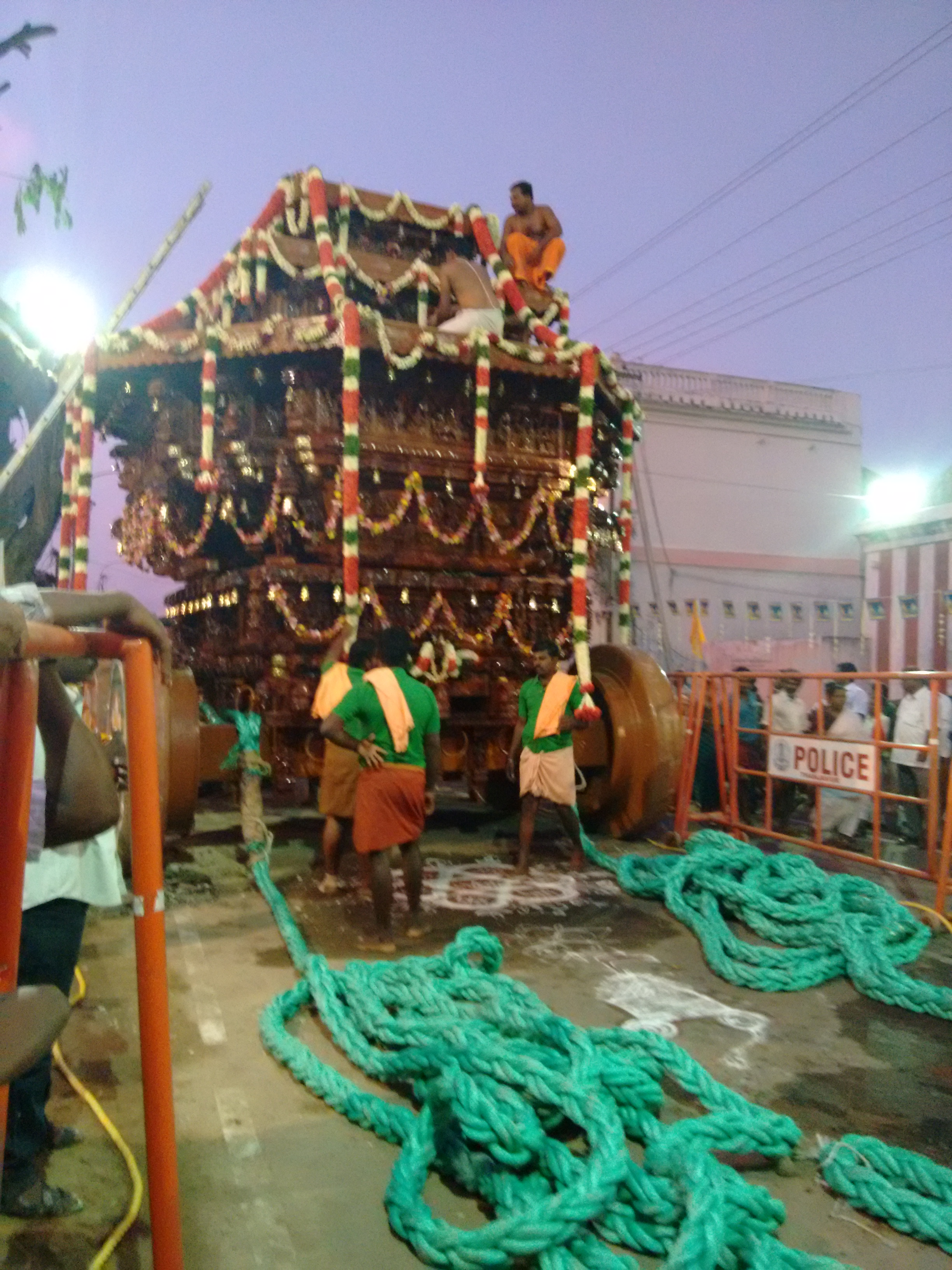
Arrangement for trial

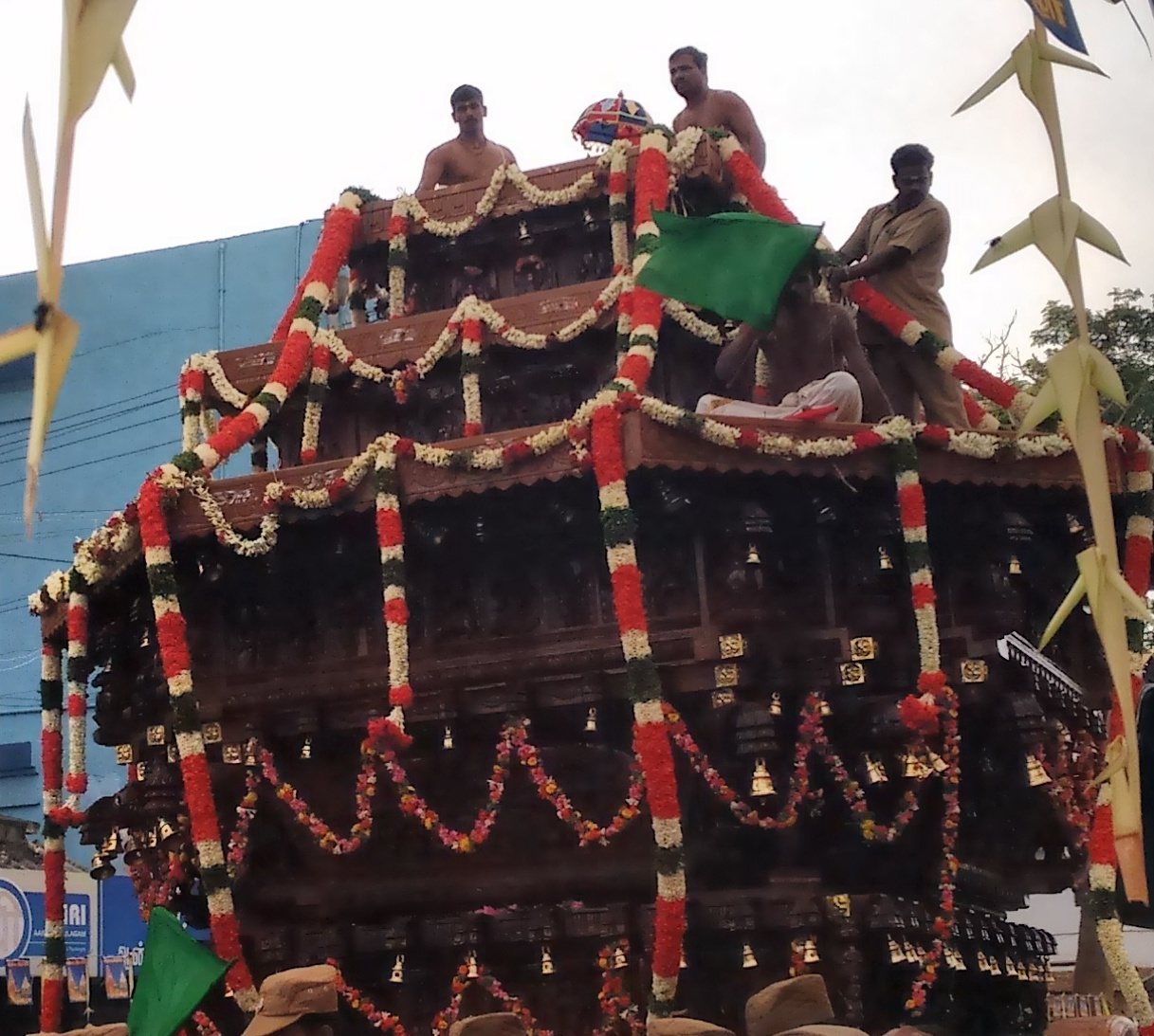
Ready for leaving

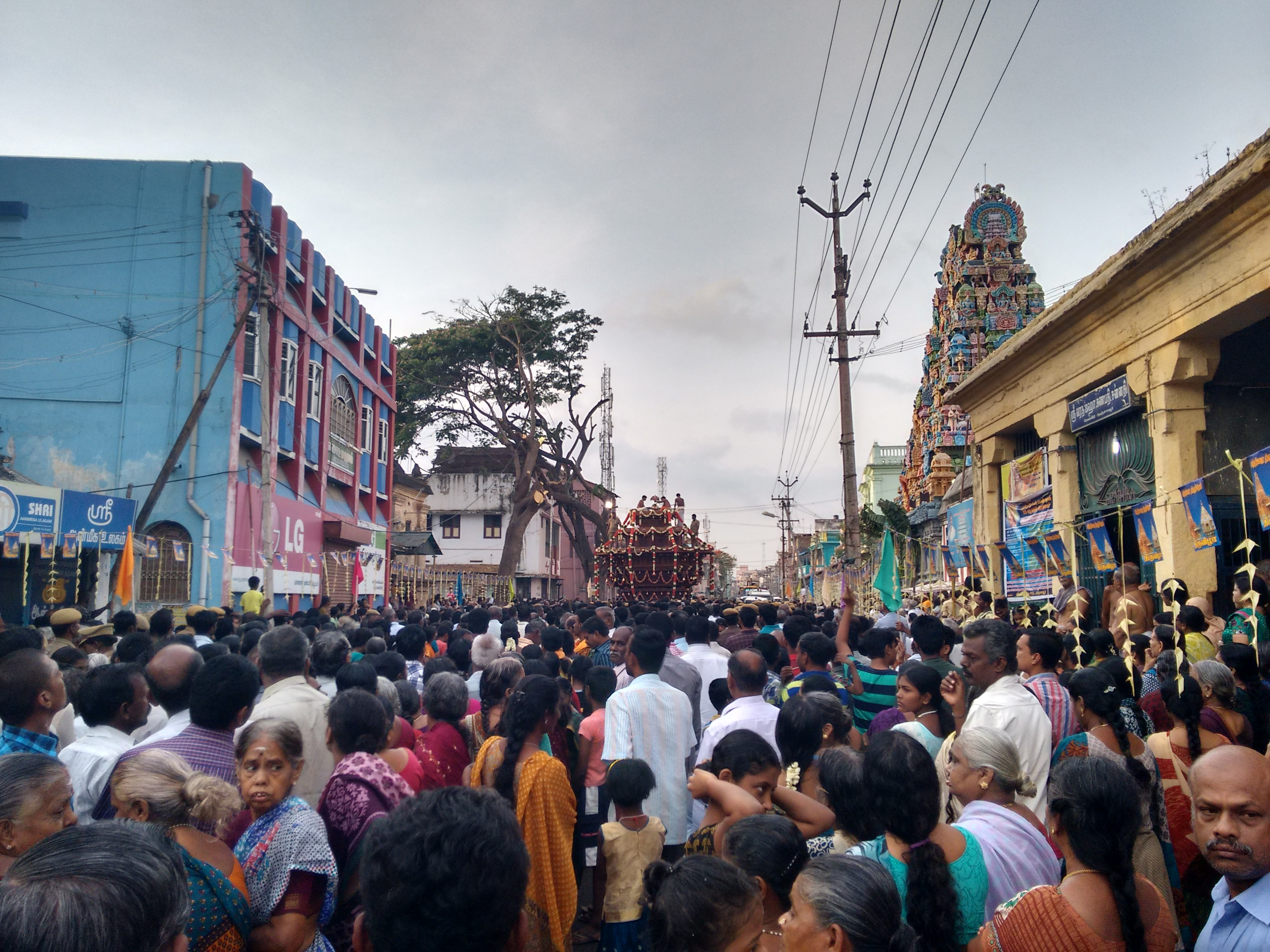
In the Wast Street

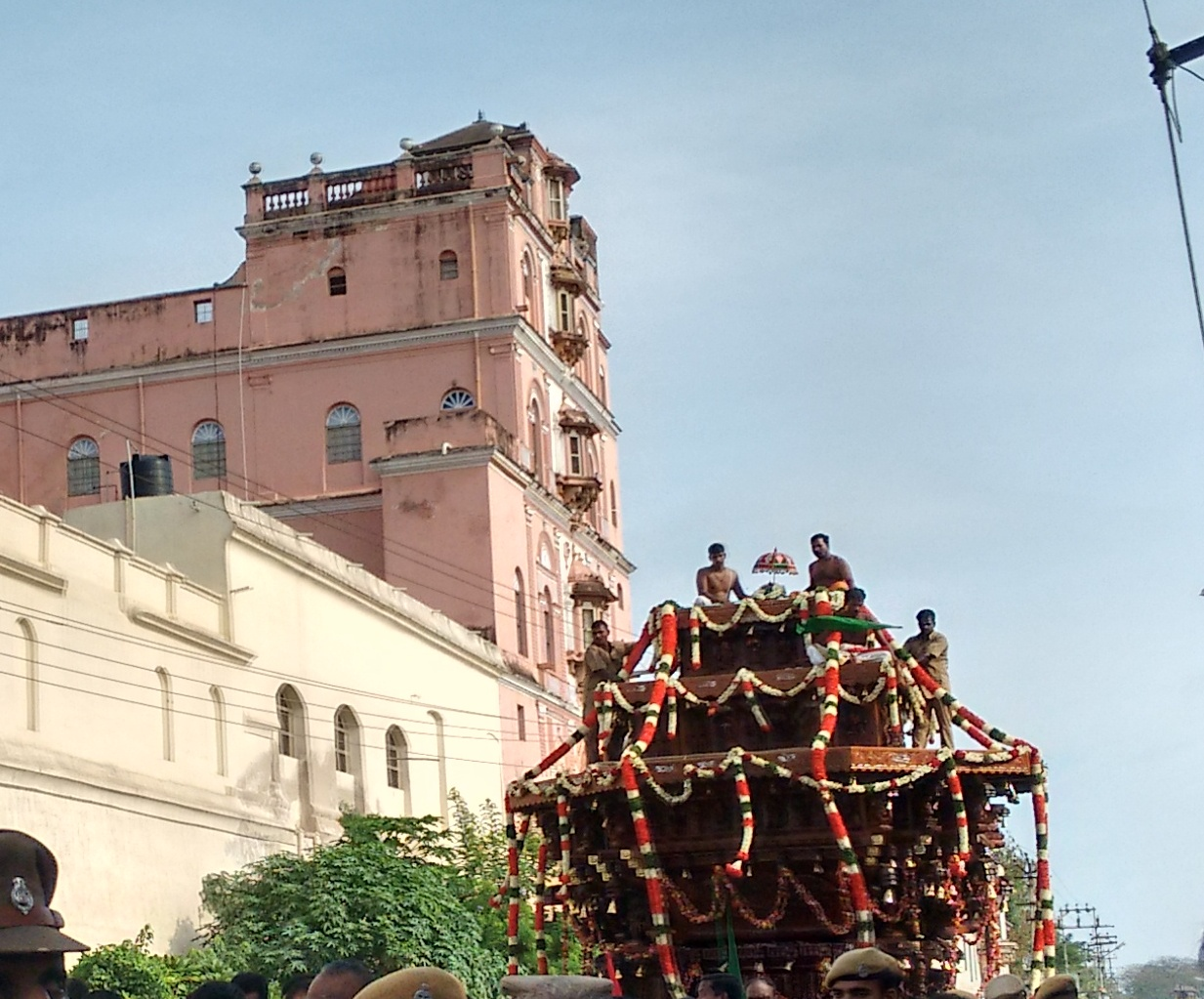
In the East Street

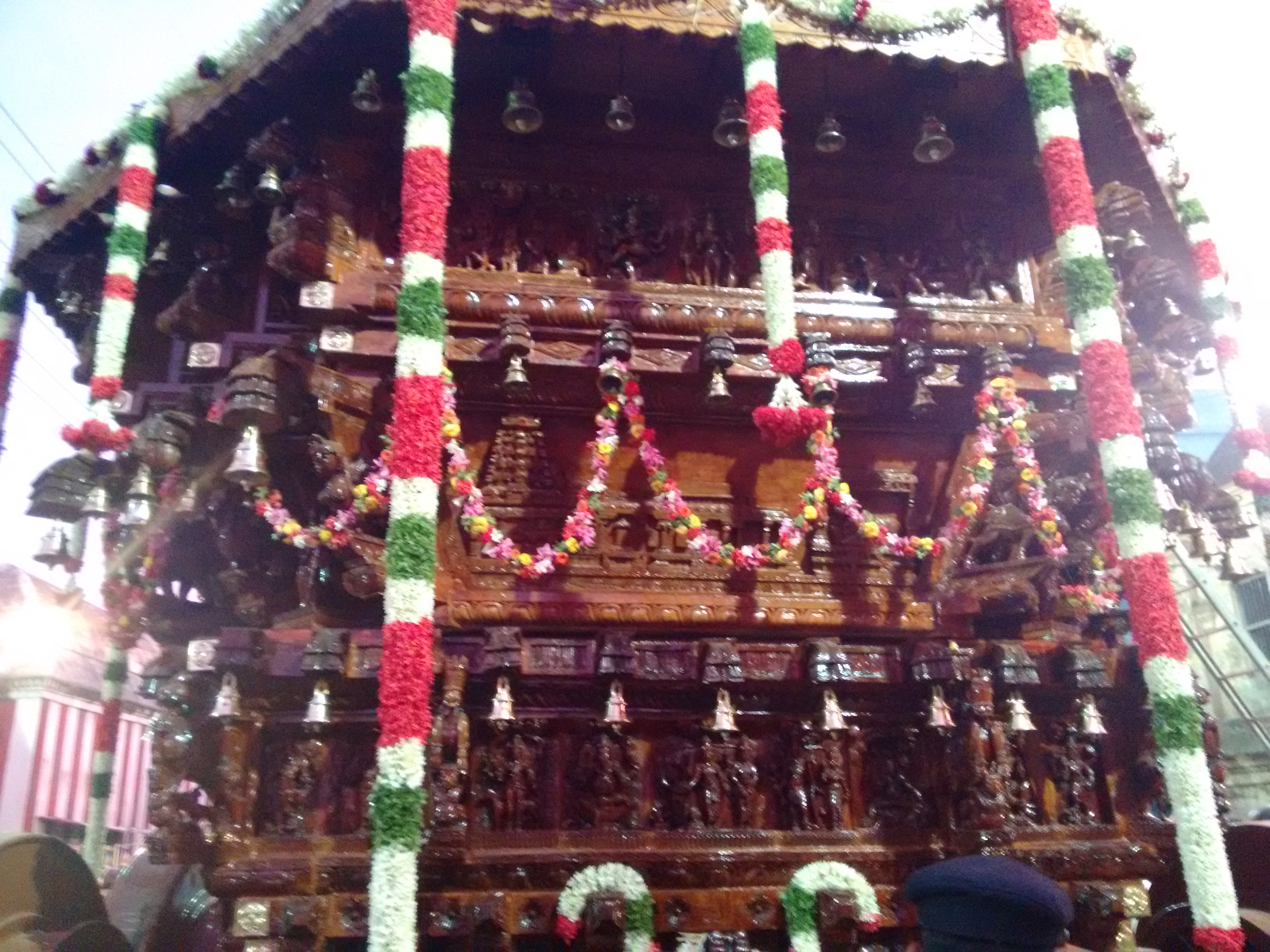
Big Temple sculpture in chariot

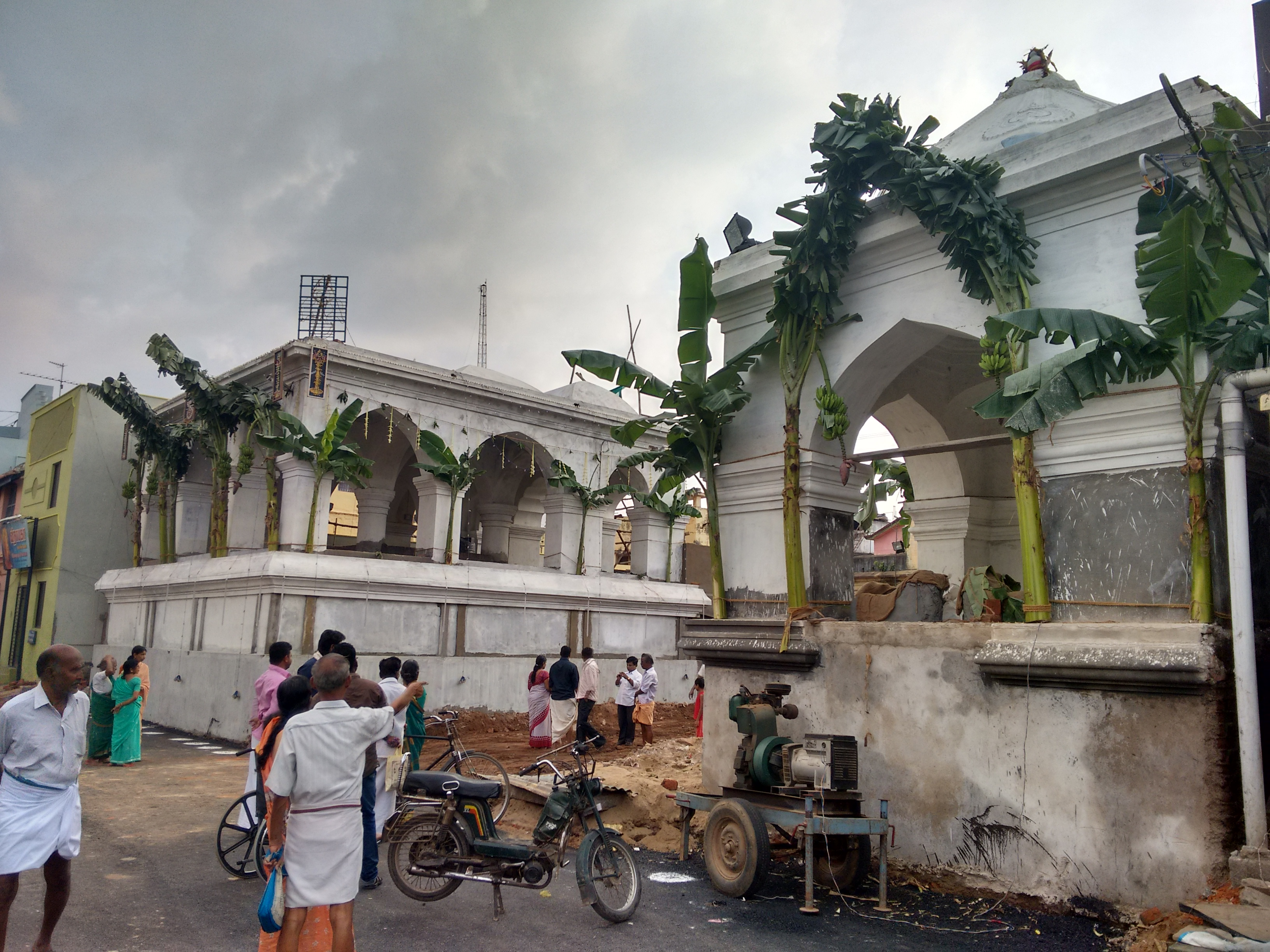
Parking place

== Festival/2015 ==
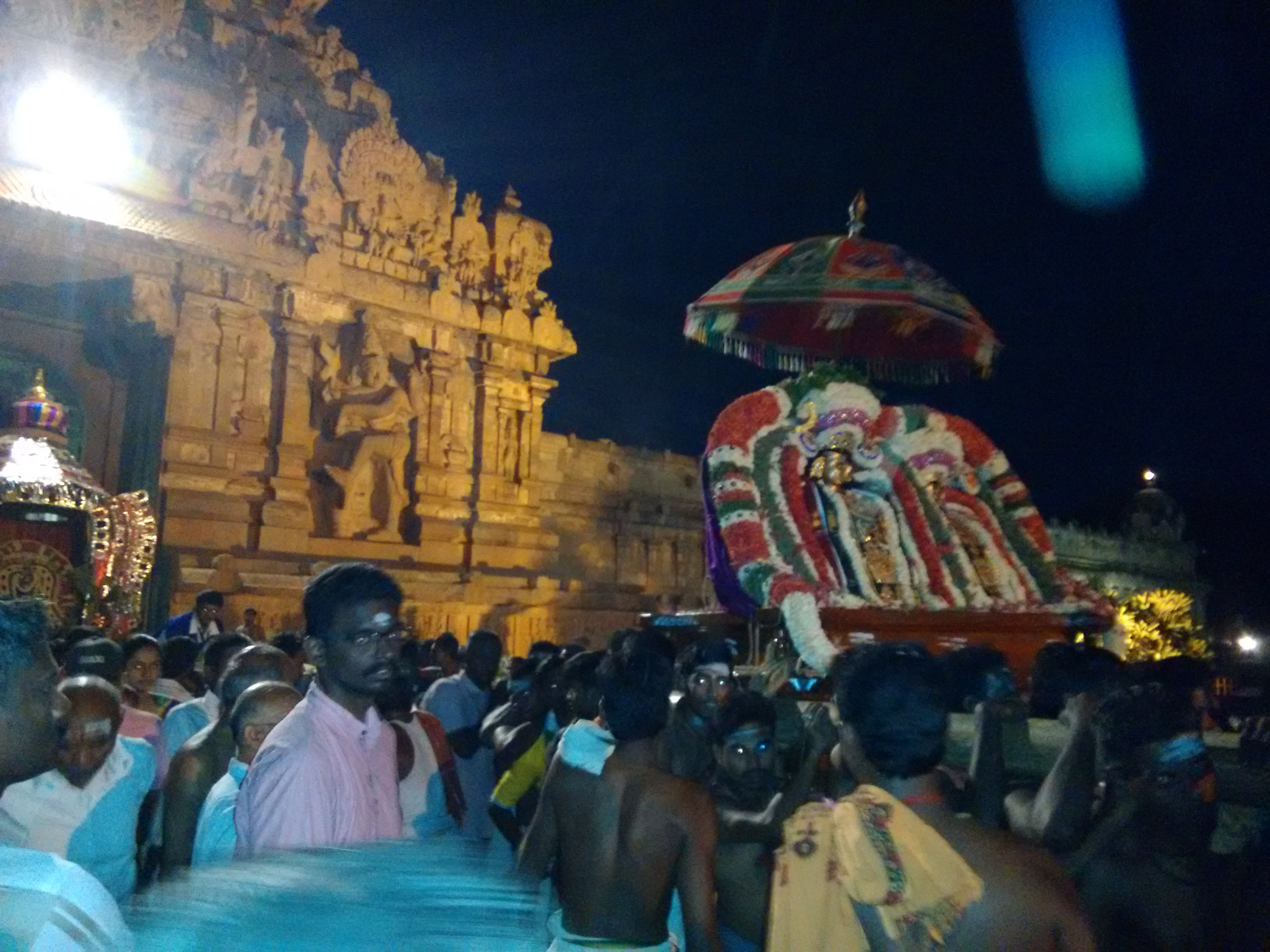
Presiding deity and Devi

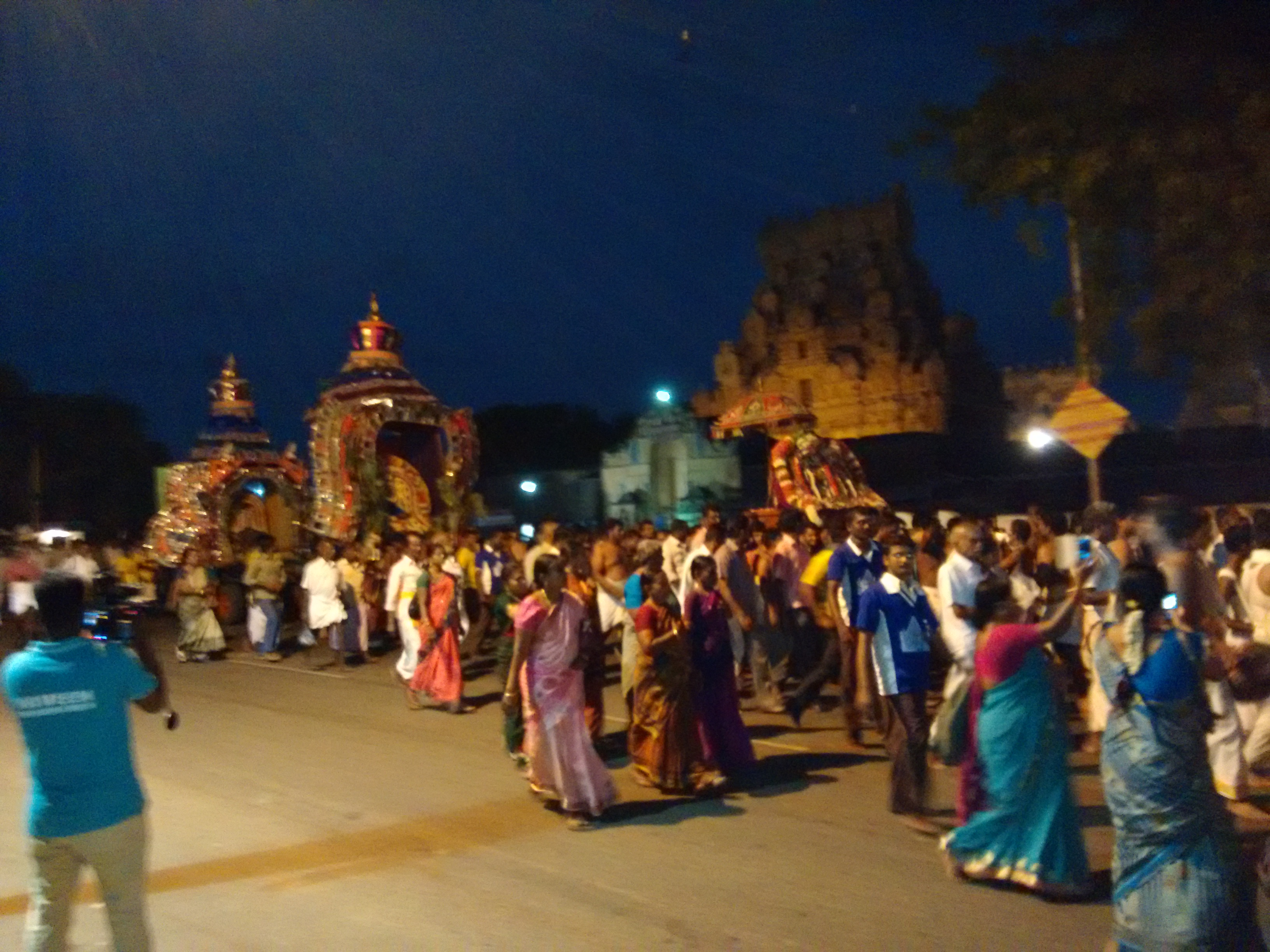
Panchamurti

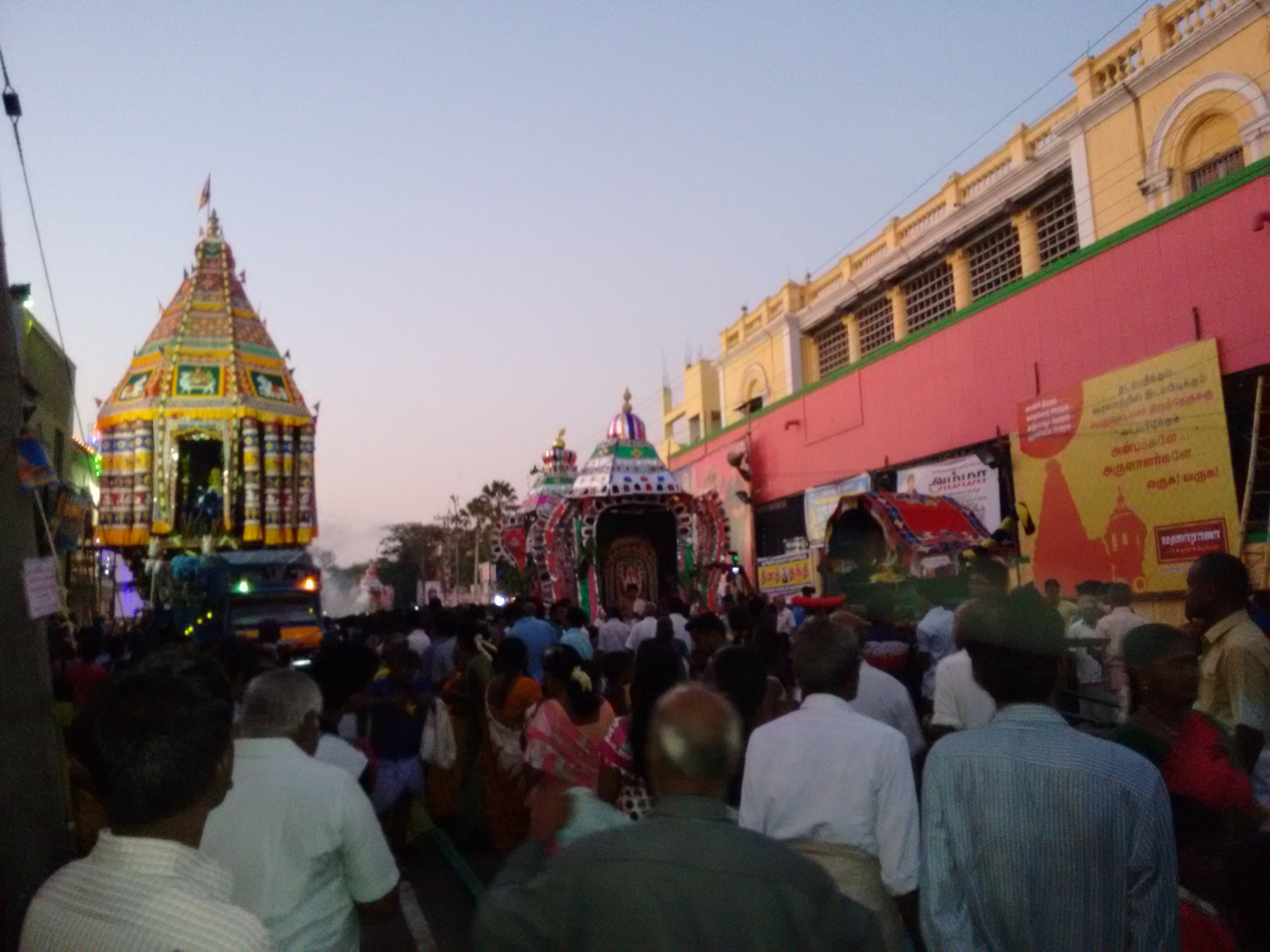
Vinayaka and Subramania leaving

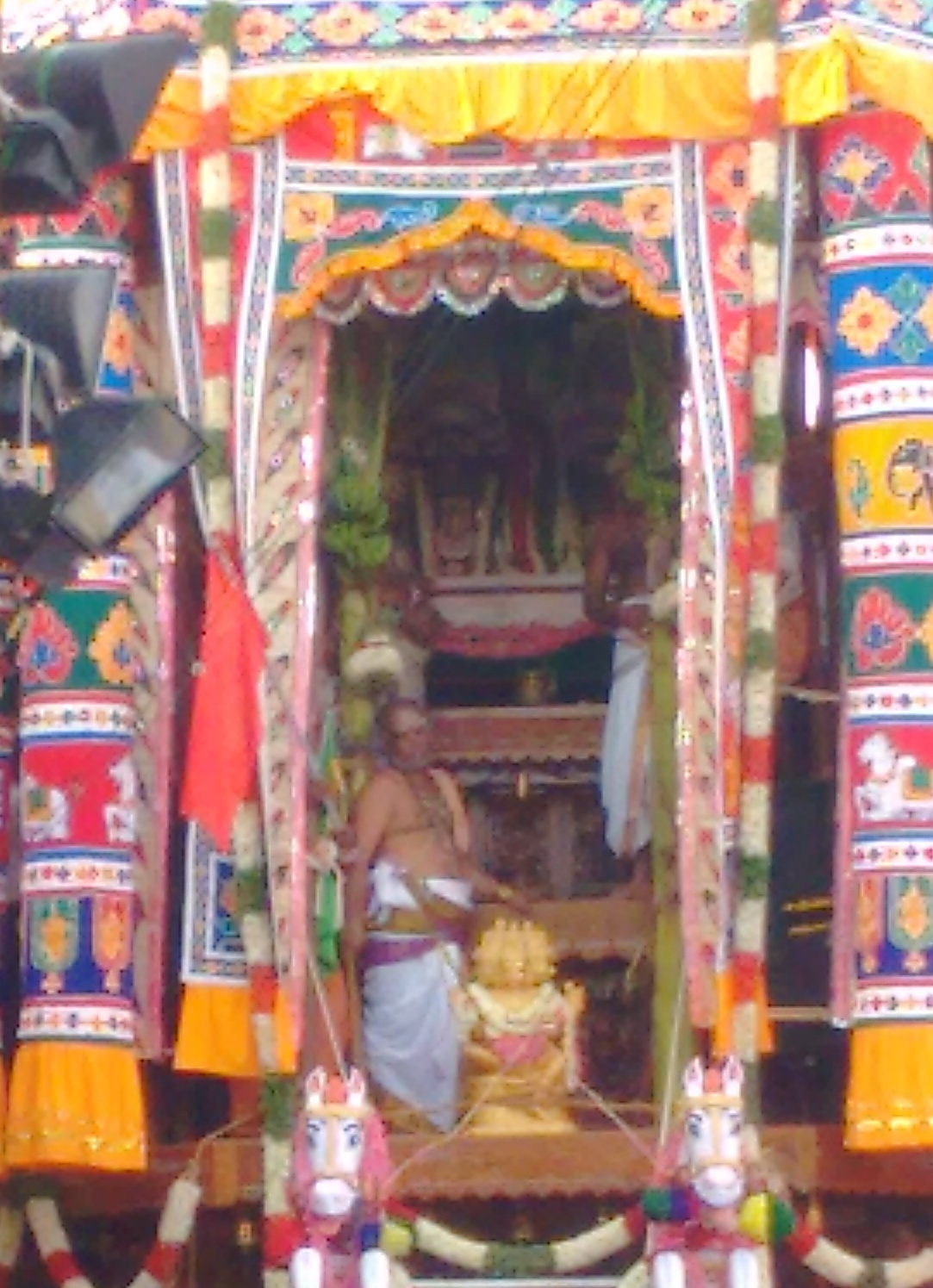
Presiding deity and consort in chariot

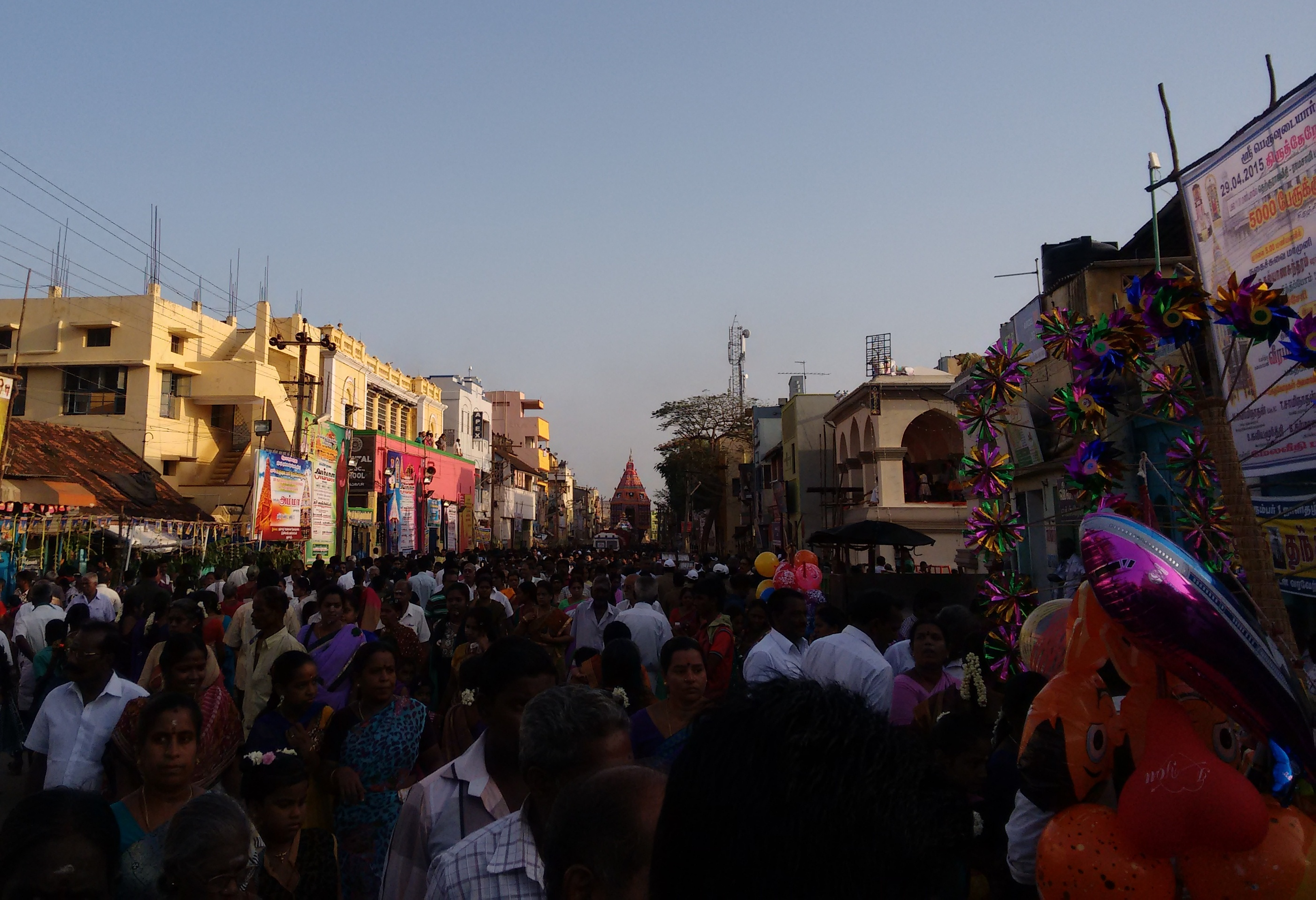
In the West Street

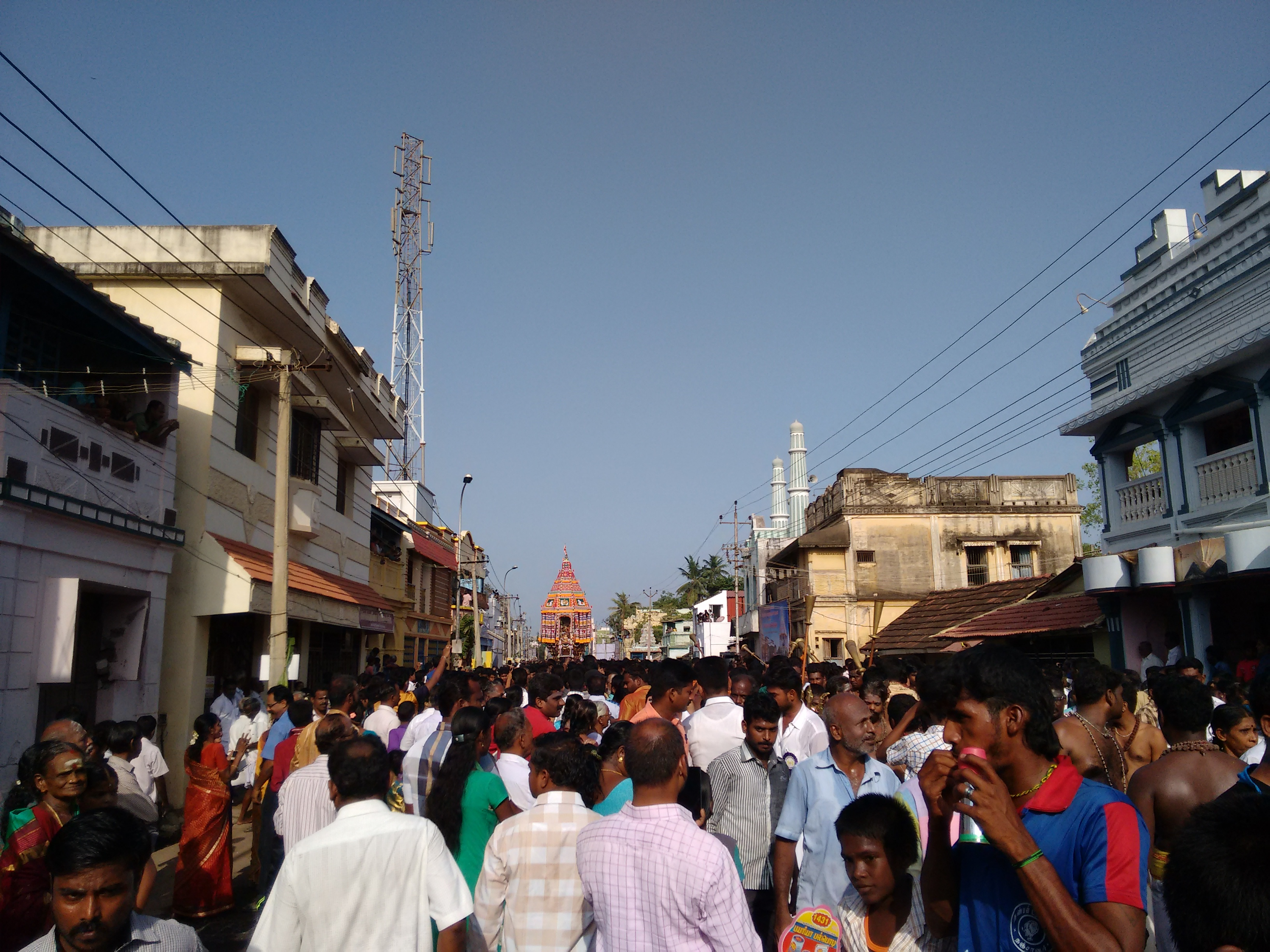
In the North Street

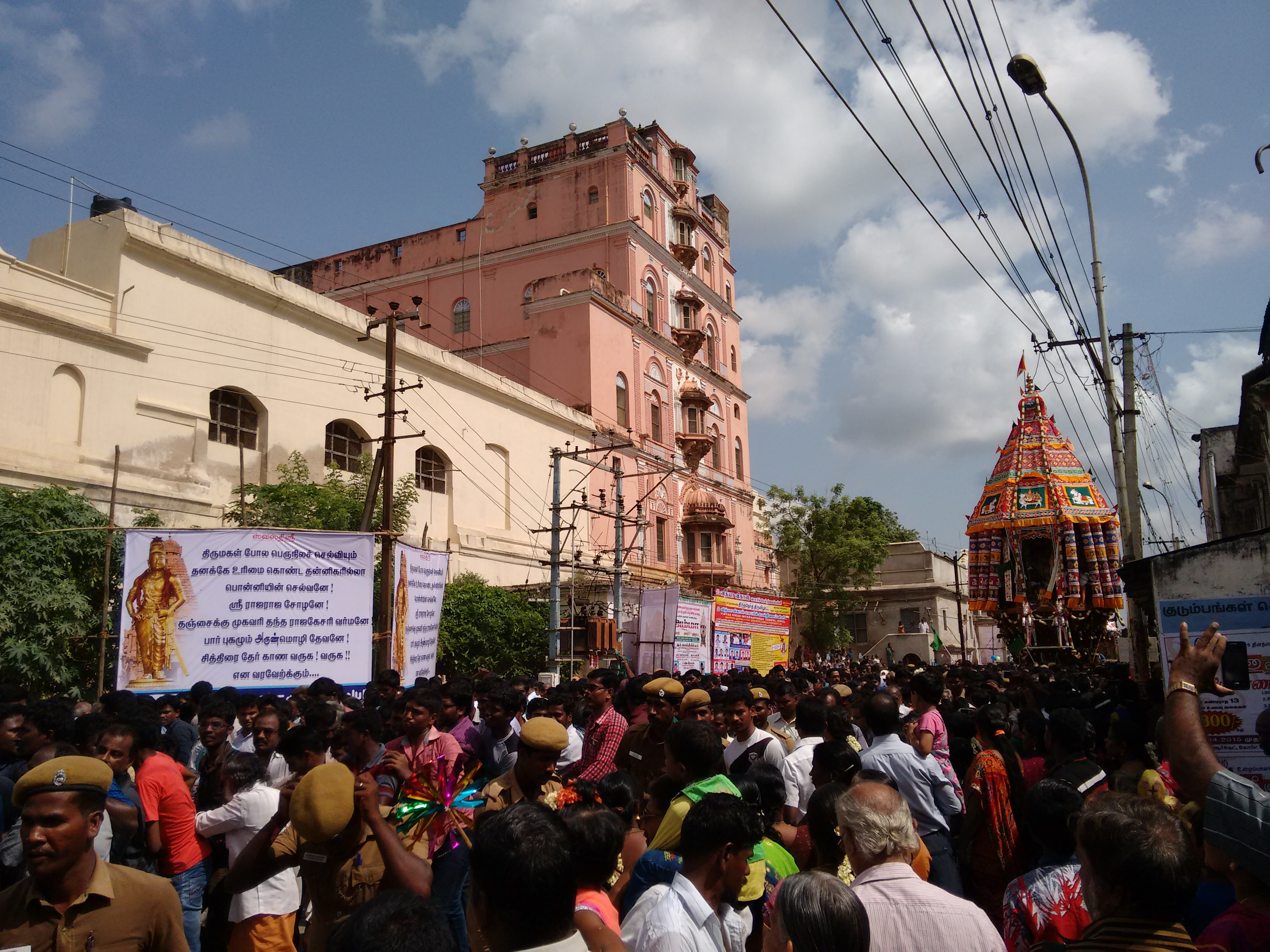
In the East Street
