= T. G. Aravamuthan =

- Born: 1890; Thirukannangudi, Nagapattinam, Madras Presidency, British India
- Died: 9 May 1970 (aged 79–80); Madras, Tamil Nadu, India
- Occupations: Archaeologist, numismatist

Thirukannangudi G. Aravamuthan (1890 – 9 May 1970) was an Indian archaeologist and numismatist.

== Biography ==
Aravamuthan was born in 1890 in a village near Thirukannangudi, in the Nagapattinam district of the erstwhile Madras Presidency of british India (in the present-day Indian State of Tamil Nadu). He completed his postgraduate studies, first in English, then in law before doing in various jobs such as proofreading for the newspaper The Hindu, appraiser of diamonds for a jeweller, English teacher at Pachaiyappa's College and law practise in the Madras High Court. His interest however lay in history. He served as the curator of Chennai's Government Museum for some time.

== Works ==
- The Kaveri, the Maukharis and the Sangam Age. University of Madras. 1925.
- Portrait Sculpture in South India. The India Society. 1931.
- Some Survivals of the Harappa Culture. Karnatak Publishing House. 1942.
