= Tiruchenkattankudi Uthirapasupatheeswarar Temple =

Tiruchenkattankudi Ganapathieswarar Temple

Religion
- Affiliation: Hinduism
- District: Nagapattinam
- Deity: Lord Shiva

Location
- Location: Tiruchengattankudi in Nagapattinam District
- State: Tamil Nadu
- Country: India
- Interactive map of Tiruchenkattankudi Ganapathieswarar Temple
- Coordinates: 10°51′48″N 79°43′21″E

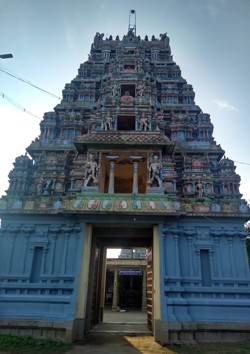
Rajagopura

Tiruchenkattankudi Uthirapasupatheeswarar Temple ( Tamil: திருச்செங்காட்டங்குடி உத்தராபதீசுவரர் கோயில்) is a Hindu temple located at Tiruchengattankudi in Nagapattinam District, Tamil Nadu, India. The historical name of the place is Ganapatheesaram. The temple is dedicated to Shiva, as the moolavar presiding deity, in his manifestation as Uthirapasupatheeswarar. His consort, Parvati, is known as Vaaitha Tirukuzhal Umai Nayaki.

== Significance ==
It is one of the shrines of the 275 Paadal Petra Sthalams - Shiva Sthalams glorified in the early medieval Tevaram poems by Tamil Saivite Nayanars Tirugnanasambandar and Tirunavukkarasar.

== Literary mention ==
Tirunavukkarasar describes the feature of the deity as:

பாலினால் நறுநெய்யாற் பழத்தினாற் பயின்றாட்டி

நூலினான் மணமாலை கொணர்ந்தடியார் புரிந்தேத்தச்
சேலினார் வயல்புடைசூழ் செங்காட்டங் குடியதனுள்

காலினாற் கூற்றுதைத்தான் கணபதீச் சரத்தானே.

== Gallery ==
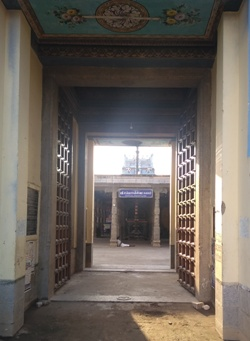
Entrance

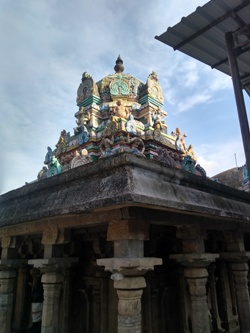
Vimana of the presiding deity

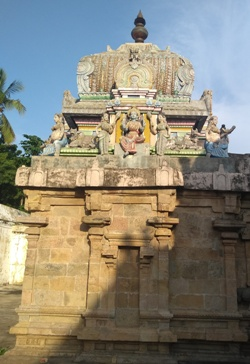
Vimana of the Goddess
