= Voimedu =

- village
- Nickname: Voimedu
- Location in Tamil Nadu, India. Voimedu (India)
- Country: India
- State: Tamil Nadu
- District: Nagapattinam

Government
  - Type: Panchayati raj (India)
  - Body: Gram panchayat

Languages
  - Official: Tamil
- Time zone: UTC+5:30 (IST)
- PIN: 614714

Voimedu is a village in Vedaranyam taluk, Nagapattinam district in Tamil Nadu, India. The ancient name of the village is 'Voimai' (Truth) 'medu' (place), but it changed gradually to 'Voimedu' by mispronunciation.

== Demographics ==
Voimedu is an agriculturally based village with a population of above 5000. There is a victory nursery and primary school. There is also the Indian Bank located there.
