= Kilvelur block =

Coordinates: 10.6565924°N 79.6144682°E

Kilvelur block is a revenue block in the Kilvelur taluk of Nagapattinam district, Tamil Nadu, India. There are a total of 51 panchayat villages in this block.
