= Kallimedu =

Village in Tamil Nadu, India

- Village
- Location in Tamil Nadu, India Kallimedu (India)
- Coordinates: 10°29′30″N 79°50′23″E
- Country: India
- State: Tamil Nadu
- District: Nagapattinam
- Taluk: Vedaranyam

Area
  - Total: 11.68 km^{2} (4.51 sq mi)

Population (2011)
  - Total: 5,341
  - Density: 457.3/km^{2} (1,184/sq mi)

Languages
  - Official: Tamil
- Time zone: UTC+5:30 (IST)
- Postal code: 614809
- Vehicle registration: TN-51
- Nearest city: Nagapattinam
- Lok Sabha constituency: Nagapattinam

Kallimedu is a village under the Talaignairu panchayat located near Vedaranyam in the Nagapattinam district, Tamil Nadu. As of the year 2011, it had a population of 5,341.

== Geography ==
Kallimedu is situated on the eastern shore of the Vedaranyam Canal, about 35 kilometres south of the district headquarter Nagapattinam. It has an average elevation of 2 metres above the sea level, and covers an area of 1167.7 hectares.

== Galleries ==
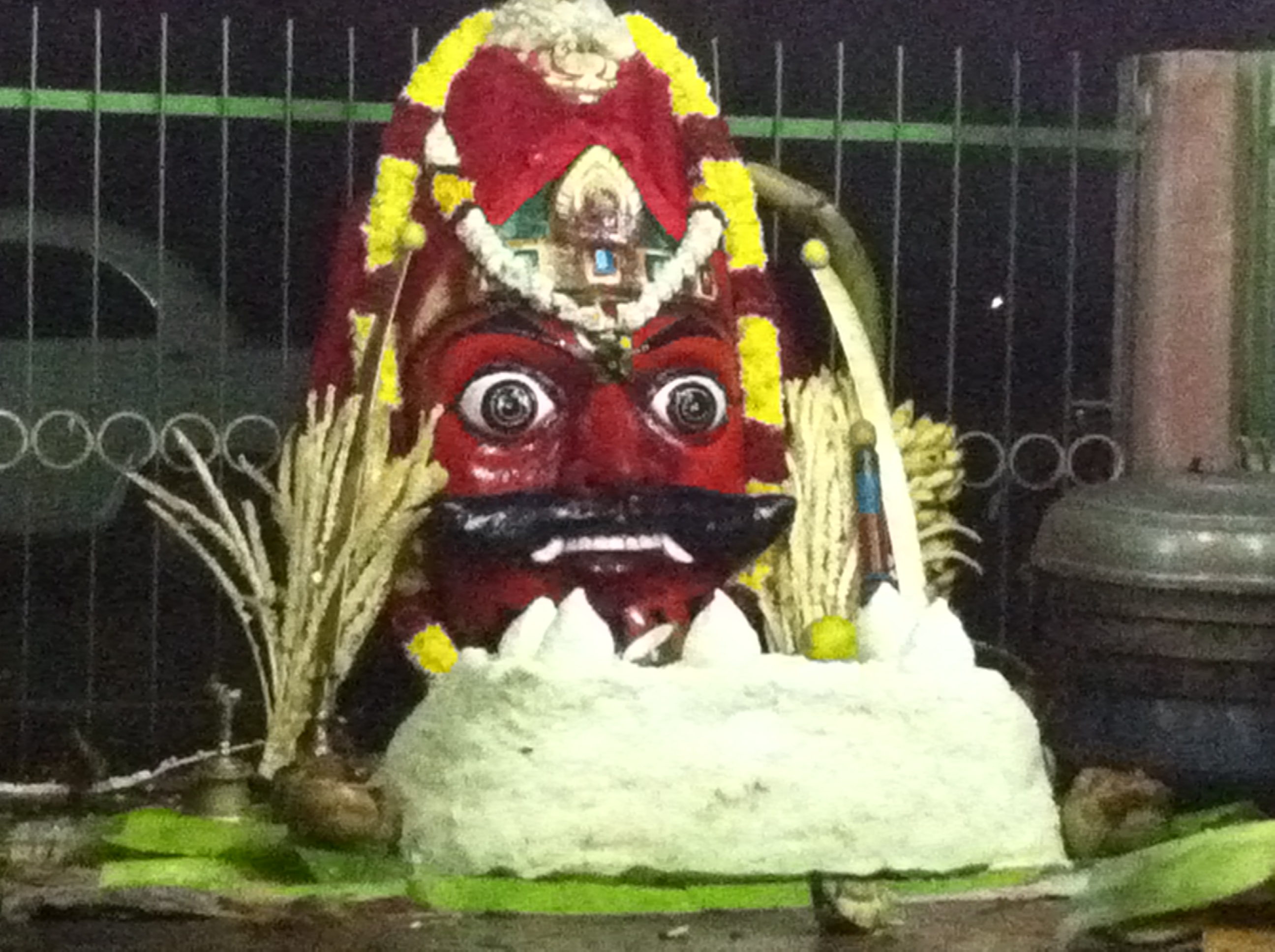
Pooja offerings for Sri Aravan

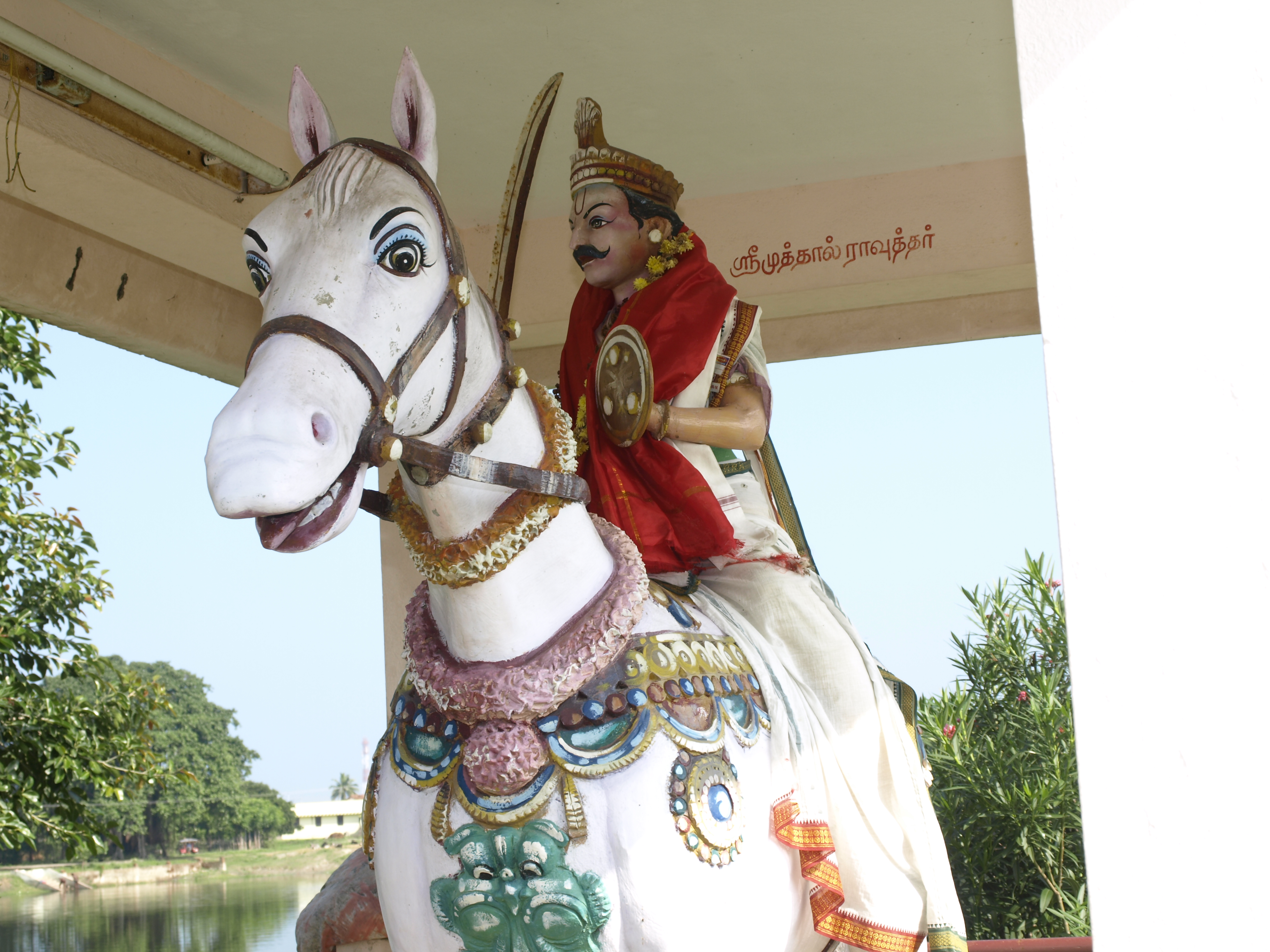
Sri Muthal Rawuther in Throwapathai amman Temple
