= Thulasiypattinam =

Village in India

Thulasiypattinam also spelt Thulajapattinam in the records of British India. This village is governed by Vanduvanchery Panchayat coming in Vedaranyam Taluk, Nagapattinam District of Tamil Nadu, India. Vedaranyam is the revenue headquarters of this village, located on the route of Vedaranyam to Muthupettai and this is surrounded by two towns namely Thiruthuraipoondi and Vedaranyam. A delta river (Valavanaru) running west side of this village. Hindu and Muslims are the majority people residing in this village.
