= Tiruppugalur Vardhamaneswaram =

Hindu temple in Tiruppugalur, India

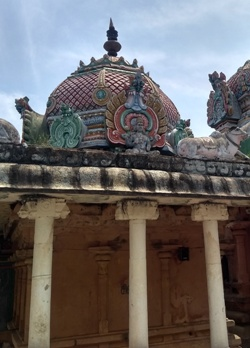
Vimana of Vardhamaneswarar

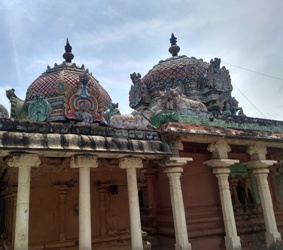
Vimanas of Agnipureeswarar and Vardhamaneswarar

Tiruppugalur Vardhamaneswaram (Tamil: திருப்புகலூர் வர்த்தமானீஸ்வரம்) is a Hindu temple located in Tiruppugalur in the Tiruvarur district of Tamil Nadu, India.

== Significance ==
It is one of the shrines of the 275 Paadal Petra Sthalams. Praises of the temple have been sung by Sambandar in the Thevaram. It is considered to be the 76th in the series of Tevara Stalams in the Chola kingdom located south of the river Kaveri. This is 139th temple in the Chola country Sambandar sings about the deity as "Vasa mamalar udayar Vardhamaneswarathare..." as under:

ஈசன்ஏறமர்கடவுள் இன்னமுது எந்தை எம்பெருமான்
பூசுமாசில் வெண்ணீற்றர் பொலிவுடைப் பூம்புகலூரில்
மூசுவண்டறை ன்றை முருகன்முப்போதுஞ் செய்முடிமேல்
வாசமாமல ருடையார் வர்த்த மானீச்சரத்தாரே.

== 76th temple ==
Of the Paadal Petra Sthalams Thiruppugalur Vardhamaneeswaram is the 76th temple. This is found in the Chola Naadu of Tamil Nadu in the South of river Kaveri (128 temples)

== Speciality ==
The temple Theertham is known as Agni Theertham. This Shivastalam is a part of the Agnipureeswarar Temple, Thirupugalur temple. The vimanas of these shrines are found side by side.

== Presiding deity ==
The presiding deity is Shiva. He is known as Vardhamaneswarar. The goddess of the temple is Karunthazhkuzhali. As the shrines of Vardhamaneswarar and Agniswarar are found as one shrine one has to circumambulate these shrines at one stretch. It is not possible to go around the shrine of Vardhamaneswarar. Apart from this presiding deity has no separate flagpost and kosta sculptures. The presiding deity is also known as Konal lingam, i.e., it appears as distorted or skewed manner. So, it is also known as Konal Piran.

== Vaikasi Visakam ==
Vaikasi Visakam festival is celebrated in a grand manner in this temple.
