= Agnipureeswarar Temple, Thirupugalur =

Hindu temple in Nagapattinam district, Tamil Nadu, India

Agnipureeswarar Temple
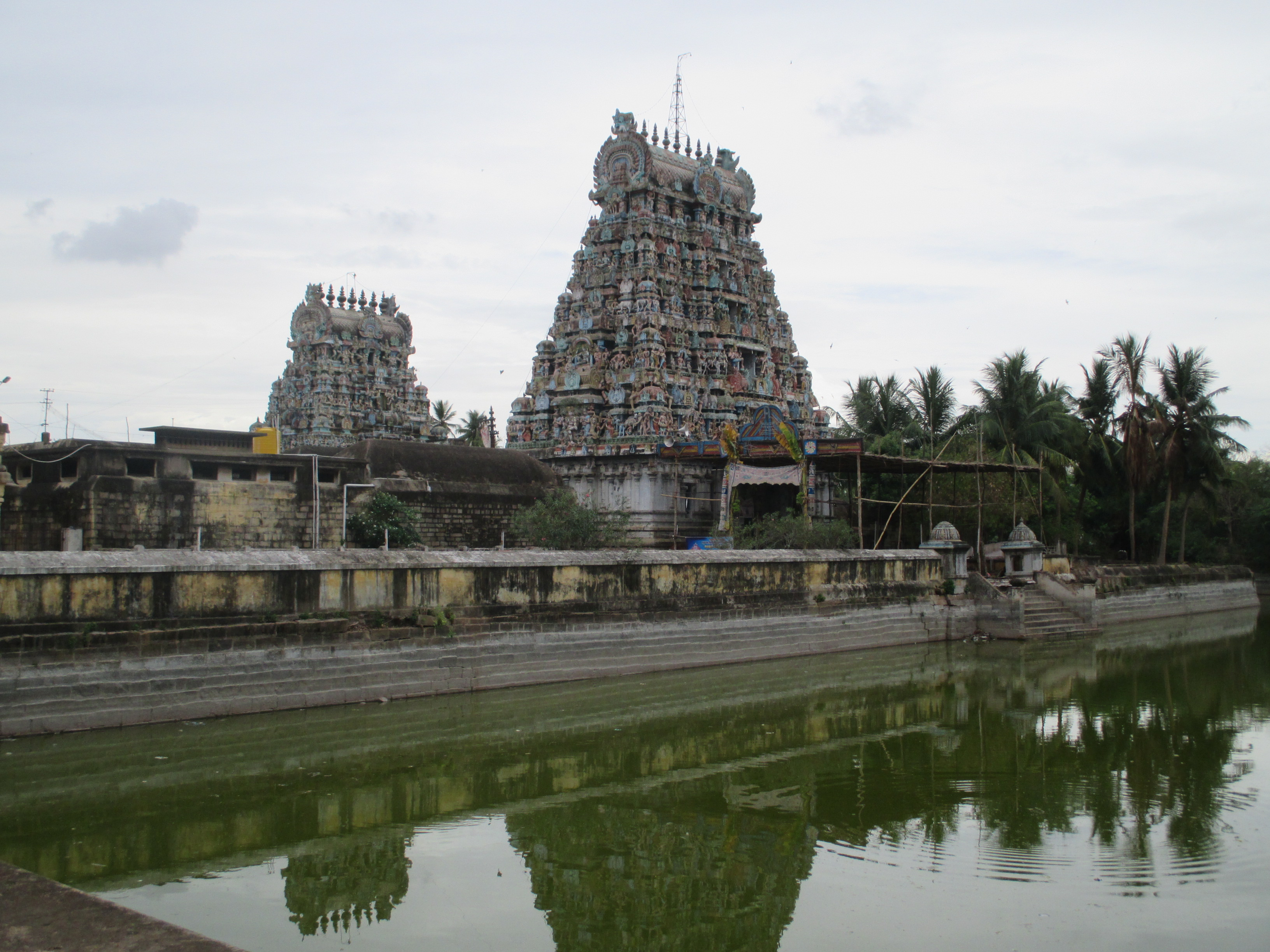

- Location in Tamil Nadu

Religion
- Affiliation: Hinduism
- District: Nagapattinam
- Deity: Agnipureeswarar(Shiva) Karundar Kuzhali, Shoolikambal(Parvathi)

Location
- Location: Thirupugalur
- State: Tamil Nadu
- Country: India
- Coordinates: 10°53′05″N 79°42′11″E

Architecture
- Type: Tamil architecture

Agnipureeswarar Temple (also called Thirupugalur temple) in Thirupugalur, a village in Nagapattinam district in the South Indian state of Tamil Nadu, is dedicated to the Hindu god Shiva. Constructed in the Tamil style of architecture, the temple is believed to have been built during the Cholas period in the 10th century. Shiva is worshipped as Agnipureeswarar and his consort Parvathi as Karundar Kuzhali.

A granite wall surrounds the temple, enclosing all its shrines. The temple has a five-tiered Rajagopurams, the gateway tower.

Six daily rituals and three yearly festivals are held at the temple. The temple is maintained and administered by the Hindu Religious and Endowment Board of the Government of Tamil Nadu.

== Legend ==
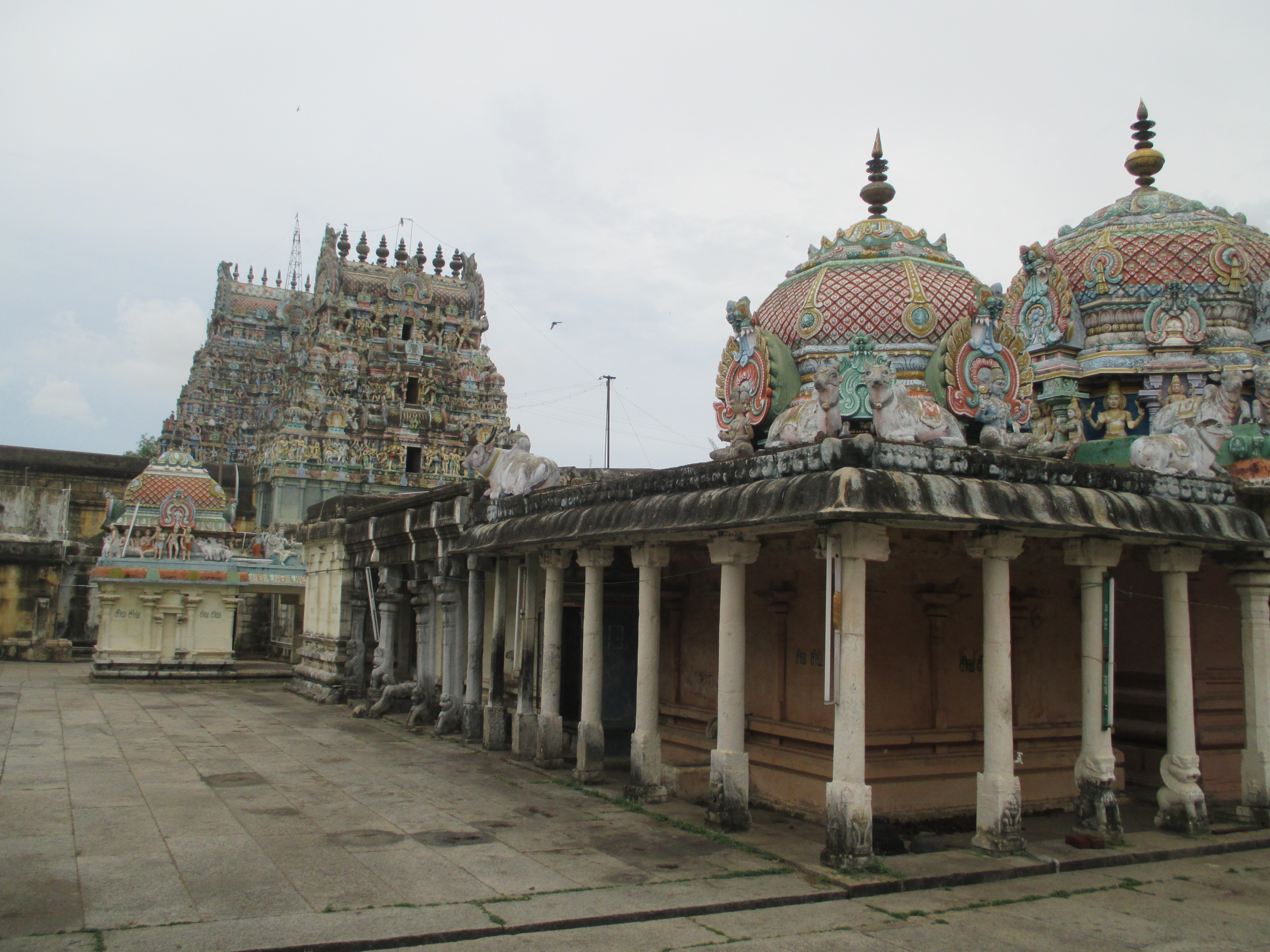
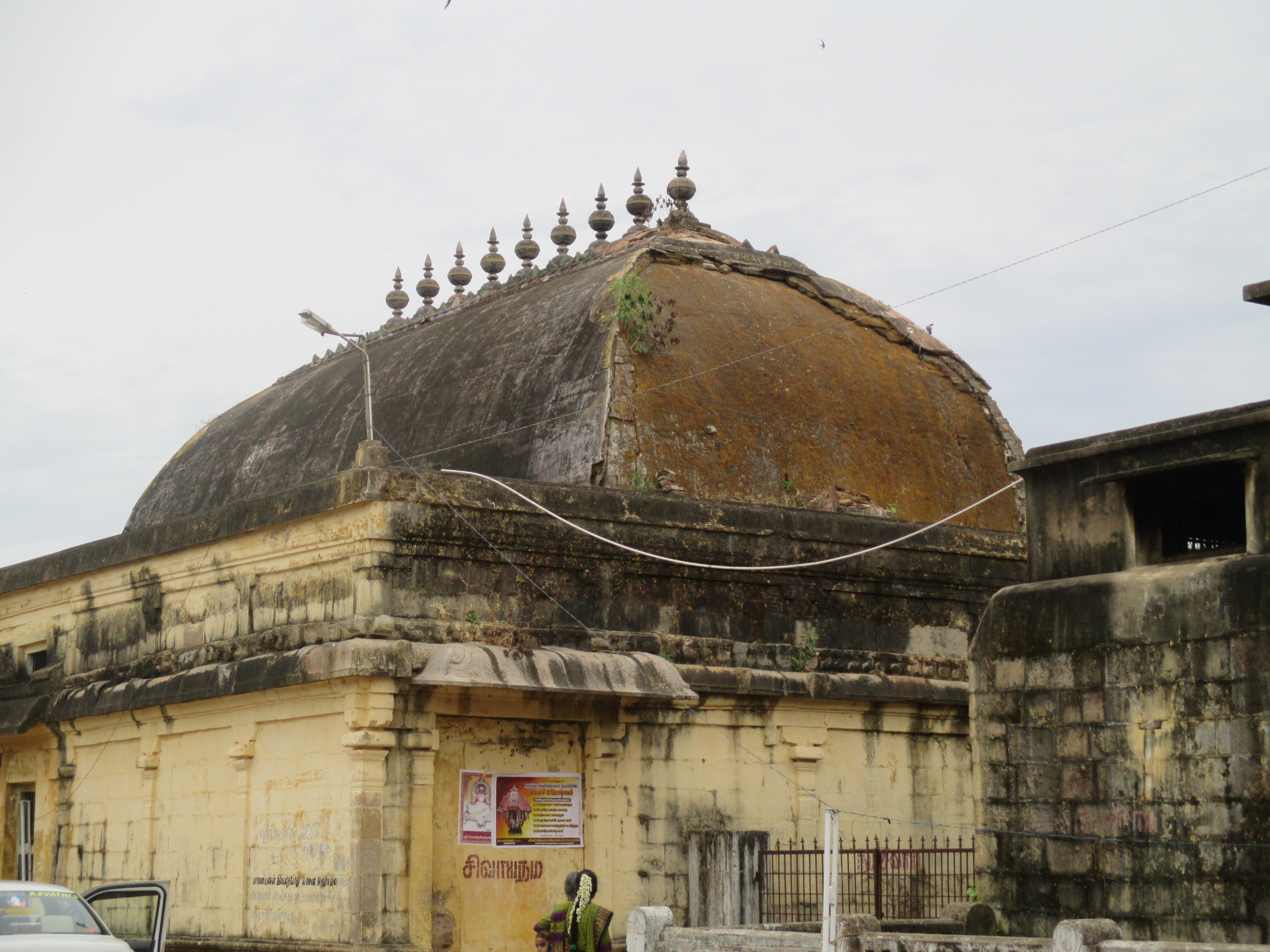
Image of shrines in the temple

The exact history of the temple could not determined based on the inscriptions evidence, but the temple is believed to have been built during the Chola period during the 10th-11th centuries.

As per Hindu legend and the Sthalapurana, Shiva was worshipped by Agni, the fire god at this place and the presiding deity came to be known as Agnipureeswarar and the temple tank is called Agni theertham. As per another legend, Bhudevi, the consort of Vishnu wanted to install a Linga and worship Shiva. Banasura, her son, is believed to have dug the Linga at the place, but could not lift it. The lingam in the place is believed to appear tilted (called Konapiran) on account of it. Shiva was pleased with the devotion of Bhudevi and appeared in his dancing form in front of her. It is also believed to be the place where Shiva turned bricks into gold for the Nayanar Sundarar.

== History ==
The temple has inscriptions dating from Uttama Chola (970–985 CE) from the 10th century. The inscriptions from the time of Rajaraja I (ARE 47 of 1927-28) indicates tax free gifts of land for conducting festivals and for providing offering to the temple every year by Panchanvan Mahadeviyar, one of the consorts of the ruler. Another inscription (ARE 68 of 1927-28) dated to the 27th regnal year of the king indicates gift of paddy and money by Angikumara Gramavittan. The inscriptions (ARE 44 of 1927-28) from the period of Rajendra I (1012–1044 CE) indicates exemption of taxes for certain lands belonging to the temple. The records from Rajadhiraja (ARE 49 of 1927-28) indicates offering by Pichan Sirudaikal of Saliamangalam making a gift of offering to the ashtamangalam ceremony, the eight steps of bathing of the deity (mirror, water-pot, flag, fly-wisk, elephant goad, drum, lamp and a pair of fish). Exclusion of land tax for certain lands of the temple are found from the inscriptions (ARE 79 of 1927-28) from the period of Rajendra Chola II (1054–1063 CE). From the inscriptions it is deducted that the first precinct was probably built during this time. There are also inscriptions from private donors indicating donations of festival images to the temple (ARE 57 & 63 of 1927-28).

== Architecture ==
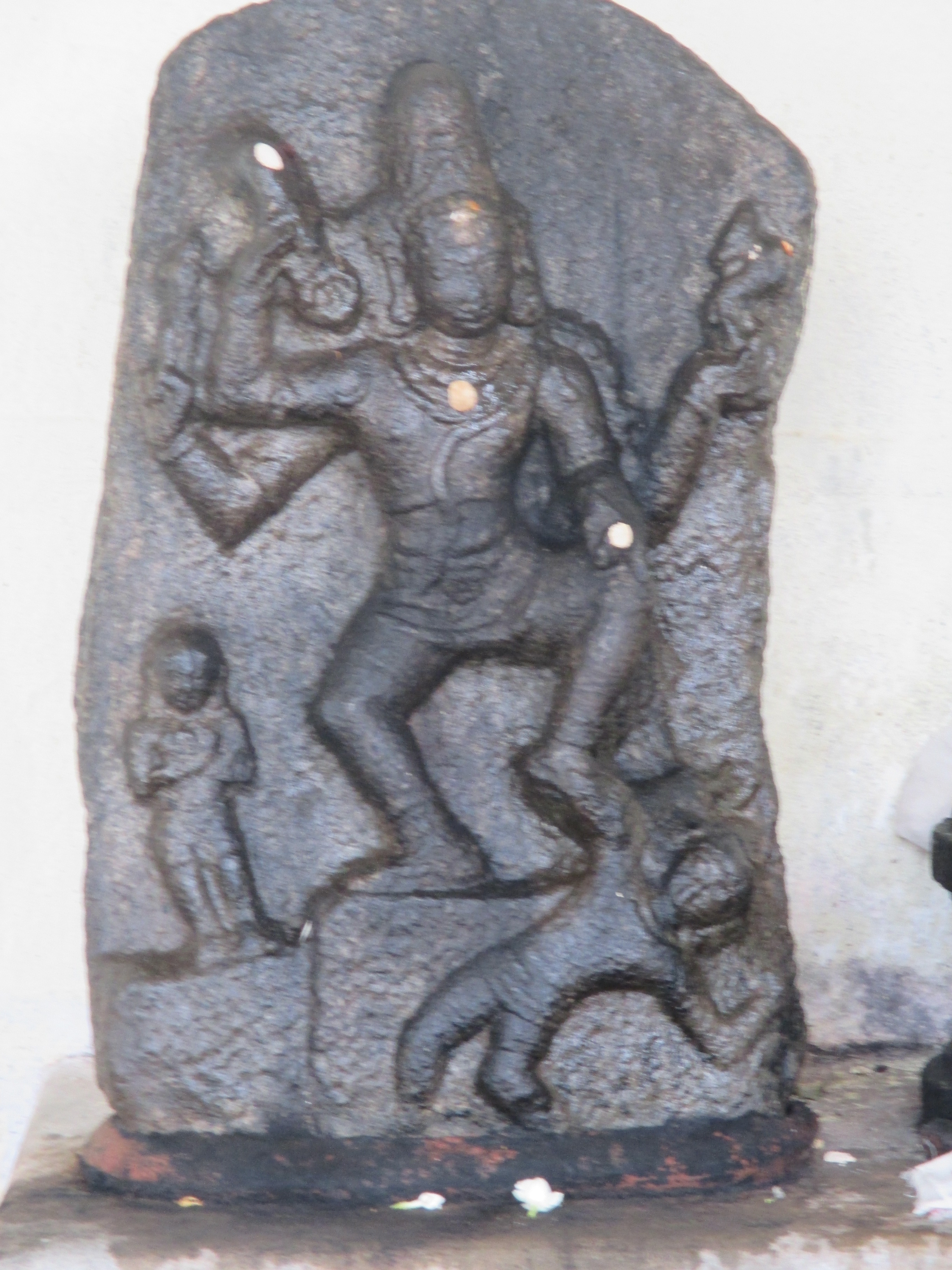
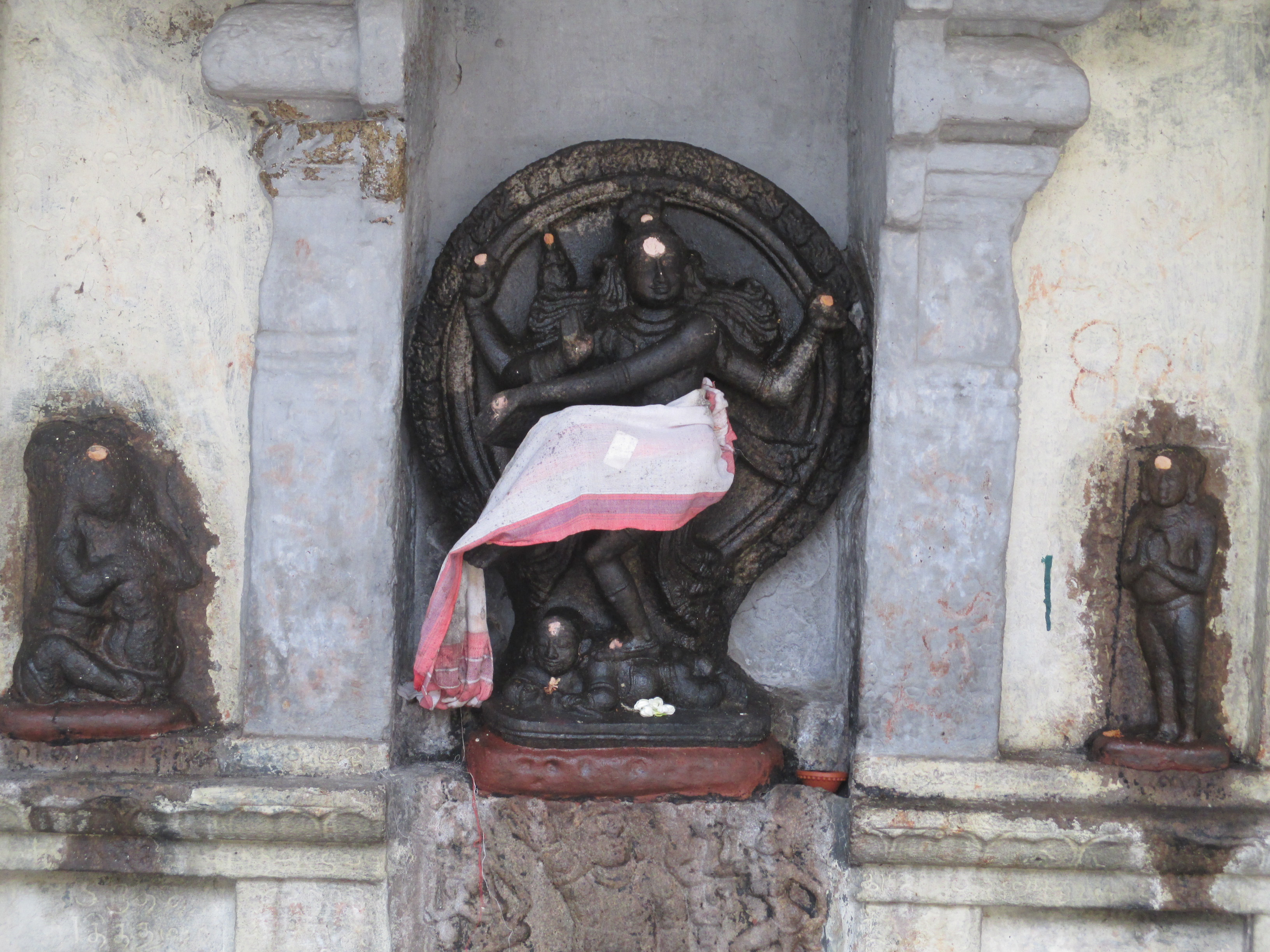
Image of Nataraja

The temple has a five-tiered rajagopuram, the gateway tower facing east and an inner three tier gopuram. The temple is surrounded by a moat like tank and the major portion of the tank is called Agni theertham located in front of the gateway tower. The sanctum is approached through the gateway tower, flagpost, a mahamandapam and an arthamandapam. The Mahamandapam houses the images of Agni, Brahma and saint Appar. The bronze idol of Agni is one of its kind, not present anywhere in the state. The image has two heads and sported with three legs. The sanctum houses the image of Agnipureeswarar in the form of Lingam, a phallic symbol of Shiva. The Linga is tilted indicating a legend that Shiva offered to bend for his devotees.

There is another shrine of Shiva called Vardhamaneeswarar, in the name of Tiruppugalur Vardhamaneswaram located adjacent to the sanctum and the image of Muruga Nayanar is located opposite to the sanctum. It is counted as another Paadal Petra Sthalam as it is also glorified in the verses of Tevaram. There is a separate shrine of Karundarkuzhi, the consort of Shiva, sported in standing posture in a South facing shrine. The inner precinct of the temple houses the image of the sixty three nayanmar, Agni, Panchalinga, Appar, Vatapi Ganapathy, Subramanya, Sanisvara, Annapurani, Mahalakshmi and Kalasamhara, while the outer precinct has the images of Chintamanisvara, Vinayaga and the Linga worshipped by sage Bharatvaja.

== Religious importance and festivals ==
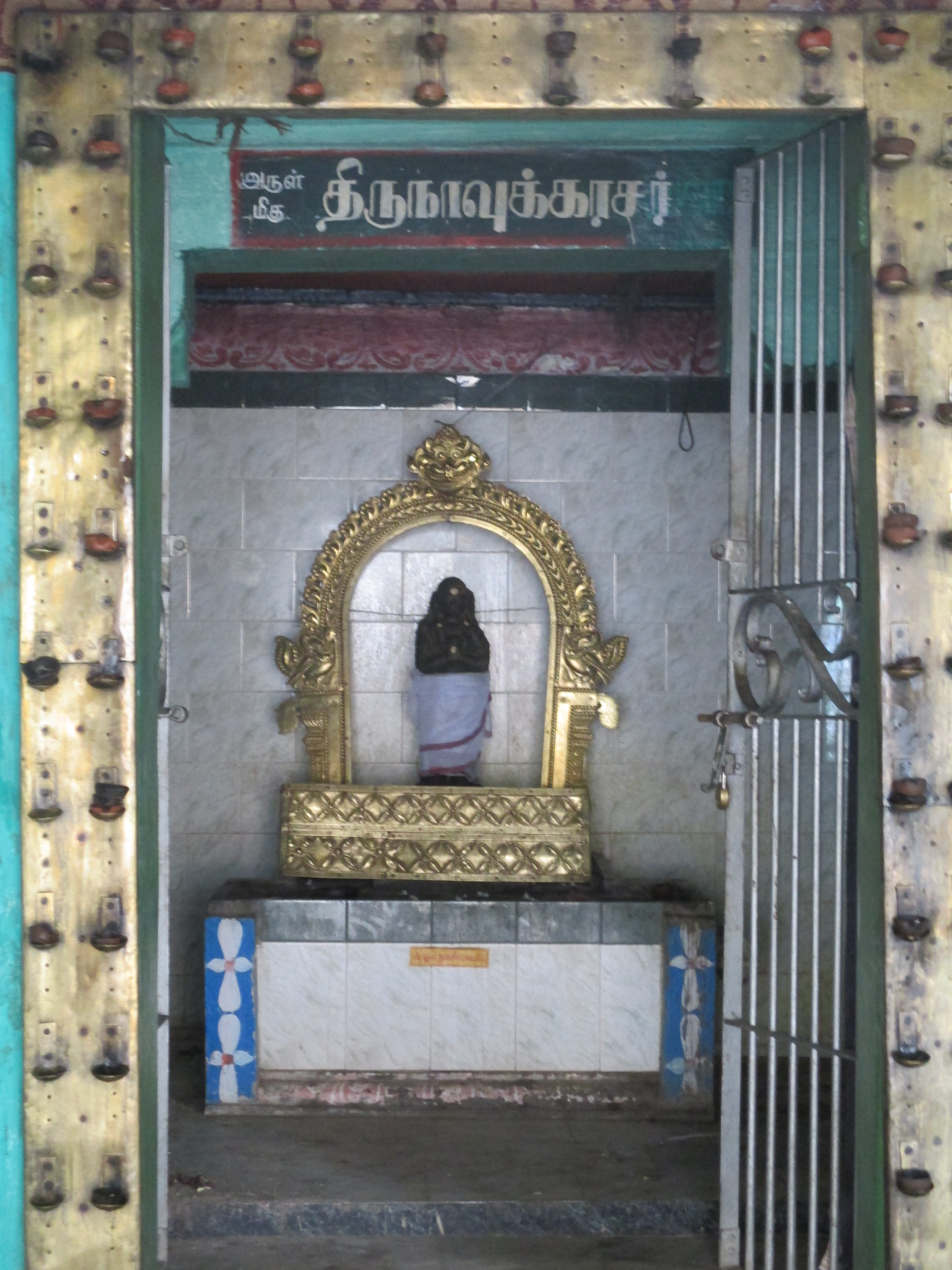
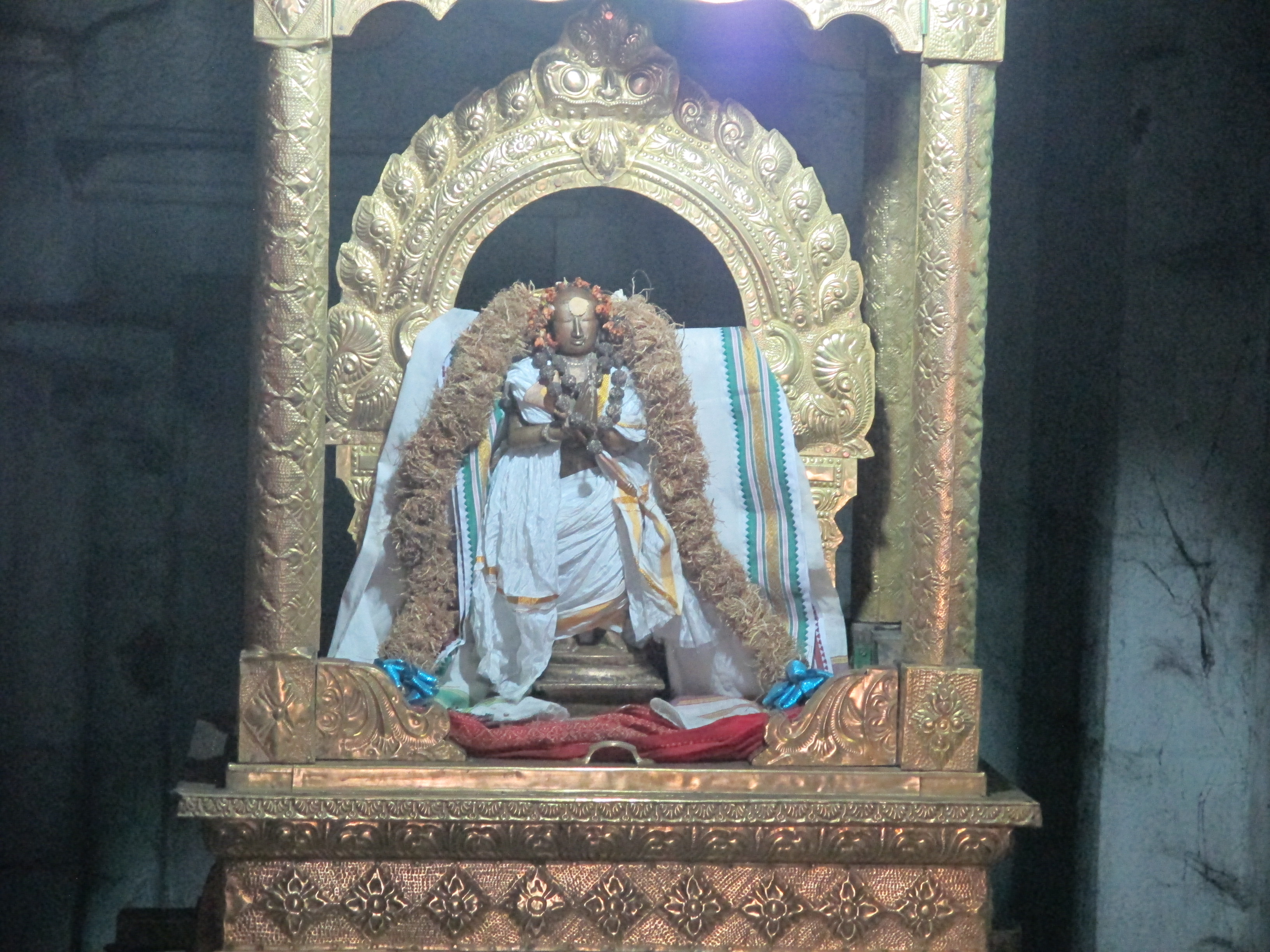
Image of Appar

Appar, a 7th-century Tamil poet, is said to have "attained liberation" at the site of the temple.

Unlike other shiva temples, anointing with oil is not performed in the temple. There are weekly rituals and monthly festivals.

== Gallery ==
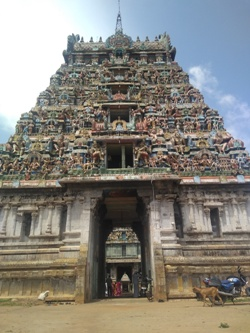
Rajagopura

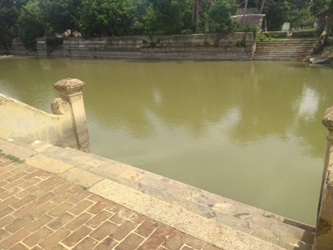
Tank in front of the temple

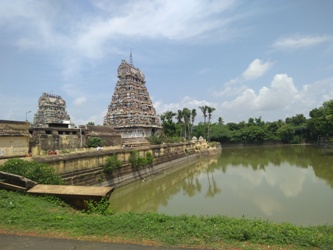
Rajagopura and Inner gopura

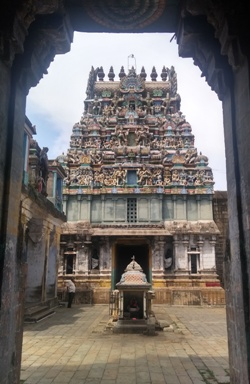
Inner gopura

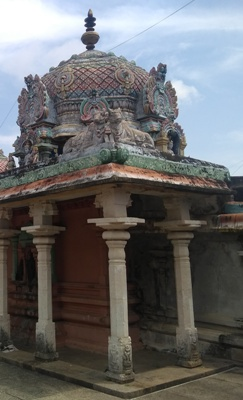
Vimana of presiding deity Agnipureeswarar

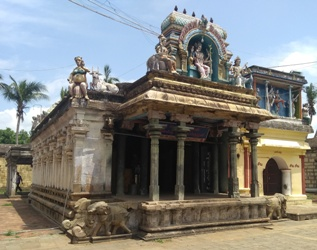
Vimana of Goddess

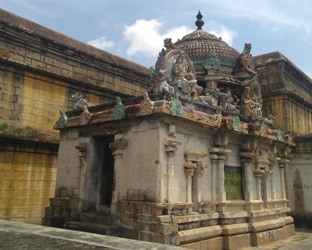
Shrine of Somanayakar

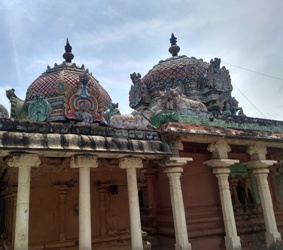
Vimanas of Agnipureeswarar and Vardhamaneswarar

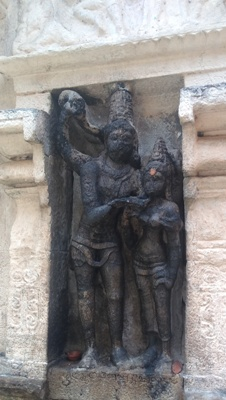
Kosta sculpture
