= Vedaranyam taluk =

Taluk of Nagapattinam district, Tamil Nadu, India

Coordinates: 10°22′31″N 79°51′1″E

Vedaranyam taluk is a taluk of Nagapattinam district of the Indian state of Tamil Nadu. The headquarters of the taluk is the town of Vedaranyam

== Demographics ==
According to the 2011 census, the taluk of Vedaranyam had a population of 215,653 with 107,007 males and 108,646 females. There were 1,015 women for every 1,000 men. The taluk had a literacy rate of 76.14%. Child population in the age group below 6 was 9,589 Males and 9,083 Females.

== Villages ==
*

- Thanikotakam*
- Thethakudi*
- Vaimedu*
- Ayakkaranpulam*
- Karuppampulam*
- Katharipulam
- Pushpavanam
- Thulasiypattinam
- PANCHANTHIKULAM
- Thamaraipulam*
