= Kilvelur =

Panchayat town in India

- Panchayat town
- Kilvelur
- Location in Tamil Nadu, India
- Coordinates: 10.764°N 79.74°E
- Country: India
- State: Tamil Nadu
- District: Nagapattinam

Government
  - Body: Town panchayat

Area
  - Total: 9.50 km^{2} (3.67 sq mi)
- Elevation: 8 m (26 ft)

Population (2011)
  - Total: 8,272
  - Density: 871/km^{2} (2,260/sq mi)

Languages
  - Official: Tamil
- Time zone: UTC+5:30 (IST)
- PIN: 611104
- Telephone code: 91 4366
- Vehicle registration: TN51

Kilvelur is a panchayat town in kilvelur taluk in the district of Nagapattinam district in the Indian state of Tamil Nadu.

== Famous Towns nearby ==
It is 12 km east of Tiruvarur, 12 km west of Nagapattinam and 6 km west of Sikkal, a famous Murugan shrine. Nagapattinam, Thiruvarur, Karaikal, Thiruthuraipoondi are the nearby Cities to kilvelur

== Literacy ==
The literacy rate of Kilvelur city is 89.82%, higher than the state average of 80.09%. In Kilvelur, male literacy is around 94.33% while the female literacy rate is 85.60%.

== Demographics ==
The female Sex Ratio is of 1058 against state average of 996. Moreover, the child sex ratio in Kilvelur is around 938, compared to Tamil Nadu state average of 943.

== Population ==
As of 2011 India census, Kilvelur had a population of 8,272 of which 4,020 are males while 4,252 are females as per report released by Census India 2011. in Kilvelur Town Panchayat
