= Nagapattinam district =

- District of Tamil Nadu
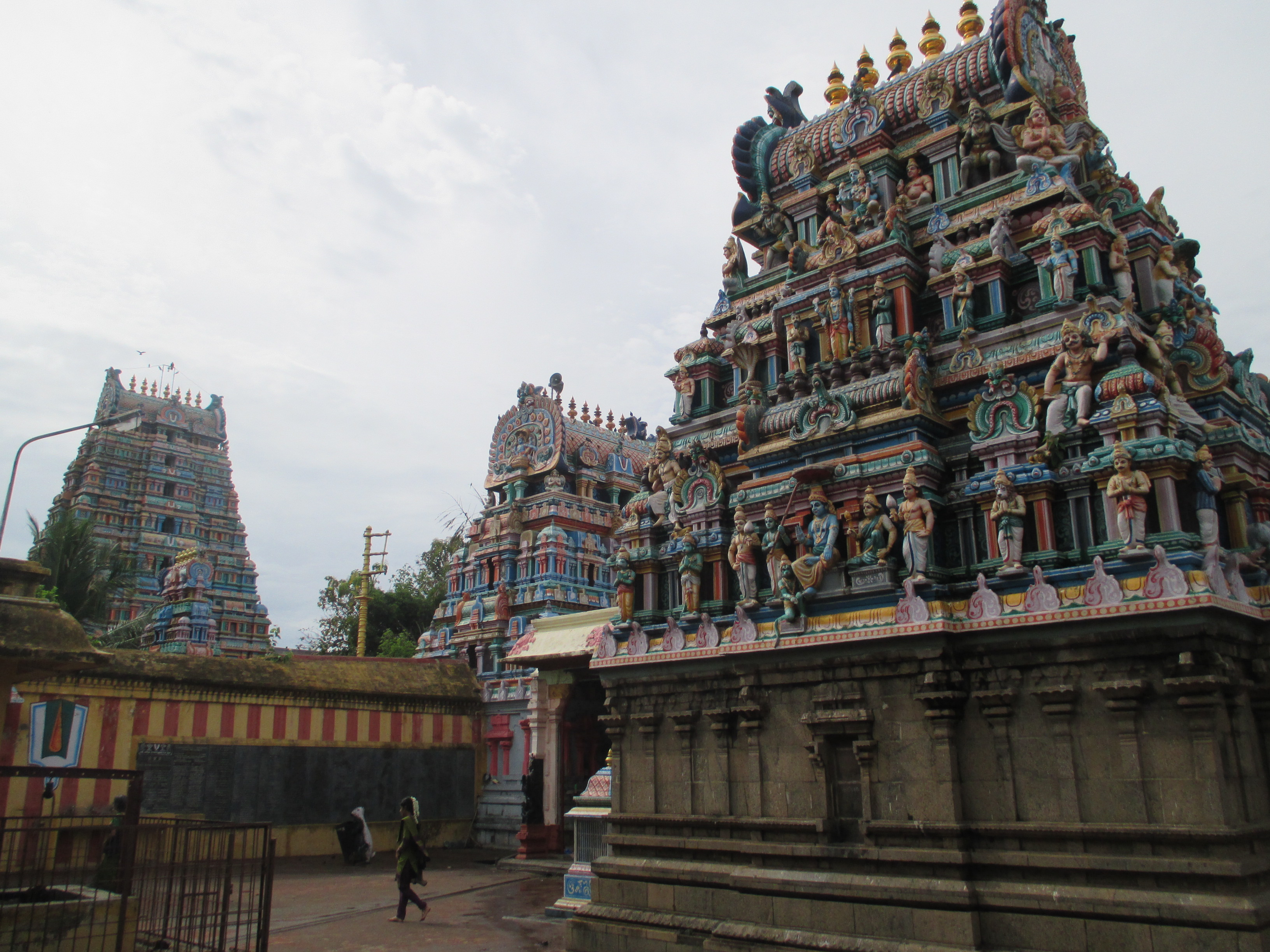
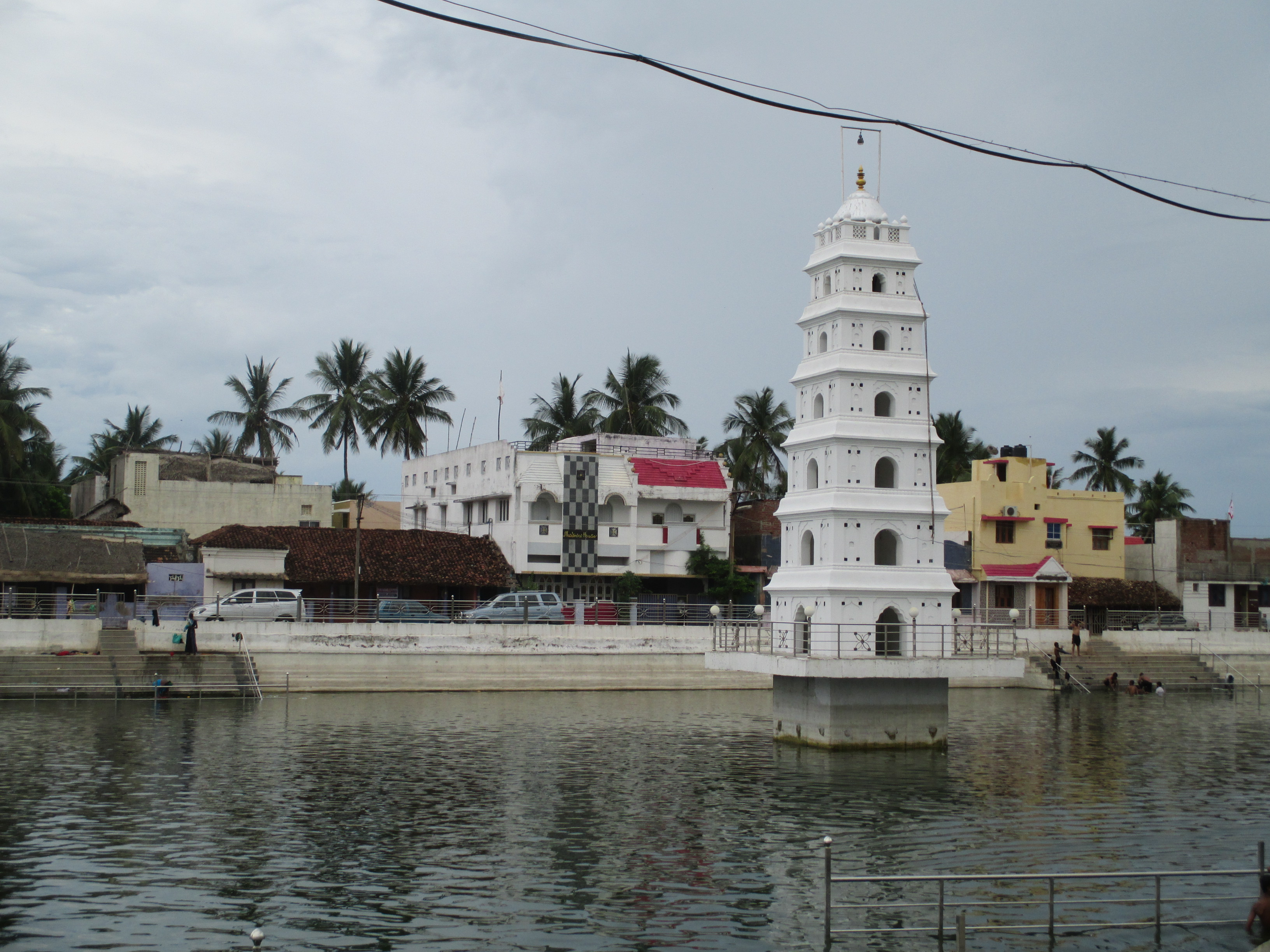
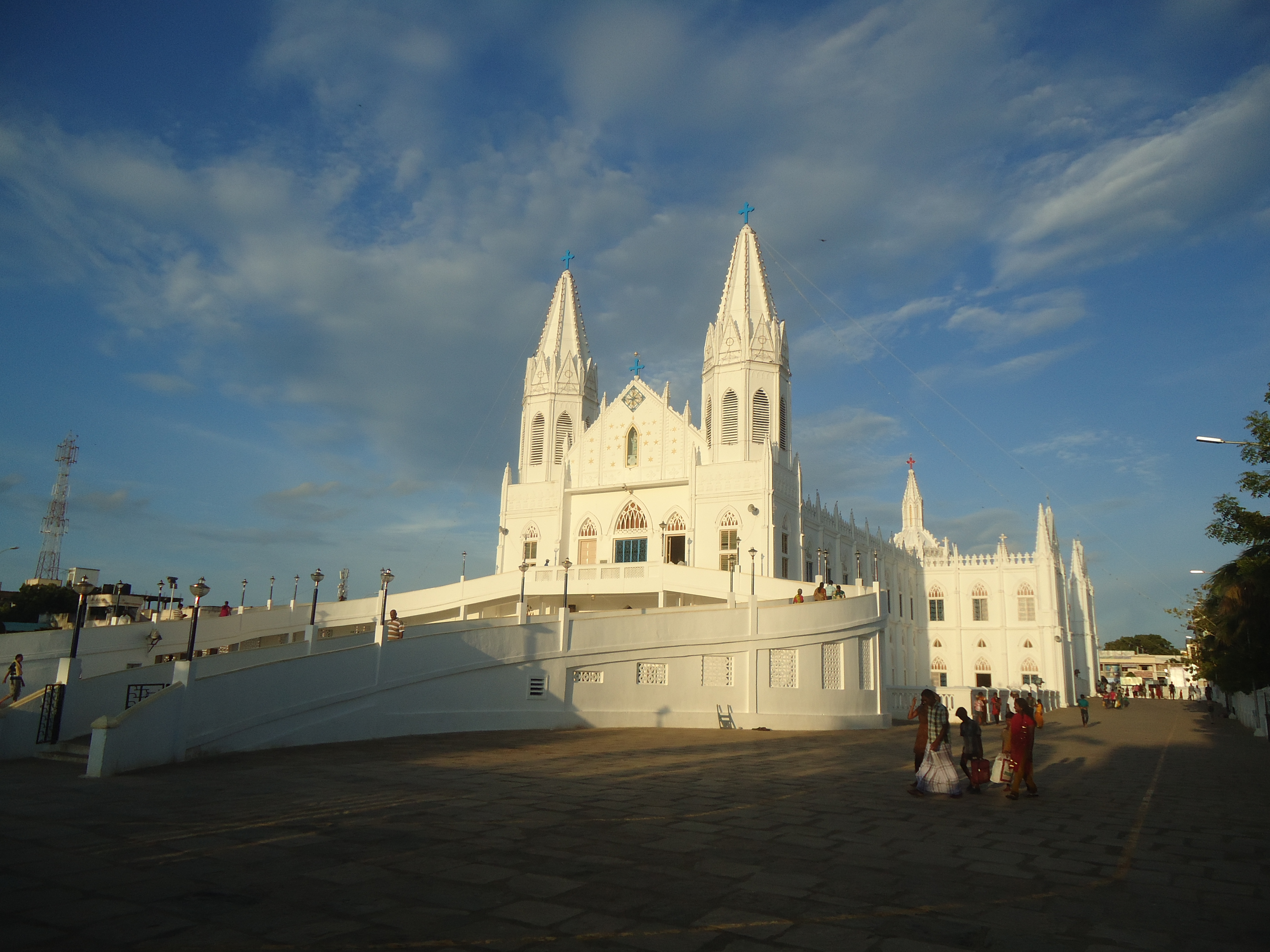
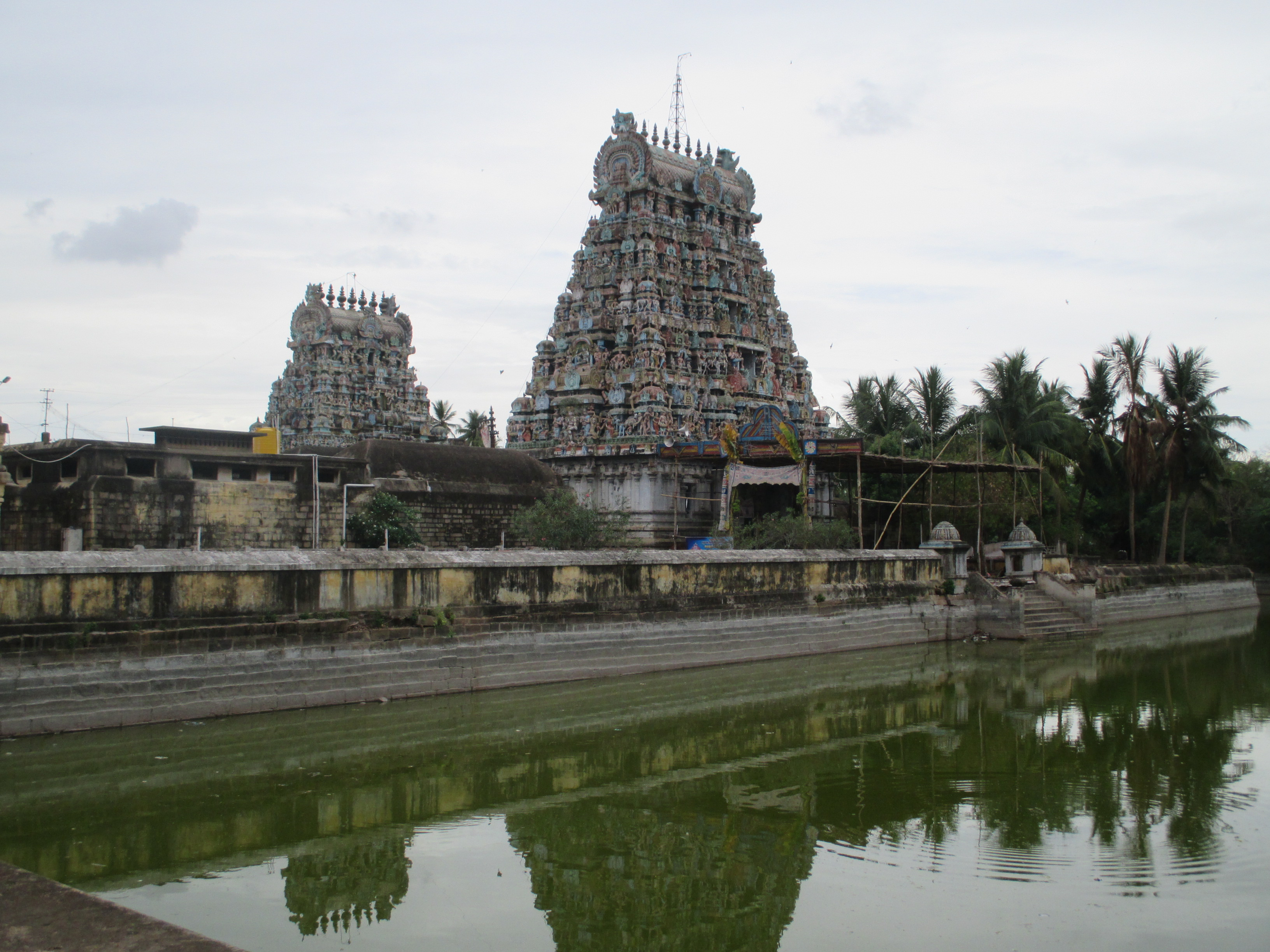
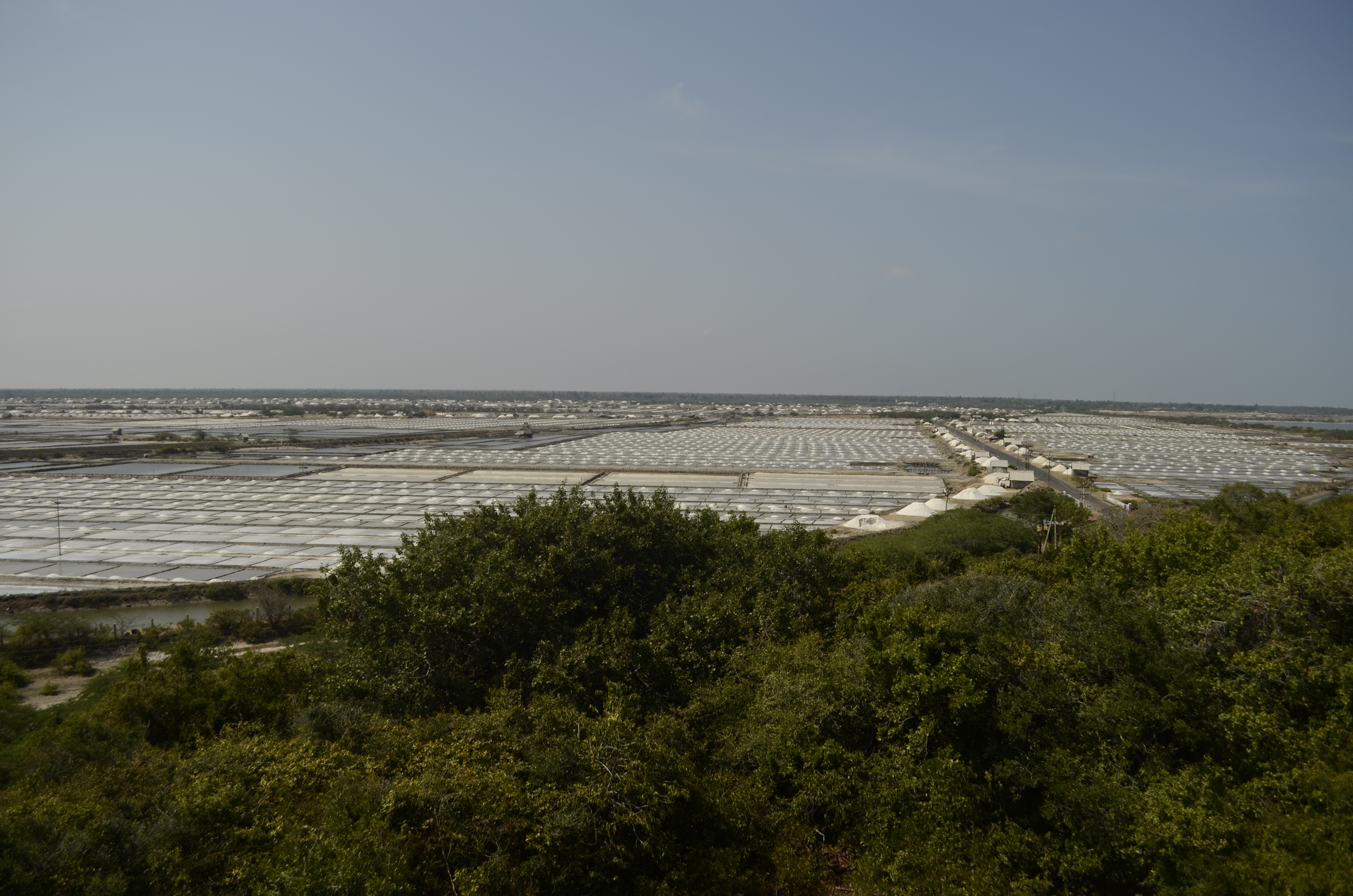
- Clockwise from top-left: Sri Soundararajaperumal temple in Nagapattinam, Nagore Dargah, Agnipureeswarar Temple, Thirupugalur, Salt pans in Point Calimere Wildlife Sanctuary, Basilica of Our Lady of Good Health in Velankanni

- Location in Tamil Nadu
- Coordinates: 10°46′1.2″N 79°49′58.8″E
- Country: India
- State: Tamil Nadu
- Established: 18 October 1991
- Founder: J. Jayalalithaa
- Taluks: Kilvelur, Nagapattinam, Thirukkuvalai, Vedaranyam

Government
  - Type: Municipality
  - District Collector: A. Arun Thamburaj, IAS
  - Superintendent of Police: G. Jawahar, IPS

Area
  - Total: 1,397 km^{2} (539 sq mi)
  - Rank: 36
- Elevation: 9 m (30 ft)

Population (2011)
  - Total: 697,069
  - Rank: 37
  - Density: 498/km^{2} (1,290/sq mi)

Languages
  - Official: Tamil
- Time zone: UTC+5:30 (IST)
- Telephone code: 04365
- ISO 3166 code: ISO 3166-2:IN
- Vehicle registration: TN-51
- Lok Sabha constituency: 1
- Vidhan Sabha constituency: 5
- Website: nagapattinam.nic.in

Nagapattinam district is one of the 38 districts of Tamil Nadu state in southern India. Nagapattinam district was carved out by bifurcating the erstwhile composite Thanjavur district on 19 October 1991. The town of Nagapattinam is the district headquarters.

Until Mayiladuthurai district was created out of it on 24 March 2020, Nagapattinam was the only discontiguous district in Tamil Nadu.

== Etymology ==
Nagapattinam is derived from Nagar, referring to people, and pattinam referring to town. In Tamil Pattinam and paakkam depicts coastal towns. The town was also called Cholakula Vallipattinam during the Chola period, when it was one of the important ports. Ptolemy refers to Nagapattinam as Nikam and mentions it as one of the most important trade centres of the ancient Tamil country. This view is doubtful as there is no contemporary evidence to prove the existence of the town as a metropolis in the name of "Nikama" or "Nikam". Nagapattinam was referred to by early writers and the Portuguese as "the city of Coromandel". The place is revered in Nalayira Divya Prabandham as Nagai in the 5th to 9th century CE Vaishnava canon, by Alvars. It is considered one of the important temples visited by Thirumangai Alvar. Appar and Sambandar, the 7th-century saint poets refer to the city as Nagai in their verses in Tevaram. The town was originally called "Nagai"; the word Pattinam was attached during the Chola era when the town emerged as an important port.

== History ==
Nagapattinam district was an important region of the Chola kingdom. There are urn burials in and around the city from the Sangam period indicating some level of human habitation. The neighbouring port, Kaveripoompattinam (modern day Poompuhar), was the capital of the Chola kingdom of the Sangam Age, referred to widely in Tamil scriptures like Paṭṭiṉappālai.

The early works of Tevaram by the 7th-century poets Appar and Sambandar mention that the town had fortified walls, busy roads, buildings and a busy port. The inscriptions from the Kayarohanswami temple indicate the construction was initiated during the reign of the Pallava king, Narasimha Pallava II (691 – 729 CE). A Buddhist pagoda was built under Chinese influence by the Pallava king and town was frequented by Buddhist travellers. In the 11th century CE, Chudamani Vihara, a Buddhist monastery was built by Javanese king Sri Vijaya Soolamanivarman with the patronage of Raja Raja Chola. Nagapattinam was the prominent port of Cholas for trade and conquering gateway to the east.

In the early 16th century the Portuguese made commercial contacts with the town and established a commercial centre in 1554 CE. The Portuguese also conducted missionary enterprise in the town. In 1658, the Dutch established an agreement with King Vijaya Nayakkar of Thanjavur on 5 January 1662. Ten villages were transferred from the Portuguese to the Dutch – Nagappattinam Port, Puthur, Muttam, Poruvalancheri, Anthanappettai, Karureppankadu, AzhingiMangalam, Sangamangalam, Thiruthinamangalam, Manjakollai, Nariyankudi. Ten Christian churches and a hospital were built by the Dutch. They also released coins with the name Nagappattinam engraved in Tamil letters. Under an agreement between the first Maratta King Egoji of Thanjavur and the Dutch, Naagappattinam and surrounding villages were handed over to the Dutch on 30 December 1676. In 1690, the capital of Dutch Coromandel moved from Pulicat to Nagapattinam.

This town fell into the hands of the British in 1781 after the two naval battles between British and French fleets were fought off the coast of Negapatam, as it was then known: the first in 1758 as part of the Seven Years' War and the second in 1782 as part of the American Revolutionary War. The town was taken by the British from the Dutch in 1781 (who had been formally brought into the war in 1780). When the Dutch and British reached a peace agreement in 1784, Nagapattinam was formally ceded to the British. 277 villages, with Nagore as the headquarters, were handed over to the East India Company.

From 1799 to 1845 CE Nagapttinam was the headquarters of Tanjore district. Nagapattinam and Nagore were incorporated as a single municipality in 1866 CE. The town remained one of the chief ports to the Madras Presidency. The port suffered decline after the inclusion of Tranquebar and Tuticorin.

The 2004 Indian Ocean earthquake was an undersea megathrust earthquake that occurred on 26 December 2004, with an epicentre off the west coast of Sumatra, Indonesia, triggering a series of devastating tsunamis along the coasts of most landmasses bordering the Indian Ocean. Nagapattinam was one of the regions severely affected in Tamil Nadu, accounting for 6,064 of the 8,009 casualties in the state, predominantly from the fishing community who resided close to the seashore. The damage impacted the fishing industry, as most of the boats were damaged by the inundation. The immediate aftermath created a lull in tourism.

== Geography ==
The district shares borders with Tiruvarur district of Tamil Nadu and Karaikal district of the union territory Puducherry. The district of Nagapattinam lies on the shores of the Bay of Bengal between latitude 10.7906^{°}N and Longitude 79.8428^{°}E an area of 1,397 square kilometres (539 sq mi). The District capital, Nagapattinam lies on the eastern coast, 350 kilometers down south of the State capital Chennai and of Tiruchirappalli. It has an average elevation of 9 metres (30 ft) above the mean sea level. The district has a coastline of 187 kilometres (116 mi).

Climate data for Nagapattinam, India
Month	Jan	Feb	Mar	Apr	May	Jun	Jul	Aug	Sep	Oct	Nov	Dec	Year
Mean daily maximum °C (°F)	30.85 (87.53)	32.67 (90.81)	36.83 (98.29)	38.72 (101.70)	40.2 (104.4)	38.1 (100.6)	37.07 (98.73)	36.54 (97.77)	37.02 (98.64)	33.67 (92.61)	29.66 (85.39)	29.13 (84.43)	40.2 (104.4)
Mean daily minimum °C (°F)	21.72 (71.10)	22.15 (71.87)	23.37 (74.07)	26.68 (80.02)	27.48 (81.46)	27.17 (80.91)	26.36 (79.45)	25.44 (77.79)	25.17 (77.31)	24.43 (75.97)	29.66 (85.39)	29.13 (84.43)	29.13 (84.43)
Average precipitation mm (inches)	12.2 (0.48)	12.4 (0.49)	—	2 (0.1)	26.5 (1.04)	—	39.5 (1.56)	39 (1.5)	25 (1.0)	85 (3.3)	32.15 (1.27)	46 (1.8)	319.75 (12.59)

== Economy ==
In 2006 the Ministry of Panchayati Raj named Nagapattinam one of the country's 250 most backward districts (out of a total of 640). It is one of the six districts in Tamil Nadu currently receiving funds from the Backward Regions Grant Fund Programme (BRGF).

== Politics ==
District	No.	Constituency	Name	Party	Alliance	Remarks
Nagapattinam	163	Nagapattinam	M. H. Jawahirullah	DMK	SPA	
Nagapattinam	164	Kilvelur (SC)	T. Latha	CPI(M)	LDF	Won as SPA candidate; party switched to TVK+ post-election; outside support to TVK government
Nagapattinam	165	Vedaranyam	O. S. Manian	AIADMK	NDA	Opposed TVK

== Demographics ==
Historical population
Year	Pop.	±% p.a.
1901	652,643	—
1911	688,101	+0.53%
1921	674,234	−0.20%
1931	693,484	+0.28%
1941	745,006	+0.72%
1951	863,674	+1.49%
1961	954,318	+1.00%
1971	1,087,429	+1.31%
1981	1,234,441	+1.28%
1991	1,377,601	+1.10%
2001	1,488,839	+0.78%
2011	1,616,450	+0.83%

According to the 2011 census, Nagapattinam district had a population of 698,094 with a sex-ratio of 1,025 females for every 1,000 males, much above the national average of 929. 26.94% of the population lived in urban areas. A total of 165,245 were under the age of six, constituting 84,335 males and 80,910 females. Scheduled Castes and Scheduled Tribes accounted for 30.51% and 0.23% of the population respectively. The average literacy of the district was 75.04%, compared to the national average of 72.99%. The district had a total of 413,837 households. There were a total of 671,994 workers, comprising 54,329 cultivators, 216,353 main agricultural labourers, 7,925 in household industries, 207,721 other workers, 185,666 marginal workers, 13,153 marginal cultivators, 128,704 marginal agricultural labourers, 3,630 marginal workers in household industries and 40,179 other marginal workers. The birth rate on a scale of one thousand in rural areas of the district is 19.9, urban is 17.8 and the combined birth rate is 18.85. The death rate on a scale of one thousand in rural areas of the district is 8.2, urban is 6.7 and the combined rate is 7.45. Tamil is the predominant language, spoken by 99.56% of the population.

Religions in Nagapattinam district (2011)
Religion	Percent
Hinduism	88.13%
Islam	8.95%
Christianity	2.70%
Other or not stated	0.22%

== Education ==
There are a total of 891 elementary schools, 185 middle schools, 83 high schools and 79 higher secondary schools in the district.

== Administration ==
The Collector is the administrative head of each district and is the principle representative of the government for the district. The Collector's main responsibilities include revenue administration, Executive Magistracy, maintaining law and order, licensing and regulatory functions, disaster management, civil supplies, public distribution, social welfare, excise, transport, mining, labour laws, elections, legal affairs, census, general administration, treasury management and co-ordination with various departments of the state and central governments. The Collector is also the head of various committees formed at the district level for the various central and state government schemes.

There are 32 districts in Tamil Nadu, each divided for revenue administration purposes into revenue divisions, which are further divided into Talukas. Each of these Talukas has a list of revenue villages and is headed by a Tahsildar. Developmental administration of the district is carried out by Panchayat Unions (or Town Panchayats) in rural areas. These panchayat unions have a set of panchayat villages under them. In urban areas, the governance is done by municipal corporations, municipalities or town panchayats based on the size of the town; each of these has a set of wards. The functions of the municipality are devolved into six departments: general administration/personnel, Engineering, Revenue, Public Health, Town Planning, and Information Technology (IT). The municipalities are administered by a Municipal Commissioner, who is the executive head. The legislative powers are vested in a body of elected members from each ward of the municipality. The legislative body is headed by an elected Chairperson assisted by a Deputy Chairperson.

Nagapattinam District was formerly a part of Thanjavur District. The district boundary is shared by Tiruvarur, Karaikal, Tanjore and Cuddalore districts. Its population at the 2001 Census was nearly 1.5 million. The district has seven taluks, eleven administrative blocks, eight town panchayats, and four municipalities. Five of the talukas are coastal, and all are named after their main towns, which are their administrative centres. From north to south, they are Nagapattinam, Kilvelur, Thirukkuvalai (non-coastal), and Vedaranyam. It is bordered on the east by the Bay of Bengal and on the south by the Palk Strait. On the coast between Tharamgambadi and Nagapattinam lies the small district of Karaikal, an enclave belonging administratively to the Puducherry Union Territory. This is the only district in Tamil Nadu to be formed out of two disjoint regions. The district headquarters, Nagapattinam, is located in the southern part which is less populated than the northern one.

== Politics ==
Member of Parliament
Nagapattinam	M. Selvarasu
Members of Legislative Assembly
Nagapattinam	Aloor Shanavas
Kilvelur (SC)	P. Mahalingam
Vedaranyam	O. S. Maniyan

The district has two Lok Sabha constituencies, namely Nagapattinam Lok Sabha constituency. The current Member of Parliament from the Nagapattinam constituency is M. Selvarasu from the CPI.

There are a total of three legislative assembly constituencies in the district, namely, Kilvelur, Nagapattinam and Vedaranyam. Out of these Kilvelu constituencies is reserved for Scheduled Caste (SC).

== Culture and tourism ==
Tourism plays a key economic role for the town even though fishing is the major occupation.

Kayarohanaswami Temple, a Hindu temple dedicated to Shiva, is located in Nagapattinam. The temple has been in existence from the 6th century CE and has been revered by the verses of Tevaram, the 7th–8th century Saiva canonical work by Appar, Sambandar and Sundarar. The temple is one of the seven temples of the Thyagaraja cult, classified as Saptha Vidangam, where the deity Thyagaraja is believed to portray different dance styles. The temple is also known for the shrine of Neelayadakshi, the consort of Kayarohanaswami.

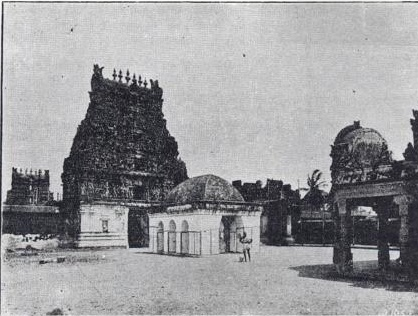
Kayarohanaswami Temple – one of the oldest temples in the town

Soundararajaperumal Temple is a Hindu temple in Nagapattinam dedicated to Vishnu. It is one of the Divya Desams, the 108 temples of Vishnu revered in Nalayira Divya Prabandham by the Tirumangai Alvar, one of the 12 poet saints called Alwars of the 6th–9th century. The other prominent Hindu temples in the district are Sikkal Singaravelan Temple at Sikkal, Vedaranyeswarar Temple at Vedaranyam, Ettukudi Murugan Temple and Koothanur Maha Saraswathi Temple.

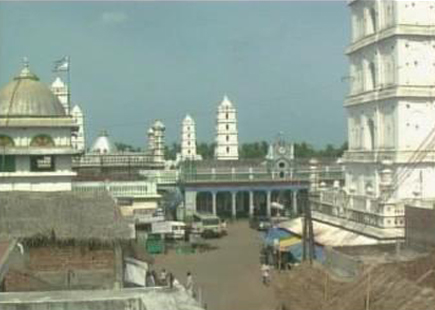
Nagore Dargah, built in the 16th century is one of the major landmarks of the town

Nagore Dargah, a 16th-century minaret located in Nagore, is an important pilgrimage centre of the town. The Kanduri festival is a 14-day event celebrated for the anniversary) of the saint Hazrat Shahul Hamid (1490–1579 CE), for whom the minaret was built. The festival is celebrated in commemoration of the anniversary of the saint's death, and pilgrims from various religions participate in the rituals and rites. The festival is also seen as a sacred exchange between Hindus and Muslims expressing solidarity of mixed faith in the region. It is believed that 60 percent of the shrines were built by Hindus and historically the minaret has many domestic and international visitors. There are three other prominent mosques; one near Nagai Pudhur Road, one near the new bus stand and another at Moolakadai Street.

Velankanni is a pilgrimage centre located 10 km (6.2 mi) from Nagapattinam. The town is known for the Basilica of Our Lady of Good Health, a Roman Catholic church built during the 17th century. Pilgrimage to the basilica is common during September when people of many faiths, especially Hindus, Muslims and Christians of all denominations visit the basilica.

== See also ==
- Kilvelur
- Nagore
- List of districts of Tamil Nadu
- Perumangalam
- Thirukadaiyur
- Thopputhurai
- Vanavanmahadevi
- Valivalam
- vedaranyam
- velankanni
- Voimedu
