= Brahmapureeswarar Temple, Thirukkuvalai =

Brahmapureeswarar Temple
- Tirukolili
- Location in Tamil Nadu

Religion
- Affiliation: Hinduism
- District: Nagapattinam
- Deity: Brahmapureeswarar
- Festival: Maha Shivaratri
- Features: Tower: Five-tiered

Location
- Location: Thirukkuvalai
- State: Tamil Nadu
- Country: India
- Coordinates: 10.6314°N 79.7203°E

Architecture
- Type: Dravidian architecture

Specifications
- Temple: One
- Inscriptions: Found
- Elevation: 35.6 m (117 ft)

Brahmapureeswarar Temple or Thirukolili is a Hindu temple dedicated to Shiva located in Thirukkuvalai in Nagapattinam district of Tamil Nadu, India. Shiva is worshiped as Brahmapureeswarar, and is represented by the lingam and his consort Parvati is depicted as Vandamar Poonguzhali. The presiding deity is revered in the 7th-century-CE Tamil Saiva canonical work, the Tevaram, written by Tamil poet saints known as the nayanars and classified as Paadal Petra Sthalam.

There are many inscriptions associated with the temple indicating contributions from Cholas, Thanjavur Nayaks and Thanjavur Maratha kingdom. The oldest parts of the present masonry structure were built during the Chola dynasty in the 9th century CE, while later expansions, are attributed to later periods, up to the Thanjavur Nayaks during the 16th century CE.

The temple house a five-tiered gateway tower known as gopurams. The temple is now maintained and administered by Hindu Religious and Charitable Endowments Department of the Government of Tamil Nadu.

== Legend ==
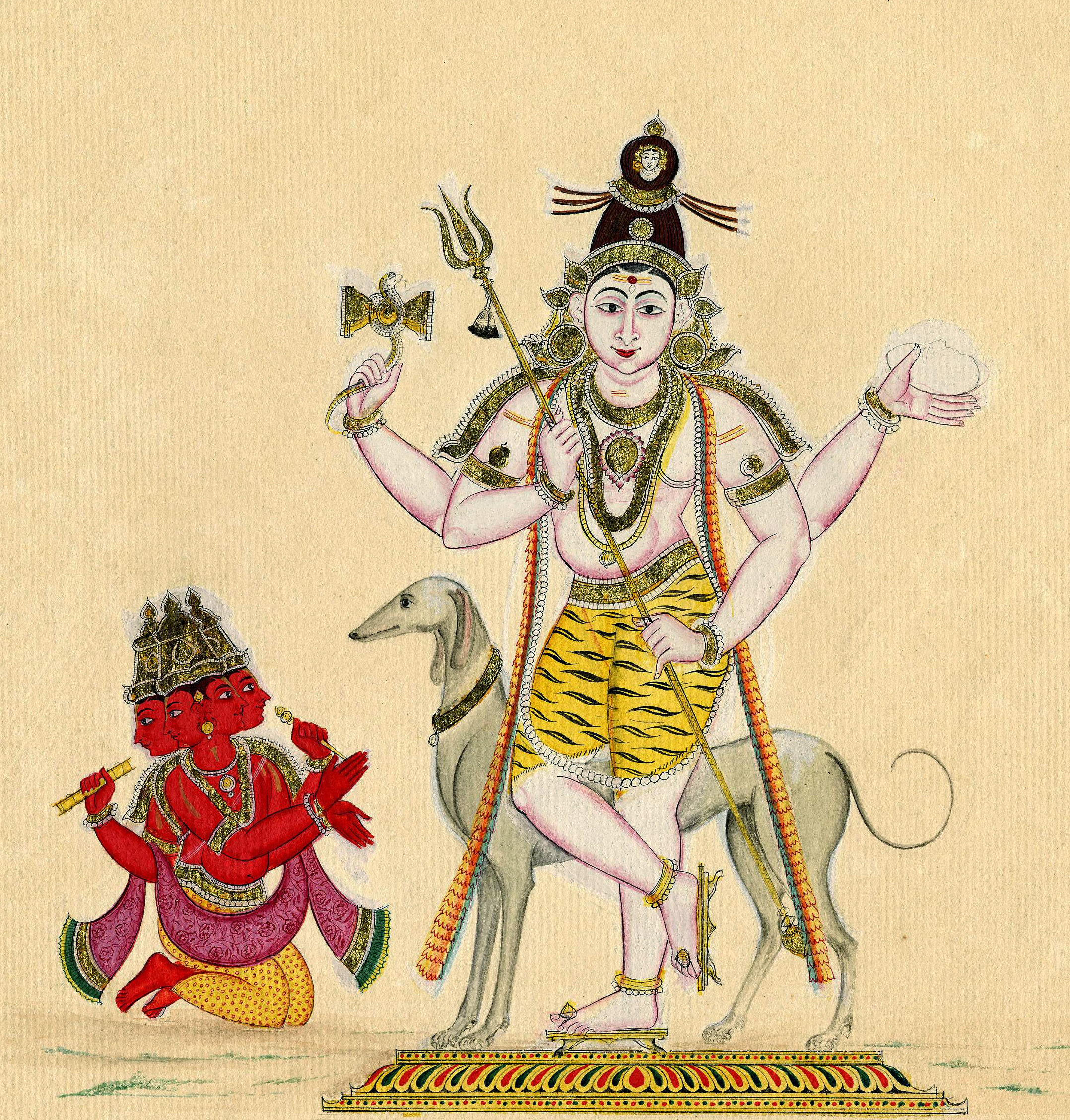
Image of Brahma praying to Shiva

One old man of Kundaiyur near Tirukkuvalai hearing of Sundaramurthi Nayanar's greatness was supplying him with paddy and dhol, when owing to adversity of season being unable to contribute the stipulated quantity prayed to God. Sundarar sung praying the deity here in favour of the old man and wanted to shift the paddy to Thiruvarur. Shiva was pleased by his devotion and sent the footgrains to his house in Thiruvarur. As per Hindu legend, the image of Shiva, in the form of lingam was made with white sand by Brahma which gave the name Brahmapureeswarar. Navagrahas, the nine planetary deities are believed to have worshipped Shiva to absolve themselves of the sins committed. The place got the name Thirukolili from kol (planet) which got relief from sins ili. Following the legend, the images of the Navagrahas is located in a single line in the temple. Thyagarajar is called Avani Vidangar and is believed to perform Bringa Natanam. During later period, the place came to be known as Thirukolili. As per another legend, during Mahabharatha, Bheema the Pandava prince was propitiated off his sins of killing Bakasura by worshipping the presiding deity. Sage Agastya was also believed to have worshipped the presiding deity. The temple has various other names like Brahmapothavanam, Kathakaranyam, Pushapavanam, Thenkailai and Pandavapuram.

== History ==
There are 19 inscriptions in the temple. As per the inscription, the temple was part of Rajendra Chola Valanadu Ilayalanadu Vendalai Vellorekotram. A devotee named Irulkudian Indrapathinallur Uyyavandhan Jayathundangan commissioned the Mahamandapam and contributed to the renovation till the end of the temple. There were multiple contributions from Jatavarman Sundara Pandyan I. The inscriptions refer to the presiding deity as "Thirukoili Utaya Nayanar" and Tyagesar as "Avanivitankar Tykar". The northern street is referred as "Thirumaraikadan Thiruveethi". During Pandya times, there were Saivite Brahmins belonging to Kani Udayar. During the 18th regnal year of Sadayavarman Sundara Pandiyan, 800 gold coins were donated to the temple. The region was called Rajendra Chola Valanadu Vandarai Velakotram as Thirukolili. The temple is now maintained and administered by Dharmapuram Adheenam, a Saivite monastic institution.

== Processional Dance ==
The Thyagarajar Temple at Tiruvarur is famous for the ajapa thanam(dance without chanting), that is executed by the deity itself. According to legend, a Chola king named Mucukunta obtained a boon from Indra(a celestial deity) and wished to receive an image of Thyagaraja Swamy(presiding deity, Shiva in the temple) reposing on the chest of reclining Lord Vishnu. Indra tried to misguide the king and had six other images made, but the king chose the right image at Tiruvarur. The other six images were installed in Thirukkuvalai, Nagapattinam, Tirukarayil, Tirukolili, Thirukkuvalai and Tirumaraikadu. All the seven places are villages situated in the river Cauvery delta. All seven Thyagaraja images are said to dance when taken in procession (it is the bearers of the processional deity who actually dance). The temples with dance styles are regarded as Saptha Vidangam(seven dance moves) and the related temples are as under:

Temple	Vidangar Temple	Dance pose	Meaning
Thyagarajar Temple	Vidhividangar	Ajabathaanam	Dance without chanting, resembling the dance of Sri Thyagaraja resting on Lord Vishnu's chest
Dharbaranyeswarar Temple	Nagaradangar	Unmathanathaanam	Dance of an intoxicated person
Kayarohanaswamy Temple	Sundaravidangar	Vilathithaanam	Dancing like waves of sea
Kannayariamudayar Temple	Adhividangar	Kukunathaanam	Dancing like a cock
Brahmapureeswarar Temple	Avanividangar	Brunganathaanam	Dancing like a bee that hovers over a flower
Vaimoornaathar Temple	Nallavidangar	Kamalanaanathaanam	Dance like lotus that moves in a breeze
Vedaranyeswarar Temple	Bhuvanivividangar	Hamsapthanathaanam	Dancing with the gait of a swan

== Architecture ==
The temple is located 15 km away from Thiruvarur. The temple has a five tiered Rajagopuram with elevated stone walls separating the second and third precincts. The images of the presiding deity, Brahmapureswarar, in the form of Shiva lingam occupies the main sanctum facing east. The shrine of the consort of Brahmapureeswarar, Vadar Poonguzhali faces west. The third prakaram has a separate shrine for the Saivite saints. The temple has three water bodies located at various places inside the temple. There is an image of Vinayagar in the third precinct who is believed to have shown the path of heaven to a king named Hemakantha, giving the name, Hemakantha Vinayagar. The temple tank, Brahma Theertham, is considered sacred and is located opposite to the temple tank. The shrine of Avanivitangar in the form of Somaskanda is a shrine parallel to the sanctum and has almost the same size as the sanctum. The image of Sundarar with Paravainachiyar is located in the shrine of Somaskandar. The temple has an emerald lingam, which is located inside the sanctum. There are three images of Chandikeswara in the temple. The halls leading to the sactum has pillars with sculptures indicating various legends associated with the temple.

== Literary mention ==
The temple is revered in the verses of Tevaram, the 7th century Saivite canonical work by the three saint poets, namely, Appar, Sambandar and Sundarar. As the temple is revered in Tevaram, it is classified as Paadal Petra Sthalam, one of the 275 temples that find mention in the Saiva canon.
