= Vedaranyeswarar Temple =

Hindu temple of Shiva in Vedaranyam, India

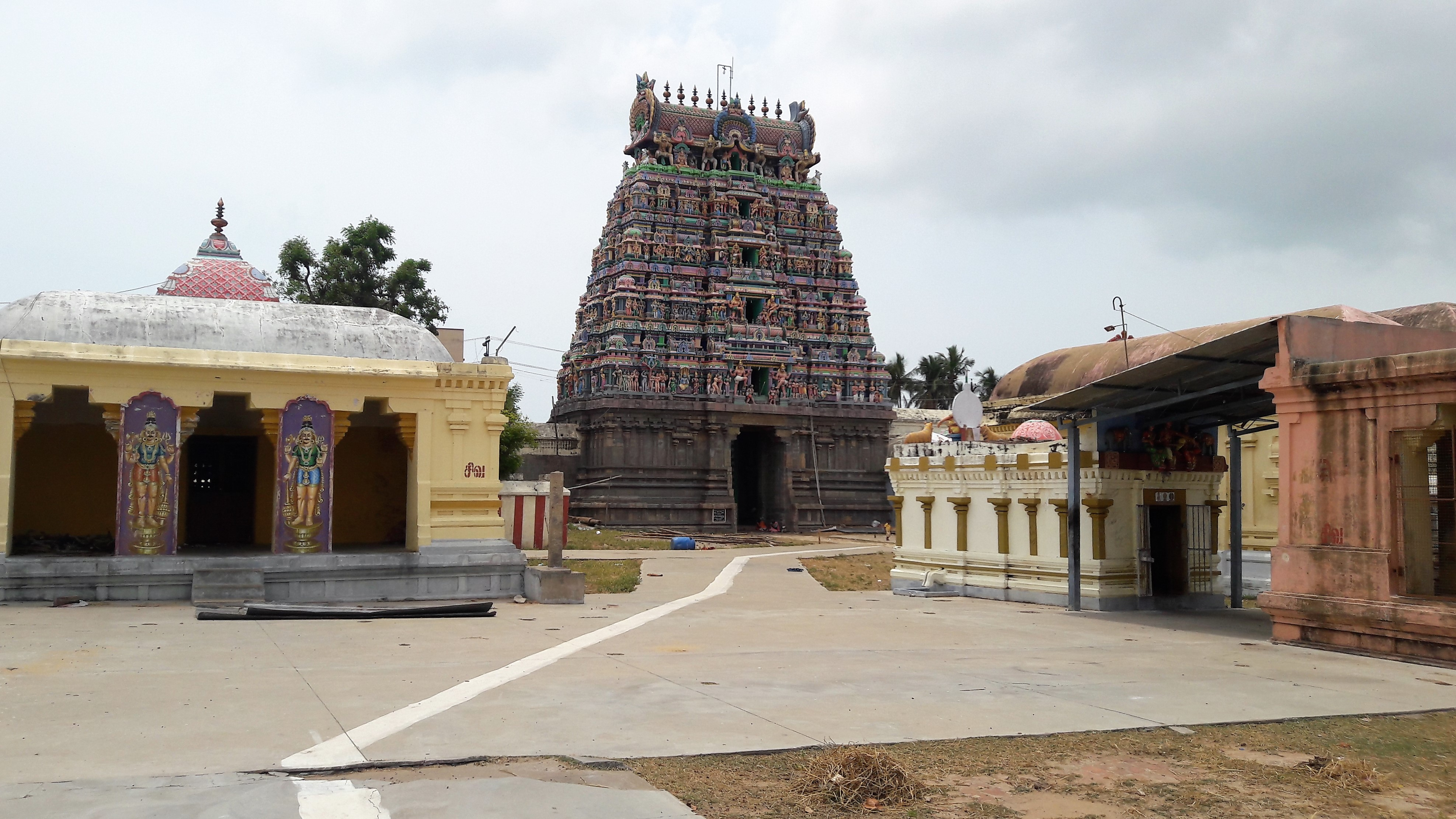
- Image of the Vedaranyam temple gopuram

- Location in Tamil Nadu

Religion
- Affiliation: Hinduism
- District: Nagapattinam
- Deity: Vedaranyeswarar (Shiva)

Location
- Location: Vedaranyam
- State: Tamil Nadu
- Country: India
- Coordinates: 10°22′N 79°51′E

Architecture
- Type: Dravidian architecture

Vedaranyeswarar Temple is a Hindu temple dedicated to the god Shiva, located in the town of Vedaranyam in Tamil Nadu, India. Vedaranyeswarar is revered in the 7th-century-CE Tamil Shaiva canonical work, the Tevaram, written by Tamil saint poets known as the Nayanars and classified as Paadal Petra Sthalam. It is the only temple to have found mention in all the seven Thirumurais. The temple is famed for the legend between the saints Appar and Sambandar when the former sang to open the door while the latter sang to close the door.

== Etymology and legend ==
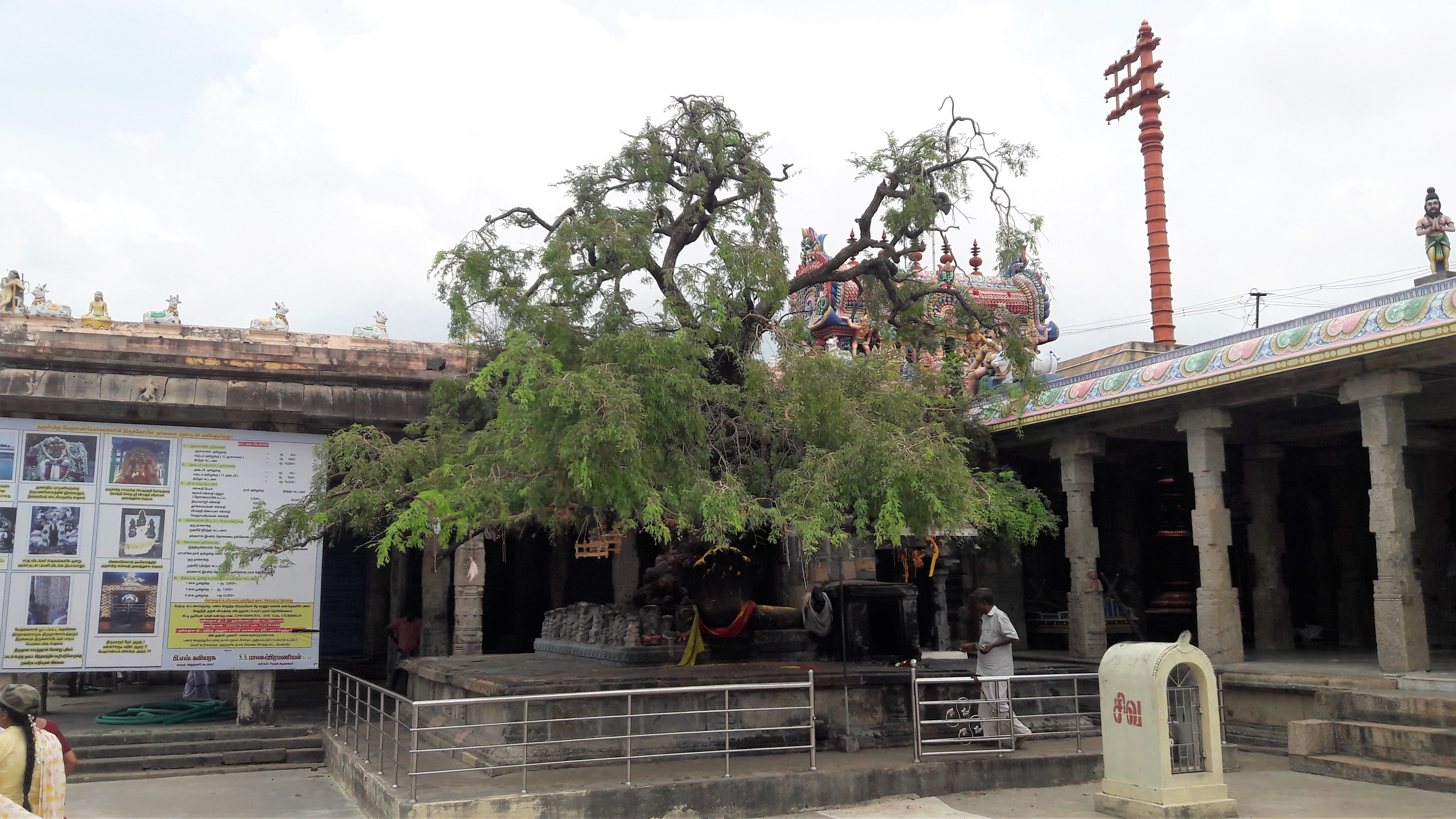
Shrine inside the temple

The town Vedaranyam is named after Vedaranyeswarar, the presiding deity of the Vedaranyeswarar Temple, a Hindu temple dedicated to Shiva. The place was earlier known as "Tirumaraikadu", meaning the place where Vedas, oldest scriptures of Hinduism, originated. The 7th-century-CE Shaiva canonical work Tevaram by Appar and Tirugnanasambandar mentions the place as "Tirumaraikadu". As per Hindu legend, the Vedas worshipped Shiva in this place, giving the name "Vedaranyam" to the place. According to another Hindu legend, Rama, the seventh avatar of god Vishnu, is believed to have visited Vedaranyam to absolve himself from the sins committed in the war against the Illangai King Ravana. The footprints of Rama is preserved in a place called Ramar Padam near Vedaranyam. According to a Tamil legend, the Vedas locked the gates of the temple after worshiping Shiva. It is believed that sage Agastya witnessed the marriage between Shiva and Parvathi from this temple. As per another legend, a rat in the lamp tickled a ghee lamp, thus expanding the spread of light. Shiva blessed the rat and it was born as king Mahabali in its next birth. The Asvanis Nachiketa and Svetaketu performed tapas in this place.

== History ==
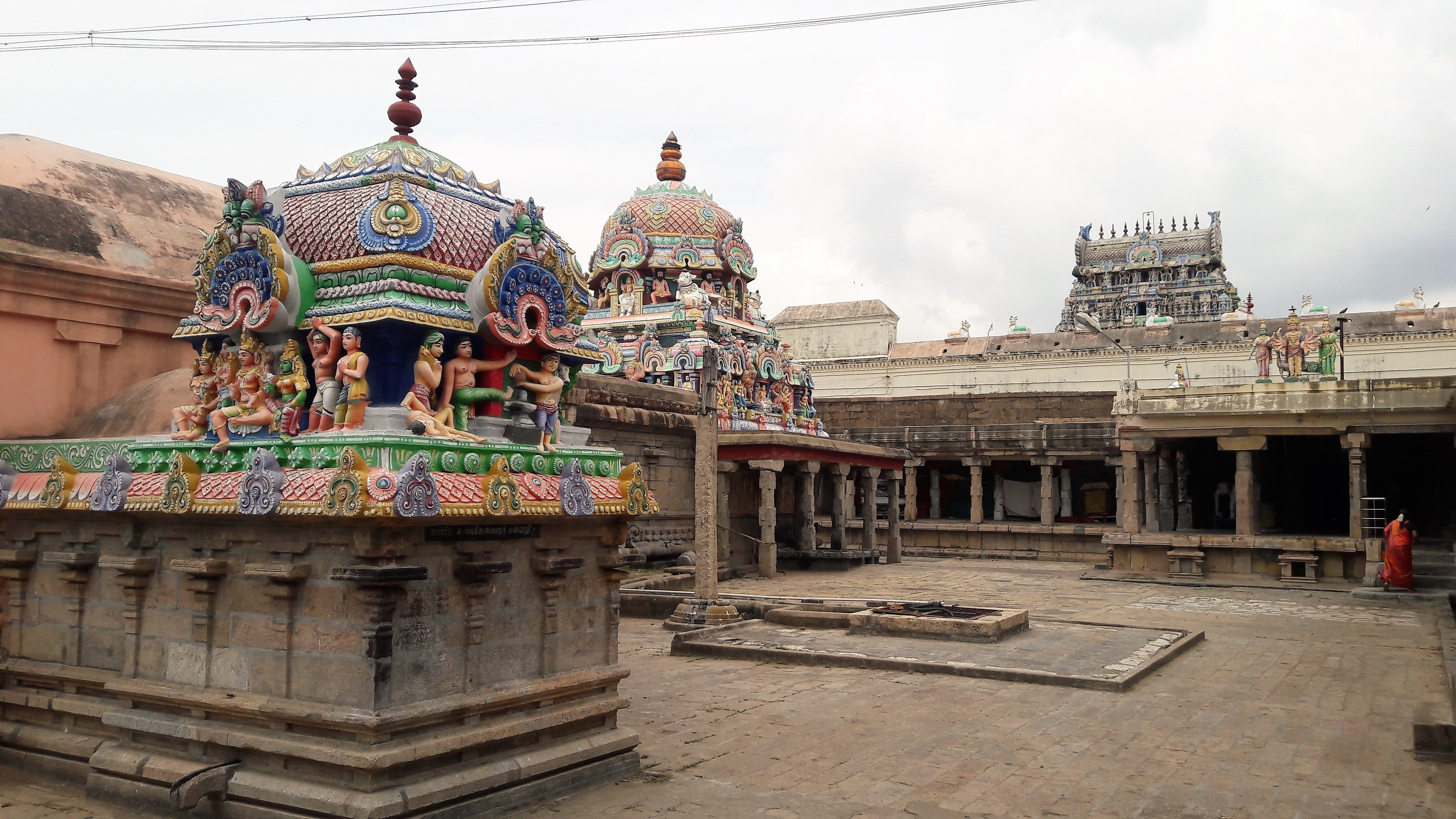
Shrine inside the temple

The recorded history of Vedaranyam is found from the inscriptions in Vedaranyeswarar Temple. The inscriptions are recorded by the Madras Epigraphical department during 1904. There are a total of 88 recorded inscriptions named from 415 of 1904 to 503 of 1904. The inscriptions date from the reign of Aditya Chola (871–907 CE), Rajaraja Chola I (985–1014 CE), Rajendra Chola I (1012–1044 CE) and Kulothunga Chola I (1070–1120 CE) indicating various grants to the temple. Paranjothi Munivar, a 13th-century saint, who wrote the book Thiruvilaiyadal Puranam, was born at Vedaranyam. An inscription dating back to Parantaka Chola mentions the gift of 90 sheep by a merchant to the temple for the maintenance of a perpetual lamp.

Vedaranyam continued to be a part of the Chola Empire and the Chola region emerged as a centre of Saivism during the reign of Kulothunga Chola I (1070–1120 CE). After the fall of Cholas during the reign of Rajendra Chola II in the 13th century CE, the erstwhile Chola region was caught under a power struggle between Pandyas and Hoysalas. The royal patronage continued to the temple during the rule of the Nayaks. The Negapatam region (modern day Nagapattinam district) was briefly captured by French troops led by Lally (1702–66 CE) in 1759 CE. The Tanjore district was annexed by British after the French failed to subdue the king of Tanjore. In modern times, the temple is maintained and administered by the Hindu Religious and Endowment Board of the Government of Tamil Nadu.

== Architecture ==
The temple houses an emerald image of lingam, locally called Maragatha lingam. Vedaranyeswarar temple complex has three prakarams (outer courtyard) and two five-tiered rajagopuram (gateway tower) both on the western & eastern directions. The temple houses a tank named Manikarnika on the Western entrance inside the temple complex. The central shrine faces east and holds the image of Vedaranyeswarar (Shiva) in the form of lingam made of granite. The granite images of the deities Ganesha (son of Shiva and god of wisdom), Murugan (son of Shiva and god of war), Nandi (the bull and vehicle of Shiva) and Navagraha (nine planetary deities) are located in the hall leading to the sanctum. As in other Shiva temples of Tamil Nadu, the first precinct or the walls around the sanctum of Vedaranyeswarar has images of Dakshinamurthy (Shiva as the Teacher), Durga (warrior-goddess) and Chandikeswarar (a saint and devotee of Shiva). The second precinct is surrounded by granite walls. The inner sanctum houses the image of the 63 nayanars. There are also images of Ramanatha linga, Shanmugha, Jvaradeva, Saraswati, Sanisvara, Annapurni, Durga, Nataraja, Bhairava, Surya and Chandra. Unlike other temples, the images of Navagraha are found in a row. The images of Durga and Vanadurga are unique representations of the deities.

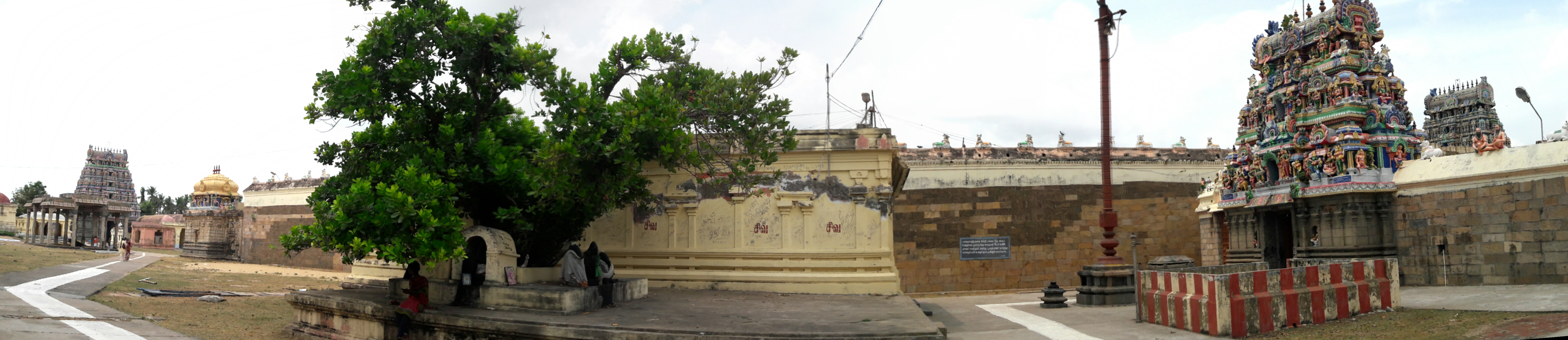
Panoramic view of the temple

== Processional dance ==
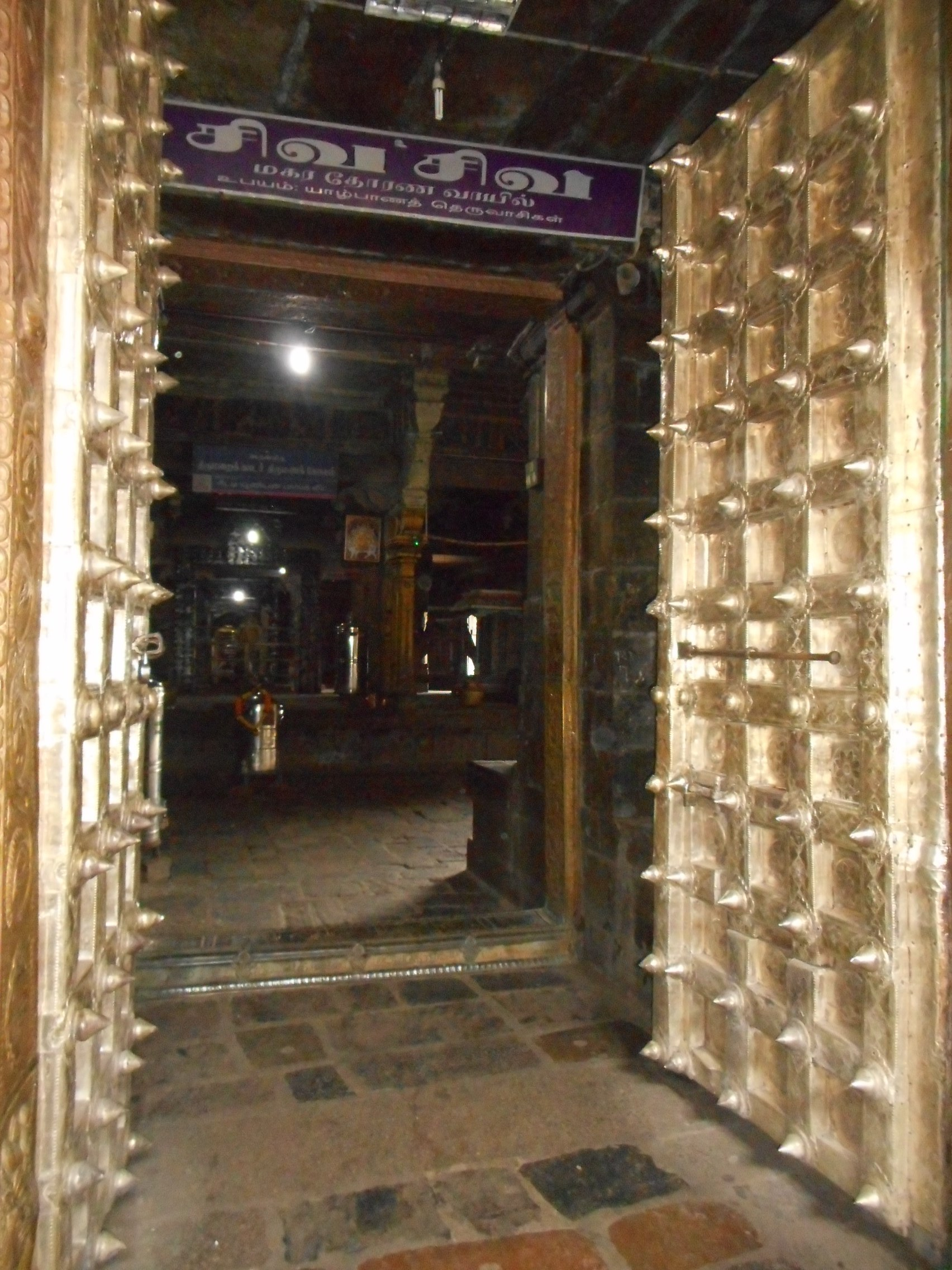
Entrance of the temple

The Thyagarajar Temple at Tiruvarur is known for the ajapa thanam (dance without chanting). According to legend, a Chola king named Mucukunta obtained a boon from Indra (a celestial deity) and wished to receive an image of Thyagaraja (presiding deity, Shiva in the temple) reposing on the chest of reclining Vishnu. Indra tried to misguide the king and had six other images made, but the king chose the right image at Tiruvarur. The other six images were installed in Thirukkuvalai, Nagapattinam, Tirukarayil, Tirukolili, Thirukkuvalai and Tirumaraikadu. All the seven places are villages situated in the river Kaveri delta. All seven Thyagaraja images are said to dance when taken in procession(it is the bearers of the processional deity who actually dance). The temples with dance styles are regarded as Saptha Vidangam(seven dance moves). and the related temples are as below:

| Temple | Vidangar Temple | Dance pose | Meaning |
| Thyagarajar Temple | Vidhividangar | Ajabathaanam | Dance without chanting, resembling the dance of Thyagaraja resting on Vishnu's chest |
| Dharbaranyeswarar Temple | Nagaradangar | Unmathanathaanam | Dance of an intoxicated person |
| Kayarohanaswamy Temple | Sundaravidangar | Vilathithaanam | Dancing like waves of sea |
| Kannayariamudayar Temple | Adhividangar | Kukunathaanam | Dancing like a rooster |
| Brahmapureeswarar Temple | Avanividangar | Brunganathaanam | Dancing like a bee that hovers over a flower |
| Vaimoornaathar Temple | Nallavidangar | Kamalanaanathaanam | Dance like lotus that moves in a breeze |
| Vedaranyeswarar Temple | Bhuvanivividangar | Hamsapthanathaanam | Dancing with the gait of a swan |

== Religious importance ==
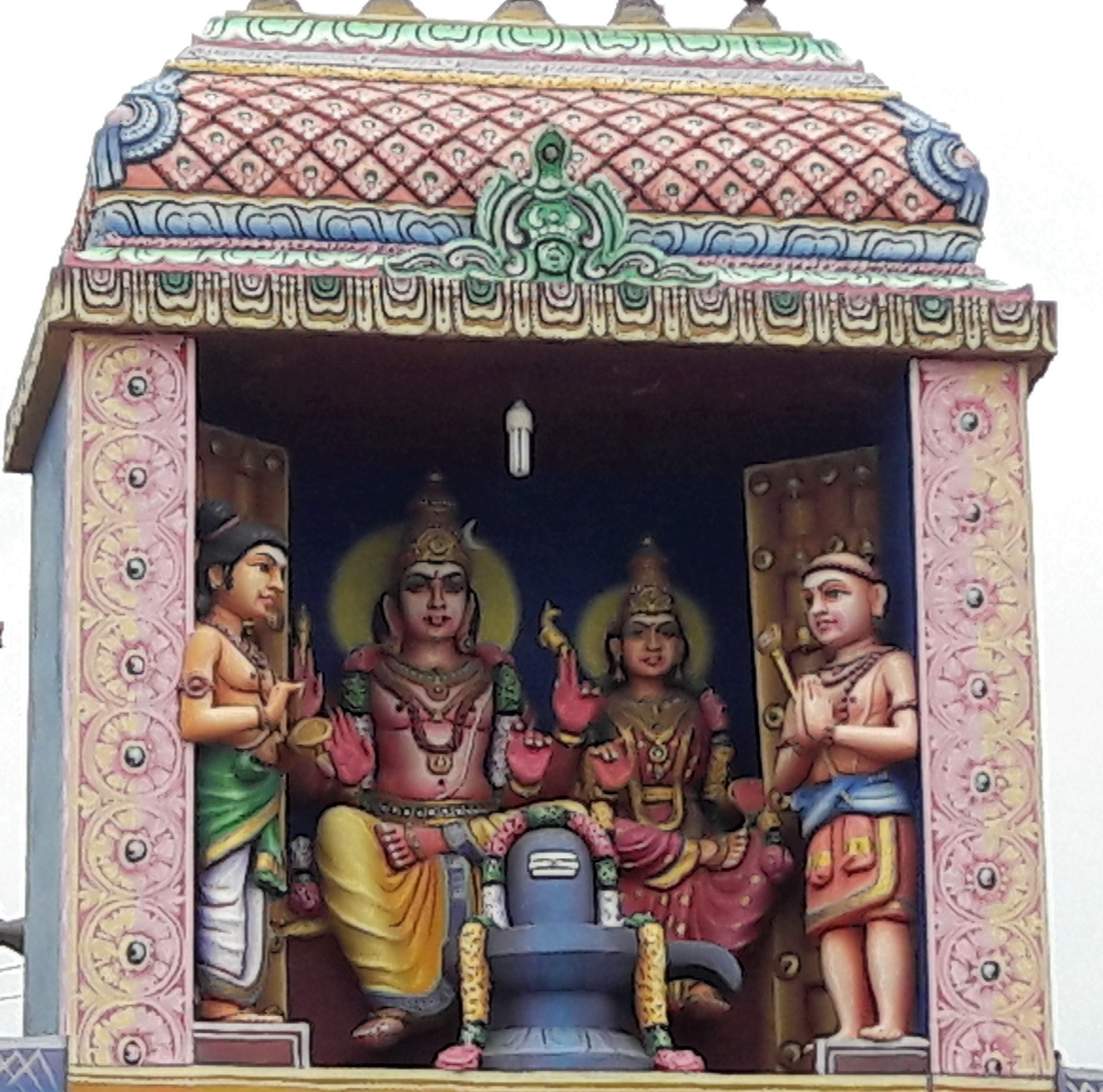
Image of Appar and Sambandandar

The Nayanmars (Shaiva saints) Appar and Tirugnanasambandar could not enter the locked temple. At this, on Tirugnanasambandar's request, Appar sang devotional hymns praising Shiva, after which the gates opened. Tirugnanasambandar's devotional hymns locked the gates again. Vedaranyeswarar is revered in the 7th century Tamil Shaiva canonical work, the Tevaram, written by Tamil saint poets known as the nayanars and classified as Paadal Petra Sthalam. It is the only temple to have found mention in all the seven Thirumurais. The temple is famed for the legend between Appar and Sambandar when the former sang to open the door while the latter sang to close the door. It is believed that Sundarar, another nayanar, visited the temple along with Chera king Cherama Perumal Nayanar. The western entrance of the temple houses the image of elephant god named Virahatte Vinayaga who is believed to have driven away the ghosts killed by Rama. Mahodya Amavasya is a religious occasion occurring every year during the full moon day of Tamil month Thai. During the occasion Mahodaya Snanam, having dip in four water bodies in Vedaranyam, namely the pond close to the temple, Kodiayakarai beach, Vedaranyam sea and finally the Manikarnika Tank inside the temple. During the occasion, hundreds of devotees throng the temple where special rituals are performed.

== Paintings ==
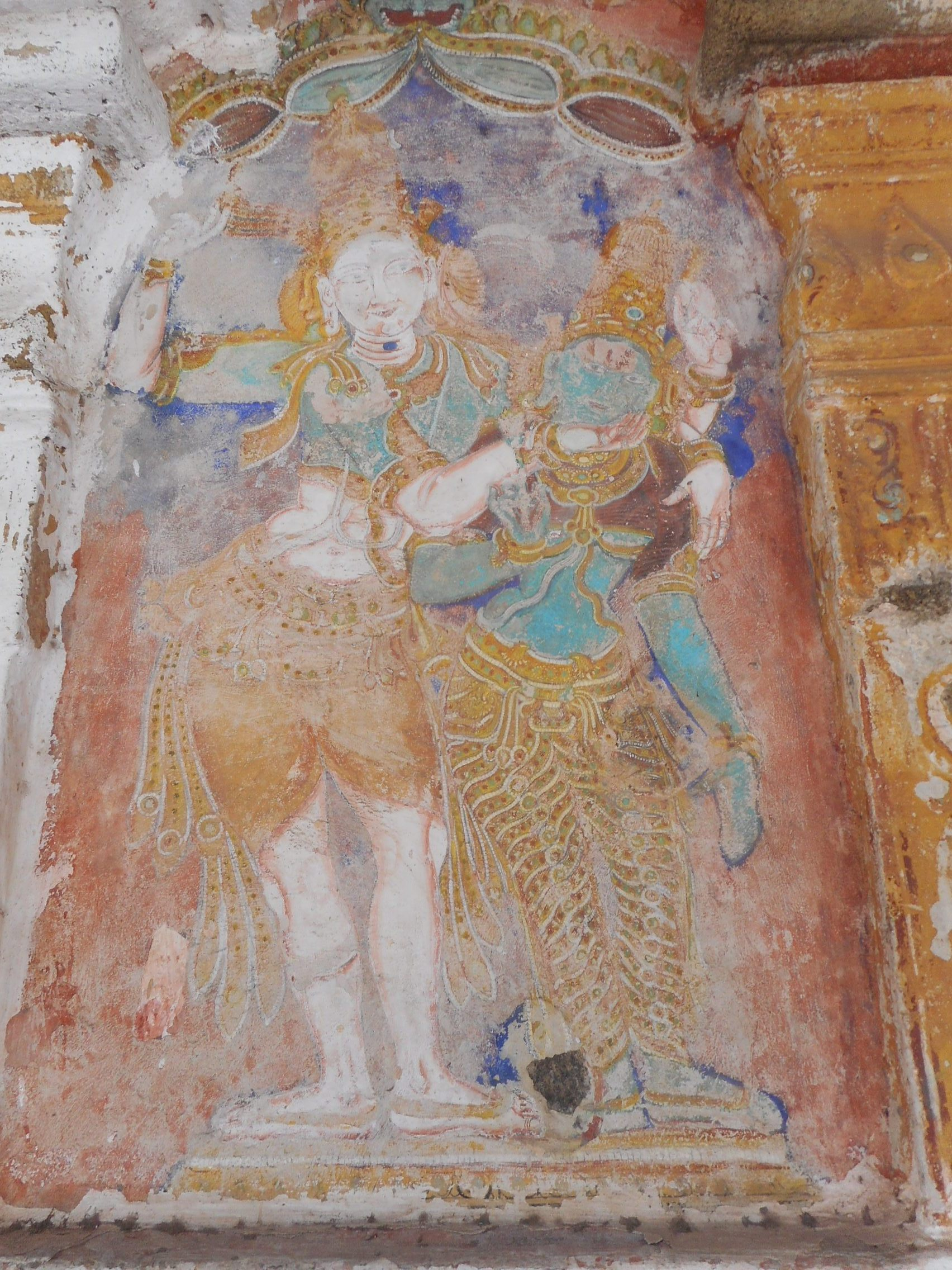
At the rear side of sanctom sanctorum

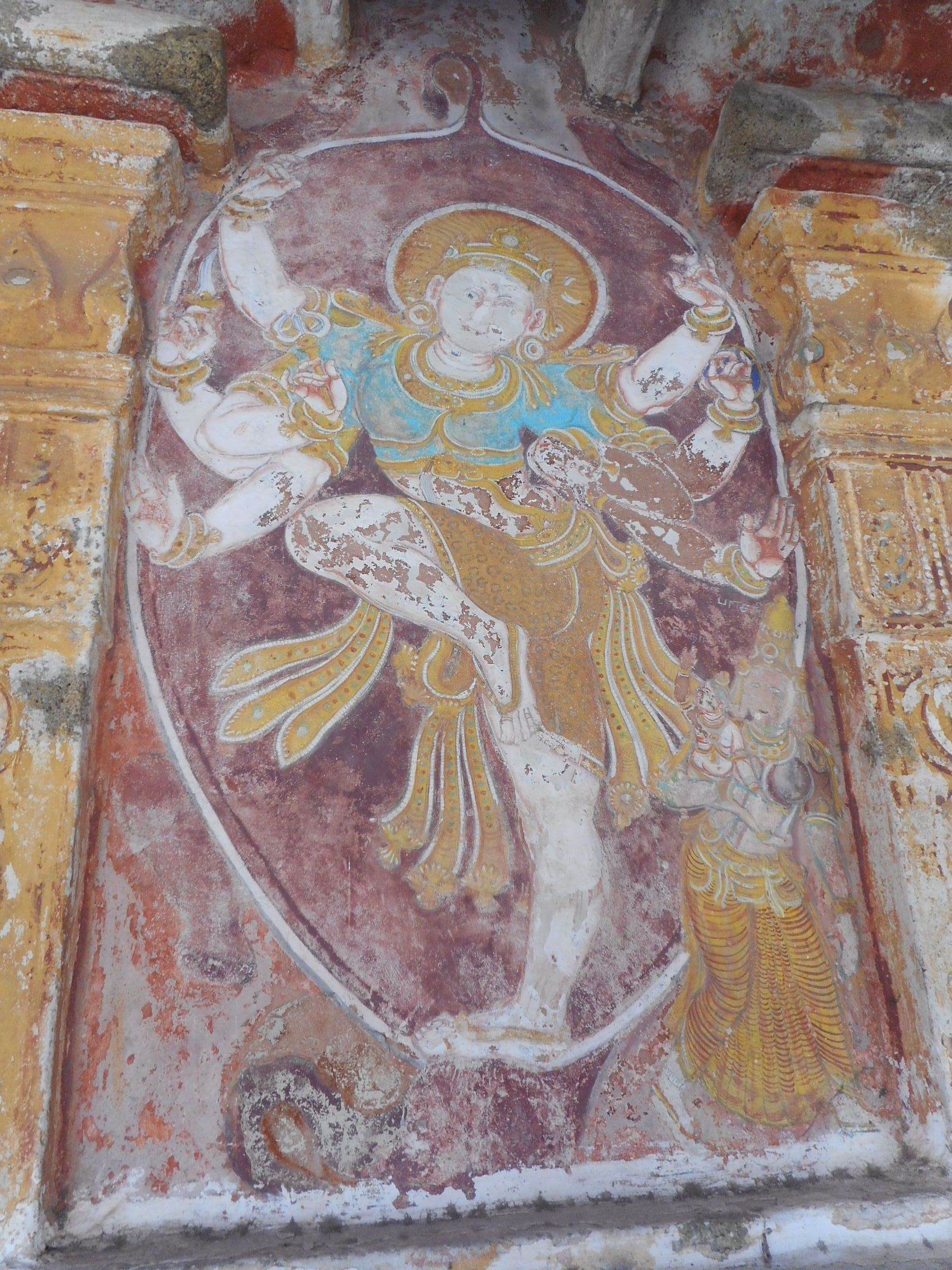
At the rear side of sanctom sanctorum

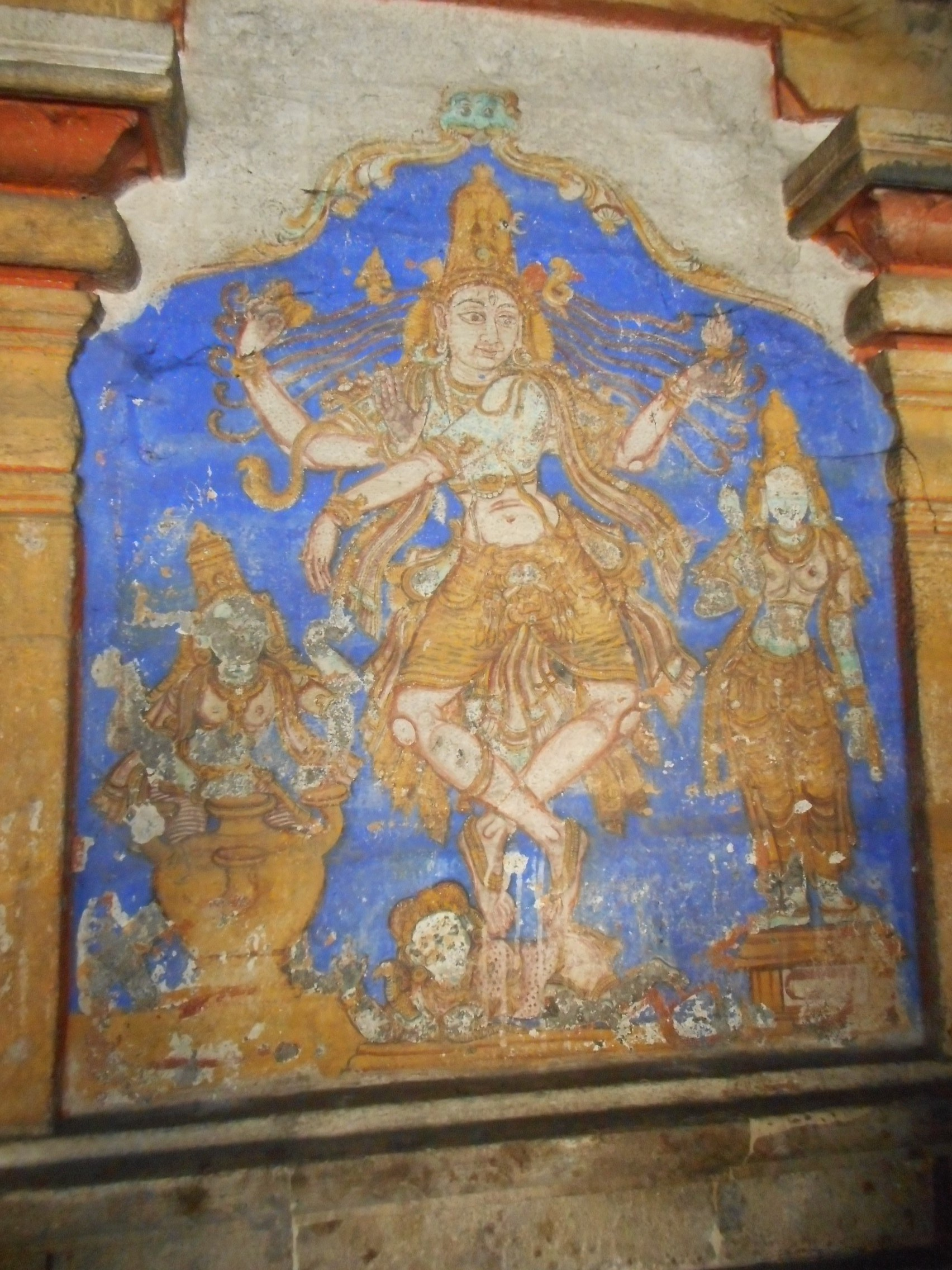
At the rear side of sanctom sanctorum

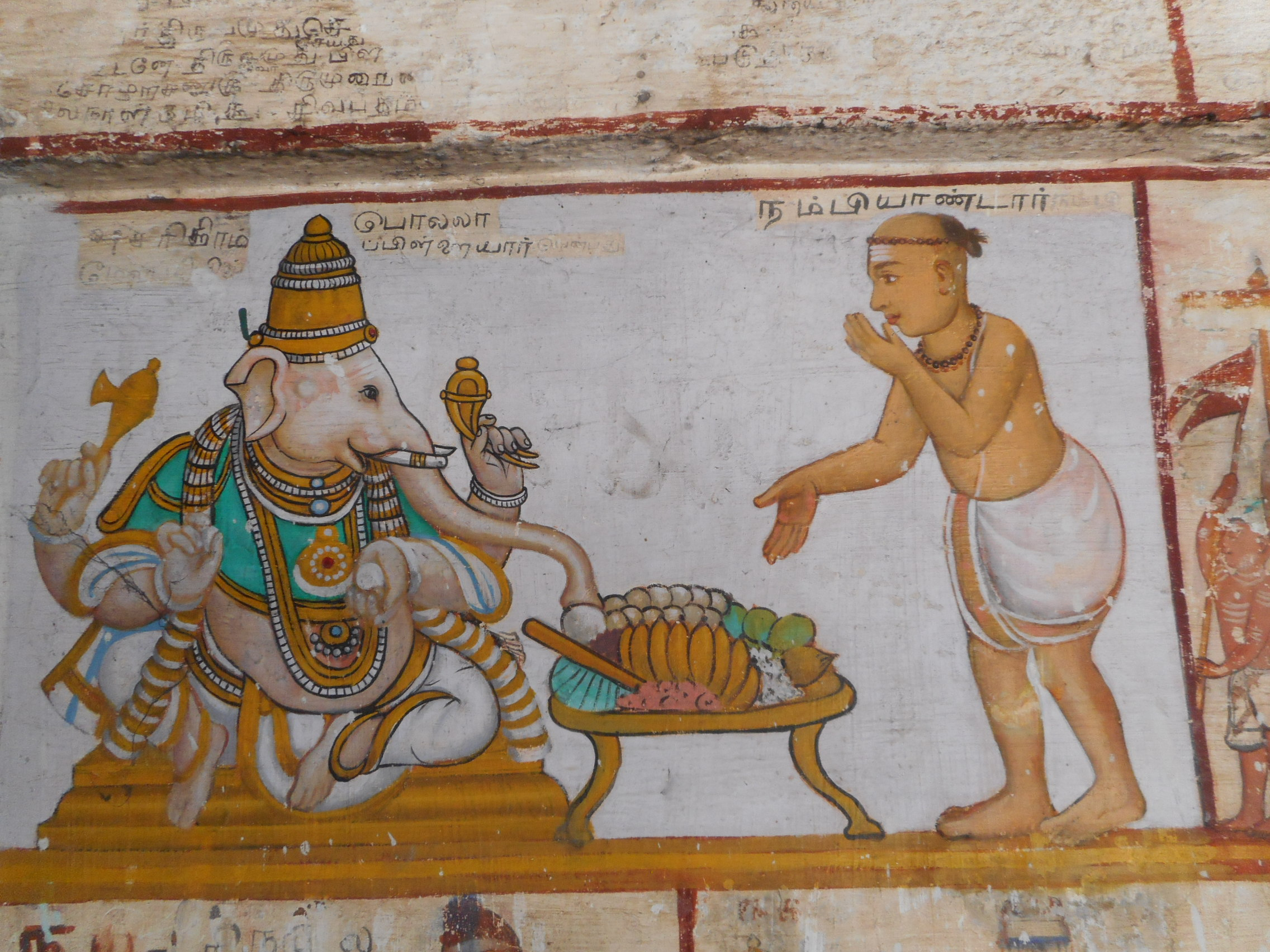
In the prakara

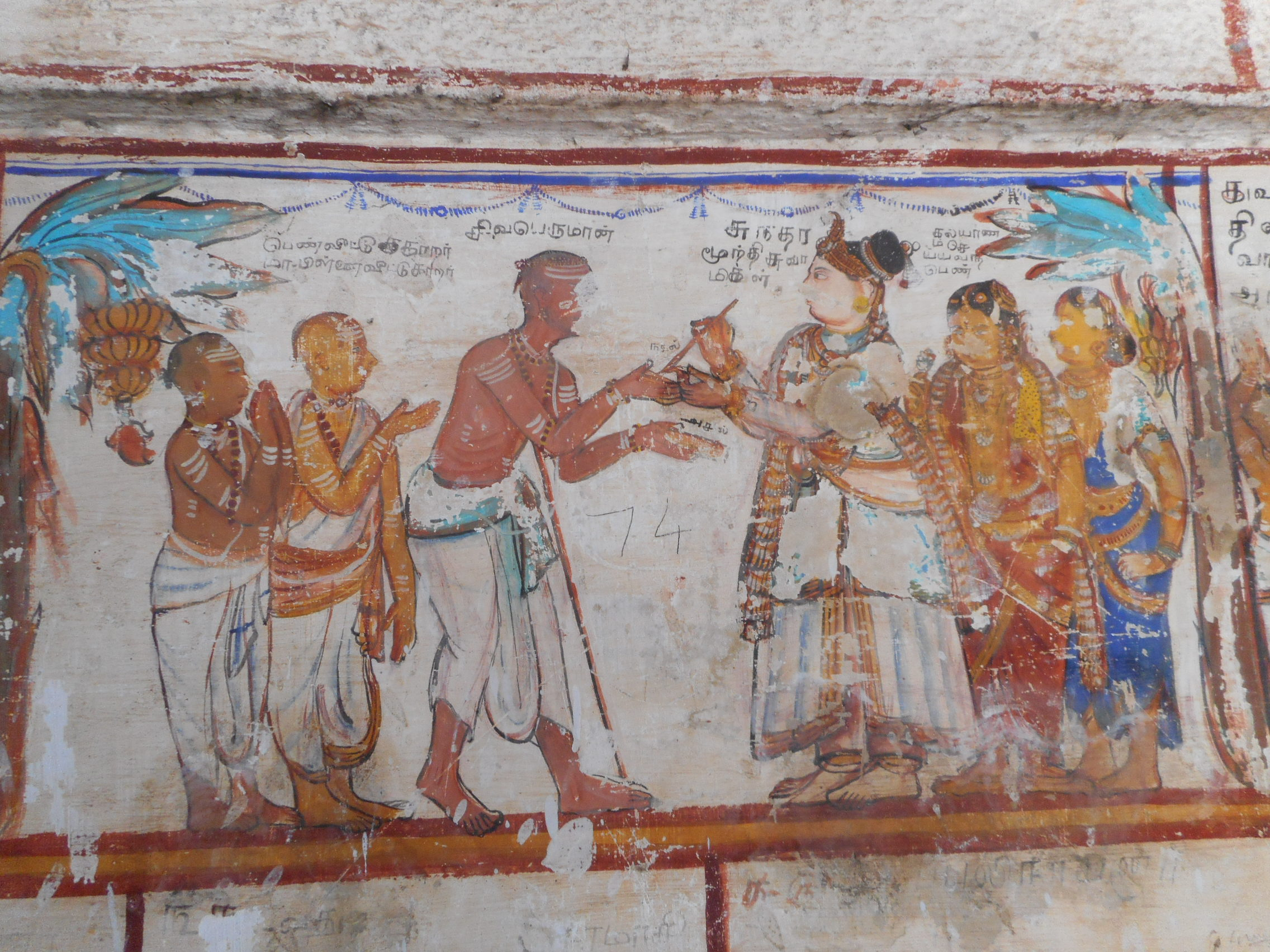
In the prakara

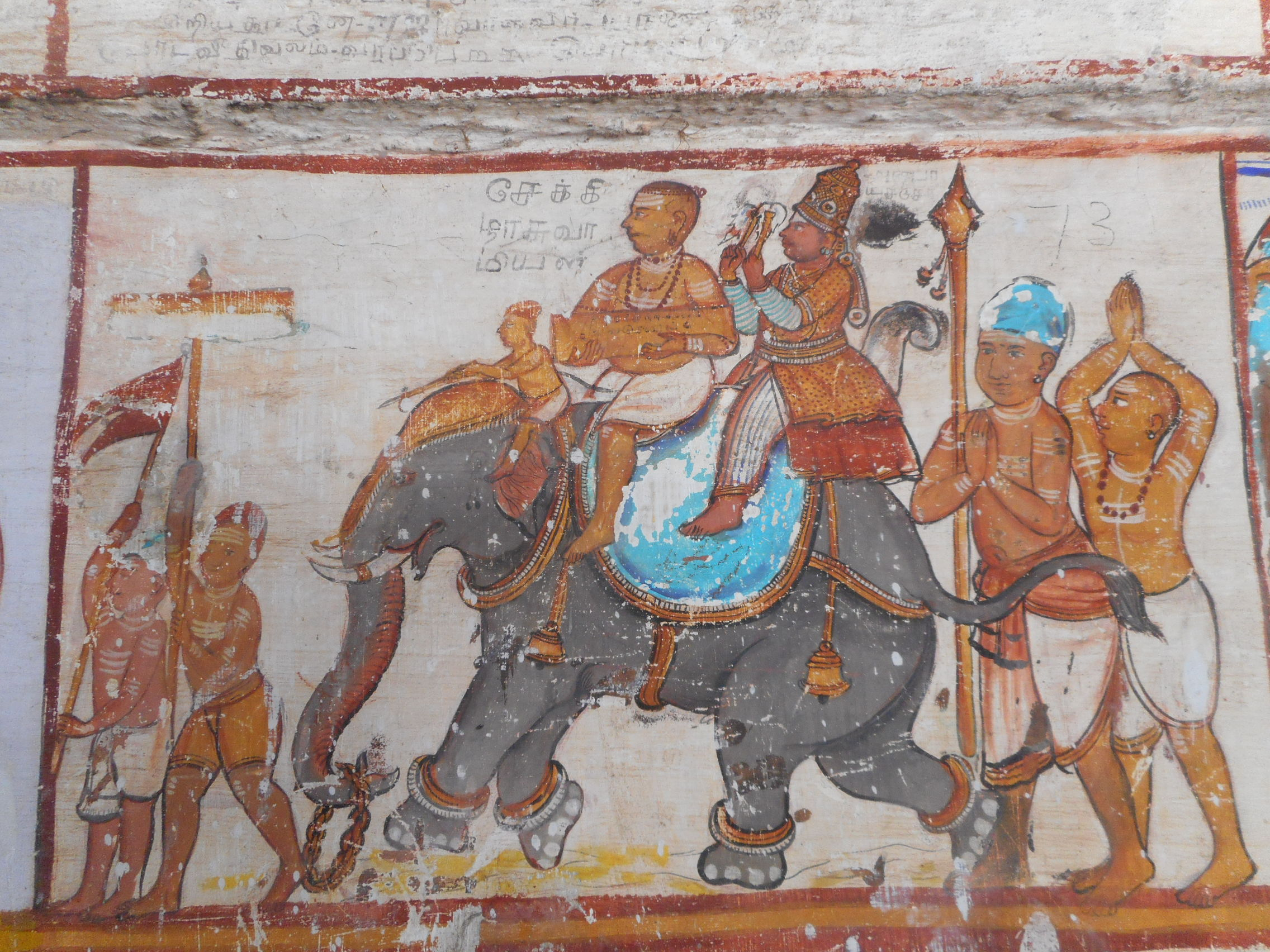
In the prakara
