= Thyagaraja Temple, Tiruvarur =

Temple in Tamil Nadu, India

Thyagaraja Temple
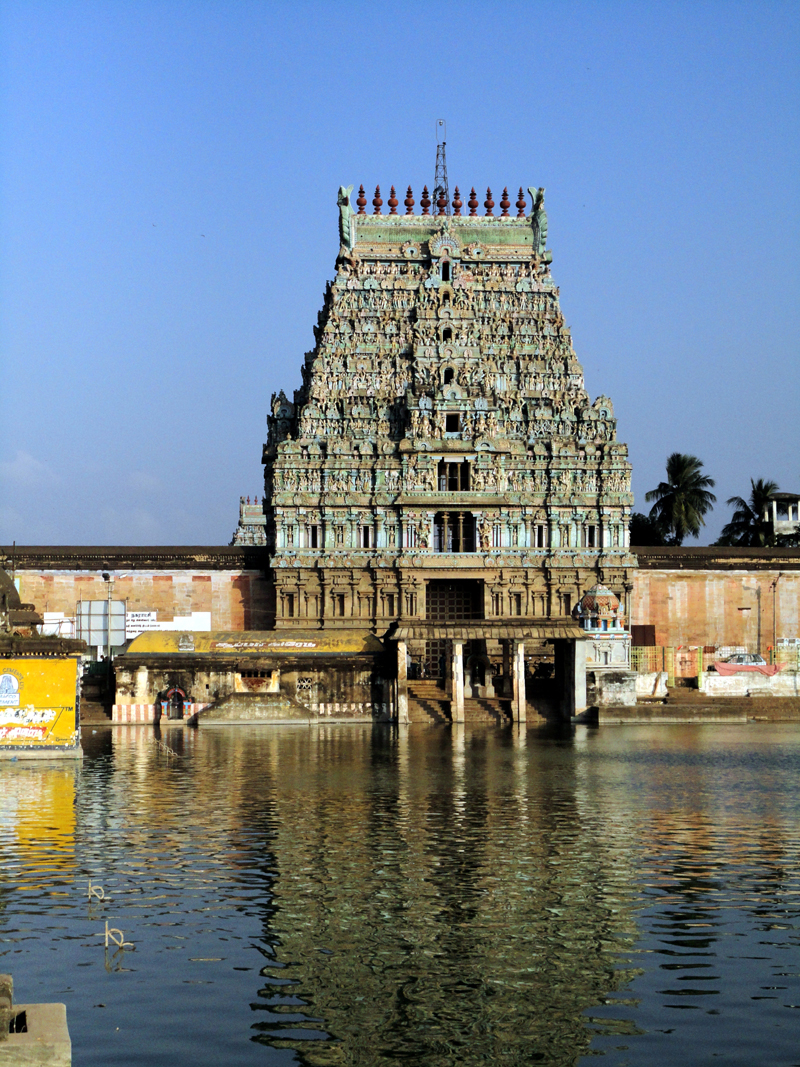
- View of the gopuram (tower)

- Location in Tamil Nadu

Religion
- Affiliation: Hinduism
- District: Tiruvarur
- Deity: Thyagarajaswami (Shiva); Neelotpalambika (Parvati)

Location
- Location: Tiruvarur
- State: Tamil Nadu
- Country: India
- Coordinates: 10.7761°N 79.6335°E

Architecture
- Type: Tamil architecture
- Creator: Chola Dynasty
- Elevation: 36.03 m (118 ft)

Thyagaraja Temple is a Shiva temple in the town of Thiruvarur in Tamil Nadu state, India. Shiva is worshiped in the form of a lingam as Thyagarajaswami, also known as Putridankondar. His consort Parvati is worshipped as Neelotpalambika and also as Kamalambika, whose separate shrine is an important center for Shaktism and Tantra, and is also regarded as one of the Shakti Peethas. The presiding deity is mentioned in the 7th century Shaiva canonical work the Tevaram and the shrine is classified as a Paadal Petra Sthalam.

The temple complex covers 8.1 hectares (20 acres) and is one of the largest temples in India. It houses nine entrance towers known as gopurams. The tallest is the eastern tower, with four stories and a height of 30 metres (98 ft). The temple has numerous shrines, with those of Thyagarajaswami, Neelotpalambika, and Kamalambika being the most prominent.

The masonry structure was built during the Chola dynasty in the 9th century. The temple is maintained and administered by the Hindu Religious and Charitable Endowments Department of the Government of Tamil Nadu.

== Etymology ==
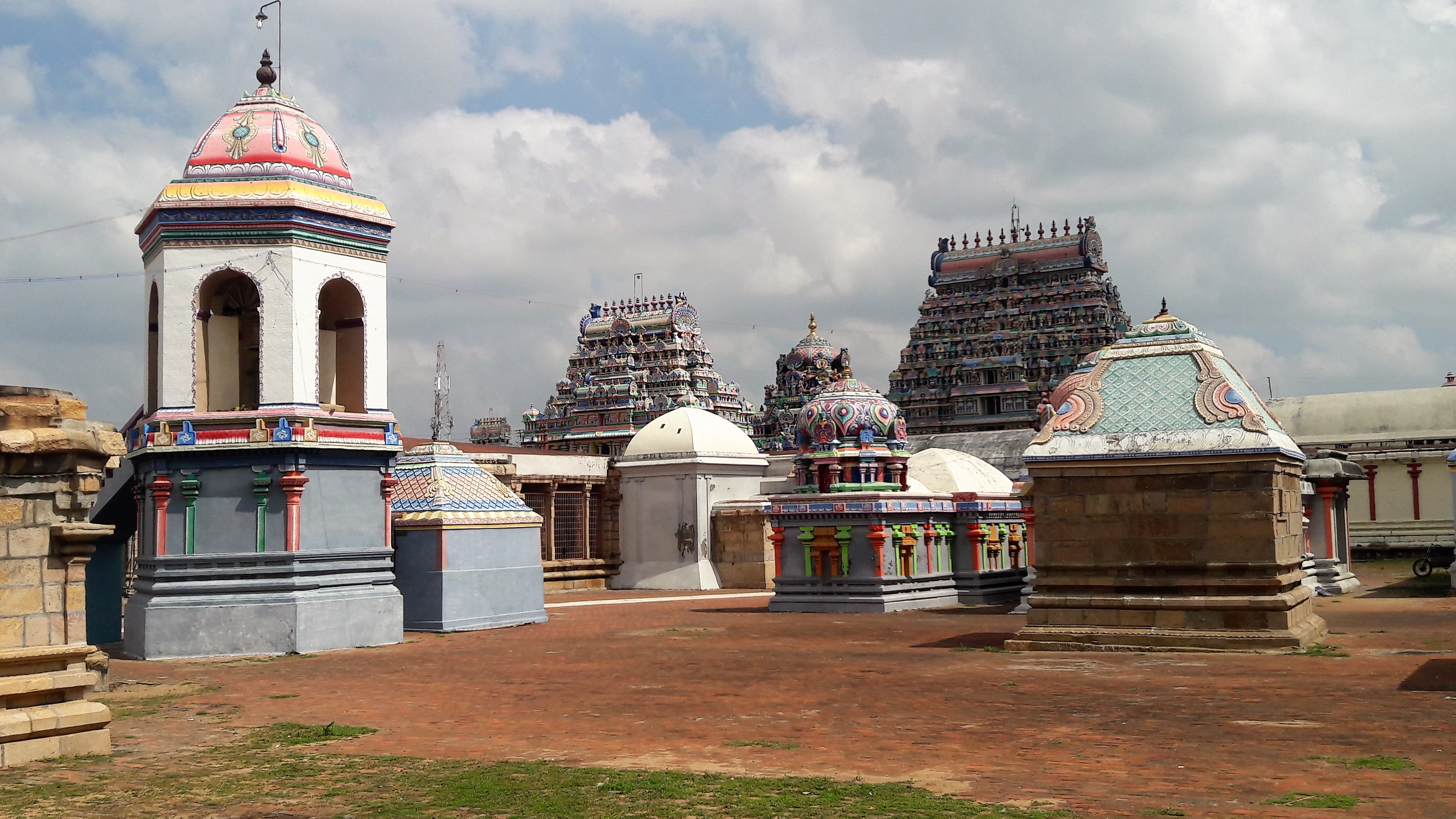
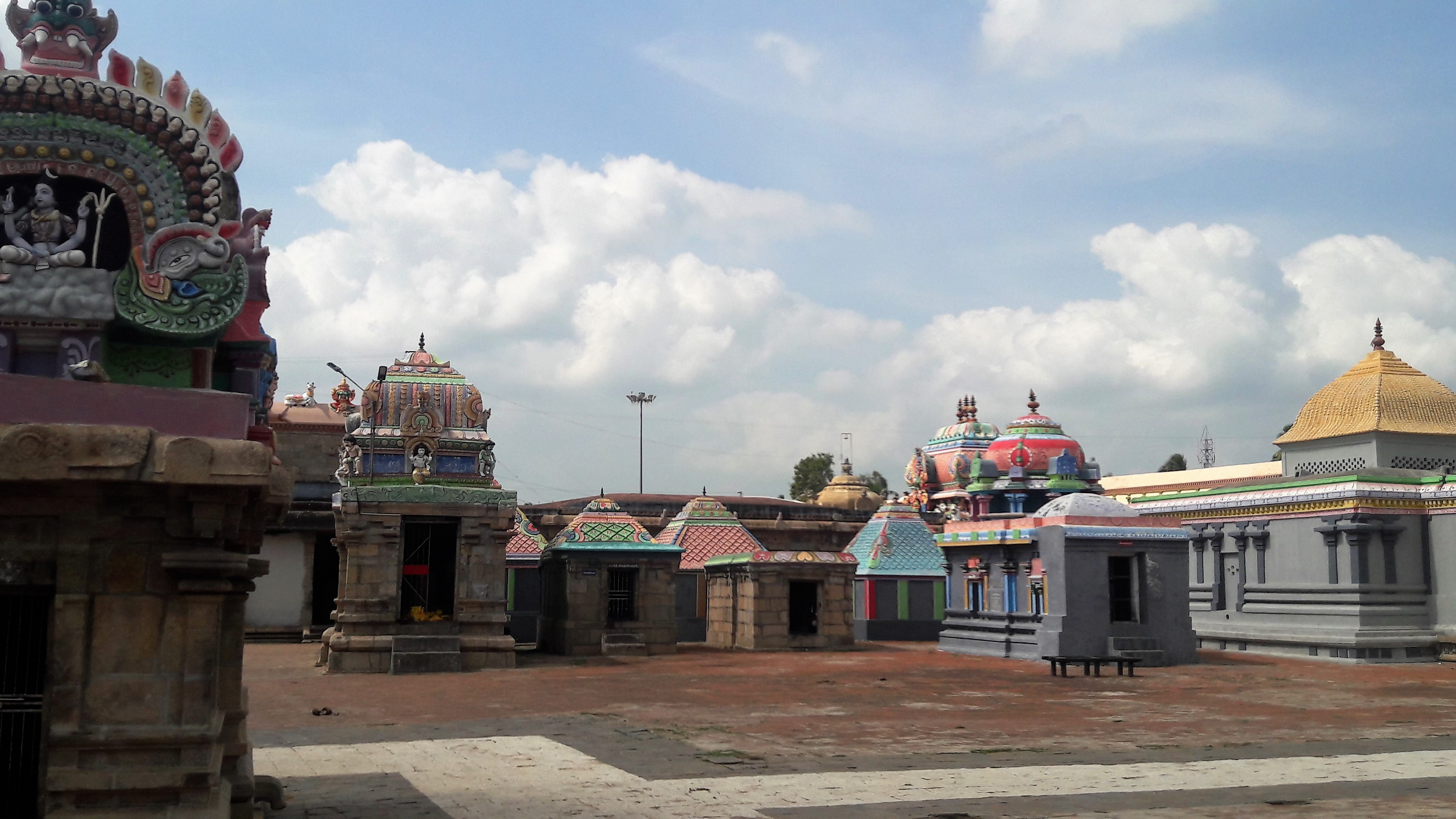
Shrines of the temple

The historic name of Thiruvarur was Arur and it finds mention in the 7th-century Shaiva canonical work, Tevaram. The term Thiru, meaning holy, is added to all temple cities that are mostly revered by the verses of Tevaram, which is the case of Arur becoming Thiruvarur. Another name of Thiruvarur is Kamalalayaksetra, meaning the "holy place that is an abode of lotuses", hence the goddess' name Kamalambika and the Kamalalayam tank; During the British Raj, the town was termed Tiruvalur, Tiruvaloor, and Thiruvalur. As per the district and municipality websites, the district has the spelling "Tiruvarur", while the town has it as "Thiruvarur". As per Hindu legend, the temple is the place where Parvati as Kamalambika, wished to marry Shiva as Thyagarajaswami, but her wish remained unfulfilled.

== History ==
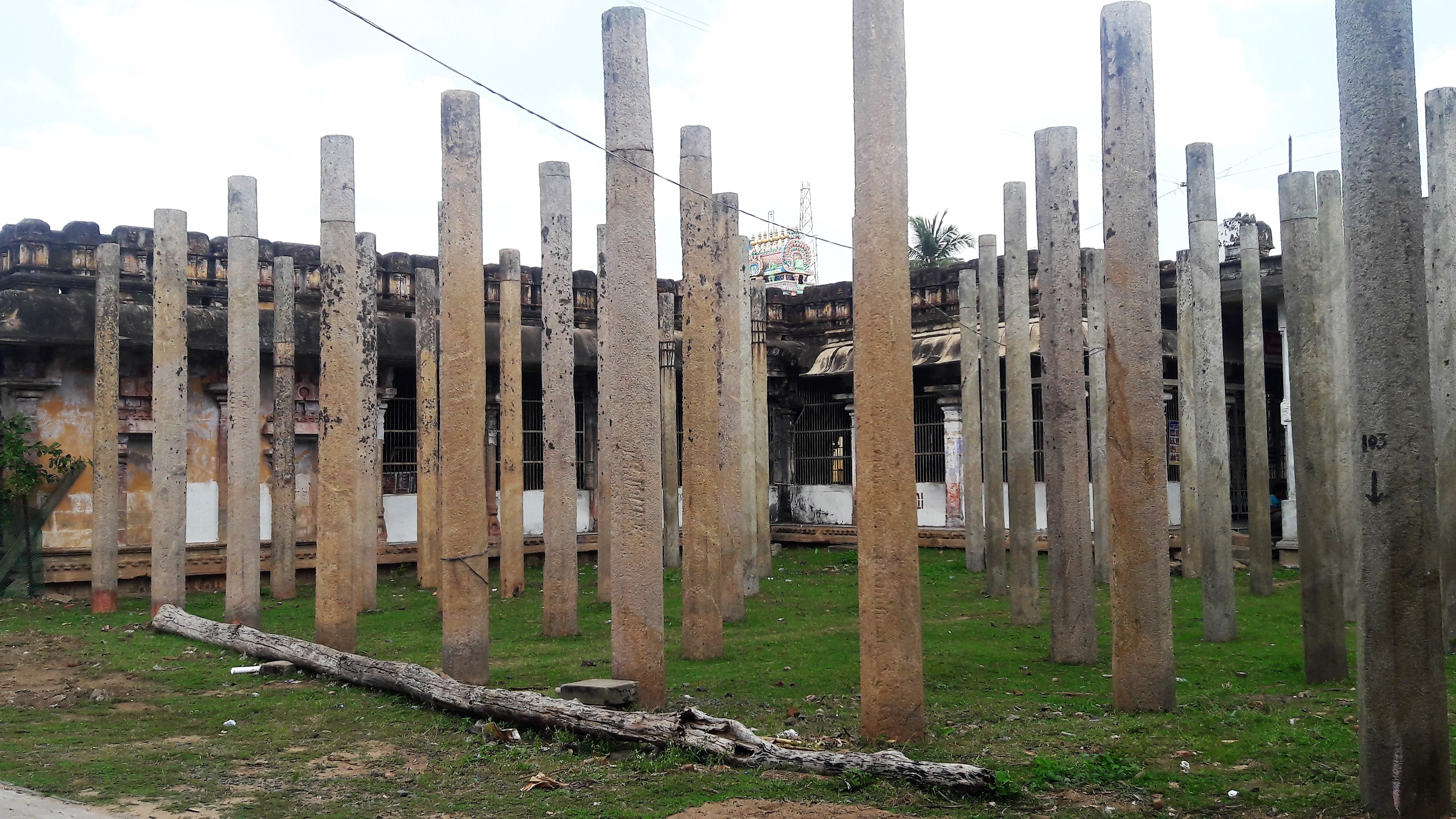
Sundial to view stars

According to legend, a Chola king named Muchukunda obtained a boon from Indra and wished to receive a lingam icon of Shiva, depicting the latter dancing on the chest of Vishnu. Indra tried to misguide the king and had six other images made, but the king chose the right image and consecrated it in Tiruvarur. The Muchukunda Sahasranamam specifically refers to the deity as Anapaayamahipaala, and as Rajaveshadari (one who played the role of a king).

The temple is believed to have been initiated with a large complex by the Pallavas during the 7th century. Contemporary history of the temple dates back to the time of the Medieval Cholas. An inscription dated in the 20th regnal year of Rajendra I (1012–1044) beginning with the introduction "Tirumanni valara" is found on the north and west walls of the Thyagaraja shrine. It gives a list of gifts including a number of jewels and lamps to the deity. It records that the temple was built in stone in the regnal years of the king by Anukkiyar Paravai Nangaiyar. Besides the same lady liberally endowed gold for plating and gilding parts of the vimana, the entrance, and the four sides of the shrine. Copper was also donated for plating the doors, and corbels of the pillars of the mandapa in front of the shrine. This inscription meticulously records the weight of the endowed gold and copper, besides listing the various ornaments gifted to the temple with a description each of them.

The temple complex seems to have acted as the cultural model for the Brihadeeswara Temple in Thanjavur, built by Raja Raja Chola, wherein he enshrined an icon which shared with the icon of the Chidambaram Temple. The last Chola monarch to play an important role in the affairs of the temple was Kulothunga Chola III in the early part of the 13th century A.D. It attracted devotees of all schools and the Golaki Monastery was established in the 13th and 14th centuries. The temple also attracted Jains, which were attacked by Hindus, as is evident from the text Periya Puranam.

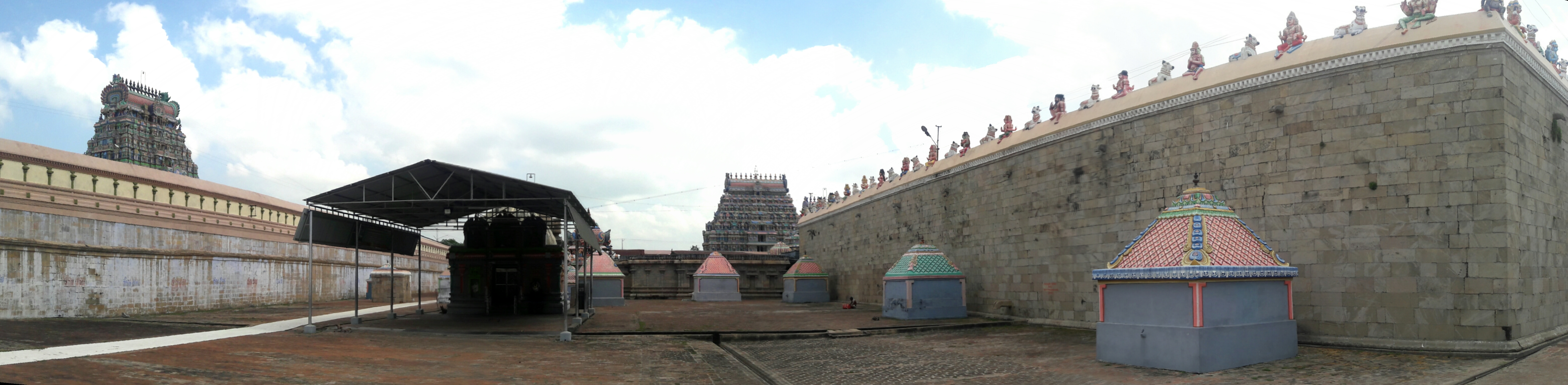
Image of shrines inside the temple

== Architecture ==
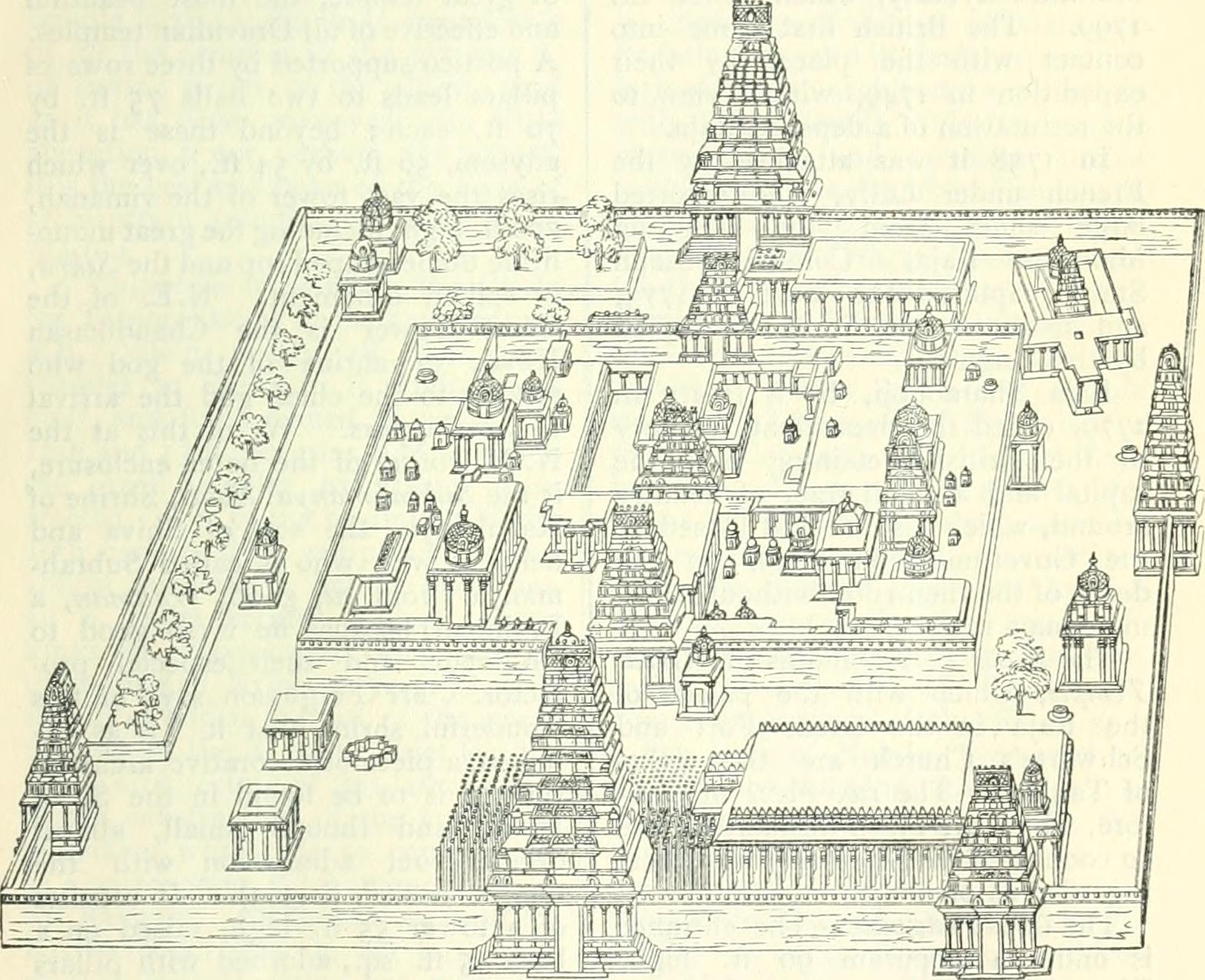
Bird's eye view of the temple complex

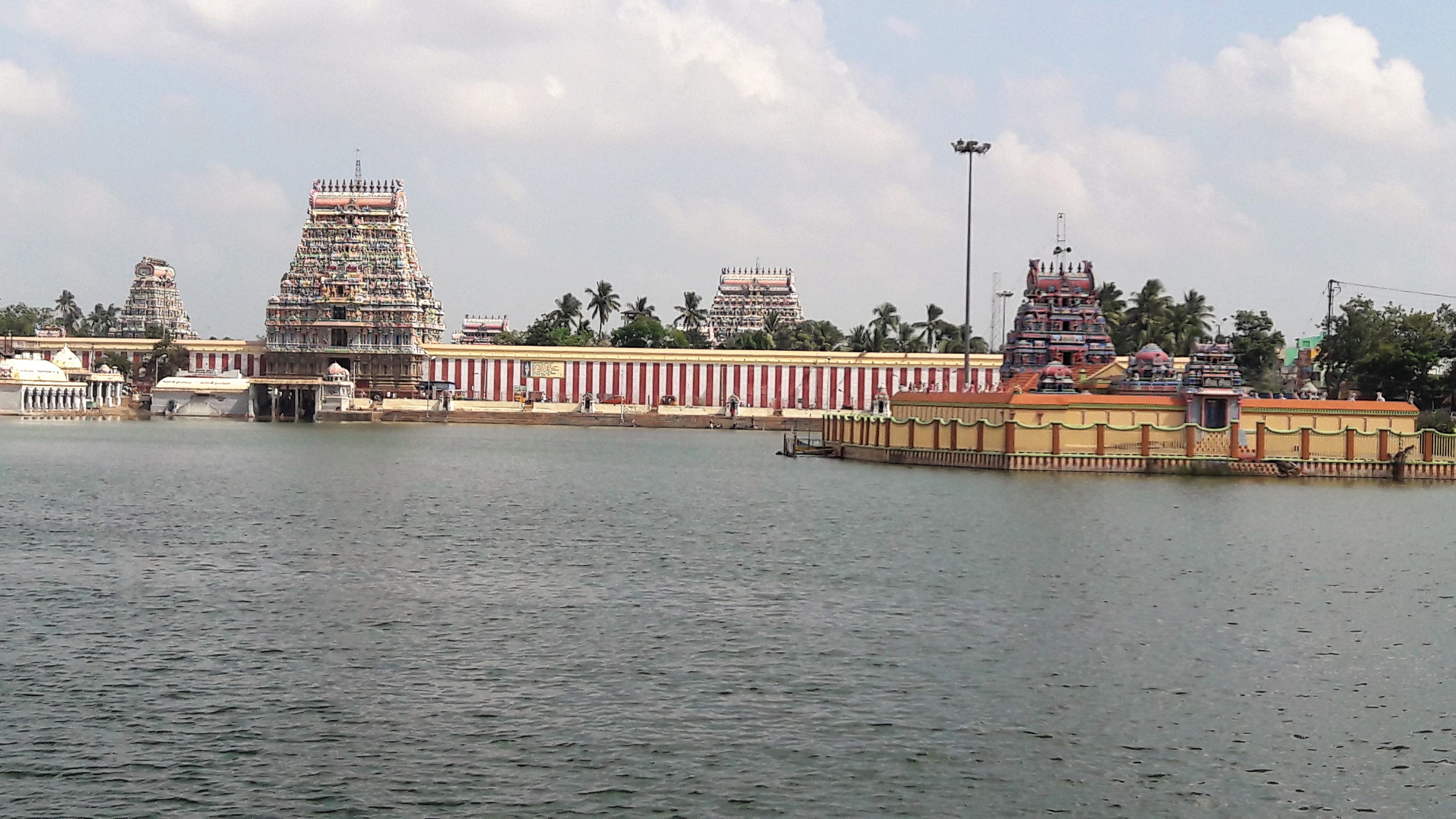
View of the temple tower from the temple tank

The temple complex occupies an area of around 17 acres (6.9 ha) with the Kamalalayam tank to its west, which occupies the same area. The temple has nine gopurams, 80 vimanas, twelve temple walls, 13 halls, fifteen large temple water bodies, three gardens, and three large precincts. The major gopuram of the temple is seven-tiered and raises to a height of 36 m (118 ft). The two main shrines of the temple are for Vanmikinathar (Shiva) and Thyagarajar. Of the two, the former is the most ancient and derives its name from tha anthill (putru), which takes the place of linga in the main shrine. Appar, the 7th-century poet-saint, refers to the main deity in his hymn as Putritrukondan (one who resides in the ant hill). The Stala vriksham (temple tree) is red patiri (trumpet flower tree). The principles and practices of tree-worship and philopatry are ancient bases whereupon a later date linga worship seems to have been established.

As per folk legend, Thiruvarur is mentioned as the capital town of a legendary Chola king, Manu Needhi Cholan, who killed his wicked son to provide justice to a cow. The temple has a sculptural representation of a stone chariot, the king, the cow and his son under the chariot on the northeastern wall.

Here all the nine Navagrahas (planetary deities) are located towards the south in a straight line also located in the northwest corner of 1st (prakaram). It is believed that all the planetary deities were relieved of their curse and hence worshipped Thyagaraja. This temple holds the record of having a maximum number of shrines in India. The feet of Thyagaraja are shown twice a year and on other occasions, it is covered with flowers. The right leg of Thyagarajaswami and the left leg of Nilotpalambika are displayed during the Panguni Uthiram festival and the Thiruvathirai festival (the left leg of the idol is never shown). Some of the major shrines in the temple are Aananthiswarar, Nilotpalambika, Asaleswarar, Adageswarar, Varuneswarar, Annamalieswarar and Kamalambika. The unique feature of the temple is the standing Nandi facing the presiding deity.

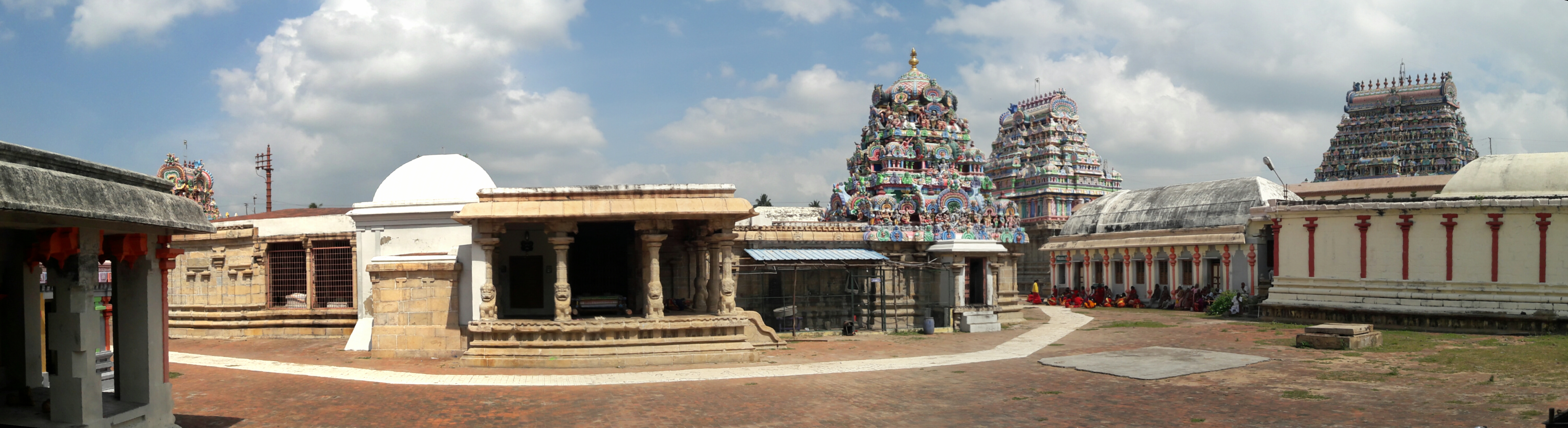
Image of shrines inside the temple

== Chariot festival ==
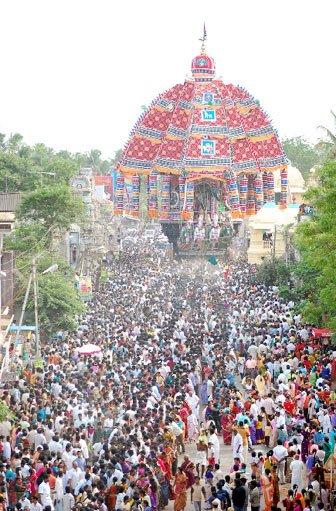
The Thiruvarur chariot festival

Kulothunga Chola II (1133–50 CE) enlarged the temple ritual to have fifty six festivals, some of which are followed in modern times. The annual chariot festival of the Thygarajaswamy temple is celebrated during April – May, corresponding to the Tamil month of Chitrai. The chariot is the largest of its kind in Asia and India weighing 300 tonne with a height of 29 m (96 ft). The chariot comes around the four main streets surrounding the temple during the festival. The event is attended by lakhs of people from all over Tamil Nadu. The chariot festival is followed by the "Theppam", meaning float festival. The memorial for Thiruvalluvar, Valluvar Kottam, is inspired from the design of the Thiruvarur chariot.

== Processional Dance ==
The Thyagarajar Temple at Tiruvarur is famous for the ajapa natanam (dance without chanting), that is executed by the deity itself. According to legend, a Chola king named Mucukunta obtained a boon from Indra and wished to receive an image of Thyagaraja Swamy. reposing on the chest of reclining Vishnu. Indra tried to misguide the king and had six other images made, but the king chose the right image at Tiruvarur. The other six images were installed in Thirukkuvalai, Nagapattinam, Tirukarayil, Tirukolili, Thirukkuvalai and Tirumaraikadu. All the seven places are villages situated in the river Cauvery delta. All seven Thyagaraja images are said to dance when taken in procession (it is the bearers of the processional deity who actually dance). The temples with dance styles are regarded as Saptha Vidangam (seven dance moves) and the related temples are as under:

Temple	Vidangar Temple	Dance pose	Meaning
Tiruvarur Thyagarajar Temple	Vidhividangar	Ajabathaanam	Dance without chanting, resembling the dance of Sri Thyagaraja resting on Vishnu's chest
Dharbaranyeswarar Temple	Nagaradangar	Unmathanathaanam	Dance of an intoxicated person
Kayarohanaswamy Temple	Sundaravidangar	Vilathithaanam	Dancing like waves of sea
Kannayariamudayar Temple	Adhividangar	Kukunathaanam	Dancing like a cock
Brahmapureeswarar Temple	Avanividangar	Brunganathaanam	Dancing like a bee that hovers over a flower
Vaimoornaathar Temple	Nallavidangar	Kamalanaanathaanam	Dance like lotus that moves in a breeze
Vedaranyeswarar Temple	Bhuvanivividangar	Hamsapthanathaanam	Dancing with the gait of a swan

== Music, dance and literature ==
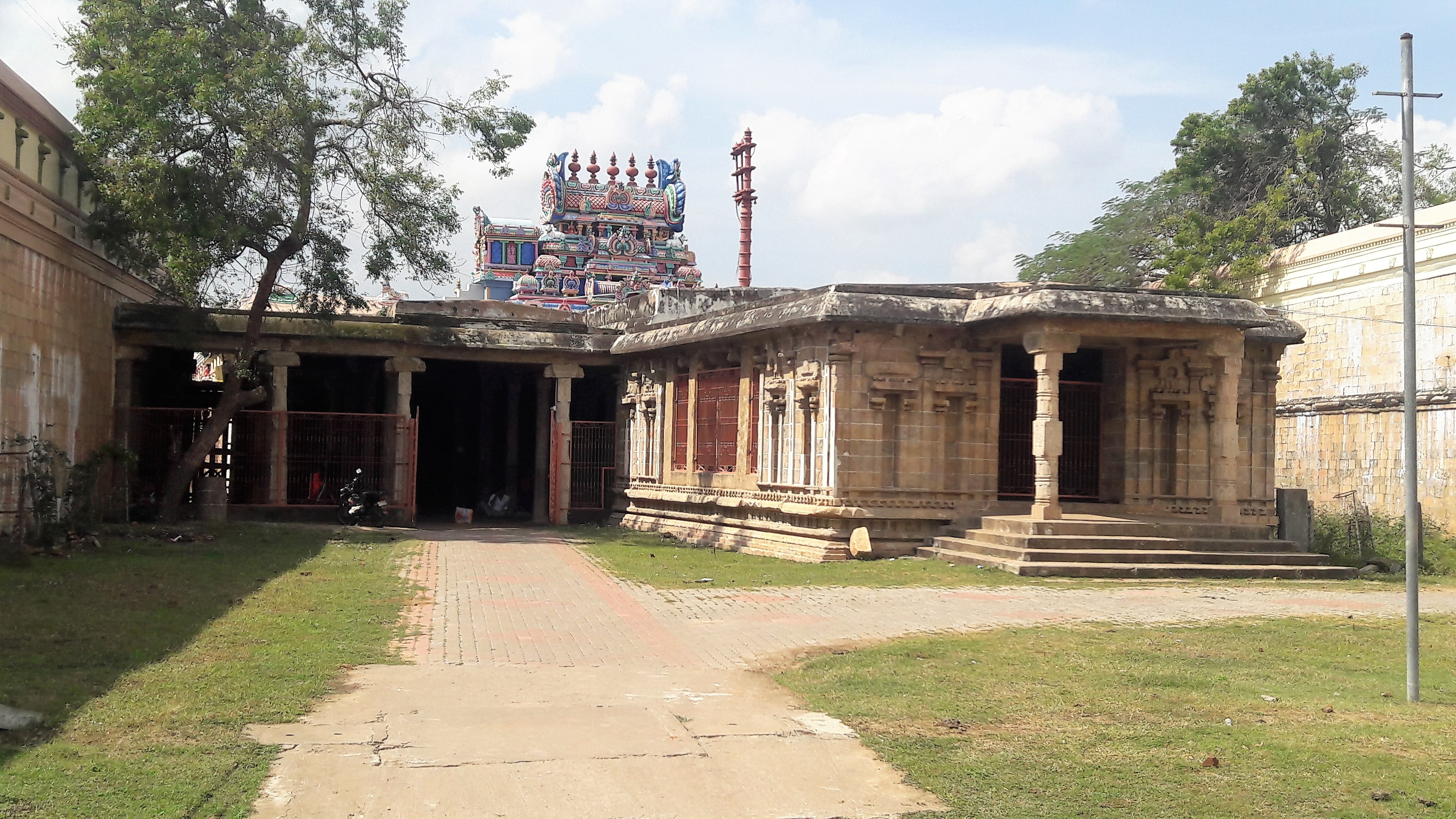
Image of Kamalambal shrine

Historically, Thiruvarur has been a centre of eminent people in religion, arts and science. Sundarar, an 8th-century Saivite saint, mentions "I am the slave of all those born in Thiruvarur" in his works in Tevaram. Two of the 63 nayanmars of Saivite tradition namely, Kalarsinga Nayanar and Tandiyadigal Nayanar were born in Thiruvarur. The Periyapuranam, a 12th-century Saiva canonical by Sekkizhar, dedicates a chapter to those born in Thiruvarur, including these two saints. The town was a traditional centre of music and dance – the inscriptions from Rajaraja Chola associate a large body of dancers associated with the temple. Thiruvarur is home to Trinity of Carnatic music, namely Thyagaraja (1767–1847 CE), Muthuswami Dikshitar (1775–1835 CE) and Shyama Shastri (1762–1827 CE). Muthuswami Dikshitar has sung eulogies of the temple deities of the Thyagarajaswami temple. Thyagaraja was named after the deity of this temple. There was large influx of the acumen of South Indian culture to the town during the 17th century CE due to the political unrest in Thanjavur and increased patronage of the Maratha kings to Thiruvarur, resulting in developments in music and dance. A unique musical instrument called panchamuga vadyam with each of its five ends ornamented differently is used in the temple. A type of nadaswaram (pipe instrument) called Barinayanam is also a unique instrument found only in Thiruvarur. Thyagaraja Leelaikal is a work on the playful nature of the deity Thyagaraja of Thiruvarur. It is similar to the Thiruvilaiyadal Puranam in that it identifies Thyagaraja with the Cholas in the same way that the former identifies Meenakshi with the Pandyas. It is dated to the twelfth century CE.

== Mahasamprokshanam ==
The Mahasamprokshanam also known as Kumbhabhishekam of the temple was held on 8 November 2015. The heavy rains blow in Tiruvarur at the time of mahasamprokshanam, the people came in lot.

== Bibliography ==
- Shanmugasundaram Ponnusamy (1972). Sri Thyagaraja Temple, Thiruvarur. State Dept. of Archaeology, Govt. of Tamil Nadu.
