= Kayarohanaswami Temple, Nagapattinam =

Kayarohanaswami Temple
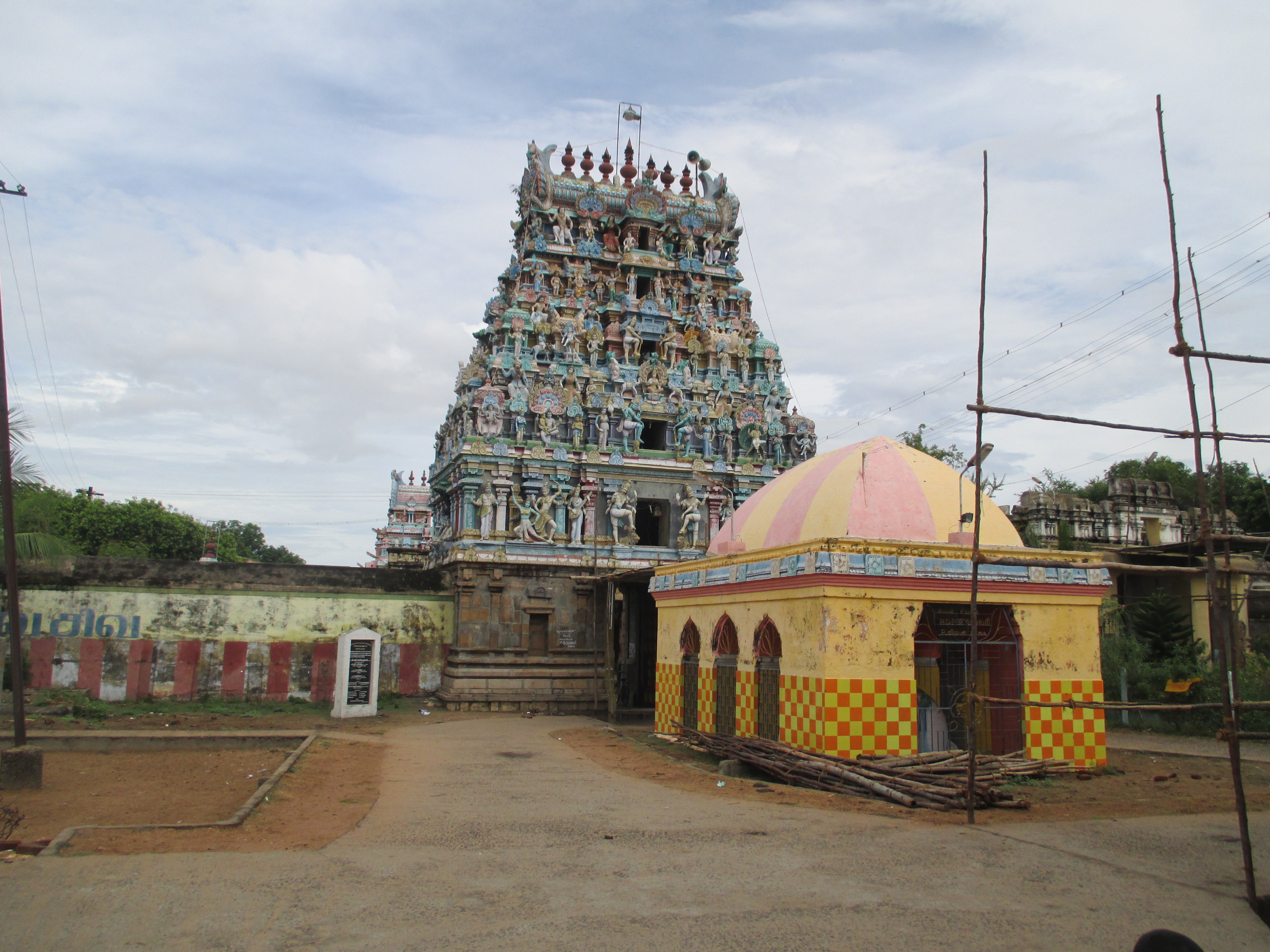

- Location in Tamil Nadu

Religion
- Affiliation: Hinduism
- District: Nagapatnam
- Deity: Kayarohanaswami(Shiva)

Location
- Location: Nagapatnam
- State: Tamil Nadu
- Country: India
- Coordinates: 10°46′13″N 79°50′26″E

Architecture
- Type: Dravidian architecture

Kayarohanaswami Temple, Nagapattinam (காயாரோகணசுவாமி கோயில், நாகபட்டினம்) is a Hindu temple dedicated to Lord Siva situated in the town of Nagapattinam in Tamil Nadu, India. The presiding deity is known as Kayarohana and his consort is Nilayathakshi. The temple has been in existence from the 6th century CE and has been praised by the Nayanmars Appar, Sambandar and Sundarar. The temple has been constructed by the Lakolisa cult which originated in Gujarat and their only other temple in Tamil Nadu is at Kanchipuram. The idol of Thyagaraja in the temple is made of lapis lazuli.

== Etymology ==
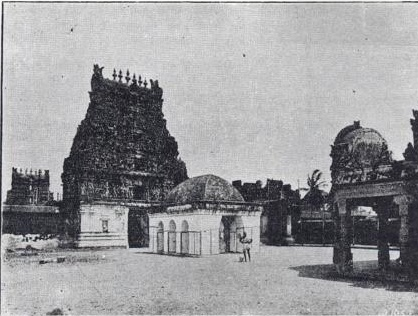
Historical image of the temple

Karona is a corruption of Kaya-rohana(kayam:body, arohana:raising) and the temple is the twin of Kayarohana temple in Gujarat. Karonam might also have been derived from other origin such as "Kar Onam" and Lord Vishnu has been referred to as "Onathan". The temple has been rebuilt by the Pallavas, Cholas and Vijayanagara kings. It is one of the shrines of the 275 Paadal Petra Sthalams.

== Processional Dance ==
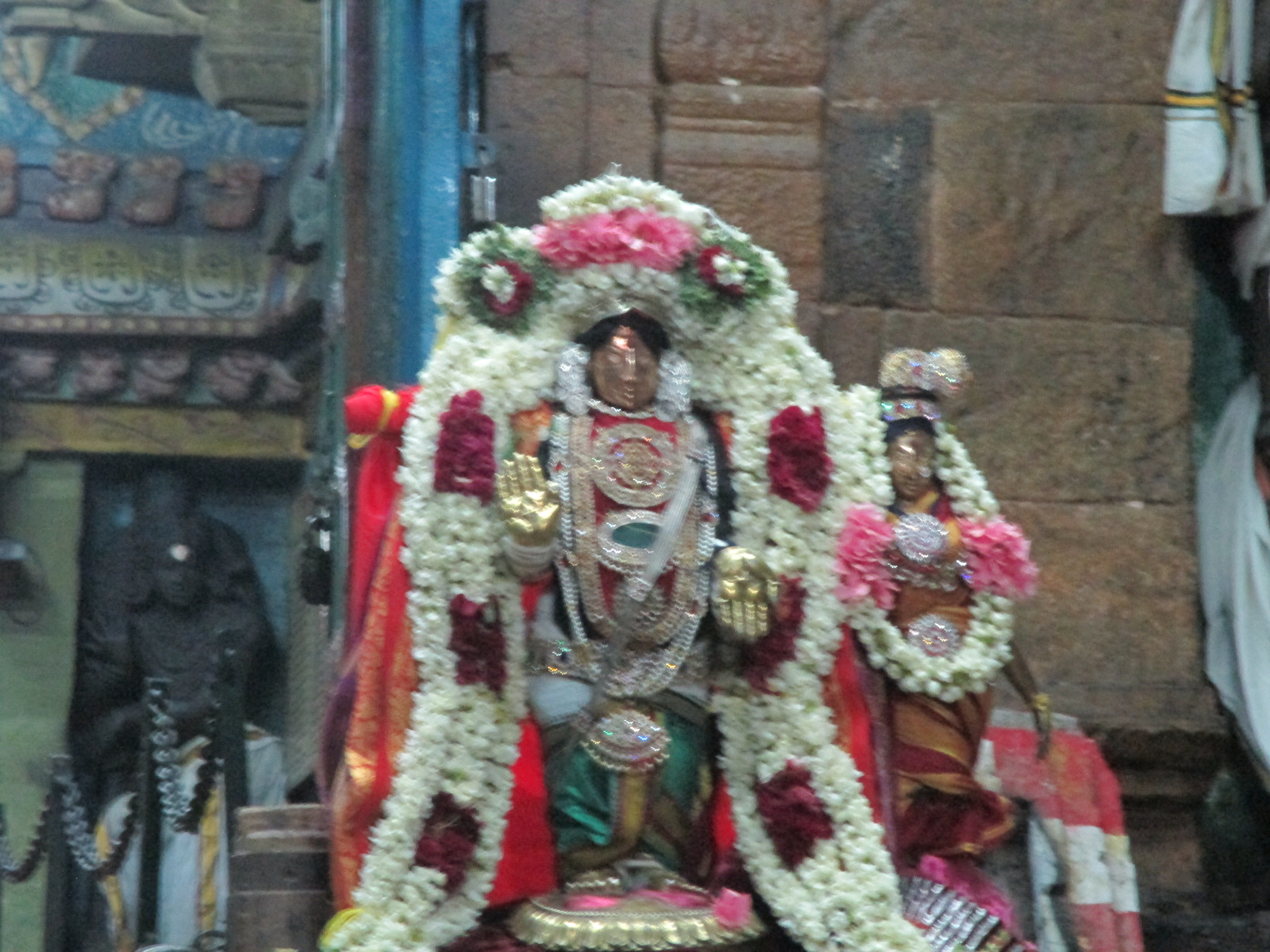
Festive image of the temple

The Thyagarajar Temple at Tiruvarur is famous for the ajapa thanam (dance without chanting), that is executed by the deity itself. According to legend, a Chola king named Mucukunta obtained a boon from Indra (a celestial deity) and wished to receive an image of Thyagaraja Swamy (presiding deity, Shiva in the temple) reposing on the chest of reclining Lord Vishnu. Indra tried to misguide the king and had six other images made, but the king chose the right image at Tiruvarur. The other six images were installed in Thirukkuvalai, Nagapattinam, Tirukarayil, Thirunallar, Thiruvaimur and Tirumaraikadu. All the seven places are villages situated in the river Cauvery delta. All seven Thyagaraja images are said to dance when taken in procession (it is the bearers of the processional deity who actually dance). The temples with dance styles are regarded as Saptha Vidangam (seven dance moves) and the related temples are as under:

Temple	Vidangar Temple	Dance pose	Meaning
Thyagarajar Temple	Vidhividangar	Ajabathaanam	Dance without chanting, resembling the dance of Sri Thyagaraja resting on Lord Vishnu's chest
Dharbaranyeswarar Temple	Nagaradangar	Unmathanathaanam	Dance of an intoxicated person
Kayarohanaswamy Temple	Sundaravidangar	Vilathithaanam	Dancing like waves of sea
Kannayariamudayar Temple	Adhividangar	Kukunathaanam	Dancing like a cock
Brahmapureeswarar Temple	Avanividangar	Brunganathaanam	Dancing like a bee that hovers over a flower
Vaimoornaathar Temple	Nallavidangar	Kamalanaanathaanam	Dance like lotus that moves in a breeze
Vedaranyeswarar Temple	Bhuvanivividangar	Hamsapthanathaanam	Dancing with the gait of a swan

The temple is a Shakti peeda. Thyagaraja is known as Sundara Vitankar ang believed to perform Paarava Tharanga Natanam.

== Photogallery ==
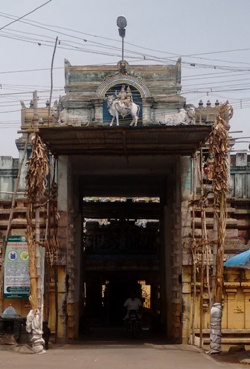
Main entrance

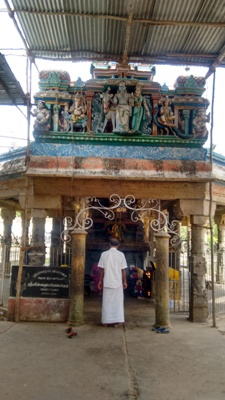
Vinayakar shrine

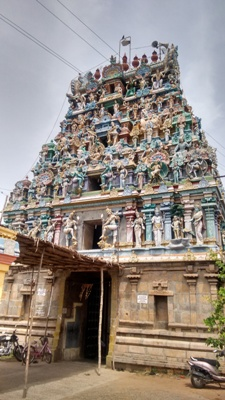
Five tier gopura

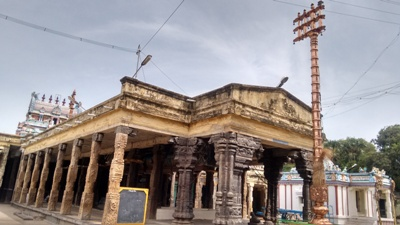
Flagpost

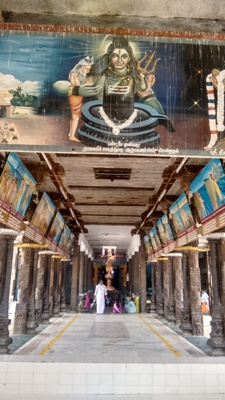
Front mandapa

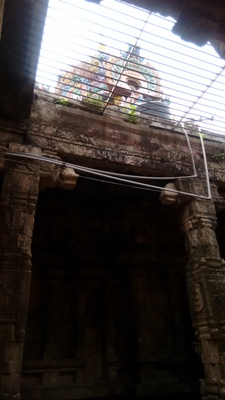
Vimana of the presiding deity

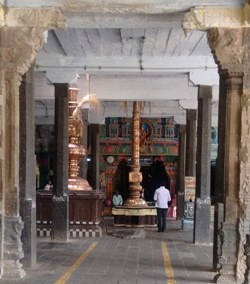
Vimana of the consort
