= Tirunallar Dharbaranyeswarar Temple =

Dharbaranyeswarar Temple
- Dharbaranyam
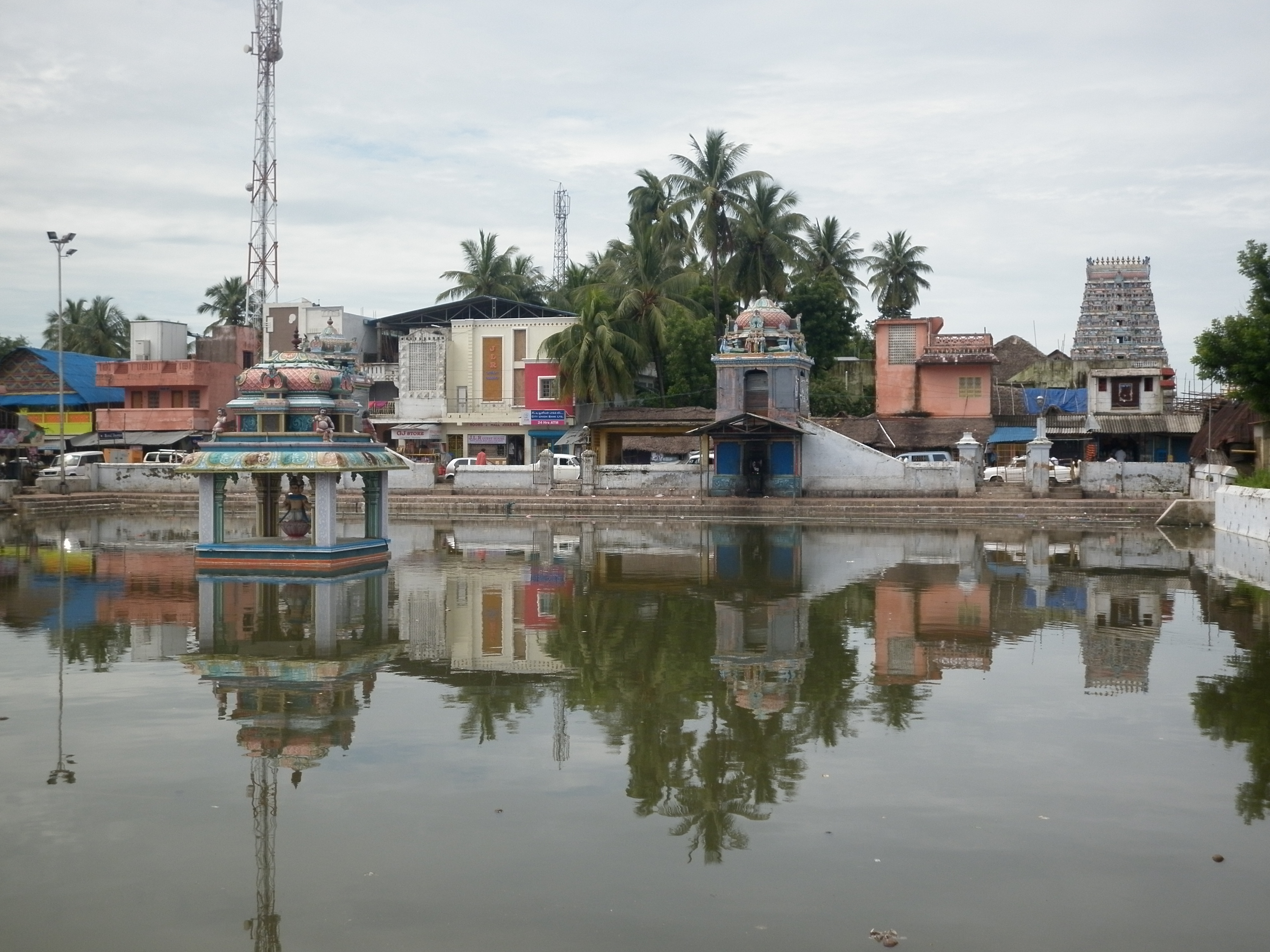

- Location in Tamil Nadu

Religion
- Affiliation: Hinduism
- District: Karaikkal
- Deity: Dharbaranyeswarar (Shiva) and Bogamartha Poonmulaiyaal (Parvati), Shani

Location
- Location: Tirunallar
- State: Pondicherry
- Country: India
- Coordinates: 10°55′32″N 79°47′32″E

Architecture
- Type: Dravidian architecture

Dharbaranyeswarar Temple, more popularly known as Tirunallar Saniswaran Temple, is a Hindu temple dedicated to the deity Shiva, located in the Thirunallar village of the Karaikal district, in the Union territory of Puducherry, Southeastern India.

The temple complex covers around 2 acres (0.81 ha) and entered through a five tiered gopuram, the main gateway. The temple has a number of shrines, with those of Shiva as Dharbaranyeswarar, his consort Praneswari Amman (Parvati), Shani (Saniswararan) and Somaskanda (a combined form of Shiva with Parvati and his son Murugan) being the most prominent. All the shrines of the temple are enclosed in large concentric rectangular granite walls. The present masonry structure was built during the Chola dynasty in the 9th century, while later expansions are attributed to Vijayanagar rulers. The temple is maintained and administered by the Department of Hindu Religious Institutions by the Government of Puducherry.

The temple has six daily rituals at various times from 6:00 a.m. to 9:00 p.m., and four yearly festivals on its calendar. Mahasivarathri festival celebrated during the month of the Chittirai (March - April) is the most prominent festival of the temple for the presiding deity, while Sanipeyarchi festival that occurs every 2.5 years is the most prominent for Shani.

== Legend ==
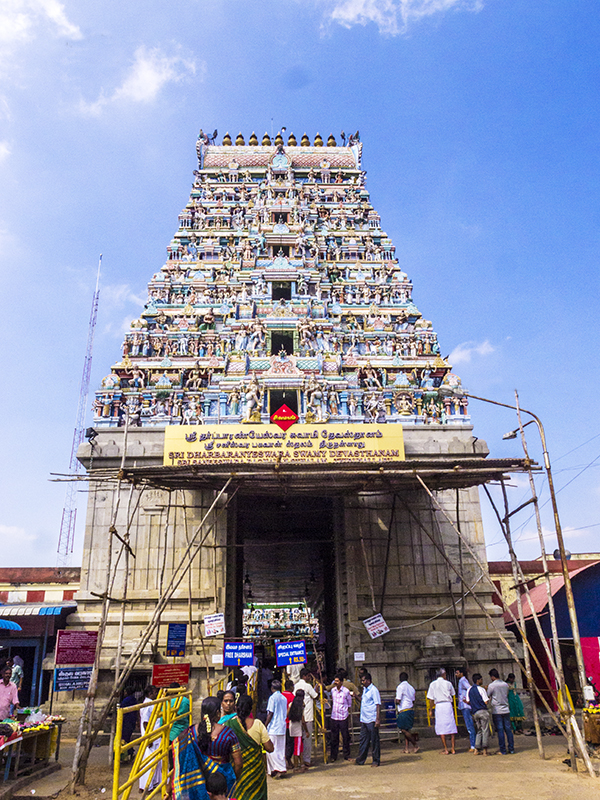
The Rajagopuram of the temple

As per Hindu legend, the ruler of the region asked a shepherd to provide milk to the temple daily. The shepherd was a staunch devotee of Shiva and happily provided milk for ablution of the presiding deity. The government's headman, who lived close to the temple, coerced the shepherd to give the milk to him, instead of the temple, without the knowledge of the king. Once, the temple priest informed the king that the temple was not receiving the milk from the shepherd. The king asked the shepherd the reason for disobeying his order. Out of fear of the headman, the shepherd remained silent, which angered the king. He ordered the shepherd to be killed. The shepherd prayed to Shiva to relieve him of the punishment. Shiva stopped the punishment with his trident. Following the legend, the altar (bali pitham) of the temple is slightly away from the axis of the flagstaff and the central shrine.

As per another legend, Nala was ruling this region, full of tropical grass locally called Darba after which the place came to be known as Darbaranyam ("forest of Darba"). Every person is afflicted by the movement of planet Saturn, which is believed to create negative effects on the lives of people. Nala was also afflicted by the planetary movement of Saturn on a day when he skipped standard practices of cleanliness. He is believed to have resided in the temple to get himself off the curses of Shani, the planet Saturn. He prayed to Shiva and wanted him to protect all the devotees afflicted with Shani to be protected when they visit the temple. Following the legend, people afflicted take a holy dip with oil in Nala theertham, the temple tank and wear black dress.

== Architecture ==
The temple is located in Thirunallar, a village located 5 km (3.1 mi) away from Karaikkal in the Union territory of Puducherry and 95 km (59 mi) from Thanjavur. The temple has a rectangular plan with a five-tiered rajagopuram, the gateway tower and all the shrines are enclosed in granite walls. The presiding deity is Dharbaranyeswarar (Shiva) and is believed to have been made of darba grass. The central shrine is located in an elevated platform axial to the main entrance. The sanctum houses the image of Dharbaranyeswarar in the form of lingam (aniconic form of Shiva). The southern shrine parallel to the shrine of sanctum houses the image of Somaskanda. The niches around the sanctum houses the images of Dakshinamurthy, Durga and Lingodbhava. The shrine of Shani (the god of the planet Saturn) is located in the northern side of the entrance tower. Shani is treated as the door keeper of the shrine. According to Hinduism, Saturn resides in each rasi (zodiac) for two and half years. The tradition is to worship Shani before entering the inner sanctum of Shiva. The temple is maintained and administered by the Department of Hindu Religious Institutions by the Government of Puducherry.

== Processional Dance ==
The Thyagarajar Temple at Tiruvarur is famous for the ajapa thanam (dance without chanting), that is executed by the deity itself. According to legend, a Chola king named Mucukunta obtained a boon from the god Indra and wished to receive an image of Thyagaraja (presiding deity Shiva in the temple) reposing on the chest of reclining Vishnu. Indra tried to misguide the king and had six other images made, but the king chose the right image at Tiruvarur. The other six images were installed in Thirunallar, Nagapattinam, Tirukarayil, Tirukolili, Thirukkuvalai and Tirumaraikadu. All the seven places are villages situated in the river Cauvery delta. All seven Thyagaraja images are said to dance when taken in procession(it is the bearers of the processional deity who actually dance). The temples with dance styles are regarded as Saptha Vidangam (seven dance moves) and the related temples are as under:

| Temple | Vidangar Temple | Dance pose | Meaning |
| Thyagarajar Temple | Vidhividangar | Ajabathaanam | Dance without chanting, resembling the dance of Thyagaraja resting on Vishnu's chest |
| Dharbaranyeswarar Temple | Nagaradangar | Unmathanathaanam | Dance of an intoxicated person |
| Kayarohanaswamy Temple | Sundaravidangar | Vilathithaanam | Dancing like waves of sea |
| Kannayariamudayar Temple | Adhividangar | Kukunathaanam | Dancing like a cock |
| Brahmapureeswarar Temple | Avanividangar | Brunganathaanam | Dancing like a bee that hovers over a flower |
| Vaimoornaathar Temple | Nallavidangar | Kamalanaanathaanam | Dance like lotus that moves in a breeze |
| Vedaranyeswarar Temple | Bhuvanivividangar | Hamsapthanathaanam | Dancing with the gait of a swan |

== Religious significance ==
Sambandar, the 7th century nayanar and Tamil saivite poet has revered the deity with four hymns, in one of which he refers to a contest with Jains, and his victory. Appar and Sundarar, the other Nayanars have glorified the temple with their hymns. Arunagirinathar, a 15th-century poet and staunch devotee of Lord Muruga has composed hymns on the deity and this temple is attributed to Murugan worship as well. Tirugnana Sambandar, a 7th-century Tamil Saivite poet, venerated Naganathar in ten verses in Tevaram, compiled as the First Tirumurai. Appar, a contemporary of Sambandar, also venerated Dharbaranyeswarar in 10 verses in Tevaram, compiled as the Fifth Tirumurai. As the temple is revered in Tevaram, it is classified as Paadal Petra Sthalam, one of the 275 temples that find mention in the Saiva canon.

The temple is one of the nine Navagraha temples of Tamil Nadu and is a part of the popular Navagraha pilgrimage in the state - it houses the image of Shani (Saturn).

== Religious practices ==
The temple priests perform the pooja (rituals) during festivals and on a daily basis. Like other Shiva temples of Tamil Nadu, the priests belong to the Shaivaite community. The temple rituals are performed six times a day; Ushatkalam at 5:30 a.m., Kalashanti at 8:00 a.m., Uchikalam at 12:00 p.m., Sayarakshai at 6:00 p.m., Irandamkalam at 8:00 p.m. and Arddha Jamam at 9:00 p.m. Each ritual comprises four steps: abhishekam (sacred bath), alankaram (decoration), naivedyam (food offering) and deepa aradhanai (waving of lamps) for both Dharbaranyeswarar and Praneswari Amman. The worship is held amidst music with nagaswaram (pipe instrument) and tavil (percussion instrument), religious instructions in the Vedas read by priests and prostration by worshippers in front of the temple mast. There are weekly rituals like somavaram and sukravaram, fortnightly rituals like pradosham and monthly festivals like amavasai (new moon day), kruttika, purnima (full moon day) and chaturthi.
