= Emerald Lingam =

Lingam with embedded emeralds

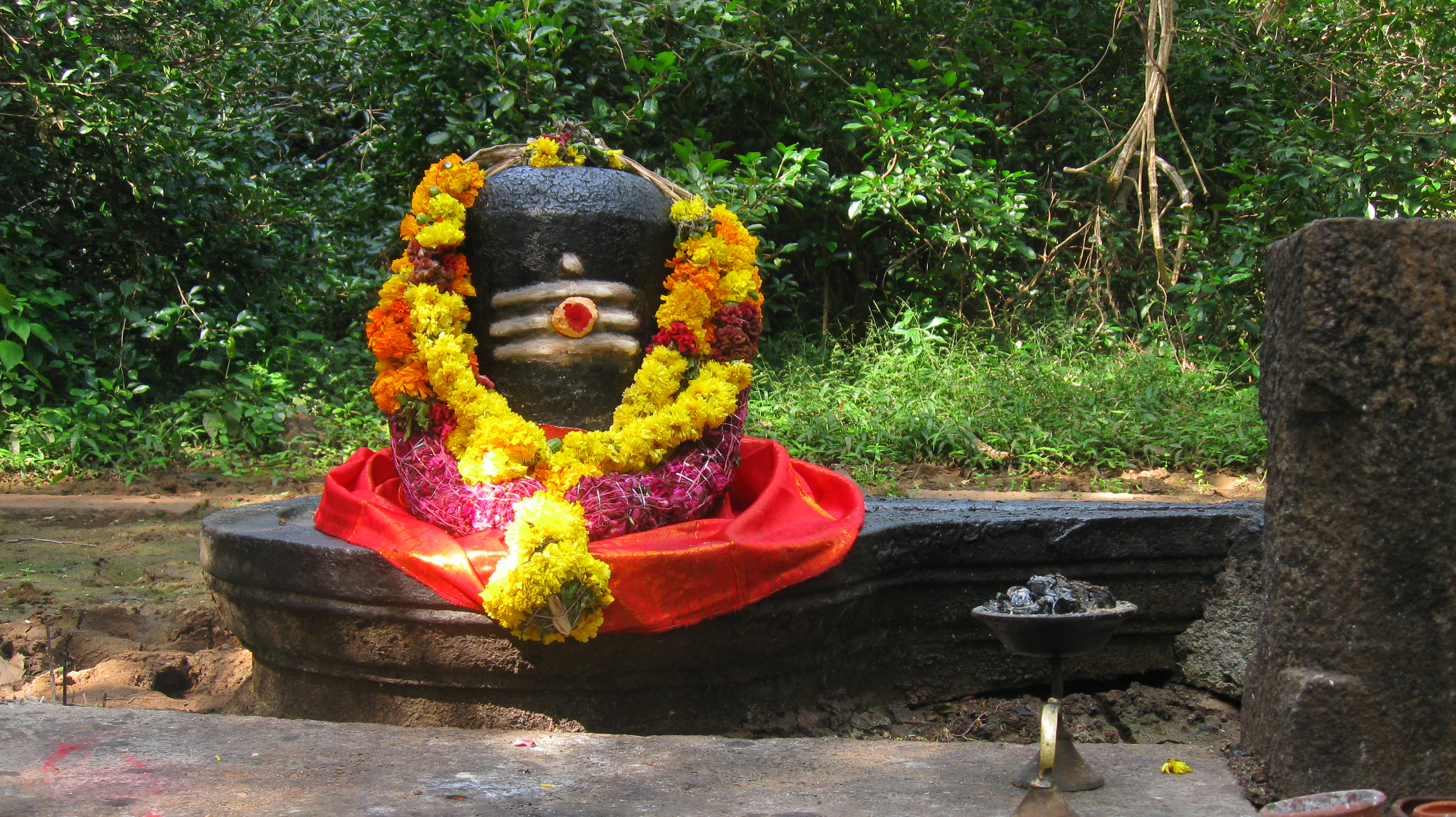
Siva Lingam

Emerald Lingams are established in many Hindu Temples in Tamil Nadu.

== Properties of Emerald ==
Emerald (Tamil: மரகதம்)is a variety of the mineral beryl (Be_{3}Al_{2}(SiO_{3})_{6}) colored green by trace amounts of chromium and sometimes vanadium. The hardness of Beryl is 7.5–8 on the 10 point Mohs scale of mineral hardness. The toughness (resistance to breakage) of Emerald is classified as generally poor, hence most emeralds are highly included.

=== Gemstone ===
Emerald is a green gemstone. Emerald means the shade of green color. Because of its green color, the term Emerald is employed. Emerald is also associated with the eighth planet Mercury in the Solar System. Lord Budha (Devanagari: बुध ) (Tamil: புதன்) is considered as the god of the planet Mercury. According to Hindu mythology Lord Budha is considered as one among the nine Navagrahas. He represents green color and gemstone emerald. He is also the god of merchandise and protector of merchants. He is of Rajas Guna and represents Communication. as well as the Navagraha.

=== Religious properties ===
Puranas recommend to worship the gemstone in the form of Siva Lingam. The kings and emperors considered that the statues carved using emerald stones have divine power. They also considered that the emerald stone is free from faults (doshas). Worshiping Lord Siva in the form of emerald Lingam will remove all miseries and sins (doshas) and will also bring prosperity, improve health, enhance learning (education) and may give chance to have acquaintance with king or the ruler.

== Saptha Vitanga shrines ==
It is learned that the Chola emperor Musukuntha (12th Century) got seven emerald Siva Lingams from Lord Indra, the King of the Devas, God of Weather and War. (Devanagari: इन्द्र or इंद्र),(Tamil:இந்திரன் என்ற தேவேந்திரன்). Lord Indra was worshiping these seven emerald Siva Lingams. The emperor never wanted to worship the icon for himself and felt that it was appropriate to install these icons for the worship of his subjects (the common people). Accordingly, he made arrangements to install them in seven important Siva Temples located at Nagapattinam, Thirukaravasal, Thirukuvalai, Thirunallar and Thiruvaymur, Vedaranyam.

The milk consecration over the Saptha Vitanga Thyaga shrines have medicinal properties. Similarly the sandal paste applied around the emerald Siva Lingams have high amount of medicinal properties.

== Thiru Idaisuram ==
Thiru Idaisuram (also called as Thiruvadi Soolam) is the temple devoted to Lord Siva. It is located between Chengalpattu and Thiruporur and located about 7 km from Chengalpattu. At this shrine Lord Siva manifested himself as emerald Siva Lingam. The transparent icon reflects the bright greenish colored light when arathi shown before the Lord. The icon was found within the ant mount and the goddess brought out the idol by pouring the milk over the ant mount.

== Sirukarumpur Kamatchi Sametha Thiripuranthaka Esvarar Temple ==
The emerald Siva Lingam at Sirukarumpur, near Kaveripakkam, Vellore District, Tamil nadu is around one thousand years old. It is learned that this idol was stolen.

== Maruthasaleswarar Temple, Thiru Engoimalai ==
The emerald Siva Lingam at Maruthasaleswarar Temple, Thiru Engoimalai, near Musiri, Trichy District appears more greenish and it is also considered as one of the antique valued idol.

== Nanjundeswarar Temple, Nanjanagoodu, Mysore ==
At Nanjundeswarar Temple, Nanjanagoodu, Mysore the then Mysore Wodeyar dynasty has installed one emerald Siva Lingam.

== Mangaleswari Sametha Mangalanatha Swami Temple, Uthirakosamangai ==
At Mangaleswari Sametha Mangalanatha Swami Temple, Uthirakosamangai, there is world fame Lord Nataraja idol. Lord Nataraja appears in a separate shrine. The idol is about 5 1/2 feet tall. This temple is located near Ramanathapuram town in Tamil nadu. This idol will be covered with sandal paste on all days except the annual Thiruvathirai star day on which the Arudra festival (December month) falls. On this day alone the idol is consecrated and covered again with sandal paste. This temple also possess one emerald Siva Lingam and one Spatika Lingam. Both these idols consecrated daily except on annual Thiruvathirai star day. The reason for covering the idol with sand paste is that the idol has fragile properties and may not bear sound and light waves. The sandal paste removed from the idol is distributed to the devotees.

== Siruvapuri Balasubramania Swamy Temple ==
Siruvapuri Balasubramania Swamy Temple is located on the north western side of Chennai city and is lying 33 km from Chennai. The visitor needs to take diversion from Chennai Kalkotta National Highway. The except the idols of Lord Balasubramaiya Swamy, Aadhimoolar and Navagrahams, all the other idols are carved out of emerald stone. The beautiful emerald peacock appears near flag post. On the south west corner the emerald Sun god is located. Similarly on the eastern side there is one emerald Vinayaka idol (Lord Rajaganapathy). On the southern side there is one emerald Annamalai (Lord Siva) idol. No such shrine has this many emerald idols in South India. The idols are huge in size and shining.

== Sri Vijaya Ganapathy Temple, GandhiChowk, Khammam, Telangana - 507003 ==
Vaayu Prathistha of Emerald/Marakatha/Maragatha lingam is completed in the month of June/July 2018 at Sri Vijaya Ganapathy Temple located in Gandhichowk in Khammam.

Temple has provided water and vessels. Devotees can perform abhishekam by themselves from morning 7:00 AM to 11:00 AM.

Marakatha lingam at Sri Vijaya ganapathy temple in Khammam

For more information, please contact temple authorities.
