= Vaimoornathar Temple, Tiruvaimur =

Vaimoornathar Temple
- Tiruvaimur
- Location in Tamil Nadu

Religion
- Affiliation: Hinduism
- District: Tiruvarur
- Deity: Vaimoornathar(Shiva)

Location
- Location: Tiruvaimur
- State: Tamil Nadu
- Country: India
- Coordinates: 10°37′N 79°43′E

Architecture
- Type: Dravidian architecture

Vaimoornathar Temple is a Hindu temple dedicated to Lord Shiva located in Tiruvaimur in Tiruvarur district of Tamil Nadu, India. The temple is revered in the hymns of 7th-century-CE Tamil saivite poets, Appar and Campantar and is classified as Paadal Petra Sthalam (No:124).

== The Temple ==
The presiding deity is Vaimoornathar (Lord Siva) is believed to have been worshipped by Surya(Sun god). Lord Siva appeared in the dreams of Appar, the 7th-century-CE nayanar and Tamil saivite poet and ordered him to make to Tiruvaimur. After making his visits to Tirupazhanam, Tiruvalanchuzhi, Tirunallur and Kumbakonam arrived at the temple here on the day of Tirvathirai for temple festivities. Sambandar also followed him and both these poets revered the Lord here with their hymns. Thyagarajar is called Neela Vidangar and is believed to perform Kamala Natanam.

== Processional Dance ==
The Thyagarajar Temple at Tiruvarur is famous for the ajapa thanam(dance without chanting), that is executed by the deity itself. According to legend, a Chola king named Mucukunta obtained a boon from Indra(a celestial deity) and wished to receive an image of Thyagaraja Swamy(presiding deity, Shiva in the temple) reposing on the chest of reclining Lord Vishnu. Indra tried to misguide the king and had six other images made, but the king chose the right image at Tiruvarur. The other six images were installed in Thiruvaimur, Thirukkuvalai, Nagapattinam, Tirukarayil, Thirunallar, and Tirumaraikadu. All the seven places are villages situated in the river Cauvery delta. All seven Thyagaraja images are said to dance when taken in procession(it is the bearers of the processional deity who actually dance). The temples with dance styles are regarded as Saptha Vidangam(seven dance moves) and the related temples are as under:

Temple	Vidangar Temple	Dance pose	Meaning
Thyagarajar Temple	Vidhividangar	Ajabathaanam	Dance without chanting, resembling the dance of Sri Thyagaraja resting on Lord Vishnu's chest
Dharbaranyeswarar Temple	Nagaradangar	Unmathanathaanam	Dance of an intoxicated person
Kayarohanaswamy Temple	Sundaravidangar	Vilathithaanam	Dancing like waves of sea
Kannayariamudayar Temple	Adhividangar	Kukunathaanam	Dancing like a cock
Brahmapureeswarar Temple	Avanividangar	Brunganathaanam	Dancing like a bee that hovers over a flower
Vaimoornaathar Temple	Nallavidangar	Kamalanaanathaanam	Dance like lotus that moves in a breeze
Vedaranyeswarar Temple	Bhuvanivividangar	Hamsapthanathaanam	Dancing with the gait of a swan
