= Tyagaraja Lilaikal =

Tamil religious treatise

The Tyagaraja Lilaikal (Tamil: தியாகராஜ லீலைகள், romanized: Tyāgarāja Līlaikal; transl. The lilas of Tyagaraja) or the Tiyākarājalīlaikal is a Tamil religious treatise on the playful nature of the deity Tyagaraja (Shiva) of Tiruvarur. It is similar to the Tiruvilaiyadal Puranam in that it identifies Tyagaraja with the Cholas in the same way that the former identifies Meenakshi with the Pandyas. It is dated to the twelfth century CE.

== Content ==
The following are some excerpts from the work:

Lilai 1: The first act begins with Shiva asking Vishvakarma to build a town at Tiruvarur with a Valmika temple at its centre.

Lilai 3: This act begins with Shiva appearing as Tyagaraja and is hailed as the kuladaivam of the region.

Lilai 8: Tyagaraja asks Airavata to garland the future king of Chola Nadu as the land is without a king. Airavata garlands a sage who is of the Suryavamsha or Solar race.

Lilai 53: In this act Tyagaraja dons the robe of a king and dispenses justice to a family that is falsely denied of its wealth.

Lilai 70: This chapter explains how the children of Chola king Vikrama are saved by Tyagaraja when Sakuna Pandya tries to kill them using magic.

Lilai 102: In this act, Tyagaraja helps the Chola general against the Pandyas.

Lilai 248: In this chapter, we are told that when the Chola king was wounded in combat, blood poured out of the shoulder of Tyagaraja.

Lilai 322: In this act, celestial women play the veena everyday to Tyagaraja and they are blessed to be born as mortals and wed Chola kings.

Lilai 364: This chapter explains the grace of Tyagaraja to Āticholan.
