= Thirukkuvalai =

Thirukkuvalai திருக்குவளை
- village
- Location in Tamil Nadu, India
- Coordinates: 10°35′02″N 79°42′45″E
- Country: India
- State: Tamil Nadu
- District: Nagapattinam

Area
  - Total: 7.291 km^{2} (2.815 sq mi)

Population (2011)
  - Total: 4,255
  - Density: 583.6/km^{2} (1,512/sq mi)

Languages
  - Official: Tamil
- Time zone: UTC+5:30 (IST)
- PIN: 610204
- Telephone code: 04365
- Vehicle registration: TN 51
- Literacy: 80%
- Lok Sabha constituency: Nagapattinam
- Vidhan Sabha constituency: Nagapattinam

Thirukkuvalai is a village situated in Nagapattinam district of Indian state of Tamil Nadu.

The village is known for the Brahmapureeswarar Temple. It is the birthplace of former chief minister of the state, M. Karunanidhi, where his ancestral home functions as a library.

== Demographics ==
According to the latest 2011 Indian census, the village has a population of 4,255 divided in 1,161 families of which male population is 2,135 and female with 2,120, 10.62 percent of population is under six years of age. The literacy rate of 80.94 percent and the sex ratio 993 are almost same as that of the state level which is 80.09 percent and 996. Literacy stands at 88.21 percent for men and 73.74 percent for women.
