= Kannayariamudayar Temple, Thirukkarayil =

Hindu temple

Kannayiranathar Swamy Temple
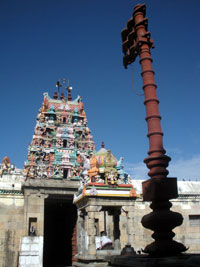

- Location in Tamil Nadu

Religion
- Affiliation: Hinduism
- District: Nagapattinam
- Deity: Kannayiranathar Swamy (Shiva
- Festival: Maha Shivaratri

Location
- Location: Thirukarayil
- State: Tamil Nadu
- Country: India
- Coordinates: 10.6687°N 79.6525°E

Architecture
- Type: Dravidian architecture

Specifications
- Temple: One
- Elevation: 35.67 m (117 ft)

Kannayiranathar Swamy Temple, Thirukkarayil (also called Tirukarahil or Tirukarayil) is a Hindu temple of Shiva located in Thirukaravasal in Nagapattinam district of Tamil Nadu, India. Constructed in the Dravidian style of architecture, the temple is believed to have been built during the Cholas period in the 9th century CE. Shiva is worshipped as Kannayiranathar and his consort Parvathi as Kailasanayaki.

The presiding deity is mentioned in the 7th-century-CE Tamil Saiva canonical work, the Tevaram, written by Tamil saint poets known as the Nayanmars and classified as Paadal Petra Sthalam. A granite wall surrounds the temple, enclosing all its shrines. The temple has a five-tiered Rajagopuram, the gateway tower.

The temple is maintained and administered by the Hindu Religious and Endowment Board of the Government of Tamil Nadu.

== Legend ==
As per Hindu legend, Bheema, one of the five Pandavas propitiated himself off the sin of killing Bakasura by worshipping Shiva at the temple. Another legend is that once, while Vishnu and Brahma contested for superiority, Shiva appeared as a flame, and challenged them to find his source. Brahma took the form of a swan, and flew to the sky to see the top of the flame, while Vishnu became the boar Varaha, and sought its base. The scene is called lingothbava, and is represented in the western wall at the sanctum of most Shiva temples. Neither Brahma nor Vishnu could find the source, and while Vishnu conceded his defeat, Brahma lied and said he had found the pinnacle. In punishment, Shiva ordained that Brahma would never have temples on earth in his worship. To relieve himself off the curse, Brahma made a linga of sand here and worshipped Shiva here. The presiding deity thus came to be known as Brahmapureeswar, the one who was worshipped by Shiva. Sundarar, the famous Saivite saint is believed to have worshipped Shiva in this place to seek help for transporting paddy grains to Tiruvarur.

== Architecture ==
The temple is believed to have been built during the Medieval Chola period with subsequent addition during Pandyas. The temple has a five-tiered rajagopuram, the entrance tower. There are four bodies of water associated with the temple in all four directions. Brahma Tirtha is located opposite to the temple, Agasthya Tirtha to the west, Vinayaga Tirtha in the north and Sakthi theertha, a small well near the Ambal shrine. The presiding deity in the form of Linga (an iconic form of Shiva) is housed in the central shrine, which is located axial to the gateway tower. The sanctum is preceded by an ardhamandapa and a mukhamandapa, rectangular halls before the sanctum. There is a small shrine of Agastya Linga and Sivaloka Vinayaga inside the premises. Following the legend of Navagrahas worshipping the presiding deity, the planetary deities are located in a single line facing the sanctum. There are images of Sundarar and Paravai Nachiyar in the temple.
