= Venu =

Indian flute

Vēṇu
- Other names: Muraḷi, Vēṇuvu, Pillana grōvi, Kūḷalu, Pullangkuḻal, Oodakuḻal
- Classification: Indian Woodwind Instrument

Playing range
- More than 2.5 Octaves (8-hole bamboo flute)

Related instruments
- Bansuri

Musicians
- List of Indian Flautists

More articles or information
- Palladam Sanjiva Rao, H. Ramachandra Shastry, T. R. Mahalingam, T. Viswanathan etc..

The venu (Sanskrit: वेणु; vēṇu/मुरळि; muraļi) is one of the ancient transverse flutes of Indian classical music. It is an aerophone typically made from bamboo, that is a side blown wind instrument. It continues to be in use in the South Indian Carnatic music tradition. It is referred to as nadi and tunava in the Rigveda and other Vedic texts of Hinduism. In northern Indian music, a similar flute is called bansuri. In the south, it is also called by various other names such as pullanguḻal (புல்லாங்குழல்) in Tamil (Tamil Nadu), oodakuḻal (ഓടകുഴൽ) or kurungu kuḻal (കുറുന് കുഴൽ) in Malayalam (Kerala) and ಕೊಳಲು (koḷalu) or ಮುರಳಿ (muraļi) in Kannada (Karnataka) . It is known as pillana grōvi (పిల్లన గ్రోవి) or vēṇuvu (వేణువు) in Telugu (Andhra Pradesh & Telangana). It is also called as Carnatic Flute.

The venu is discussed as an important musical instrument in the Natya Shastra, the classic Hindu text on music and performance arts. The ancient Sanskrit texts of India describe other side blown flutes such as the murali and vamsika, but sometimes these terms are used interchangeably. A venu has six holes, is about the thickness of a thumb, and twelve fingers long. A longer murali has four holes and two hands longs. The vamsika has eight holes, between twelve and seventeen fingers long.

A venu is a part of the iconography of Hindu god shree Krishna.

== Construction and technique ==
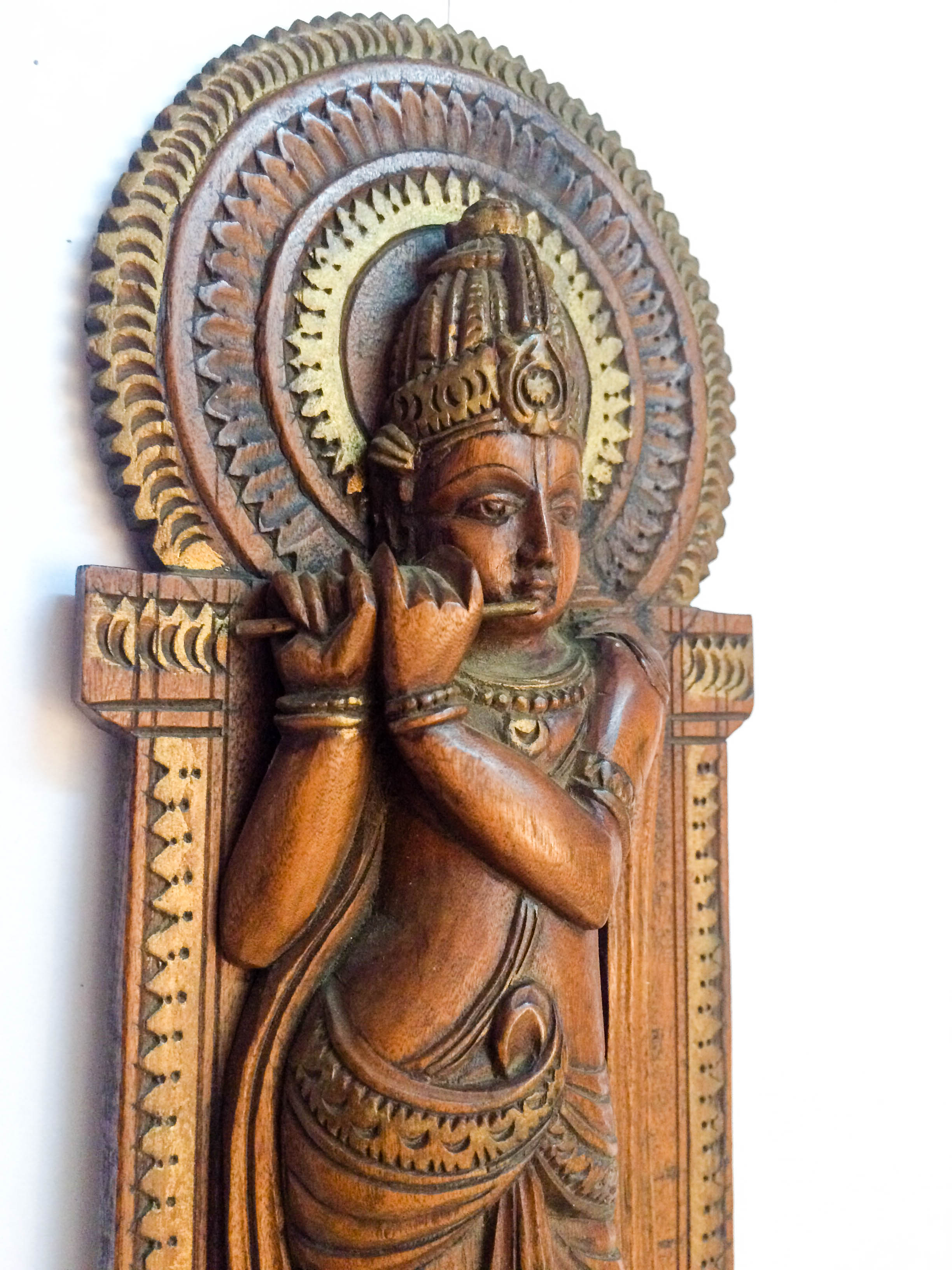
A venu is a musical instrument common in Krishna iconography

One of the oldest musical instruments of India, the instrument is a key-less transverse flute made of bamboo. The fingers of both hands are used to close and open the holes. It has a blowing hole near one end, and eight closely placed finger holes. The instrument comes in various sizes. The venu is also a highly respected instrument and those who play it are expected to appreciate it, for it is considered a gift to be able to play it.

The venu is capable of producing two and half octaves with the help of over-blowing and cross fingering. The flute is like the human voice in that it is monophonic and also has a typical two and half octave sound reproduction. Sliding the fingers on and off the holes allows for production of variety of gamakas, important in the performance of raga-based music.

== History ==
The flute (venu) finds great mention in Indian mythology and folklore having been listed as among the three original instruments meant for music along with the human voice and the veena (vaani-veena-venu).

The venu is associated with the Hindu god Krishna, who is often depicted playing it. This kind of flute is mainly used in South India. Vishnu is portrayed as Venugopala, playing the flute of creation.

The venu had not been a part of the Carnatic classical music until the pioneering innovations of Shri Sarabha Sastri and later revisions and updates on his design by Shri T.R. Mahalingam (fondly called Flute Mali). Due to the underlying physics of sound production, flutes have a natural "cut" or a discontinuity when going from the lowest note to the highest note. This discontinuity appears between the notes "ga" and "ma" on a Carnatic flute and between "Ma" and "Pa" for a Hindustani flute (mainly because of the fingering technique differences). In order to adapt the flute to Carnatic Music, certain modifications were necessary such as the addition of the 7th hole, usage of thicker walled bamboos, the technique of lifting the head to change the angle of embouchure when shifting between "ga" and "ma" notes. These innovations enabled artists to perform the Carnatic ragas with all the necessary gamakas and ornamentations without losing the "Bhaava" of the raga.

== Difference between bansuri and venu ==
Often beginners in India find themselves in a dilemma on what kind of flute to begin playing on as India has two distinct kinds of transverse flutes. They are the bansuri (North Indian bamboo flute) and the venu (South Indian bamboo flute). The main differences between these two are the raw material, construction and style of playing.

Raw material preferred for making the South Indian venu is usually thicker and denser and grows in Kerala or southern Tamil Nadu. It is darker and produces clear and rich mellow tone. The material used in Bansuri is mostly thin walled bamboo (but longer in length and diameter). It is lighter in color and produces a light airy tone (it is called jawaari). This bamboo grows in Assam (Silchar). There are also other varieties that are used, including bamboos that grow in the region of Sirsi, North Karnataka, Bihar.

Venu is constructed with eight playing holes and one blowing hole. Of these eight playing holes, seven are actually used for playing and the last finger hole is used in tuning. The bansuri has six playing holes and one blowing hole. There have been certain artists that have experimented with an additional pancham hole (thumb hole to achieve the note Pa) and Teevra ma hole at the end. However, standard bansuri usually only have six holes. These differences are mainly to accommodate the different styles of music that are played on it.

The Sa on the venu is achieved by closing the top two finger holes. On a bansuri the top three finger holes are closed to achieve this note. The way the notes are played is also slightly different. Carnatic music emphasizes the "gayaki style" or "the style of imitating the human voice". Hence the usage of gamakas and andolans require a nimble hold and a way to bend the notes smoothly on a Venu. Bansuri is more suited to Hindustani style of music due to its importance on long sustained notes and fast taans. These two instruments serve different styles of music and hence the difference in playing and construction.

== Flute sizes and pitches ==
The flute pitch is usually marked on the blowing end. It is denoted either in numbers on a Venu from 1 to 7 with or without (1/2, indicating one semitone higher) or as per the standard Pitch letters on a Bansuri from A to G with or without (#-Sharps/b-Flats). The size varies up to 12 sizes in length, each providing different pitches. The diameter of the flute also varies based on the pitch. With Lower octaves the diameter and length of flute increase, whereas in case of Higher octaves, the diameter and length of the flute is smaller.

There are many custom sized flutes available. Some flutes even go beyond 1 meter length. There is no limit in the imagination of these kind of flute constructions. Few examples are Double contrabass flute, Contrabass flute and Anahat Venu, which can go up to 12 feet.

Even a PVC pipe can be used to construct a flute in a very simple way, simply using common scissors.

== Making the first sound ==
In order to get an initial sound out of the flute, one can blow air into the embouchure hole. This technique is common for all transverse flutes such as the Western flute, the Bansuri, the Chinese Dizi flute etc.

== Musical notes ==
Basic 8 Notes playing with full hole closing/opening

Playing includes a Musical Scale or Sargam, which usually has 7 notes Sa, Re, Ga, Ma, Pa, Dha, Ni; in Hindustani Classical Music. In Carnatic Music, the swaras are denoted as per the Melakarta System.

The Transition from Ga to Pa is an essential aspect which is to be practiced appropriately under the Guidance of a Flute Teacher.

The blowing intensity needs to be changed carefully without distorting the sound.

Extreme strong blows allow the artist to even play few extra notes beyond the range the flute (some times leads to whistle sound).

Angling the flute against the blowing hole, allows the artist to modify and fine tune a note to the original pitch. While blowing the air, the artist can choose either continuous blowing or non-continuous blowing or even use the tough/lips to vibrate the air to play the music.

== Half finger closed musical notes ==
The artist can use the finger to close the hole half or quarter or three quarter to make different sounds, even though the sound does not falls in the standard keyboard but it is up to the imagination of the music artist to make those sounds.

This technique allows the artist to play almost 30+ notes in one flute. As a standard the black keys in a keyboard can be sounded in a flute with half finger closed on the corresponding hole.

Slow opening and slow closing the hole allows the music curves/pitching to move between one note to another note while continuously blowing, even two/three fingers can be slow closed and slow opened while continuously blowing. This sound curving technique produces the gamak characteristic of Carnatic music.

This technique allows the artist to play like a Song of male from the bird Asian koel. This can be related to hard pressing the Veena string to get the bending/pitching note or using a Pitch Wheel in an Electronic/MIDI keyboard.

== Venu players ==
sound samples
Carnatic 8-hole flute pitch E

=== Of the past ===
- Palladam Sanjiva Rao (1882-1962), a disciple of Sharaba Shastri.
- H. Ramachandra Shastry (1906 - 1992), a disciple of Palladam Sanjiva Rao.
- T. R. Mahalingam (1926-1986), a child venuist prodigy who started playing the flute at the age of five years. He is most popularly known as "Mali" or sometimes "Flute Mali."
- T.K.Radhakrishnan (1919-2003)
- T. Viswanathan (1927-2002), grandson of Veena Dhanammal and brother of Balasaraswati
- B.N.Suresh, (1946-1990) disciple of T.R.Mahalingam
- Prapancham Sitaram (d.2014)
- N. Kesi (1918-2015)
- N Ramani (1934-2015), disciple of T.R.Mahalingam
- A.V.Prakash
- Sikkil Sisters - Kunjumani & Neela

=== Of the present ===
- K. Bhaskaran (b. 1961)
- B. Shankar Rao (1922 - 2020)
- T. S. Sankaran (1930 - 2015)
- K. S. Gopalakrishnan (b. 1948)
- Guruvayoor S. Srikishnan ( 1933- 2019) (1936 - 2019)
- Tiruchy L. Saravanan
- Thiagarajan Ramani (b. 1962)
- Sikkil Mala Chandrasekar (b. 1963)
- Kudamaloor Janardanan (b.1969)
- Raman Kalyan
- Shashank Subramanyam (b.1978)

== See also ==
- Bansuri
- Carnatic Music
- Hindustani Music
- Bamboo musical instruments
- Wind instrument
