= Mysore Srikanth =

Indian musical artist

Mysore V. Srikanth
- Genre: Carnatic music
- Occupation: violinist
- Instrument: violin

Mysore V. Srikanth is an Indian Carnatic violinist and the sibling of Carnatic flautist Raman Kalyan, who has also accompanied him on various concerts.

== Career ==
Mysore Srikanth, a disciple of Vidwan H. K. Narasimha Murthy of Mysore, follows the Parur style of fingering. He started learning violin at a very young age and has undergone rigorous training for more than twenty years. Srikanth has been giving performances since he was fifteen years old. He has gained experience by accompanying top Artists like R.K.Srikantan, Dr.M.Balamuralikrishna, T. N. Seshagopalan, T. V. Sankaranarayanan, O. S. Thiagarajan, Trichur Ramachandran, Hyderabad Brothers, Yesudas, K. S. Gopalakrishnan, Rudrapatnam Brothers, Gayathri Venkataraghavan, Bombay Sisters, Sudha Raghunathan & others and received their blessings and appreciation. He has performed with Mridangam stalwarts like Palghat Sri Raghu, T. K. Murthy, Guru Karaikkudi Mani, Guruvayur Dorai, Vellore Ramabhadran, Umayalpuram Sivaraman, Tiruvarur Bhaktavatsalam, SrimushnamRajarao and many others. Srikanth has been featured in several prestigious Music Sabhas and Organizations throughout the country.

== Awards and titles ==
Srikanth, graded artist of AIR & Doordarshan, performs regularly for All India Radio, Doordarshan and other TV channels. He has also performed for National Program of Music of Doordarshan. & All India Radio. He has recorded many commercial CDs & cassettes with many great artists. He is a recipient of Cultural Talent Search Scholarship of Government of India and has achieved Distinction in the Senior Grade Music Examination.

He was adjudged as the Best Violinist by:

1. Krishna Gana Sabha - 1995
2. The Indian Fine Arts Society (Sub- Senior category) -- Dec 2000 Music Season
3. Karnataka Gana Kala Parishath – Young Musicians’ Conference – 2001
4. The Music Academy (Madras) - Dec 2002 Music Season
5. The Indian Fine Arts Society –Dec 2007 –Best Senior Violinist
6. The Indian Fine Arts Society –Dec 2008 –Best Senior Violinist

Srikanth has been conferred with the title "Kala Praveen" in Feb 2002 at Bangalore. He has been honored with the "Ananya Yuva Puraskar" award for young musicians in 2004 by the organization "Ananya" of Bangalore. Srikanth has traveled abroad widely to the U.S., Australia, New Zealand, Dubai, Singapore, Qatar, U.K., Canada and many European countries with Rudrapatnam Brothers, T. N. Seshagopalan, Ranjani-Gayatri, Malladi Brothers, V. K. Raman, T. V. Ramprasadh, Bombay Jayashri, Abhishek Raghuram, Aruna Sairam, Shashank and others.
