= Sikkil =

Sikkil is an Indian unisex given name that may refer to

- Sikkil Sisters, Indian flute players
- Sikkil Gurucharan (born 1982), Indian Carnatic musician, grandson of Kunjumani & Neela
- Sikkil Mala Chandrasekar (born 1963), Indian flute player, daughter of Neela
- Sikkil R. Bhaskaran (born 1936), Indian violinist
