= Sarabha Sastri =

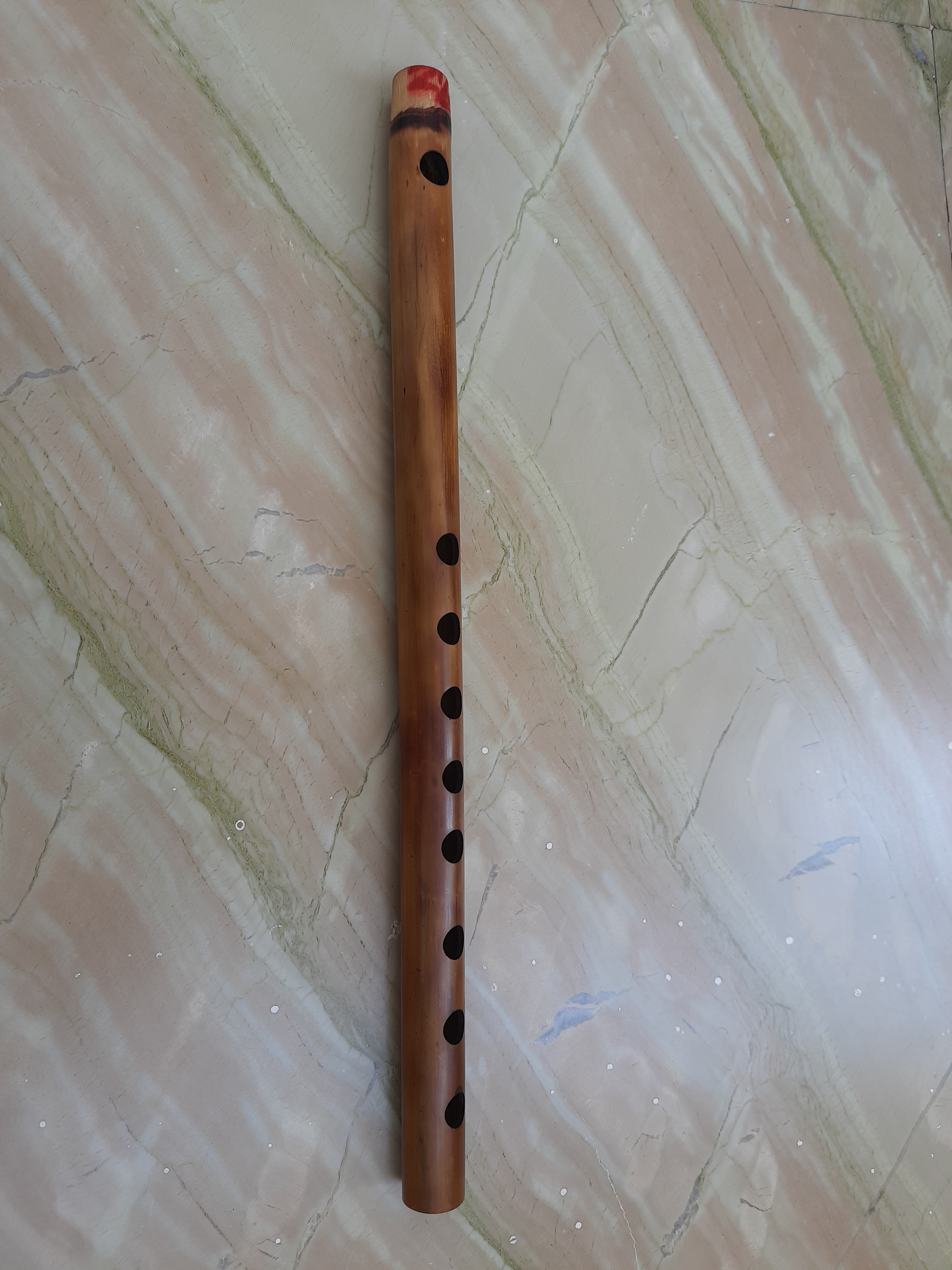
South Indian carnatic flute

Sri Sarabha Sastri (1872–1904) was an Indian venu flute player, known as the first great Brahmin flutist. He brought the flute to the mainstream Indian Carnatic concert stage – until then, it was almost exclusively a folk instrument. He was promoted with popularising the flute as a primary instrument.

== Early life and background ==
Sri Sarabha Sastrigal was born in 1872 to Viswanatha Sastri and Smt. Dharmambal. His mother's native place was Tiruvadi and She lived next door to Saint Tyagaraja. His father died when he and his brother (Rao Sahib) Sivakumara Sastri were very young. Blind at a young age, he was initiated into a career in music under the guidance of his maternal uncle Sri Kuppusamy Sastri of Tiruvadi near Thiruvaiyaru and later by Manambuchavadi Venkatasubbayyar, one of the leading disciples of Saint Tyagaraja. Sri Govinda Nayanakkar unravelled the mysteries of flute to young Sarabha Sastri. Sri Saraba Saastri lived in Soliappa Mudali street in Kumbakonam and was married to Ambu Ammal.

== Penance at Eraharam ==
Sastri undertook penance in ErAharam -Sri Sankari Samedha Skandanadha Swamy temple. Later, he organised "Sarba Kavadi", " Macha Kavadi" etc. and spread the fame of this temple. Carrying kavadi is a practice of penance or prayaschittam. Thaipusam is a festival that is marked by acts of penance such as carrying the Kavadi. The Kavadi itself is a physical burden through which the devotees implore for help from deity.

== Achievements ==
Sastri evolved a fingering technique by which he could produce the entire range of Indian ragas on it.

Sri Sarabha Sastrigal composed more than 500 Sahityas for Nayanmar charithrams, in various languages.

Sri Saraba Saastrigal taught a unique technique in playing the Flute (with Tu-Tu kaarams). He was also able to play the Thaanam on the Flute. Sri Saraba Saastrigal was also called "Eka Chandra Graahi", due to an apparent ability to grasp anything by just listening once. Palladam Sanjiva Rao was a direct disciple of Sri Saraba Saastrigal. Palladam Sanjiva Rao passed this on to H Ramachandra Shastry who taught Carnatic flute at Kalakshetra until 1992. Some of the notable musicians practising this art form include G. S. Rajan, Ludwig Pesch and T. Sashidhar.

== Origin of the Carnatic Flute ==
Until the late 19th century, the Carnatic flute (better known in Tamil as the pullanguzhal), an 8-hole bamboo flute, the South Indian equivalent of the North Indian 6-hole bansuri flute, had never been used in Carnatic concerts. Sharaba Shastri has been characterised by his followers as a musical genius after experimenting and creating the Carnatic flute. He is also known for bringing the Carnatic flute to the fore of Carnatic music concerts as an influential instrument. The Sharaba Shastri style or bani of playing was established and was carried on by his disciple Sanjeeva Rao. However it was the self-taught "Mali" who brought a revolution in popularising the Carnatic flute and whose legacy was carried on by Ramani and other national and international disciples of Mali.

The fingering technique invented by Sarabha Shastri was as highly scientific, and as accurate as a keyboard. The minutest oscillations required for the intricate gamakas of Carnatic music were covered by this fingering system. By progressing from playing only simple tunes to the ability of producing full-fledged kritis complete with the nuances of every raga, the flute came on par with the veena as a concert instrument. No recordings of his playing survive, and apart from stray references in larger works, little has been written about his music. We only know his music through his student, Palladam Sanjiva Rao.

== Sanskrit Scholar ==
Sastri was a scholar and used to have discussions with other scholars such as Thirupalanam Panchapakesa Sastrigal, Sulamangalam Vaidyanatha Bhagavathar and others. Music scholars such as Thirukodikaval Krishna Iyer, "Fiddle" Govindasamy Pillai, Pattanam Subramaniya Iyer, Thanjavur Krishna Bhagavathar, Mridangam Narayanaswamy Appa, Mridangam Azhaga Nambi Pillai, Kumbakonam Sivakolundu and Tirumarugal Natesa Nayakarar were his contemporaries and used to accompany him in his concerts.

== Death ==
Sri Sarabha Sastrigal died at the age of 32 years in 1904 at Kumbakonam.

== Sastri's Flute ==
The flute he handled is on display at Sri Rama Bhajanai Sabha at 110, Solaippan Street, Kumbakonam. Sri Sarabha Sastrigal's flute has been preserved for more than 100 years by Sastri's family members.

== Venuganam Sri Sarabha Sastrigal Memorial Trust ==
A trust under the name and style of "Venuganam Sri Sarabha Sastrigal Memorial Trust" has been formed and functioning, organising music, cultural and service-oriented programs, and the trust is managed by leading personalities. Ekadasi Bhajans and Radha Kalyanam are conducted fortnightly, during the month of Margazhi.

== Sri Rama Bhajanai Sabha ==
Sastri offered himmusic as worship to Lord Rama. Sri Rama Navami uthsavam was performed by him every year which used to be attended by all the leading musicians of those days. This tradition is continued until today by group of enthusiasts.

Sri Rama Bhajanai Sabha, Kumbakonam, was founded by Venuganam Sarabha Sastrigal approximately 125 years ago. The organisation is active in cultural and religious activities, including annual celebrations of Sri Rama Navami Utsavams and Sri Radha Kalyana Mahotsavam, observances of Sri Kanchi Kamakoti Peetam Maha Periyava Jayanthi, bhajans on Ekadasi days, lectures on the Srimad Valmiki Ramayana and Bhagavatham, and community services including Annadhanams during festivals. (A blogspot maintained by the organisation contains articles published about Sarabha Sastrigal since 1904.)
