= K. S. Gopalakrishnan (musician) =

Indian carnatic flute player (born 1948)

K. S. Gopalakrishnan (born 1948) is an Indian carnatic flute player.

== Early life ==
He was born on 1st September 1948 in Kerala. He first learned under his father Shri K. Sankaranarayana Iyer who introduced him to Carnatic classical music.

== Career ==
Gopalakrishnan continued under Sri K. Raghava Variyar of Thiruvananthapuram. He has performed all over India and played on many music festivals. He won several awards including the Kerala Sangeeta Natak Akademi Award and the Veena Sheshanna National Award. He has a widely range of krithis and varnams. Gopalakishnan is well respected by many top musicians from India including and his Flute playing was mostly inspired his senior N. Ramani. He was a staff artist at All India Radio Thiruvananthapuram.

== Awards ==
- 1999: Kerala Sangeetha Nataka Akademi Award
