= Thongophone =

Percussion instrument

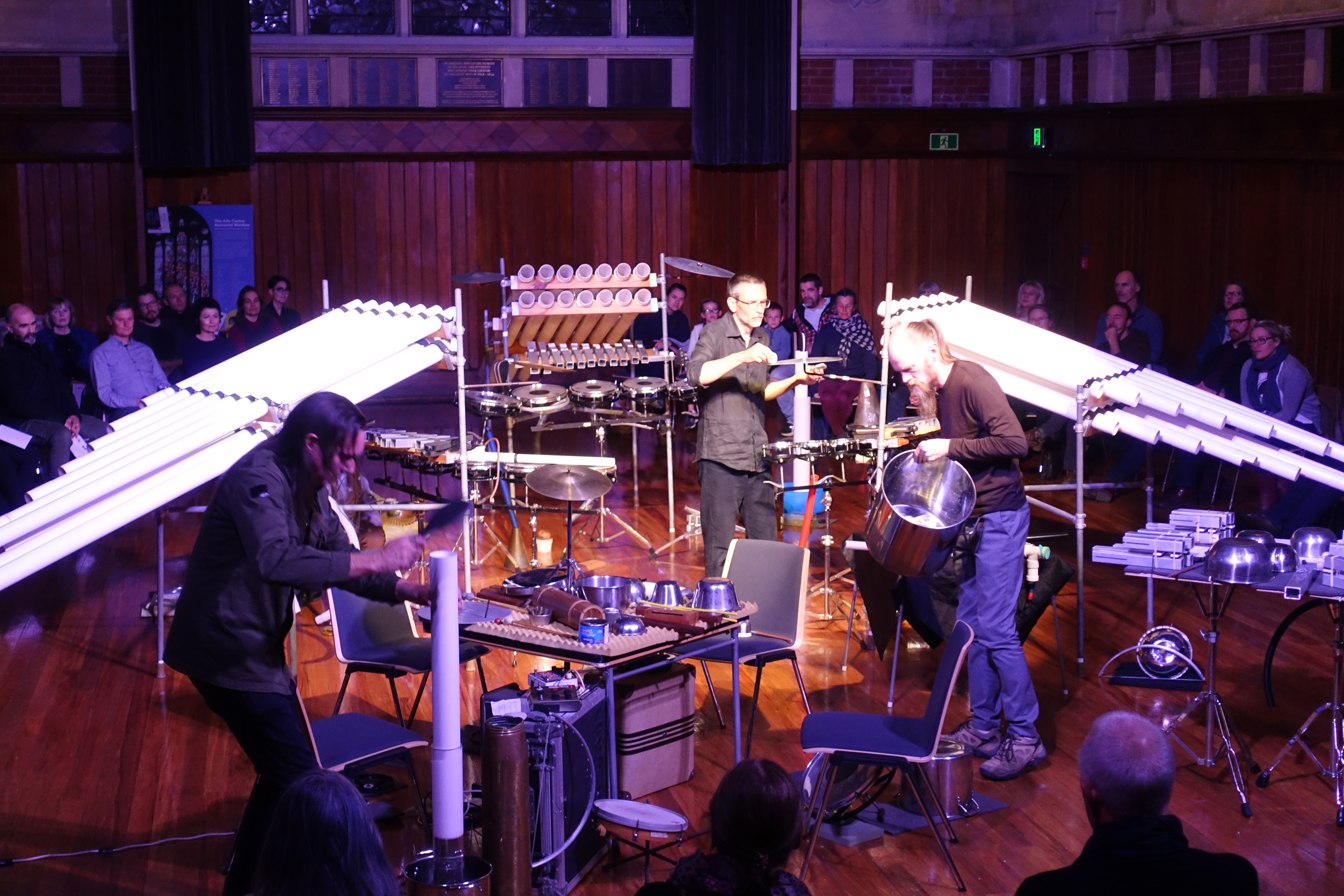
New Zealand percussion group From Scratch in concert, 2020, with three thongophones visible behind the players

A thongophone is a musical instrument classified as a percussion instrument and a plosive aerophone. Playing the thongophone is somewhat rare in Western music for solo performance, but was brought to prominence by the music of Yanni and Blue Man Group (who play many original variants including the tubulum), among others. Thongophones are found in rural Papua New Guinea.

The thongophone produces sound by striking a rubber clapper, usually a thong (flip-flop), hence its namesake, against the opening of one of many PVC pipes of varying length. Vibrations are transmitted through the hollow pipes, each one resonating to a preset pitch. The tubing system that allows the instrument to generate its sounds, resembles a pipe organ, which works on the same principle; however, the resonance is generated using a more direct method. In standard thongophones, there is a standard pitch designated for each tube; however the variable pitch thongophone, or drumbone, was made widely known due to its use by Blue Man Group, as seen in the Intel Pentium 4 commercials. The thongophone can also be played with the use of drumsticks, or virtually any other solid stick-like object to create resonance in the tube.

On the instrument, one end of each pipe is set up to resemble the layout of a standard piano in that the natural notes are at the front, C, D, E, F, G, A, B and so on, with the Accidental notes, C♯/D♭, D♯/E♭, F♯/G♭, G♯/A♭ and A♯/B♭ above them in groups of 2 and 3, just as in a piano or a xylophone.
