= Raman Kalyan =

- Also known as: V. K. Raman
- Genres: Carnatic, Instrumental
- Occupations: Flautist, Composer
- Instrument: Flute
- Website: www.ramankalyan.com

Raman Kalyan, also known as V. K. Raman and as Flute Raman, is an Indian Carnatic flute player.

== Early life and background ==
Raman started learning the flute from Vidwan A. V. Prakash at the age of 9 and performed his first concert at the age of 15 in Mysore. He later underwent advanced training from Dr. N. Ramani. Raman has performed along with Dr. Ramani on numerous occasions.

== Performances ==
Raman's music blends the Carnatic style steeped in tradition along with modern techniques on the flute. Raman has been appreciated by connoisseurs for his melodic rendition, purity of notes, unique elucidation of ragas with tonal purity and perfect pitch alignment. Raman has performed at major venues all around the world. He has received several awards, such as Best Flautist twice by the prestigious Madras Music Academy, India.

== Teaching ==
Raman is passionate about teaching the art to others. He has established the Indo-American Academy of Classical Music (IAACM). IAACM is devoted to promoting Indian Classical music in the USA and Canada by organizing concerts by reputed musicians from India, by providing orchestral support for dance performances and conducting instrumental and vocal classes for beginners and advanced students. Raman also imparts music education around the globe using modern technology such as video conferencing. In particular, he brings state of the art Carnatic music education to the United States of America.

== Collaboration ==
=== Jugalbandi ===
Raman has performed Jugalbandi concerts with leading Hindustani artists such as Grammy Winner Pandit Vishwamohan Bhatt, Ustad Shahid Pervez, Pandit Debi Prasad Chatterjee, Pandit Nayan Ghosh, Nanda Kishore Muley, Gaurav Majumdar, Anupama Bhagwat, and Anindo Chatterjee.

=== Dance ===
Raman Kalyan has collaborated with leading dance gurus and artists, including the Dhananjayans, C. V. Chandrasekhar, Adayar K. Lakshman and Manju Bhargavi. He also leads orchestra teams with leading musicians for arangetrams of several young dancers every year.

=== Jazz ===
Raman has collaborated with World Music and Jazz musicians including Grammy Winner Dave Liebman, Dr. L. Subramaniam, Louis Banks, John Beaseley, Darryl Jones, Nicholas Payton, Adam Holzman, Rudresh Mahanthappa, Ndugu Chancler, V. Selvaganesh, Charlie Mariano, Rama Mani, Ranjit Barrot, Karl Peters and world-renowned percussionists such as Jamie Haddod, Glen Velez and Lenny White. Raman has performed as a featured artist for the Miles From India band.

=== Films ===
Raman has recorded for the Kannada film industry for a short while.

=== Carnatic ===
Raman has shared the stage with Carnatic music legends such as Mangalampalli Balamuralikrishna Nedenuri Krishnamurthy u Srinivas. and famous violinists like Arun Ramamurthy Mysore Karthik, Mysore v Srikanth. Many percussion maestros like Arjun Kumar, Akshay Anantapadmanabhan, Srimushnam V Raja Rao, H S Sudhindra, Giridhar Udupa, N Amrit, Bangalore V Praveen have accompanied him.

== Discography ==
Raman has released more than 50 albums, with several of them best sellers on iTunes. Some of the albums are listed below.

- Mohana Rama
- Swara Raga Sudha
- Magic Bamboo
- Divine Melodies
- Sur Milan (Sagar Music, with Dr. Suma Sudhindra on the Veena)
- Sur Sangam (Sagar Music, with Nanda Kishore Muley on Santoor)
- Classical Indian Flute (Inner Splendor Media, 2007)
- Classical Indian Flute & Violin With Virtuoso Brothers V.K. Raman and Mysore V. Srikanth (Inner Splendor Media, 2008)
- Classical Indian Flute and Violin Vol. II With Virtuoso Brothers V.K. Raman and Mysore V. Srikanth (Inner Splendor Media, 2008)
- Confluence (Felmay, 2009)
- Classical Indian Flute & Violin With Virtuoso Brothers V.K. Raman and Mysore V. Srikanth
- Navarasa - Eternal Emotions
