= N. Ramani =

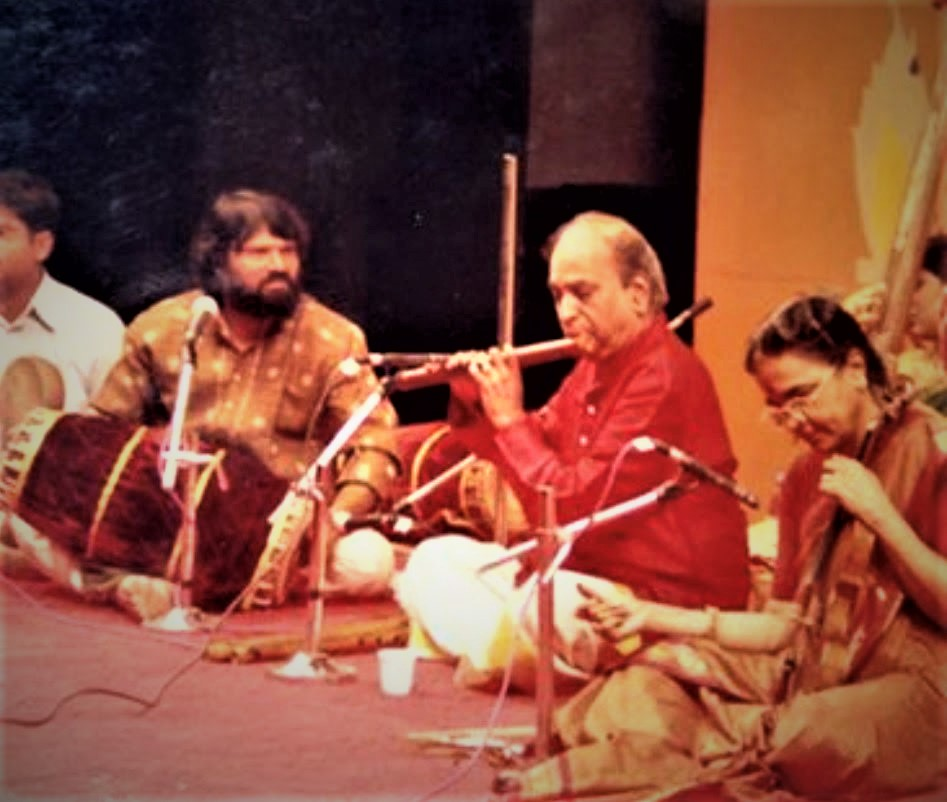
- N Ramani in a concert with N Rajam and T S Nandakumar in Bombay

Background information
- Born: 15 October 1934; Tiruvarur, Madras Presidency, British India (now Tamil Nadu, India)
- Died: 9 October 2015 (aged 80) Chennai, Tamil Nadu, India
- Genre: Carnatic music
- Occupation: Carnatic instrumentalist
- Instrument: Venu flute
- Years active: 1939–2015

Natesan Ramani (15 October 1934 – 9 October 2015), commonly known as N. Ramani or N. Flute Ramani, was an Indian Carnatic flautist. He was awarded the Madras Music Academy's Sangeetha Kalanidhi in 1996. Ramani is also credited with introducing the long flute into Carnatic music.

== Early life and background ==
Ramani was born in Tiruvarur, a city in Tamil Nadu associated with the Trinity of Carnatic music, the Carnatic composer trio of Tyagaraja, Muthuswami Dikshitar, and Syama Sastri. Ramani was born into a family of flautists. Ramani first learnt music from his grandfather, Sri Aazhiyur Narayanaswami Iyer, a well known flute artist and singer himself. Aware of young Ramani's keen interest in the Carnatic flute, Ramani's initiation to Carnatic music began at the age of five.

Ramani performed his first concert at the age of 8. The turning point in Ramani's career was when he became a disciple of his maternal uncle and eminent flautist, the late T. R. Mahalingam (known more commonly as "Flute Mali"), who first popularised the Carnatic flute in Indian music. By the age of 11 years, his first concert was held at Singaravelavar Temple, Sikkil, near Nagapattinam, Tamil Nadu. His mother Smt Sarathambal was instrumental in bringing him to notice. She accompanied him for his concerts when he was studying at Boys High School Tiruvarur. Ramani accompanied his guru T. R. Mahalingam in a concert for the first time. N Ramani is related to Sikkil Sisters, his contemporary flute-playing duo.

== Career ==
In 1945, Ramani performed his first concert on All India Radio. Following Ramani's first concert at the Madras Music Academy in 1956, at the age of 22, Ramani had reached the highest point in his career and become an artist of international fame, and his concerts became a regular feature.

=== Disciples ===
Ramani started the "Ramani Academy of Flute", and has trained more than 100 disciples. namely:

sl.no	Disciple	Details
1	Bagyalakshmi A N	Performing for the past 45 years various carnatic Solo concerts and for various Bharathanatya accompaniment
2	Chitoor Raghavaraman	NRI Flautist at London performing for various Dance Concerts and training students for Flute and Vocal.
3	Chitoor Srinivasan	
4	Gopi Ganesh Brothers	
5	Karthikeyan V	
6	Karthikeyan K	
7	Mukund L V	
8	Nandhini Harish	
9	Ramakrishnan B	
10	Ramakrishnan.N (Ramji)	
11	Rangarajan V	
12	Ranjani Narasimhan	
13	Rukmani Teacher	
14	Subramanian K R	
15	Thiagarajan Ramani	Son of N. Ramani. Also plays kanjira and violin.
16	Tiruvarur Swaminathan	
17	Trichy Rangarajan	
18	Umashankar (Raja)	
19	Dr. Prapancham S Balachandran	‘A-Top’ graded flautist at All India Radio. Retired Station Director at AIR, Chennai. PhD in Music from Madras University.
20	Nandakumar	
21	Chaitanya Kumar	
22	Ajit Ranganathan	From Madurai, currently based in Bangalore.
23	B Gokul	Renowned Bharatanatyam accompanist and flautist at Bhagavata Mela Natya Nataka Sangam(Melattur)
24	MV Swaroop	Carnatic flautist who also plays jazz and rock on the bamboo flute
25	Nikhil Narayan	Brother of Vocalist Sandeep Narayan
26	Sathva Srinath	
27	A. V. Prakash	‘B high’ Grade Artist of All India Radio and Doordarshan.
28	R. Athul Kumar	Grandson of N. Ramani, ‘A’ Grade Artist of All India Radio and highly decorated flutist, Composer for many productions.
29	K. P. Upadhyaya	Renowned flautist from Mysuru, composed many pieces for AIR Mysuru

=== Tours ===
Ramani performed in all major states, sabhas and venues throughout India, as well as numerous destinations around the world, including the United States, Canada, France, Germany, Switzerland, Sri Lanka and other countries. He made more than 30 concert tours outside of India.

== Origin of the Carnatic flute ==
Until the late 19th century, the Carnatic flute (better known in Kannada as venu or murali or kolalu, in Telugu as pillanagrovi and in Tamil and Malayalam as pullanguzhal), an 8-hole bamboo flute, the South Indian equivalent of the North Indian 6-hole bansuri flute, had never been used in Carnatic concerts as a main instrument. Sharaba Shastri has been characterised by his followers as a musical genius after experimenting and creating the Carnatic flute. He is also known for bringing the Carnatic flute to the fore of Carnatic music concerts as an influential instrument.

The Sharaba Shastri style or bani of playing was established and was carried on by his disciple Sanjeeva Rao. However it was the self-taught "Mali" who brought a revolution in popularising the Carnatic flute and whose legacy was carried on by Ramani and other national and international disciples of Mali.

== Achievements ==
Although Palladam Sanjeeva Rao was Sharaba Shastri's successor, it was "Mali" and N. Ramani who brought international attention to the Carnatic flute both in their own distinct flute playing techniques, with the latter improving on the former's methods.

He did so by studying the long bass flutes of the North Indian bansuri genius, Pannalal Ghosh which the latter had incorporated successfully in Hindustani concerts. To further enhance tala dynamics, he followed the "GNB" style which was developed by the legendary G. N. Balasubramaniam. An interview with the Hindu

The "Mali" bani encompassed facial expressions such as slight tilting of the head, varied movement of the lips which produced the vocal effect in the Carnatic never explored before by Sharaba Shastri or Palladam Sanjeeva Rao.

According to Ramani, "Mali's teaching methods were worth emulating. A good teacher should be open to learning from his students too. Mali learnt Aahiri raga from me, which I had learnt from T. Vishwanathan, Balasaraswathi's brother".

In 1996, he gained the most prestigious title/award in Carnatic music, Sangeetha Kalanidhi.

== Honours and accolades ==
Ramani's performances in All India Radio (AIR) have received numerous praises from Hindustani and Carnatic musicians alike and his performances overseas had been recognised with numerous awards.

Some of the highlights include the Sangeetha Kalanidhi, awarded by the Music Academy in Chennai, Tamil Nadu, India, the Sangeetha Kalasikhamani award for the year 2007 given by The Indian Fine arts Society, Chennai, the Sangeetha Acharya award from Wasser College, US, the honorary citizenship status in Maryland, Ohio, US, and the Padma Shri Award from the President of India. He holds an honorary Cultural Doctorate from The World University of Arizona.

N. Ramani was conferred with Sangeet Natak Akademi Award in 1984 and Sangeet Natak Akademi Tagore Ratna in 2011.

== Death ==
Ramani suffered from throat cancer during the last years of his life, and did not appear in many programmes. He died on 9 October 2015 in Mylapore, less than a week before his 81st birthday. He was survived by four children, including Thiagarajan Ramani.

== Discography ==
Contributing artist

- The Rough Guide to the Music of India and Pakistan (1996, World Music Network)
