= Aerophone =

Musical instruments that are played by vibration of air

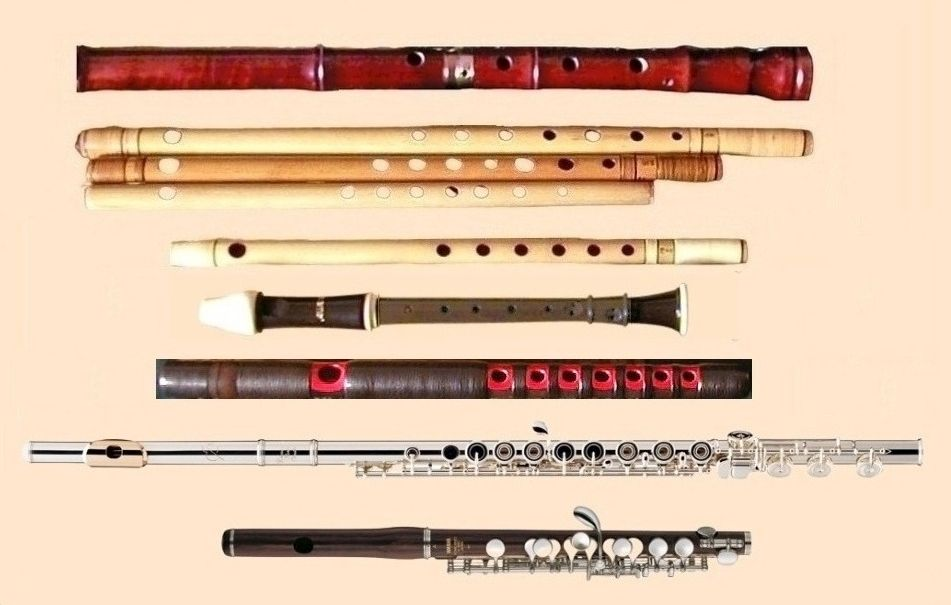
Flutes are aerophones.

An aerophone is a musical instrument that produces sound primarily by causing a body of air to vibrate, without the use of strings or membranes (which are respectively chordophones and membranophones), and without the vibration of the instrument itself adding considerably to the sound (or idiophones).

According to Curt Sachs:

Aerophones or 'air instruments' include what are usually called 'wind instruments,' with the addition of a few instruments with a different acoustical principle called 'free aerophones.'

A wind instrument has two essential factors: a tube enclosing a column of air, and a device for setting that air into vibration by interrupting into pulsations the steady breath of the player (or the wind of a bellows).

These may be lips, a mechanical reed, or a sharp edge. Also, an aerophone may be excited by percussive acts, such as the slapping of the keys of a flute or of any other woodwind. A free aerophone lacks the enclosed column of air yet, "cause a series of condensations and rarefications by various means."

== Overview ==
Aerophones are one of the four main classes of instruments in the original Hornbostel–Sachs system of musical instrument classification, which further classifies aerophones by whether or not the vibrating air is contained within the instrument. The first class (41) includes instruments which, when played, do not contain the vibrating air. The bullroarer is one example. These are called free aerophones. This class includes (412.13) free reed instruments, such as the harmonica, but also many instruments unlikely to be called wind instruments at all by most people, such as sirens and whips. The second class (42) includes instruments that contain the vibrating air when being played. This class includes almost all instruments generally called wind instruments — including the didgeridoo, (423) brass instruments (e.g., trumpet, french horn, baritone horn, tuba, trombone), and (421 & 422) woodwind instruments (e.g., oboe, flute, saxophone, clarinet). The wind factor is not only provided by the players' lungs function. The organ and the mouth harmonica are also aerophones, both supplied with free reeds, which are blown by a mechanical system.

Additionally, very loud and impulsive sounds can be made by explosions directed into, or being detonated inside of resonant cavities. Detonations inside the calliope (and steam whistle), as well as the pyrophone, might thus be considered as class 42 instruments, despite the fact that the "wind" or "air" may be steam or an air-fuel mixture.

Other cases of aerophones with impulsive sounds are the boomwhackers and the so-called thongophones, made up of cylindrical pipes that are struck on the sides (boomwhackers) or extremes (thongophones), thus generating percussive aerophonic tones.

== History ==
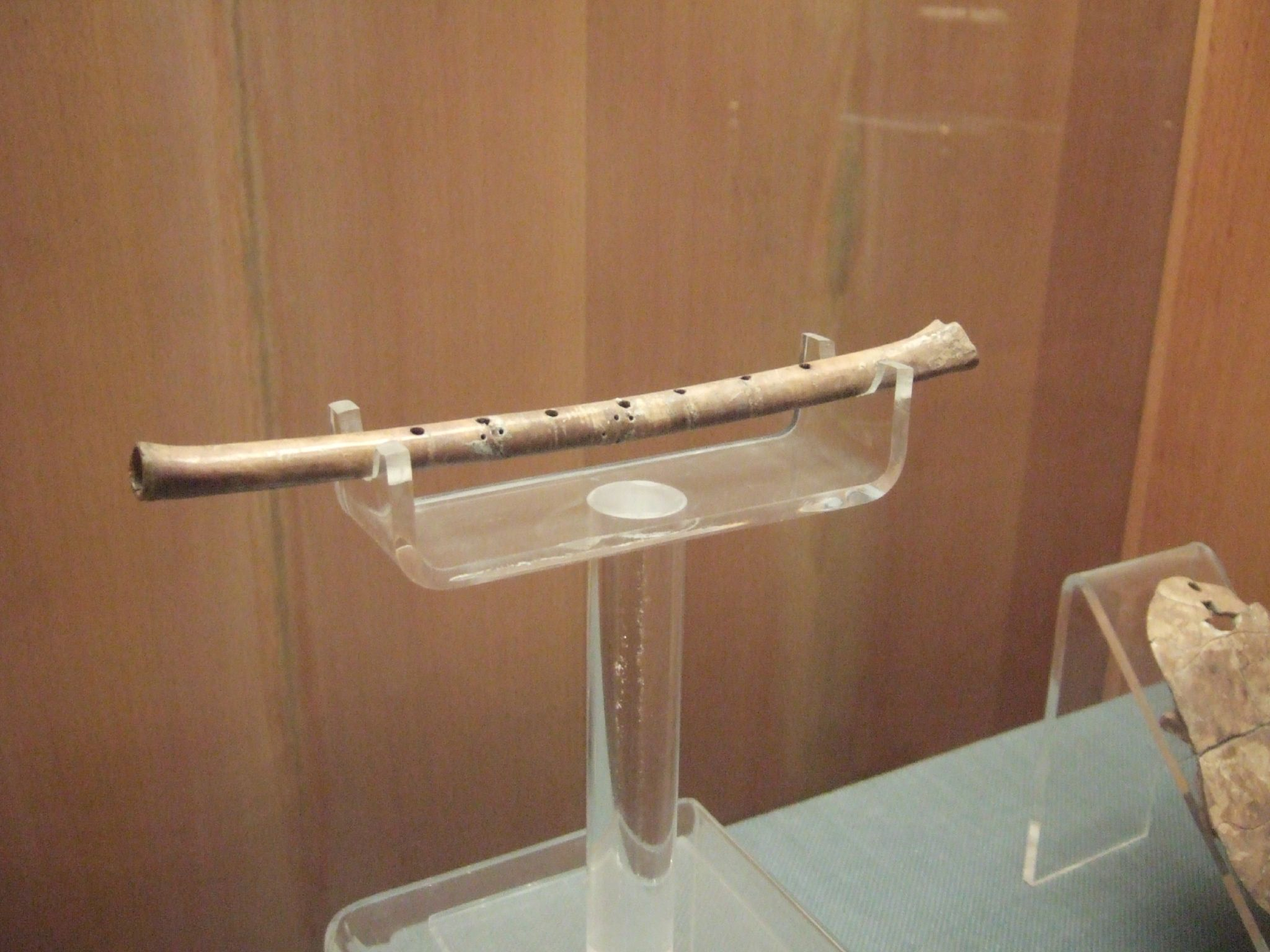
Neolithic bone flute

According to Ardal Powell, the flute is a simple instrument found in numerous ancient cultures. There are three legendary and archeologically verifiable birthplace sites of flutes: Egypt, Greece and India. Of these, the transverse flute (side-blown) appeared only in ancient India, while the fipple flutes are found in all three. It is likely, states Powell, that the modern Indian bansuri has not changed much since the early medieval era.

Identifying the origin of the aerophone is difficult, though it is believed that Americans and their descendants developed the largest diversity of aerophones, and they are understood to have been the major non-vocal, melodic instruments of Native America. Archaeological studies have found examples of globular flutes in ancient Mexico, Colombia and Peru, and multiple tubular flutes were common among the Maya and Aztec. The use of shells of Conches as an aerophone has also been found to be prevalent in areas such as Central America and Peru.

Examples of aerophone-type instruments in China can be dated back to the Neolithic period. Fragments of bone flutes can be found at the burial sites of the Jiahu settlements of ancient China, and they represent some of the earliest known examples of playable instruments. The instruments were typically carved from the wing bone of the red-crowned crane, and had five to eight holes. The flutes were efficient enough to produce sound in a nearly accurate octave, and are thought to have been used ceremonially or for ritualistic purposes. Examples of flutes made out of bamboo in China date back to 2nd Century BC. These flutes were known as Dizi's or simply Di (笛) and typically had 6 holes for playing melodies that were framed by scale-modes.

Flutes including the famous Bansuri, have been an integral part of Indian classical music since 1500 BC. A major deity of Hinduism, Krishna, has been associated with the flute. Some early flutes were made out of tibias (shin bones). The flute has also always been an essential part of Indian culture and mythology, and the cross flute is believed, by several accounts, to originate in India as Indian literature from 1500 BCE has made vague references to the cross flute.

== Types ==
=== Free ===
Free aerophones are instruments where the vibrating air is not enclosed by the instrument itself.

==== Displacement ====
The air-stream meets a sharp edge, or a sharp edge is moved through the air.

==== Interruptive ====
The air-stream is interrupted periodically.

==== Plosive ====
Also known as percussive aerophones, plosive aerophones are percussion instruments sounded by a single compression and release of air. An example of a plosive aerophone is the scraper flute which has tubes with ridged or serrated edges so that they can be scraped with a rod to produce sound.

Another example of a percussive aerophone is the so-called thongophone, consisting of a cylindrical pipe that is struck by a special mallet, somehow equivalent to a flip-flop (thong). A thongophone may sound like an open-open pipe if the mallet is quickly removed after striking the pipe's extreme. Also, it may sound as an open-closed pipe, if the mallet remains closing the pipe after the attack. In the first situation (open-open), the first resonance mode will have a wavelength that corresponds to two times the pipe length, approximately. It is called by acousticians as a "half-wavelength" air column. In the second situation (open-closed), the first resonance mode will have a wavelength that corresponds to four times the pipe length, approximately. Acousticians call it as "quarter-wavelength" air-column.

=== Non-free ===
Non-free aerophones are instruments where the vibrating air is contained within the instrument. Often called wind instruments, they are typically divided into two categories; Woodwind and Brass. It is widely accepted that wind instruments are not classified on the material from which they are made, as a woodwind instrument does not necessarily need to be made of wood, nor a brass instrument made of brass. Woodwind instruments are often made with wood, metal, glass or ivory, with examples being flute, oboe, bassoon, clarinet, recorder and the saxophone. Brass instruments are often made with silver, copper, ivory, horn, or even wood. Examples include the trumpet, cornet, horn, trombone and the tuba.

==== Flute ====
A flute is a type of aerophone, as is the Eunuch flute, also referred to as a mirliton. A flute is an aerophone or reedless wind instrument that produces its sound from the flow of air across an opening, usually a sharp edge. According to the instrument classification of Hornbostel–Sachs, flutes are categorized as edge-blown aerophones. Aside from the voice, flutes are the earliest known musical instruments. A number of flutes dating to about 43,000 to 35,000 years ago have been found in the Swabian Alb region of Germany. These flutes demonstrate that a developed musical tradition existed from the earliest period of modern human presence in Europe.

Flute aerophone examples

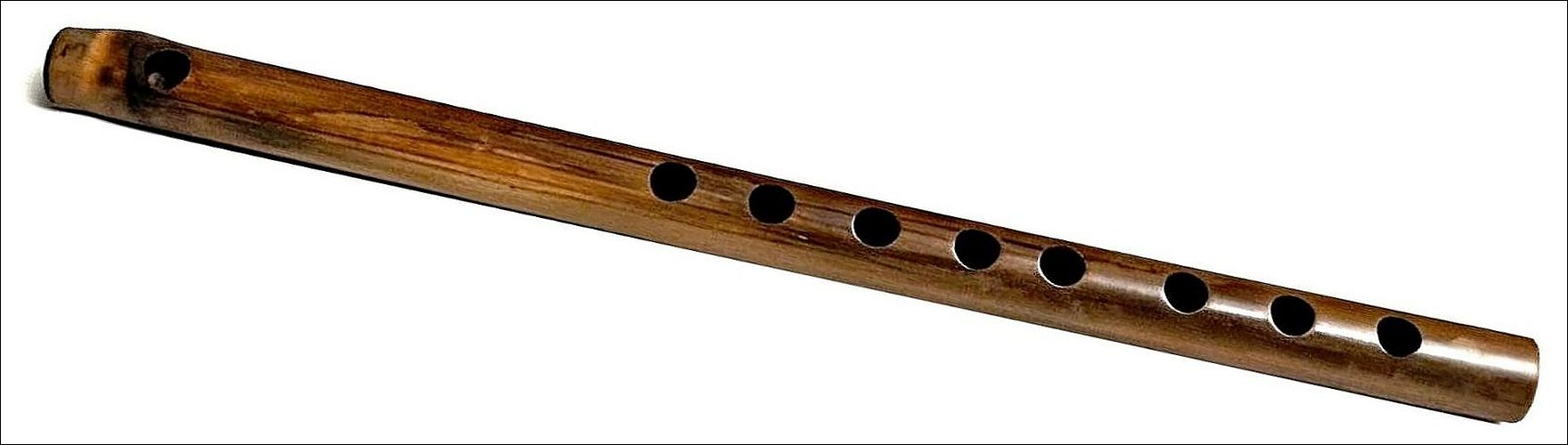
A Carnatic eight-holed bamboo flute

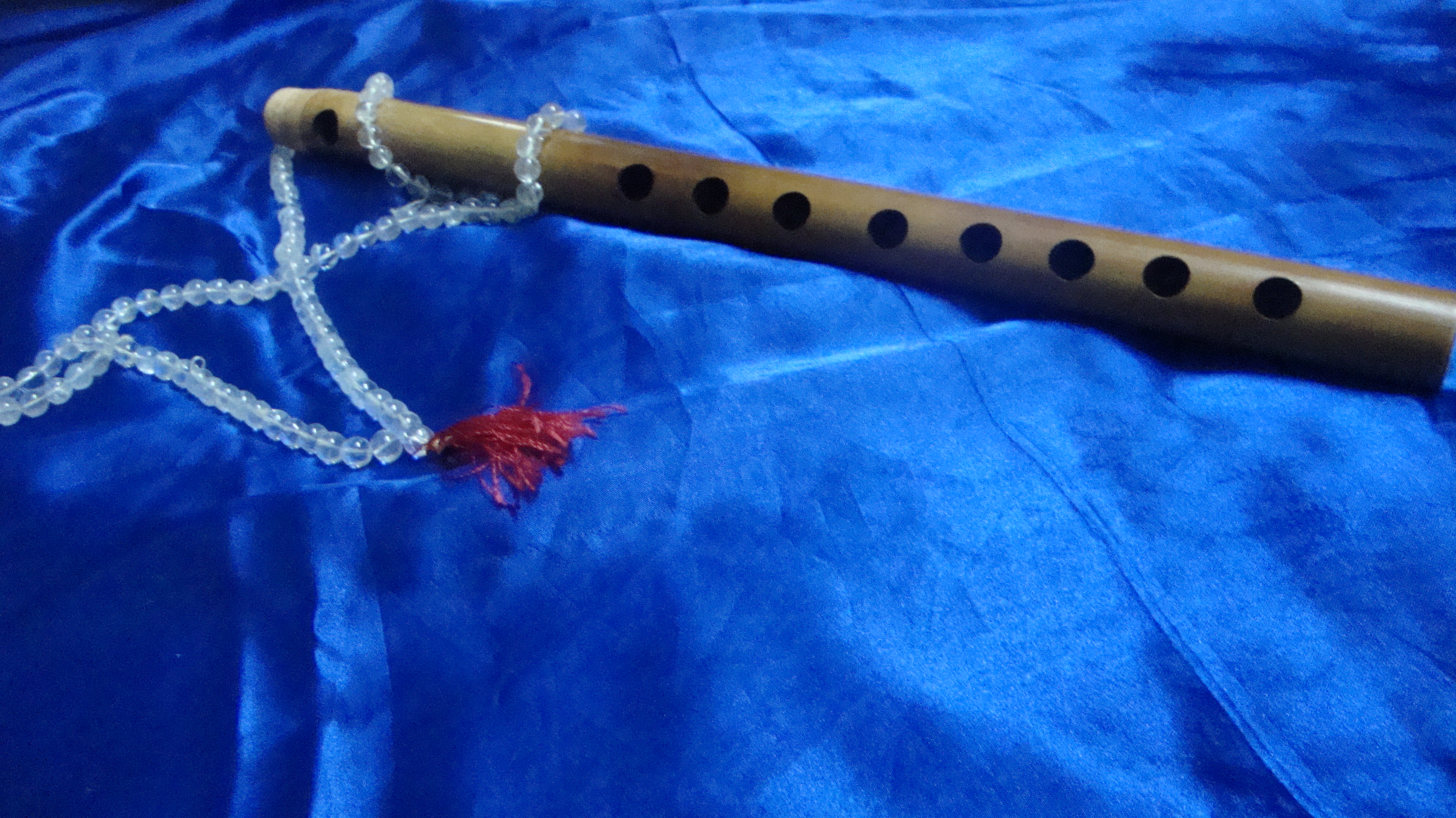
An eight-holed classical Indian bamboo flute.

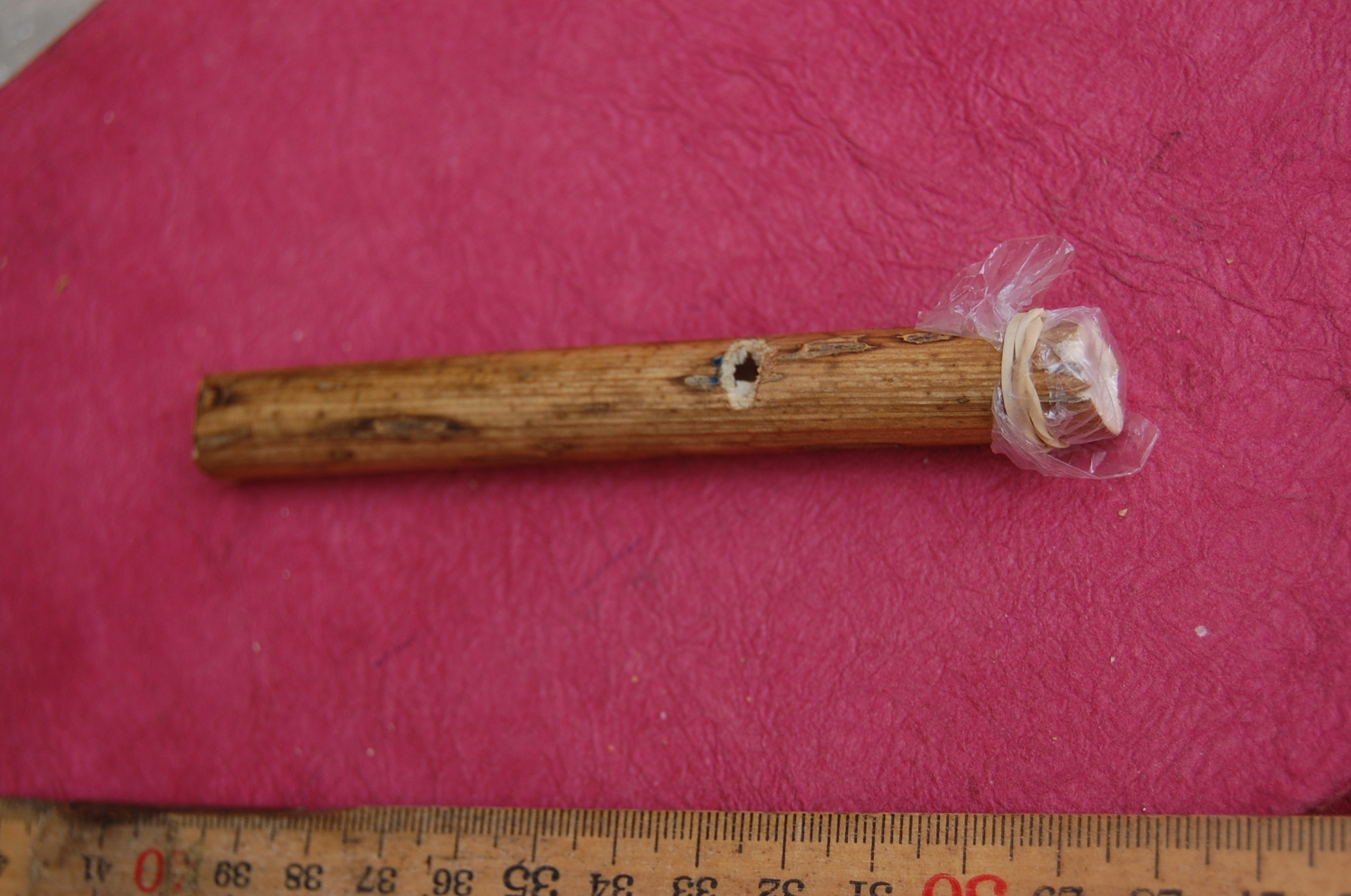
Example of a Eunuch flute

==== Reed ====
A reed aerophone is a musical instrument that produces sound by the player's breath being directed against a lamella or pair of lamellae which periodically interrupt the airflow and cause the air to be set in motion. Reed aerophones can be further subdivided into two distinct categories: single-reed and double-reed instruments. The former includes clarinets and saxophones, while examples of the latter are oboes and bassoons.

Reed aerophone examples

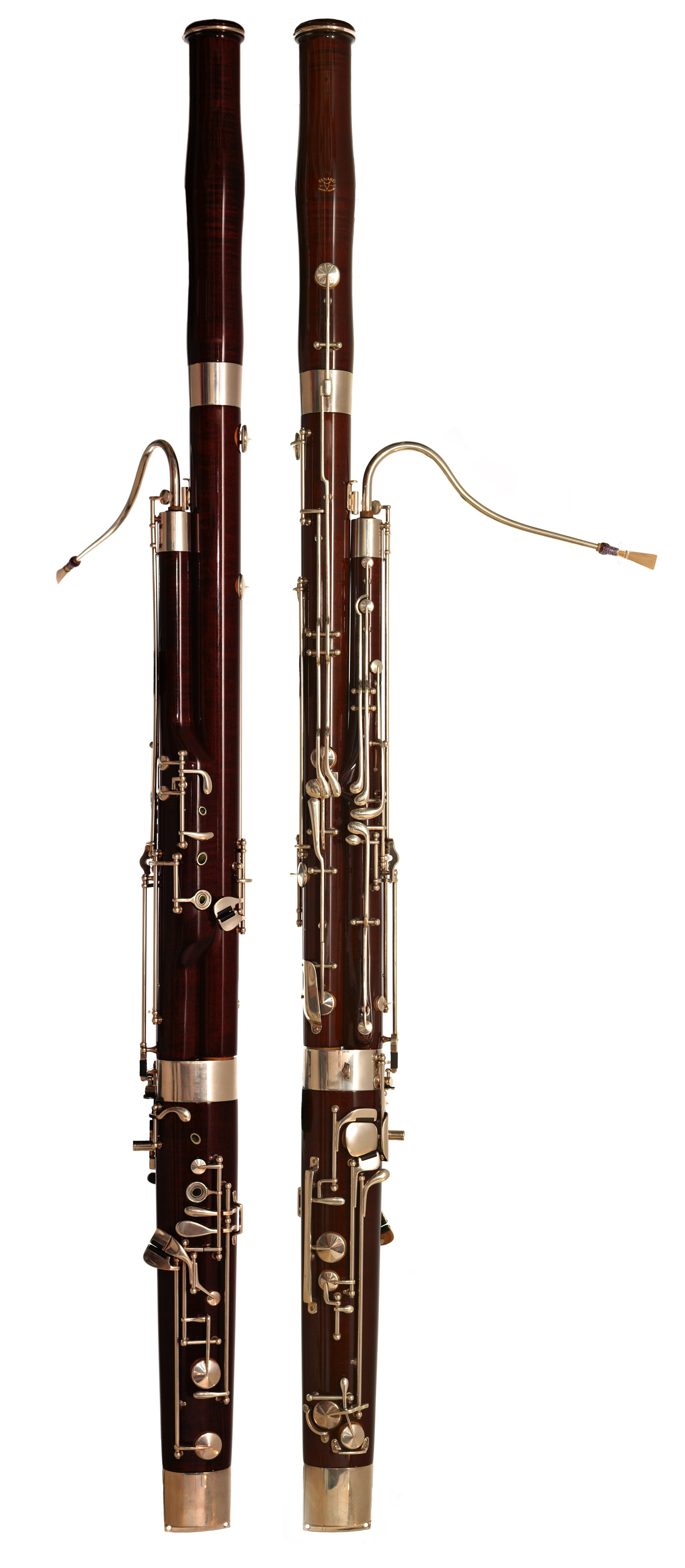
A bassoon

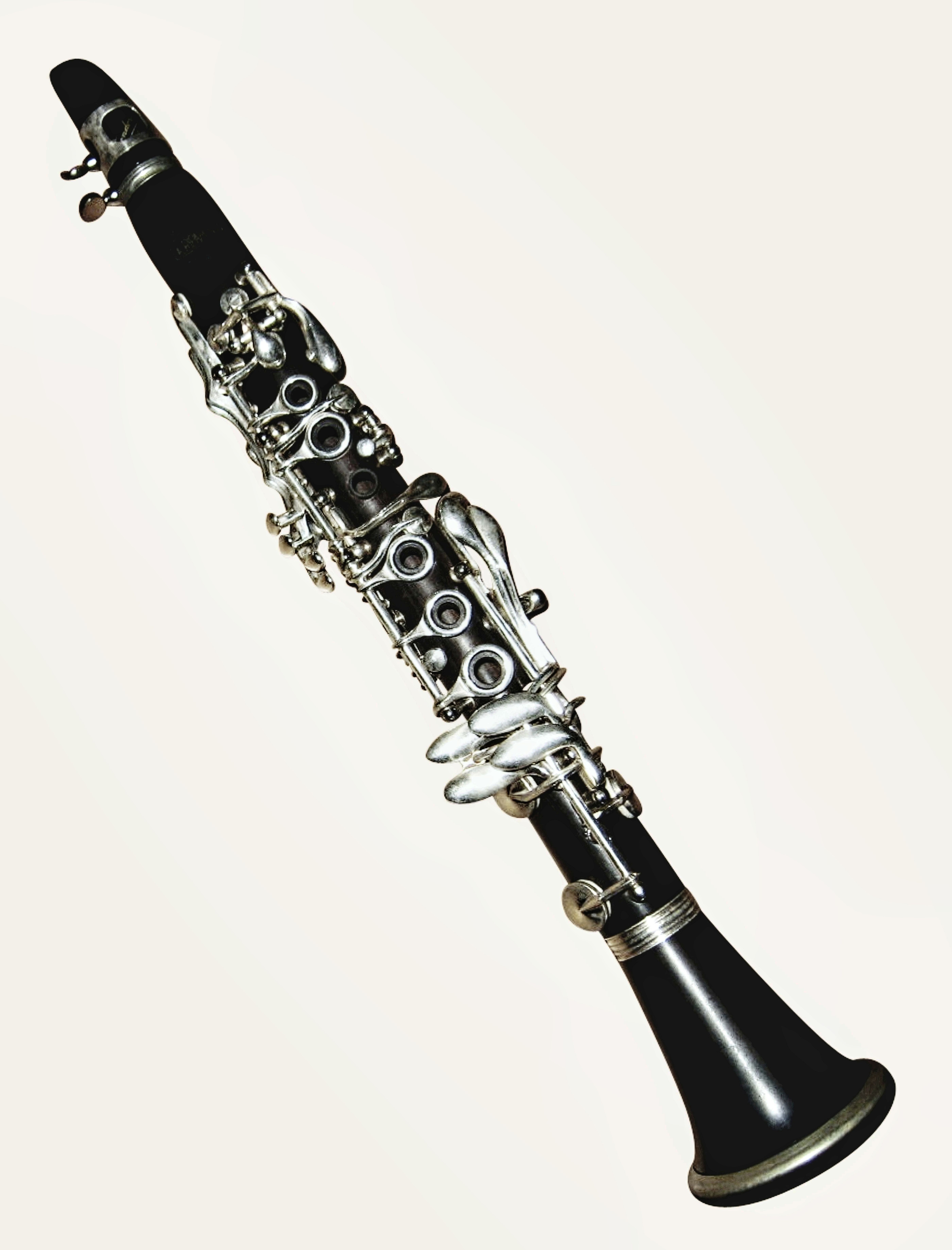
An A-flat clarinet

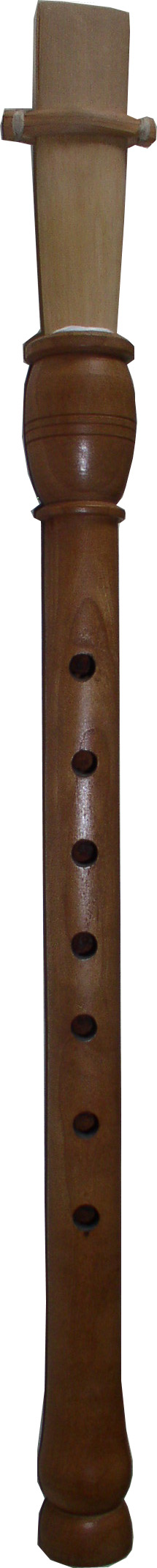
A duduk

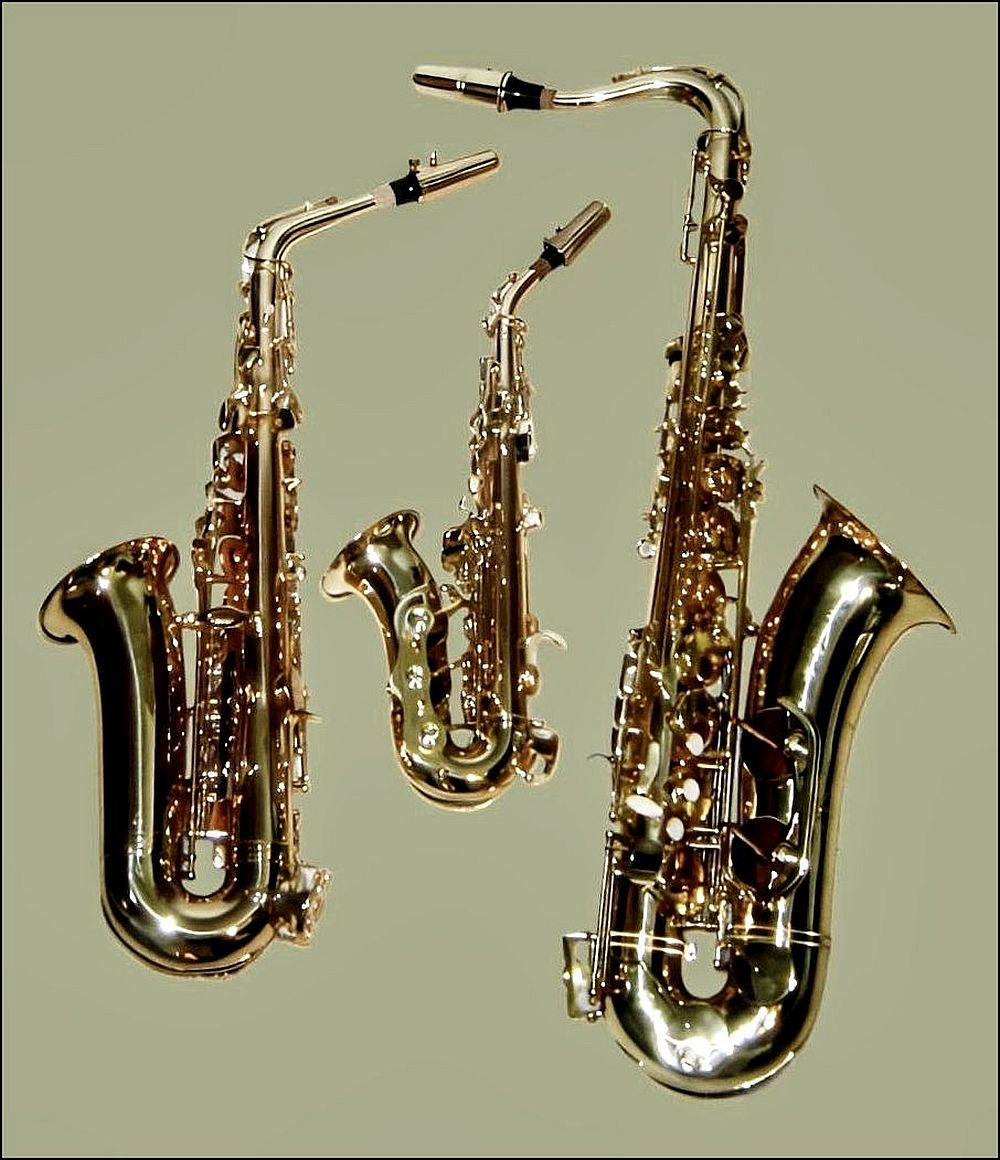
Saxophones – from left to right, an E♭ alto saxophone, a curved B♭ soprano saxophone, and a B♭ tenor saxophone

==== Brass ====
A brass aerophone is a musical instrument that produces sound by sympathetic vibration of air in a tubular resonator in sympathy with the vibration of the player's lips. Brass instruments are also called labrosones, literally meaning "lip-vibrated instruments". There are several factors involved in producing different pitches on a brass instrument. Slides, valves, crooks, or keys are used to change vibratory length of tubing, thus changing the available harmonic series, while the player's embouchure, lip tension and air flow serve to select the specific harmonic produced from the available series. Unlike all other aerophones, brass instruments can be "muted", in other words, their sounds can be somewhat suppressed as one would use a silencer on a firearm. A variety of mutes exist for these instruments, ranging from those made of plastic to others made of metal, and in various shapes.

Brass aerophone examples

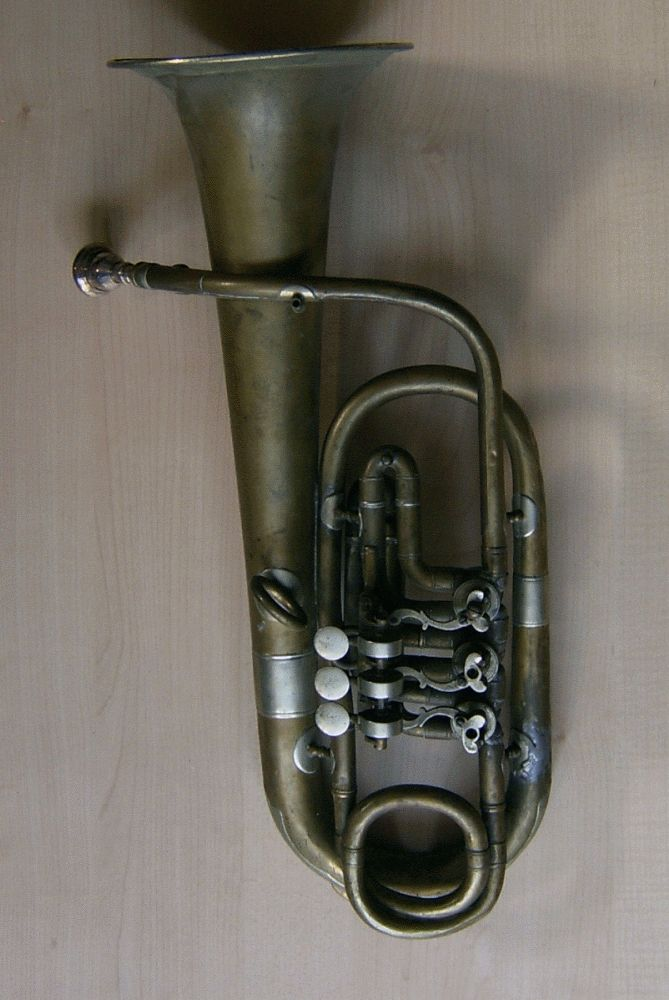
An alto horn is a type of brass instrument and aerophone.

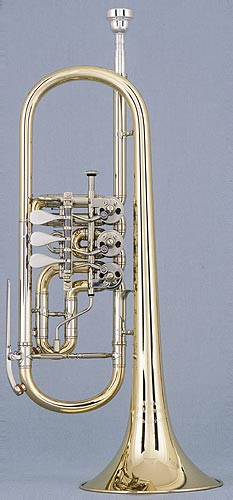
Rotary Valve Trumpet in C

== List of aerophones ==
- Accordina
- Accordion
- Bagpipes
- Bandoneon
- Baritone
- Bassoon
- Clarinet
- Concertina
- Cornet
- Didgeridoo
- English Horn
- Euphonium
- French Horn
- Harmonica
- Harmonium
- Martinshorn
- Melodeon
- Melodica
- Oboe
- Ocarina
- Pan Flute
- Piccolo
- Pipe Organ
- Recorder
- Reed Organ
- Sarrusophone
- Siren disk
- Saxophone
- Sousaphone
- Thongophone
- Transverse Flute
- Trombone
- Trumpet
- Tuba
- Vuvuzela
- Whistle

== See also ==
- List of aerophones by Hornbostel–Sachs number
- Wind instrument
