= T. V. Ramprasadh =

Indian Carnatic music singer

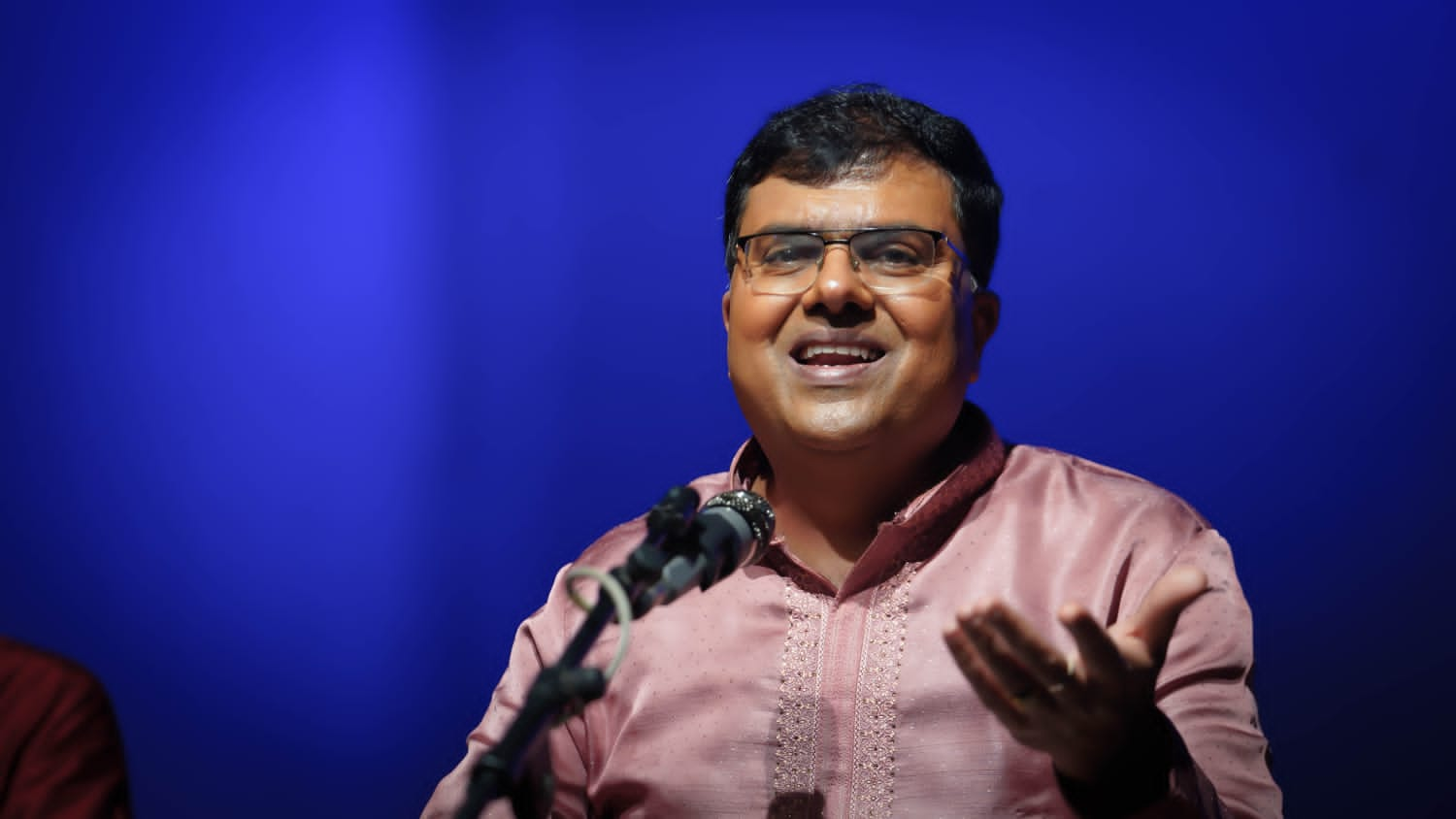
- TVR at Deekshitar Dhruvapada a thematic concert presented for Houston Cultural Centre in 2021

Background information
- Born: 13 May 1969 (age 57); Mumbai, Maharashtra, India
- Genres: Carnatic
- Occupation: Vocalist
- Website: www.tvramprasadh.com

Thokur Vyasa Ramprasadh (born 13 May 1969) is an Indian Carnatic Vocalist, teacher and social entrepreneur.

His training started at home at the age of 3 from his father Shri Vyasa Rao. Around the age of seven more rigorous training from Mahalakshmi Natrajan (Bombay) a senior disciple of Shri T.M.Thiagarajan and later from Sharada Satyanarayana. Ramprasadh received his advanced training from maestros Padma Bhushan P. S. Narayanaswamy, Sangita Kalacharya S Rajam, T. V. Gopalakrishnan and R.R. Keshavamurthy.
