= Thiagarajan Ramani =

Indian musician (born 1962)

Shri Ramani Thiagarajan (born 1962) is an Indian musician.

He is the son of the Carnatic flutist N. Ramani. Ramani Thiagarajan is a musician who performs with a number of instruments, including the flute, the violin, and several Indian classical music instruments such as Kanjira and Clarinet. Sri Thiagarajan has passed with distinction and won the first prize in the Post-Graduate Diploma in Music "Sangeetha Alamkar" (equivalent to an M.A. Music) from the Akhil Bharatiya Gandharva Mahavidyalaya, the premier Indian Institution of Music. Thiagarajan has been awarded Top Rank in All India Radio & Doordharshan Kendra (Government Radio & TV).

Thiagarajan has performed over 4,000 concerts all over the world. He has accompanied the Palghat Mani Iyer, M. S. Gopalakrishnan, Umayalpuram Sivaraman, T. N. Krishnan, Palghat Raghu, V. V. Subramaniam, among others, on the flute.

He has also accompanied many performers on the violin, including his father N. Ramani, D. K. Jayaraman, and U. Srinivas. He has also a large student following in India.

In addition, he has accompanied on the violin and flute for all forms of classical dances of India. He recently taught music at the Singapore Indian Fine Arts Society.

Thiagarajan is also a Kanjira player and has accompanied many concerts on Kanjira.
