= Bansuri =

Indian side-blown flute, generally bamboo

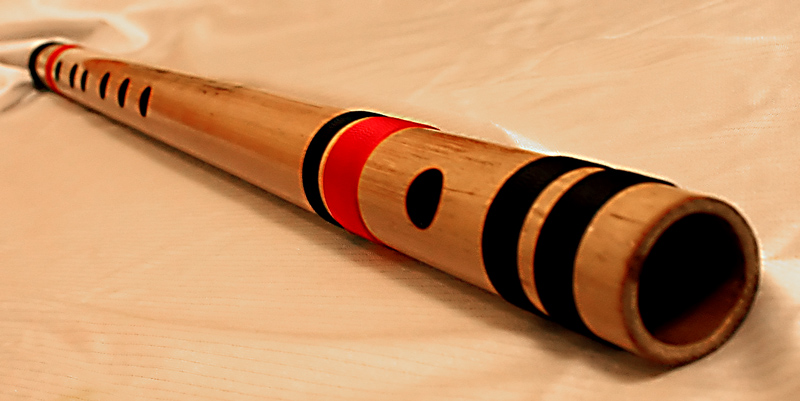
- A 58 cm (23 in) long bansuri bamboo flute for concerts.
- Other names: Baanhi, Baashi, Bansi, Basari, Murali
- Classification: Woodwind instrument

Playing range
- 2 1/2 octaves (six-hole), 3 octaves (seven-hole)

Musicians
- List of Indian flautists

Sound sample
- A Bansuri recording (54 s)

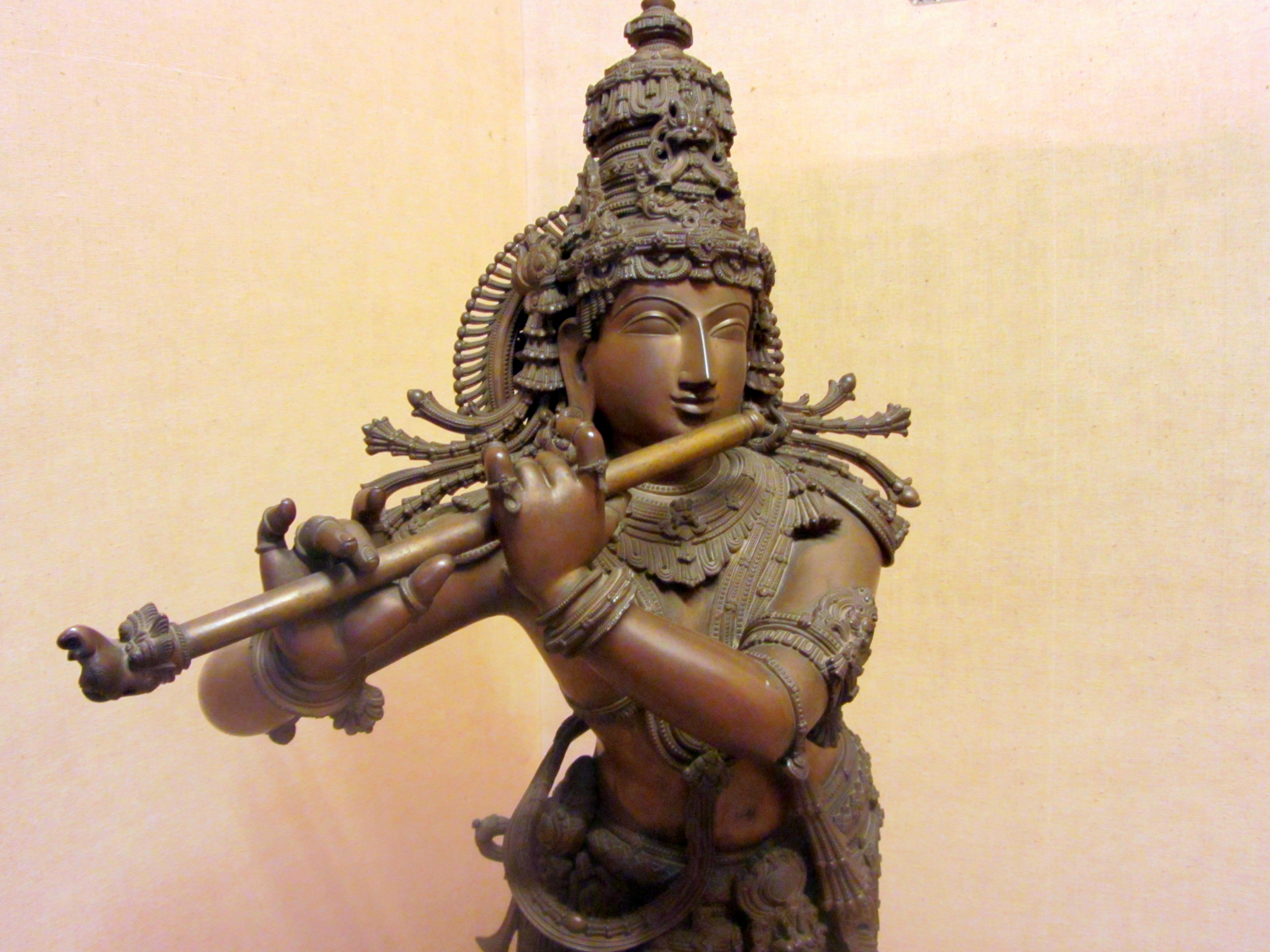
Krishna with a bansuri is sometimes referred to as Venugopal.

A bansuri/flute is an ancient side-blown bamboo flute originating from the Indian Subcontinent. It is an aerophone produced from bamboo and metal-like material, used in many Indian, Sri Lankan and Nepali folk songs. A bansuri is traditionally made from a single hollow shaft of bamboo with seven finger holes. Some modern designs come in ivory, fiberglass and various metals. The six-hole instrument covers two and a half octaves of music. The bansuri is typically between 30 and 75 centimetres (12 and 30 in) in length, and the thickness of a human thumb. The sound of the bansuri depends on size of the bamboo. One end is closed, and few centimeters from the closed end is its blow hole. Longer bansuris feature deeper tones and lower pitches. The traditional design features no mechanical keys, and the musician creates the notes they want by covering and uncovering the various finger holes.

The bansuri-like flute is depicted in ancient Buddhist, Hindu and Jain temple paintings and reliefs, and is common in the iconography of the Hindu god Krishna. It is intimately linked to the love story of Krishna and Radha. The bansuri is revered as Lord Krishna's divine instrument and is often associated with Krishna's Rasa lila dance. These legends sometimes use alternate names for this wind instrument, such as the murali. However, the instrument is also common among other traditions such as Shaivism. The early medieval Indian texts also refer to it as vaṃśi, while in medieval Indonesian Hindu and Buddhist arts, as well as temple carvings in Java and Bali dated to be from pre-10th century period, this transverse flute has been called wangsi or bangsi.

== Etymology and nomenclature ==
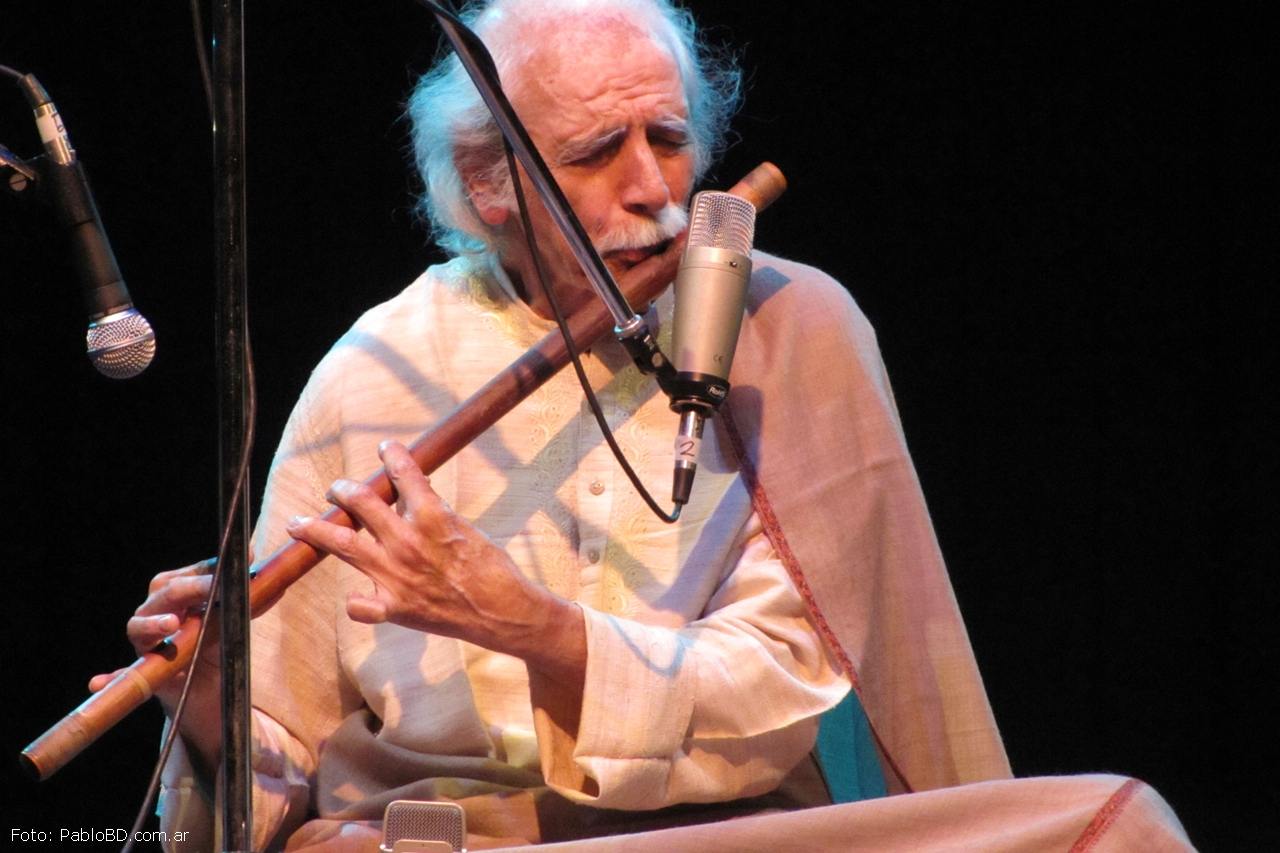
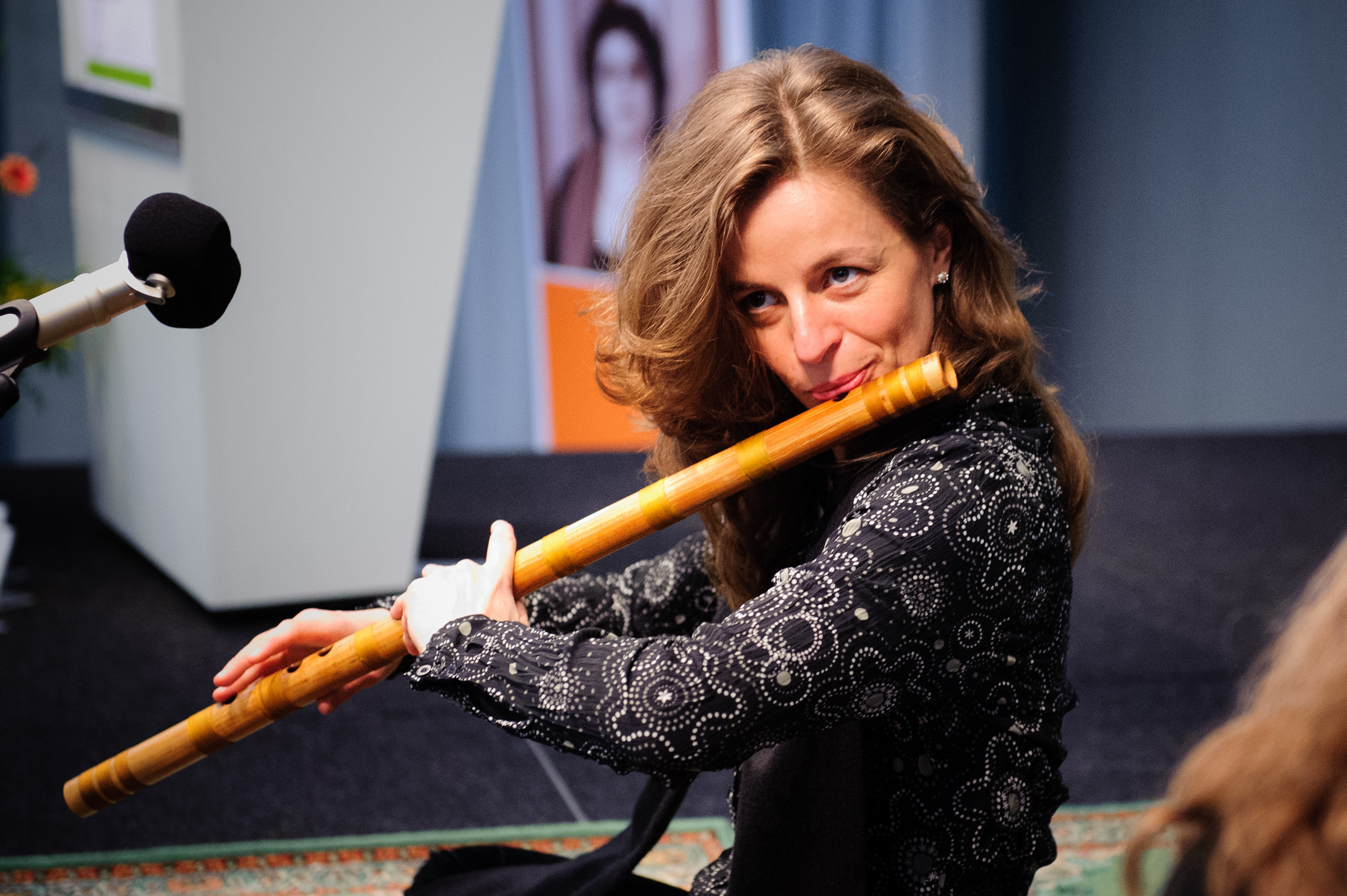
Musicians playing bansuri

The word bansuri originates in the bans (बाँस) [bamboo] + sur (सुर) [melody]. A phonetically similar name for the same instrument, in early medieval texts, is the Sanskrit word vaṃśi which is derived from root vaṃśa (Sanskrit: वंश) meaning bamboo. A flute player in these medieval texts is called vamsika.

Other regional names of bansuri-style, six to eight play holes, bamboo flutes in India include bansi, baashi, eloo, kolakkuzhal, kulal, kulalu, kukhl, lingbufeniam, murali, murli, nadi, nar, odakkuzhal, pawa, pullankuzhal, pillana grovi, pulangoil, vansi, vasdanda, sipung, and venuvu. The instrument is also used in Nepal, under the name Bām̐surī (बाँसुरी). Nepalese also use the word murli (मुरली), but that word can mean not only flute or fife, but also a reed instrument.

Ancient regional innovations, such as those in the Himalayan foothills of India, developed more complex designs, such as the algoza which is a "twin bansuri" in different keys constructed as a single instrument, allowing the musician to play more complex music. In central and south India, a similar innovation is called nagoza or mattiyaan jodi, and Buddhist stupa reliefs in central India, from about the 1st century BCE, depict the single and twinned flute designs.

== History ==
According to Ardal Powell, flute is a simple instrument found in numerous ancient cultures. According to legends, the three birthplaces of flutes are Egypt, Greece, and India. Of these, the transverse flute (side blown) appeared only in ancient India, while the fipple flutes are found in all three. It is likely, states Powell, that the modern Indian bansuri has not changed much since the early medieval era. However, a flute of a somewhat different design is evidenced in ancient China (dizi) which Powell, quoting Curt Sachs' The History of Musical Instruments, suggests may not have originated in China but evolved from a more ancient Central Asian flute design. It is, however, not clear whether there was any connection between the Indian and Chinese varieties.

The early medieval Indian bansuri was, however, influential. Its size, style, bindings, mounts on ends and playing style in medieval Europe artworks has led scholars, such as Liane Ehlich, a flute scholar at the music school in the University of Lucerne, to state that the bansuri (venu) migrated from India into the Byzantine Empire by the 10th century and from there on to medieval Europe where it became popular.

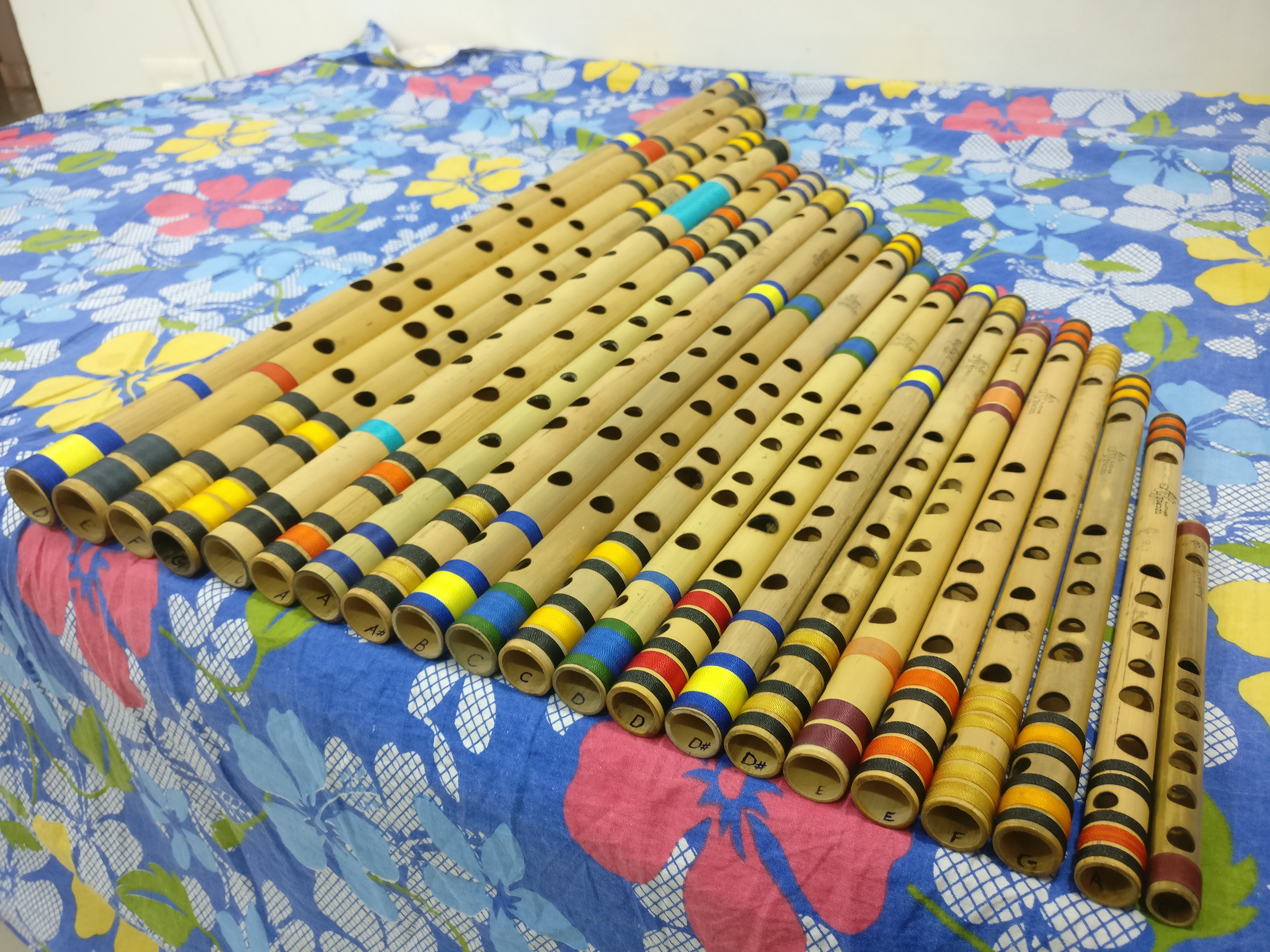
All scales of Bansuris in a set

The flute is discussed as an important musical instrument in the Natya Shastra (~200 BCE to 200 CE), the classic Sanskrit text on music and performance arts. The flute (venu or vamsa) is mentioned in many Hindu texts on music and singing, as complementary to the human voice and Veena (vaani-veena-venu). The flute is however not called bansuri in the ancient, and is referred to by other names such as nadi, tunava in the Rigveda (3000–2500 BCE) and other Vedic texts of Hinduism, or as venu in post-Vedic texts. The flute is also mentioned in various Upanishads and Yoga texts.

According to Bruno Nettl, a music historian and ethnomusicologist, the ancient surviving sculptures and paintings in the temples and archaeological sites of India predominantly show transverse flutes being played horizontally (with a downward tilt). However, beginning in the 15th century, vertical end blowing style are commonly represented. This change in the relevance and style of bansuri is likely, states Nettl, because of the arrival of Islamic rule era on the Indian subcontinent and the West Asian influence on North Indian music.

== Construction ==
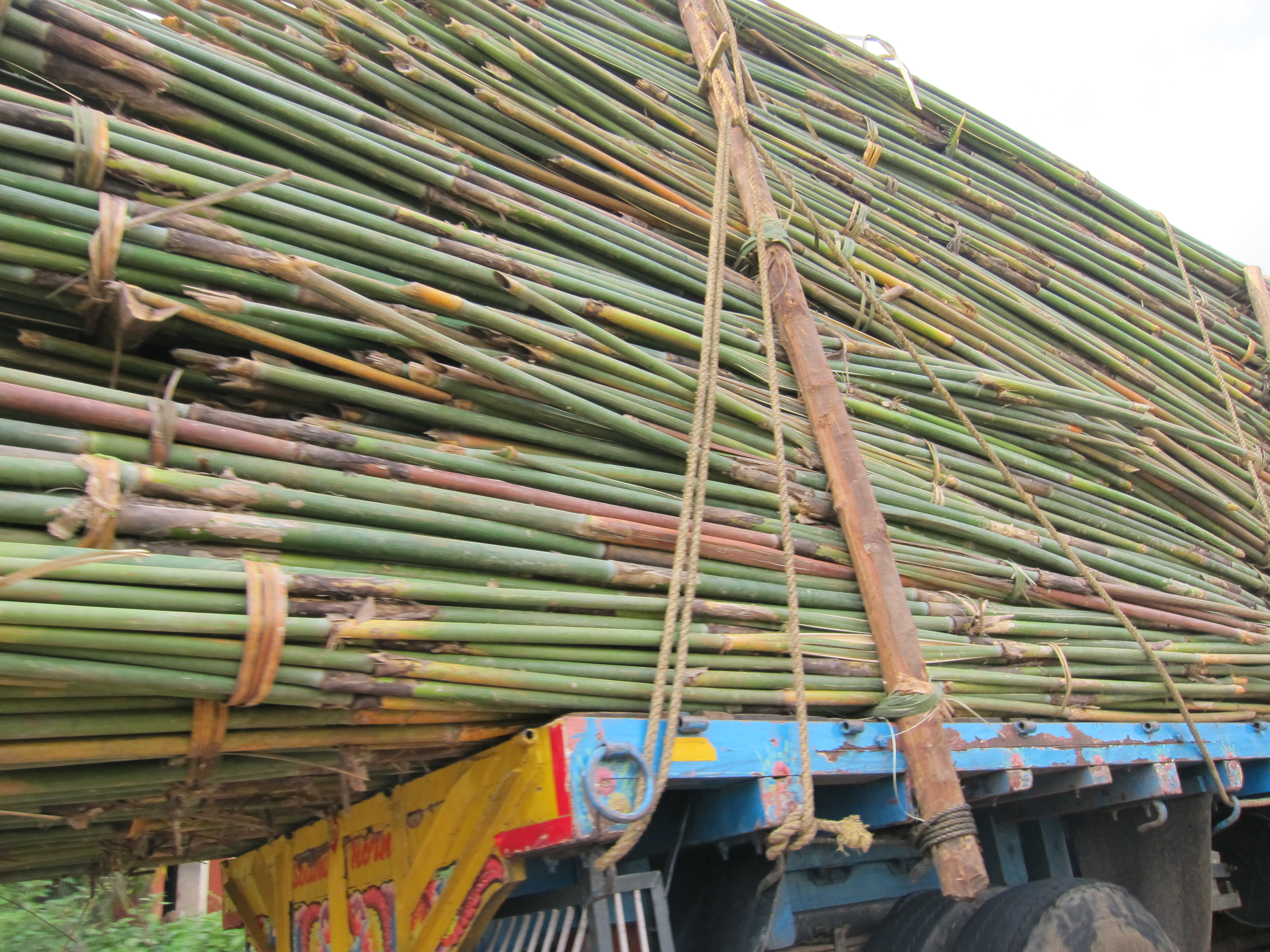
Bansuri is traditionally made from bamboo.

A bansuri is traditionally produced from a special type of bamboo, that naturally grows to long lengths between its nodes (knots). These grow abundantly in Himalayan foothills up to about 11,000 feet with high rainfall. These are particularly found in the northeastern (near Assam, Arunachal Pradesh, Meghalaya, Manipur, Mizoram, Nagaland, Sikkim, Tripura) and Western Ghats (near Kerala) states of India where numerous bamboo species grow with internodal lengths greater than 40 centimetres (16 in).

The harvested bamboo with a desired diameter is cut, dried and treated with natural oils and resins to strengthen it. Once ready, the artisans examine the smoothness and straightness and measure the dried hollow tube. They mark the exact positions for the holes, then use hot metal rod skewers of different diameters to burn in the holes. Drilling and other methods of hole making are avoided as it is believed they damage the fiber orientation and the splits affect the music quality. The burnt-in holes are then finished by sanding, one end plugged, the flute ringed at various positions to stabilize its form and shape over time and the unit tested for its musical performance. The distance of a finger-hole from the mouth-hole, and the diameter of the finger-hole controls the note it plays. Adjustments to the diameters of various holes is made by the artisans to achieve purity of the musical notes produced. The wall thickness of the bansuri determines the tone, range and octave tuning. Once all the holes have reached their performance range, the bansuri is steeped in natural oils, cleaned, dried and decorated or bound with silk or nylon threads.

There are two varieties of bansuri: transverse and fipple. The fipple flute is usually played in folk music and is held at the lips like a tin whistle. Because the transverse variety enables superior control, variations and embellishments, it is preferred in Indian classical music.

The swara (solfège) notes as designed into a bansuri (descending representation)

=== Musical notes ===
Six holes are sufficient to produce seven basic swaras: sa, re, ga, ma, pa, dha, and ni. When all holes are closed, it produces the lowest note of the bansuri (pa). With one hole farthest from the closed end of the bansuri open, the instrument plays the dha. Similarly, ni is produced with two farthest holes open, sa with three farthest open, re with four, ga with five, and ma is produced with all holes open.

Every bansuri by its design and construction has a specific key and tonal center, corresponding to sa (shadja, natural tonic) of the swara scale. This key is achieved by variations in length, inner diameter of the instrument and the relative size and placement of the finger holes. This allows the musician to select a bansuri constructed in the key of the music they want to create and share.

== Playing ==
sound samples
North Indian bansuri, E-key (1 min 39 sec)

sound samples
South Indian venu, E-key (39 sec)

A bansuri is typically held horizontally slanting downwards towards right by the bansuri player. The index, middle and ring fingers of the right hand cover the outer fingerholes, while the same fingers of the left hand cover the rest. The bansuri is supported by the thumb and little finger, while the airhole is positioned near the lips and air blown over it at various speeds to reach the desired octave. For the seven-hole bansuri, the little finger (pinky) of the right hand is usually employed.

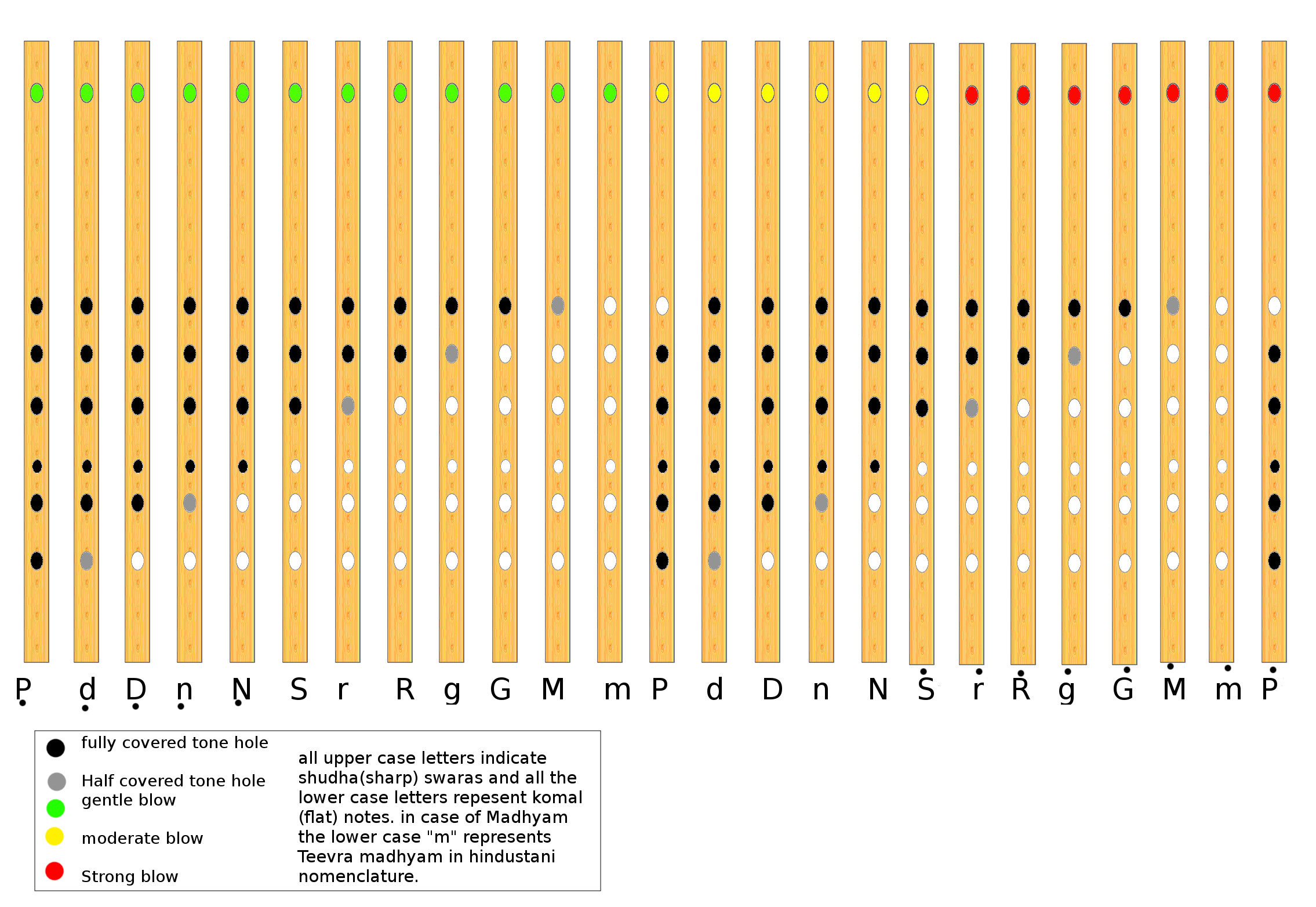
Fingering chart for a bansuri

As with other air-reed wind instruments, the sound of a bansuri is generated from resonance of the air column inside it. The length of this column is varied by closing or leaving open, a varying number of holes. Half-holing is employed to play flat or minor notes. The 'sa' (on the Indian sargam scale, or equivalent 'do' on the octave) note is obtained by covering the first three holes from the blowing-hole. Octaves are varied by manipulating one's embouchure and controlling the blowing strength. Either finger tips or finger pads are used by bansuri players to partially or fully cover the tap holes.

In order to play the diatonic scale on a bansuri, one needs to find where the notes lie. For example, in a bansuri where Sa or the tonic is always played by closing the first three holes, is equivalent to C, one can play sheet music by creating a finger notation that corresponds to different notes. A flutist is able to perform complex facets of Raga music such as microtonal inflections, ornamentation, and glissando by varying the breath, performing fast and dexterous fingering, and closing/opening the holes with slow, sweeping gestures.

== See also ==
- Hindustani classical music
- Venu
- Bamboo musical instruments
- Pannalal Ghosh
- Hariprasad Chaurasia
- Rakesh Chaurasia
