= B. N. Suresh (musician) =

Indian flautist

B. N. Suresh (1946–1990) was an Indian flautist of carnatic music.

== Early life ==
B.N. Suresh was born on 7 January 1946 in Bangalore, Karnataka. He was a child prodigy and started learning flute at a very young age from T.R. Mahalingam (Flute Mali).

== Career ==
B. N. Suresh had his first concert in 1956 in Bangalore. He was a staff artist at All India Radio and played often in national programmes. In the late 1970s and 80s he gave over 40 concerts in the US and Canada. In 1982 he had a fall in his house. He collaborated with many of the leading musicians of his time such as Ravi Shankar, M.S. Subbulakshmi, Lalgudi Jayaraman and Umayalpuram Santhanam. His last concerts took place in Mysore on 29 June 1990.

== Death ==
He died on 7 October 1990 after a brief illness at the age of 44.
