= Palladam Sanjiva Rao =

Indian flautist and carnatic musician

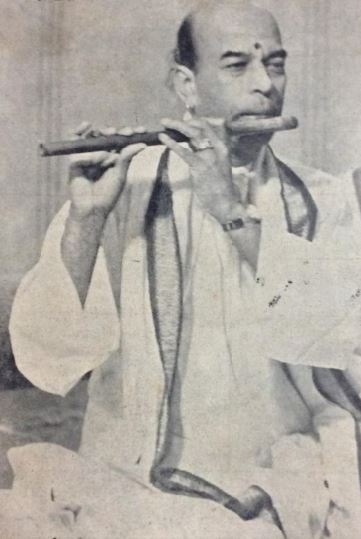
- Sanjiva Rao in 1942
- Born: 18 October 1882; Palladam, Madras Presidency, India
- Died: July 11, 1962 (aged 79)
- Known for: Flautist

Palladam Sanjiva Rao (October 18, 1882 – July 11, 1962) was an Indian flautist and carnatic musician from the state of Tamil Nadu.

== Personal life ==
Sanjiva Rao was born in 1882 in the town of Palladam near Coimbatore in a Thanjavur Marathi family. Sanjiva Rao learnt music under Shatkala Narasayya and Sirkazhi Narayanaswamy and learnt flute from Sarabha Sastri for seven years.

He was awarded the prestigious title of "Sangita Kalanidhi" for his services to Classical Indian Music by the Music Academy Chennai. His playing is noted for its unique style and the tonality. He also received the Sangeetha Kalasikhamani award bestowed on him by The Indian Fine Arts Society, Chennai in 1943.
