= Sikkil Mala Chandrasekar =

Kalaimamani Mala Chandrasekhar
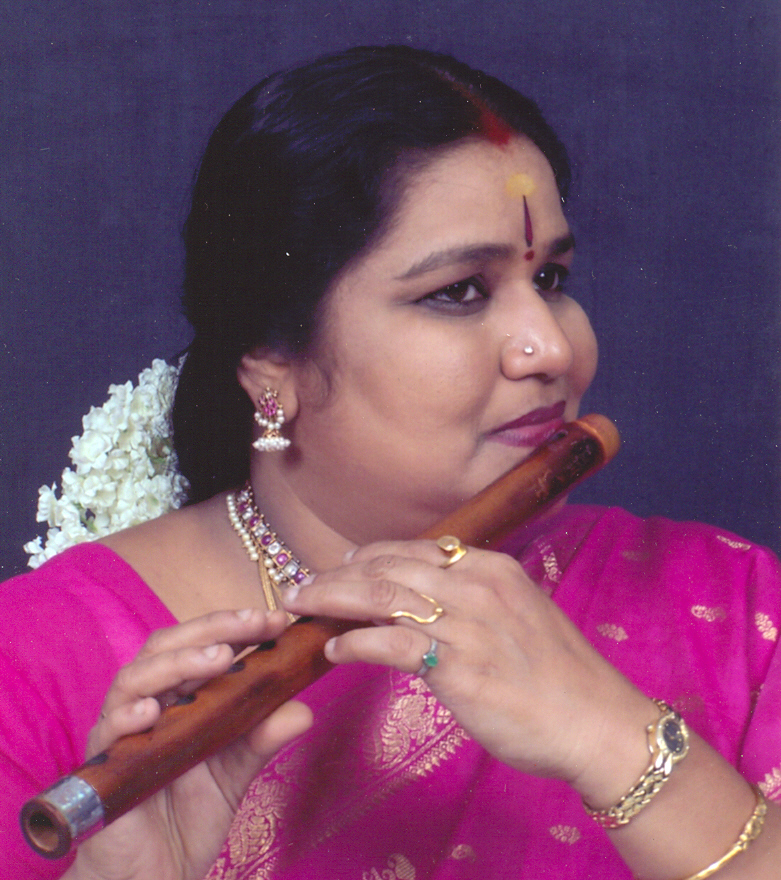

Background information
- Born: 23 August 1963 (age 63)
- Genre: Carnatic classical music
- Occupation: flute artiste
- Instrument: Flute
- Years active: since 1980
- Website: flutemala.in

Sikkil Mala Chandrasekhar (b 1963) is a noted South Indian carnatic flautist. Mala Chandrasekhar was born to a musical family.

Mala Chandrasekhar started learning from Sikkil Sisters, her aunt Kunjumani and her mother Neela. In playing style, Mala combines the strongest aspects of both Aunt Kunjumani's clear classic lines with Mother Neela's flair and expressiveness.

Mala imbibed through her mother the flute artistry of their paternal uncle, Azhiyur Narayanaswamy Iyer, and the rigorous rhythmic training given by their mrudungam-playing father, Azhiyur Natesa Iyer. Other major influences on Mala's playing are the expertise and repertoire of noted vocalist and teacher Radha Viswanathan, and of Radha's stepmother and guru M.S. Subbulakshmi. Mala's husband Chandrashekhar is Radha's son.

== Early life and background ==
Born in a reputed musical family on 23 August 1963, Mala started learning flute at the age of five from her gurus Padmasree Sangeetha Kalanidhi Smt Sikkil Neela (mother) and Smt. Sikkil Kunjumani (Aunt).

Lessons progressed slowly until her 15th year, when her parents decided to do go for her arangetram. This was done at "Sakthivel llam", Mylapore (spiritual guru's house Sri Mani Swamigal) in an unconventional manner with Sri. S.D. Sridhar on the violin and Sri Srimushnam V. Raja Rao on the Mridangam. Later Mala passed through auditions in all India radio for youth programme where she performed at regular intervals.

It was at this time that Mala happened to be auditioned and selected by Doordarshan Kendra in 1980 to perform in "Ilam thendral" programme (a 15-minute slot)-live. She had played Thyagaraja's tholijenma-Bilahari, Ramakathasudha-Madhyamavathi and a song in Behag. This programme brought Mala much appreciation from many great musicians such as late Smt. Brindamma and late Sri Nagarajan- reputed Khanjira artiste. It was at this point that late Sri Yagnaraman of Krishna Gana Sabha (who happened to watch the TV programme) gave her the first opportunity to perform Mala's debut concert at the sabha in August 1980. From then on, her musical responsibilities gradually increased.

At this juncture, Mala got the first prize from all India radio for "wind instrument category" blessed by late Smt. M.S. Subbulakshmi (MSS) in 1982 and was there upon graded to give regular concerts in radio. At the same time, her inter collegiate music competitions (represented Stella Maris college, where she studied) were also instrumental in building up her confidence to emerge as a successful musician.

When Mala was in her final year, that she had the opportunity to participate in the "Violin Venu Veena" trio ensemble with Smt. Lalgudi Vijayalakshmi on the violin and her friend Jayanthi on the veena. Soon this became successful and Lalgudi mama suggested such an ensemble for concerts. They both performed our debut concert at Krishna Gana Sabha along with Veenai Jayanthi on 1.1.1986. Mala's association with Lalgudi mama's family taught her many values in life such as discipline, hard work and dedication to the cause of music.

Mala married the legendary MSS's grandson on 20 June of that year. This indeed provided an additional mileage to attain perfection in her musical career. Besides the VVV ensemble, she also had the opportunity to perform with Sikkil Sisters as flute trio which helped to improve her repertoire in the concert platform.

== Education ==
She studied in Rosary Matriculation School, Chennai. No one knew that Mala would play flute until she stepped into 7th standard. Mala was very shy and refused to participate in school cultural activities. Later, one of her teachers took the initiative and made her play a solo piece. This became an opening for Mala to participate in inter school music competitions. Mala's most interesting subject in school was biology and this encouraged her to take up botany as major in Stella Maris College. She just loved that subject and used to be one among the class toppers. Soon her principal and head of the department, on knowing her potential, would allow her to participate in all cultural activities of the college. As a result, her interest in music blossomed and winning prizes for my college gave her great confidence to pursue musical career.

During the same period, she started giving concerts in sabhas both in Chennai and outside. After her graduation, she joined Presidency College for post graduation in botany. Thank god for showing this divine path of music for Mala. Her other interests included painting, embroidery and a bit of creative hand work.

== Awards ==
- 2006 : "Shanmukha Sangeetha Shiromani" Bombay Shanmukhananda Sangeetha Sabha.
- 2003 : October, received the title of "Venugaana Sironmani" at DUBAI.
- 2002 : November * 200* 2 NADAKKANAL from Nadakkanal (Regd), Chennai.
- 2001 : Received the Music Academy's MD Ramanathan Award for a senior flautist.
- 2000 : Received the Kartik Fine Arts' Isai Peroli title from Smt Vyjayanthimala Bali.
- 2000 : Received the Kalki Centenary Award, instituted by the Kalki Memorial Trust.
- 1996 : Received Bharat Kalachar's Yuva Kala Bharati.
- 1995 : Received title of Kalaimamani Award by the Government of Tamil Nadu, which is the highest state honour in the field of Arts.
- 1993 : Received the Flute Mali award of the Music Academy, Madras.
- 1990 : Received the Nyapati Ranganayakammal Award for Junior Flautists of the Music Academy, Madras.
- 1990 : Received the Flautist award and Main Artist award of the Youth Association for Classical Music, Madras.

== See also ==
- Carnatic Music
- Sikkil Sisters - Kunjumani & Neela
- M. S. Subbulakshmi
