= Ardal Powell =

Ardal Powell (born 1958) is a musician and publisher. He makes and plays historical flutes and publishes books on music. He specializes in baroque and classical flute as well as the impact that construction, playing technique, performance and repertoire has on society.

== Life and career ==
Powell received his MA in English in 1989 and PhD degree in Music in 2004 from Magdalene College, Cambridge University. He studied Baroque flute at the Royal Conservatory of The Hague. In 1984 he co-founded Folkers & Powell, Makers of Historical Flutes. The company ceased operations in 2009. In 2010 he founded Music Word Media Group, to publish books about music.

== Books ==
He has written on flute history and flute playing, and has received several awards. He won the Bessaraboff Prize in 2005 for The Flute, and an award from the Fellowship for College Teachers and Independent Scholars from the National Endowment for the Humanities in 1993.

== See also ==
- Johann George Tromlitz
- Theobald Boehm

== Sources ==
- Lasocki, David. Folkers & Powell: A Couple of Flute Makers, Early Music America 2.2 (Summer 1996), pp. 10–16
- International Who’s Who in Music, 13th edition (1992–3), p. 906
- 2005 Bessaraboff Prize Honors Ardal Powell for The Flute, Newsletter of the American Musical Instrument Society, 34.2 (Summer 2005), pp. 4–5
