= Sikkil Sisters =

Indian musicians

Sikkil Kunjumani
- Born: 10 June 1927
- Died: 13 November 2010 (aged 83)
- Occupation: Carnatic flutist

Sikkil Neela
- Born: 9 September 1938
- Died: 17 September 2023 (aged 85)
- Occupation: Carnatic flutist
- Children: Sikkil Mala Chandrasekar

Sikkil Kunjumani (10 June 1927 – 13 November 2010) and Sikkil Neela (9 September 1938 – 17 September 2023) were sisters who played the carnatic flute, called Venu flute. Together they are more famously known as the Sikkil Sisters. Their father Azhiyur Natesa Iyer was a mridangist. Kunjumani started learning music from her father initially and then learnt flute from her maternal uncle Azhiyur Narayanaswami Iyer. Neela learnt flute from her sister Kunjamani. Kunjamani, began giving concerts from the age of nine and Neela from the age of seven. Sikkil Sisters have been giving concerts together since 1962. They are top artistes of the All India Radio and they have been giving hundreds of performances at all the sabhas, television and elsewhere, both within India and abroad. The sisters blend the tone and play on their flutes and the merger is total and the effect remarkable. They are known for the chaste, orthodox style in rendering raga, kriti and swara.

Sikkil Kunjumani died in Chennai on 13 November 2010, at the age of 83. Sikkil Neela died on 17 September 2023, at the age of 85. Sikkil Mala Chandrasekar, the daughter of Neela, is following her mother's footprints as flautist.

== Honours and awards ==
- Kalaimamani by the Tamil Nadu Sangeetha Nataka Sangam - 1973
- Sangeet Natak Akademi Award - 1989
- Sangeetha Kalasikhamani by The Indian Fine Arts Society, Chennai - 1997
- Sangeetha Kalanidhi - 2002
- Padmashree - 2004

== See also ==
- Carnatic Music
- Sikkil Mala Chandrasekar
