= Nagapattinam =

City in Tamil Nadu

Nagapattinam Chola Nadu
- City
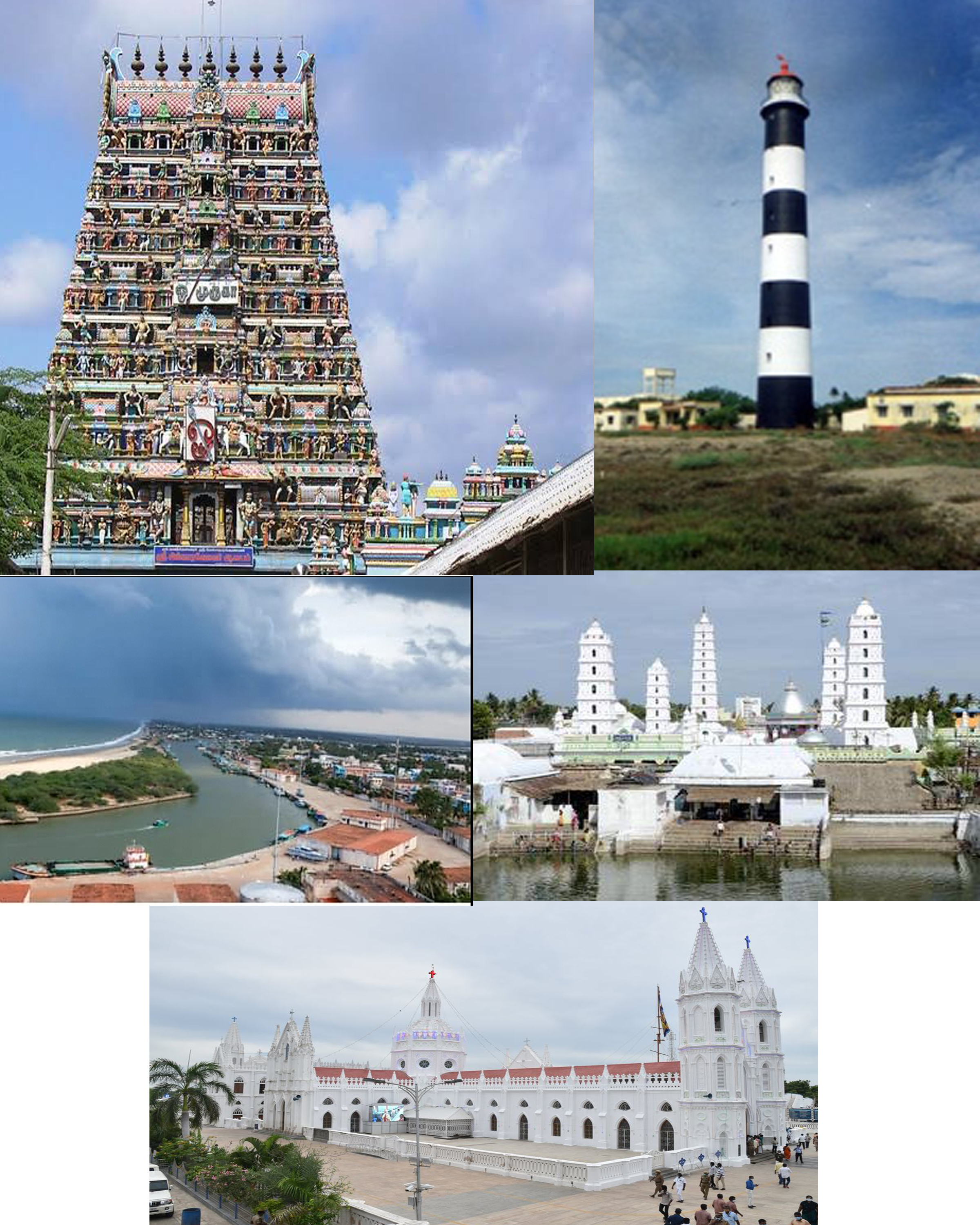
- Sikkal Singaravelan Temple, Nagapattinam Lighthouse, Beach view, Nagore Dargah, Velankanni Basilica of Our Lady of Good Health
- Nickname: City of Coromandel
- Nagapattinam, Tamil Nadu
- Coordinates: 10.767200°N 79.844900°E
- Country: India
- State: Tamil Nadu
- District: Nagapattinam
- Region: Cauvery Delta
- Established: 1866

Government
  - Type: Selection Grade Municipality
  - Body: Nagapattinam Municipality Chairman R.Marimuthu

Area
  - Total: 17.92 km^{2} (6.92 sq mi)
- Elevation: 29 m (95 ft)

Population (2011)
  - Total: 102,905
  - Rank: 32
  - Density: 5,800/km^{2} (15,000/sq mi)

Languages
  - Official: Tamil
- Time zone: UTC+5:30 (IST)
- PIN: 611xxx
- Telephone code: 04365
- Vehicle registration: TN 51

Nagapattinam (nākappaṭṭinam, previously spelt Nagapatnam or Negapatam) is a city in the Indian state of Tamil Nadu and the administrative headquarters of Nagapattinam district. The town came to prominence during the period of Medieval Cholas (9th–12th century CE) and served as their important port for commerce and east-bound naval expeditions.

It was settled by the Portuguese and, later, the Dutch under whom it served as the capital of Dutch Coromandel from 1660 to 1781. In November 1781, the town was conquered by the British East India Company. It served as the capital of Tanjore district from 1799 to 1845 under Madras Presidency of the British. It continued to be a part of Thanjavur district in Independent India. In 1991, it was made the headquarters of the newly created Nagapattinam District. Nagapattinam is administered by a Special grade municipality covering an area of 17.92 km^{2} (6.92 sq mi) and had a population of 102,905 as of 2011.

A majority of the people of Nagapattinam are employed in sea-borne trading, fishing, agriculture and tourism. Kayarohanaswami Temple and Soundararajaperumal Temple, Nagapattinam are the major Hindu pilgrimage sites. Nagapattinam is the base for tourism for Sikkal, Velankanni, Poompuhar, Kodiakkarai, Vedaranyam, and Tharangambadi. Roadways is the major mode of transport to Nagapattinam, while the city also has rail and sea transport.

== Etymology ==
Nagapattinam is derived from Nagar referring to people from Sri Lanka who settled here and pattinam referring to town. It was also called CholakulaVallipattinam during the period of Kulottunga I, named after one of his queens, when it was one of the important ports. Ptolemy refers to Nagapattinam as Nikam and mentions it as one of the most important trade centres of the ancient Tamil country. Nagapattinam was referred by early writers and the Portuguese as "the city of Coromandel". Appar and Sambandar, the 7th-century saint poets refer to the city as Nagai in their verses in Tevaram. The town was originally called "Nagai" and the word Pattinam was attached during the Chola era when it emerged as an important port.

== History ==
There are urn burials in and around the city from the Sangam period indicating some level of human habitation. Except the mention in Ptolemy as 'Νίγαμα Μετρόπολις,' there are no direct references to Nagapattinam during the 3rd century BCE to 3rd century CE. The neighbouring port, Kaveripoompattinam (modern-day Poompuhar), was the capital of the Chola kingdom of the Sangam Age, referred to widely in Tamil scriptures such as Paṭṭiṉappālai.

The Soundarajaperumal temple finds mention in the Brahmanda Purana in the Uttarakanda Jnana Yoga section. It is also glorified in the Nalayira Divya Prabandham, the 5th to 9th century CE Vaishnava canon, written by the Alvars. It is considered one of the important temples visited by Tirumangai Alvar. The temple is classified as a Divya Desam, one of the 108 Vishnu temples that are mentioned in the book.

The early works of Tevaram by the 7th-century poets Appar and Sambandar mention the town had fortified walls, busy road building and a busy port. The inscriptions from the Kayarohanswami temple indicate the construction was initiated during the reign of the Pallava king, Narasimha Pallava II (691–729 CE).

A Buddhist pagoda was built under Chinese influence by the Pallava king and the town was frequented by Buddhist travelers. The Chudamani Vihara in Nagapattinam constructed by the Srivijayan king Sri Mara Vijayattungavarman of the Sailendra dynasty with the help of Rajaraja Chola I was an important Buddhist structure in those times.

In the 11th century CE, Chudamani Vihara, a Buddhist monastery, was built by the Sailendra king of Srivijaya Sri Mara Vijayattungavarman with the patronage of Raja Raja Chola. It was named Chudamani or Chulamani Vihara after King Sri Mara's father As per the small Leyden grant this Vihara was called Rajaraja-perumpalli during the time of Kulottunga I. Nagapattinam was a prominent port of Cholas for trade and a conquering gateway to the east.

In the early 16th century the Portuguese made commercial contacts with the town and established a commercial centre in 1554 CE. The Portuguese also conducted missionary enterprise here. In 1658, the Dutch made an agreement with King Vijaya Nayakkar of Thanjavur on 5 January 1662, by which ten villages were transferred from the Portuguese to the Dutch – Nagapattinam Port, Puthur, Muttam, Poruvalancheri, Anthanappettai, Karureppankadu, AzhingiMangalam, Sangamangalam, Thiruthinamangalam, Manjakollai, Nariyankudi. Ten Christian churches and a hospital were built by the Dutch. They released Pagoda coins with the name Nagapattinam engraved in Tamil. As per agreement between the first Maratha King, Ekoji Raje of Thanjavur, and the Dutch, Naagapattinam and surrounding villages were handed over to the Dutch on 30 December 1676. In 1690, the capital of Dutch Coromandel changed from Pulicat to Nagapattinam.

This town fell into the hands of the British in 1781 after the two naval battles between British and French fleets were fought off the coast of Negapatam, as it was then known: the first in 1758 as part of the Seven Years' War and the second in 1782 as part of the Fourth Anglo-Dutch War. The town was taken by the British from the Dutch in 1781 (who had been formally brought into the war in 1780). When the Dutch and British reached a peace agreement in 1784, Nagapattinam was formally ceded to the British. 277 villages, with Nagore as the headquarters, were handed over to the East India Company.

From 1799 to 1845 CE, Nagapttinam was the headquarters of Tanjore district. Nagapattinam and Nagore were incorporated as a single municipality in 1866 CE. The town remained one of the chief ports to the Madras Presidency. The port suffered decline after the inclusion of Tranquebar and Tuticorin ports. After India's independence, Sirkazhi continued to be a part of Thanjavur district until 1991, and later became part of the newly created Nagapattinam district. Nagapattinam was severely affected by the tsunami which followed the 2004 Indian Ocean earthquake.

== Geography ==
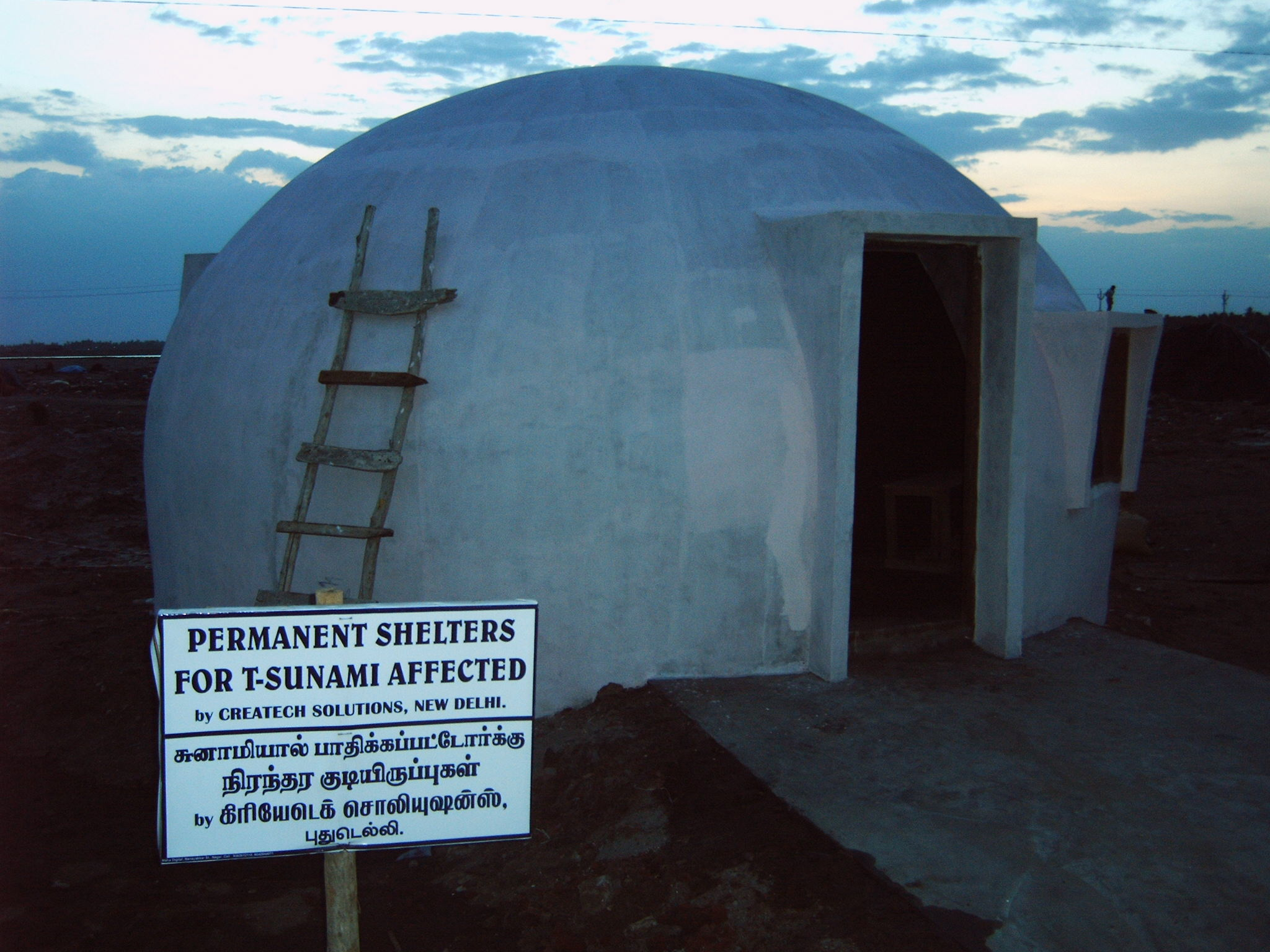
Permanent shelter for tsunami-affected families in Nagapattinam

Nagapattinam lies at 10.77°N 79.83°E. The town is bounded by Bay of Bengal in the east, Uppanar river in the south, Thiruvarur district in the west, Thanjavur district in the north west and Karaikkal & Puducherry in the north. The town lies in the sea level. The municipality covers an area of 14.92 km^{2} (5.76 sq mi) Nagapattinam is situated at a distance of 300 km (190 mi) from Chennai, 14 km (8.7 mi) from Karaikal, 40 km (25 mi) from Mayiladuthurai, 40 km (25 mi) from Kumbakonam, 80 km (50 mi) from Thanjavur and 25 km (16 mi) from Thiruvarur.

Nagapattinam lies on a plain terrain of alluvial soil consisting of sand, silt and clay. The Vettar River and the tributaries of river Cauvery are the major water bodies. Paddy is the major crop in the region, followed by groundnut, pulses, sugarcane, cotton and sesame. The town is one of the cyclone-prone zones and was devastated during the 2004 tsunami. A very fine layer of high saline soil was deposited in the paddy fields.

=== Climate ===
Nagapattinam has a tropical savanna climate (Köppen As) with a wet season from August to December due to the northeast monsoon. The city receives an annual rainfall of 1,350 millimetres or 53 inches. Proximity to the sea results in a high humidity throughout the year, which reaches 70% from August to May.

Climate data for Nagapattinam (1991–2020, extremes 1901–2020)
Month	Jan	Feb	Mar	Apr	May	Jun	Jul	Aug	Sep	Oct	Nov	Dec	Year
Record high °C (°F)	32.4 (90.3)	35.6 (96.1)	40.0 (104.0)	41.7 (107.1)	42.8 (109.0)	41.7 (107.1)	41.7 (107.1)	40.6 (105.1)	39.8 (103.6)	37.6 (99.7)	35.0 (95.0)	33.9 (93.0)	42.8 (109.0)
Mean daily maximum °C (°F)	29.4 (84.9)	30.4 (86.7)	32.0 (89.6)	34.0 (93.2)	36.3 (97.3)	36.8 (98.2)	36.3 (97.3)	35.5 (95.9)	34.5 (94.1)	32.3 (90.1)	30.0 (86.0)	29.2 (84.6)	33.1 (91.6)
Mean daily minimum °C (°F)	22.3 (72.1)	22.9 (73.2)	24.2 (75.6)	26.5 (79.7)	27.3 (81.1)	26.9 (80.4)	26.4 (79.5)	25.9 (78.6)	25.7 (78.3)	25.1 (77.2)	24.1 (75.4)	23.0 (73.4)	25.0 (77.0)
Record low °C (°F)	16.1 (61.0)	15.6 (60.1)	16.7 (62.1)	20.0 (68.0)	20.6 (69.1)	20.6 (69.1)	21.7 (71.1)	20.0 (68.0)	20.6 (69.1)	20.6 (69.1)	16.7 (62.1)	16.7 (62.1)	15.6 (60.1)
Average rainfall mm (inches)	37.2 (1.46)	13.0 (0.51)	12.4 (0.49)	32.0 (1.26)	47.9 (1.89)	38.8 (1.53)	42.9 (1.69)	81.1 (3.19)	84.5 (3.33)	250.9 (9.88)	446.2 (17.57)	262.1 (10.32)	1,349.1 (53.11)
Average rainy days	2.1	0.8	0.6	1.3	2.8	2.0	2.8	4.7	4.4	9.5	13.4	8.3	52.7
Average relative humidity (%) (at 17:30 IST)	72	69	69	70	69	64	63	66	71	76	81	78	71
Source: India Meteorological Department

=== 2004 tsunami ===
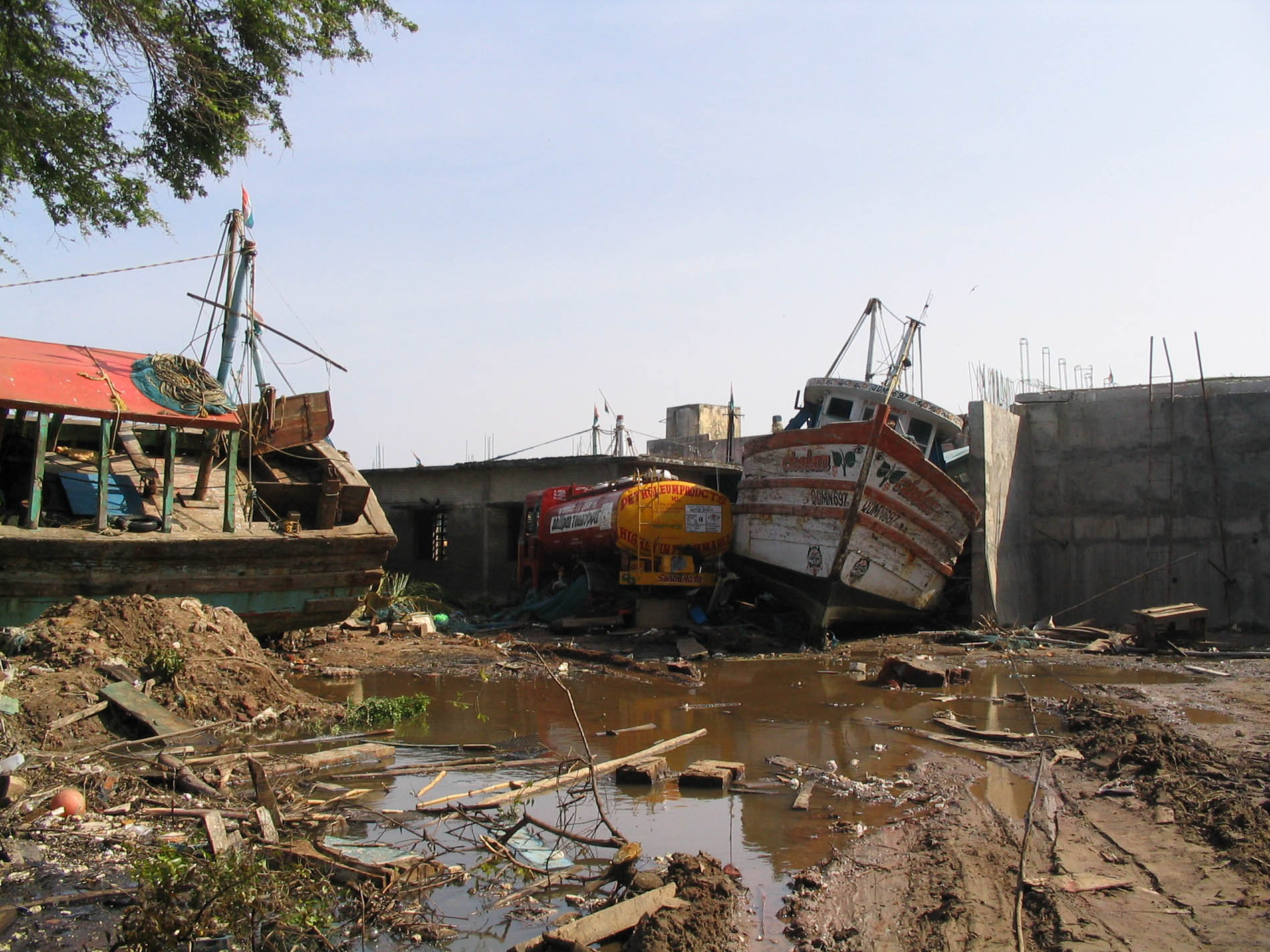
Tsunami caused damages in Nagapattinam

The 2004 Indian Ocean earthquake was an undersea megathrust earthquake that on 26 December 2004, with an epicentre off the west coast of Sumatra, Indonesia, which triggered a series of devastating tsunamis along the coasts of most landmasses bordering the Indian Ocean. Nagapattinam district was the most affected part in Tamil Nadu, accounting for 6,064 of the 8,009 casualties in the state. A large number of the casualties were from the fishing community, who resided close to the seashore especially Akkaraipattai. The property losses impacted the fishing industry, as most of the boats were damaged by the inundation. The immediate aftermath created a lull in tourism.

== Demographics ==
Religion in Nagapattinam (2011)
Religion	Percent(%)
Hindu	71.4%
Muslim	24.8%
Christian	3.7%
Others	0.1%

Historical population
Year	Pop.	±%
1901	35,890	—
1911	42,586	+18.7%
1921	49,282	+15.7%
1931	55,978	+13.6%
1941	62,674	+12.0%
1951	69,370	+10.7%
1961	74,965	+8.1%
1981	80,560	+7.5%
1991	86,155	+6.9%
2001	93,148	+8.1%
2011	102,905	+10.5%
Sources: 1901 – 2001: 2011:

According to 2011 census, Nagapattinam had a population of 102,905 with a sex-ratio of 1,026 females for every 1,000 males, much above the national average of 929. A total of 11,884 were under the age of six, constituting 6,089 males and 5,795 females. Scheduled Castes and Scheduled Tribes accounted for 8.67% and 0.62% of the population respectively. The average literacy of the town was 78.74%, compared to the national average of 72.99%. The town had 24688 households. There were 33,532 workers, comprising 209 cultivators, 320 main agricultural labourers, 605 in house hold industries, 29,875 other workers, 2,523 marginal workers, 35 marginal cultivators, 130 marginal agricultural labourers, 64 marginal workers in household industries and 2,294 other marginal workers. As per the religious census of 2011, Nagapattinam had 71.4% Hindus, 24.79% Muslims, 3.68% Christians, 0.01% Sikhs, 0.02% Buddhists, 0.01% Jains and 0.08% following other religions.

The decadal growth rate was higher during the decade ending in 1981, due to an increase in the town limits from 8.7 km^{2} (3.4 sq mi) to 14.95 km^{2} (5.77 sq mi). The overall growth rate has declined over the period due to migration of people to other urban centres. There are 40 slums in the town as of 2001, with an estimated 44% residing in these slums. Out of 40 slums, 14 were affected by the 2004 tsunami. With the help of grant schemes and tsunami assistance programmes, these were rebuilt to tsunami-proof houses.

== Economy ==
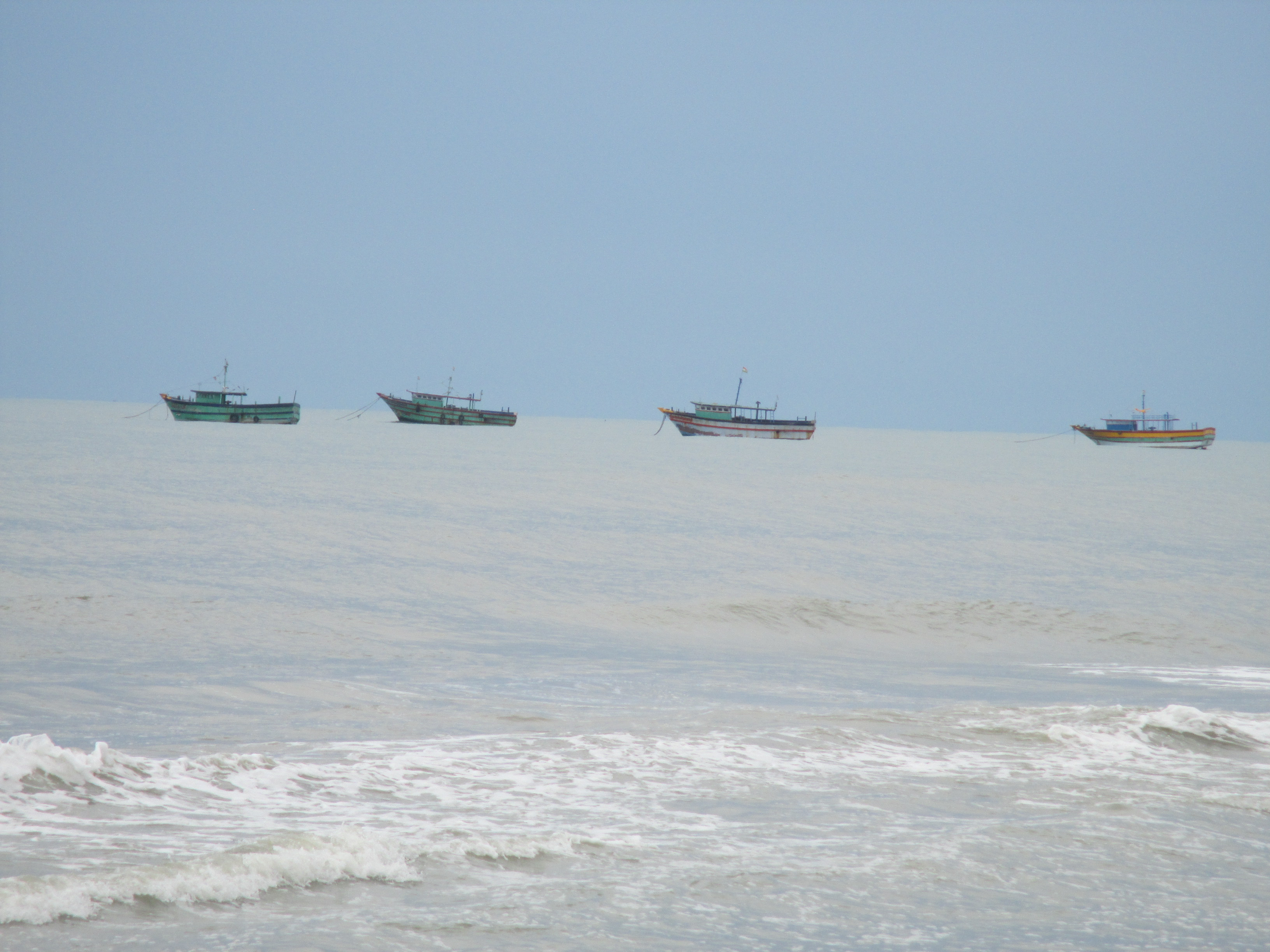
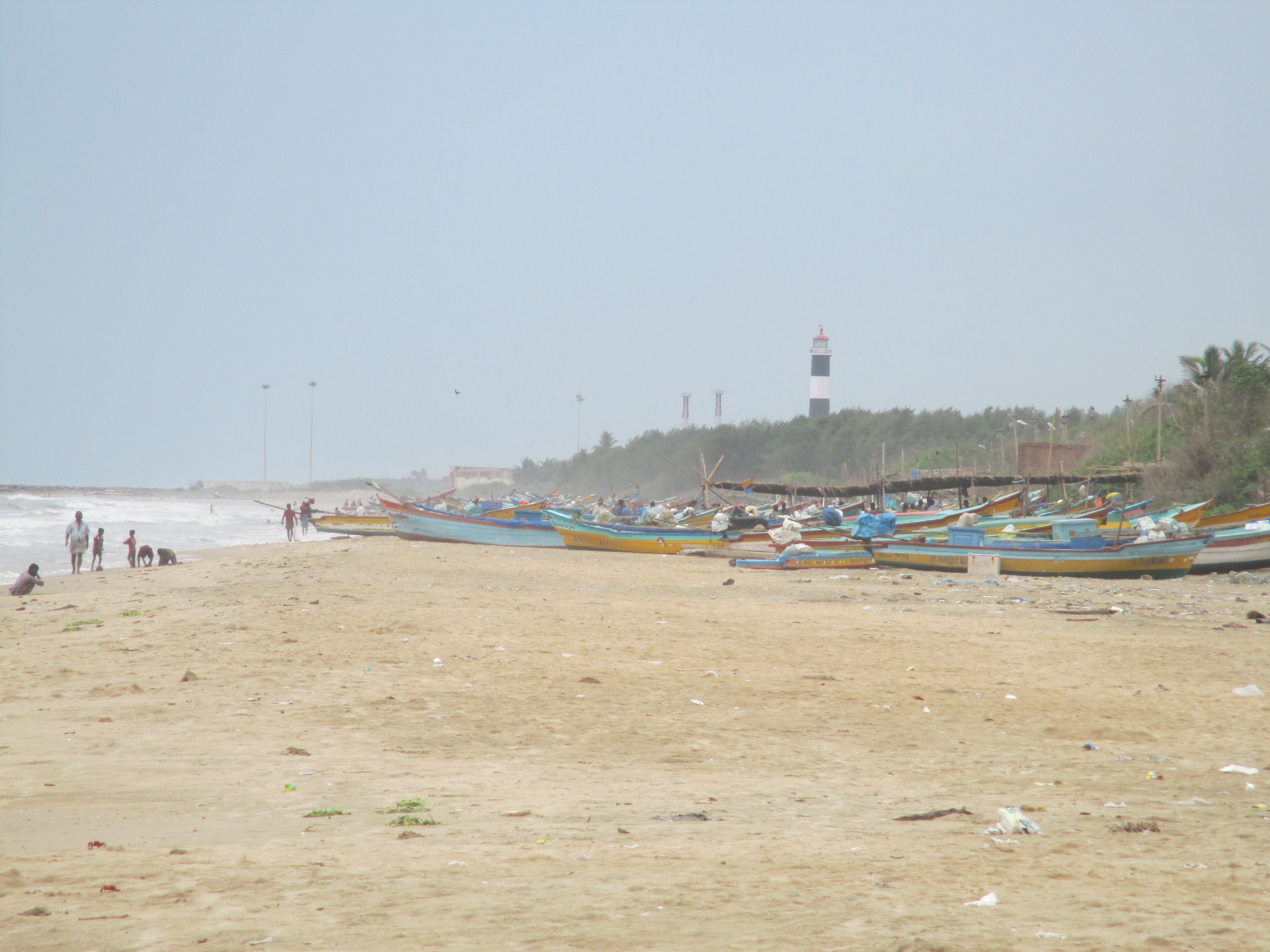
Image of fishing boat and lighthouse

The main occupation of Nagapattinam is fishing in the waters of Bay of Bengal. The fish are sold in the daily and weekly fish markets in the town. There is a large number of ice factories for preserving the fish. The industry suffered a setback after the tsunami that struck the coast on 26 December 2004.

There is limited agricultural activity, but much agricultural commerce is conducted in the town. A majority of the people are employed in service industry, belonging to the tertiary sector. The town is also the centre of retail provisions trading for the towns and villages surrounding Nagapattinam.

Tourism is a major economic driver with the presence of heritage and historic points like Nagore, Velankanni, Sikkal, Kodikkarai, Vedaranyam, Mannargudi and Tharangambadi.

There is limited industrial activity – the major industries are household, tailoring, embroidery, plastic wire and metal manufacturing. Cauvery Basin Refinery (Nagapattnam Refinery), a subsidiary of Chennai Petroleum Corporation Limited (CPCL) is near Nagapattinam. Established in 1993, it is a major contributor to the economy of the town. The development of industries is constrained by the town being linear and by the applicability of Coastal Regulation Zone (CRZ) regulations that prevent large-scale construction and industrial buildings. All major nationalised banks such as State Bank of India, Indian Bank, Central Bank of India, Punjab National Bank, Indian Overseas Bank and private banks like ICICI Bank, City Union Bank have branches in Nagapattinam. All these banks have their automated teller machines located in various parts of the town.

== Transport ==
Nagapattinam municipality accommodates 104.539 km (64.958 mi) of roads; 27.328 km (16.981 mi) of cement roads, 72.993 km (45.356 mi) of bituminous roads, 1.2 km (0.75 mi) of WBM roads and 3.018 km (1.875 mi) of earthen roads. Nagapattinam is connected by two national highways, NH 45A to Villupuram and NH 67 to Coimbatore and Gundlupete in Karnataka state. The Tamil Nadu State Transport Corporation operates close to 175 daily bus services connecting various cities to Nagapattinam. It also operates 25 town buses satisfying the local transport needs of Nagapattinam and the neighbouring villages. The State Express Transport Corporation operates long-distance buses connecting Nagapattinam to a number of other cities.

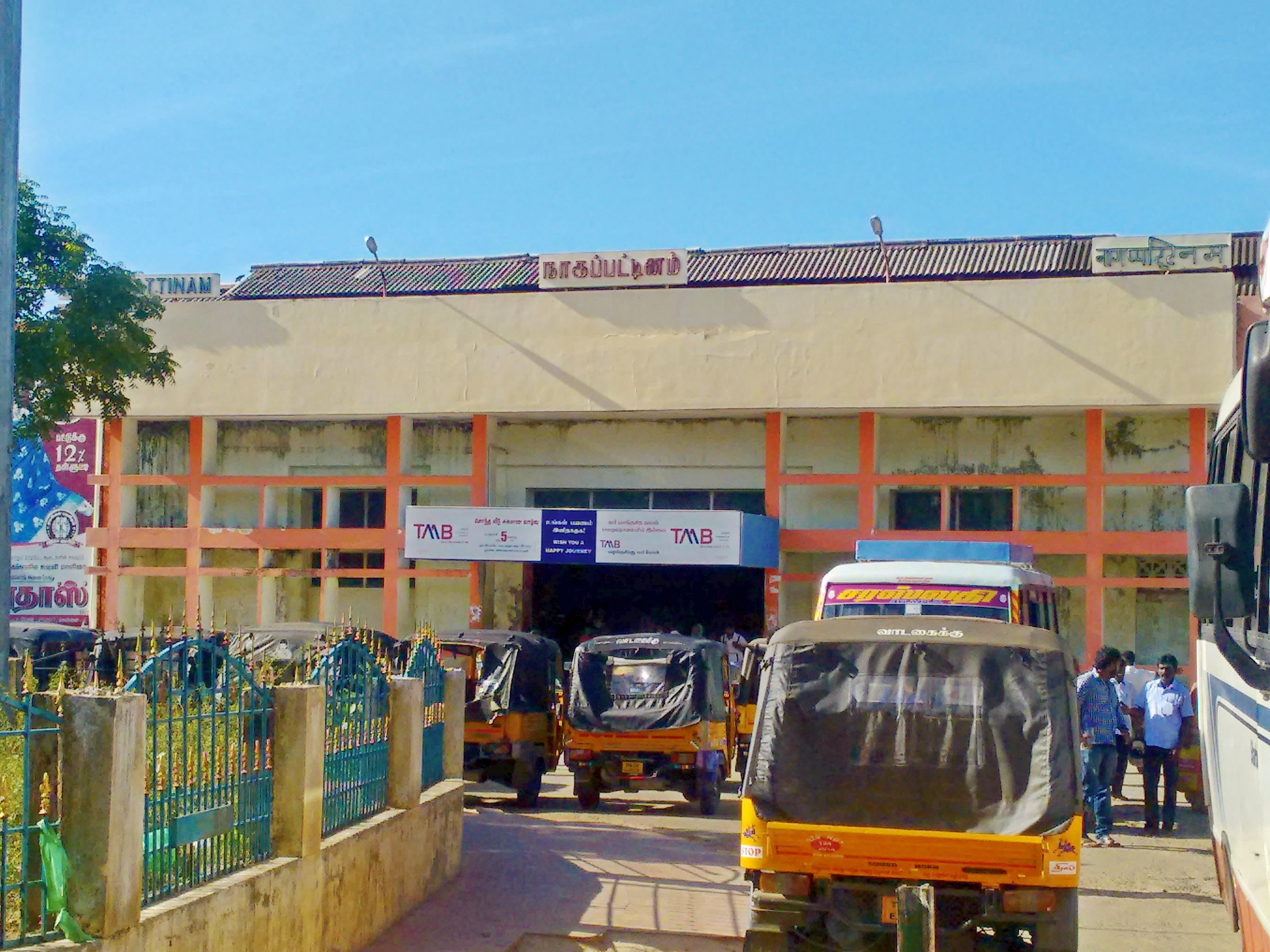
Entrance of Nagapattinam Junction railway station

Great Southern of India Railway Company (GSIR) had its headquarters at Nagapattinam between 1861 and 1875. A broad gauge railway [BG] line was operated between Nagapattinam and Tiruchirappalli Junction via Thiruvarur Junction, Thanjavur Junction between 1861 and 1875. During 1875 it was converted into a meter gauge (MG) line. The GSIR headquarters was shifted to Tiruchirapalli during 1875. The railway workshop was at Negapatnam until 1929 and contributed to the growth of the town. It was also moved to Golden rock [Ponmalai] during 1929. Nagapattinam Junction connects Thiruvarur Junction in the west, Nagore in the north and Velankanni in the south. There are passenger trains to Tiruchirappalli Junction, Thanjavur Junction, Mayiladuthurai Junction, Karaikal, Mannargudi and Thiruthuraipoondi Junction. There is a daily express train to Chennai Egmore via Mayiladuthurai Junction and Ernakulam Junction via Coimbatore Junction (Tea Garden Express). Vasco da Gama to Velankanni Express that pass via Nagapattinam Junction.

The port of Nagapattinam is in the Bay of Bengal in the mouth of river Kuduvayyar. Nagapattinam was the most important port of the Chola empire. All the eastern naval expeditions of Rajendra Chola I (1012–44 CE) were through the port. The port was widely used by the Dutch, Portuguese and British as one of the major ports of the Coramandel Coast for trading purposes. Most of the principal exports to Sri Lanka from the port during the British period were rice, piece goods, livestock, cigars, tobacco and hides. The trade of Nagapattinam was mostly with Sri Lanka, Straits Settlements, Burma and to a small extent to the United Kingdom and Spain. The port also served passenger traffic to Singapore, but this was suspended due to a fire accident. The modern day port has a commercial port complex and a dockyard that are protected by a river mouth sand bar facing the port. The port handles only a limited amount of edible oil imports. The Nagapttinam lighthouse is the first conventional 20-metre-high (66 ft) lighthouse tower, built inside the port premises by the British in 1869. The port and the lighthouse are maintained by the Tamil Nadu Maritime Board under the Government of India. Thirukkuvalai Port is a deep-water multi-modal port.

The nearest airport is Tiruchirapalli Airport, located 145 km (90 mi) away from the town.

== Culture and tourism ==
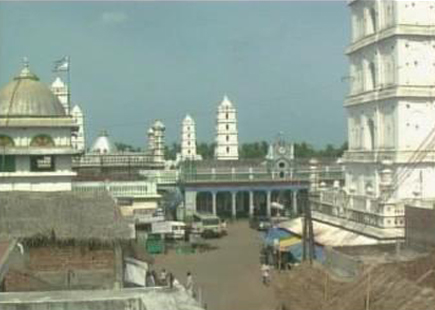
Nagore Durgah, built in the 16th century, is one of the major landmarks of the town

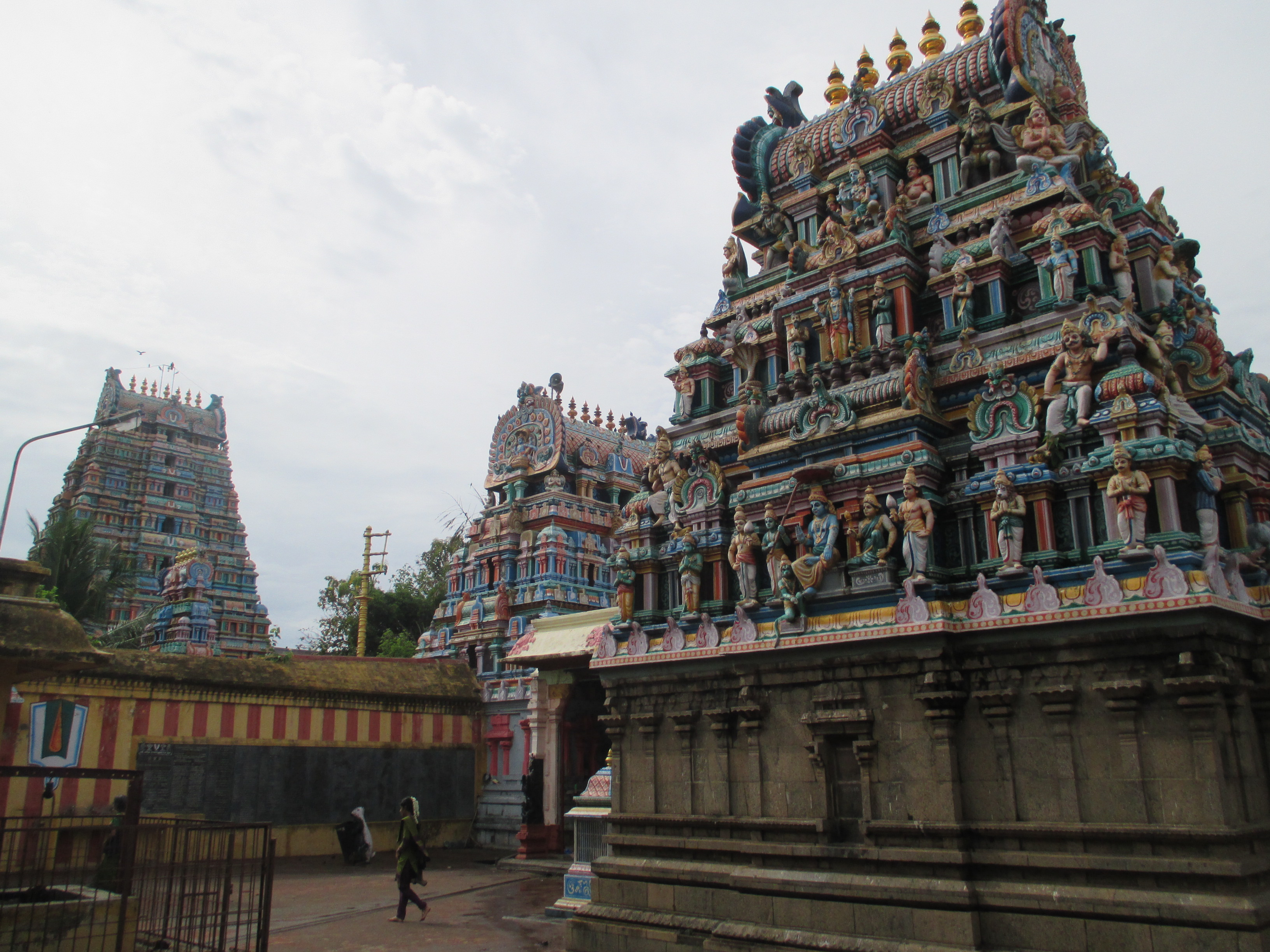
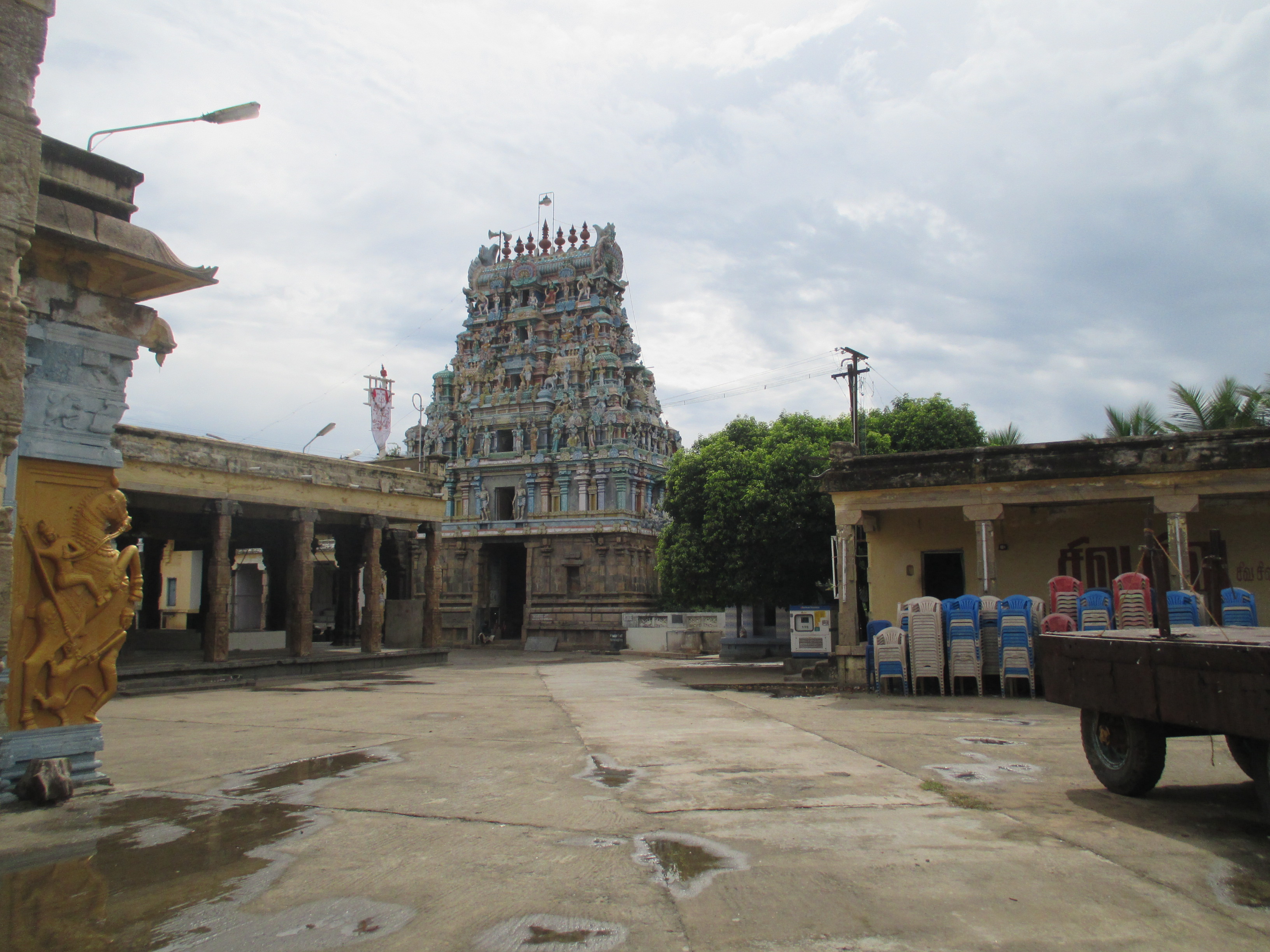
Soundararaja Perumal Temple and Kayarohanaswami Temple are the most prominent temples in the town.

Tourism plays a key economic role for the town, even though fishing is the major occupation. Nagapttinam is a base for heritage and historic points like Nagore, Velankanni, Sikkal, Kodiyakkarai, Vedaranyam, Mannargudi and Tharangambadi.

Soundararajaperumal Temple is a Hindu temple in the town dedicated to Vishnu. It is one of the Divya Desams, the 108 temples of Vishnu revered in Nalayira Divya Prabandham by Thirumangai Alvar, one of the 12 poet saints called Alvars belonging to the 6th–9th century. Nagapattinam is base to some of the prominent Hindu temples like Sikkal Singaravelan Temple at Sikkal, Vedaranyeswarar Temple at Vedaranyam, Ettukudi Murugan Temple and Koothanur Maha Saraswathi Temple.

Kayarohanaswami Temple is a Hindu temple dedicated to Shiva. The temple has been in existence from the 6th century CE and has been revered by the verses of Tevaram, the 7th–8th century Saiva canonical work by Appar, Campantar and Sundarar. The temple is one of the seven temples of the Thyagaraja cult, classified as Saptha Vidangam, where the presiding deity Thyagaraja is believed to portray different dance styles. The temple is also known for the shrine of Neelayadakshi, the consort of Kayarohanaswami.

Nagore Durgha, a 16th-century minaret located in Nagore, is one of the important pilgrimage centres of the town. Kanduri festival is a 14-day event celebrated for the annual urs (anniversary) of the saint Hajrath Shahul Hamid (1490–1579 CE), in honor of whom the minaret was built. The festival is celebrated in commemoration of the anniversary of the saint's death, and pilgrims from various religions participate in the rituals and rites. The festival is also seen as a sacred exchange between Hindus and Muslims expressing solidarity of mixed faith in the region. It is believed that 60 percent of the shrines were built by Hindus and historically the minaret garners many domestic and international visitors. There are three other prominent mosques; one near Nagai Pudhur Road, one near the new bus stand, and another at Moolakadai Street.

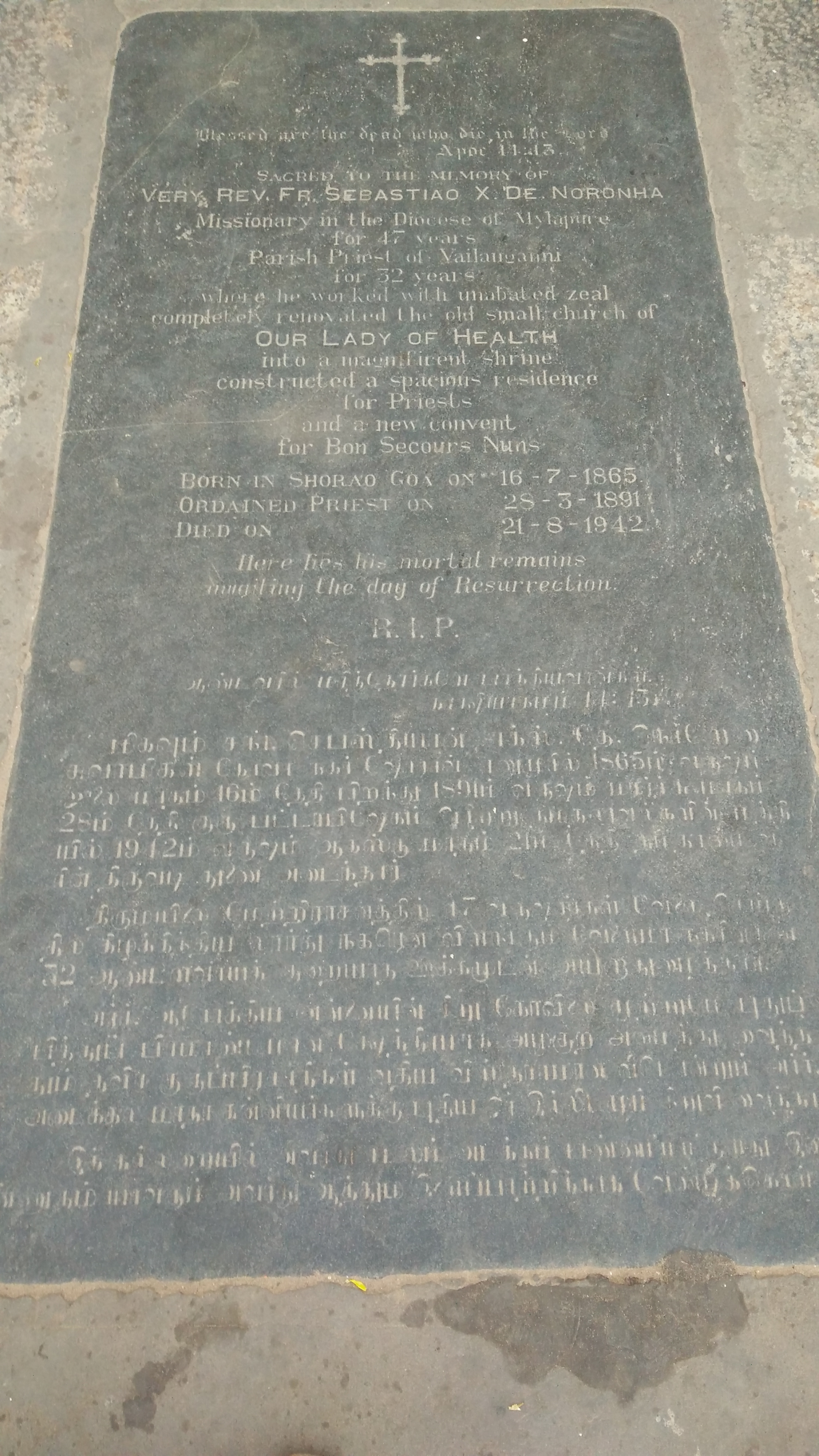
A tombstone of Sebastiao X De Noronha, who served as a priest in the Basilica of Our Lady of Good Health, Velankanni

Velankanni is a pilgrimage centre located 10 km (6.2 mi) from Nagapattinam. The town is known for the Basilica of Our Lady of Good Health, a Roman Catholic church built during the 17th century. Pilgrimage to the basilica is common during September when people of many faiths, especially Hindus, Muslims and Christians of all denominations visit the basilica. The town has four prominent churches; the Lourdhu Madha (Sindhathurai Madha) Church, the Madharasi Madha Church, T.E.L.C. Church and the Protestant Church.

== Education and utility services ==
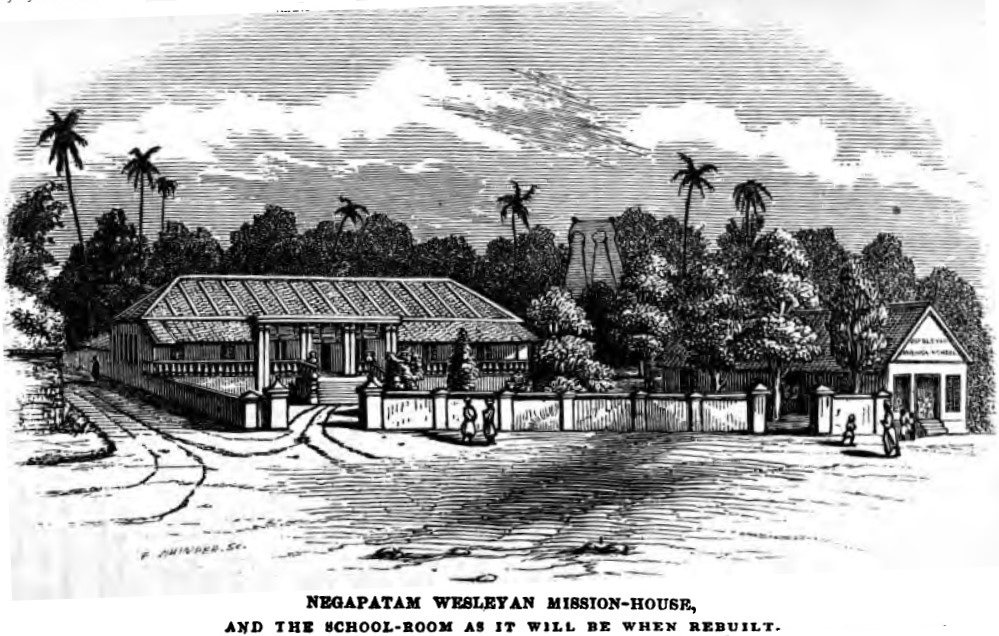
Negapatam Wesleyan Mission-House and the school-room as it will be when rebuilt (October 1855, p. 108, Rev. Thomas Hodson)

St. Joseph's College, opened in Nagapattinam in 1846 and transferred to Tiruchirappalli in 1883, is one of the oldest higher educational institutions in India. In 2012 Tamil Nadu Government started a separate fisheries university Tamil Nadu Dr. J. Jayalalithaa Fisheries University, Nagapattinam. Nagapattinam has 12 elementary schools, 8 high schools and 7 higher secondary schools. There are 1 Medical College, 3 arts and science colleges, 2 engineering college, 3 polytechnic colleges and one industrial training institute (ITI) in the town.

The electricity supplied to the town is regulated and distributed by the Nagapattinam circle of Tamil Nadu Electricity Board (TNEB). The water supply is provided by the Nagapattinam Municipality, through borewells from Vettar river – the distribution is done through pumping stations located at Kurukathi, Andipalayam and Solomon Park. About 55 metric tonnes of solid waste are collected from the town every day. Nagapattinam municipality does not have an underground drainage system and the current sewerage system for disposal of sullage is through septic tanks and public conveniences. The storm water drainage system is made up of the natural river drainage and man-made storm water drains.

Nagapattinam comes under the Nagapattinam telecom circle of the Bharat Sanchar Nigam Limited (BSNL), India's state-owned telecom and internet services provider. Apart from telecom, BSNL provides broadband internet service. There are six government hospitals in the town, with the largest being the District Government Hospital. There are 28 other private hospitals, clinics, and medical shops.

== Politics ==
Nagapattinam was declared a municipality in 1866 during British times. It was promoted to a second grade municipality in 1986, selection grade in 1998. From 1991, the municipal limits were expanded to include Nagore. The municipality has 36 wards and there is an elected councillor for each of those wards. The functions of the municipality are devolved into six departments: General administration/personnel, Engineering, Revenue, Public Health, Town planning and IT. All these departments are under the control of a Municipal Commissioner who is the supreme executive head. The legislative powers are vested in a body of 36 members, one from each of the 36 wards. The legislative body is headed by an elected chairperson R.Marimuthu, assisted by a deputy chairperson. The town became the district headquarters when the Nagapattinam district was created as a separate district.

Nagapattinam comes under the Nagapattinam assembly constituency and it elects a member to the Tamil Nadu Legislative Assembly every five years. From the 1977 elections, the assembly seat was won by Dravida Munnetra Kazhagam (DMK) once during the 1996 elections, All India Anna Dravida Munnetra Kazhagam (AIADMK) twice during the 1991 and 2001 elections, and Communist Party of India (Marxist) five times during the 1977, 1980, 1984, 1989 and 2006 elections. The current MLA of the constituency is K. A. Jayapal, the minister for fisheries in the Government of Tamil Nadu.

Nagapattinam is a part of the Nagapattinam (Lok Sabha constituency) — it has the following six assembly constituencies — Thiruvar, Nagapattinam, Thiruthuraipoondi, Vedaranyam, Kilvelur (SC) and Nannilam. The current Member of Parliament from the constituency is Dr. K. Gopal from the AIADMK party. From 1957, the Nagapattinam parliament seat was held by the Indian National Congress for five times during 1957–1961, 1962–67, 1967–71, 1991–96, and 1996–98 elections. CPI won the seat for five times during 1971–77, 1977–80, 1989–91, 1996–98 and 1998 elections. DMK won four times during 1980–84, 1999–2004, 2004–09 and 2009 elections. AIADMK won the seat twice during the 1984–89 elections and 2014 elections.

Law and order in the town in maintained by the Nagapattinam sub division of the Tamil Nadu Police headed by a Deputy Superintendent (DSP). There are three police stations in the town, one of them being an all-women police station. There are special units like prohibition enforcement, district crime, social justice and human rights, district crime records and special branch that operate at the district level police division headed by a Superintendent of Police (SP).
