= Sikkal =

- village
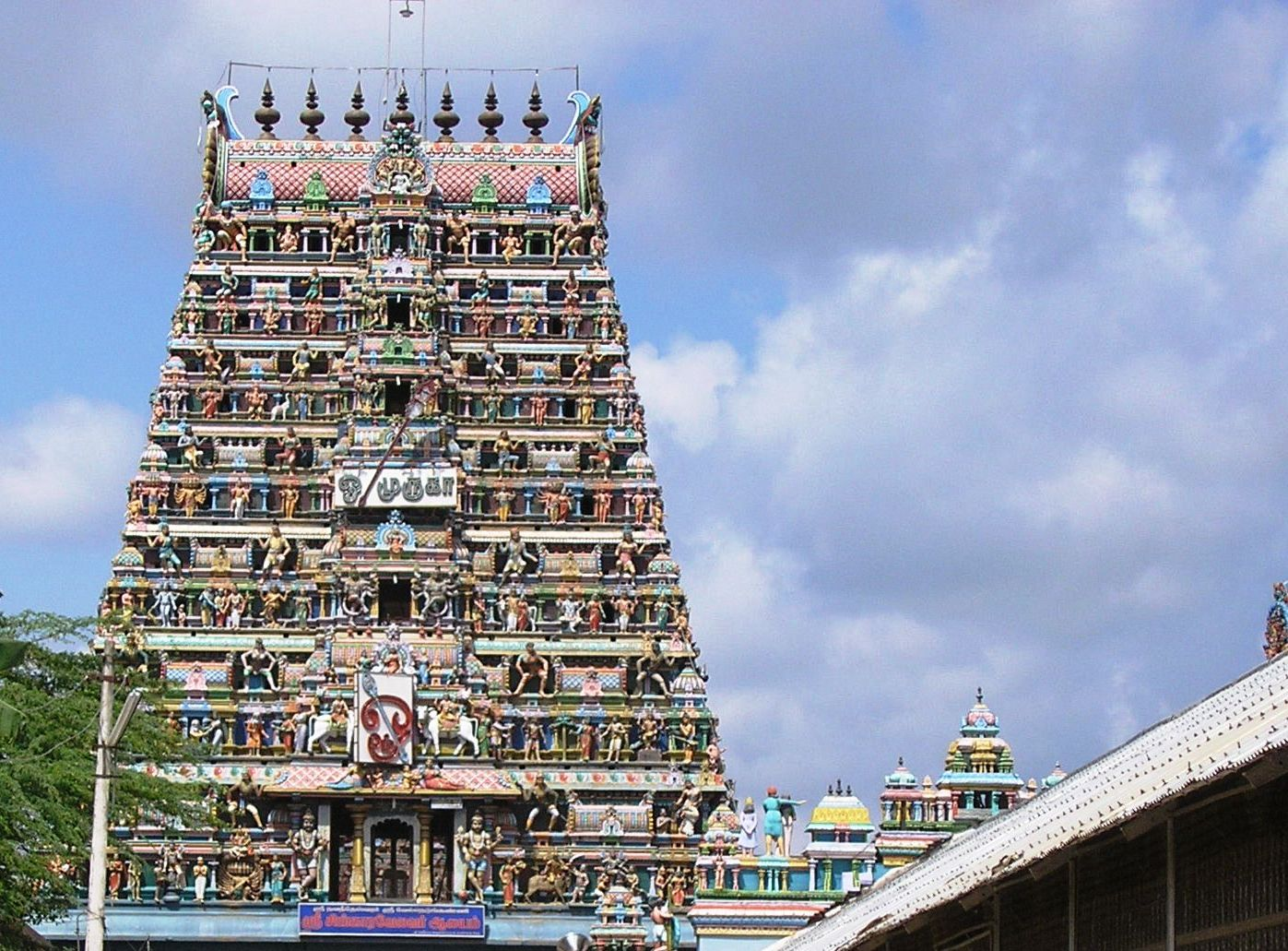
- Sikkal Singaravelan temple tower

- Location in Tamil Nadu, India Sikkal (India)
- Coordinates: 10.756°N 79.799°E
- Country: India
- State: Tamil Nadu
- District: nagapattinam

Languages
  - Official: Tamil
- Time zone: UTC+5:30 (IST)

Sikkal is a small township located between Thiruvarur and Nagapattinam in Tamil Nadu, India. It is 6 km west of Nagapattinam, 18 km east of Thiruvarur. It is Famous for the Pancha Narayana Kshethrams namely Loganatha Perumal Temple, Sri Anantha Narayana Swamy Perumal Temple, Sri Devanarayana perumall temple, sri Varada Narayana perumal temple and Yadava perumal temple. It is also famous for its Murugan temple, and one of the most popular festivals is the Sura Samhaaram.

Singaravelan Temple

Navaneetheswarar Temple
