= Soundararajaperumal Temple, Nagapattinam =

Hindu temple in Nagapattinam, Tamil Nadu

Soundararajaperumal Temple
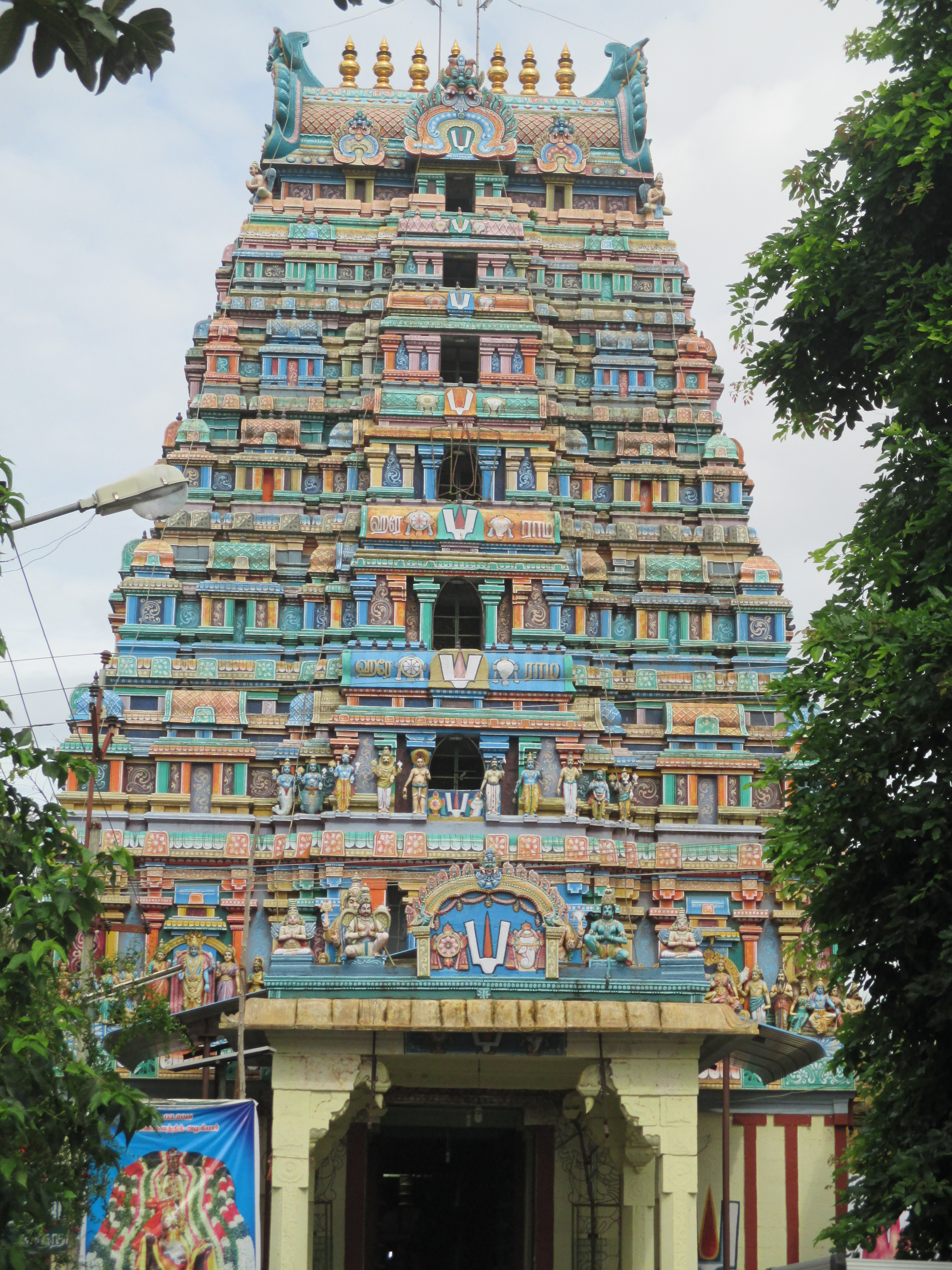

- Location in Tamil Nadu

Religion
- Affiliation: Hinduism
- District: Nagapattinam
- Deity: Soundararajaperumal (Vishnu); Soundaravalli (Lakshmi)

Location
- Location: Nagapattinam
- State: Tamil Nadu
- Country: India
- Coordinates: 10°45′38″N 79°50′24″E

Architecture
- Type: Dravidian architecture

The Soundararajaperumal Temple is a temple dedicated to the Hindu god, Vishnu. It is located in Nagapattinam, a town in the South Indian state of Tamil Nadu. Constructed in Dravidian style of architecture, the temple is glorified in the Nalayira Divya Prabandham, the early medieval Tamil canon of the Alvar saints from the 6th–9th centuries CE. It is counted as one among the 108 Divya Desams dedicated to Vishnu. Vishnu is worshiped as Soundararaja Perumal and his consort Lakshmi as Soundaravalli.

The temple is believed to have been built by the Medieval Cholas of the late 8th century CE, with later contributions at different times from Thanjavur Nayaks. The temple has two inscriptions dating from the Chola period. The temple has a five-tiered rajagopuram (gateway tower) within a granite wall. The complex contains all the shrines and water bodies associated with it.

Soundararaja Perumal is believed to have appeared for Sage Markandeya, Dhruva, Saleesan, and the goddess Bhudevi. The temple observes six daily rituals and three yearly festivals. The chariot festival, celebrated during the Tamil month of Chittirai (March–April), is the most prominent festival of the temple. The temple is maintained and administered by the Hindu Religious and Endowment Board of the Government of Tamil Nadu.

== Legend ==
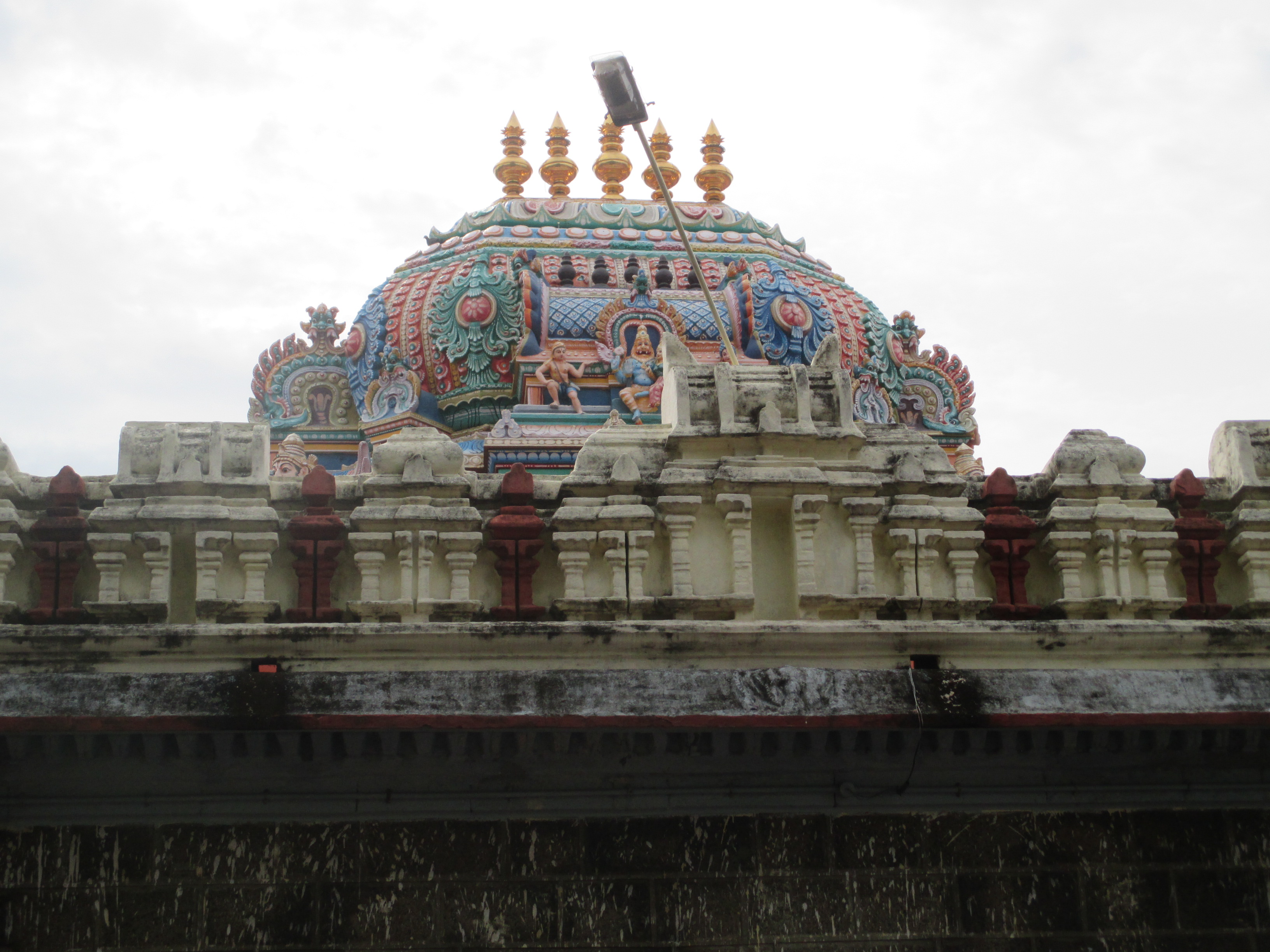
Vimana of the temple

A distributary of the river Kaveri, Odambokki, passes close to the temple and the river is also called Virutha Kaveri. This leads to one of the names of presiding deity, "Kaveri Thuraivan". The present day Nagapattinam is believed to have been a forest, historically named Sundararinyam. During Treta Yuga a prince, Dhruva, heard about the importance of the forest and began a penance, wishing to see Vishnu. Pleased by this penance, Vishnu appeared to him. Following his example, Markendaya Maharishi did penance and attained the vision of Vishnu during Satya Yuga and Lakshmi, the consort of Vishnu, during Treta Yuga as did king Saleesa Chola during Kali Yuga. It is believed that two eunuchs, Kandan and Sukandan, attained physical fitness after having a holy dip in Sara Pushkarani, the temple tank. The Hindu god of creation, Brahma, started worshiping Vishnu at this place. Vishnu is believed to have appeared on the auspicious day of Masi Maham on the banks of Sarapushkarani. On account of the glow emanating from Masi Maham, Vishnu at this place was called "Aḻagiyan". Since he had a glittering skin, he was called "Soundara Rajan", meaning the most beautiful and his consort was called Soundaravalli. Since the king of Nagas (snakes), Adisesha worshipped Vishnu at this place, the place was called Nagar Pattinam, the place of Nagas.

== History ==
The temple had contributions from Pallavas, Nagars, and Cholas during the 8th to 10th centuries. During the later centuries, Thanjavur Nayaks and subsequently the Thanjavur Marathas are believed to have made significant contributions to the temple. During the rule of the Nayaks, Nagapattinam was a busy port and it was more of a Dutch territory. On the request of the Dutch for a light house, the Nayak king is believed to have built the seven tiered temple tower and utilized it as the light house. Jagul Nayakar, the lieutenant of a Nayak king during the 1650s, was a staunch worshiper of Soundararaja Perumal. He is believed to have built the temple tower, halls and the compound wall around the temple. The image of him and his wife Lakshmi Ammal are installed in one of the halls built by them. Kundo Pandithar, an officer of the Nayak kingdom during 1737, is believed to have constructed the Ashtana mandapam, and the Pachai Varnar, Pavala Vannar, Veetriruntha Perumal, Kidantha Kola Perumal and Vishvaksenar shrines. During the early 20th century, Dratcha Balagurumuthi Chettiyar built the Bhakthiula hall, Chinnaya Chettiyar rebuilt the Vasantha hall, Nachiyappa Pillai rebuilt the Mataipalli, Ramasami Pillai renovated the image of the presiding shrine and the citizens of the town contributed to various other renovations. There are inscriptions from various ruling empires on the contributions made to the maintenance of the temple.

== Architecture ==
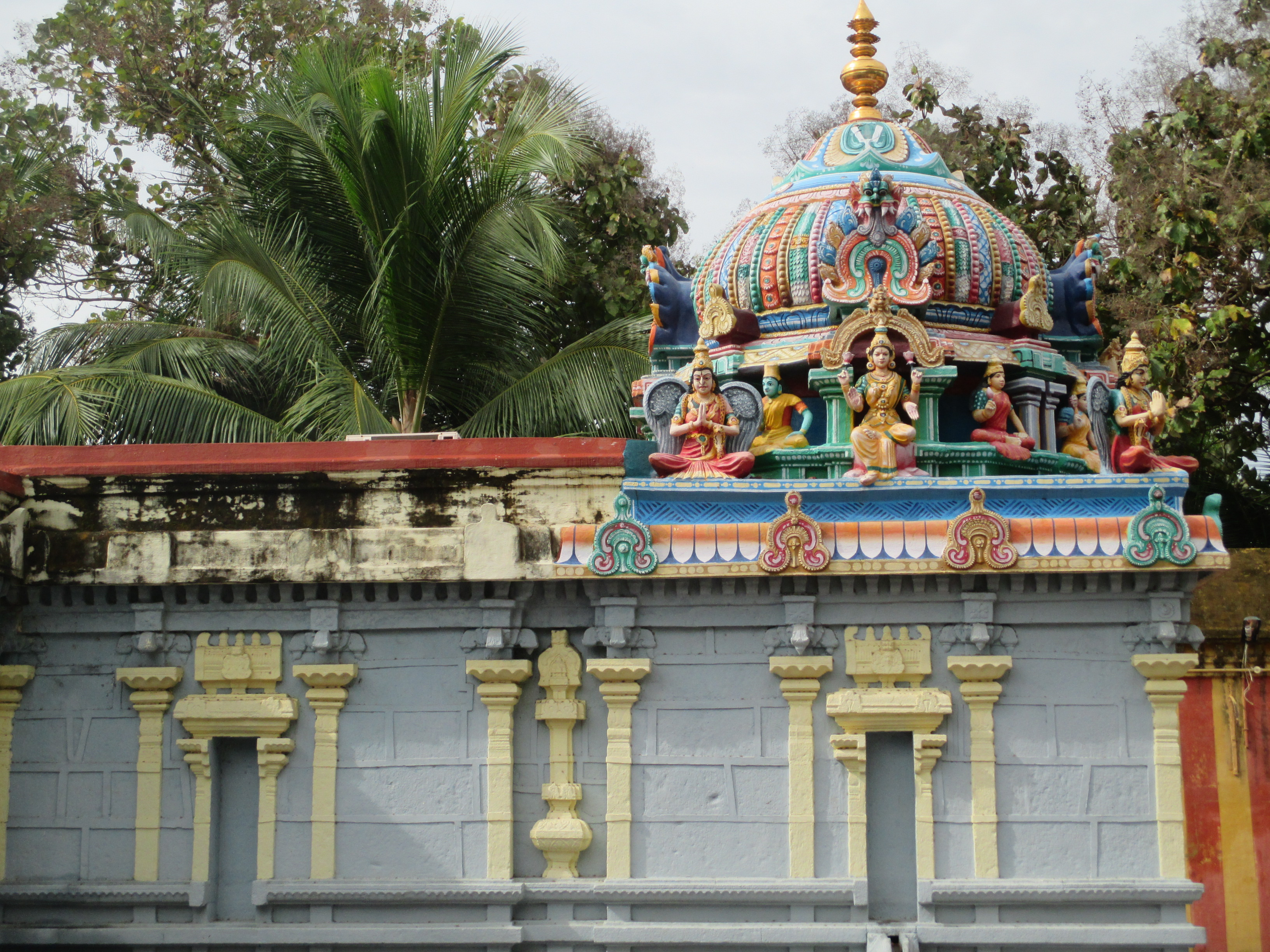
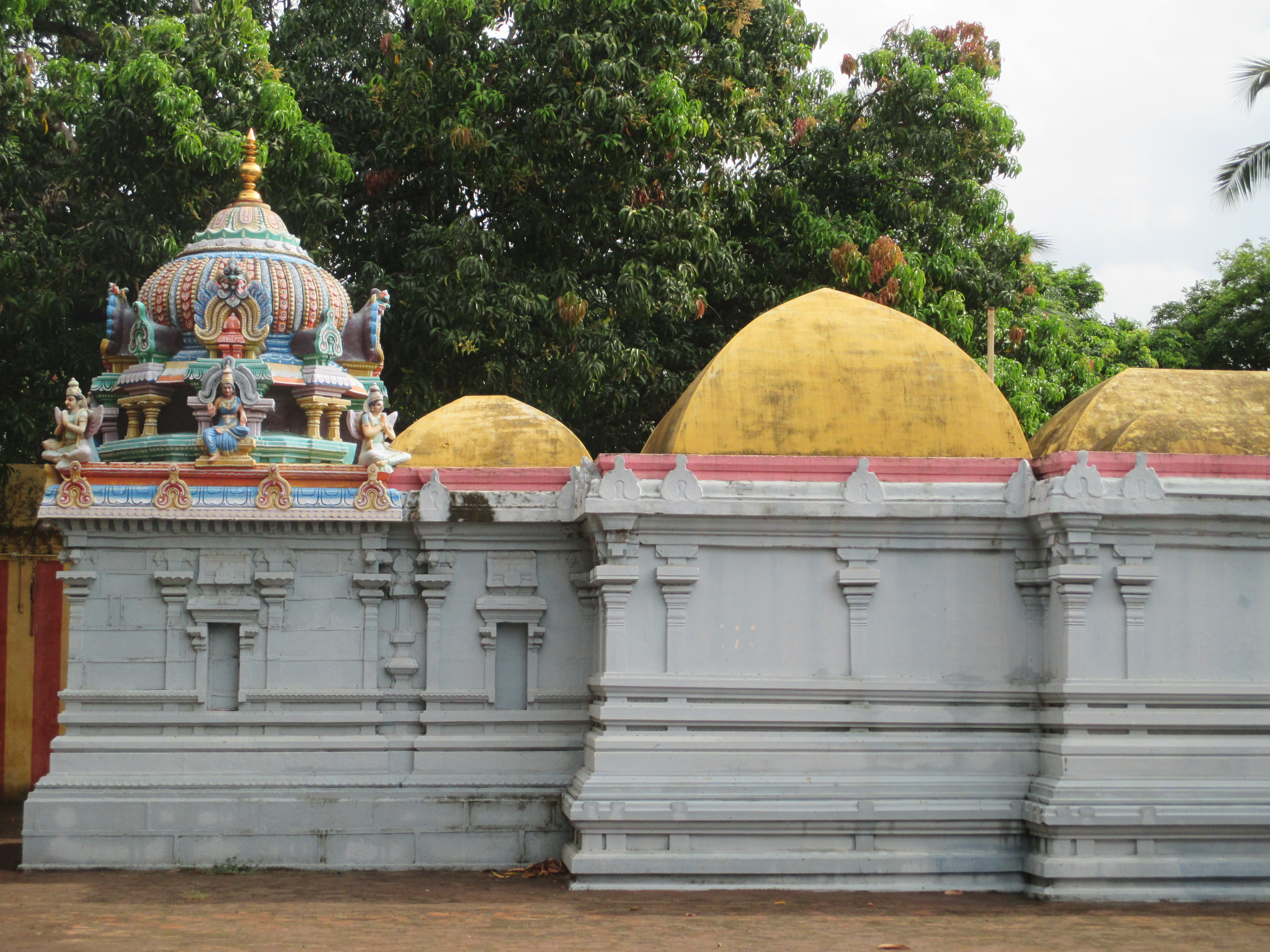
Shrines inside the temple walls

The temple is located in Nagapattinam, a town in the South Indian state of Tamil Nadu. The main entrance of the temple faces the East and, at the entrance of the temple, there is a four pillared open hall. The temple has a 90 ft (27 m) tall rajagopuram (temple tower) and is enclosed by rectangular walls around it. There is a smaller temple tower on the western side. The walls of the temple are surrounded by large streets, through which the temple chariot passes during festivals. The Southern street accommodates the station of the temple chariot and Sarapushkarani, the temple tank. A rare image of Narasimha with eight hands, one blessing Prahlada, another showing the abhaya mudra and the others involved in the killing of the asura, Hiranyakashipu, is present in the temple. There is a four-pillared hall in front of the shrine of Soundarvalli shrine that has beautiful architectural treatment. The hall has the images of the architects who designed it. The Nayaka hall is built like a chariot with wheels outside it. The hall which has entrance to the temple has two eight foot sculptures of the guardian deities Sumba and Nigumba.

== Religious importance ==
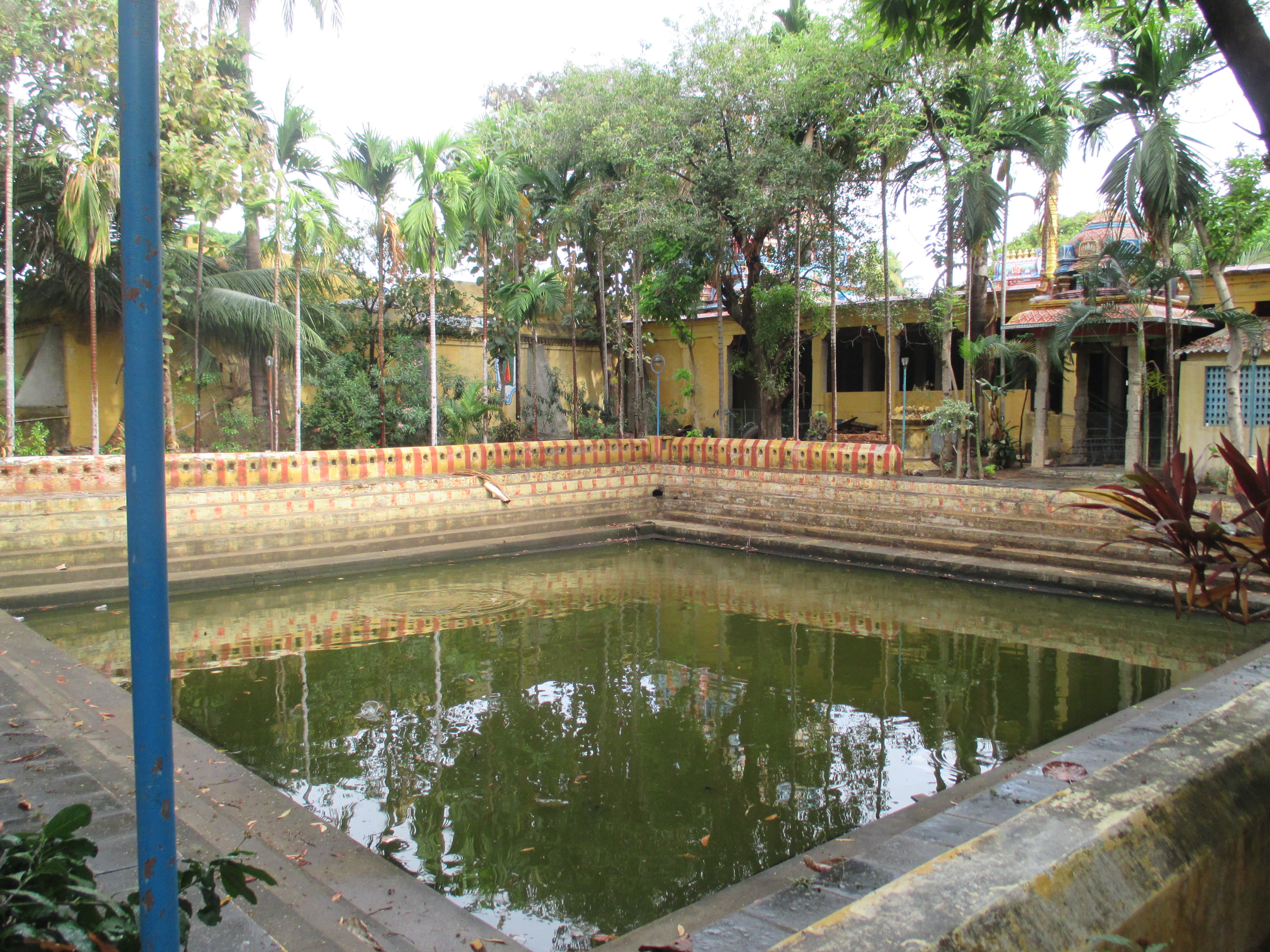
Temple tank

The temple finds mention in Brahmanda Purana in the Utharkanda Gyana Yoga section. The temple is revered in Nalayira Divya Prabandham, the 7th–9th century Vaishnava canon, by Thirumangai alvar. It is considered one of the important temples visited by Thirumangai Alvar. The Alvar has sung praise, imagining himself as a lady and Soundaraja as his lover. The temple is classified as a Divya Desam, one of the 108 Vishnu temples that are mentioned in the book. Many acharyas have also written songs on the various forms of Soundaraja in this Temple. Thivyakavi Pillai Peruman has revered the presiding deity in his works of Notriyettu Tirupathi Kovai and Paravai Ramanujar in his works of Notriyettu Tirupathi Tirupugaḻ. Muthukrishna Dasar, a poet of the early 20th century, has glorified Soundararaja Perumal and Soundaravalli in his works in Pancharatna Pathigam. Soundararaja Perumal Thasavathara Pathigam is a work on the presiding deity by Subbarayapillai. One of the three Sangeetha Mumurthi, namely Muthuswami Dikshitar, has sung praise of the deity in his verses.

== Sources ==
- Tourist Guide to Tamil Nadu. Sura Books. 2010. p. 72. ISBN 978-81-7478-177-2.
- R., Adikesavapillai (2000). Thirunagai Sri Soundararaja Perumal Thirukoyil Varalaru. Nagapattinam: Sri Soundararaja Perumal Kaingarya Sabha.
- R., Dr. Vijayalakshmy (2001). An introduction to religion and philosophy - Tévarám and Tivviyappirapantam (1st ed.). Chennai: International Institute of Tamil Studies.
