= Sikkal Singaravelan Temple =

Temple in Tamil Nadu, India

Sikkal Singaravelar Temple
- சிக்கல் சிங்காரவேலர் கோயில்
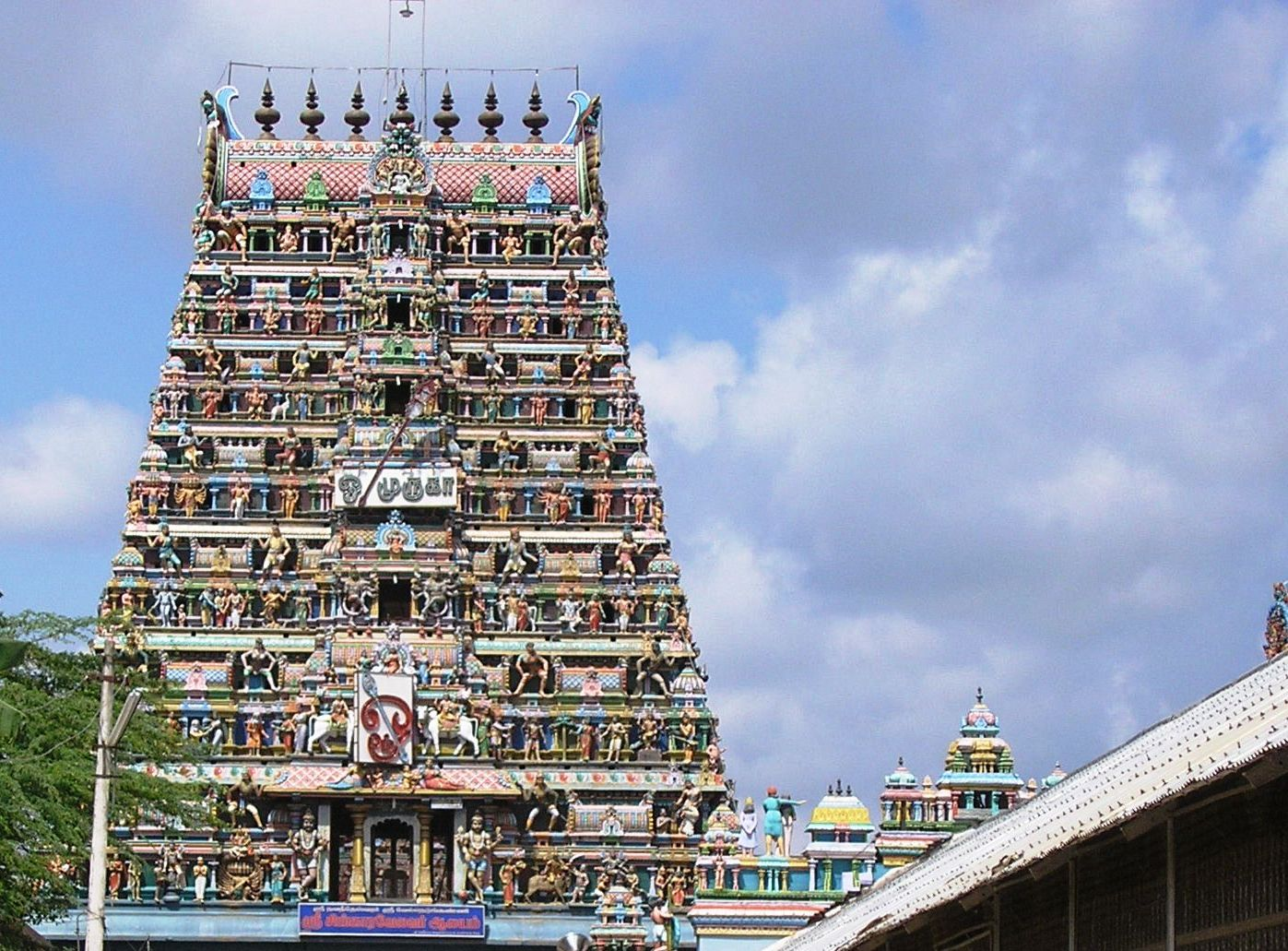

Religion
- Affiliation: Hinduism
- District: Nagapattinam
- Deity: Singaravelar (Lord Murugan)

Location
- Location: Sikkal
- State: Tamil Nadu
- Country: India
- Interactive map of Sikkal Singaravelar Temple
- Coordinates: 10.7567°N 79.7987°E

Architecture
- Type: Dravidian Architecture
- Creator: unknown
- Temples: 2 (one for Shiva & Kartikeya and the other for Vishnu)

Sikkal Singara Velar Temple is one of the most popular Hindu temples dedicated to Lord Muruga and a contender for the not unofficial seventh Padaiveedu of Muruga, along with the popular Arupadaiveedu (six abodes of Lord Muruga).

It is one of the rare traditional Hindu temples that has both Shiva and Vishnu deities in the same complex.

== Location ==
The temple is located in the village of Sikkal, near Nagapattinam in Tamil Nadu, India. It is 5 kilometers in the West from Nagapattinam and 18 kilometers in the East from Thiruvarur on the way to Nagapatptinam.

== Sikkal Navaneetheswarar Temple ==
Sikkal Navaneetheswarar Temple is the main temple. The Singaravelan temple is found in the premises of Sikkal Navaneetheswarar Temple.

== Temple Lore ==
It is believed in Hindu mythology that this place was once a jasmine forest and due to its pleasant smell, the semi-human goddess with cow's trunk, Kamadenu lives here. Once upon a time, Kamadenu was cursed by lord Shiva, when it ate meat. Later feeling guilty of its action, it got rid of its sin by taking bath in the holy water point of this temple and worshiped here, as told by Lord Shiva. After getting rid of the sin, Kamadenu offered its milk which later became Parkulam (literal meaning the milk pond), which is located behind the temple. It is this holy water point (The Parkulam) of the temple where Vashistha Maharishi performed a pooja here, by making a lingam with the butter from the Parkulam. After completing the pooja he tried to move that lingam, but it stuck to that place, and never moved. As a result, Vasista Maharishi regarded this place as sikkal.

It is also said that Lord Murugan had got his Vel (weapon) from his divine mother at Sikkal, to kill the asura, Soorapadman in Sri Lanka. He performed Soora Samharam (literal meaning: killing Soorapadman) by setting up the base camp in Thiruchendur.

== Festivals ==
The most important festival is Soora Samharam associated with Lord Muruga getting the weapon Vel from his divine mother, Parvathi to destroy the demon king, Soorapadman. During this time, it is believed by the devotees that the idol sweats and a major event is conducted.

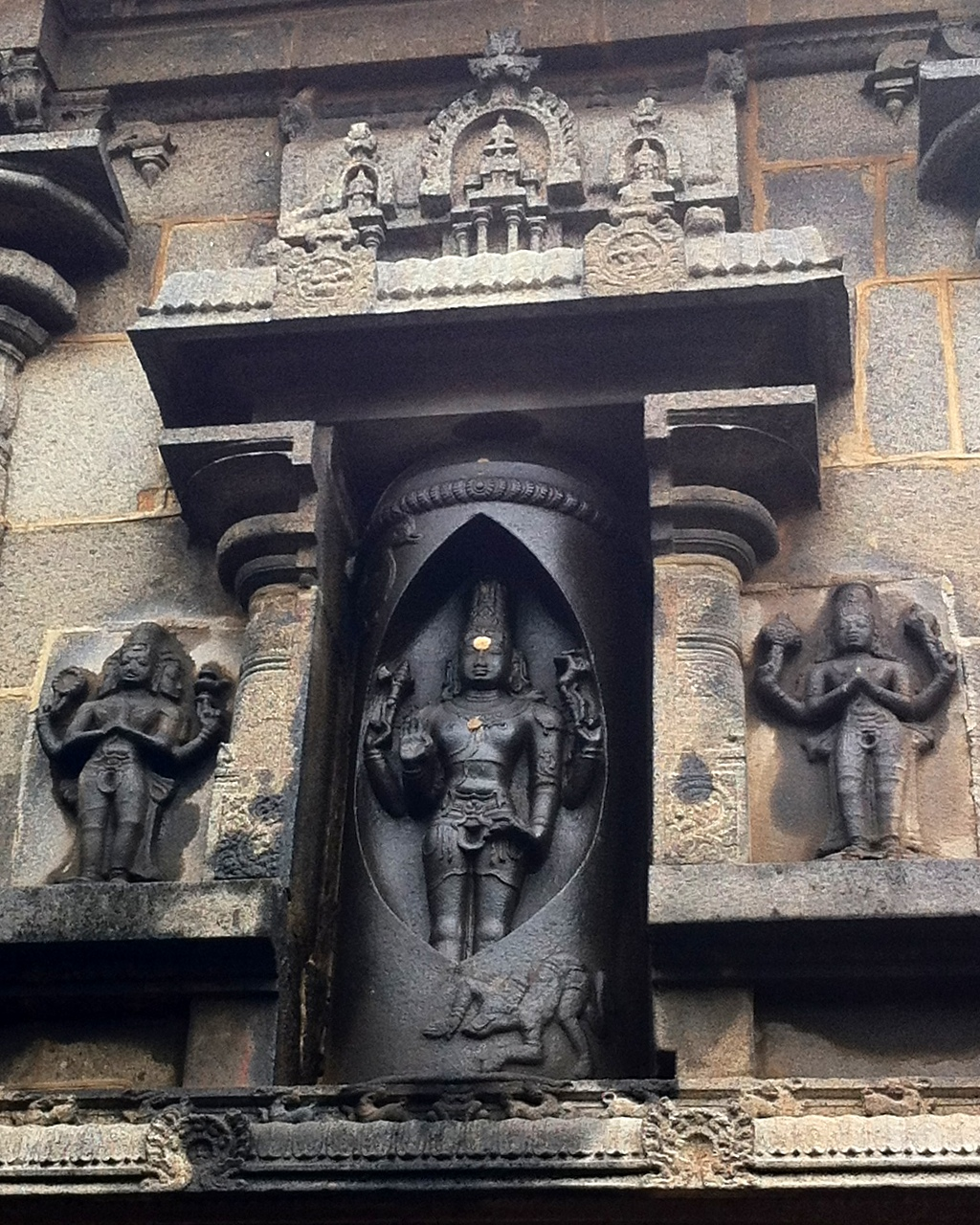
A sculpture depicting a deity inside the forehead-eye (third eye) of the Lingam at Sikkal temple
