= Akkaraipettai =

- village
- Location in Tamil Nadu, India
- Coordinates: 10.7429°N 79.8490°E
- Country: India
- State: Tamil Nadu
- District: Nagapattinam

Government
  - Type: Gram panchayat

Population (2011)
  - Total: 6,672

Languages
  - Official: Tamil
- Time zone: UTC+5:30 (IST)
- Postal code: 611106
- Vehicle registration: TN-51

Akkaraipettai is a fishing village located in Kelvelur taluk Nagapattinam district in the state of Tamil Nadu, India. The population was 6,672 at the 2011 Census. A majority of the people of Akkaraipettai are employed in sea-borne trading, fishing, agriculture, tourism and merchant navy.

Akkaraipettai is a village panchayat with three hamlets Thideer Kuppam, Keechankuppam and Kallar with a population of more than 10,000 residents who are dependent on fishing. Since the village panchayat is located in close proximity to the sea, there was high incidence of fatalities during the tsunami on 26 December 2004.

== Etymology ==
Akkaraipettai is one of the fishing villages in the Nagapattinam district. This village is totally surrounded by the water, so called Akkaraipettai. Akkaraipettai is combination of two words "Akkarai"+"Pettai", Akkarai means other side of river and Pettai means village.

== Schools ==
The village has two primary schools (up to 5th standard) and 1 higher secondary school (up to 12th standard).

1. Government Higher Secondary School Akkaraipettai
2. Jeevarathinam Nursery and Primary School
3. Sindhani Sirpi Nursery and Primary School
