= Sikkal Navaneetheswarar Temple =

Religion
- Affiliation: Hinduism
- District: Nagapattinam district
- Deity: Lord Shiva

Location
- Location: Sikkal
- State: Tamil Nadu
- Country: India
- Interactive map of Sikkal Navaneetheswarar Temple

Sikkal Navaneetheswarar Temple is a Hindu temple located at Sikkal in Nagapattinam district, Tamil Nadu, India. The temple is dedicated to Shiva, as the moolavar presiding deity, in his manifestation as Navaneetheswarar and Vennailingeswarar (Thiruvennainathar). His consort, Parvati, is known as Velvizhinadunkanni.

== Significance ==
It is one of the shrines of the 275 Paadal Petra Sthalams - Shiva Sthalams glorified in the early medieval Tevaram poems by Tamil Saivite Nayanar Tirugnanasambandar.

== Sikkal Singaravelan Temple ==
Sikkal Singaravelan Temple is found in the premises of this Siva temple.
