= Thirukkuvalai Port =

Future deep-water port in Tamil Nadu, India

The Thirukkuvalai Port is a deep-water multi-modal port projected to be developed as a part of an integrated port and power project in the Nagapattinam District of the state of Tamil Nadu in Southeastern India. It was developed initially by Tridem Port & Power Company Pvt. Ltd. The entire project will entail an investment of about INR 100 billion with 45 billion in Phase I which includes 15 billion for the port development. The Port is designed to handle 40 Mtpa.

This project was initiated during the tenure of the DMK party in the state of Tamil Nadu. The name of the project in its geographical location is misleading, named after the non-littoral locality of Thirukkuvalai (in the taluka of the same name), which is the birthplace of M. Karunanidhi, the major leader of the DMK party. Whereas the port project is planned in the locality of Vettaikkaraniruppu, located in the Kilvelur taluka, between Velankanni and Vedaranyam. This locality is also closer to Velankanni and is easier to access from the latter as well as from the town of Vedaranyam.

The project is currently frozen. Union Government infrastructure planning and investment are rather focused on the already existing ports of nearby Nagapattinam, as well as Tuticorin and Madras in a broader regional context. The privately owned port of Karaikal, in the Union Territory of Puducherry but located in the Tanjore region or Cauvery Delta, is also geographically close by.

== Development ==
The development will involve construction of breakwaters, construction of wharves / berths, and dredging the berthing areas, harbour basin, turning circle and the approach channel.

- Port limits up to 15 km (9 mi) from the shoreline.
- Approximately 278-acre (1.13 km^{2}) waterfront area with some 3.2 km (2 mi) coastline.
- Reclaimed area from dredged materials extending outwards from the 3.
- 2 km (1 mi) coastline. Size of area is to be determined by Consultant.
- A contiguous 2,000-acre (8.1 km^{2}) Free Trade Zone area with a suitable area so me 3 km (2 mi) away for storage of thermal coal directly from the berths and evacuated subsequently to the power plant and to other port users by rail or road.
